= 1997 World Rally Championship =

25th season of the FIA World Rally Championship

Champions
- World Drivers' Champion: Tommi Mäkinen
- World Manufacturers' Champion: Subaru

Seasons
- ← 1996 1998 →

The 1997 World Rally Championship was the 25th season of the FIA World Rally Championship. Registered manufacturers were required to contest the expanded 14 event calendar for the first time.

The Drivers' championship was very tightly contested and in the end Tommi Mäkinen won his second drivers' world championship in a Mitsubishi Lancer Evo IV by a single point ahead of Subaru Impreza WRC driver Colin McRae after the final round in Great Britain. Carlos Sainz was third in the leading Ford Escort WRC. The Manufacturers' title was won by Subaru, with Ford second and Mitsubishi third.

== Technical changes ==
For the 1997 season, Group A was partially replaced by the World Rally Car, with manufacturers given the option which regulations to construct to. One inherent benefit to manufacturers by adopting WRC regulations was removing the need to mass-produce road-going versions of the cars that they competed with, under the previous rules for homologation. This meant that vehicles such as the Escort RS Cosworth and Subaru Impreza Turbo no longer had to be mass-produced for general sale in order to compete at World Championship level, and thus acting as a means of attracting increased competition and involvement by manufacturers.

In due course the World Rally Car rules would bring new manufacturs into the sport, but the start of 1997 featured the same three manufacturers as the previous season. Both Ford and Subaru switched to WRC in 1997, whereas Mitsubishi stayed with Group A to maintain the links to their Mitsubishi Lancer Evolution road cars. Subaru's transition was much more gradual for similar reasons, with the early Subaru Impreza WRCs still largely Group A in nature. By mid season Toyota Team Europe were back with the new Corolla World Rally Car.

In the few years that follow, the Championship saw the added presence of WRC cars from companies such as Hyundai, Seat, Citroën, and Peugeot, who would all compete under WRC regulations without having to manufacture equivalent specialised road cars for public sale.

One major flaw in the new class system was exposed by the increasing speed of the naturally aspirated front-wheel-drive FIA 2-Litre World Rally Cup cars. The tarmac specification cars built by Peugeot and Renault that competed in the all-tarmac French and Spanish championships became major threats on WRC tarmac events Rallye Catalunya and the Tour de Corse with Gilles Panizzi defeating all but two of the WRC four-wheel-drive turbos in his Peugeot 306 Maxi, taking third place in both events.

== Calendar ==
The 1997 championship was contested over fourteen rounds in Europe, Africa, Asia, South America and Oceania. The event rotation system used in previous three seasons was dropped.

Events also became shorter and more compact, and

Rd.	Start date	Finish date	Rally	Rally headquarters	Surface	Stages	Distance
1	18 January	22 January	(Monaco) 65th Rallye Automobile Monte Carlo	Monte Carlo	Mixed	18	398.30 km
2	7 February	10 February	(Sweden) 46th International Swedish Rally	Karlstad, Värmland County	Snow	24	411.17 km
3	1 March	3 March	45th Safari Rally Kenya	Nairobi	Gravel	13	1318.0 km
4	23 March	26 March	31st TAP Rallye de Portugal	Figueira da Foz, Coimbra	Gravel	31	419.78 km
5	14 April	16 April	(Spain) 33rd Rallye Catalunya - Costa Brava - Rallye de España	Lloret de Mar, Catalonia	Tarmac	18	387.70 km
6	5 May	7 May	41st Tour de Corse - Rallye de France	Ajaccio, Corsica	Tarmac	18	408.0 km
7	22 May	25 May	17th Rally Argentina	Carlos Paz, Córdoba	Gravel	23	413.4 km
8	8 June	10 June	(Greece) 44th Acropolis Rally	Athens	Gravel	20	402.86 km
9	2 August	5 August	28th Smokefree Rally New Zealand	Manukau, Auckland	Gravel	24	395.99 km
10	29 August	31 August	47th Neste Rally Finland	Jyväskylä, Central Finland	Gravel	22	381.55 km
11	19 September	21 September	22nd Rally of Indonesia	Medan, North Sumatra	Gravel	22	402.17 km
12	12 October	15 October	(Italy) 39th Rallye Sanremo - Rallye d'Italia	Sanremo, Liguria	Tarmac	25	396.21 km
13	30 October	2 November	10th API Rally Australia	Perth, Western Australia	Gravel	24	421.42 km
14	23 November	25 November	(United Kingdom) 54th Network Q RAC Rally	Cheltenham, Gloucestershire	Gravel	26	381.11 km

== Teams and drivers ==
World Rally Car entries ineligible to score manufacturer points
Manufacturer	Car	Team	Tyre	No.	Drivers	Co-Drivers	Rounds
Mitsubishi	Lancer Evo IV	(Japan) Mitsubishi Ralliart	M	1	(Finland) Tommi Mäkinen	(Finland) Seppo Harjanne	All
Mitsubishi	Lancer Evo III	(Japan) Mitsubishi Ralliart	M	2	(Germany) Uwe Nittel	(Sweden) Tina Thörner	1–2, 5–6, 10, 12
Mitsubishi	Carisma GT Evo IV	(Japan) Mitsubishi Ralliart	M	2	(United Kingdom) Richard Burns	(United Kingdom) Robert Reid	3–4, 7–9, 11, 13–14
Mitsubishi	Lancer Evo III	(Japan) Mitsubishi Ralliart	Y	11	(Australia) Ed Ordynski	(Australia) Mark Stacey	13
Mitsubishi	Lancer Evo III	(Japan) Mitsubishi Ralliart	Y	13	(Japan) Kenjiro Shinozuka	(Lithuania) Fred Gocentas	13
Subaru	Impreza S5 WRC '97	(Japan) 555 Subaru WRT	P	3	(United Kingdom) Colin McRae	(United Kingdom) Nicky Grist	All
Subaru	Impreza S5 WRC '97	(Japan) 555 Subaru WRT	P	4	(Italy) Piero Liatti	(Italy) Fabrizia Pons	1, 5–6, 12
Subaru	Impreza S5 WRC '97	(Japan) 555 Subaru WRT	P	4	(Sweden) Kenneth Eriksson	(Sweden) Staffan Parmander	2–4, 7–11, 13–14
Subaru	Impreza S5 WRC '97	(Japan) 555 Subaru WRT	P	8	(Italy) Piero Liatti	(Italy) Fabrizia Pons	14
Subaru	Impreza 555	(Japan) 555 Subaru WRT	P	10	(New Zealand) Peter 'Possum' Bourne	(New Zealand) Craig Vincent	9
Ford	Ford Escort WRC	(United States) Ford Motor Co. Ltd.	M	5	(Spain) Carlos Sainz	(Spain) Luis Moya	All
Ford	Ford Escort WRC	(United States) Ford Motor Co. Ltd.	M	6	(Germany) Armin Schwarz	(France) Denis Giraudet	1–5
Ford	Ford Escort WRC	(United States) Ford Motor Co. Ltd.	M	6	(Germany) Armin Schwarz	(United Kingdom) Phil Mills	6
Ford	Ford Escort WRC	(United States) Ford Motor Co. Ltd.	M	6	(Finland) Juha Kankkunen	(Finland) Juha Repo	7–14
Ford	Ford Escort WRC	(United States) Ford Motor Co. Ltd.	M	16	(Italy) Angelo Medeghini	(Italy) Barbara Medeghini	14
Toyota	Corolla WRC	(Japan) Toyota Castrol Team	M	7	(France) Didier Auriol	(France) Denis Giraudet	10–14
Toyota	Corolla WRC	(Japan) Toyota Castrol Team	M	8	(Finland) Marcus Grönholm	(Finland) Timo Rautiainen	10
Toyota	Corolla WRC	(Japan) Toyota Castrol Team	M	9	(Finland) Marcus Grönholm	(Finland) Timo Rautiainen	14
Toyota	Corolla WRC	(Japan) Toyota Castrol Team	M	9	(Australia) Neal Bates	(Australia) Coral Taylor	11
Toyota	Corolla WRC	(Japan) Toyota Castrol Team	M	8	(Australia) Neal Bates	(Australia) Coral Taylor	13
Toyota	Corolla WRC	(Japan) Toyota Castrol Team	M	10	(Belgium) Freddy Loix	(Belgium) Sven Smeets	12

World Rally Car entries ineligible to score manufacturer points
Team	Manufacturer	Car	Tyre	Drivers	Co-drivers	Rounds
(United Kingdom) R.A.S. Sport	Ford	Ford Escort RS Cosworth	M	(France) Didier Auriol	(France) Jean-Marc Andrié	1
(United Kingdom) R.A.S. Sport	Ford	Ford Escort RS Cosworth	M	(Monaco) Jean-Pierre Richelmi	(France) Thierry Barjou	4, 8
(Germany) Dieter Depping	Ford	Ford Escort RS Cosworth	M	(Germany) Dieter Depping	(Germany) Dieter Hawranke	1
(Sweden) Bo-Be Plastindustri AB	Ford	Ford Escort RS Cosworth	P	(Sweden) Mats Jonsson	(Sweden) Johnny Johansson	2
(United Kingdom) Mobil Ford Motorsport	Ford	Ford Escort RS Cosworth	M	(Sweden) Stig Blomqvist	(Sweden) Benny Melander	2
(Finland) Blue Rose Team	Ford	Ford Escort RS Cosworth	M	(Finland) Jarmo Kytölehto	(Finland) Arto Kapanen	2
(Finland) Blue Rose Team	Ford	Escort WRC	M	(Finland) Jarmo Kytölehto	(Finland) Arto Kapanen	10
(Portugal) Totta Peres Competição	Ford	Escort WRC	M	(Portugal) Fernando Peres	(Portugal) Ricardo Caldeira	4
(Belgium) Belgacom Turbo Team	Ford	Escort WRC	M	(Belgium) Grégoire de Mevius	(Belgium) Jean-Marc Fortin	4, 8, 12, 14
(Greece) Leonídas Kirkos	Ford	Escort WRC	M	(Greece) Leonídas Kirkos	(Greece) Nikos Panou	8
Ford Team Finland	Ford	Escort WRC	M	(Finland) Sebastian Lindholm	(Finland) Timo Hantunen	10
(Italy) Jolly Club	Ford	Escort WRC	P	(Italy) Gianfranco Cunico	(Italy) Pierangelo Scalvini	12
(United Kingdom) Motorsport Consultancy	Ford	Escort WRC	P	(Finland) Ari Vatanen	(United Kingdom) Roger Freeman	14
(Russia) Gazprom Rally Team	Ford	Escort WRC	M	(Belgium) Bruno Thiry	(Belgium) Stéphane Prévot	14
(Russia) Gazprom Rally Team	Ford	Ford Escort RS Cosworth	M	(Russia) Alexander Zheludov	(Russia) Viktor Timkovskiy	14
Marlboro Toyota Castrol Belgium	Toyota	Celica GT-Four (ST205)	M	(Belgium) Freddy Loix	(Belgium) Sven Smeets	1, 4, 8, 10, 13
(Germany) Toyota Castrol Deutschland	Toyota	Celica GT-Four (ST205)	P	(Germany) Isolde Holderied	(France) Catherine François	1
Toyota Denmark Rally Team	Toyota	Celica GT-Four (ST205)	M	(Denmark) Henrik Lundgaard	(Denmark) Freddy Pedersen	1
Toyota Castrol Team Sweden	Toyota	Celica GT-Four (ST205)	M	(Sweden) Thomas Rådström	(Sweden) Lars Bäckman	2
Toyota Castrol Team Sweden	Toyota	Celica GT-Four (ST205)	M	(Sweden) Thomas Rådström	(France) Denis Giraudet	8
Toyota Castrol Team Sweden	Toyota	Celica GT-Four (ST205)	M	(Sweden) 'Gullabo'	(Sweden) Pecka Svensson	2
Toyota Castrol Team Sweden	Toyota	Celica GT-Four (ST205)	M	(Finland) Marcus Grönholm	(Finland) Timo Rautiainen	2
Toyota Kenya	Toyota	Celica GT-Four (ST205)	M	(Kenya) Ian Duncan	(Kenya) David Williamson	3
Toyota Castrol Finland	Toyota	Celica GT-Four (ST205)	M	(Finland) Marcus Grönholm	(Finland) Timo Rautiainen	4
(Italy) H.F. Grifone SRL	Toyota	Celica GT-Four (ST205)	M	(Argentina) Raúl Sufan	(Argentina) Martin Christie	4–5, 7–13
(Italy) H.F. Grifone SRL	Toyota	Celica GT-Four (ST205)	M	(Finland) Marcus Grönholm	(Finland) Timo Rautiainen	7
(Italy) H.F. Grifone SRL	Toyota	Celica GT-Four (ST205)	M	(France) Didier Auriol	(France) Denis Giraudet	7
(Italy) H.F. Grifone SRL	Toyota	Celica GT-Four (ST205)	M	(Italy) Andrea Aghini	(Italy) Loris Roggia	12
(Italy) H.F. Grifone SRL	Toyota	Celica GT-Four (ST205)	M	(Italy) Pier Lorenzo Zanchi	(Italy) Dario D'Esposito	12
Toyota Team Australia	Toyota	Celica GT-Four (ST205)	D	(Australia) Neal Bates	(Australia) Coral Taylor	9
(Finland) Shell Helix Motor Oils	Toyota	Celica GT-Four (ST205)	M	(Finland) Pasi Hagström	(Finland) Tero Gardemeister	10
(Japan) Tein Sport	Toyota	Celica GT-Four (ST205)	M	(Japan) Yoshio Fujimoto	(Sweden) Arne Hertz	11, 13
(Kenya) Jonathan Toroitich	Toyota	Celica Turbo 4WD (ST185)	F	(Kenya) Jonathan Toroitich	(Kenya) Ibrahim Choge	3
(Switzerland) Olivier Burri	Subaru	Impreza 555	P	(Switzerland) Olivier Burri	(Switzerland) Christophe Hofmann	1
(France) F.Dor Rally Team	Subaru	Impreza 555	P	(France) Frédéric Dor	(United Kingdom) Kevin Gormley	3, 9
(France) F.Dor Rally Team	Subaru	Impreza 555	P	(France) Frédéric Dor	(France) Didier Breton	4, 8, 10
(France) F.Dor Rally Team	Subaru	Impreza S5 WRC '97	P	(France) Frédéric Dor	(France) Didier Breton	12
(Japan) Subaru Allstars	Subaru	Impreza 555	P	(Portugal) Rui Madeira	(Portugal) Nuno Rodrigues da Silva	4–5
(Japan) Subaru Allstars	Subaru	Impreza 555	P	(Japan) Yukihiko Sakurai	(Republic of Ireland) Ronan Morgan	4, 8, 14
(Japan) Impreza Recaro Fujitsubo	Subaru	Impreza 555	D	(Japan) Masao Kamioka	(United Kingdom) Kevin Gormley	4, 8, 14
(Italy) A.R.T Engineering	Subaru	Impreza 555	P	(Italy) Angelo Medeghini	(Italy) Barbara Medeghini	5, 10
(Italy) A.R.T Engineering	Subaru	Impreza 555	P	(Italy) Andrea Navarra	(Italy) Renzo Casazza	8
(Italy) A.R.T Engineering	Subaru	Impreza 555	P	(Italy) Andrea Navarra	(Italy) Alessandro Alessandrini	12, 14
(Italy) A.R.T Engineering	Subaru	Impreza 555	P	(Italy) Massimo Ercolani	(Italy) Antonio Borri	12
(Greece) Armodios Vovos	Subaru	Impreza 555	P	(Greece) Armodios Vovos	(Greece) Ioánnis Alvanos	8
(New Zealand) Joe McAndrew	Subaru	Impreza 555	P	(New Zealand) Joe McAndrew	(New Zealand) Bob Haldane	9
(Italy) Procar Rally Team	Subaru	Impreza 555	P	(Italy) Andrea Dallavilla	(Italy) Danilo Fappani	12
(Italy) Procar Rally Team	Subaru	Impreza 555	P	(Italy) Diego Oldrati	(Italy) Paolo Lizzi	12
(Italy) Renato Travaglia	Subaru	Impreza 555		(Italy) Renato Travaglia	(Italy) Flavio Zanella	12
(Poland) Mobil 1 Stomil Olsztyn	Subaru	Impreza 555	M	(Poland) Krzysztof Hołowczyc	(Poland) Maciej Wisławski	14
Subaru Rally Team Australia	Subaru	Impreza 555	P	(New Zealand) Peter 'Possum' Bourne	(New Zealand) Craig Vincent	9, 13
Mitsubishi Ralliart Germany	Mitsubishi	Lancer Evo III	P	(Germany) Uwe Nittel	(Sweden) Christina Thörner	8
Ralliart New Zealand	Mitsubishi	Lancer Evo IV	F	(New Zealand) Geoff Argyle	(New Zealand) Raymond Bennett	9

=== FIA 2-Litre World Rally Cup Major Entries ===
Team	Manufacturer	Car	Tyre	Drivers	Co-drivers	Rounds
(Czech Republic) Škoda Motorsport	Škoda	Felicia Kit Car	M	(Czech Republic) Emil Triner	(Czech Republic) Julius Gál	1
(Czech Republic) Škoda Motorsport	Škoda	Felicia Kit Car	M	(Czech Republic) Emil Triner	(Czech Republic) Karel Jirátko	2, 4–5, 7–8
(Czech Republic) Škoda Motorsport	Škoda	Felicia Kit Car	M	(Czech Republic) Emil Triner	(Czech Republic) Miloš Hůlka	10
(Czech Republic) Škoda Motorsport	Škoda	Octavia Kit Car	M	(Czech Republic) Emil Triner	(Czech Republic) Miloš Hůlka	12–13
(Czech Republic) Škoda Motorsport	Škoda	Felicia Kit Car	M	(Czech Republic) Pavel Sibera	(Czech Republic) Petr Gross	1–2, 4–5, 7–8, 13
(Czech Republic) Škoda Motorsport	Škoda	Octavia Kit Car	M	(Czech Republic) Pavel Sibera	(Czech Republic) Petr Gross	10, 12
(Czech Republic) Škoda Motorsport	Škoda	Felicia Kit Car	M	(Czech Republic) Jindřich Štolfa	(Czech Republic) Miroslav Fanta	10, 12
(Czech Republic) Škoda Motorsport	Škoda	Felicia Kit Car	M	(Italy) Fabio Danti	(Italy) Marcello Olivari	12
(Belgium) East Belgian Racing Team	Škoda	Felicia Kit Car	M	(Belgium) Bernard Munster	(Belgium) Jean-François Elst	14
(Spain) SEAT Sport	SEAT	Ibiza Kit Car	M	(Finland) Harri Rovanperä	(Finland) Voitto Silander	1, 4–5, 7
(Spain) SEAT Sport	SEAT	Ibiza Kit Car Evo2	M	(Finland) Harri Rovanperä	(Finland) Voitto Silander	9–14
(Spain) SEAT Sport	SEAT	Ibiza Kit Car	M	(Spain) Oriol Gómez	(Spain) Marc Martí	1, 5, 7, 14
(Spain) SEAT Sport	SEAT	Ibiza Kit Car Evo2	M	(Spain) Oriol Gómez	(Spain) Marc Martí	8–13
(Spain) SEAT Sport	SEAT	Ibiza Kit Car	M	(Germany) Erwin Weber	(Germany) Manfred Hiemer	4
(Spain) SEAT Sport	SEAT	Ibiza Kit Car Evo2	M	(Germany) Erwin Weber	(Germany) Manfred Hiemer	8, 11
(Spain) SEAT Sport	SEAT	Ibiza Kit Car	M	(Belgium) Bruno Thiry	(Belgium) Stéphane Prévot	5
(Spain) SEAT Sport	SEAT	Ibiza Kit Car	M	(Belgium) Renaud Verreydt	(Belgium) Dominique Dricot	12
(Spain) SEAT Sport	SEAT	Ibiza Kit Car Evo2	M	(United Kingdom) Gwyndaf Evans	(United Kingdom) Howard Davies	14
(United Kingdom) David Higgins	SEAT	Ibiza Kit Car	M	(United Kingdom) David Higgins	(Republic of Ireland) Rory Kennedy	14
(Greece) Technocar	SEAT	Ibiza GTi 16V		(Greece) "Stratissino"	(Greece) Giorgos Petropoulos	8
Andorra Auto Club	SEAT	Ibiza GTi 16V	M	(Andorra) Ferran Font	(Andorra) Eduard Andueza	4, 8
Andorra Auto Club	SEAT	Ibiza GTi 16V	M	(Andorra) Ferran Font	(Spain) Joan Sureda	11
(Portugal) Vítor Pascoal	SEAT	Ibiza GTi 16V		(Portugal) Vítor Pascoal	(Portugal) Duarte Costa	4
Volkswagen Motorsport Sweden	Volkswagen	Golf III GTi 16V		(Sweden) Jörgen Jonasson	(Sweden) Nicklas Jonasson	2
Volkswagen Motorsport Sweden	Volkswagen	Golf III GTi 16V		(Sweden) Harry Joki	(Sweden) Ingemar Karlsson	2
(Finland) Blue Rose Team	Volkswagen	Golf III Kit Car		(Finland) Tapio Laukkanen	(Finland) Risto Mannisenmäki	2, 10
(United Kingdom) S.B.G. Sport	Volkswagen	Golf III Kit Car	P	(United Kingdom) Alister McRae	(United Kingdom) David Senior	2, 4, 13–14
Opel Team Sweden	Opel	Astra GSi 16V	M	(Sweden) Per Svan	(Sweden) Johan Olsson	2, 10, 14
(Italy) Hawk Racing Club Srl	Opel	Astra GSi 16V		(Italy) Sandro Sottile	(Italy) Piero Barbieri	12
(Italy) Scuderia Dei Fiori	Opel	Corsa B GSi		(Italy) Andrea Maselli	(Italy) Nicola Arena	12
Renault Team Sweden	Renault	Mégane Maxi	P	(Sweden) Jonas Kruse	(Sweden) Anders Olsson	2
Renault Team Sweden	Renault	Mégane Maxi	P	(Sweden) Jonas Kruse	(Sweden) Håkan Ekholm	10
(Portugal) Renault Gest Galp	Renault	Mégane Maxi	M	(Portugal) José Carlos Macedo	(Portugal) Miguel Borges	4
(Portugal) Renault Gest Galp	Renault	Mégane Maxi	M	(Portugal) Pedro Azeredo	(Portugal) Fernando Prata	4
(Austria) Remus Racing	Renault	Mégane Maxi	P	(Austria) Raphael Sperrer	(Sweden) Per Carlsson	4–5, 10, 12
(Spain) Renault Sport España	Renault	Mégane Maxi	M	(Spain) Miguel Martínez-Conde	(Spain) Felipe Alonso Fernández	5
(France) Société Diac	Renault	Mégane Maxi	M	(France) Philippe Bugalski	(France) Jean-Paul Chiaroni	6
(France) Société Diac	Renault	Mégane Maxi	M	(France) Serge Jordan	(France) Jack Boyère	6
(Greece) "Leonidas"	Renault	Mégane Maxi	M	(Greece) "Leonidas"	(Greece) Maria Pavli-Korre	8
(Italy) Italian Promotor Sport	Renault	Mégane Maxi	M	(Italy) Corrado Fontana	(Italy) Daniele Pelliccioni	12
(Italy) Italian Promotor Sport	Renault	Mégane Maxi	M	(Italy) Paolo Andreucci	(Italy) Simona Fedeli	12
(United Kingdom) Renault Dealer Rallying UK	Renault	Mégane Maxi	M	(United Kingdom) Robbie Head	(United Kingdom) Bryan Thomas	14
(United Kingdom) Renault Dealer Rallying UK	Renault	Mégane Maxi	M	(United Kingdom) Martin Rowe	(United Kingdom) Nicky Beech	14
(Sweden) Mikael Bonnevier	Renault	Clio Williams		(Sweden) Mikael Bonnevier	(Sweden) Peter Johansson	2
(Greece) "Dim"	Renault	Clio Williams		(Greece) "Dim"	(Greece) Konstantinos Stefanis	8
(Argentina) Oscar Chiaramello	Renault	18 GTX		(Argentina) Oscar Chiaramello	(Argentina) Fernando Chiaramello	7
(Argentina) Ricardo Costanzo	Renault	18 GTX		(Argentina) Ricardo Costanzo	(Argentina) Jose Claudio Ocampo	7
Promoracing Finland	Nissan	Sunny GTi		(Finland) Toni Gardemeister	(Finland) Paavo Lukander	2, 10
(United Kingdom) Nissan Motorsports Europe	Nissan	Micra Kit Car	Y	(United Kingdom) Mark Higgins	(United Kingdom) Phil Mills	10
(United Kingdom) Nissan Motorsports Europe	Nissan	Micra Kit Car	Y	(Japan) Masahiro Takasaki	(Japan) Hiroaki Hamada	9–13
(United Kingdom) Nissan Motorsports Europe	Nissan	Micra Kit Car	Y	(United Kingdom) Geoff Jones	(United Kingdom) Rhydian Welson	5–6
(United Kingdom) Nissan Motorsports Europe	Nissan	Almera Kit Car	Y	(United Kingdom) Mark Higgins	(United Kingdom) Phil Mills	14
(Australia) Silverstone Rally Tyre Team	Proton	Satria Kit Car	S	(Australia) Russell Palmer	(Australia) Brian Harwood	3
(Kenya) Azar Anwar	Daewoo	Cielo		(Kenya) Azar Anwar	(Kenya) Arshad Khan	3
(Kenya) Rory Green	Hyundai	Elantra		(Kenya) Rory Green	(Kenya) Orson Taylor	3
(Kenya) Jimmy Wahome	Hyundai	Elantra		(Kenya) Jimmy Wahome	(Kenya) Tom Muriuki	3
(Australia) Hyundai Rally Sport	Hyundai	Coupé		(Australia) Robert Nicoli	(Australia) Jim Carlton	9, 13
(Australia) Hyundai Rally Sport	Hyundai	Coupé		(Australia) Wayne Bell	(Australia) Iain Stewart	9, 11, 13
(Australia) Dean Herridge	Hyundai	Coupé	M	(Australia) Dean Herridge	(Australia) Lyndall Drake	13
(United Kingdom) Jimmy McRae	Hyundai	Accent X3	M	(United Kingdom) Jimmy McRae	(United Kingdom) Rob Arthur	14
(Portugal) Peugeot Esso Competição	Peugeot	306 Maxi	M	(Portugal) Adruzilo Lopes	(Portugal) Luís Lisboa	4
(France) Peugeot Sport	Peugeot	306 Maxi	M	(France) Gilles Panizzi	(France) Herve Panizzi	5–6
(France) Peugeot Sport	Peugeot	306 Maxi	M	(France) François Delecour	(France) Daniel Grataloup	5–6
(Spain) Peugeot Sport España	Peugeot	306 Maxi	M	(Spain) Jaime Azcona	(Germany) Julius Billmaier	5
(France) "Fabrou"	Peugeot	106 XSi		(France) "Fabrou"	(France) Marc Boyer	4
(Spain) Ford España	Ford	Escort Maxi Kit Car	M	(Spain) Daniel Alonso Villarón	(Spain) Salvador Belzunces	5
(Spain) Citroën Hispania	Citroën	ZX Kit Car	M	(Spain) Jesús Puras	(Spain) Marc Martí	5
(France) Citroën Sport	Citroën	Saxo Kit Car	M	(France) Patrick Magaud	(France) Michel Périn	6
(Greece) Kostas Argiriou	Toyota	Starlet EP91		(Greece) Kostas Argiriou	(Greece) Tzannis Vlahos	8
(Japan) Silverstone Suzuki Sport	Suzuki	Baleno Wagon Kit Car	S	(Japan) Nobuhiro Tajima	(Australia) Ross Runnalls	9
(Japan) Silverstone Suzuki Sport	Suzuki	Baleno Wagon Kit Car	S	(Japan) Nobuhiro Tajima	(New Zealand) Glenn Macneall	11
(Japan) Silverstone Suzuki Sport	Suzuki	Baleno Wagon Kit Car	S	(Japan) Nobuhiro Tajima	(Australia) Claire Parker	13
(Indonesia) Timor Motorsport	Timor	S 515i		(Indonesia) Andy Yachmoon	(Indonesia) Ichwan Habib Nasution	11
(Indonesia) Timor Motorsport	Timor	S 515i		(Indonesia) Faried Thalib	(Indonesia) Bambang Gunawan	11
(United Kingdom) Honda UK Rally Team	Honda	Civic	D	(United Kingdom) Neil Wearden	(United Kingdom) Trevor Agnew	12, 14
Daihatsu Australia	Daihatsu	Charade GTi		(Australia) Ross Mackenzie	(Australia) Tony Brandon	13
Daihatsu Australia	Daihatsu	Charade GTi		(Australia) Rick Bates	(United Kingdom) Jenny Brittan	13
(South Korea) Kia Motorsport Korea	Kia	Sephia		(South Korea) Park Jeong-Ryong	(Australia) Damien Long	13

=== Group N Cup major entries ===
Team	Manufacturer	Car	Tyre	Drivers	Co-drivers	Rounds
Mitsubishi Ralliart Germany	Mitsubishi	Lancer Evo III	P	(Uruguay) Gustavo Trelles	(Argentina) Jorge Del Buono	1–2, 4–5, 7–10, 12
Mitsubishi Ralliart Germany	Mitsubishi	Lancer Evo III	P	(Austria) Manfred Stohl	(Germany) Dieter Schneppenheim	1
Mitsubishi Ralliart Germany	Mitsubishi	Lancer Evo III	P	(Austria) Manfred Stohl	(Austria) Peter Müller	2, 4–5, 7
Mitsubishi Ralliart Germany	Mitsubishi	Lancer Evo IV	P	(Austria) Manfred Stohl	(Austria) Peter Müller	10, 12
Mitsubishi Ralliart Germany	Mitsubishi	Lancer Evo III	P	(Spain) Luis Climent	(Spain) Álex Romaní	4–6, 8, 13–14
Mitsubishi Ralliart Germany	Mitsubishi	Lancer Evo IV	P	(Spain) Luis Climent	(Spain) Álex Romaní	10
(Germany) Paulaner Team	Mitsubishi	Lancer Evo III	P	(Germany) Armin Kremer	(Germany) Sven Behling	1
Mitsubishi Ralliart Sweden	Mitsubishi	Lancer Evo III	M	(Sweden) Kenneth Bäcklund	(Sweden) Tord Andersson	2
Mitsubishi Ralliart Sweden	Mitsubishi	Lancer Evo III	M	(Sweden) Stig-Olov Walfridsson	(Sweden) Gunnar Barth	2
Mitsubishi Ralliart Finland	Mitsubishi	Lancer Evo III	M	(Finland) Juha Kangas	(Finland) Jani Laaksonen	2, 10
Mitsubishi Ralliart Finland	Mitsubishi	Lancer Carisma GT Evo IV	M	(Finland) Jouko Puhakka	(Finland) Keijo Eerola	10
(Sweden) Bilsport Magazine	Mitsubishi	Lancer Evo II		(Sweden) Gert Blomqvist	(Sweden) Lena Lindberg	2
(Sweden) Helmia Motorsport	Mitsubishi	Lancer Evo III		(Sweden) Pernilla Solberg	(Sweden) Sven-Olov Kvarnlöv	2
(Sweden) Helmia Motorsport	Mitsubishi	Lancer Evo III		(Sweden) Pernilla Solberg	(Sweden) Linda Walfridsson	14
(Poland) Sobiesław Zasada	Mitsubishi	Lancer Evo III		(Poland) Sobiesław Zasada	(Poland) Ewa Zasada	3
(Austria) Kurt Göttlicher	Mitsubishi	Lancer Evo III		(Austria) Kurt Göttlicher	(Austria) Petra Heider	3–4, 7–10
(Italy) Antonello Fidanza	Mitsubishi	Lancer Evo III		(Italy) Antonello Fidanza	(Italy) Raffaele Farina	5, 12
(France) Jacques Andreani	Mitsubishi	Lancer Evo III	M	(France) Jacques Andreani	(France) Claude Blanc-Raffini	6
(Argentina) Jorge Recalde	Mitsubishi	Lancer Evo III		(Argentina) Jorge Recalde	(Argentina) José Garcia	7
Ralliart New Zealand	Mitsubishi	Lancer Evo IV		(New Zealand) Reece Jones	(New Zealand) Leo Bult	9
Ralliart New Zealand	Mitsubishi	Lancer Evo III		(New Zealand) Reece Jones	(United Kingdom) Eurig Evans	13–14
(New Zealand) Todd Bawden	Mitsubishi	Lancer Evo IV		(New Zealand) Todd Bawden	(New Zealand) Jeff Grove	9
(Japan) Hikaru Teshigawara	Mitsubishi	Lancer Evo IV		(Japan) Hikaru Teshigawara	(Japan) Tadayoshi Sato	9
(Finland) Vatosua	Mitsubishi	Lancer Evo IV		(Finland) Olli Harkki	(Finland) Kari Mustalahti	10, 14
Team Pomi Finland	Mitsubishi	Lancer Evo IV		(Finland) Marko Ipatti	(Finland) Kari Kajula	10
(Japan) Advan-Piaa Rally Team	Mitsubishi	Lancer Evo III	Y	(Japan) Yoshihiro Kataoka	(Japan) Satoshi Hayashi	11, 13
Mitsubishi Ralliart Indonesia	Mitsubishi	Lancer Evo IV		(Indonesia) Arief Indiarto	(Indonesia) Firman Barototomo	11
Mitsubishi Ralliart Indonesia	Mitsubishi	Lancer Evo IV		(Indonesia) Bambang Hartono	(Indonesia) Agung Baskoro	11
(Japan) Masayuki Akaba	Mitsubishi	Lancer Evo III		(Japan) Masayuki Akaba	(Japan) Takako Akaba	11, 13
(Indonesia) Goro Rally Team	Mitsubishi	Lancer Evo IV		(Indonesia) Tommy Suharto	(Indonesia) Jeffrey Jarang Pulang	11
(Indonesia) Goro Rally Team	Mitsubishi	Lancer Evo IV		(Indonesia) Ricardo Gelael	(Indonesia) Hervian Soejono	11
(Italy) Ralliart Italia	Mitsubishi	Lancer Evo V		(Italy) Mario Stagni	(Italy) Enrico Brazzoli	12
(Italy) Luca Baldini	Mitsubishi	Lancer Evo III		(Italy) Luca Baldini	(Italy) Massimo Agostinelli	12
(Slovenia) Boris Popovič	Mitsubishi	Lancer Evo III		(Slovenia) Boris Popovič	(Slovenia) Roman Leljak	12
(Italy) Fabrizio Gallio	Mitsubishi	Lancer Evo IV		(Italy) Fabrizio Gallio	(Italy) Daniele De Luis	12
(United Kingdom) Jeremy Easson	Mitsubishi	Lancer Evo III	D	(United Kingdom) Jeremy Easson	(United Kingdom) Alun Cook	14
(United Kingdom) Julian Porter	Mitsubishi	Lancer Evo III		(United Kingdom) Julian Porter	(United Kingdom) Claire Mole	14
(Germany) Proton Kathrein Rallye Team	Proton	Wira Evo III	P	(Germany) Hermann Gaßner sen.	(Germany) Siegfried Schrankl	1, 12
(Malaysia) Petronas EON Racing Team	Proton	Wira 4WD	Y	(Malaysia) Karamjit Singh	(Malaysia) Allen Oh	9, 11, 13
(Malaysia) Petronas EON Racing Team	Proton	Wira 4WD	Y	(Japan) Katsuhiko Taguchi	(Colombia) Fred Gocentas	9
(Malaysia) Petronas EON Racing Team	Proton	Wira 4WD	Y	(Japan) Katsuhiko Taguchi	(Malaysia) Roland Pickering	13
(Malaysia) Petronas EON Racing Team	Proton	Wira 4WD	Y	(Malaysia) Saladin Mazlan	(Malaysia) Jagdev Singh	11
(Kenya) Johnny Hellier	Subaru	Impreza WRX		(Kenya) Johnny Hellier	(Italy) Stefano Rocca	3
(Portugal) Escudería Sur	Subaru	Impreza WRX		(Portugal) Carlos Marques	(Portugal) Álvaro Ferreira	4
(Austria) Remus Racing	Subaru	Impreza WRX		(Austria) Achim Mörtl	(Austria) Ilka Minor	6
(Argentina) Roberto Sanchez	Subaru	Impreza WRX		(Argentina) Roberto Sanchez	(Argentina) Edgardo Galindo	7
(Paraguay) Aurelino González	Subaru	Impreza WRX		(Paraguay) Aurelino González	(Argentina) Carlos Zarza	7
(Japan) Hiroshi Nishiyama	Subaru	Impreza WRX	B	(Japan) Hiroshi Nishiyama	(Japan) Hisashi Yamaguchi	8, 14
(New Zealand) 'Stumpy'	Subaru	Impreza WRX		(New Zealand) 'Stumpy'	(New Zealand) Daryll Judd	9
Subaru Rally Team Japan	Subaru	Impreza WRX		(Japan) Hideaki Miyoshi	(Japan) Yoshimasa Nakahara	9, 11, 13
Subaru Rally Team Japan	Subaru	Impreza WRX		(Japan) Yoshihiro Kataoka	(Japan) Satoshi Hayashi	9
Subaru Rally Team Japan	Subaru	Impreza WRX		(Japan) Toshihiro Arai	(Japan) Toshio Omizo	13
(Japan) Tein Sport Junior Team	Subaru	Impreza WRX	M	(Japan) Shigeyuki Konishi	(New Zealand) Tony Sircombe	9, 11, 13
Team 555 China	Subaru	Impreza WRX		(China) Yong Zhou	(China) Xue Zhong Chen	11
Team 555 China	Subaru	Impreza WRX		(China) Tong Chun Xian	(China) Jia Li	11
(Australia) Les Walkden Racing	Subaru	Impreza WRX		(Australia) Michael Guest	(Australia) David Green	13
(Australia) Rob Herridge	Subaru	Impreza WRX		(Australia) Rob Herridge	(Australia) Chris Randell	13
(Greece) Vassilis Apostolou	Subaru	Legacy RS		(Greece) Vassilis Apostolou	(Greece) Emmanouel Kalogeropoulos	8
Subaru Rally Team Australia	Subaru	Impreza WRX STi RA	P	(New Zealand) Greg Graham	(Australia) Glenn Macneall	9
(Kenya) Azar Anwar	Daewoo	Cielo		(Kenya) Azar Anwar	(Kenya) Arshad Khan	3
(United Kingdom) Mark Tilbury	Nissan	Pulsar GTi-R		(United Kingdom) Mark Tilbury	(Kenya) Bill Kirk	3
(Greece) Vassilis Halkias	Nissan	Sunny GTI-R		(Greece) Vassilis Halkias	(Greece) Mihalis Patrikoussis	8
(Kenya) Jim Kahumbura	Toyota	Celica GT-Four (ST205)		(Kenya) Jim Kahumbura	(Kenya) Dave Macharia	3
(Kenya) Chitranjan Patel	Ford	Escort RS Cosworth		(Kenya) Chitranjan Patel	(Kenya) Shailen Shah	3
(Portugal) Horácio Franco	Ford	Escort RS Cosworth		(Portugal) Horácio Franco	(Portugal) Tiago Mourão	4
(France) Jean-Marie Santoni	Ford	Escort RS Cosworth		(France) Jean-Marie Santoni	(France) Jean-Marc Casamatta	6
(Spain) JLM Team	Peugeot	106 Rallye	M	(Spain) David Nafría	(Spain) F. Gallego	5
(Spain) Gamace MC Competición	Peugeot	106 Rallye	M	(Spain) Jordi Grinyó	(Spain) Samira Lanaya	5
(Spain) Escudería La Coruña	Peugeot	106 Rallye	M	(Spain) Amador Vidal Cernadas	(Spain) Roberto Mosquera López	5
(France) Philippe Fons	Renault	Clio Williams		(France) Philippe Fons	(France) Olivier Pieri	6
(France) Jean-Michel Pietri	Renault	Clio Williams		(France) Jean-Michel Pietri	(France) Jean-Charles Mondoloni	6
(France) Erick Antona	Renault	Clio Williams		(France) Erick Antona	(France) Jean-Charles Pianelli	6
(Greece) Pavlos Moschoutis	Mazda	323 GT-R	M	(Greece) Pavlos Moschoutis	(Greece) Giórgos Kouris	8

== Results and standings ==
=== Rally results ===
Rd.	Rally	Overall winners	Group N Cup Winners	2.0 L WC winners	Report
1	(Monaco) Monte Carlo	(Japan) No. 4 555 Subaru WRT	No. 23 Mitsubishi Ralliart Germany	(Czech Republic) No. 20 Škoda Motorsport	Report
1	(Monaco) Monte Carlo	(Japan) Subaru Impreza S5 WRC '97	(Japan) Mitsubishi Lancer Evo III	(Czech Republic) Škoda Felicia Kit Car	Report
1	(Monaco) Monte Carlo	(Italy) Piero Liatti (Italy) Fabrizia Pons	(Uruguay) Gustavo Trelles (Argentina) Jorge Del Buono	(Czech Republic) Emil Triner (Czech Republic) Julius Gál	Report
2	Sweden	(Japan) No. 4 555 Subaru WRT	No. 16 Mitsubishi Ralliart Sweden	No. 28 Volkswagen Motorsport Sweden	Report
2	Sweden	(Japan) Subaru Impreza S5 WRC '97	(Japan) Mitsubishi Lancer Evo III	(Germany) Volkswagen Golf III GTi 16V	Report
2	Sweden	(Sweden) Kenneth Eriksson (Sweden) Staffan Parmander	(Sweden) Kenneth Bäcklund (Sweden) Tord Andersson	(Sweden) Jörgen Jonasson (Sweden) Nicklas Jonasson	Report
3	Kenya	(Japan) No. 3 555 Subaru WRT	(Kenya) No. 26 Johnny Hellier	(Australia) No. 41 Silverstone Rally Tyre Team	Report
3	Kenya	(Japan) Subaru Impreza S5 WRC '97	(Japan) Subaru Impreza WRX	(Malaysia) Proton Satria	Report
3	Kenya	(United Kingdom) Colin McRae (United Kingdom) Nicky Grist	(Kenya) Johnny Hellier (Italy) Stefano Rocca	(Australia) Michael Guest (Australia) David Green	Report
4	Portugal	(Japan) No. 1 Mitsubishi Ralliart	No. 24 Mitsubishi Ralliart Germany	(United Kingdom) No. 12 S.B.G. Sport	Report
4	Portugal	(Japan) Mitsubishi Lancer Evo IV	(Japan) Mitsubishi Lancer Evo III	(Germany) Volkswagen Golf III Kit Car	Report
4	Portugal	(Finland) Tommi Mäkinen (Finland) Seppo Harjanne	(Uruguay) Gustavo Trelles (Argentina) Jorge Del Buono	(United Kingdom) Alister McRae (United Kingdom) David Senior	Report
5	Spain	(Japan) No. 1 Mitsubishi Ralliart	No. 24 Mitsubishi Ralliart Germany	(France) No. 11 Peugeot Sport	Report
5	Spain	(Japan) Mitsubishi Lancer Evo IV	(Japan) Mitsubishi Lancer Evo III	(France) Peugeot 306 Maxi	Report
5	Spain	(Finland) Tommi Mäkinen (Finland) Seppo Harjanne	(Uruguay) Gustavo Trelles (Argentina) Jorge Del Buono	(France) Gilles Panizzi (France) Hervé Panizzi	Report
6	France	(Japan) No. 3 555 Subaru WRT	(France) No. 17 Jean-Marie Santoni	(France) No. 7 Peugeot Sport	Report
6	France	(Japan) Subaru Impreza S5 WRC '97	(United States) Ford Escort RS Cosworth	(France) Peugeot 306 Maxi	Report
6	France	(United Kingdom) Colin McRae (United Kingdom) Nicky Grist	(France) Jean-Marie Santoni (France) Jean-Marc Casamatta	(France) Gilles Panizzi (France) Hervé Panizzi	Report
7	Argentina	(Japan) No. 1 Mitsubishi Ralliart	No. 24 Mitsubishi Ralliart Germany	(Spain) No. 11 Seat Sport	Report
7	Argentina	(Japan) Mitsubishi Lancer Evo IV	(Japan) Mitsubishi Lancer Evo III	(Spain) Seat Ibiza Kit Car	Report
7	Argentina	(Finland) Tommi Mäkinen (Finland) Seppo Harjanne	(Uruguay) Gustavo Trelles (Argentina) Jorge Del Buono	(Finland) Harri Rovanperä (Finland) Voitto Silander	Report
8	Greece	(United States) No. 5 Ford Motor Co. Ltd.	No. 15 Mitsubishi Ralliart Germany	(Spain) No. 22 Seat Sport	Report
8	Greece	(United States) Ford Escort WRC	(Japan) Mitsubishi Lancer Evo III	(Spain) Seat Ibiza Kit Car Evo2	Report
8	Greece	(Spain) Carlos Sainz (Spain) Luis Moya	(Uruguay) Gustavo Trelles (Argentina) Jorge Del Buono	(Spain) Oriol Gómez (Spain) Marc Martí	Report
9	New Zealand	(Japan) No. 4 555 Subaru WRT	No. 7 Mitsubishi Ralliart Germany	(Spain) No. 11 Seat Sport	Report
9	New Zealand	(Japan) Subaru Impreza S5 WRC '97	(Japan) Mitsubishi Lancer Evo III	(Spain) Seat Ibiza Kit Car Evo2	Report
9	New Zealand	(Sweden) Kenneth Eriksson (Sweden) Staffan Parmander	(Uruguay) Gustavo Trelles (Argentina) Jorge Del Buono	(Spain) Oriol Gómez (Spain) Marc Martí	Report
10	Finland	(Japan) No. 1 Mitsubishi Ralliart	No. 17 Mitsubishi Ralliart Finland	(Spain) No. 21 Seat Sport	Report
10	Finland	(Japan) Mitsubishi Lancer Evo IV	(Japan) Mitsubishi Carisma GT Evo IV	(Spain) Seat Ibiza Kit Car Evo2	Report
10	Finland	(Finland) Tommi Mäkinen (Finland) Seppo Harjanne	(Finland) Jouko Puhakka (Finland) Keijo Eerola	(Finland) Harri Rovanperä (Finland) Voitto Silander	Report
11	Indonesia	(United States) No. 5 Ford Motor Co. Ltd.	(Malaysia) No. 19 Petronas EON Racing Team	(Spain) No. 11 Seat Sport	Report
11	Indonesia	(United States) Ford Escort WRC	(Malaysia) Proton Wira 4WD	(Spain) Seat Ibiza Kit Car Evo2	Report
11	Indonesia	(Spain) Carlos Sainz (Spain) Luis Moya	(Malaysia) Karamjit Singh (Malaysia) Allen Oh	(Finland) Harri Rovanperä (Finland) Voitto Silander	Report
12	Italy	(Japan) No. 3 555 Subaru WRT	(Italy) No. 47 Ralliart Italia	(Spain) No. 25 Seat Sport	Report
12	Italy	(Japan) Subaru Impreza S5 WRC '97	(Japan) Mitsubishi Lancer Evo V	(Spain) Seat Ibiza Kit Car Evo2	Report
12	Italy	(United Kingdom) Colin McRae (United Kingdom) Nicky Grist	(Italy) Mario Stagni (Italy) Enrico Brazzoli	(Finland) Harri Rovanperä (Finland) Voitto Silander	Report
13	Australia	(Japan) No. 3 555 Subaru WRT	(Japan) No. 25 Tein Sport Junior Team	(Spain) No. 16 Seat Sport	Report
13	Australia	(Japan) Subaru Impreza S5 WRC '97	(Japan) Subaru Impreza WRX	(Spain) Seat Ibiza Kit Car Evo2	Report
13	Australia	(United Kingdom) Colin McRae (United Kingdom) Nicky Grist	(Japan) Shigeyuki Konishi (New Zealand) Tony Sircombe	(Finland) Harri Rovanperä (Finland) Voitto Silander	Report
14	(United Kingdom) Britain	(Japan) No. 3 555 Subaru WRT	No. 29 Mitsubishi Ralliart Germany	(Spain) No. 27 Seat Sport	Report
14	(United Kingdom) Britain	(Japan) Subaru Impreza S5 WRC '97	(Japan) Mitsubishi Lancer Evo III	(Spain) Seat Ibiza Kit Car Evo2	Report
14	(United Kingdom) Britain	(United Kingdom) Colin McRae (United Kingdom) Nicky Grist	(Spain) Luis Climent (Spain) Álex Romaní	(Finland) Harri Rovanperä (Finland) Voitto Silander	Report

=== Drivers' championship ===
Pos.	Driver	MON (Monaco)	SWE (Sweden)	KEN (Kenya)	POR (Portugal)	ESP (Spain)	FRA (France)	ARG (Argentina)	GRE (Greece)	NZL (New Zealand)	FIN (Finland)	INA (Indonesia)	ITA (Italy)	AUS (Australia)	GBR (United Kingdom)	Pts
1	(Finland) Tommi Mäkinen	3	3	Ret	1	1	Ret	1	3	Ret	1	Ret	3	2	6	63
2	(United Kingdom) Colin McRae	Ret	4	1	Ret	4	1	2	Ret	Ret	Ret	Ret	1	1	1	62
3	(Spain) Carlos Sainz	2	2	Ret	Ret	10	2	Ret	1	2	Ret	1	4	Ret	3	51
4	(Finland) Juha Kankkunen							Ret	2	3	2	2	6	Ret	2	29
5	(Sweden) Kenneth Eriksson		1	Ret	Ret			3	Ret	1	Ret	3		Ret	Ret	28
6	(Italy) Piero Liatti	1				2	5						2		7	24
7	(United Kingdom) Richard Burns			2	Ret			Ret	4	4		4		4	4	21
8	(Germany) Armin Schwarz	4	6	4	3	Ret	9									11
9	(Belgium) Freddy Loix	16			2				Ret		37		5	7		8
10	(France) Gilles Panizzi					3	3									8
11	(France) Didier Auriol	Ret						5			8	Ret	8	3	Ret	6
12	(Finland) Marcus Grönholm		8		Ret			4			Ret				5	5
13	(Kenya) Ian Duncan			3												4
14	(Finland) Jarmo Kytölehto		Ret								3					4
15	(Sweden) Thomas Rådström		5						5							4
16	(New Zealand) Possum Bourne									5				5		4
17	(Belgium) Grégoire De Mévius				4				7				Ret		Ret	3
18	(France) François Delecour					DSQ	4									3
19	(Finland) Sebastian Lindholm										4					3
20	(Germany) Uwe Nittel	5	Ret			8	8		6		7		Ret			3
21	(Kenya) Jonathan Toroitich			5												2
22	(Monaco) Jean-Pierre Richelmi				5				Ret							2
23	(Italy) Angelo Medeghini					5					Ret				10	2
24	(Sweden) Tomas Jansson		7								5					2
25	(Japan) Yoshio Fujimoto											5		Ret		2
26	(Denmark) Henrik Lundgaard	6														1
27	(France) Frédéric Dor			6	17				11	23	29		15			1
28	(Japan) Masao Kamioka				6				Ret						14	1
29	(Portugal) Rui Madeira				15	6										1
30	(France) Philippe Bugalski						6									1
31	(Uruguay) Gustavo Trelles	9	16		7	13		6	13	7	17		Ret			1
32	(Australia) Neal Bates									6		Ret		8		1
33	(Finland) Pasi Hagström										6					1
34	(Malaysia) Karamjit Singh									11		6		Ret	17	1
35	(Australia) Ed Ordynski													6		1
Pos.	Driver	MON (Monaco)	SWE (Sweden)	KEN (Kenya)	POR (Portugal)	ESP (Spain)	FRA (France)	ARG (Argentina)	GRE (Greece)	NZL (New Zealand)	FIN (Finland)	INA (Indonesia)	ITA (Italy)	AUS (Australia)	GBR (United Kingdom)	Pts

Key
Colour	Result
Gold	Winner
Silver	2nd place
Bronze	3rd place
Green	Points finish
Blue	Non-points finish
Blue	Non-classified finish (NC)
Purple	Did not finish (Ret)
Black	Excluded (EX)
Black	Disqualified (DSQ)
White	Did not start (DNS)
White	Cancelled (C)
Blank	Withdrew entry from the event (WD)

=== Manufacturers' championship ===
Pos.	Manufacturer	No.	MON (Monaco)	SWE (Sweden)	KEN (Kenya)	POR (Portugal)	ESP (Spain)	FRA (France)	ARG (Argentina)	GRE (Greece)	NZL (New Zealand)	FIN (Finland)	INA (Indonesia)	ITA (Italy)	AUS (Australia)	GBR (United Kingdom)	Points
1	(Japan) 555 Subaru World Rally Team	3	Ret	4	1	Ret	4	1	2	Ret	Ret	Ret	Ret	1	1	1	114
1	(Japan) 555 Subaru World Rally Team	4	1	1	Ret	Ret	2	5	3	Ret	1	Ret	3	2	Ret	Ret	114
2	(United States) Ford Motor Co	5	2	2	Ret	Ret	10	2	Ret	1	2	Ret	1	4	Ret	3	91
2	(United States) Ford Motor Co	6	4	6	4	3	Ret	9	Ret	2	3	2	2	6	Ret	2	91
3	(Japan) Team Mitsubishi Ralliart	1	3	3	Ret	1	1	Ret	1	3	Ret	1	Ret	3	2	6	86
3	(Japan) Team Mitsubishi Ralliart	2	5	Ret	2	Ret	8	8	Ret	4	4	7	4	Ret	4	4	86
Pos.	Manufacturer	No.	MON (Monaco)	SWE (Sweden)	KEN (Kenya)	POR (Portugal)	ESP (Spain)	FRA (France)	ARG (Argentina)	GRE (Greece)	NZL (New Zealand)	FIN (Finland)	INA (Indonesia)	ITA (Italy)	AUS (Australia)	GBR (United Kingdom)	Points

Key
Colour	Result
Gold	Winner
Silver	2nd place
Bronze	3rd place
Green	Points finish
Blue	Non-points finish
Blue	Non-classified finish (NC)
Purple	Did not finish (Ret)
Black	Excluded (EX)
Black	Disqualified (DSQ)
White	Did not start (DNS)
White	Cancelled (C)
Blank	Withdrew entry from the event (WD)

=== Group N Cup ===
Pos.	Driver	MON (Monaco)	SWE (Sweden)	KEN (Kenya)	POR (Portugal)	ESP (Spain)	FRA (France)	ARG (Argentina)	GRE (Greece)	NZL (New Zealand)	FIN (Finland)	INA (Indonesia)	ITA (Italy)	AUS (Australia)	GBR (United Kingdom)	Pts
1	(Uruguay) Gustavo Trelles	1	4		1	1		1	1	1	4		Ret			84
2	(Spain) Luís Climent				3	Ret	Ret		2		7			Ret	1	26
2	(Austria) Manfred Stohl	3	6		2	5		3			6		4			26
4	(Japan) Shigeyuki Konishi									Ret		2		1		21
4	(Malaysia) Karamjit Singh									3		1		Ret	4	21
6	(Sweden) Kenneth Bäcklund		1													13
6	(Kenya) Johnny Hellier			1												13
6	(France) Jean-Marie Santoni						1									13
6	(Finland) Jouko Puhakka										1					13
6	(Italy) Mario Stagni												1			13
6	(New Zealand) Reece Jones									2				Ret	3	13
12	(Japan) Hideaki Miyoshi									Ret		3		3		10
13	(Germany) Armin Kremer	2														8
13	(Sweden) Stig-Olov Walfridsson		2													8
13	(Poland) Sobiesław Zasada			2												8
13	(Italy) Antonello Fidanza					2										8
13	(France) Jacques Andreani						2									8
13	(Argentina) Roberto Sanchez							2								8
13	(Finland) Olli Harkki										2				Ret	8
13	(Italy) Luca Baldini												2			8
13	(Japan) Yoshihiro Kataoka									Ret		Ret		2		8
13	(United Kingdom) Jeremy Easson														2	8
14	(Finland) Juha Kangas		3								5					7
23	(Kenya) Anwar Azar			3												5
23	(Spain) David Nafría					3										5
23	(Austria) Achim Mörtl						3									5
23	(Greece) Pavlos Moschoutis								3							5
23	(Finland) Marko Ipatti										3					5
23	(Slovenia) Boris Popovič												3			5
Pos.	Driver	MON (Monaco)	SWE (Sweden)	KEN (Kenya)	POR (Portugal)	ESP (Spain)	FRA (France)	ARG (Argentina)	GRE (Greece)	NZL (New Zealand)	FIN (Finland)	INA (Indonesia)	ITA (Italy)	AUS (Australia)	GBR (United Kingdom)	Pts

Key
Colour	Result
Gold	Winner
Silver	2nd place
Bronze	3rd place
Green	Points finish
Blue	Non-points finish
Blue	Non-classified finish (NC)
Purple	Did not finish (Ret)
Black	Excluded (EX)
Black	Disqualified (DSQ)
White	Did not start (DNS)
White	Cancelled (C)
Blank	Withdrew entry from the event (WD)

== Events ==
1997 World Rally Championship event map
Black = Tarmac	Brown = Gravel	Blue = Ice/Snow	Red = Mixed Surface

1997 World Rally Championship schedule and results
Rally Name	Dates Run	Podium Drivers (Finishing Time)	Podium Cars
(Monaco) Monte Carlo Rally	19 January–22 January	1. (Italy) Piero Liatti (4h:26m:58s); 2. (Spain) Carlos Sainz (4h:27m:53s); 3. (Finland) Tommi Mäkinen (4h:29m:29s)	1. Subaru Impreza WRC 97; 2. Ford Escort WRC; 3. Mitsubishi Lancer Evolution IV
(Sweden) Swedish Rally	7 February–10 February	1. (Sweden) Kenneth Eriksson (3h:51m:49s); 2. (Spain) Carlos Sainz (3h:52m:05s); 3. (Finland) Tommi Mäkinen (3h:52m:15s)	1. Subaru Impreza WRC 97; 2. Ford Escort WRC; 3. Mitsubishi Lancer Evolution IV
(Kenya) Safari Rally	1 March–3 March	1. (United Kingdom) Colin McRae (11h:29m:00s); 2. (United Kingdom) Richard Burns (11h:36m:04s); 3. (Kenya) Ian Duncan (11h:40m:18s)	1. Subaru Impreza WRC 97; 2. Mitsubishi Carisma GT Evolution IV; 3. Toyota Celica GT-Four ST205
Rally Portugal	23 March–26 March	1. (Finland) Tommi Mäkinen (4h:53m:01s); 2. (Belgium) Freddy Loix (4h:57m:06s); 3. (Germany) Armin Schwarz (4h:59m:34s)	1. Mitsubishi Lancer Evolution IV; 2. Toyota Celica GT-Four ST205; 3. Ford Escort WRC
(Spain) Rally Catalunya	14 April–16 April	1. (Finland) Tommi Mäkinen (4h:08m:46s); 2. (Italy) Piero Liatti (4h:08m:53s); 3. (France) Gilles Panizzi (4h:11m:55s)	1. Mitsubishi Lancer Evolution IV; 2. Subaru Impreza WRC 97; 3. Peugeot 306 Maxi
(France) Tour de Corse	5 May–7 May	1. (United Kingdom) Colin McRae (4h:31m:08s); 2. (Spain) Carlos Sainz (4h:31m:16s); 3. (France) Gilles Panizzi (4h:31m:46s)	1. Subaru Impreza WRC 97; 2. Ford Escort WRC; 3. Peugeot 306 Maxi
Rally Argentina	22 May–24 May	1. (Finland) Tommi Mäkinen (4h:25m:38s); 2. (United Kingdom) Colin McRae (4h:26m:39s); 3. (Sweden) Kenneth Eriksson (4h:30m:06s)	1. Mitsubishi Lancer Evolution IV; 2. Subaru Impreza WRC 97; 3. Subaru Impreza WRC 97
(Greece) Acropolis Rally	8 June–10 June	1. (Spain) Carlos Sainz (4h:56m:24s); 2. (Finland) Juha Kankkunen (4h:56m:41s); 3. (Finland) Tommi Mäkinen (5h:01m:27s)	1. Ford Escort WRC; 2. Ford Escort WRC; 3. Mitsubishi Lancer Evolution IV
Rally New Zealand	2 August–5 August	1. (Sweden) Kenneth Eriksson (4h:14m:11s); 2. (Spain) Carlos Sainz (4h:14m:24s); 3. (Finland) Juha Kankkunen (4h:14m:30s)	1. Subaru Impreza WRC 97; 2. Ford Escort WRC; 3. Ford Escort WRC
Rally Finland	29 August–31 August	1. (Finland) Tommi Mäkinen (3h:16m:18s); 2. (Finland) Juha Kankkunen (3h:16m:25s); 3. (Finland) Jarmo Kytölehto (3h:18m:18s)	1. Mitsubishi Lancer Evolution IV; 2. Ford Escort WRC; 3. Ford Escort WRC
Rally Indonesia	19 September–21 September	1. (Spain) Carlos Sainz (4h:37m:30s); 2. (Finland) Juha Kankkunen (4h:37m:46s); 3. (Sweden) Kenneth Eriksson (4h:38m:49s)	1. Ford Escort WRC; 2. Ford Escort WRC; 3. Subaru Impreza WRC 97
(Italy) Rally Sanremo	13 October–15 October	1. (United Kingdom) Colin McRae (4h:08m:25s); 2. (Italy) Piero Liatti (4h:08m:31s); 3. (Finland) Tommi Mäkinen (4h:08m:37s)	1. Subaru Impreza WRC 97; 2. Subaru Impreza WRC 97; 3. Mitsubishi Lancer Evolution IV
Rally Australia	30 October–2 November	1. (United Kingdom) Colin McRae (4h:05m:31s); 2. (Finland) Tommi Mäkinen (4h:05m:37s); 3. (France) Didier Auriol (4h:05m:52s)	1. Subaru Impreza WRC 97; 2. Mitsubishi Lancer Evolution IV; 3. Toyota Corolla WRC
(United Kingdom) RAC Rally	23 November–25 November	1. (United Kingdom) Colin McRae (3h:54m:31s); 2. (Finland) Juha Kankkunen (3h:57m:18s); 3. (Spain) Carlos Sainz (3h:58m:24s)	1. Subaru Impreza WRC 97; 2. Ford Escort WRC; 3. Ford Escort WRC
