= Juha Kankkunen =

Finnish rally driver (born 1959)

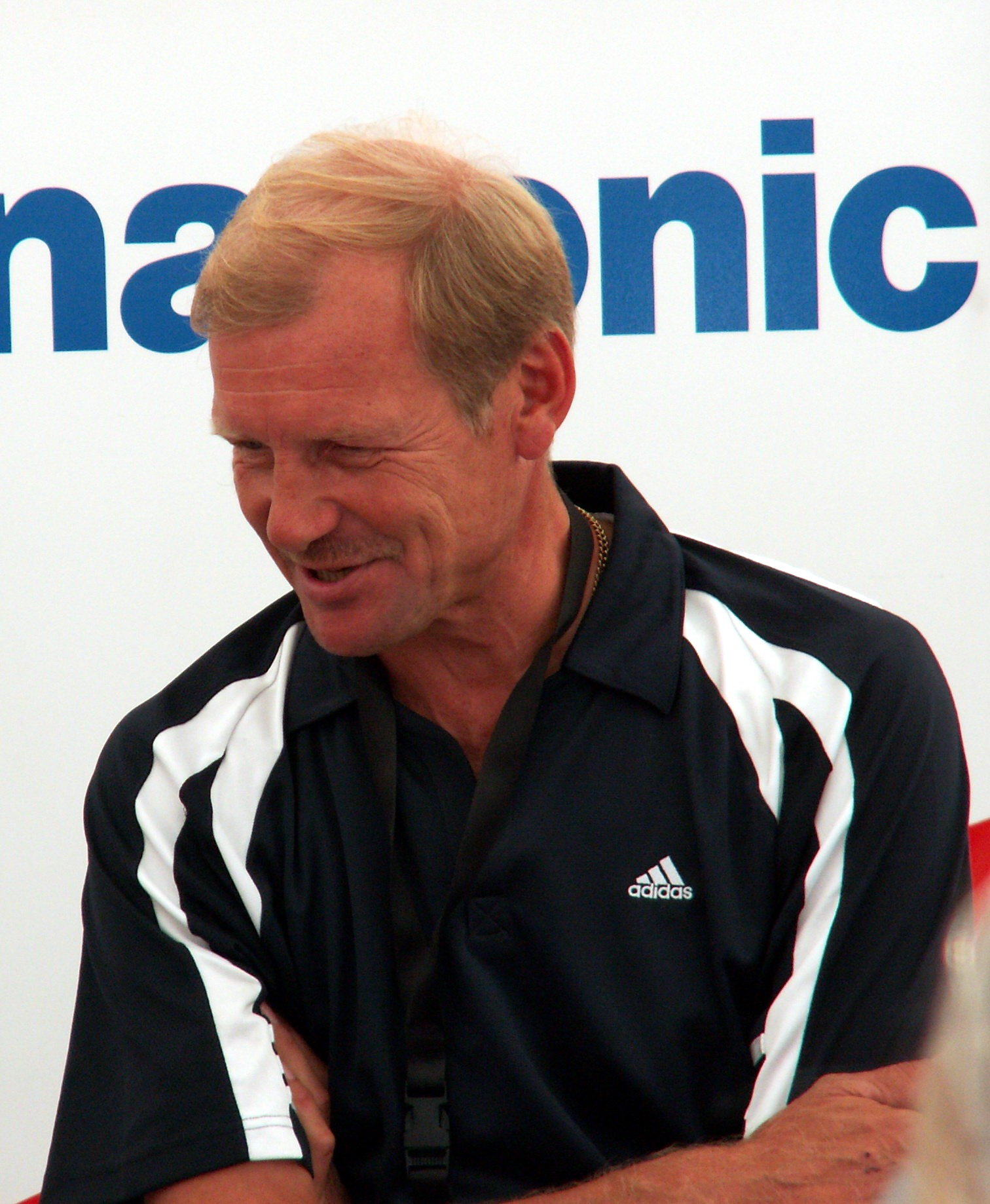
- Kankkunen in Helsinki in 2006

Personal information
- Nationality: (Finland) Finnish
- Full name: Juha Matti Pellervo Kankkunen
- Born: 2 April 1959 (age 67); Laukaa, Finland

World Rally Championship record
- Years active: 1979, 1982–2002, 2010
- Co-driver: (Finland) Timo Hantunen (Finland) Rolf Mesterton (Finland) Staffan Pettersson (United Kingdom) Dave Whittock (Finland) Juha Piironen (United Kingdom) Fred Gallagher (United Kingdom) Nicky Grist (France) Denis Giraudet (Finland) Juha Repo
- Teams: Toyota, Peugeot, Lancia, Ford, Subaru, Hyundai
- Rallies: 162
- Championships: 4 (1986, 1987, 1991, 1993)
- Rally wins: 23
- Podiums: 75
- Stage wins: 700
- Total points: 1140
- First rally: 1979 1000 Lakes Rally
- First win: 1985 Safari Rally
- Last win: 1999 Rally Finland
- Last rally: 2010 Rally Finland

Juha Matti Pellervo Kankkunen (Finnish pronunciation: [ˈjuhɑ ˈkɑŋkːunen]; born 2 April 1959) is a Finnish former rally driver. His factory team career in the World Rally Championship lasted from 1983 to 2002. He won 23 world rallies and four drivers' world championship titles, which were both once records in the series. Both Sébastien Loeb and Sébastien Ogier have since collected more world titles. Kankkunen's feat of becoming a world champion with three different manufacturers was unique until Ogier matched this achievement in 2020.

Kankkunen was signed by Toyota Team Europe in 1983 and he took his first WRC win in his third year in the team. His performances got him a deal with the defending champions Peugeot for 1986, and Kankkunen was soon crowned the series' then youngest-ever champion. As Peugeot withdrew from the championship following the ban of Group B, Kankkunen moved to Lancia and became the first driver to successfully defend his title. After a two-year stint back at Toyota, he returned to Lancia and won a record third title in 1991.

In 1993, Kankkunen re-joined Toyota and won his fourth title. Following Toyota's disqualification and 12-month ban in 1995, Kankkunen did not return to active participation in the series until joining Ford halfway through the 1997 season replacing an underperforming Armin Schwarz. After moving to Subaru for 1999, he took his first win in over five years. Before retiring after the 2002 season, he competed part-time for Hyundai.

Kankkunen's achievements outside the WRC include winning the Dakar Rally in 1988 and the Race of Champions in 1988 and 1991. Following his retirement from active rallying, he has worked in the fields of business and politics. In 2007, Kankkunen set the world speed record on ice in a Bentley Continental GT. In 2011, he set a further record of 330.695 km/h in a convertible Bentley Continental Supersports.

== Career ==
Kankkunen grew up on his family's farm in Laukaa in Central Finland, near the route of the Rally Finland. His father had rallying and ice racing as a hobby, and taught Juha how to drive on an ice racing track. Kankkunen began to drive when he was seven years old, and owned his first car at the age of 12. He debuted in rallying in 1978 and competed in his first World Rally Championship event at the 1979 1000 Lakes Rally in Finland, finishing 14th in a Ford Escort RS2000. Kankkunen was coached by Timo Mäkinen, a friend of his father's, and was able to compete often and gain experience with financial help from Timo Jouhki, future manager for many Finnish rally drivers such as Tommi Mäkinen and Mikko Hirvonen.

=== 1983–85: Toyota ===
Due to good results for Toyota Finland in local events, Kankkunen was signed by the Toyota Team Europe, Toyota's factory WRC team headed by Ove Andersson. In his first season in the Toyota Celica Twincam Turbo, as teammate to the 1979 world champion Björn Waldegård, his three outings in the championship resulted in a sixth place at the 1000 Lakes, a seventh place at the RAC Rally in Great Britain and a retirement at the Rallye Côte d'Ivoire. The following year, Kankkunen competed in four WRC events with Fred Gallagher as his new regular co-driver, retiring in three and finishing fifth in his home event. In 1985, he started his season with a surprise victory at the Safari Rally, becoming the first driver to win the event on the first attempt. He went on to compete in four more rallies and take his second win at WRC's second endurance event, the Rallye Côte d'Ivoire, where he finished with the same amount of penalty minutes (4 hours and 46 minutes) as his teammate Waldegård but took the win by a tiebreaker.

=== 1986: Peugeot ===
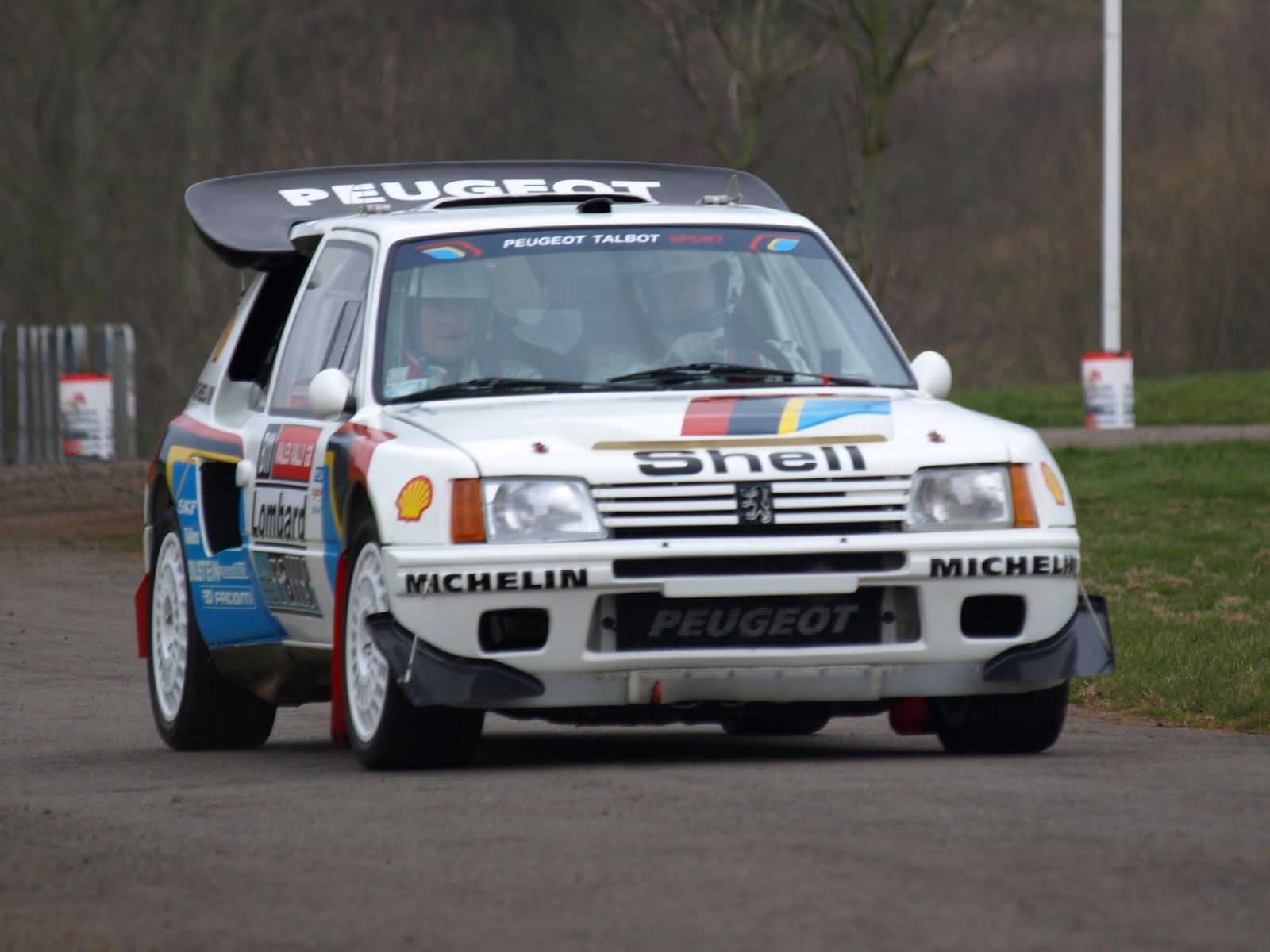
Peugeot 205 Turbo 16 E2 at the Race Retro 2008.

Kankkunen's performances with the Celica earned him his chance to come to the fore with the defending manufacturers' and drivers' champions Peugeot. The team signed him for the 1986 season to replace Ari Vatanen who was still recovering from his nearly fatal accident during the previous season. Kankkunen duly seized his opportunity, taking the second evolution of the Peugeot 205 Turbo 16 E2 to victory in the Swedish Rally, the Acropolis Rally and the Rally New Zealand and finishing on the podium in three more events. The season ended in controversy, when first Group B cars were banned for the next season after Henri Toivonen's fatal accident at the Tour de Corse, which outraged Peugeot team principal Jean Todt, and later the French Peugeot team were excluded at the Rallye Sanremo in Italy, resulting in a triple win for home country's Lancia. Despite the 205 T16s passing the pre-rally scrutiny, the stewards had decreed on re-examination that the cars' underbody fins were in fact illegal side skirts. Going into the season-ending Olympus Rally in the United States, Lancia's Markku Alén led Kankkunen by one point. Although Alén beat Kankkunen to the win, he was the world champion only for eleven days, until Peugeot's appeal went through. The FIA deemed the team's Sanremo exclusion illegal and annulled the results of the event, making Kankkunen the youngest champion in the history of the series.

=== 1987: Lancia ===
Following the FIA's decision to ban Group B, Peugeot withdrew from the WRC and Kankkunen moved to drive the Lancia Delta HF 4WD for Lancia Martini, Lancia's factory WRC team. He was quickly comfortable in the car and led his Lancia debut in Monte Carlo until the very last stage, when Lancia boss Cesare Fiorio controversially forced him to finish second behind teammate Miki Biasion. Kankkunen later won the Olympus Rally by beating Biasion by only 12 seconds in a six-hour event. In a close battle for the drivers' world championship title, he edged out his teammates Biasion and Alén by winning the season-ending RAC Rally. At the Autosport Awards, Kankkunen was presented the "International Rally Driver Award" for the second year running. Despite becoming the first driver to successfully defend the world title, Kankkunen's uneasy acceptance of team orders designed to benefit Biasion, the Italian star in an Italian car, pre-empted a move elsewhere for the 1988 season.

=== 1988–89: Toyota ===
Kankkunen chose to move back to Toyota Team Europe. Although he finished fifth in his first event with the Toyota Supra Turbo at the Safari Rally, his title defense quickly proved unsuccessful. Toyota debuted the new Toyota Celica GT-Four ST165 at the Tour de Corse, but the car was suffering from reliability issues. Kankkunen retired due to engine problems in three consecutive rallies and did not add to his points tally, finishing only 37th in the drivers' standings.

However, outside the World Rally Championship, Kankkunen achieved much success. Returning to the wheel of a Peugeot 205 T16, he won the Dakar Rally on his first attempt after compatriot and teammate Ari Vatanen's 405 T16 was famously stolen while he was leading the event. Kankkunen also competed for Peugeot at the Pikes Peak International Hillclimb, finishing runner-up to again-teammate Vatanen, and at the first-ever Race of Champions, beating the 1985 world rally champion and former Peugeot teammate Timo Salonen in the final to become the first "Champion of Champions".

The 1989 season saw an improved Toyota. Kankkunen gave the GT-Four its first victory in the Rally Australia and finished third at the Tour de Corse and at the RAC. His results placed him third in the drivers' championship, behind Lancia drivers Biasion and Alex Fiorio. Toyota took career-best second place in the manufacturers' standings.

=== 1990–92: Lancia ===
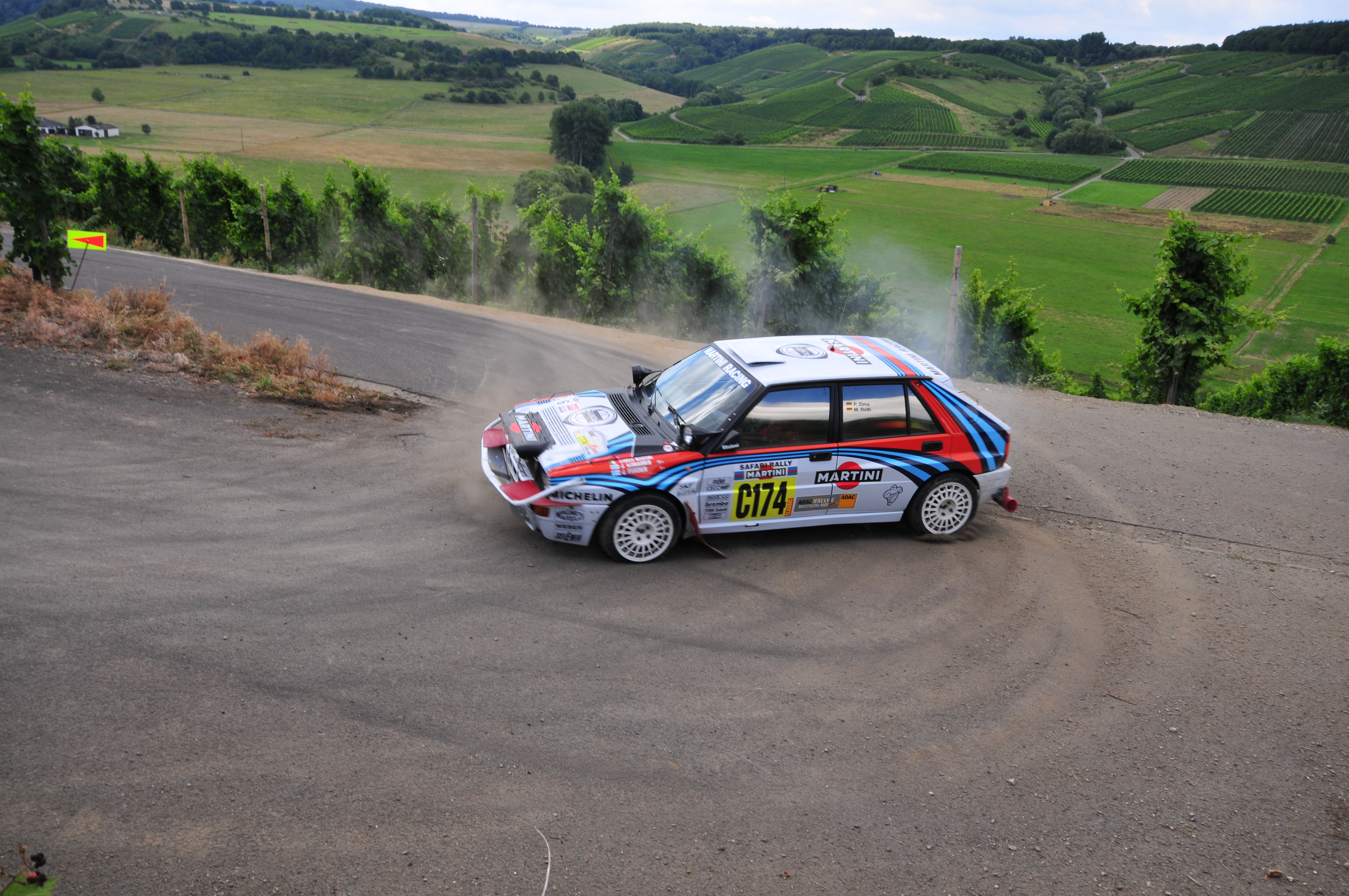
Kankkunen's 1992 Safari Rally Lancia Delta HF Integrale driven non-competitively during the 2008 Rallye Deutschland.

By the time Kankkunen took the long-awaited win for Toyota, he had already signed a deal to reacquaint himself with Lancia for the 1990 season. Halfway through the season, Kankkunen found himself only fourth in the championship and Toyota in the lead with their new star driver Carlos Sainz. Although Kankkunen later repeated his win in Australia and collected his fifth podium of the season in Sanremo, Sainz went on to take a dominant title. Kankkunen placed third in the drivers' world championship, between his teammates Didier Auriol and the defending world champion Biasion. Lancia edged out Toyota to take a record fourth manufacturers' title in a row.

In the 1991 season, Kankkunen won the Safari Rally, the Acropolis Rally, his home event 1000 Lakes Rally for the first time and the Rally Australia for the third year in a row. Before the season-ending RAC Rally, Toyota's Sainz led Kankkunen by one point in the championship. By winning the RAC ahead of Kenneth Eriksson and Sainz, Kankkunen became the first man to seal a third drivers' title since the World Rally Championship's 1973 inauguration. His 150 points during the season is still the record for most points in a single season. This was also the first time that two drivers took five wins during a WRC season. In the Race of Champions, Kankkunen became the second two-time winner after beating Auriol in the final.

In 1992, Kankkunen placed on the podium in each of the nine WRC events that he participated in, but took his only win at the Rally Portugal. The title fight again went down to the wire. Before the final rally, Sainz led Kankkunen by two points and Auriol, who had taken a record six wins during the season, by three points. Sainz's victory in the RAC ahead of Ari Vatanen and Kankkunen, combined with Auriol's retirement, confirmed the title in favour of the Spaniard.

=== 1993–96: Toyota ===
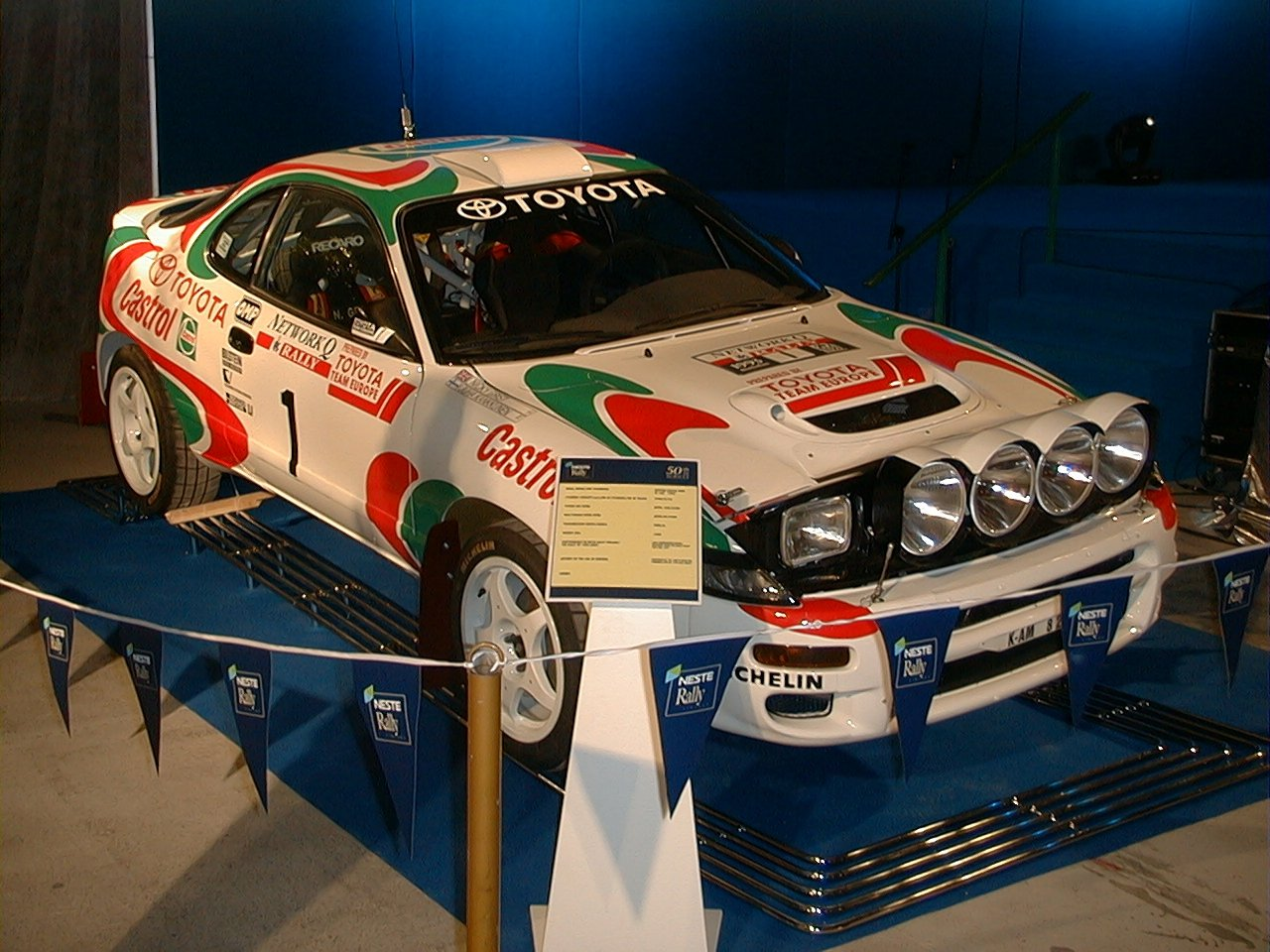
Kankkunen's winning 1993 RAC Rally Toyota Celica GT-Four ST185.

After Lancia withdrew from the WRC after the 1992 season, Kankkunen rejoined Toyota to drive the Toyota Celica GT-Four ST185 with which Sainz had defeated him last year. Despite having to fare from mid-season with two substitute co-drivers after Juha Piironen suffered a brain hemorrhage, Kankkunen went on to take a record fourth drivers' title by winning five of his ten WRC events; the Safari Rally with Piironen, the Rally Argentina, the Rally Australia and the RAC Rally with his new co-driver Nicky Grist, and the 1000 Lakes Rally with Denis Giraudet due to Grist's pre-arrangement with Armin Schwarz. Kankkunen's win at the RAC marked his career 20th in the series, breaking compatriot Markku Alén's record for most wins. Kankkunen and his third-placed teammate Didier Auriol brought Toyota the manufacturers' crown, the first for a Japanese manufacturer. He also became only the second motorsportsman to be voted the Finnish Sportsman of the Year, after the 1982 F1 world champion Keke Rosberg.

In 1994, Kankkunen started well with a runner-up spot in Monte Carlo and a win in Portugal. In the Safari Rally, he crashed out from the lead after hitting a pothole made by rain at 180 km/h (112 mph). At the season's half-way point, Kankkunen and Subaru's Sainz tied the lead in the championship, but a few poor results soon dropped him out of the title fight; in Argentina and Sanremo, he suffered from mechanical problems and in Finland, he won the opening stage but lost 20 minutes on stage two after rolling his car. He climbed back into the points by finishing ninth. Finishing behind Auriol and Sainz in the overall standings, Kankkunen had to watch a teammate take the title for the only time in his career.

In 1995, with two more rallies to go, Kankkunen's consistent performances during the season had kept him in the lead of the championship seven points ahead of Subaru's Colin McRae. At the penultimate round, the Rally Catalunya, he was leading by almost a minute over Sainz and McRae and seemed to be heading towards his first WRC victory on tarmac, as well as closing in on his fifth title. However, a pacenote mistake by either him or his co-driver Grist resulted in a crash and a retirement. After the event, Toyota were found guilty of the implementation of illegal turbo restrictor bypasses on their ST205 cars. The team was given a 12-month ban by the FIA. Toyota drivers Kankkunen, Auriol and Armin Schwarz were also stripped of all points in the championships. FIA president Max Mosley stated that "there is no suggestion the drivers were aware of what was going on." In the following year (1996 which also happened to be the end of Nicky Grist's pairing with Kankkunen as a favor to replace Colin McRae's co-driver Derek Ringer from 1997 to 2002), Kankkunen competed for private Toyota teams in three events and finished fourth in Sweden, third in Indonesia and second in Finland.

=== 1997–98: Ford ===
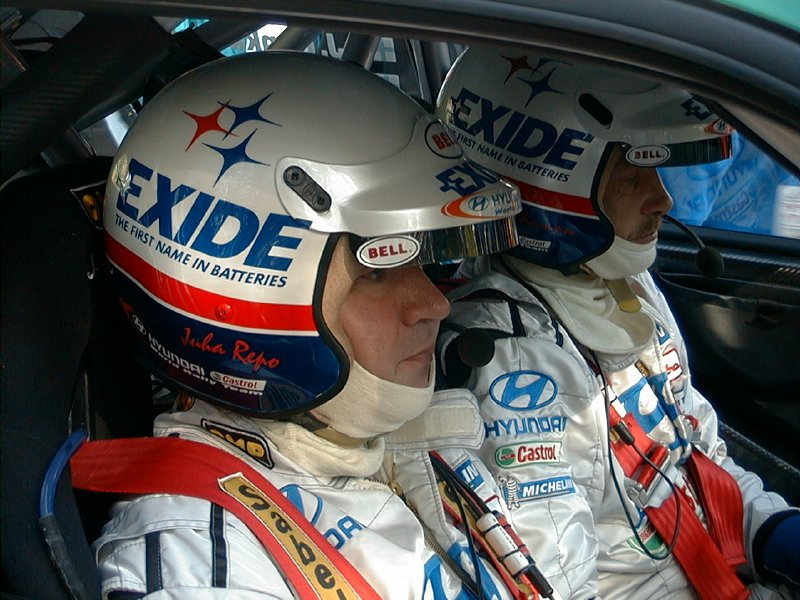
Kankkunen with his 1997–2002 co-driver Juha Repo.

Halfway through the 1997 season, Kankkunen joined the Ford Motor Company factory team to replace a disappointing Armin Schwarz. Joining the M-Sport-run team too late to challenge for the title himself, Kankkunen's role was to support Ford and his teammate Carlos Sainz in their title fights. He started well by leading his second event with the team, the Acropolis Rally in Greece, until having to drop behind Sainz due to a team order. Kankkunen went on to finish only seconds behind Sainz also in Indonesia and New Zealand. In his home rally in Finland, he lost the win to the defending world champion, Mitsubishi's Tommi Mäkinen, by only seven seconds. This is still the narrowest winning margin in the history of the event. A fourth runner-up spot followed in the season-ending RAC Rally, now ahead of the Spaniard who had by then lost the title to Mäkinen.

Kankkunen stayed with Ford for the 1998 season with Belgian driver Bruno Thiry as his new teammate, after Sainz had opted to re-join Toyota. Ford was already moving resources into developing the new Ford Focus WRC and the team's last year with the Escort WRC was winless. Kankkunen drove the car on the podium on seven occasions, and both Ford and Kankkunen finished fourth in their respective championships. For the 1999 season, Ford signed the Subaru World Rally Team star Colin McRae and Kankkunen moved to replace him at Subaru.

=== 1999–2000: Subaru ===
Kankkunen's first year with the Subaru World Rally Team and the Subaru Impreza WRC led to victories in Argentina and Finland. In Argentina, he took his first win in over five years, overtaking teammate Richard Burns on the last stage to win by a mere 2.4 seconds. Kankkunen was prepared to accept a team order in the form of a deliberate ten-second time penalty, but with the TV cameras filming, Subaru team principal David Richards stated that there would be no team orders. In his home event, Kankkunen beat Burns to what would be his final victory in the WRC. Despite a one-two for Subaru again at the season-ending RAC, Subaru lost the manufacturers' crown to Toyota by four points. For the third year in a row, Kankkunen placed fourth in the drivers' championship, while Mäkinen equalled Kankkunen's record of four titles. Kankkunen's 2000 season was a disappointment. His best result was second in the Safari Rally behind Burns. With only two other podium finishes to his name, Kankkunen placed eighth in the drivers' standings.

=== Later career ===
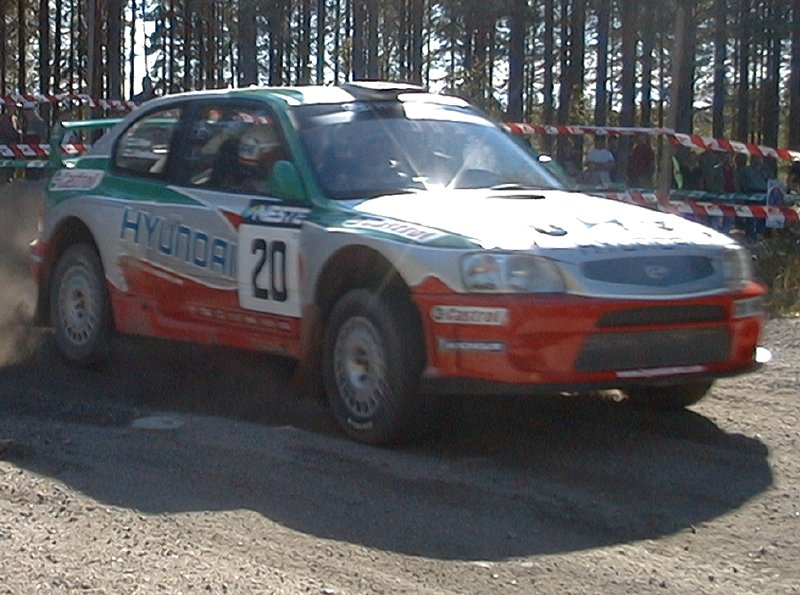
Kankkunen with an Accent WRC at the 2001 Rally Finland.

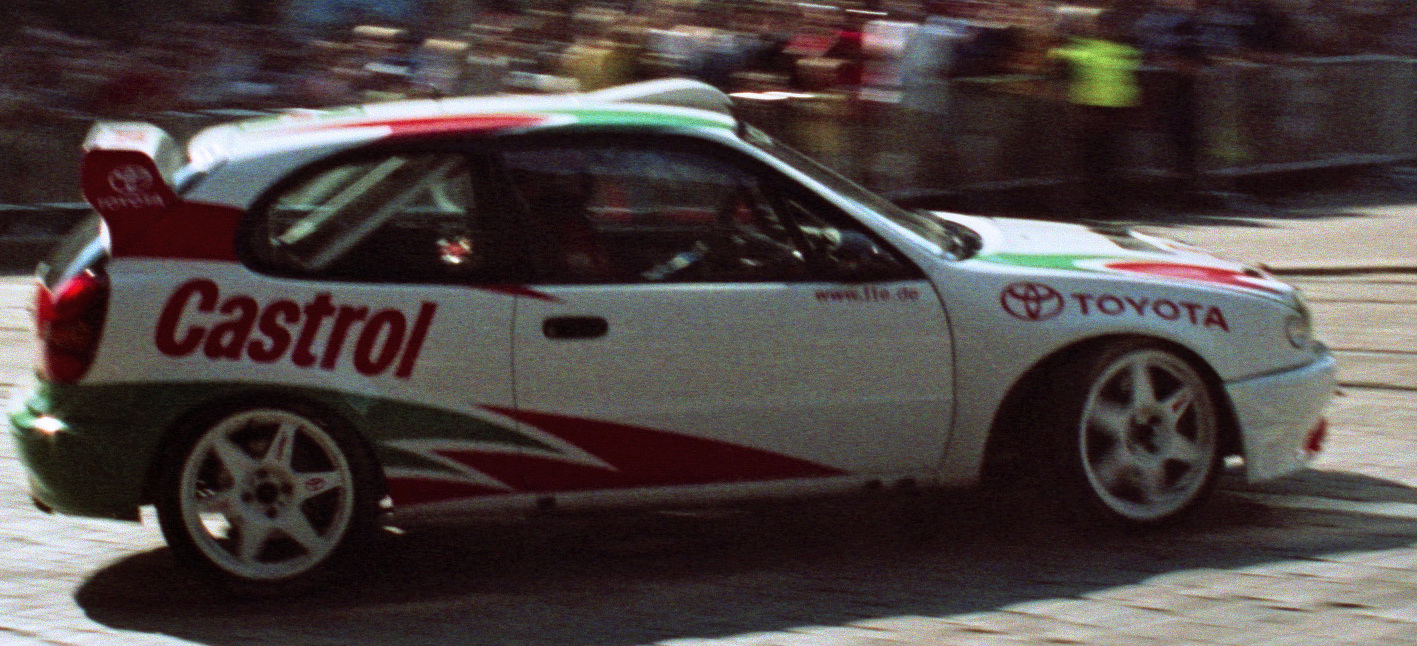
Juha Kankkunen doing a show run for the Helsinki City Grand Prix in 2006

Subaru and Kankkunen did not reach a deal for 2001, and Kankkunen ended up competing in only one world rally during the season, the Rally Finland for the Hyundai factory team. He retired after his Accent WRC incurred several technical problems. For the 2002 season, Hyundai initially offered Kankkunen a full 14-event programme, which did not interest him, and the deal was modified to include only the nine gravel rallies. Despite a new evolution of the Accent WRC, Hyundai were unable to challenge the top teams: Peugeot, Ford and Subaru. Kankkunen's fifth place in the Rally New Zealand was the team's best result of the season. However, Kankkunen and the team's full-time drivers Freddy Loix and Armin Schwarz did narrowly give Hyundai its career-best fourth place in the manufacturers' world championship. Kankkunen retired from the WRC after the season.

Following his retirement, Kankkunen announced his intention to enter politics, echoing the career path of rallying compatriot Ari Vatanen. In 2004, he ran for the European Parliament as a candidate of the conservative National Coalition Party. While Vatanen was re-elected, Kankkunen's 17,815 votes were not enough to gain a seat. Kankkunen, a "Flying Finn" himself, was one of the shareholders in the now-bankrupt Flying Finn airline, the first low cost airline in Finland. The company's first airplane was named after him. Kankkunen, along with former NHL star Jari Kurri, has also been a shareholder in a company that builds luxury real estate in Ruka, Finland.

In 2004, Kankkunen signed with the works Volkswagen rally raid team and competed with them on the 2005 Dakar Rally. Following a roll, another competitor crashed into the stranded Touareg. Kankkunen was withdrawn from the event after the tenth stage.

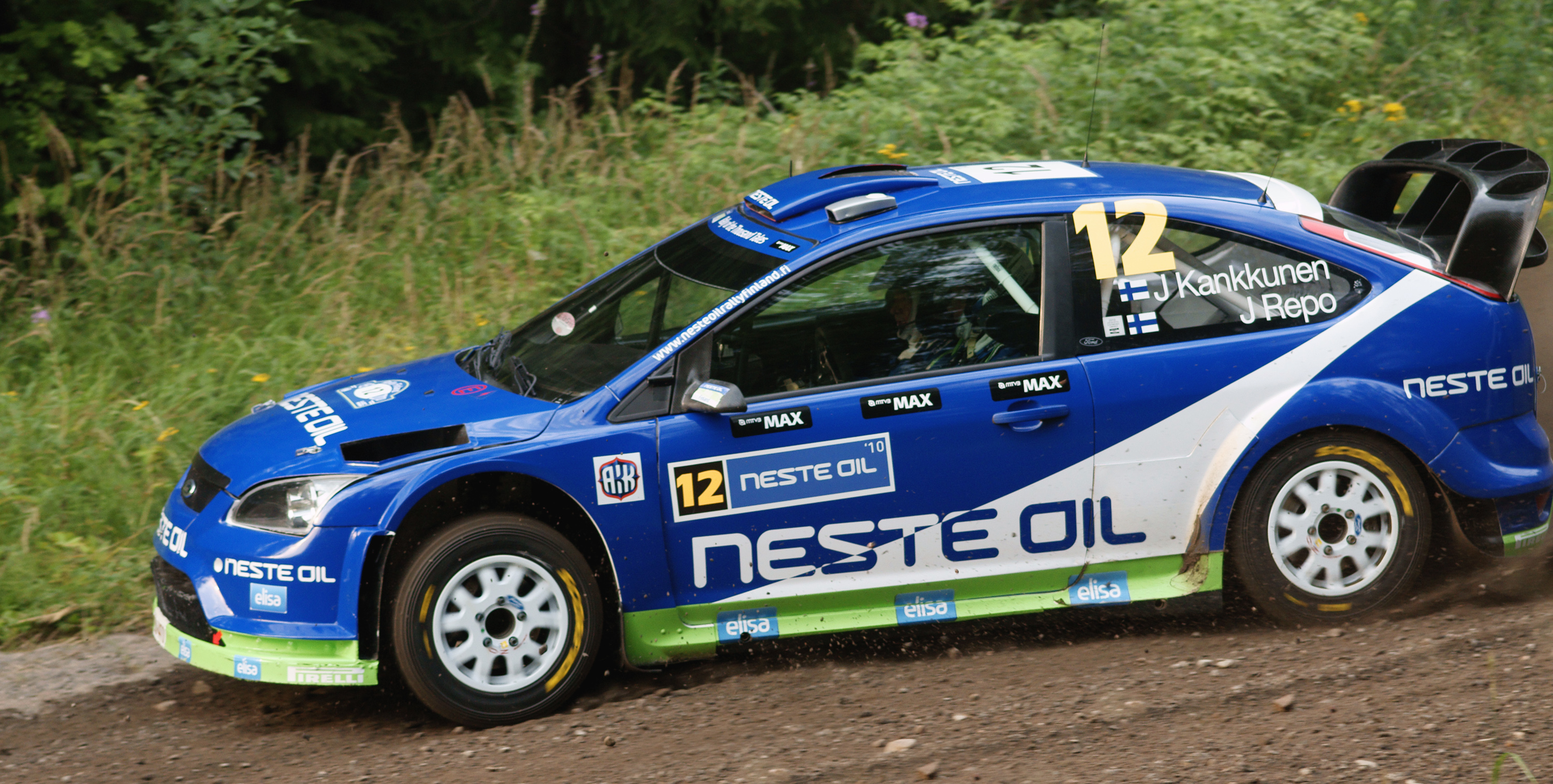
Kankkunen on the Laajavuori stage of the 2010 Rally Finland.

In early 2007, Kankkunen set a new world speed record on ice in his privately owned Bentley Continental GT on the frozen Gulf of Bothnia near Oulu, Finland. He averaged 321.65 km/h (199.86 mph) in both directions on the "flying kilometer", reaching a maximum speed of 331 km/h (206 mph). Previously the record was 296.34 km/h (184 mph) held by a Bugatti EB110 Supersport. The Bentley was largely standard except a rollcage, some aerodynamic improvements and low-temperature fuel and calibration. Tires were from Nokian Tyres with spikes. Technical support was provided by Nokian and Bentley Motors. Kankkunen bettered the record to 330.695 km/h (205.48 mph) in 2011, driving an E85-powered Bentley Continental Supersports convertible. Bentley will release a limited edition of the Supersports to celebrate the achievement. The 100 models will be the most powerful road cars Bentley has ever produced.

It was announced on 23 July 2010 that Kankkunen would take part in the 2010 Rally Finland to mark the sixtieth jubilee of the event. He was joined by his long-time co-driver Juha Repo driving a Ford Focus RS WRC 08 for the Stobart M-Sport Ford Rally Team. At just over 51 years old, Kankkunen finished an impressive 8th, beating many WRC regulars.

Since the 2025 season, Kankkunen has served as team manager of Toyota Gazoo Racing WRT in the World Rally Championship. In the same season, Kankkunen become first who has been won car manufacturer championship as a driver and team manager for the same car manufacturer.

== Personal life ==
Kankkunen currently lives in Monaco but also spends time on his family farm in Laukaa, which includes a large country house and hundreds of hectares of land. He has a large car collection, which includes six Ferraris such as the F40 and the 288 GTO, as well as all the four rally cars with which he won the world championship. Kankkunen and his wife Pirjo filed for divorce in 2008. They have two sons named Tino and Niko. Juha's father Pekka and his brother Timo were also former rally drivers.

== WRC victories ==
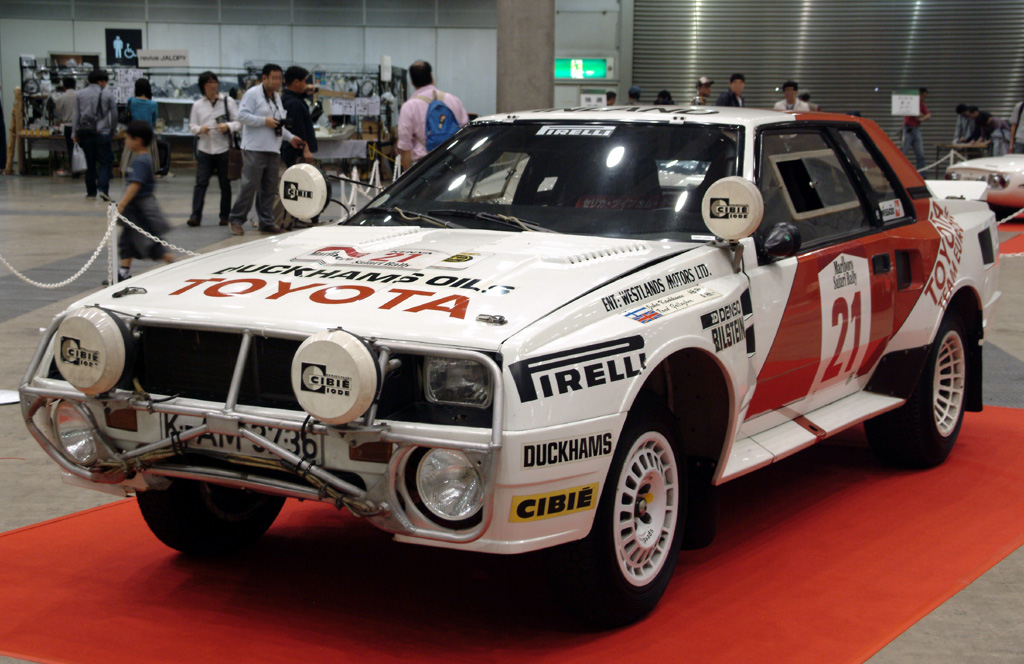
Juha Kankkunen's 1985 Toyota Celica TwinCam Turbo (TA64) Group B rally car

Number	Event	Season	Co-driver	Car
1	(Kenya) Safari Rally	1985	Fred Gallagher	Toyota Celica TCT
2	(Ivory Coast) Rallye Côte d'Ivoire	1985	Fred Gallagher	Toyota Celica TCT
3	(Sweden) Swedish Rally	1986	Juha Piironen	Peugeot 205 Turbo 16 E2
4	(Greece) Acropolis Rally	1986	Juha Piironen	Peugeot 205 Turbo 16 E2
5	Rally New Zealand	1986	Juha Piironen	Peugeot 205 Turbo 16 E2
6	(United States) Olympus Rally	1987	Juha Piironen	Lancia Delta HF 4WD
7	(United Kingdom) RAC Rally	1987	Juha Piironen	Lancia Delta HF 4WD
8	Rally Australia	1989	Juha Piironen	Toyota Celica GT-Four ST165
9	Rally Australia	1990	Juha Piironen	Lancia Delta Integrale 16V
10	(Kenya) Safari Rally	1991	Juha Piironen	Lancia Delta Integrale 16V
11	(Greece) Acropolis Rally	1991	Juha Piironen	Lancia Delta Integrale 16V
12	Rally Finland	1991	Juha Piironen	Lancia Delta Integrale 16V
13	Rally Australia	1991	Juha Piironen	Lancia Delta Integrale 16V
14	(United Kingdom) RAC Rally	1991	Juha Piironen	Lancia Delta Integrale 16V
15	Rally de Portugal	1992	Juha Piironen	Lancia Delta HF Integrale
16	(Kenya) Safari Rally	1993	Juha Piironen	Toyota Celica Turbo 4WD
17	Rally Argentina	1993	Nicky Grist	Toyota Celica Turbo 4WD
18	(Finland) 1000 Lakes Rally	1993	Denis Giraudet	Toyota Celica Turbo 4WD
19	Rally Australia	1993	Nicky Grist	Toyota Celica Turbo 4WD
20	(United Kingdom) RAC Rally	1993	Nicky Grist	Toyota Celica Turbo 4WD
21	Rallye de Portugal	1994	Nicky Grist	Toyota Celica Turbo 4WD
22	Rally Argentina	1999	Juha Repo	Subaru Impreza WRC 99
23	Rally Finland	1999	Juha Repo	Subaru Impreza WRC 99

== Complete WRC results ==
Year	Entrant	Car	1	2	3	4	5	6	7	8	9	10	11	12	13	14	WDC	Points
1979	Juha Kankkunen	Ford Escort RS2000	MON	SWE	POR	KEN	GRC	NZL	FIN; 14	CAN	ITA	FRA	GBR	CIV			–	0
1982	Juha Kankkunen	Opel Manta GT/E	MON	SWE	POR	KEN	FRA	GRC	NZL	BRA	FIN; Ret	ITA	CIV				–	0
1982	Intereconomics	Opel Manta GT/E												GBR; Ret			–	0
1983	Toyota Team Europe	Toyota Celica TCT	MON	SWE	POR	KEN	FRA	GRC	NZL	ARG	FIN; 6	ITA					19th	10
1983	Premoto Toyota	Toyota Celica TCT											CIV; Ret				19th	10
1983	Toyota Team Great Britain	Toyota Celica TCT												GBR; 7			19th	10
1984	Toyota Team Europe	Toyota Celica TCT	MON	SWE	POR; Ret	KEN	FRA	GRC		ARG	FIN; 5	ITA	CIV				24th	8
1984	Toyota New Zealand	Toyota Celica TCT							NZL; Ret								24th	8
1984	Toyota Team Great Britain	Toyota Celica TCT												GBR; Ret			24th	8
1985	Westland Motors	Toyota Celica TCT	MON	SWE	POR	KEN; 1	FRA	GRC									5th	48
1985	Toyota New Zealand	Toyota Celica TCT							NZL; Ret	ARG							5th	48
1985	Toyota Team Europe	Toyota Celica TCT									FIN; Ret	ITA		GBR; 5			5th	48
1985	Premoto Toyota	Toyota Celica TCT											CIV; 1				5th	48
1986	Peugeot Talbot Sport	Peugeot 205 Turbo 16 E2	MON; 5	SWE; 1	POR; Ret	KEN; 5	FRA	GRC; 1	NZL; 1	ARG; Ret	FIN; 2	CIV	ITA; Ret	GBR; 3	USA; 2		1st	118
1987	Martini Lancia	Lancia Delta HF 4WD	MON; 2	SWE; 3	POR; 4	KEN	FRA	GRC; 2	USA; 1	NZL	ARG	FIN; 5	CIV	ITA	GBR; 1		1st	100
1988	Toyota Team Europe	Toyota Supra Turbo	MON	SWE	POR	KEN; 5											37th	8
1988	Toyota Team Europe	Toyota Celica GT-Four ST165					FRA; Ret	GRC; Ret	USA	NZL	ARG	FIN; Ret	CIV	ITA; Ret	GBR; Ret		37th	8
1989	Toyota Team Europe	Toyota Celica GT-Four ST165	SWE	MON; 5	POR; Ret	KEN	FRA; 3	GRC; Ret	NZL	ARG	FIN; Ret	AUS; 1	ITA; 5	CIV	GBR; 3		3rd	60
1990	Martini Lancia	Lancia Delta Integrale 16V	MON; Ret	POR; 3	KEN; 2	FRA	GRC; 2	NZL	ARG; Ret	FIN; 5	AUS; 1	ITA; 2	CIV	GBR; Ret			3rd	85
1991	Martini Lancia	Lancia Delta Integrale 16V	MON; 5	SWE	POR; 4	KEN; 1	FRA	GRC; 1	NZL; 2	ARG; 4	FIN; 1	AUS; 1	ITA; Ret	CIV	ESP; 2	GBR; 1	1st	150
1992	Martini Racing	Lancia Delta HF Integrale	MON; 3	SWE	POR; 1	KEN; 2	FRA	GRC; 2	NZL	ARG	FIN; 2	AUS; 2	ITA; 2	CIV	ESP; 2	GBR; 3	2nd	134
1993	Toyota Castrol Team	Toyota Celica Turbo 4WD	MON; 5	SWE; 2	POR	KEN; 1	FRA	GRC; Ret	ARG; 1	NZL; 5	FIN; 1	AUS; 1	ITA	ESP; 3	GBR; 1		1st	135
1994	Toyota Castrol Team	Toyota Celica Turbo 4WD	MON; 2	POR; 1	KEN; Ret	FRA; 4	GRC; 3	ARG; Ret	NZL; 2	FIN; 9							3rd	93
1994	Toyota Castrol Team	Toyota Celica GT-Four ST205									ITA; 7	GBR; 2					3rd	93
1995	Toyota Castrol Team	Toyota Celica GT-Four ST205	MON; 3	SWE; 4	POR; 2	FRA; 10	NZL; 3	AUS; 3	ESP; Ret	GBR							DSQ	62
1996	Toyota Castrol Team Sweden	Toyota Celica GT-Four ST205	SWE; 4	KEN													7th	37
1996	Toyota Team Australia	Toyota Celica GT-Four ST205			IDN; 3	GRC	ARG										7th	37
1996	Team Toyota Castrol Finland	Toyota Celica GT-Four ST205						FIN; 2	AUS	ITA	ESP						7th	37
1997	Ford Motor Co	Ford Escort WRC	MON	SWE	KEN	POR	ESP	FRA	ARG; Ret	GRC; 2	NZL; 3	FIN; 2	IDN; 2	ITA; 6	AUS; Ret	GBR; 2	4th	29
1998	Ford Motor Co	Ford Escort WRC	MON; 2	SWE; 3	KEN; 2	POR; 7	ESP; Ret	FRA; 9	ARG; 3	GRC; 3	NZL; 4	FIN; 3	ITA; Ret	AUS; 5	GBR; 2		4th	39
1999	Subaru World Rally Team	Subaru Impreza WRC99	MON; 2	SWE; 6	KEN; Ret	POR; Ret	ESP; 6	FRA	ARG; 1	GRC; Ret	NZL; 2	FIN; 1	CHN; 4	ITA; 6	AUS; Ret	GBR; 2	4th	44
2000	Subaru World Rally Team	Subaru Impreza WRC99	MON; 3	SWE; 6	KEN; 2												8th	20
2000	Subaru World Rally Team	Subaru Impreza WRC2000				POR; Ret	ESP; Ret	ARG; 4	GRC; 3	NZL; Ret	FIN; 8	CYP; 7	FRA	ITA	AUS; Ret	GBR; 5	8th	20
2001	Hyundai Castrol WRT	Hyundai Accent WRC2	MON	SWE	POR	ESP	ARG	CYP	GRC	KEN	FIN; Ret	NZL	ITA	FRA	AUS	GBR	–	0
2002	Hyundai Castrol WRT	Hyundai Accent WRC2	MON	SWE; 8	FRA	ESP											14th	2
2002	Hyundai Castrol WRT	Hyundai Accent WRC3					CYP; Ret	ARG; 7	GRC; Ret	KEN; 8	FIN; Ret	GER	ITA	NZL; 5	AUS; Ret	GBR; 9	14th	2
2010	Stobart M-Sport Ford Rally Team	Ford Focus RS WRC 08	SWE	MEX	JOR	TUR	NZL	POR	BUL	FIN; 8	GER	JPN	FRA	ESP	GBR		16th	4

Awards and achievements
Preceded by Timo Salonen	Autosport; International Rally Driver Award; 1986–1987	Succeeded by Markku Alén
Preceded by Didier Auriol	Autosport; International Rally Driver Award; 1993	Succeeded by Colin McRae
Sporting positions
Preceded by Timo Salonen	World Rally Champion; 1986–1987	Succeeded by Miki Biasion
Preceded by Ari Vatanen	Dakar Rally; Cars Winner; 1988	Succeeded by Ari Vatanen
Preceded by Inaugural event	Race of Champions; Champion of Champions; 1988	Succeeded by Stig Blomqvist
Preceded by Carlos Sainz	World Rally Champion; 1991	Succeeded by Carlos Sainz
Preceded by Stig Blomqvist	Race of Champions; Champion of Champions; 1991	Succeeded by Andrea Aghini
Preceded by Carlos Sainz	World Rally Champion; 1993	Succeeded by Didier Auriol
Records
Preceded by Ari Vatanen; 29 years, 212 days (1981 season)	Youngest World Rally Champion; 27 years, 249 days (1986 season)	Succeeded by Colin McRae; 27 years, 109 days (1995 season)
Preceded by ??? ??? starts	Most rally starts 153 starts, (1979, 1982–2002, 2010)	Succeeded by Carlos Sainz; 196 starts, 154th at the 2002 Tour de Corse
Preceded by Markku Alén; 19 wins (1973–1993, 2001)	Most rally wins 23 wins, 20th at the 1993 RAC Rally	Succeeded by Tommi Mäkinen; 24 wins, 24th at the 2002 Monte Carlo Rally
