= Armin Schwarz =

German rally driver (born 1963)

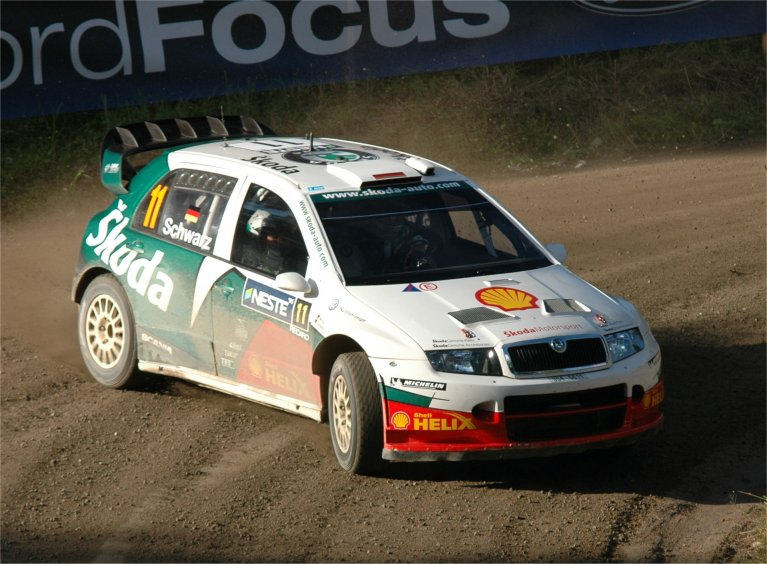
- Schwarz at the 2005 Rally Finland

Personal information
- Nationality: (Germany) German
- Born: 16 July 1963 (age 63); Neustadt an der Aisch, West Germany

World Rally Championship record
- Years active: 1988–2005
- Co-driver: (Sweden) Arne Hertz (Germany) Klaus Wicha (United Kingdom) Nicky Grist (Germany) Peter Thul (France) Denis Giraudet (United Kingdom) Phil Mills (Germany) Manfred Hiemer
- Teams: Toyota, Mitsubishi, Ford, Škoda, Hyundai
- Rallies: 119
- Championships: 0
- Rally wins: 1
- Podiums: 7
- Stage wins: 100
- Total points: 179
- First rally: 1988 RAC Rally
- First win: 1991 Rally Catalunya
- Last rally: 2005 Rally Australia

Armin Schwarz (born 16 July 1963) is a German rally driver. He competed in the World Rally Championship from 1988 to 2005, winning the 1991 Rally Catalunya and taking six other podium finishes. Outside the WRC, he won the German Rally Championship (1987–88), the European Rally Championship (1996) and the "Rally Masters" event at the Race of Champions (2000).

== Career ==
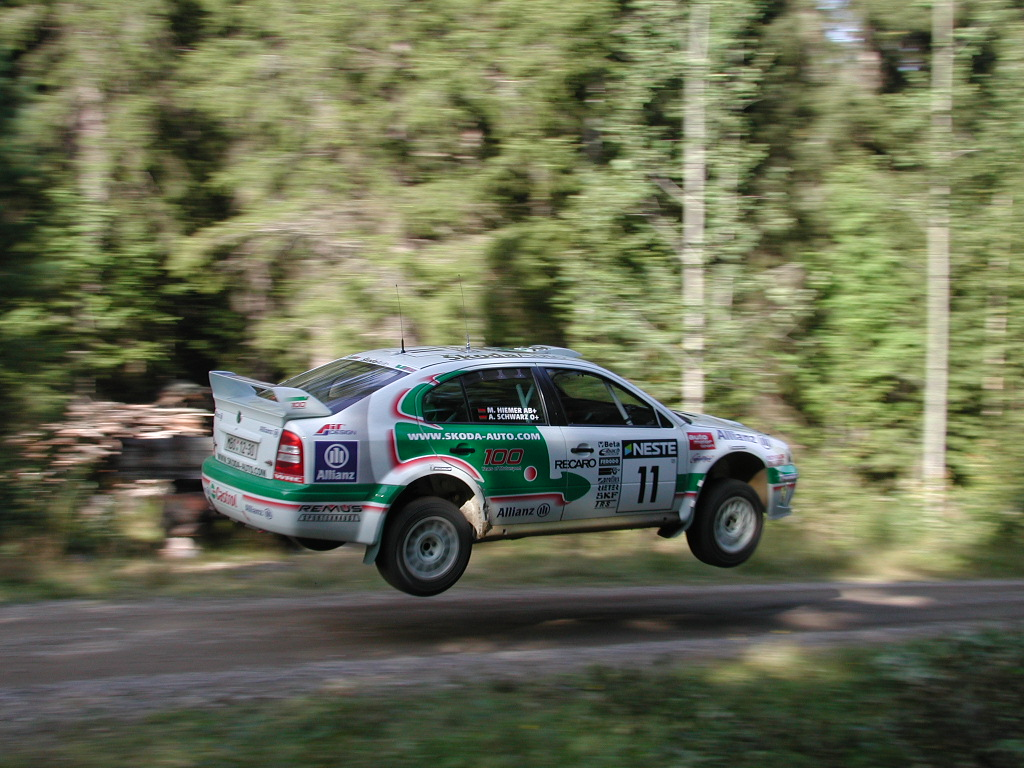
Schwarz at the 2001 Rally Finland.

Schwarz was born in Neustadt an der Aisch in Franken in 1963 and debuted in rallying in 1983. After having won the German Rally Championship for two years in a row, he made his debut in the World Rally Championship in 1988 and was signed by Toyota Team Europe, Toyota's factory WRC team, for the 1990 season.

Driving a Toyota Celica GT-Four, Schwarz led a world championship rally for the first time at the 1990 Rally Portugal, took his first podium finish at the 1991 Rally Australia and his first and only win at the 1991 Rally Catalunya.

In 1996, due to Toyota's 12-month ban from the WRC, Schwarz drove for the team in the European Rally Championship. He won the Manx International Rally and the Cyprus Rally and captured the overall title. Later that same year, he drove to victory in the RAC Rally, then part of the 2-Litre World Championship ("Formula 2").

In 1997, Schwarz drove for the now Cumbria based M-Sport Ford rally team but was later replaced by Juha Kankkunen after a series of disappointing performances.

In the 1999 season, after stints with Mitsubishi and Ford, Schwarz started his long partnership with the debuting Škoda works team. His best result with the team was third place at the 2001 Safari Rally. Schwarz retired from the world championship after the 2005 season, during which he took his first points finish in over a year at the season-ending Rally Australia.

Following the successful completion of its Red Bull Young Rally Driver's Search Program, Schwarz joined forces in 2006 with Global Sport Licensing Ltd. ("GSL") and Mr. Baumschlage to create the WRC designated Red Bull Škoda Team. Simultaneously, Schwarz started in 2007 to race, as a GSL racing driver with the support of California-based All German Motorsport team, in the American SCORE International off-road championship which includes among others the internationally famous races Baja 1000.

Schwarz now lives in Austria. He is married with two children, one of them is Fabio Schwarz which as of 2025 will be competing in the WRC 2.

== WRC victories ==
#	Event	Season	Co-driver	Car
1	(Spain) 27º Rallye Catalunya-Costa Brava (Rallye de España)	1991	Arne Hertz	Toyota Celica GT-Four ST165

== Complete World Rally Championship results ==
Year	Entrant	Car	1	2	3	4	5	6	7	8	9	10	11	12	13	14	15	16	WDC	Points
1988	Armin Schwarz	Audi 200 Quattro	MON	SWE	POR	KEN	FRA	GRE	USA	NZL	ARG	FIN	CIV	ITA	GBR; 5				37th	8
1989	Armin Schwarz	Audi 200 Quattro	SWE	MON	POR	KEN	FRA	GRE; 8	NZL	ARG		AUS	ITA; Ret	CIV					41st	7
1989	Schmidt Motorsport	Audi 200 Quattro									FIN; 7				GBR; Ret				41st	7
1990	Toyota Team Europe	Toyota Celica GT-Four ST165	MON; 5	POR; Ret	KEN	FRA; Ret	GRE	NZL	ARG	FIN	AUS	ITA; Ret	CIV	GBR; 7					19th	12
1991	Toyota Team Europe	Toyota Celica GT-Four ST165	MON; 4	SWE	POR; Ret	KEN	FRA; Ret	GRE; 5	NZL	ARG	FIN; 9	AUS; 3	ITA; 8	CIV	ESP; 1	GBR			6th	55
1992	Toyota Team Europe	Toyota Celica Turbo 4WD	MON; Ret	SWE	POR; Ret	KEN	FRA; 5	GRE; Ret	NZL	ARG	FIN	AUS	ITA	CIV	ESP; 5	GBR			19th	16
1993	Mitsubishi Ralliart	Mitsubishi Lancer RS	MON; 6	SWE	POR; Ret	KEN	FRA	GRE; 3	ARG	NZL	FIN; 9	AUS	ITA	ESP	GBR; 8				12th	23
1994	Mitsubishi Ralliart	Mitsubishi Lancer RS	MON; 7	POR	KEN	FRA													7th	31
1994	Mitsubishi Ralliart	Mitsubishi Lancer Evo II					GRE; 2	ARG	NZL; 3	FIN	ITA; Ret	GBR							7th	31
1995	Toyota Castrol Team	Toyota Celica GT-Four ST205	MON; Ret	SWE; 9	POR; 4	FRA; Ret	NZL; 4	AUS; 5	ESP; Ret	GBR									DSQ	30
1997	Ford Motor Co	Ford Escort WRC	MON; 4	SWE; 6	KEN; 4	POR; 3	ESP; Ret	FRA; 9	ARG	GRE	NZL	FIN	IDN	ITA	AUS	GBR			8th	11
1998	R.E.D. World Rally Team	Ford Escort WRC	MON	SWE	KEN	POR	ESP	FRA	ARG	GRE	NZL	FIN	ITA	AUS	GBR; 7				NC	0
1999	Škoda Motorsport	Škoda Octavia WRC	MON; Ret	SWE	KEN	POR; Ret	ESP; Ret	FRA	ARG	GRE; 12	NZL	FIN; Ret	CHN	ITA; Ret	AUS	GBR; Ret			NC	0
2000	Škoda Motorsport	Škoda Octavia WRC	MON; 7	SWE	KEN; 7	POR; 8	ESP; 11	ARG	GRE; 5	NZL	FIN								17th	2
2000	Škoda Motorsport	Škoda Octavia WRC Evo2										CYP; Ret	FRA	ITA; 12	AUS	GBR; 13			17th	2
2001	Škoda Motorsport	Škoda Octavia WRC Evo2	MON; 4	SWE; Ret	POR; Ret	ESP; Ret	ARG; Ret	CYP; 9	GRE; 7	KEN; 3	FIN; 15	NZL	ITA; Ret	FRA; Ret	AUS	GBR; 5			12th	9
2002	Hyundai Castrol World Rally Team	Hyundai Accent WRC2	MON; Ret	SWE; Ret															NC	0
2002	Hyundai Castrol World Rally Team	Hyundai Accent WRC3			FRA; 13	ESP; 16	CYP; 7	ARG; Ret	GRE; 9	KEN; Ret	FIN; 13	GER; Ret	ITA; Ret	NZL; 10	AUS; Ret	GBR; Ret			NC	0
2003	Hyundai World Rally Team	Hyundai Accent WRC3	MON; 8	SWE; 13	TUR; Ret	NZL; Ret	ARG; Ret	GRE; Ret	CYP; 7	GER; 12	FIN; 12	AUS; 13	ITA	FRA	ESP	GBR			18th	3
2004	Škoda Motorsport	Škoda Fabia WRC	MON	SWE	MEX	NZL	CYP	GRE; Ret	TUR	ARG	FIN; 12	GER; 11	JPN	GBR; Ret	ITA; Ret	FRA; 8	ESP; 11	AUS	29th	1
2005	Škoda Motorsport	Škoda Fabia WRC	MON; Ret	SWE	MEX; 9	NZL; 10	ITA; EX	CYP; 13	TUR; Ret	GRE; 18	ARG; 16	FIN; 11	GER; Ret	GBR; 13	JPN; 10	FRA; Ret	ESP; 11	AUS; 8	24th	1

Sporting positions
Preceded by Enrico Bertone	European Rally Champion; 1996	Succeeded by Krzysztof Hołowczyc
Preceded by Alister McRae	Race of Champions; Rally Master; 2000	Succeeded by Not held
