= Ford Escort WRC =

Racing automobile model

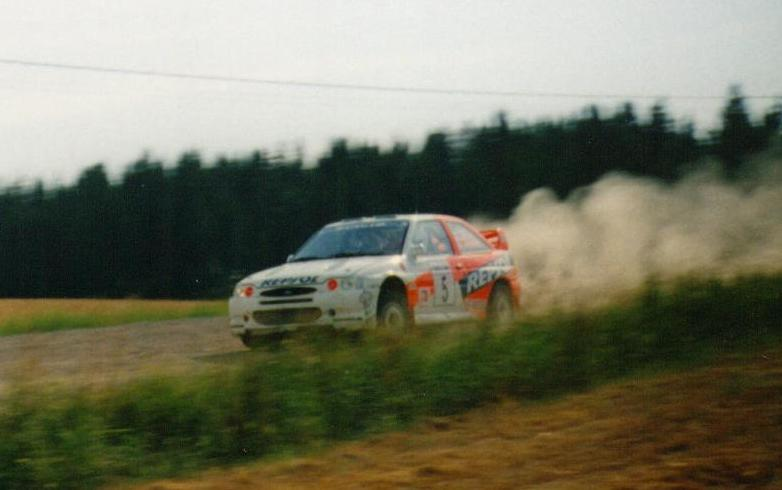
- The Ford Escort WRC in action at the 1997 Rally of Finland with Carlos Sainz at the wheel.
- Category: World Rally Car
- Constructor: Ford
- Designer: Philip Dunabin
- Predecessor: Ford Escort RS Cosworth
- Successor: Ford Focus RS WRC

Technical specifications
- Length: 4,211 mm (165.8 in)
- Width: 1,770 mm (69.7 in)
- Height: 1,425 mm (56.1 in)
- Wheelbase: 2,550 mm (100.4 in)
- Engine: Cosworth YBT 1,993 cubic centimetres (121.6 cu in; 1.993 L) Inline 4 Turbocharged
- Transmission: 6-speed manual
- Power: 304 brake horsepower (308 PS; 227 kW); 490.3 newton-metres (361.6 lbf⋅ft)
- Weight: 1,230 kg (2,711.7 lb)

Competition history (WRC)
- Notable entrants: (United Kingdom) Ford
- Debut: (Monaco) 1997 Monte Carlo Rally
- First win: (Greece) 1997 Acropolis Rally
- Last win: 1997 Rally Indonesia
- Last event: (United Kingdom) 1998 Rally GB
Races	Wins	Podiums	Titles
28	2	23	0
- Constructors' Championships: 0
- Drivers' Championships: 0

Ford Escort WRC is a rally car based on the Ford Escort RS Cosworth with World Rally Car homologation. It was built by M-Sport to compete in the World Rally Championship for the Ford World Rally Team. It replaced the group A version that the brand had used since 1993 and was later replaced by the Ford Focus WRC in 1999.

== Background ==
When the World Rally Car regulation was announced in 1996, Ford had no suitable cars, as the production of the Escort Cosworth discontinued during that year, while the upcoming Ford Focus was still in its early design phase.

Ford Motorsport eventually decided to compete in the 1997 (and 1998) WRC seasons with the Escort adapted to the World Rally Car regulations. In late 1996 M-Sport were awarded the contract to run the Ford World Rally Team, leaving Ford's Boreham base as the research and development centre.

The car was presented at the end of the 1996 Rally Catalunya.

== Competition history ==
=== 1997 ===
The car made its debut at the 1997 Monte Carlo Rally, with the two factory drivers Carlos Sainz and Armin Schwarz. Sainz immediately wins a good second place behind Piero Liatti, a result that the Spaniard repeated in Sweden. Sainz retired at the Safari Rally due to a mechanical problem while Schwarz finished fourth, the German then finished 3rd in Portugal with Sainz again out of the race. In Spain both Escorts do not score points but Sainz hits the second position in Corsica.

From the next rally in Argentina Ford replaced Schwarz with the four-time World Champion Juha Kankkunen, who obtained good results from the beginning, in Greece at the Acropolis Rally Ford made a double with Sainz first in front of Kankkunen; in New Zealand they finish in the same order 2nd and 3rd and in the New Zealand round the Escort WRC is updated and thanks to the FIA homologation of 1 July 1997 it is equipped with a more modern and performing six-speed X-Trac sequential gearbox instead of the "H" linkage as well as numerous other evolutions on suspensions, electronic systems and electronic differential control. Subsequently, Kankkunen finished second in Finland, and then at the Rally of Indonesia Ford made a double again with Sainz 1st and Kankkunen 2nd; will be Escort Wrc's last worldwide win.

The Fords are also fast in Sanremo where Sainz is 4th by a whisker and Kankkunen is 6th. In Australia Sainz is first when he retires, while in the last race of the year, in Wales, Kankkunen finishes 2nd ahead of Sainz 3

=== 1998 ===
In 1998 Ford, after the passage of Carlos Sainz to Toyota, decided to field Juha Kankkunen and the Belgian Bruno Thiry, the latter already a pilot of the blue oval in the seasons '95 and '96 aboard the Ford Escort Group A. The season begins with the best conditions given the evolutions that Ford has made to the model, such as the new engine developed by Tom Walkinshaw's TWR, despite the close retirement to give way to the Ford Focus WRC.

The season starts well, Kankkunen finishes 2nd in Monte Carlo third in Sweden while Thiry finishes 6th and 8th respectively. At the Safari Rally and the Rally of Portugal, Bruno Thiry was replaced (due to injury) by Ari Vatanen, a great connoisseur of dirt roads. Vatanen finishes third in the challenging Safari where Kankkunen is 2nd, while in Portugal Vatanen is 5th and Kankkunen only 7th.

The next rally in Spain sees the return of Bruno Thiry, but for the team managed by Malcolm Wilson it will be a double retirement with Kankkunen going off the road and mechanical failure on Thiry's Escort. In Corsica, the Belgian Thiry proves to be very fast but due to some errors, the race on Napoleon's island relegates the Belgian to fifth place, while Kankkunen only finishes ninth.

In the next two rallies in Argentina and Greece, Kankkunen finished in third place, while Thiry was forced to retire in both races due to engine failure. In New Zealand Thiry crashed off the road while Kankkunen is 4th. After Kankkunen's 3rd place in Finland, the season proceeds quietly for the two Ford drivers.

Ford Escort's last rally with the works team ended with double podium finish in Rally Great Britain.

=== Aftermath ===
With the works team switched to the Focus WRC in 1999, the Escort WRC were run by the privateers until the year 2000.

== WRC victories ==
#	Event	Season	Driver	Co-driver
1	(Greece) 1997 Acropolis Rally	1997	(Spain) Carlos Sainz	(Spain) Luis Moya
2	1997 Rally Indonesia	1997	(Spain) Carlos Sainz	(Spain) Luis Moya

== WRC results ==
Year	Driver	1	2	3	4	5	6	7	8	9	10	11	12	13	14	WDC	Points	WMC	Points
1997	(Spain) Carlos Sainz	MON; 2	SWE; 2	KEN; Ret	POR; Ret	ESP; 10	FRA; 2	ARG; Ret	GRE; 1	NZL; 2	FIN; Ret	IDN; 1	ITA; 4	AUS; Ret	GBR; 3	3rd	51	2nd	91
1997	(Germany) Armin Schwarz	MON; 4	SWE; 6	KEN; 4	POR; 3	ESP; Ret	FRA; 9									8th	11	2nd	91
1997	(Finland) Juha Kankkunen							ARG; Ret	GRC; 2	NZL; 3	FIN; 2	IDN; 2	ITA; 6	AUS; Ret	GBR; 2	4th	29	2nd	91
1997	(Italy) Angelo Medeghini	MON	SWE	KEN	POR	ESP	FRA	ARG	GRE	NZL	FIN	IDN	ITA	AUS	GBR; 10	23rd	2	2nd	91
1998	(Finland) Juha Kankkunen	MON; 2	SWE; 3	KEN; 2	POR; 7	ESP; Ret	FRA; 9	ARG; 3	GRC; 3	NZL; 4	FIN; 3	ITA; Ret	AUS; 5	GBR; 2		4th	39	4th	53
1998	(Belgium) Bruno Thiry	MON; 6	SWE; 8	KEN	POR	ESP; Ret	FRA; 5	ARG; Ret	GRC; Ret	NZL; Ret	FIN; 10	ITA; 6	AUS; 7	GBR; 3		9th	8	4th	53
1998	(Finland) Ari Vatanen	MON	SWE	KEN; 3	POR; 5	ESP	FRA	ARG	GRC	NZL	FIN; Ret	ITA	AUS	GBR		11th	6	4th	53
