= FFW =

FFW may refer to:

- Federation of Free Workers
- Field Fisher Waterhouse LLP
- Fitted For Wireless
- Flash flood warning
- Flying Finn (airline)
- Frankfurt West station, in Frankfurt, Germany
- Future Force Warrior
- The Foot Fist Way, a 2006 American film
- Fast forward wind
- Fast Forward Weekly
