= Flying Finn (airline) =

2003–2004 Finnish low cost airline

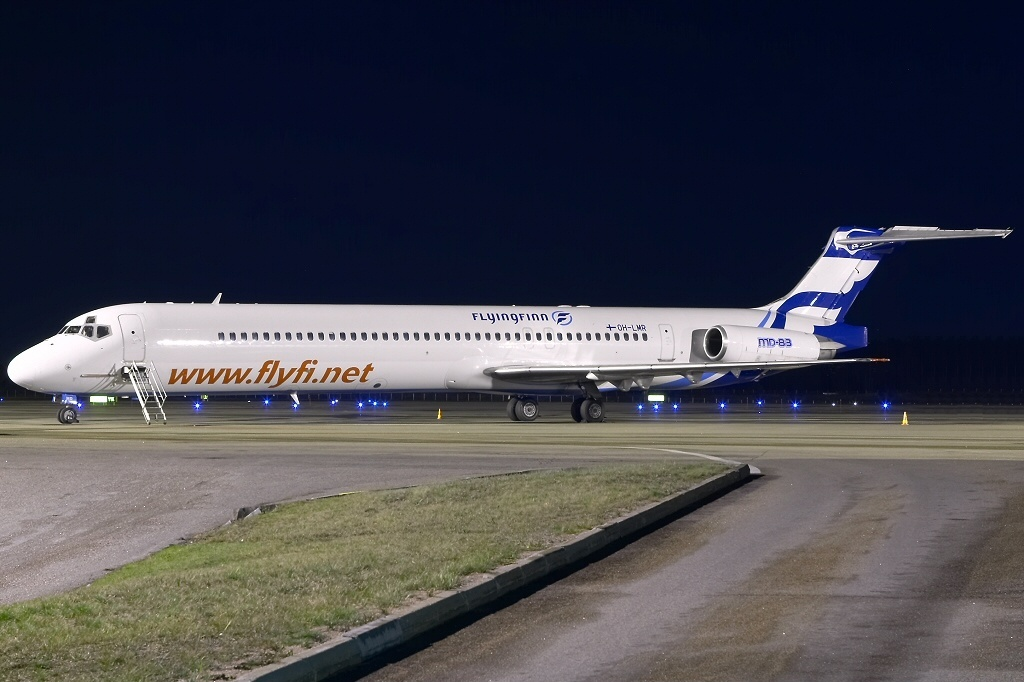
- McDonnell Douglas MD-83
IATA	ICAO	Call sign
–	FFW	FLYINGFINN
- Founded: 2002
- Commenced operations: March 16, 2003
- Ceased operations: January 27, 2004
- Hubs: Helsinki-Vantaa Airport
- Fleet size: 2
- Destinations: 10
- Headquarters: Helsinki, Finland

Flying Finn Oy Swedish: Flying Finn Ab) was a low cost airline, based at Helsinki-Vantaa Airport, Finland.

== History ==
The airline was established in December 2002 and started operations on 16 March 2003. Its cheap air fares were based on the fact that the e-tickets were only sold through Internet and phone. The airline claimed a successful beginning, as the passengers who formerly bought bus and train tickets now bought cheaper flights. The president of the company was Peter Sevelius. The flight captains had been employed from Finnair. It had many celebrities as shareholders, such as the rally driver Juha Kankkunen.

Facing the threat of the termination of aircraft leases and operating license for unpaid debts in January 2004, the financially ailing airline cancelled the flights to London and went into debt restructuring. On January 27, 2004, Flying Finn ceased all the flights and filed for bankruptcy. Over 20,000 passengers were left without refund.

In August 2007, there was speculation by Keskusrikospoliisi (the National Bureau of Investigation) that there were financial irregularities due to the airline accounts, leading to seven former employees being accused of breaking bankruptcy laws.

== Services ==
Flying Finn operated daily flights between Helsinki and Oulu. It also ran limited services between Helsinki and Rovaniemi, Kuopio and London Stansted.

== Fleet ==
The Flying Finn fleet consisted of 2 leased McDonnell Douglas MD-83 aircraft.
