= Denis Giraudet =

French rally co-driver (born 1955)

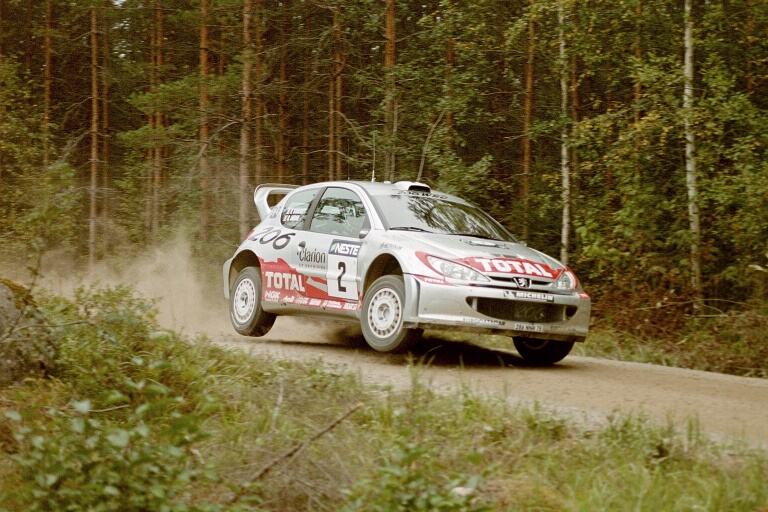
- Giraudet at 2001 Rally Finland with Didier Auriol in a Peugeot 206 WRC.

Personal information
- Nationality: (France) French
- Born: December 16, 1955 (age 70)

World Rally Championship record
- Years active: 1981–1984, 1989, 1991–1993, 1995–2017, 2019, 2024-2025
- Driver: (France) Paul Gardère (France) Philippe Bugalski (France) François Chatriot (Finland) Juha Kankkunen (France) Didier Auriol (Indonesia) Reza Pribadi (Sweden) Thomas Rådström (Germany) Armin Schwarz (France) Nicolas Bernardi (France) Nicolas Vouilloz (France) Stéphane Sarrazin (Japan) Takuma Kamada (Sweden) Daniel Carlsson (Cyprus) Spyros Pavlides (Norway) Eyvind Brynildsen (Belgium) François Duval (United Kingdom) Steve Lancaster (Russia) Evgeny Novikov (France) Romain Dumas (France) Yoann Bonato (France) Bryan Bouffier (United Kingdom) Rhys Yates (France) Raphaël Astier
- Teams: Citroën, Ford, M-Sport Ford, Seat, Škoda, Subaru, Toyota
- Rallies: 190
- Championships: 0
- Rally wins: 5
- Podiums: 25
- Stage wins: 145
- First rally: 1981 Monte Carlo Rally
- First win: 1993 1000 Lakes Rally
- Last win: 2001 Rally Catalunya
- Last rally: 2025 Monte Carlo Rally

Denis Giraudet (born 16 December 1955) is a French rally co-driver.

== Rally career ==
Giraudet started his career in 1981. He won his first rally at 1993 Rally Finland alongside four-time world champion Juha Kankkunen. His most successful partnership was with the 1994 world champion Didier Auriol. His last appearance in the World Rally Championship was at 2019 Monte Carlo Rally, where he was the navigator of Rhys Yates in a Škoda Fabia R5.

== Victories ==
=== WRC victories ===
#	Event	Season	Driver	Car
1.	(Finland) 43. 1000 Lakes Rally	1993	(Finland) Juha Kankkunen	Toyota Celica Turbo 4WD
2.	39. Tour de Corse - Rallye de France	1995	(France) Didier Auriol	Toyota Celica GT-Four
3.	(Spain) 34. Rallye Catalunya - Costa Brava - Rallye de España	1998	(France) Didier Auriol	Toyota Corolla WRC
4.	3. 555 China Rally	1999	(France) Didier Auriol	Toyota Corolla WRC
5.	(Spain) 37. Rallye Catalunya - Costa Brava - Rallye de España	2001	(France) Didier Auriol	Peugeot 206 WRC
