= 1997 Monte Carlo Rally =

Rallying motorsport event

1997 Monte Carlo Rally 65ème Rallye Automobile de Monte-Carlo
Round 1 of the 1997 World Rally Championship
Next event →
- Host country: Monaco
- Dates run: 18 – 23 January 1997
- Stages: 18
- Stage surface: Asphalt/Snow
- Overall distance: 398.31 km (247.50 miles)

Statistics
- Crews: 23 at start, 17 at finish

Overall results
- Overall winner: Italy Piero Liatti; Subaru Impreza; 4:26:58

The 1997 Monte Carlo Rally was the 65th Rallye Automobile de Monte-Carlo. It was won by Piero Liatti.

It was part of the 1997 World Rally Championship.

== Results ==
Pos.	No.	Driver	Car	Time/Retired	Pts.
1	4	(Italy) Piero Liatti	Subaru Impreza WRC97	4:26.58	20
2	5	(Spain) Carlos Sainz	Ford Escort WRC	4:27:53	15
3	1	(Finland) Tommi Mäkinen	Mitsubishi Lancer Evo IV	4:29:29	12
4	6	(Germany) Armin Schwarz	Ford Escort WRC	4:32:03	10
5	2	(Germany) Uwe Nittel	Mitsubishi Lancer Evo III	4:42:42	8
6	15	(Denmark) Henrik Lundgaard	Toyota Celica GT-Four (ST205)	4:45:26	6
7	10	(Switzerland) Olivier Burri	Subaru Impreza 555	4:45:35	4
8	9	(Germany) Isolde Holderied	Toyota Celica GT-Four (ST205)	4:50:39	3
9	23	(Uruguay) Gustavo Trelles	Mitsubishi Lancer Evo III	4:51:59	2
10	25	(Germany) Armin Kremer	Mitsubishi Lancer Evo III	4:52:51	1
