= 1997 Rally Finland =

Motor rally competition

1997 Rally Finland 47th Neste Rally Finland
Part of the 1997 World Rally Championship season
← Previous event	Next event →
- Host country: Finland
- Rally base: Jyväskylä
- Dates run: August 29 1997 – August 31 1997
- Length: 381.55 km (237.08 miles)
- Stage surface: Gravel
- Overall distance: 1,171.79 km (728.12 miles)

Statistics
- Crews: 103 at start, 50 at finish

Overall results
- Overall winner: (Finland) Tommi Makinen (Finland) Seppo Harjanne (Japan) Marlboro Mitsubishi Ralliart; Mitsubishi Lancer Evo IV

The 1997 Rally Finland (also known as the 47th Neste Rally Finland) event was held from 29 to 31 August 1997. The rally took place in Jyväskylä, Finland. The winner was Tommi Makinen, with Seppo Harjanne as co-driver, driving a Mitsubishi Lancer Evolution 4.

== Overview ==
The total length of the race was 1171.79km, which included road sections. The total liaison distance was 790.24km and the total special stage distance was 381.55km over gravel.

AKK Sports, the marketing company of the Finnish ASN, AKK-Motorsport, took over organizing the event, earning praise from WRC teams for safety. This change culminated in the changing of its name to Neste Rally Finland. The company's target was to develop a clearly defined brand for the rally. A new special stage was added at Hippos, along with a VIP area for 1,600 guests. The following year, teams voted it Rally of the Year. Mäkinen, on his way to a third consecutive title, set a record with his fifth straight Rally Finland win. Ice hockey star and auto racing enthusiast Teemu Selänne, also competed, finishing 33rd in 1997 and 24th in 1998. Despite some environmental protests, a 1997 study by the University of Jyväskylä found the impact to be minimal, with noise pollution being the main concern. There were 105 participant entries.

== Background ==
=== Itinerary ===
All dates and times are EEST (UTC+3)

Date	Time	No.	Stage name	Distance
Leg 1 — 70.45 km
29 August	14:53	SS1	Parkkola	33.43 km
29 August	16:31	SS2	Keuruu	11.86 km
29 August	16:58	SS3	Jukojarvi	23.47 km
29 August	1:69	SS4	Hippos	18.55 km
Leg 2 — 186.81 km
30 August	06:54	SS5	Leustu	23.57 km
30 August	08:19	SS6	Rapsula	18.47 km
30 August	09:16	SS7	Päijälä	23.40 km
30 August	11:08	SS8	Sahalahti	20.50 km
30 August	12:06	SS9	Siitama	14.70 km
30 August	13:34	SS10	Vastila	17.46 km
30 August	14:24	SS11	Ouninpohja	32.82 km
30 August	15:56	SS12	Vaheri	31.32 km
30 August	16:40	SS13	Himos	2 km
30 August	18:50	SS14	Harju	2.57 km
Leg 3 — 124.29 km
31 August	09:01	SS15	Lempaa 1	28.40 km
31 August	10:04	SS16	Vartiamaki 1	12.60 km
31 August	10:33	SS17	Hauhanpohja 1	11.34 km
31 August	11:31	SS18	Lempaa 2	28.40 km
31 August	12:34	SS19	Vartiamaki 2	12.60 km
31 August	13:03	SS20	Hauhanpohja 2	11.34 km
31 August	14:55	SS21	Ruuhimaki	7.28 km
31 August	15:43	SS22	Laukaa	12.33 km
31 August	Source:			

== Results ==
=== Overall ===
Pos.	No.	Driver	Co-driver	Team	Car	Time	Difference	Points
1	1	(Finland) Tommi Mäkinen	(Finland) Seppo Harjanne	(Japan) Marlboro Mitsubishi Ralliart	Mitsubishi Lancer Evo IV	3:16:18		10
2	6	(Finland) Juha Kankkunen	(Finland) Juha Repo	(United States) Ford Motor Co. Ltd.	Ford Escort WRC	3:16:25	+0:07	6
3	9	(Finland) Jarmo Kytölehto	(Finland) Arto Kapanen	(United States) Ford Motor Co. Ltd.	Ford Escort WRC	3:18:18	+2:00	4
4	11	(Finland) Sebastian Lindholm	(Finland) Timo Hantunen	(United States) Ford Motor Co. Ltd.	Ford Escort WRC	3:18:53	+2:35	3
5	13	(Sweden) Tomas Jansson	(Sweden) Pecka Svensson	(Japan) Toyota	Toyota Celica GT-Four	3:21:12	+4:54	2
6	12	(Finland) Pasi Hagström	(Finland) Tero Gardemeister	(Japan) Toyota	Toyota Celica GT-Four	3:22:48	+6:30	1

== Awards ==
The Finland Rally 1997 event won the Award of Excellence. It also won an Outstanding Safety Effort, which awarded to them by the FIA registered teams.

Previous rally: 1997 Rally New Zealand	1997 FIA World Rally Championship	Next rally: 1997 Rally Indonesia
Previous rally: 1996 Rally Finland	1997 Rally Finland	Next rally: 1998 Rally Finland
