= 1997 Rally Australia =

The 1997 Rally Australia was a motor racing event for rally cars. The event was held between October 29 and November 1, 1997, in Perth, Western Australia.
