= Vovos =

Vovos is a Greek surname. Notable people with the surname include:

- Armodios Vovos (born 1964), Greek businessman
- Babis Vovos (1933–2024), Greek businessman, father of Armodios
