= 2002 World Rally Championship =

30th season of the FIA World Rally Championship

Champions
- World Drivers' Champion: Marcus Grönholm
- World Manufacturers' Champion: Peugeot

Seasons
- ← 2001 2003 →

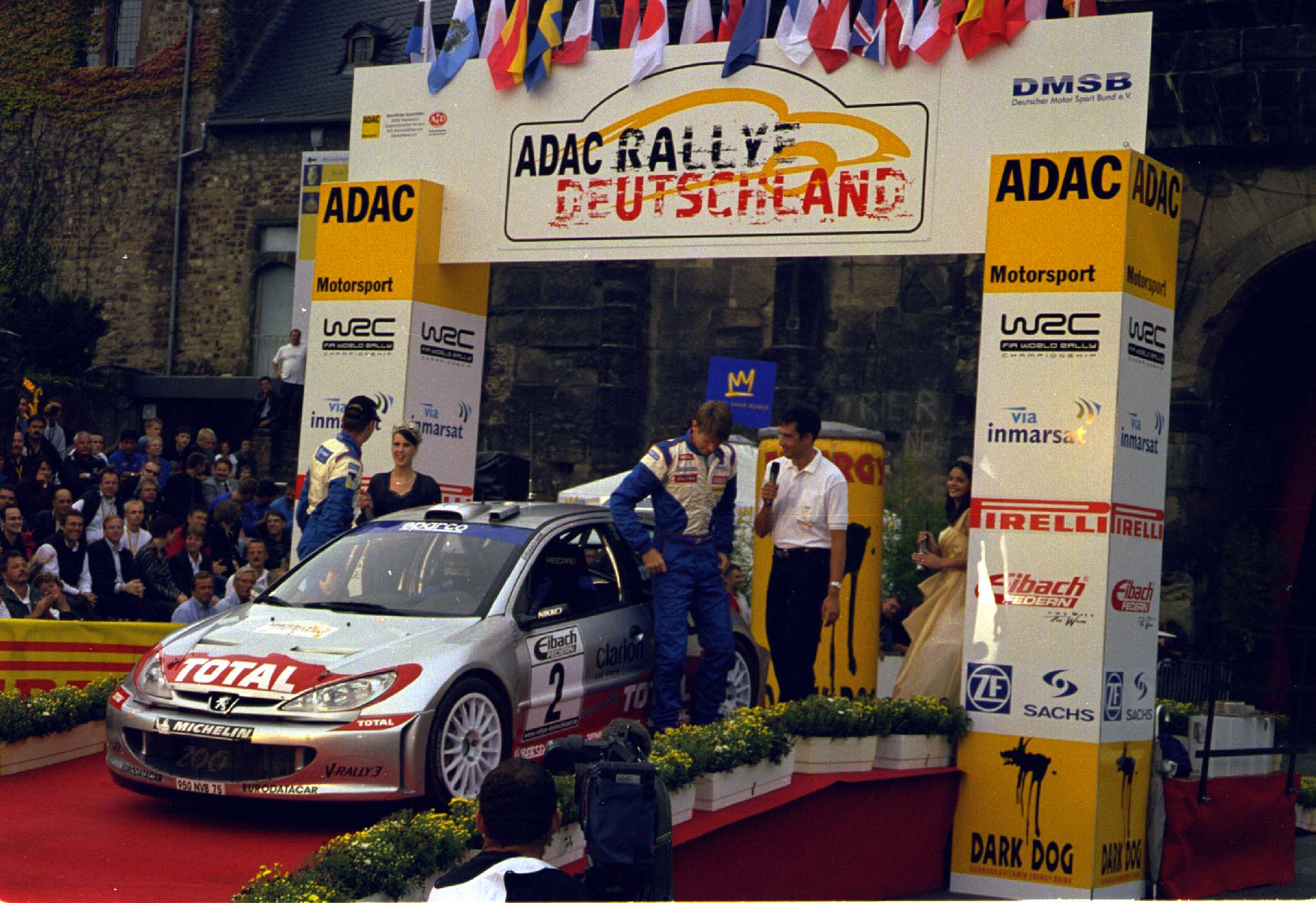
Eventual champion Marcus Grönholm at the ceremonial start of the 2002 Rallye Deutschland.

The 2002 World Rally Championship was the 30th season of the FIA World Rally Championship. The season consisted of 14 rallies. Marcus Grönholm won his second drivers' world championship in a Peugeot 206 WRC, ahead of Petter Solberg and Carlos Sainz. The manufacturers' title was won by Peugeot, ahead of Ford and Subaru.

== Calendar ==
The 2002 championship was contested over fourteen rounds in Europe, Africa, South America and Oceania.

Rd.	Start date	Finish date	Rally	Rally headquarters	Surface	Stages	Distance	Support class
1	17 January	20 January	(Monaco) 70th Rallye Automobile Monte Carlo	Monte Carlo	Mixed	15	388.38 km	JWRC
2	1 February	3 February	(Sweden) 51st Uddeholm Swedish Rally	Karlstad, Värmland County	Snow	16	381.96 km	PWRC
3	7 March	10 March	46th Tour de Corse - Rallye de France	Ajaccio, Corsica	Tarmac	16	357.70 km	PWRC
4	21 March	24 March	(Spain) 38th Rally Catalunya - Costa Brava - Rally de España	Lloret de Mar, Catalonia	Tarmac	18	394.98 km	JWRC
5	19 April	21 April	30th Cyprus Rally	Limassol, Limassol District	Gravel	20	324.17 km	PWRC
6	16 May	19 May	22nd Rally Argentina	Carlos Paz, Córdoba	Gravel	22	381.45 km	PWRC
7	13 June	16 June	(Greece) 49th Acropolis Rally	Lamia, Central Greece	Gravel	16	391.50 km	JWRC
8	12 July	14 July	(Kenya) 50th Inmarsat Safari Rally	Nairobi	Gravel	12	1010.80 km	PWRC
9	8 August	11 August	52nd Neste Rally Finland	Jyväskylä, Central Finland	Gravel	22	401.68 km	PWRC
10	22 August	25 August	(Germany) 21st ADAC Rallye Deutschland	Trier, Rhineland-Palatinate	Tarmac	23	415.57 km	JWRC
11	19 September	22 September	(Italy) 44th Rallye Sanremo - Rallye d'Italia	Sanremo, Liguria	Tarmac	18	385.84 km	JWRC
12	3 October	6 October	33rd Propecia Rally New Zealand	Manukau, Auckland	Gravel	26	411.40 km	PWRC
13	31 October	3 November	15th Telstra Rally Australia	Perth, Western Australia	Gravel	24	388.64 km	PWRC
14	14 November	17 November	(United Kingdom) 58th Network Q Rally of Great Britain	Cardiff, Wales	Gravel	17	390.57 km	JWRC

=== Calendar changes ===
Rallye de Portugal was dropped from the calendar after a disastrous running of the event in 2001 due to heavy rain which was heavily criticized by drivers such as Marcus Grönholm, Colin McRae and Richard Burns. It was replaced by Rallye Deutschland which had an impressive candidate Rally in 2001 won by Philippe Bugalski after main rival Marcus Gronholm received a puncture and spun multiple times.

The Tour de Corse was moved to be earlier in the season while Rally New Zealand was moved later to be back to back with Rally Australia while the Cyprus Rally and Rally Argentina swapped places.

FIA President Max Mosley had stated that Japan and India had been two candidates to join the World Rally Championship but neither materialized for the 2002 season. Japan would create Rally Hokkaido for the 2002 Asia-Pacific Rally Championship which would join the WRC as Rally Japan in 2004 while India would likewise create Rally India in Mumbai for the 2003 APRC season although this would fail to join the WRC.

== Teams and drivers ==
World Rally Car entries eligible to score manufacturer points
Manufacturer	Car	Team	Tyre	No	Drivers	Co-Drivers	Rounds
Peugeot	206 WRC	(France) Peugeot Total	M	1	(United Kingdom) Richard Burns	(United Kingdom) Robert Reid	All
Peugeot	206 WRC	(France) Peugeot Total	M	2	(Finland) Marcus Grönholm	(Finland) Timo Rautiainen	All
Peugeot	206 WRC	(France) Peugeot Total	M	3	(France) Gilles Panizzi	(France) Hervé Panizzi	1, 3–4, 11
Peugeot	206 WRC	(France) Peugeot Total	M	3	(Finland) Harri Rovanperä	(Finland) Risto Pietiläinen	2, 5–8, 14
Peugeot	206 WRC	(France) Peugeot Total	M	3	(Finland) Harri Rovanperä	(Finland) Voitto Silander	9–10, 12-13
Ford	Focus RS WRC 02	(United States) Ford Motor Co Ltd	P	4	(Spain) Carlos Sainz	(Spain) Luis Moya	1–3, 5–14
Ford	Focus RS WRC 02	(United States) Ford Motor Co Ltd	P	4	(Spain) Carlos Sainz	(Spain) Marc Marti	4
Ford	Focus RS WRC 02	(United States) Ford Motor Co Ltd	P	5	(Scotland) Colin McRae	(Wales) Nicky Grist	1–12
Ford	Focus RS WRC 02	(United States) Ford Motor Co Ltd	P	5	(Scotland) Colin McRae	(Scotland) Derek Ringer	13–14
Ford	Focus RS WRC 02	(United States) Ford Motor Co Ltd	P	6	(Estonia) Markko Märtin	(United Kingdom) Michael Park	All
Mitsubishi	Lancer Evo WRC 1-8; Lancer Evo WRC2 9-14	(Japan) Marlboro Mitsubishi Ralliart	M	7	(France) François Delecour	(France) Daniel Grataloup	1–13
Mitsubishi	Lancer Evo WRC 1-8; Lancer Evo WRC2 9-14	(Japan) Marlboro Mitsubishi Ralliart	M	7	(France) François Delecour	(France) Dominique Savignoni	14
Mitsubishi	Lancer Evo WRC 1-8; Lancer Evo WRC2 9-14	(Japan) Marlboro Mitsubishi Ralliart	M	8	(Scotland) Alister McRae	(United Kingdom) David Senior	1–11
Mitsubishi	Lancer Evo WRC 1-8; Lancer Evo WRC2 9-14	(Japan) Marlboro Mitsubishi Ralliart	M	8	(United Kingdom) Justin Dale	(United Kingdom) Andrew Bargery	14
Mitsubishi	Lancer Evo WRC 1-8; Lancer Evo WRC2 9-14	(Japan) Marlboro Mitsubishi Ralliart	M	9	(Finland) Jani Paasonen	(Finland) Arto Kapanen	2, 5, 9, 12–14
Subaru	Impreza WRC2001 1-6 Impreza WRC2002 5-14	(Japan) 555 Subaru World Rally Team	P	10	(Finland) Tommi Mäkinen	(Finland) Kaj Lindström	All
Subaru	Impreza WRC2001 1-6 Impreza WRC2002 5-14	(Japan) 555 Subaru World Rally Team	P	11	(Norway) Petter Solberg	(Wales) Phil Mills	All
Subaru	Impreza WRC2001 1-6 Impreza WRC2002 5-14	(Japan) 555 Subaru World Rally Team	P	12	(Japan) Toshihiro Arai	(New Zealand) Tony Sircombe	7
Škoda	Octavia WRC Evo2 1-8 Octavia WRC Evo3 9-14	(Czech Republic) Škoda Motorsport	M	14	(Sweden) Kenneth Eriksson	(Sweden) Tina Thörner	All
Škoda	Octavia WRC Evo2 1-8 Octavia WRC Evo3 9-14	(Czech Republic) Škoda Motorsport	M	15	(Finland) Toni Gardemeister	(Finland) Paavo Lukander	All
Škoda	Octavia WRC Evo2 1-8 Octavia WRC Evo3 9-14	(Czech Republic) Škoda Motorsport	M	16	(Czech Republic) Roman Kresta	(Czech Republic) Jan Tománek	1, 3, 5, 8, 11
Škoda	Octavia WRC Evo2 1-8 Octavia WRC Evo3 9-14	(Czech Republic) Škoda Motorsport	M	16	(Czech Republic) Roman Kresta	(Czech Republic) Miloš Hůlka	14
Škoda	Octavia WRC Evo2 1-8 Octavia WRC Evo3 9-14	(Czech Republic) Škoda Motorsport	M	16	(Sweden) Stig Blomqvist	(Venezuela) Ana Goñi	2, 4, 7
Škoda	Octavia WRC Evo2 1-8 Octavia WRC Evo3 9-14	(Czech Republic) Škoda Motorsport	M	16	(Argentina) Gabriel Pozzo	(Argentina) Daniel Stillo	4, 6
Hyundai	Accent WRC2 1-2 Accent WRC3 3-14	(South Korea) Hyundai World Rally Team	M	17	(Germany) Armin Schwarz	(Germany) Manfred Hiemer	All
Hyundai	Accent WRC2 1-2 Accent WRC3 3-14	(South Korea) Hyundai World Rally Team	M	18	(Belgium) Freddy Loix	(Belgium) Sven Smeets	All
Hyundai	Accent WRC2 1-2 Accent WRC3 3-14	(South Korea) Hyundai World Rally Team	M	19	(Finland) Juha Kankkunen	(Finland) Juha Repo	2, 5–9, 12–14

World Rally Car entries ineligible to score manufacturer points
Manufacturer	Car	Team	Tyre	Driver	Co-Drivers	Rounds
Citroën	Xsara WRC	(France) Citroën Sport	M	(Sweden) Thomas Rådström	(France) Dennis Giraudet	1–2, 4, 7–9, 14
Citroën	Xsara WRC	(France) Citroën Sport	M	(Spain) Jesús Puras	(Spain) Marc Marti	10
Citroën	Xsara WRC	(France) Citroën Sport	M	(France) Sébastien Loeb	(Monaco) Daniel Elena	1–2, 4, 7–10, 13-14
Citroën	Xsara WRC	(France) Citroën Sport	M	(France) Philippe Bugalski	(France) Jean-Paul Chiaroni	1, 4, 10-11
Ford	Focus RS WRC 02	(United Kingdom) Ford Motor Co Ltd	M	(Belgium) François Duval	(Belgium) Jean-Marc Fortin	5, 9, 13
Ford	Focus RS WRC 02	(United Kingdom) Ford Motor Co Ltd	M	(United Kingdom) Mark Higgins	(United Kingdom) Bryan Thomas	14
Subaru	Impreza WRC2001	(Japan) 555 Subaru World Rally Team	P	(Austria) Achim Mörtl	(Germany) Klaus Wicha	10-11
Subaru	Impreza WRC2002	(Japan) 555 Subaru World Rally Team	P	(Japan) Toshihiro Arai	(New Zealand) Tony Sircombe	10
Toyota	Corolla WRC	(Italy) H.F. Grifone SRL	M	(France) Didier Auriol	(France) Jacques Boyere	1
Toyota	Corolla WRC	(Italy) H.F. Grifone SRL	M	(Finland) Juuso Pykälistö	(Finland) Esko Mertsalmi	2, 5
Toyota	Corolla WRC	(Italy) Top Run SRL	M	(Austria) Manfred Stohl	(Austria) Ilka Minor	1
Toyota	Corolla WRC	(Italy) Top Run SRL	M	(Italy) Marco Menegatto	(Italy) Massimiliano Cerrai	1
Toyota	Corolla WRC	Toyota Castrol Finland		(Finland) Jussi Välimäki	(Finland) Tero Gardemeister	2, 7, 9
Toyota	Corolla WRC	Shell Norway Motorsport	P	(Norway) Henning Solberg	(Norway) Cato Menkerud	2, 9
Toyota	Corolla WRC	(Poland) Polsat Dialog Rally Team	M	(Poland) Tomasz Kuchar	(Poland) Maciek Szczepaniak	2, 7, 12–14
Toyota	Corolla WRC	Marlboro Rally Team Saudi Arabia	M	(Saudi Arabia) Abdullah Bakhashab	(United Kingdom) Bobby Willis	7
Peugeot	206 WRC	(Belgium) Peugeot Bastos Racing	M	(Belgium) Bruno Thiry	(Belgium) Stéphane Prévot	1, 3, 5, 7, 10-11
Peugeot	206 WRC	Peugeot Sport Finland	M	(Finland) Sebastian Lindholm	(Finland) Timo Hantunen	9
Peugeot	206 WRC	(Austria) Powerhorse World Rally Team	M	(Austria) Achim Mörtl	(Germany) Klaus Wicha	3-5
Peugeot	206 WRC	(Italy) H.F. Grifone SRL	M	(Finland) Juuso Pykälistö	(Finland) Esko Mertsalmi	9, 14
Peugeot	206 WRC	(Italy) H.F. Grifone SRL	M	(Italy) Valentino Rossi	(Italy) Carlo Cassina	14
Peugeot	206 WRC	(France) Bozian Racing	M	(Finland) Timo Salonen	(Finland) Launo Heinonen	9
Peugeot	206 WRC	(France) Bozian Racing	M	(Finland) Harri Rovanperä	(Finland) Risto Pietiläinen	1, 3–4
Peugeot	206 WRC	(France) Bozian Racing	M	(Finland) Harri Rovanperä	(Finland) Voitto Silander	11
Peugeot	206 WRC	(France) Bozian Racing	M	(France) Cédric Robert	(France) Gérald Bedon	11
Peugeot	206 WRC	(France) Bozian Racing	M	(France) Gilles Panizzi	(France) Hervé Panizzi	2, 7, 14
Citroën	Xsara WRC	(Spain) Piedrafita Sport	M	(Spain) Jesús Puras	(Spain) Carlos del Barrio	4, 11
Citroën	Xsara WRC	(Spain) Piedrafita Sport	M	(France) Philippe Bugalski	(France) Jean-Paul Chiaroni	3
Ford	Focus RS WRC 01	(Finland) LPM Racing	P	(Finland) Janne Tuohino	(Finland) Petri Vihavainen	2, 5, 9
Ford	Focus RS WRC 01	(Germany) Armin Kremer	P	(Germany) Armin Kremer	(Germany) Klaus Wicha	1
Ford	Focus RS WRC 01	(Germany) Armin Kremer	P	(Germany) Armin Kremer	(Germany) Dieter Schneppenheim	4, 7, 9-10, 14
Škoda	Octavia WRC Evo2	(Argentina) Gabriel Pozzo		(Argentina) Gabriel Pozzo	(Argentina) Daniel Stillo	5, 7
Ford	Focus WRC 99	(Italy) Jolly Club	P	(Italy) Emanuele Dati	(Italy) Massimo Chiapponi	1
Ford	Focus RS WRC 01	(Austria) Stohl Racing	P	(Austria) Manfred Stohl	(Austria) Ilka Minor	5, 14
Ford	Focus RS WRC 01	(Greece) Ford Motor Hellas	P	(Greece) Ioannis Papadimitriou	(United Kingdom) Allan Harryman	7, 14
Ford	Focus RS WRC 01	(Italy) Errepi Racing		(Greece) Armodios Vovos	(Greece) Loris Meletopoulos	7
Ford	Focus WRC 00	(Spain) Ford España	P	(Spain) Txus Jaio	(Spain) Lucas Cruz	14
Subaru	Impreza WRC2000	(Slovakia) Styllex Tuning Prosport	M	(Czech Republic) Tomáš Hrdinka	(Czech Republic) Petr Gross	2
Subaru	Impreza WRC99	(United Kingdom) World Rally HIRE		(United Kingdom) Nigel Heath	(United Kingdom) Steve Lancaster	7-8
Subaru	Impreza WRC99	(United Kingdom) World Rally HIRE	P	(United Kingdom) David Higgins	(United Kingdom) Daniel Barritt	14
Subaru	Impreza WRC2002	(France) F.Dor Rally Team	M	(France) Frédéric Dor	(France) Didier Breton	8
Subaru	Impreza WRC2000	(United Kingdom) 22 Motorsport	P	(Finland) Mikko Hirvonen	(Finland) Jarmo Lehtinen	14
Peugeot	206 WRC	(Switzerland) Olivier Burri	P	(Switzerland) Olivier Burri	(Switzerland) Christophe Hofmann	1
Subaru	Impreza WRC98	(Monaco) Richard Hein	M	(Monaco) Richard Hein	(France) Philippe Servol	1
Škoda	Octavia WRC	(Italy) Riccardo Errani	P	(Italy) Riccardo Errani	(Italy) Stefano Casadio	1, 3
Subaru	Impreza WRC98	(Sweden) Johan Kressner	P	(Sweden) Johan Kressner	(Sweden) Leif Wigert	2
Subaru	Impreza WRC2000	(Czech Republic) Styllex Tuning Prosport	M	(Czech Republic) Tomáš Hrdinka	(Czech Republic) Petr Gross	2
Subaru	Impreza WRC2001	(France) Benoît Rousselot		(France) Benoît Rousselot	(France) Gilles Mondésir	3
Subaru	Impreza WRC99	(France) Jean-Claude Torre		(France) Jean-Claude Torre	(France) Patrick de la Foata	3
Ford	Focus RS WRC 01	(Belgium) François Duval	P	(Belgium) François Duval	(Belgium) Jean-Marc Fortin	2-3
Toyota	Corolla WRC	(Russia) Stanislav Gryazin	M	(Russia) Stanislav Gryazin	(Russia) Dmitriy Eremeev	3-4
Subaru	Impreza WRC98	(Cyprus) Chris Thomas		(Cyprus) Chris Thomas	(Cyprus) Andreas Christodoulides	5
Toyota	Corolla WRC	(Italy) Giovanni Recordati		(Italy) Giovanni Recordati	(Monaco) Freddy Delorme	7
Ford	Focus RS WRC 01	(Greece) Armodios Vovos		(Greece) Armodios Vovos	(Greece) "El-Em"	7
Ford	Focus RS WRC 01	(Finland) Jari Viita		(Finland) Jari Viita	(Finland) Riku Rousku	9
Ford	Focus WRC 99	(Estonia) Urmo Aava		(Estonia) Urmo Aava	(Estonia) Toomas Kitsing	9
Škoda	Octavia WRC Evo2	(Slovakia) Mimex Motorsport	M	(Slovakia) Tibor Cserhalmi	(Slovakia) Karol Bodnár	10
Toyota	Corolla WRC	(Germany) Autostal Duindistel	M	(Netherlands) Rocco Theunissen	(Belgium) Elisabeth 'Lilly' Genten	10
Toyota	Corolla WRC	(Netherlands) Wevers Sport	M	(Netherlands) Erik Wevers	(Netherlands) Michiel Poel	10
Toyota	Corolla WRC	(Czech Republic) Matador Czech National Team	M	(Czech Republic) Jan Kopecký	(Czech Republic) Filip Schovánek	10
Toyota	Corolla WRC	(Republic of Ireland) Austin MacHale	M	(Republic of Ireland) Austin MacHale	(Republic of Ireland) Brian Murphy	14
Subaru	Impreza WRC99	(Republic of Ireland) Eamonn Boland		(Republic of Ireland) Eamonn Boland	(Republic of Ireland) Francis Regan	14
Subaru	Impreza WRC99	(United Kingdom) Gareth Jones		(United Kingdom) Gareth Jones	(United Kingdom) Ryland James	14
Subaru	Impreza WRC99	(United Kingdom) Stephen Harron	P	(United Kingdom) Stephen Harron	(United Kingdom) Philip McCrea	14
Subaru	Impreza WRC98	(United Kingdom) Steve Fleck		(United Kingdom) Steve Fleck	(United Kingdom) Mark Aspinwall	14
Subaru	Impreza WRC2000	(United Kingdom) Peter Stephenson		(United Kingdom) Peter Stephenson	(United Kingdom) Allan Whittaker	14
Hyundai	Accent WRC2	(Norway) Kristian Kolberg		(Norway) Kristian Kolberg	(Norway) Kjell Peterssen	2
Hyundai	Accent WRC2	(Norway) Thomas Kolberg		(Norway) Thomas Kolberg	(Norway) Ola Fløene	2
Hyundai	Accent WRC3	(South Korea) Hyundai World Rally Team	M	(Poland) Tomasz Kuchar	(Poland) Maciek Szczepaniak	3, 5
Hyundai	Accent WRC3	(South Korea) Hyundai World Rally Team	M	(United Kingdom) Natalie Barratt	(United Kingdom) Roger Freeman	4, 7, 12–14
Škoda	Octavia WRC Evo3	(Germany) Škoda Auto Deutschland	M	(Germany) Matthias Kahle	(Germany) Peter Göbel	10

=== JWRC entries ===
Team	Manufacturer	Car	No	Drivers	Co-drivers	Rounds
(Italy) Vieffe Corse Srl	Citroën	Saxo S1600	51	(Italy) Andrea Dallavilla	(Italy) Giovanni Bernacchini	1, 4, 7, 10–11, 14
(Italy) Vieffe Corse Srl	Citroën	Saxo S1600	66	(San Marino) Mirco Baldacci	(Italy) Maurizio Barone	1, 4, 7, 10–11, 14
(Germany) Opel Motorsport	Opel	Corsa S1600	52	(United Kingdom) Niall McShea	(United Kingdom) Michael Orr	1, 4, 7, 10–11, 14
(Germany) Opel Motorsport	Opel	Corsa S1600	54	(Norway) Martin Stenshorne	(United Kingdom) Clive Jenkins	7, 10
(Germany) Opel Motorsport	Opel	Corsa S1600	70	(Germany) Sven Haaf	(Germany) Michael Kölbach	11, 14
(Italy) Top Run SRL	Fiat	Punto S1600	53	(Italy) Giandomenico Basso	(Italy) Luigi Pirollo	1, 4, 7, 10–11, 14
(Italy) Top Run SRL	Fiat	Punto S1600	64	(Italy) Gianluigi Galli	(Italy) Guido D'Amore	1, 4, 7, 10–11, 14
(Finland) ST Motors	Peugeot	206 S1600	54	(Norway) Martin Stenshorne	(Finland) Jakke Honkanen	1, 4
(United States) Ford Motor Co Ltd	Ford	Puma S1600	55	(Belgium) François Duval	(Belgium) Jean-Marc Fortin	1, 4, 7, 10–11, 14
(United States) Ford Motor Co Ltd	Ford	Puma S1600	76	(Norway) Alexander Foss	(United Kingdom) Claire Mole	1
(United States) Ford Motor Co Ltd	Ford	Puma S1600	76	(Norway) Alexander Foss	(Norway) Cato Menkerud	4, 7, 10–11, 14
(France) Citroën Sport	Citroën	Saxo S1600	56	(Finland) Jussi Välimäki	(Finland) Tero Gardemeister	1, 4, 7, 10–11, 14
(France) Citroën Sport	Citroën	Saxo S1600	62	(Finland) Janne Tuohino	(Finland) Petri Vihavainen	1, 4, 7, 10–11, 14
(France) Citroën Sport	Citroën	Saxo S1600	65	(Spain) Daniel Solà	(Spain) David Moreno	1
(France) Citroën Sport	Citroën	Saxo S1600	65	(Spain) Daniel Solà	(Spain) Álex Romaní	4, 7, 10–11, 14
(France) Citroën Sport	Citroën	Saxo S1600	70	(Germany) Sven Haaf	(Germany) Michael Kölbach	1, 4, 7, 10
(Italy) Astra Racing	Ford	Puma S1600	57	(Paraguay) Alejandro Galanti	(Spain) Xavier Amigó	1, 4, 7, 10–11, 14
(Italy) Astra Racing	Ford	Puma S1600	63	(United Kingdom) Martin Rowe	(United Kingdom) Chris Wood	1, 4, 7, 10–11, 14
(Italy) Astra Racing	Ford	Puma S1600	67	(Sweden) Daniel Carlsson	(Sweden) Per Karlsson	1
(Italy) Astra Racing	Ford	Puma S1600	67	(Sweden) Daniel Carlsson	(Sweden) Mattias Andersson	4, 7, 10–11, 14
(Italy) Astra Racing	Ford	Puma S1600	72	(Spain) Marc Blázquez	(Spain) Oriol Julià	1, 4
(Italy) Astra Racing	Ford	Puma S1600	78	(Lebanon) Roger Feghali	(Italy) Nicola Arena	1, 4, 7, 10–11, 14
(Italy) Hawk Racing Club	Fiat	Punto S1600	58	(Italy) Christian Chemin	(Italy) Simone Scattolin	1, 4, 7, 10–11, 14
(Japan) Suzuki Sport	Suzuki	Ignis S1600	59	(Finland) Juha Kangas	(Finland) Mika Ovaskainen	1
(Japan) Suzuki Sport	Suzuki	Ignis S1600	59	(Finland) Juha Kangas	(Finland) Jani Laaksonen	4, 7, 10–11, 14
(Japan) Suzuki Sport	Suzuki	Ignis S1600	68	(Germany) Niki Schelle	(Germany) Gerhard Weiss	1, 4, 7
(Japan) Suzuki Sport	Suzuki	Ignis S1600	68	(Germany) Niki Schelle	(Germany) Tanja Geilhausen	10–11, 14
(Japan) Suzuki Sport	Suzuki	Ignis S1600	75	(Japan) Kazuhiko Niwa	(Japan) Kohei Kusaka	1, 4
(Japan) Suzuki Sport	Suzuki	Ignis S1600	75	(Japan) Kazuhiko Niwa	(Japan) Tatsuya Ideue	7, 10–11, 14
(Italy) Procar Rally Team	Peugeot	206 S1600	60	(Italy) Nicola Caldani	(Italy) Sauro Farnocchia	1, 4
(Italy) Procar Rally Team	Fiat	Punto S1600	60	(Italy) Nicola Caldani	(Italy) Dario D'Esposito	7, 10–11, 14
(United Kingdom) MG Sport & Racing	MG	ZR S1600	61	(United Kingdom) Gwyndaf Evans	(Republic of Ireland) Chris Patterson	1, 4, 7, 10–11, 14
(Germany) Volkswagen Racing	Volkswagen	Polo S1600	69	(Finland) Kosti Katajamäki	(Finland) Lasse Hirvijärvi	1, 4
(Germany) Volkswagen Racing	Volkswagen	Polo S1600	69	(Finland) Kosti Katajamäki	(Finland) Jakke Honkanen	7, 10–11, 14
(Austria) Schmidt Racing	Peugeot	206 S1600	71	(Austria) David Doppelreiter	(Austria) Thomas Lettner	1, 4, 7
(Austria) Schmidt Racing	Peugeot	206 S1600	71	(Austria) David Doppelreiter	(Norway) Ola Fløene	10–11, 14
(Spain) Pronto Racing	Fiat	Punto S1600	73	(Andorra) Albert Llovera	(Spain) Marc Corral	1, 4, 7, 10–11, 14
(Spain) Fiat Auto España	Fiat	Punto S1600	77	(Spain) Paco Roig	(Spain) Joan Sureda	1, 4
(Spain) Fiat Auto España	Fiat	Punto S1600	77	(Spain) Paco Roig	(Spain) Ezequiel Nazabal	7

=== PWRC entries ===
Team	Manufacturer	Car	No	Drivers	Co-drivers	Rounds
(Italy) Mauro Rally Tuning	Mitsubishi	Lancer Evo VI	51	(Uruguay) Gustavo Trelles	(Argentina) Jorge Del Buono	2
(Italy) Mauro Rally Tuning	Mitsubishi	Lancer Evo VII	51	(Uruguay) Gustavo Trelles	(Argentina) Jorge Del Buono	3, 5–6
(Italy) Mauro Rally Tuning	Mitsubishi	Lancer Evo VII	54	(Peru) Ramón Ferreyros	(Spain) Diego Vallejo	3, 5–6, 9
(Italy) Mauro Rally Tuning	Mitsubishi	Lancer Evo VII	54	(Peru) Ramón Ferreyros	(Argentina) Jorge Del Buono	12–13
(Italy) Mauro Rally Tuning	Mitsubishi	Lancer Evo VII	66	(Bulgaria) Dimitar Iliev	(Bulgaria) Petar Sivov	2–3, 5, 9, 12–13
(Italy) Top Run SRL	Mitsubishi	Lancer Evo VII	52	(Argentina) Marcos Ligato	(Argentina) Rubén García	5–6, 9, 12–13
(Italy) Top Run SRL	Mitsubishi	Lancer Evo VI	52	(Argentina) Marcos Ligato	(Argentina) Rubén García	8
(Italy) Top Run SRL	Mitsubishi	Lancer Evo VI	58	(Italy) Luca Baldini	(Italy) Marco Muzzarelli	3, 5–6, 9, 12–13
(Italy) Top Run SRL	Mitsubishi	Lancer Evo VI	62	(Italy) Norberto Cangani	(Italy) Eros di Prima	2–3
(Italy) Top Run SRL	Mitsubishi	Lancer Evo VI	70	(Italy) Giovanni Manfrinato	(Italy) Claudio Condotta	3, 5–6, 9, 12–13
(Italy) Top Run SRL	Mitsubishi	Lancer Evo VI	71	(Italy) Stefano Marrini	(Italy) Tiziana Sandroni	5
(Italy) Top Run SRL	Mitsubishi	Lancer Evo VII	71	(Italy) Stefano Marrini	(Italy) Tiziana Sandroni	3, 6, 12–13
(Italy) Top Run SRL	Mitsubishi	Lancer Evo IV	71	(Italy) Stefano Marrini	(Italy) Tiziana Sandroni	8
Ralliart Italy	Mitsubishi	Lancer Evo VII	53	(Italy) Alex Fiorio	(Italy) Enrico Cantoni	2–3, 5, 12–13
Ralliart Italy	Mitsubishi	Lancer Evo VII	53	(Italy) Alex Fiorio	(Italy) Vittorio Bramvilla	9
Ralliart Italy	Mitsubishi	Lancer Evo VI	53	(Italy) Alex Fiorio	(Italy) Vittorio Bramvilla	8
Ralliart Italy	Mitsubishi	Lancer Evo VI	77	(Italy) Alfredo De Dominicis	(Italy) Rudy Pollet	3
Ralliart Italy	Mitsubishi	Lancer Evo VII	77	(Italy) Alfredo De Dominicis	(Italy) Rudy Pollet	5, 9, 12
Ralliart Italy	Mitsubishi	Lancer Evo VII	77	(Italy) Alfredo De Dominicis	(Italy) Nicola Arena	13
(Lithuania) TDS Racing	Mitsubishi	Lancer Evo VI	55	(Lithuania) Saulius Girdauskas	(Lithuania) Žilvinas Sakalauskas	2–3, 5, 9
Oman Arab World Rally Team	Mitsubishi	Lancer Evo VII	56	(Oman) Hamed Al-Wahaibi	(United Kingdom) Michael Orr	3, 5
(Japan) Spike Subaru Team	Subaru	Impreza WRX STI	57	(Japan) Toshihiro Arai	(New Zealand) Tony Sircombe	2, 5–6, 8, 12–13
(United Kingdom) Natalie Barratt Rallysport	Mitsubishi	Lancer Evo VI	59	(United Kingdom) Natalie Barratt	(United Kingdom) Roger Freeman	2, 5–6
(United Kingdom) Mitsubishi Ralliart UK	Mitsubishi	Lancer Evo VI	60	(United Kingdom) Ben Briant	(United Kingdom) Jayson Brown	5
(Malaysia) Petronas EON Racing Team	Proton	Pert	60	(United Kingdom) Ben Briant	(United Kingdom) Jayson Brown	2–3
(Malaysia) Petronas EON Racing Team	Proton	Pert	74	(Malaysia) Karamjit Singh	(Malaysia) Allen Oh	5–6, 8–9, 12–13
(Italy) Hawk Racing Club	Mitsubishi	Lancer Evo VI	61	(Italy) Marta Candian	(Italy) Mara Biotti	3
(Italy) Ateneo	Mitsubishi	Lancer Evo VII	63	(Italy) Cristoforo Di Miceli	(Italy) Pasquale Riggio	3
(United Kingdom) Elsmore Rallying Team	Mitsubishi	Mitsubishi Lancer Evo VI	64	(United Kingdom) Nik Elsmore	(United Kingdom) Huw Lewis	2–3
(Austria) Stohl Racing	Mitsubishi	Mitsubishi Lancer Evo VI	65	(Austria) Beppo Harrach	(Austria) Jutta Gebert	3, 5–6
(Austria) Stohl Racing	Mitsubishi	Mitsubishi Lancer Evo VI	65	(Austria) Beppo Harrach	(Austria) Peter Müller	9, 12–13
(Finland) Rally Rent Europe	Mitsubishi	Mitsubishi Lancer Evo VI	67	(Finland) Marko Ipatti	(Finland) Kari Kajula	2–3, 9
Subaru France	Subaru	Impreza WRX STI	68	(France) Simon Jean-Joseph	(France) Jacques Boyere	3
(Norway) Kollevold Rally Team	Mitsubishi	Lancer Evo VI	69	(Norway) Bernt Kollevold	(Norway) Olav Bodilsen	2–3
(Norway) Kollevold Rally Team	Mitsubishi	Lancer Evo VI	69	(Norway) Bernt Kollevold	(Norway) Ola Fløene	5, 9
(Norway) Kollevold Rally Team	Mitsubishi	Lancer Evo VII	69	(Norway) Bernt Kollevold	(Norway) Ola Fløene	12–13
(Sweden) Millbrooks World Rally Team	Mitsubishi	Lancer Evo V	72	(Sweden) Joakim Roman	(Sweden) Tina Mitakidou	2, 9
(Sweden) Millbrooks World Rally Team	Mitsubishi	Lancer Evo VI	72	(Sweden) Joakim Roman	(Sweden) Tina Mitakidou	3
(Sweden) Millbrooks World Rally Team	Mitsubishi	Lancer Evo VII	72	(Sweden) Joakim Roman	(Sweden) Tina Mitakidou	5
(United Kingdom) David Sutton Cars Ltd	Mitsubishi	Lancer Evo VI	73	(United Kingdom) Martin Rowe	(United Kingdom) Chris Wood	2–3
(United Kingdom) David Sutton Cars Ltd	Mitsubishi	Lancer Evo VII	73	(United Kingdom) Martin Rowe	(United Kingdom) Chris Wood	5, 9, 12–13
Mitsubishi Ralliart Finland	Mitsubishi	Lancer Evo VI	75	(Finland) Kristian Sohlberg	(Finland) Jukka Aho	2–3, 5
Mitsubishi Ralliart Finland	Mitsubishi	Lancer Evo VII	75	(Finland) Kristian Sohlberg	(Finland) Jakke Honkanen	9, 12–13
(Italy) Jolly Club	Mitsubishi	Lancer Evo VI	76	(Czech Republic) Pavel Valoušek	(Italy) Pierangelo Scalvini	2, 6
(Italy) Jolly Club	Mitsubishi	Lancer Evo VII	76	(Czech Republic) Pavel Valoušek	(Italy) Pierangelo Scalvini	5, 9

== Results and standings ==
=== Rally results ===
The highest finishing competitor entered in each WRC class is listed below. Non-championship entries may have finished ahead of WRC competitors in individual rounds.

Rd.	Rally	Overall winners	PWRC Winners	JWRC winners	Report
1	(Monaco) Monte Carlo	(Japan) No. 10 555 Subaru WRT	N/A	(United States) No. 55 Ford Motor Co	Report
1	(Monaco) Monte Carlo	(Japan) Subaru Impreza S7 WRC '01	N/A	(United States) Ford Puma S1600	Report
1	(Monaco) Monte Carlo	(Finland) Tommi Mäkinen (Finland) Kaj Lindström	N/A	(Belgium) François Duval (Belgium) Jean-Marc Fortin	Report
2	Sweden	(France) No. 2 Peugeot Total	No. 75 Mitsubishi Ralliart Finland	N/A	Report
2	Sweden	(France) Peugeot 206 WRC	(Japan) Mitsubishi Lancer Evo VI	N/A	Report
2	Sweden	(Finland) Marcus Grönholm (Finland) Timo Rautiainen	(Finland) Kristian Sohlberg (Finland) Jukka Aho	N/A	Report
3	France	(France) No. 3 Peugeot Total	(Italy) No. 54 Mauro Rally Tuning	N/A	Report
3	France	(France) Peugeot 206 WRC	(Japan) Mitsubishi Lancer Evo VII	N/A	Report
3	France	(France) Gilles Panizzi (France) Hervé Panizzi	(Peru) Ramón Ferreyros (Spain) Diego Vallejo	N/A	Report
4	Spain	(France) No. 3 Peugeot Total	N/A	(France) No. 65 Citroën Sport	Report
4	Spain	(France) Peugeot 206 WRC	N/A	(France) Citroën Saxo S1600	Report
4	Spain	(France) Gilles Panizzi (France) Herve Panizzi	N/A	(Spain) Dani Solà (Spain) Álex Romaní	Report
5	Cyprus	(France) No. 2 Peugeot Total	(Malaysia) No. 74 Petronas EON Racing Team	N/A	Report
5	Cyprus	(France) Peugeot 206 WRC	(Malaysia) Proton Pert Evo VI	N/A	Report
5	Cyprus	(Finland) Marcus Grönholm (Finland) Timo Rautiainen	(Malaysia) Karamjit Singh (Malaysia) Allen Oh	N/A	Report
6	Argentina	(United States) No. 4 Ford Motor Co	(Italy) No. 54 Mauro Rally Tuning	N/A	Report
6	Argentina	(United States) Ford Focus RS WRC '02	(Japan) Mitsubishi Lancer Evo VII	N/A	Report
6	Argentina	(Spain) Carlos Sainz (Spain) Luis Moya	(Peru) Ramón Ferreyros (Spain) Diego Vallejo	N/A	Report
7	Greece	(United States) No. 5 Ford Motor Co	N/A	(France) No. 62 Citroën Sport	Report
7	Greece	(United States) Ford Focus RS WRC '02	N/A	(France) Citroën Saxo S1600	Report
7	Greece	(United Kingdom) Colin McRae (United Kingdom) Nicky Grist	N/A	(Finland) Janne Tuohino (Finland) Petri Vihavainen	Report
8	Kenya	(United States) No. 5 Ford Motor Co	(Malaysia) No. 74 Petronas EON Racing Team	N/A	Report
8	Kenya	(United States) Ford Focus RS WRC '02	(Malaysia) Proton Pert Evo VI	N/A	Report
8	Kenya	(United Kingdom) Colin McRae (United Kingdom) Nicky Grist	(Malaysia) Karamjit Singh (Malaysia) Allen Oh	N/A	Report
9	Finland	(France) No. 2 Peugeot Total	(Italy) No. 53 Ralliart Italia	N/A	Report
9	Finland	(France) Peugeot 206 WRC	(Japan) Mitsubishi Lancer Evo VII	N/A	Report
9	Finland	(Finland) Marcus Grönholm (Finland) Timo Rautiainen	(Italy) Alessandro Fiorio (Italy) Vittorio Brambilla	N/A	Report
10	Germany	(France) No. 21 Citroën Sport	N/A	(France) No. 65 Citroën Sport	Report
10	Germany	(France) Citroën Xsara WRC	N/A	(France) Citroën Saxo S1600	Report
10	Germany	(France) Sébastien Loeb (Monaco) Daniel Elena	N/A	(Spain) Dani Solà (Spain) Álex Romaní	Report
11	Italy	(France) No. 3 Peugeot Total	N/A	(Italy) No. 51 Vieffe Corse SRL	Report
11	Italy	(France) Peugeot 206 WRC	N/A	(France) Citroën Saxo S1600	Report
11	Italy	(France) Gilles Panizzi (France) Herve Panizzi	N/A	(Italy) Andrea Dallavilla (Italy) Giovanni Bernacchini	Report
12	New Zealand	(France) No. 2 Peugeot Total	No. 75 Mitsubishi Ralliart Finland	N/A	Report
12	New Zealand	(France) Peugeot 206 WRC	(Japan) Mitsubishi Lancer Evo VII	N/A	Report
12	New Zealand	(Finland) Marcus Grönholm (Finland) Timo Rautiainen	(Finland) Kristian Sohlberg (Finland) Jukka Aho	N/A	Report
13	Australia	(France) No. 2 Peugeot Total	(Japan) No. 57 Spike Subaru Team	N/A	Report
13	Australia	(France) Peugeot 206 WRC	(Japan) Subaru Impreza STi N8	N/A	Report
13	Australia	(Finland) Marcus Grönholm (Finland) Timo Rautiainen	(Japan) Toshihiro Arai (New Zealand) Tony Sircombe	N/A	Report
14	(United Kingdom) Britain	(Japan) No. 11 555 Subaru WRT	N/A	(France) No. 65 Citroën Sport	Report
14	(United Kingdom) Britain	(Japan) Subaru Impreza S7 WRC '01	N/A	(France) Citroën Saxo S1600	Report
14	(United Kingdom) Britain	(Norway) Petter Solberg (United Kingdom) Phil Mills	N/A	(Spain) Dani Solà (Spain) Álex Romaní	Report

=== Scoring system ===
Points were awarded to the top six classified finishers in each event.

Position	1st	2nd	3rd	4th	5th	6th
Points	10	6	4	3	2	1

=== Drivers' championship ===
Pos.	Driver	MON (Monaco)	SWE (Sweden)	FRA (France)	ESP (Spain)	CYP (Cyprus)	ARG (Argentina)	GRE (Greece)	KEN (Kenya)	FIN (Finland)	GER (Germany)	ITA (Italy)	NZL (New Zealand)	AUS (Australia)	GBR (United Kingdom)	Pts
1	(Finland) Marcus Grönholm	5	1	2	4	1	DSQ	2	Ret	1	3	2	1	1	Ret	77
2	(Norway) Petter Solberg	6	Ret	5	5	5	2	5	Ret	3	Ret	3	Ret	3	1	37
3	(Spain) Carlos Sainz	3	3	6	Ret	11	1	3	Ret	4	8	Ret	4	4	3	36
4	(United Kingdom) Colin McRae	4	6	Ret	6	6	3	1	1	Ret	4	8	Ret	Ret	5	35
5	(United Kingdom) Richard Burns	8	4	3	2	2	DSQ	Ret	Ret	2	2	4	Ret	Ret	Ret	34
6	(France) Gilles Panizzi	7	16	1	1	10	Ret	Ret	6			1	7	DNS	11	31
7	(Finland) Harri Rovanperä	Ret	2	11	7	4	Ret	4	2	Ret	Ret	9	2	2	7	30
8	(Finland) Tommi Mäkinen	1	Ret	Ret	Ret	3	Ret	Ret	Ret	6	7	Ret	3	DSQ	4	22
9	(Estonia) Markko Märtin	12	DNS	8	8	8	4	6	4	5	6	5	Ret	5	2	20
10	(France) Sébastien Loeb	2	17		Ret			7	5	10	1			7	Ret	18
11	(France) Philippe Bugalski	Ret		4	3						Ret	Ret				7
12	(Sweden) Thomas Rådström	Ret	37		Ret			8	3	Ret					Ret	4
13	(Finland) Toni Gardemeister	10	Ret	12	11	15	5	10	Ret	12	Ret	Ret	8	6	10	3
14	(United Kingdom) Alister McRae	14	5	10	13	Ret	8	Ret	9	Ret	Ret	Ret				2
15	(Belgium) Bruno Thiry	11		Ret	Ret	Ret		12			5	13				2
16	(Finland) Juha Kankkunen		8			Ret	7	Ret	8	Ret			5	Ret	9	2
17	(Sweden) Kenneth Eriksson	13	Ret	Ret	17	9	6	14	Ret	Ret	10	11	Ret	8	13	1
18	(Spain) Jesús Puras				12						Ret	6				1
19	(Belgium) Freddy Loix	Ret	Ret	9	10	Ret	Ret	Ret	Ret	9	Ret	28	6	Ret	8	1
20	(United Kingdom) Mark Higgins														6	1
Pos.	Driver	MON (Monaco)	SWE (Sweden)	FRA (France)	ESP (Spain)	CYP (Cyprus)	ARG (Argentina)	GRE (Greece)	KEN (Kenya)	FIN (Finland)	GER (Germany)	ITA (Italy)	NZL (New Zealand)	AUS (Australia)	GBR (United Kingdom)	Pts

Key
Colour	Result
Gold	Winner
Silver	2nd place
Bronze	3rd place
Green	Points finish
Blue	Non-points finish
Blue	Non-classified finish (NC)
Purple	Did not finish (Ret)
Black	Excluded (EX)
Black	Disqualified (DSQ)
White	Did not start (DNS)
White	Cancelled (C)
Blank	Withdrew entry from the event (WD)

=== Manufacturers' championship ===
Pos.	Manufacturer	No.	MON (Monaco)	SWE (Sweden)	FRA (France)	ESP (Spain)	CYP (Cyprus)	ARG (Argentina)	GRE (Greece)	KEN (Kenya)	FIN (Finland)	GER (Germany)	ITA (Italy)	NZL (New Zealand)	AUS (Australia)	GBR (United Kingdom)	Points
1	(France) Peugeot Total	1	(7)	(4)	(3)	2	2	EX	Ret	Ret	2	1	(4)	Ret	Ret	Ret	165
1	(France) Peugeot Total	2	4	1	2	(3)	1	EX	2	Ret	1	2	2	1	1	Ret	165
1	(France) Peugeot Total	3	6	2	1	1	(4)	Ret	4	2	Ret	Ret	1	2	2	5	165
2	(United States) Ford Motor Co	4	2	3	4	Ret	(9)	1	3	Ret	4	(6)	Ret	4	4	3	104
2	(United States) Ford Motor Co	5	3	5	Ret	4	5	3	1	1	Ret	3	5	Ret	Ret	(5)	104
2	(United States) Ford Motor Co	6	(9)		6	5	7	(4)	(6)	3	5	4	4	Ret	5	2	104
3	(Japan) 555 Subaru World Rally Team	10	1	Ret	Ret	Ret	3	Ret	Ret	Ret	6	5	Ret	3	EX	4	67
3	(Japan) 555 Subaru World Rally Team	11	5	Ret	3	3	4	2	5	Ret	3	Ret	3	Ret	3	1	67
3	(Japan) 555 Subaru World Rally Team	12							9			Ret	Ret				67
4	(South Korea) Hyundai World Rally Team	17	Ret	Ret	10	10	6	Ret	6	Ret	10	Ret	Ret	(9)	Ret	Ret	10
4	(South Korea) Hyundai World Rally Team	18	Ret	Ret	7	7	Ret	Ret	Ret	Ret	8	Ret	9	6	Ret	6	10
4	(South Korea) Hyundai World Rally Team	19		6	Ret		Ret	6	Ret	5	Ret			5	Ret	7	10
5	(Czech Republic) Škoda Motorsport	14	9	Ret	Ret	11	8	5	10	Ret	Ret	7	7	Ret	7	9	9
5	(Czech Republic) Škoda Motorsport	15	8	Ret	9	8	10	4	7	Ret	9	Ret	Ret	7	6	8	9
5	(Czech Republic) Škoda Motorsport	16	Ret	8	11	Ret	Ret	(8)	(11)	4		Ret	8			(10)	9
6	(Japan) Marlboro Mitsubishi Ralliart	7	7	(9)	5	6	9	Ret	8	Ret	Ret	6	6	8	Ret	Ret	9
6	(Japan) Marlboro Mitsubishi Ralliart	8	10	4	8	9	Ret	7	Ret	6	Ret	Ret	Ret			Ret	9
6	(Japan) Marlboro Mitsubishi Ralliart	9		7			Ret				7			Ret	8	Ret	9
Pos.	Manufacturer	No.	MON (Monaco)	SWE (Sweden)	FRA (France)	ESP (Spain)	CYP (Cyprus)	ARG (Argentina)	GRE (Greece)	KEN (Kenya)	FIN (Finland)	GER (Germany)	ITA (Italy)	NZL (New Zealand)	AUS (Australia)	GBR (United Kingdom)	Points

Key
Colour	Result
Gold	Winner
Silver	2nd place
Bronze	3rd place
Green	Points finish
Blue	Non-points finish
Blue	Non-classified finish (NC)
Purple	Did not finish (Ret)
Black	Excluded (EX)
Black	Disqualified (DSQ)
White	Did not start (DNS)
White	Cancelled (C)
Blank	Withdrew entry from the event (WD)

=== JWRC Drivers' championship ===
Pos.	Driver	MON (Monaco)	ESP (Spain)	GRE (Greece)	GER (Germany)	ITA (Italy)	GBR (United Kingdom)	Pts
1	(Spain) Dani Solà	Ret	1	4	1	3	1	37
2	(Italy) Andrea Dallavilla	Ret	2	2	2	1	6	29
3	(Finland) Janne Tuohino	Ret	5	1	Ret	10	4	15
4	(Italy) Giandomenico Basso	Ret	3	Ret	7	2	3	14
5	(Italy) Nicola Caldani	2	Ret	3	Ret	4		13
6	(Belgium) François Duval	1	6	Ret	Ret	6	Ret	12
7	(United Kingdom) Niall McShea	Ret	Ret	Ret	Ret	11	2	6
8	(Germany) Niki Schelle	6	8	Ret	3	7	Ret	5
9	(Italy) Gianluigi Galli		4	Ret	Ret	5		5
10	(Lebanon) Roger Feghali	3	Ret	Ret	Ret	8		4
11	(United Kingdom) Martin Rowe	Ret	10	5	5	Ret	Ret	4
12	(Sweden) Daniel Carlsson	4	Ret	Ret	Ret	Ret	Ret	3
13	(San Marino) Mirco Baldacci	Ret	Ret	Ret	4	13	Ret	3
14	(Austria) David Doppelreiter	5	9		Ret	Ret		2
15	(Finland) Jussi Välimäki	Ret	Ret	Ret	Ret	9	5	2
16	(Norway) Alexander Foss	7	Ret	6	Ret		Ret	1
17	(Finland) Kosti Katajamäki	Ret	Ret	Ret	6	Ret	Ret	1
Pos.	Driver	MON (Monaco)	ESP (Spain)	GRE (Greece)	GER (Germany)	ITA (Italy)	GBR (United Kingdom)	Pts

Key
Colour	Result
Gold	Winner
Silver	2nd place
Bronze	3rd place
Green	Points finish
Blue	Non-points finish
Blue	Non-classified finish (NC)
Purple	Did not finish (Ret)
Black	Excluded (EX)
Black	Disqualified (DSQ)
White	Did not start (DNS)
White	Cancelled (C)
Blank	Withdrew entry from the event (WD)

=== PWRC Drivers' championship ===
Pos.	Driver	SWE (Sweden)	FRA (France)	CYP (Cyprus)	ARG (Argentina)	KEN (Kenya)	FIN (Finland)	NZL (New Zealand)	AUS (Australia)	Pts
1	(Malaysia) Karamjit Singh			1	3	1	3	Ret	3	32
2	(Finland) Kristian Sohlberg	1	Ret	Ret			2	1	Ret	26
3	(Peru) Ramón Ferreyros		1	Ret	1		Ret	Ret	3	23
4	(Japan) Toshihiro Arai	2		Ret	2	Ret		Ret	1	22
5	(Italy) Alex Fiorio	4		Ret		Ret	1	4	2	22
6	(United Kingdom) Martin Rowe	6	3	Ret			Ret	2	5	13
7	(Uruguay) Gustavo Trelles	Ret	4	2	4					12
8	(Bulgaria) Dimitar Iliev	7	2	4			Ret	Ret		9
9	(Norway) Bernt Kollevold	8	8	6			5	6	6	5
10	(Finland) Marko Ipatti	3					Ret			4
11	(Italy) Luca Baldini		9	3	Ret			Ret		4
12	(Italy) Giovanni Manfrinato		Ret	Ret	Ret		Ret	3	Ret	4
13	(Lithuania) Saulius Girdauskas	5		5						4
14	(Argentina) Marcos Ligato			Ret	5	Ret	Ret	5	Ret	4
15	(Italy) Alfredo De Dominicis		Ret	Ret			4	Ret	7	3
16	(Austria) Beppo Harrach		5	8	Ret		Ret	Ret	Ret	2
17	(Italy) Stefano Marrini		6	Ret	6	Ret		Ret	8	1
Pos.	Driver	SWE (Sweden)	FRA (France)	CYP (Cyprus)	ARG (Argentina)	KEN (Kenya)	FIN (Finland)	NZL (New Zealand)	AUS (Australia)	Pts

Key
Colour	Result
Gold	Winner
Silver	2nd place
Bronze	3rd place
Green	Points finish
Blue	Non-points finish
Blue	Non-classified finish (NC)
Purple	Did not finish (Ret)
Black	Excluded (EX)
Black	Disqualified (DSQ)
White	Did not start (DNS)
White	Cancelled (C)
Blank	Withdrew entry from the event (WD)

== Events ==
Round	Rally Name	Start-End Date	Podium Drivers (Finishing Time)	Podium Cars
1	(Monaco) Monte Carlo Rally	18 January–20 January	1. (Finland) Tommi Mäkinen (3h:59m:30.7s); 2. (France) Sébastien Loeb (4h:00m:44.8s); 3. (Spain) Carlos Sainz (4h:00m:46.4s)	1. Subaru Impreza WRC2001; 2. Citroën Xsara WRC; 3. Ford Focus RS WRC 02
2	(Sweden) Swedish Rally	1 February–3 February	1. (Finland) Marcus Grönholm (3h:07m:28.6s); 2. (Finland) Harri Rovanperä (3h:08m:53.1s); 3. (Spain) Carlos Sainz (3h:09m:54.4s)	1. Peugeot 206 WRC; 2. Peugeot 206 WRC; 3. Ford Focus RS WRC 02
3	(France) Tour de Corse	8 March–10 March	1. (France) Gilles Panizzi (3h:54m:40.3s); 2. (Finland) Marcus Grönholm (3h:55m:20.8s); 3. (United Kingdom) Richard Burns (3h:55m:32.7s)	1. Peugeot 206 WRC; 2. Peugeot 206 WRC; 3. Peugeot 206 WRC
4	(Spain) Rally Catalunya	22 March–24 March	1. (France) Gilles Panizzi (3h:34m:09.0s); 2. (United Kingdom) Richard Burns (3h:34m:46.3s); 3. (France) Philippe Bugalski (3h:35m:22.5s)	1. Peugeot 206 WRC; 2. Peugeot 206 WRC; 3. Citroën Xsara WRC
5	Cyprus Rally	19 April–21 April	1. (Finland) Marcus Grönholm (4h:21m:25.7s); 2. (United Kingdom) Richard Burns (4h:22m:22.5s); 3. (Finland) Tommi Mäkinen (4h:22m:24.7s)	1. Peugeot 206 WRC; 2. Peugeot 206 WRC; 3. Subaru Impreza WRC2002
6	Rally Argentina	17 May–19 May	1. (Spain) Carlos Sainz (4h:08m:12.1s); 2. (Norway) Petter Solberg (4h:08m:16.1s); 3. (United Kingdom) Colin McRae (4h:10m:31.2s)	1. Ford Focus RS WRC 02; 2. Subaru Impreza WRC2002; 3. Ford Focus RS WRC 02
7	(Greece) Acropolis Rally	14 June–16 June	1. (United Kingdom) Colin McRae (4h:27m:43.8s); 2. (Finland) Marcus Grönholm (4h:28m:08.3s); 3. (Spain) Carlos Sainz (4h:29m:29.4s)	1. Ford Focus RS WRC 02; 2. Peugeot 206 WRC; 3. Ford Focus RS WRC 02
8	(Kenya) Safari Rally	12 July–14 July	1. (United Kingdom) Colin McRae (7h:58m:28.0s); 2. (Finland) Harri Rovanperä (8h:01m:18.9s); 3. (Sweden) Thomas Rådström (8h:17m:06.6s)	1. Ford Focus RS WRC 02; 2. Peugeot 206 WRC; 3. Citroën Xsara WRC
9	Rally Finland	8 August–11 August	1. (Finland) Marcus Grönholm (3h:17m:52.5s); 2. (United Kingdom) Richard Burns (3h:19m:19.8s); 3. (Norway) Petter Solberg (3h:20m:42.1s)	1. Peugeot 206 WRC; 2. Peugeot 206 WRC; 3. Subaru Impreza WRC2002
10	(Germany) Rallye Deutschland	23 August–25 August	1. (France) Sébastien Loeb (3h:47m:17.3s); 2. (United Kingdom) Richard Burns (3h:47m:31.6s); 3. (Finland) Marcus Grönholm (3h:48m:36.4s)	1. Citroën Xsara WRC; 2. Peugeot 206 WRC; 3. Peugeot 206 WRC
11	(Italy) Rallye Sanremo	20 September–22 September	1. (France) Gilles Panizzi (4h:10m:15.6s); 2. (Finland) Marcus Grönholm (4h:10m:36.5s); 3. (Norway) Petter Solberg (4h:11m:22.0s)	1. Peugeot 206 WRC; 2. Peugeot 206 WRC; 3. Subaru Impreza WRC2002
12	Rally New Zealand	4 October–6 October	1. (Finland) Marcus Grönholm (3h:58m:45.4s); 2. (Finland) Harri Rovanperä (4h:02m:33.0s); 3. (Finland) Tommi Mäkinen (4h:03m:11.7s)	1. Peugeot 206 WRC; 2. Peugeot 206 WRC; 3. Subaru Impreza WRC2002
13	Rally Australia	31 October–3 November	1. (Finland) Marcus Grönholm (3h:35m:56.5s); 2. (Finland) Harri Rovanperä (3h:36m:53.8s); 3. (Norway) Petter Solberg (3h:37m:25.2s)	1. Peugeot 206 WRC; 2. Peugeot 206 WRC; 3. Subaru Impreza WRC2002
14	(United Kingdom) Rally of Great Britain	14 November–17 November	1. (Norway) Petter Solberg (3h:30m:36.4s); 2. (Estonia) Markko Märtin (3h:31m:00.8s); 3. (Spain) Carlos Sainz (3h:32m:12.1s)	1. Subaru Impreza WRC2002; 2. Ford Focus RS WRC 02; 3. Ford Focus RS WRC 02
