= 2002 Acropolis Rally =

7th round of the 2002 World Rally Championship

2002 Acropolis Rally 49th Acropolis Rally
Round 7 of the 2002 World Rally Championship season
← Previous event	Next event →
- Host country: Greece
- Rally base: Lamia
- Dates run: June 14, 2002 – June 16, 2002
- Stages: 16 (391.50 km; 243.27 miles)
- Stage surface: Gravel
- Overall distance: 1,180.51 km (733.53 miles)

Statistics
- Crews: 84 at start, 35 at finish

Overall results
- Overall winner: (United Kingdom) Colin McRae (United Kingdom) Nicky Grist (United Kingdom) Ford Motor Co. Ltd. Ford Focus RS WRC '01

The 2002 Acropolis Rally (formally the 49th Acropolis Rally) was the seventh round of the 2002 World Rally Championship. The race was held over three days between 14 June and 16 June 2002, and was won by Ford's Colin McRae, his 24th win in the World Rally Championship.

== Background ==
=== Entry list ===
No.	Driver	Co-Driver	Entrant	Car	Tyre
World Rally Championship manufacturer entries
1	(United Kingdom) Richard Burns	(United Kingdom) Robert Reid	(France) Peugeot Total	Peugeot 206 WRC	MI
2	(Finland) Marcus Grönholm	(Finland) Timo Rautiainen	(France) Peugeot Total	Peugeot 206 WRC	MI
3	(Finland) Harri Rovanperä	(Finland) Risto Pietiläinen	(France) Peugeot Total	Peugeot 206 WRC	MI
4	(Spain) Carlos Sainz	(Spain) Luis Moya	(United Kingdom) Ford Motor Co. Ltd.	Ford Focus RS WRC '02	P
5	(United Kingdom) Colin McRae	(United Kingdom) Nicky Grist	(United Kingdom) Ford Motor Co. Ltd.	Ford Focus RS WRC '01	P
6	(Estonia) Markko Märtin	(United Kingdom) Michael Park	(United Kingdom) Ford Motor Co. Ltd.	Ford Focus RS WRC '02	P
7	(France) François Delecour	(France) Daniel Grataloup	(Japan) Marlboro Mitsubishi Ralliart	Mitsubishi Lancer WRC	MI
8	(United Kingdom) Alister McRae	(United Kingdom) David Senior	(Japan) Marlboro Mitsubishi Ralliart	Mitsubishi Lancer WRC	MI
10	(Finland) Tommi Mäkinen	(Finland) Kaj Lindström	(Japan) 555 Subaru World Rally Team	Subaru Impreza S7 WRC '01	P
11	(Norway) Petter Solberg	(United Kingdom) Phil Mills	(Japan) 555 Subaru World Rally Team	Subaru Impreza S8 WRC '02	P
12	(Japan) Toshihiro Arai	(New Zealand) Tony Sircombe	(Japan) 555 Subaru World Rally Team	Subaru Impreza S7 WRC '01	P
14	(Sweden) Kenneth Eriksson	(Sweden) Tina Thörner	(Czech Republic) Škoda Motorsport	Škoda Octavia WRC Evo2	MI
15	(Finland) Toni Gardemeister	(Finland) Paavo Lukander	(Czech Republic) Škoda Motorsport	Škoda Octavia WRC Evo2	MI
16	(Sweden) Stig Blomqvist	(Venezuela) Ana Goñi	(Czech Republic) Škoda Motorsport	Škoda Octavia WRC Evo2	MI
17	(Germany) Armin Schwarz	(Germany) Manfred Hiemer	(South Korea) Hyundai Castrol World Rally Team	Hyundai Accent WRC3	MI
18	(Belgium) Freddy Loix	(Belgium) Sven Smeets	(South Korea) Hyundai Castrol World Rally Team	Hyundai Accent WRC3	MI
19	(Finland) Juha Kankkunen	(Finland) Juha Repo	(South Korea) Hyundai Castrol World Rally Team	Hyundai Accent WRC3	MI
World Rally Championship entries
20	(Sweden) Thomas Rådström	(France) Denis Giraudet	(France) Automobiles Citroën	Citroën Xsara WRC	MI
21	(France) Sébastien Loeb	(Monaco) Daniel Elena	(France) Automobiles Citroën	Citroën Xsara WRC	MI
23	(France) Gilles Panizzi	(France) Hervé Panizzi	(France) Bozian Racing	Peugeot 206 WRC	MI
24	(Belgium) Bruno Thiry	(Belgium) Stéphane Prévot	(Belgium) Peugeot Bastos Racing	Peugeot 206 WRC	—N/a
25	(Germany) Armin Kremer	(Germany) Dieter Schneppenheim	(Germany) Armin Kremer	Ford Focus RS WRC '01	—N/a
25	(Greece) Ioannis Papadimitriou	(United Kingdom) Allan Harryman	(Greece) Ioannis Papadimitriou	Ford Focus RS WRC '01	—N/a
32	(Argentina) Gabriel Pozzo	(Argentina) Daniel Stillo	(Argentina) Gabriel Pozzo	Škoda Octavia WRC	—N/a
33	(Greece) Armodios Vovos	(Greece) Loris Meletopoulos	(Greece) Armodios Vovos	Ford Focus RS WRC '01	—N/a
34	(Poland) Tomasz Kuchar	(Poland) Maciej Szczepaniak	(Poland) Tomasz Kuchar	Toyota Corolla WRC	MI
35	(Saudi Arabia) Abdullah Bakhashab	(United Kingdom) Bobby Willis	Marlboro Rally Team Saudi Arabia	Toyota Corolla WRC	MI
105	(Italy) Giovanni Recordati	(Monaco) Freddy Delorme	(Italy) Giovanni Recordati	Toyota Corolla WRC	—N/a
106	(United Kingdom) Natalie Barratt	(United Kingdom) Roger Freeman	(United Kingdom) Natalie Barratt Rallysport	Hyundai Accent WRC	—N/a
107	(Italy) Riccardo Errani	(Italy) Stefano Casadio	(Italy) Riccardo Errani	Subaru Impreza 555	—N/a
108	(United Kingdom) Nigel Heath	(United Kingdom) Steve Lancaster	(United Kingdom) Nigel Heath	Subaru Impreza S5 WRC '99	—N/a
115	(Greece) Sotiris Hatzitsopanis	(Greece) Nikos Kosmas	(Greece) Sotiris Hatzitsopanis	Subaru Impreza WRX	—N/a
JWRC entries
51	(Italy) Andrea Dallavilla	(Italy) Giovanni Bernacchini	(Italy) Vieffe Corse SRL	Citroën Saxo S1600	MI
52	(United Kingdom) Niall McShea	(United Kingdom) Michael Orr	(Germany) Opel Motorsport	Opel Corsa S1600	MI
53	(Italy) Giandomenico Basso	(Italy) Luigi Pirollo	(Italy) Top Run SRL	Fiat Punto S1600	MI
54	(Norway) Martin Stenshorne	(United Kingdom) Clive Jenkins	(Germany) Opel Motorsport	Opel Corsa S1600	MI
55	(Belgium) François Duval	(Belgium) Jean-Marc Fortin	(United Kingdom) Ford Motor Co. Ltd.	Ford Puma S1600	MI
56	(Finland) Jussi Välimäki	(Finland) Tero Gardemeister	(France) Citroën Sport	Citroën Saxo S1600	MI
57	(Paraguay) Alejandro Galanti	(Spain) Xavier Amigó	(Italy) Astra Racing	Ford Puma S1600	MI
58	(Italy) Christian Chemin	(Italy) Simone Scattolin	(Italy) Hawk Racing Club	Fiat Punto S1600	MI
59	(Finland) Juha Kangas	(Finland) Jani Laaksonen	(Japan) Suzuki Sport	Suzuki Ignis S1600	MI
60	(Italy) Nicola Caldani	(Italy) Dario D'Esposito	(Italy) Procar Rally Team	Fiat Punto S1600	MI
61	(United Kingdom) Gwyndaf Evans	(United Kingdom) Chris Patterson	(United Kingdom) MG Sport & Racing	MG ZR S1600	P
62	(Finland) Janne Tuohino	(Finland) Petri Vihavainen	(France) Citroën Sport	Citroën Saxo S1600	MI
63	(United Kingdom) Martin Rowe	(United Kingdom) Chris Wood	(Italy) Astra Racing	Ford Puma S1600	MI
64	(Italy) Gianluigi Galli	(Italy) Guido D'Amore	(Italy) Top Run SRL	Fiat Punto S1600	MI
65	(Spain) Daniel Solà	(Spain) Álex Romaní	(France) Citroën Sport	Citroën Saxo S1600	MI
66	(San Marino) Mirco Baldacci	(Italy) Maurizio Barone	(Italy) Vieffe Corse SRL	Citroën Saxo S1600	MI
67	(Sweden) Daniel Carlsson	(Sweden) Mattias Andersson	(Italy) Astra Racing	Ford Puma S1600	MI
68	(Germany) Nikolaus Schelle	(Germany) Gerhard Weiss	(Japan) Suzuki Sport	Suzuki Ignis S1600	MI
69	(Finland) Kosti Katajamäki	(Finland) Jakke Honkanen	(Germany) Volkswagen Racing	Volkswagen Polo S1600	MI
73	(Andorra) Albert Lloverá	(Spain) Marc Corral	(Spain) Pronto Racing	Fiat Punto S1600	MI
75	(Japan) Kazuhiko Niwa	(Japan) Tatsuya Ideue	(Japan) Suzuki Sport	Suzuki Ignis S1600	MI
76	(Norway) Alexander Foss	(Norway) Cato Menkerud	(United Kingdom) Ford Motor Co. Ltd.	Ford Puma S1600	MI
78	(Lebanon) Roger Feghali	(Italy) Nicola Arena	(Italy) Astra Racing	Ford Puma S1600	MI

=== Itinerary ===
All dates and times are EEST (UTC+3).

Date	Time	No.	Stage name	Distance
Leg 1 — 136.35 km
14 June	09:07	SS1	Pavliani 1	24.45 km
14 June	10:40	SS2	Karoutes 1	18.89 km
14 June	12:36	SS3	Paleohori	20.52 km
14 June	13:29	SS4	Rengini	25.04 km
14 June	15:52	SS5	Inohori 1	23.00 km
14 June	16:40	SS6	Pavliani 2	24.45 km
Leg 2 — 158.76 km
15 June	08:35	SS7	Bauxites 1	23.45 km
15 June	09:58	SS8	Drosohori 1	28.68 km
15 June	11:56	SS9	Elatia 1	37.16 km
15 June	13:09	SS10	Mendenitsa 1	17.34 km
15 June	15:34	SS11	Bauxites 2	23.45 km
15 June	16:57	SS12	Drosohori 2	28.68 km
Leg 3 — 96.39 km
16 June	08:58	SS13	Inohori 2	23.00 km
16 June	10:16	SS14	Karoutes 2	18.89 km
16 June	12:49	SS15	Elatia 2	37.16 km
16 June	14:02	SS16	Mendenitsa 2	17.34 km

== Results ==
=== Overall ===
Pos.	No.	Driver	Co-driver	Team	Car	Time	Difference	Points
1	5	(United Kingdom) Colin McRae	(United Kingdom) Nicky Grist	(United Kingdom) Ford Motor Co. Ltd.	Ford Focus RS WRC '01	4:27:43.8		10
2	2	(Finland) Marcus Grönholm	(Finland) Timo Rautiainen	(France) Peugeot Total	Peugeot 206 WRC	4:28:08.3	+24.5	6
3	4	(Spain) Carlos Sainz	(Spain) Luis Moya	(United Kingdom) Ford Motor Co. Ltd.	Ford Focus RS WRC '02	4:29:29.4	+1:45.6	4
4	3	(Finland) Harri Rovanperä	(Finland) Risto Pietiläinen	(France) Peugeot Total	Peugeot 206 WRC	4:29:41.4	+1:57.6	3
5	11	(Norway) Petter Solberg	(United Kingdom) Phil Mills	(Japan) 555 Subaru World Rally Team	Subaru Impreza S8 WRC '02	4:29:42.4	+1:58.6	2
6	6	(Estonia) Markko Märtin	(United Kingdom) Michael Park	(United Kingdom) Ford Motor Co. Ltd.	Ford Focus RS WRC '02	4:30:23.9	+2:40.1	1

=== World Rally Cars ===
==== Classification ====
Position		No.	Driver	Co-driver	Entrant	Car	Time	Difference	Points
Event	Class	No.	Driver	Co-driver	Entrant	Car	Time	Difference	Points
1	1	5	(United Kingdom) Colin McRae	(United Kingdom) Nicky Grist	(United Kingdom) Ford Motor Co. Ltd.	Ford Focus RS WRC '01	4:27:43.8		10
2	2	2	(Finland) Marcus Grönholm	(Finland) Timo Rautiainen	(France) Peugeot Total	Peugeot 206 WRC	4:28:08.3	+24.5	6
3	3	4	(Spain) Carlos Sainz	(Spain) Luis Moya	(United Kingdom) Ford Motor Co. Ltd.	Ford Focus RS WRC '02	4:29:29.4	+1:45.6	4
4	4	3	(Finland) Harri Rovanperä	(Finland) Risto Pietiläinen	(France) Peugeot Total	Peugeot 206 WRC	4:29:41.4	+1:57.6	3
5	5	11	(Norway) Petter Solberg	(United Kingdom) Phil Mills	(Japan) 555 Subaru World Rally Team	Subaru Impreza S8 WRC '02	4:29:42.4	+1:58.6	2
6	6	6	(Estonia) Markko Märtin	(United Kingdom) Michael Park	(United Kingdom) Ford Motor Co. Ltd.	Ford Focus RS WRC '02	4:30:23.9	+2:40.1	1
9	7	17	(Germany) Armin Schwarz	(Germany) Manfred Hiemer	(South Korea) Hyundai Castrol World Rally Team	Hyundai Accent WRC3	4:33:24.8	+5:41.0	0
10	8	15	(Finland) Toni Gardemeister	(Finland) Paavo Lukander	(Czech Republic) Škoda Motorsport	Škoda Octavia WRC Evo2	4:35:01.2	+7:17.4	0
11	9	7	(France) François Delecour	(France) Daniel Grataloup	(Japan) Marlboro Mitsubishi Ralliart	Mitsubishi Lancer WRC	4:35:05.4	+7:21.6	0
13	10	12	(Japan) Toshihiro Arai	(New Zealand) Tony Sircombe	(Japan) 555 Subaru World Rally Team	Subaru Impreza S7 WRC '01	4:38:30.2	+10:46.4	0
14	11	14	(Sweden) Kenneth Eriksson	(Sweden) Tina Thörner	(Czech Republic) Škoda Motorsport	Škoda Octavia WRC Evo2	4:39:22.6	+11:38.8	0
17	12	16	(Sweden) Stig Blomqvist	(Venezuela) Ana Goñi	(Czech Republic) Škoda Motorsport	Škoda Octavia WRC Evo2	4:47:25.2	+19:41.4	0
Retired SS14		18	(Belgium) Freddy Loix	(Belgium) Sven Smeets	(South Korea) Hyundai Castrol World Rally Team	Hyundai Accent WRC3	Engine		0
Retired SS13		1	(United Kingdom) Richard Burns	(United Kingdom) Robert Reid	(France) Peugeot Total	Peugeot 206 WRC	Engine		0
Retired SS13		8	(United Kingdom) Alister McRae	(United Kingdom) David Senior	(Japan) Marlboro Mitsubishi Ralliart	Mitsubishi Lancer WRC	Engine		0
Retired SS8		19	(Finland) Juha Kankkunen	(Finland) Juha Repo	(South Korea) Hyundai Castrol World Rally Team	Hyundai Accent WRC3	Engine		0
Retired SS6		10	(Finland) Tommi Mäkinen	(Finland) Kaj Lindström	(Japan) 555 Subaru World Rally Team	Subaru Impreza S7 WRC '01	Engine		0

==== Special stages ====
Day	Stage	Stage name	Length	Winner	Car	Time	Class leaders
Leg 1 (14 Jun)	SS1	Pavliani 1	24.45 km	(Estonia) Markko Märtin	Ford Focus RS WRC '02	19:32.1	(Estonia) Markko Märtin
Leg 1 (14 Jun)	SS2	Karoutes 1	18.89 km	(Sweden) Thomas Rådström	Citroën Xsara WRC	11:56.5	(Estonia) Markko Märtin
Leg 1 (14 Jun)	SS3	Paleohori	20.52 km	(Belgium) Freddy Loix	Hyundai Accent WRC3	13:54.9	(Estonia) Markko Märtin
Leg 1 (14 Jun)	SS4	Rengini	25.04 km	(Estonia) Markko Märtin	Ford Focus RS WRC '02	19:38.1	(Estonia) Markko Märtin
Leg 1 (14 Jun)	SS5	Inohori 1	23.00 km	(Estonia) Markko Märtin	Ford Focus RS WRC '02	18:04.8	(Estonia) Markko Märtin
Leg 1 (14 Jun)	SS6	Pavliani 2	24.45 km	(Norway) Petter Solberg	Subaru Impreza S8 WRC '02	19:37.4	(Estonia) Markko Märtin
Leg 2 (15 Jun)	SS7	Bauxites 1	23.45 km	(Norway) Petter Solberg	Subaru Impreza S8 WRC '02	14:00.4	(Estonia) Markko Märtin
Leg 2 (15 Jun)	SS8	Drosohori 1	28.68 km	(Estonia) Markko Märtin	Ford Focus RS WRC '02	23:27.2	(Estonia) Markko Märtin
Leg 2 (15 Jun)	SS9	Elatia 1	37.16 km	(United Kingdom) Richard Burns	Peugeot 206 WRC	24:12.6	(United Kingdom) Colin McRae
Leg 2 (15 Jun)	SS10	Mendenitsa 1	17.34 km	Stage cancelled			(United Kingdom) Colin McRae
Leg 2 (15 Jun)	SS11	Bauxites 2	23.45 km	(Norway) Petter Solberg	Subaru Impreza S8 WRC '02	13:44.8	(United Kingdom) Colin McRae
Leg 2 (15 Jun)	SS12	Drosohori 2	28.68 km	(Estonia) Markko Märtin	Ford Focus RS WRC '02	23:07.8	(United Kingdom) Colin McRae
Leg 3 (16 Jun)	SS13	Inohori 2	23.00 km	(Finland) Marcus Grönholm	Peugeot 206 WRC	17:35.2	(United Kingdom) Colin McRae
Leg 3 (16 Jun)	SS14	Karoutes 2	18.89 km	(Finland) Marcus Grönholm	Peugeot 206 WRC	11:39.9	(United Kingdom) Colin McRae
Leg 3 (16 Jun)	SS15	Elatia 2	37.16 km	(Finland) Marcus Grönholm	Peugeot 206 WRC	23:59.9	(United Kingdom) Colin McRae
Leg 3 (16 Jun)	SS16	Mendenitsa 2	17.34 km	(Finland) Harri Rovanperä	Peugeot 206 WRC	11:04.0	(United Kingdom) Colin McRae

==== Championship standings ====
Pos.	Drivers' championships			Co-drivers' championships			Manufacturers' championships		
Pos.	Move	Driver	Points	Move	Co-driver	Points	Move	Manufacturer	Points
1		(Finland) Marcus Grönholm	37		(Finland) Timo Rautiainen	37		(France) Peugeot Total	77
2	1	(Spain) Carlos Sainz	23	1	(Spain) Luis Moya	23		(United Kingdom) Ford Motor Co. Ltd.	55
3	1	(France) Gilles Panizzi	20	1	(France) Hervé Panizzi	20		(Japan) 555 Subaru World Rally Team	35
4	3	(United Kingdom) Colin McRae	20	3	(United Kingdom) Nicky Grist	20		(Japan) Marlboro Mitsubishi Ralliart	6
5	1	(United Kingdom) Richard Burns	19	1	(United Kingdom) Robert Reid	19		(Czech Republic) Škoda Motorsport	5

=== Junior World Rally Championship ===
==== Classification ====
Position		No.	Driver	Co-driver	Entrant	Car	Time	Difference	Points
Event	Class	No.	Driver	Co-driver	Entrant	Car	Time	Difference	Points
19	1	62	(Finland) Janne Tuohino	(Finland) Petri Vihavainen	(France) Citroën Sport	Citroën Saxo S1600	5:04:27.8		10
20	2	51	(Italy) Andrea Dallavilla	(Italy) Giovanni Bernacchini	(Italy) Vieffe Corse SRL	Citroën Saxo S1600	5:05:51.1	+1:23.3	6
21	3	60	(Italy) Nicola Caldani	(Italy) Dario D'Esposito	(Italy) Procar Rally Team	Fiat Punto S1600	5:07:13.7	+2:45.9	4
23	4	65	(Spain) Daniel Solà	(Spain) Álex Romaní	(France) Citroën Sport	Citroën Saxo S1600	5:08:08.5	+3:40.7	3
24	5	63	(United Kingdom) Martin Rowe	(United Kingdom) Chris Wood	(Italy) Astra Racing	Ford Puma S1600	5:09:50.8	+5:23.0	2
30	6	76	(Norway) Alexander Foss	(Norway) Cato Menkerud	(United Kingdom) Ford Motor Co. Ltd.	Ford Puma S1600	5:38:40.2	+34:12.4	1
Retired SS14		56	(Finland) Jussi Välimäki	(Finland) Tero Gardemeister	(France) Citroën Sport	Citroën Saxo S1600	Engine		0
Retired SS14		57	(Paraguay) Alejandro Galanti	(Spain) Xavier Amigó	(Italy) Astra Racing	Ford Puma S1600	Accident		0
Retired SS8		55	(Belgium) François Duval	(Belgium) Jean-Marc Fortin	(United Kingdom) Ford Motor Co. Ltd.	Ford Puma S1600	Accident		0
Retired SS8		58	(Italy) Christian Chemin	(Italy) Simone Scattolin	(Italy) Hawk Racing Club	Fiat Punto S1600	Accident		0
Retired SS7		61	(United Kingdom) Gwyndaf Evans	(United Kingdom) Chris Patterson	(United Kingdom) MG Sport & Racing	MG ZR S1600	Engine		0
Retired SS7		69	(Finland) Kosti Katajamäki	(Finland) Jakke Honkanen	(Germany) Volkswagen Racing	Volkswagen Polo S1600	Clutch		0
Retired SS6		54	(Norway) Martin Stenshorne	(United Kingdom) Clive Jenkins	(Germany) Opel Motorsport	Opel Corsa S1600	Retired		0
Retired SS6		68	(Germany) Nikolaus Schelle	(Germany) Gerhard Weiss	(Japan) Suzuki Sport	Suzuki Ignis S1600	Transmission		0
Retired SS6		75	(Japan) Kazuhiko Niwa	(Japan) Tatsuya Ideue	(Japan) Suzuki Sport	Suzuki Ignis S1600	Accident		0
Retired SS5		52	(United Kingdom) Niall McShea	(United Kingdom) Michael Orr	(Germany) Opel Motorsport	Opel Corsa S1600	Oil sump		0
Retired SS5		66	(San Marino) Mirco Baldacci	(Italy) Maurizio Barone	(Italy) Vieffe Corse SRL	Citroën Saxo S1600	Suspension		0
Retired SS5		73	(Andorra) Albert Lloverá	(Spain) Marc Corral	(Spain) Pronto Racing	Fiat Punto S1600	Overheated engine		0
Retired SS4		67	(Sweden) Daniel Carlsson	(Sweden) Mattias Andersson	(Italy) Astra Racing	Ford Puma S1600	Engine		0
Retired SS3		53	(Italy) Giandomenico Basso	(Italy) Luigi Pirollo	(Italy) Top Run SRL	Fiat Punto S1600	Radiator		0
Retired SS2		59	(Finland) Juha Kangas	(Finland) Jani Laaksonen	(Japan) Suzuki Sport	Suzuki Ignis S1600	Accident		0
Retired SS1		64	(Italy) Gianluigi Galli	(Italy) Guido D'Amore	(Italy) Top Run SRL	Fiat Punto S1600	Battery		0
Retired SS1		78	(Lebanon) Roger Feghali	(Italy) Nicola Arena	(Italy) Astra Racing	Ford Puma S1600	Radiator		0

==== Special stages ====
Day	Stage	Stage name	Length	Winner	Car	Time	Class leaders
Leg 1 (14 Jun)	SS1	Pavliani 1	24.45 km	(Belgium) François Duval	Ford Puma S1600	21:49.1	(Belgium) François Duval
Leg 1 (14 Jun)	SS2	Karoutes 1	18.89 km	(Sweden) Daniel Carlsson	Ford Puma S1600	13:09.3	(Belgium) François Duval
Leg 1 (14 Jun)	SS3	Paleohori	20.52 km	(Belgium) François Duval	Ford Puma S1600	15:54.3	(Belgium) François Duval
Leg 1 (14 Jun)	SS4	Rengini	25.04 km	(Belgium) François Duval	Ford Puma S1600	21:53.9	(Belgium) François Duval
Leg 1 (14 Jun)	SS5	Inohori 1	23.00 km	(Norway) Martin Stenshorne	Opel Corsa S1600	20:00.5	(Belgium) François Duval
Leg 1 (14 Jun)	SS6	Pavliani 2	24.45 km	(Belgium) François Duval	Ford Puma S1600	22:12.9	(Belgium) François Duval
Leg 2 (15 Jun)	SS7	Bauxites 1	23.45 km	(Spain) Daniel Solà	Citroën Saxo S1600	15:38.1	(Belgium) François Duval
Leg 2 (15 Jun)	SS8	Drosohori 1	28.68 km	(Finland) Janne Tuohino	Citroën Saxo S1600	25:51.9	(Finland) Jussi Välimäki
Leg 2 (15 Jun)	SS9	Elatia 1	37.16 km	(Finland) Janne Tuohino	Citroën Saxo S1600	27:49.0	(Finland) Janne Tuohino
Leg 2 (15 Jun)	SS10	Mendenitsa 1	17.34 km	Stage cancelled			(Finland) Janne Tuohino
Leg 2 (15 Jun)	SS11	Bauxites 2	23.45 km	(Spain) Daniel Solà	Citroën Saxo S1600	15:31.8	(Finland) Jussi Välimäki
Leg 2 (15 Jun)	SS12	Drosohori 2	28.68 km	(Finland) Jussi Välimäki	Citroën Saxo S1600	26:08.9	(Finland) Jussi Välimäki
Leg 3 (16 Jun)	SS13	Inohori 2	23.00 km	(Spain) Daniel Solà	Citroën Saxo S1600	19:40.6	(Finland) Janne Tuohino
Leg 3 (16 Jun)	SS14	Karoutes 2	18.89 km	(Italy) Nicola Caldani	Fiat Punto S1600	13:13.1	(Finland) Janne Tuohino
Leg 3 (16 Jun)	SS15	Elatia 2	37.16 km	(Italy) Nicola Caldani	Fiat Punto S1600	27:53.3	(Finland) Janne Tuohino
Leg 3 (16 Jun)	SS16	Mendenitsa 2	17.34 km	(Italy) Andrea Dallavilla	Citroën Saxo S1600	13:07.8	(Finland) Janne Tuohino

==== Championship standings ====
Pos.	Drivers' championships		
Pos.	Move	Driver	Points
1	1	(Spain) Daniel Solà	13
2	8	(Finland) Janne Tuohino	12
3	1	(Italy) Andrea Dallavilla	12
4	3	(Belgium) François Duval	11
5	2	(Italy) Nicola Caldani	10
