= Janne Tuohino =

Finnish rally driver (born 1975)

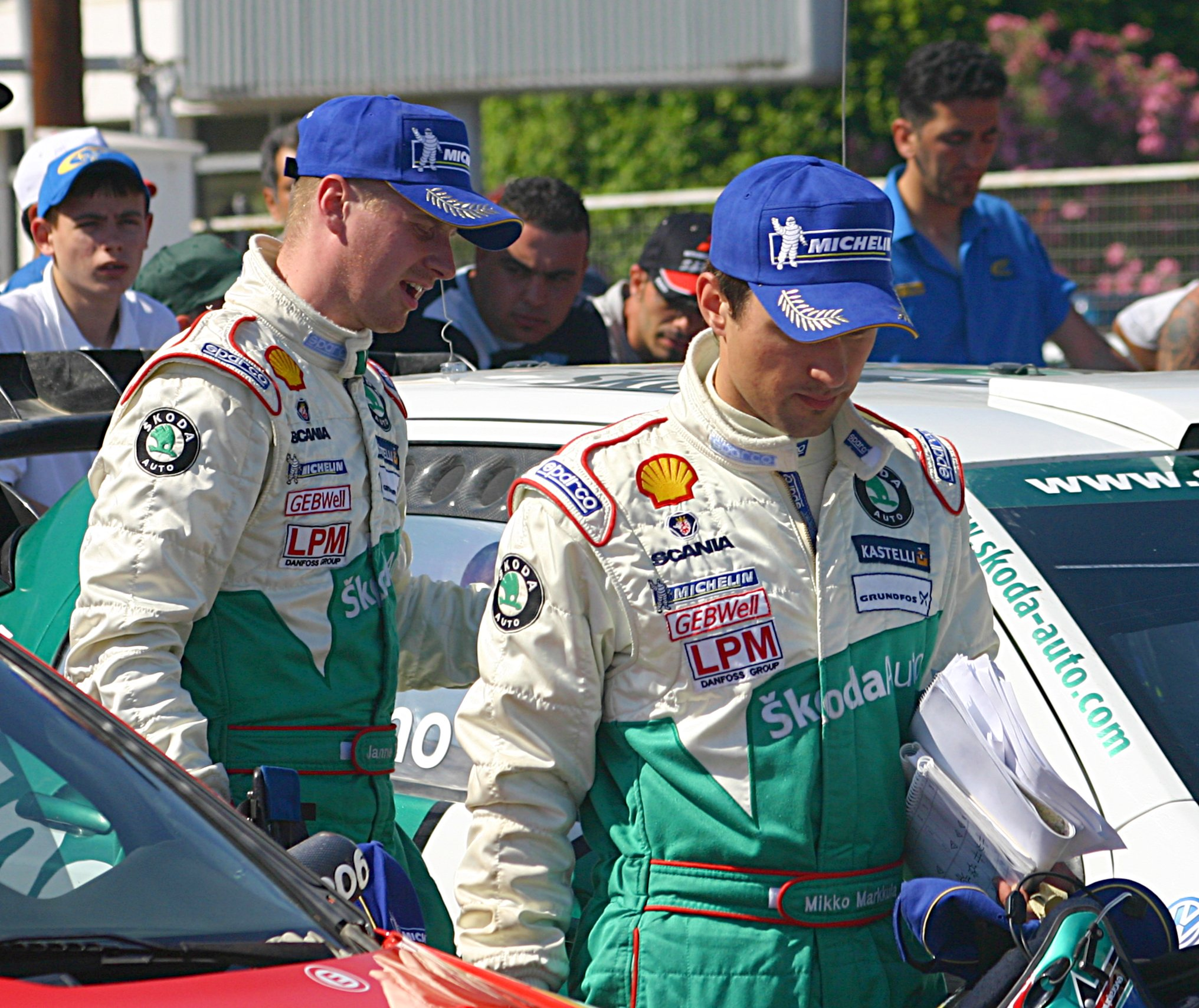
- Tuohino (on the left) at the 2005 Cyprus Rally.

Personal information
- Nationality: (Finland) Finnish
- Full name: Janne Tapio Tuohino
- Born: 22 May 1975 (age 51); Kiiminki, Finland

World Rally Championship record
- Years active: 1996–2006, 2009–2010, 2016, 2018–2019, 2021
- Co-driver: (Finland) Risto Pietiläinen (Finland) Harri Kiesi (Finland) Ilkka Riipinen (Finland) Miikka Anttila (Finland) Petri Vihavainen (Finland) Jukka Aho (Finland) Mikko Markkula (Finland) Markku Tuohino (Finland) Marko Sallinen (Finland) Reeta Hämäläinen
- Teams: Ford, Škoda
- Rallies: 50
- Championships: 0
- Rally wins: 0
- Podiums: 0
- Stage wins: 3
- Total points: 21
- First rally: 1996 Rally Finland
- Last rally: 2021 Arctic Rally

Janne Tapio Tuohino (born 22 May 1975) is a Finnish rally driver.

== Career ==
Tuohino began his rally career in 1993 when he entered a rally sprint in a Toyota Starlet. Although his first true rally was in January 1994, in which he drove a Ford Escort RS 2000. By the end of 1994 he was driving in Lancia Delta in which he competed most of his Finnish rallies. His father helped pay for the Lancia.

After receiving an international rally licence, Tuohino imported an Opel Kadett from Sweden. With his newly acquired licence he entered the Finnish Rally Championship. Near the end of the championship he replaced the Kadett with an Opel Astra.

In 1997, Tuohino turned to car manufacturer Mitsubishi and purchased a Mitsubishi Lancer Evolution Mk. III. With the aid of Mitsubishi, he became the Finnish Group N Champion, in 1999.

Tuohino then moved on to drive in a private Ford Escort WRC and in the end came 8th in the Rally Finland of 1999. In 2000, he had switched to Toyota and was rallying in a Corolla WRC.

In 2001, Tuohino became the Finnish Rally Champion and drove a Citroën Saxo in the Junior World Rally Championship. The final results put him 3rd in the Junior World Rally Championship since he was not always good on tarmac tracks. The next year, he placed 2nd in the Finnish Championship in a Ford Focus RS WRC 02 and took his first official World Rally Championship points.

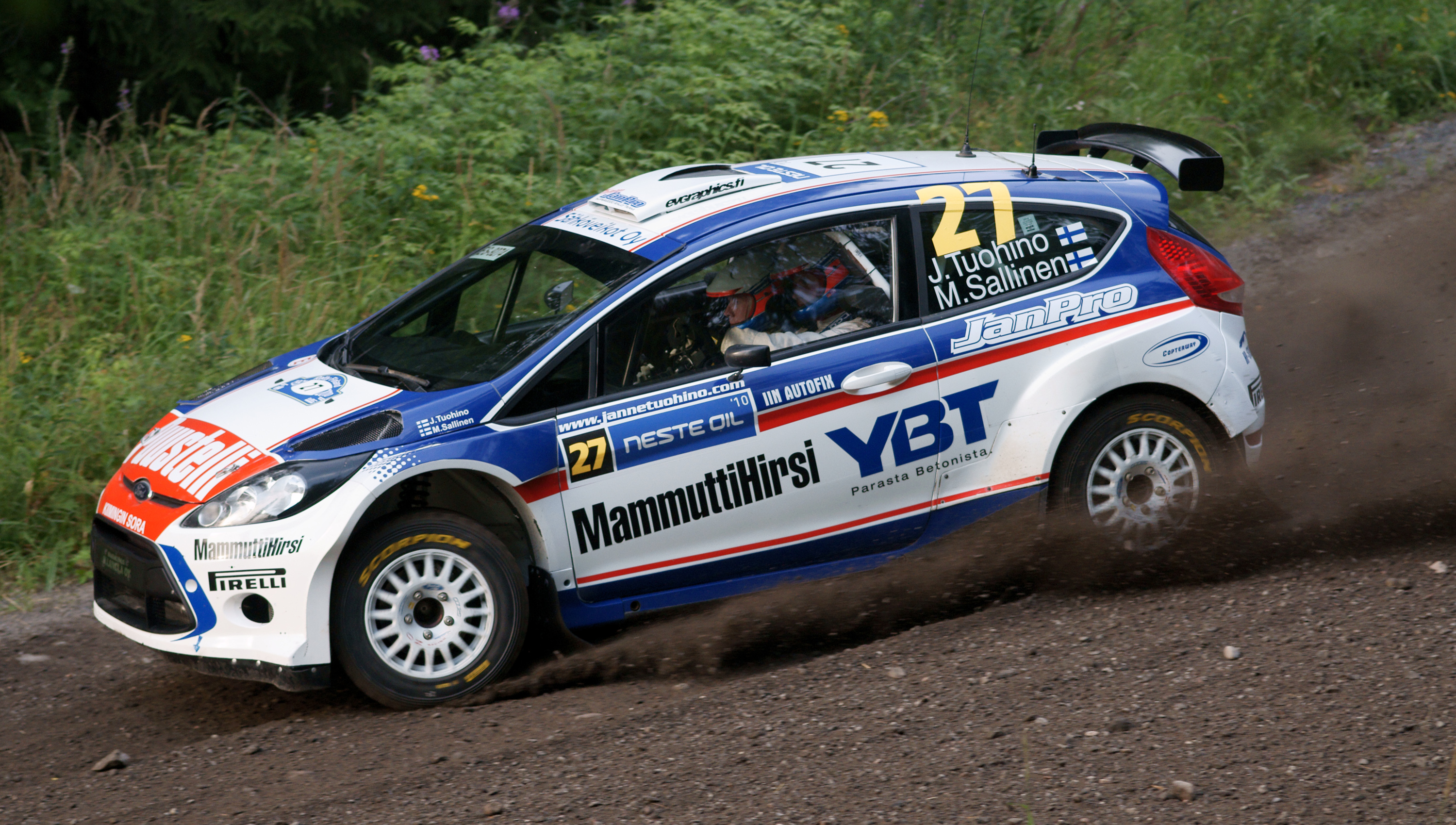
Tuohino driving a Ford Fiesta S2000 at the 2010 Rally Finland.

=== WRC career ===
In 2004, Tuohino continued to drive a Ford Focus RS WRC 03 car and, again, had a good year, scoring multiple points during the season. For 2005, he joined Škoda, and shared a drive with fellow Finn Jani Paasonen alongside team leader Armin Schwarz. However, the team folded at the end of the year, which left Tuohino without a drive for the next season.

=== Post-WRC ===
After 2006, Tuohino has taken part in a few WRC races and has returned to race on the Finnish Rally Championship.

== Complete WRC results ==
Year	Entrant	Car	1	2	3	4	5	6	7	8	9	10	11	12	13	14	15	16	WDC	Points
1996	Janne Tuohino	Opel Astra GSi 16v	SWE	KEN	IDN	GRC	ARG	FIN; Ret	AUS	ITA	ESP								NC	0
1997	Janne Tuohino	Mitsubishi Lancer Evo IV	MON	SWE	KEN	POR	ESP	FRA	ARG	GRC	NZL	FIN; Ret	IDN	ITA	AUS	GBR			NC	0
1998	Sawfish Racing	Volkswagen Golf Kit Car	MON	SWE	KEN	POR	ESP	FRA	ARG	GRC	NZL	FIN; Ret	ITA	AUS	GBR				NC	0
1999	LPM Human Heat	Ford Escort WRC	MON	SWE	KEN	POR	ESP	FRA	ARG	GRC	NZL	FIN; 8	CHN	ITA		GBR; Ret			NC	0
1999	Janne Tuohino	Volkswagen Polo 16v													AUS; Ret				NC	0
2000	Janne Tuohino	Toyota Corolla WRC	MON	SWE; 15	KEN	POR; Ret	ESP	ARG	GRC	NZL	FIN; Ret	CYP	FRA	ITA	AUS				NC	0
2000	LMP Group Ltd.	Toyota Corolla WRC														GBR; Ret			NC	0
2001	Janne Tuohino	Toyota Corolla WRC	MON	SWE; 11	POR	ESP; Ret	ARG	CYP	GRC	KEN	FIN; 11	NZL	ITA	FRA	AUS				NC	0
2001	LMP Group Ltd.	Toyota Corolla WRC														GBR; Ret			NC	0
2002	Janne Tuohino	Citroën Saxo S1600	MON; Ret			ESP; 24			GRC; 19	KEN		GER; Ret	ITA; 24	NZL	AUS	GBR; 25			NC	0
2002	Janne Tuohino	Ford Focus RS WRC 01		SWE; 7	FRA		CYP; 12	ARG											NC	0
2002	LPM Racing	Ford Focus RS WRC 01									FIN; 11								NC	0
2003	Janne Tuohino	Ford Focus RS WRC 02	MON	SWE; 17	TUR	NZL	ARG	GRC	CYP	GER	FIN; 7	AUS	ITA	FRA	ESP	GBR			20th	2
2004	Ford Motor Co. Ltd.	Ford Focus RS WRC 03	MON	SWE; 4	MEX	NZL													9th	16
2004	Janne Tuohino	Ford Focus RS WRC 02					CYP; 6	GRC; 7	TUR; 7	ARG				GBR; Ret	ITA	FRA	ESP	AUS	9th	16
2004	Ford Motor Co. Ltd.	Ford Focus RS WRC 04									FIN; 5	GER	JPN						9th	16
2005	Škoda Motorsport	Škoda Fabia WRC	MON	SWE; Ret	MEX	NZL; Ret	ITA; 13	CYP; 9	TUR; 13	GRC; Ret	ARG	FIN; 10	GER	GBR	JPN	FRA	ESP	AUS	NC	0
2006	Janne Tuohino	Citroën Xsara WRC	MON	SWE; 10	MEX	ESP	FRA	ARG	ITA	GRC	GER	FIN; 6	JPN	CYP	TUR	AUS	NZL	GBR	24th	3
2009	Janne Tuohino	Peugeot 207 S2000	IRE	NOR	CYP	POR	ARG	ITA	GRE	POL	FIN; EX	AUS	ESP	GBR					NC	0
2010	JanPro	Ford Fiesta S2000	SWE; 12	MEX	JOR; Ret	TUR	NZL; Ret	POR; 28	BUL	FIN; 17	GER	JPN	FRA	ESP	GBR				NC	0
2016	Toksport World Rally Team	Ford Fiesta R5	MON	SWE	MEX	ARG	POR	ITA	POL	FIN; 25	GER	CHN; C	FRA	ESP	GBR	AUS			NC	0
2018	Toksport World Rally Team	Škoda Fabia R5	MON	SWE; 16	MEX	FRA	ARG	POR	ITA	FIN	GER	TUR	GBR	ESP	AUS				NC	0
2019	Janne Tuohino	Ford Fiesta WRC	MON	SWE; 10	MEX	FRA	ARG	CHL	POR	ITA	FIN	GER	TUR	GBR	ESP	AUS; C			30th	1
2021	JanPro	Ford Fiesta WRC	MON	ARC; Ret	CRO	POR	ITA	KEN	EST	BEL	GRE	FIN	ESP	MNZ					NC	0

* Season still in progress.

=== JWRC Results ===
Year	Entrant	Car	1	2	3	4	5	6	JWRC	Points
2002	Janne Tuohino	Citroën Saxo S1600	MON; Ret	ESP; 5	GRE; 1	GER; Ret	ITA; 10	GBR; 4	3rd	15

=== SWRC results ===
Year	Entrant	Car	1	2	3	4	5	6	7	8	9	10	SWRC	Points
2010	JanPro	Ford Fiesta S2000	SWE; 2	MEX	JOR; Ret	NZL; Ret	POR; 8	FIN; 6	GER	JPN	FRA	GBR	EX	0

=== WRC-2 results ===
Year	Entrant	Car	1	2	3	4	5	6	7	8	9	10	11	12	13	14	WRC-2	Points
2016	Toksport World Rally Team	Ford Fiesta R5	MON	SWE	MEX	ARG	POR	ITA	POL	FIN; 11	GER	CHN; C	FRA	ESP	GBR	AUS	NC	0
2018	Toksport World Rally Team	Škoda Fabia R5	MON	SWE; 5	MEX	FRA	ARG	POR	ITA	FIN	GER	TUR	GBR	ESP	AUS		32nd	10
