= Ralliart =

Motorsports division of Mitsubishi Motors

- Type: Division
- Industry: Motorsport; Automotive engineering
- Founded: April 1984
- Headquarters: 33-7 Shiba 5-Chome, Minato, Tokyo 108-0014
- Key people: Andrew Cowan (founder); Doug Stewart (founder); Masao Taguchi (President, Executive Director)
- Revenue: ¥4,462 million (2005)
- Parent: Mitsubishi Motors

Ralliart is the high-performance division of Mitsubishi Motors. It was responsible for development and preparation of the company's rally development of high-performance models and parts available to the public. Ralliart scaled down its business activities in April 2010, though the brand will continue to be used by Mitsubishi.

Many regional licensees were set up previously. Ralliart Europe was established as Andrew Cowan Motorsports (ACMS) Ltd in 1983 by Andrew Cowan, a driver with the Mitsubishi team who had scored their first international victory in 1972 at the Southern Cross Rally. His team mate at the same event in 1975 and '76, Doug Stewart, set-up Ralliart Australia as the official regional licensee in 1988, after 22 years of experience with the company's cars. The two have subsequently served as operational bases for Mitsubishi's global motorsport activities, and were responsible for MMC's record of achievement in off-road racing, including the 1998 Manufacturers' Championship in the World Rally Championship, four individual Drivers' Championships for Tommi Mäkinen in 1996–99, and a record twelve wins in the Dakar Rally since 1982.

The company established Mitsubishi Motors Motor Sports in Trebur, Germany in November 2002, and then consolidated the previously independent licensees under this umbrella in 2003, acquiring ACMS Ltd from Cowan while Mitsubishi Motors Australia took over Stewart's operation.

== History ==
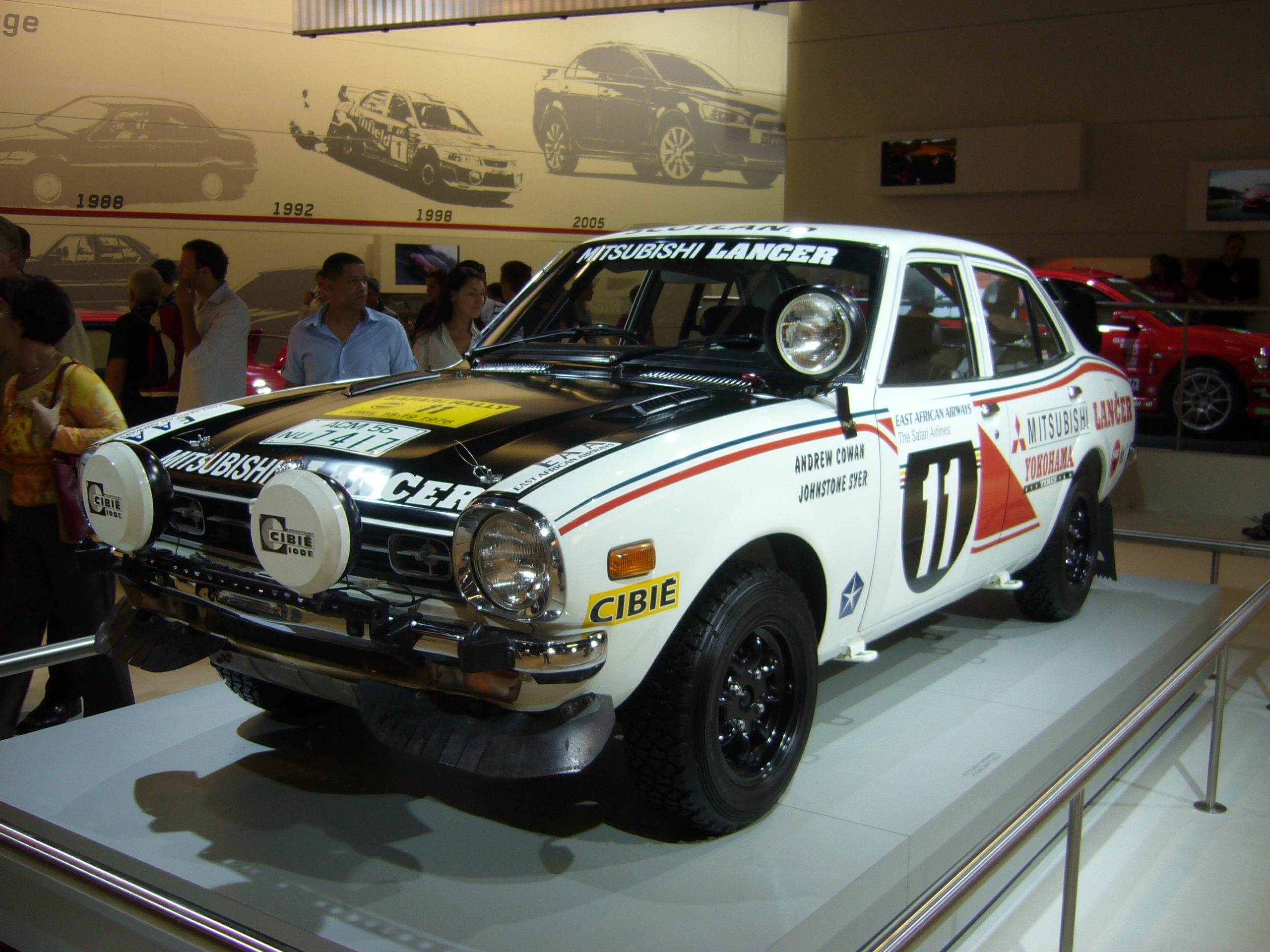
Andrew Cowan's Lancer 1600 GSR, exhibited in 2007.

=== Revival ===
On May 13, 2021, Mitsubishi executives announced that they would bring back Ralliart as part of a plan.

== Dakar Rally ==
In 2003, MMSP also purchased the Pont-de-Vaux-based SBM operation, which had been responsible for its cross country rallying activities, to form MMSP SAS.

The team used the Mitsubishi Pajero to win the Dakar Rally every year between 2004 and 2007. After the 2008 running was cancelled, the team developed a new car, the Mitsubishi Racing Lancer, for 2009, but struggled, losing the race to rivals Volkswagen. In 2009, Mitsubishi withdrew from cross-country competition.

In late 2009, Frenchman Nicolas Misslin acquired MMSP SAS and renamed it JMB Stradale Off Road.

== World Rally Championship ==
=== Ralliart Europe ===
Mitsubishi rally driver Andrew Cowan set up Andrew Cowan Motorsports (ACMS) in 1983 as a European base for Mitsubishi's motorsports activities. Based in Rugby, Warwickshire, it evolved into Ralliart Europe, with support from Mitsubishi's high performance division.

Ralliart Europe entered the World Rally Championship full-time for the first time in 1989, with the Mitsubishi Galant VR-4. The car won in the hands of Mikael Ericsson in Finland and Pentti Airikkala in Great Britain. Mitsubishi finished fourth in the manufacturers' standings in 1989, and third in 1990. Kenneth Eriksson delivered the team its next victory in Sweden in 1991.

The team introduced the Mitsubishi Lancer Evolution for the 1993 season, but did not manage to win during the year and only scored two podium finishes. The team developed the Lancer Evolution II and introduced it half-way through the 1994 season, Armin Schwarz scoring a second-placed finish on the cars debut in Greece. The car took its first victory on the following year's Rally Sweden, with Kenneth Eriksson leading home Tommi Mäkinen.

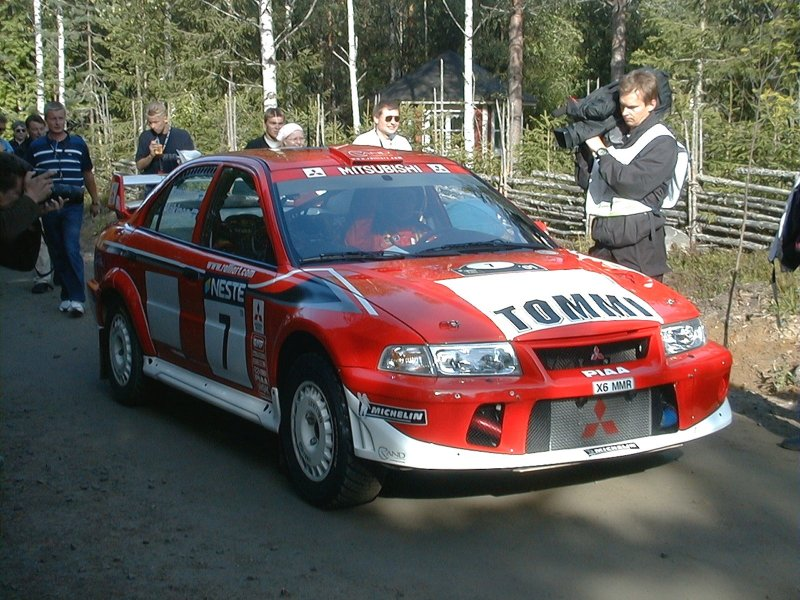
Tommi Mäkinen's Lancer Evolution VI on 2001 Rally Finland.

The Lancer Evolution III was soon introduced, and enjoyed great success in hand of Eriksson in the Asia-Pacific Rally Championship, Mitsubishi's main focus at the time. Eriksson took the Evolution III to victory on the 1995 Rally Australia, a round of both championships. He finished the WRC season in third place in the standings behind the dominant Subaru World Rally Team pairing of Colin McRae and Carlos Sainz, after the Toyota Castrol Team pairing of Juha Kankkunen and Didier Auriol were excluded from the championship for running illegal turbo restrictors. In 1996, Mäkinen won five out of the nine rounds to win the Drivers' Championship.

The Lancer Evolution IV was introduced for the start of the 1997 season. Mäkinen won four out of 14 rallies to win his and Mitsubishi's second drivers' title. The car won the second and third rounds of the 1998 season, before being replaced by the Lancer Evolution V for the fifth round in Spain. As their rivals Subaru and Ford were competing with the new World Rally Car spec, Mitsubishi continued to develop their cars to the old Group A regulations. Mäkinen took the car to victory in Argentina, which then won the final four events of the season, allowing Mäkinen to win a third straight title, while Mitsubishi were finally able to take their first manufacturers' title, thanks to two victories from Richard Burns.

The team introduced the Lancer Evolution VI for the opening round of the 1999, complete with sponsorship from Marlboro. Mäkinen won in Monte Carlo on the car's debut and then again on the next round in Sweden. He picked up further wins in New Zealand and Sanremo to record a then record fourth consecutive drivers' title. In 2000, the team struggled against their rivals and their World Rally Cars, Mäkinen only winning once and finishing fifth in the standings.

Mäkinen managed to win three times in 2001, until Mitsubishi introduced the Lancer WRC in Sanremo, having continued running to the old Group A regulations even though their rivals began working with the new WRC regulations from 1997. Both Mäkinen and teammate Freddy Loix struggled with the new car, before Mäkinen suffered a heavy accident that injured his co-driver Risto Mannisenmäki. Two retirements and a sixth-placed finish from the final three rallies meant that Mäkinen missed out on winning the title.

Mäkinen left the team for Subaru for 2002, so François Delecour and Alister McRae were signed to replace him and Loix, who had moved to Hyundai. Both struggled with the car though, McRae managed a fifth-place finish on Rally Sweden, but those were the only points the team would score all season. The team finished last in the manufacturers' points, behind Skoda and Hyundai. Mitsubishi would not compete during the 2003 season as Mitsubishi restructured their motorsports activities.

=== MMSP ===
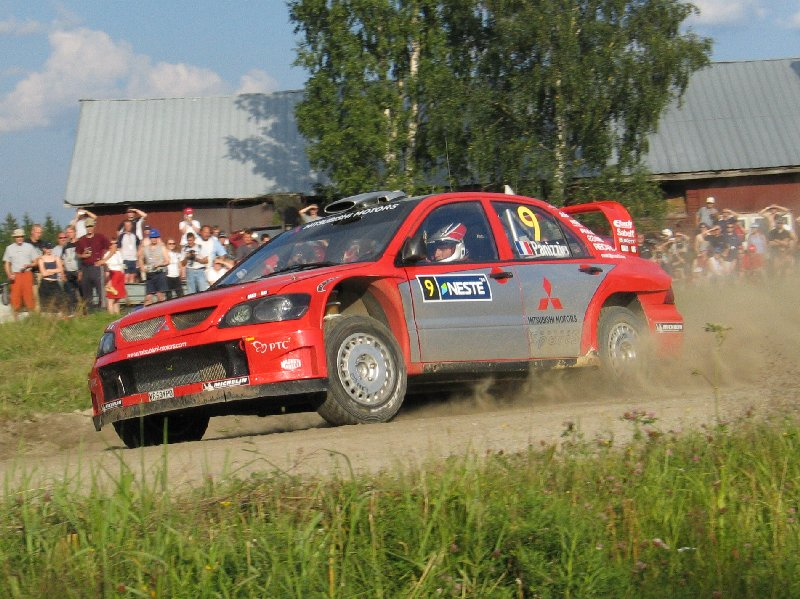
Gilles Panizzi driving the Lancer WRC04 at the 2004 Rally Finland.

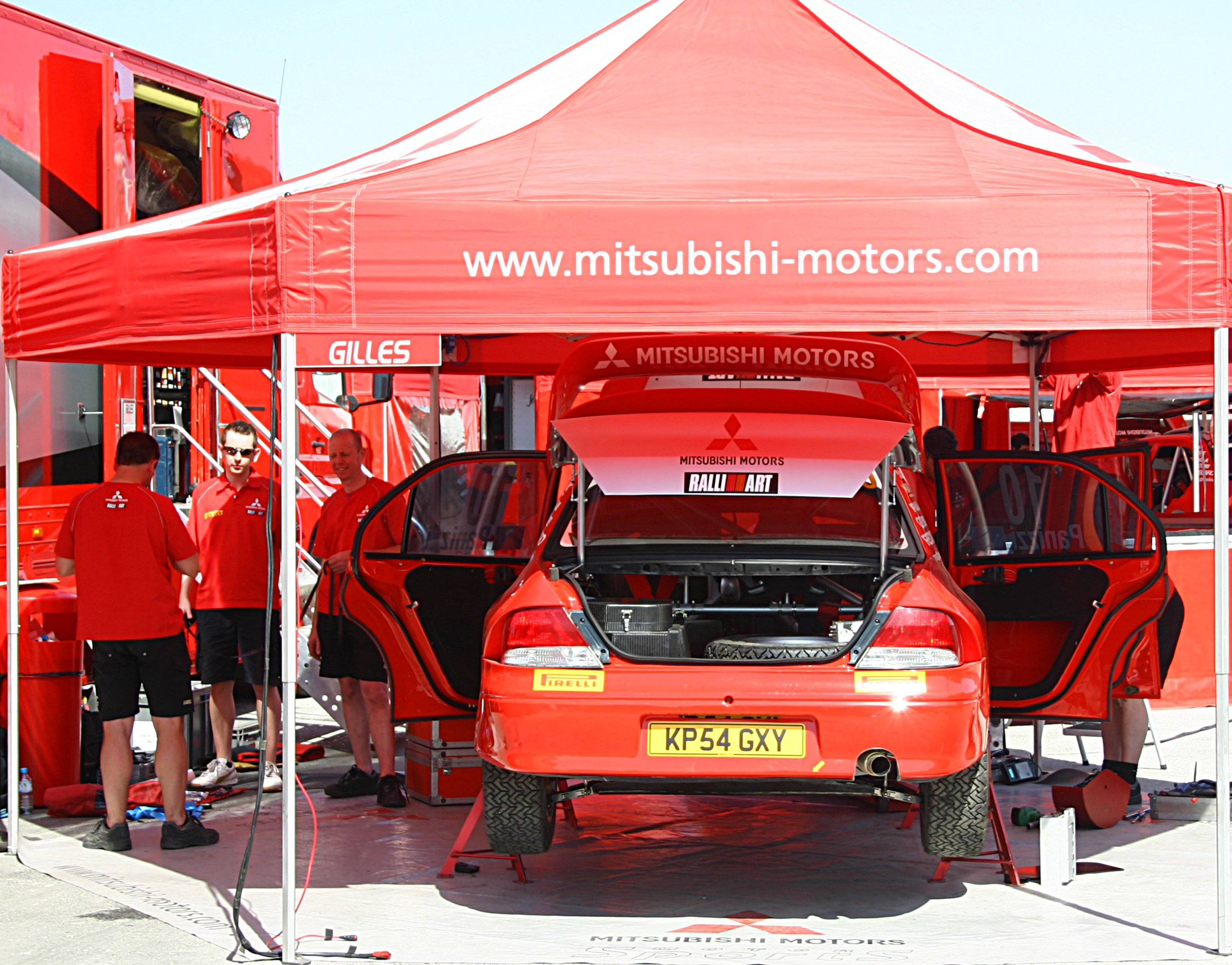
Mitsubishi Motors at the 2005 Cyprus Rally.

Mitsubishi consolidated their racing activities in 2003, acquiring ACMS Ltd from Cowan while Mitsubishi Motors Australia took over Stewart's operation. This followed the formation of Mitsubishi Motors Motor Sports (MMSP) GmbH in Trebur, Germany in November 2002.

The team signed experienced driver Gilles Panizzi to lead its lineup, and signed the less-experienced trio of Kristian Sohlberg, Gigi Galli and Daniel Solà to share its second car. Panizzi managed to score points on three occasions before the team reduced its programme after ten of 14 rounds, switching their focus to developing their 2005 car. The team did compete on Rally Catalunya, where both Sola and Galli finished in sixth and seventh place respectively.

Mitsubishi returned in 2005 with a developed car, the Lancer WRC05, and had signed Harri Rovanperä to drive one car on all 16 rallies, with Panizzi and Galli sharing the second car. Galli would be entered in a third car on selected events. Panizzi scored Mitsubishi's first podium finish since 2001 on the first event of the season, Monte Carlo. Rovanperä was a regular points scorer, finishing second on Rally Australia, to finish the season seventh in the drivers' standings. Galli scored points on six occasions. Mitsubishi finished fifth in the manufacturers' standings, ahead of Skoda.

At the end of 2005, Mitsubishi Motors Corporation suspended its participation in the WRC. MMSP Ltd supported Galli's Lancer WRC05 entry for the two opening rounds of 2006, in association with Ralliart Italy.

MMSP Ltd. ran two Lancer WRC05s for Toni Gardemeister and Xavier Pons on the first three rounds of the 2007 season, as well as a third car for Juho Hänninen on round three in Norway. It also ran Gardemeister on round five in Portugal alongside Armindo Araujo, and ran Gardemeister and Hänninen in Italy. It ran Urmo Aava in Greece, Finland and New Zealand, the Estonian scoring points in Finland and New Zealand.

In February 2009, MMSP Ltd operations manager John Easton completed a buy-out of the Rugby-based company to form MML Sports Ltd.

== Ralliart, Inc ==
Mitsubishi continues to use the Ralliart name both to sell aftermarket components and as a "halo" brand for higher-performance editions of many of its models. Many of the regional licensees continue to operate. Ralliart Italy prepares Mitsubishi rally cars for Armindo Araujo and the Pirelli Star Drivers in the Production World Rally Championship (PWRC). Ralliart China hold the brand rights for the China territory. Their head office is in Hong Kong but has facilities in different cities within China. They construct competition vehicles to be used in the China Rally Championship and China Cross Country Rally Championship, sell competition parts, manage teams and offer technical consultancy to its clients.

In 2012 Benito Guerra Jr. won in México, Argentina and España rallies, plus a second place in Germany, clinching the PWRC world championship in doing so.

=== WRC results ===
Year	Car	No	Driver	1	2	3	4	5	6	7	8	9	10	11	12	13	14	15	16	WDC	Points	WMC	Points
1989	Mitsubishi Galant VR-4		(Finland) Ari Vatanen	SWE	MON; 87	POR	KEN	FRA	GRC; Ret	NZL	ARG	FIN; Ret	AUS	ITA	CIV	GBR; 5				40th	8	4th	58
1989	Mitsubishi Galant VR-4		(Japan) Kenjiro Shinozuka	SWE	MON	POR; 18	KEN	FRA	GRC; 7	NZL; 6	ARG	FIN	AUS; 7	ITA	CIV	GBR				24th	14	4th	58
1989	Mitsubishi Galant VR-4		(United Kingdom) Jimmy McRae	SWE	MON	POR	KEN	FRA	GRC; 4	NZL	ARG	FIN	AUS	ITA	CIV	GBR				29th*	10*	4th	58
1989	Mitsubishi Galant VR-4		(Sweden) Mikael Ericsson	SWE	MON	POR	KEN	FRA	GRC	NZL	ARG	FIN; 1	AUS	ITA	CIV	GBR				4th*	50*	4th	58
1989	Mitsubishi Galant VR-4		(Australia) Ross Dunkerton	SWE	MON	POR	KEN	FRA	GRC	NZL	ARG	FIN	AUS; Ret	ITA	CIV	GBR				64th*	2*	4th	58
1989	Mitsubishi Galant VR-4		(Finland) Pentti Airikkala	SWE	MON	POR	KEN	FRA	GRC	NZL	ARG	FIN	AUS	ITA	CIV	GBR; 1				14th	20	4th	58
1990	Mitsubishi Galant VR-4		(Sweden) Kenneth Eriksson	MON; Ret	POR; Ret	KEN	FRA	GRC; Ret	NZL	ARG	FIN; 3	AUS; Ret	ITA	CIV	GBR; 2					8th	27	3rd	56
1990	Mitsubishi Galant VR-4		(Finland) Ari Vatanen	MON; Ret	POR; Ret	KEN	FRA	GRC; Ret	NZL	ARG	FIN; 2	AUS	ITA	CIV	GBR; Ret					16th	15	3rd	56
1990	Mitsubishi Galant VR-4		(Japan) Kenjiro Shinozuka	MON	POR	KEN; 5	FRA	GRC	NZL	ARG	FIN	AUS	ITA	CIV; Ret	GBR					28th	8	3rd	56
1990	Mitsubishi Galant VR-4		(Australia) Ross Dunkerton	MON	POR	KEN	FRA	GRC	NZL; 4	ARG	FIN	AUS; Ret	ITA	CIV	GBR					20th	10	3rd	56
1990	Mitsubishi Galant VR-4		(France) Patrick Tauziac	MON	POR	KEN	FRA	GRC	NZL	ARG	FIN	AUS	ITA	CIV; 1	GBR					12th	20	3rd	56
1991	Mitsubishi Galant VR-4		(Finland) Timo Salonen	MON; 8	SWE; Ret	POR	KEN	FRA	GRC; Ret	NZL	ARG	FIN; DSQ	AUS	ITA	CIV	ESP	GBR; 4			13th	21	3rd	62
1991	Mitsubishi Galant VR-4		(Sweden) Kenneth Eriksson	MON; Ret	SWE; 1	POR	KEN	FRA	GRC; 7	NZL	ARG	FIN; 3	AUS; 2	ITA	CIV	ESP	GBR; 2			5th	66	3rd	62
1991	Mitsubishi Galant VR-4		(Japan) Kenjiro Shinozuka	MON	SWE	POR	KEN; 8	FRA	GRC	NZL	ARG	FIN	AUS	ITA	CIV; 1	ESP	GBR			11th	23	3rd	62
1991	Mitsubishi Galant VR-4		(Australia) Ross Dunkerton	MON	SWE	POR	KEN	FRA	GRC	NZL; Ret	ARG	FIN	AUS; 7	ITA	CIV	ESP	GBR			40th	4	3rd	62
1991	Mitsubishi Galant VR-4		(France) Patrick Tauziac	MON	SWE	POR	KEN	FRA	GRC	NZL	ARG	FIN	AUS	ITA	CIV; 2	ESP	GBR			15th	15	3rd	62
1992	Mitsubishi Galant VR-4		(Finland) Timo Salonen	MON; 6	SWE	POR; 5	KEN	FRA	GRC	NZL	ARG	FIN	AUS	ITA	CIV	ESP	GBR			20th	14	5th	44
1992	Mitsubishi Galant VR-4		(Sweden) Kenneth Eriksson	MON; Ret	SWE	POR; Ret	KEN	FRA	GRC; Ret	NZL	ARG	FIN	AUS	ITA	CIV	ESP	GBR; 7			41st	4	5th	44
1992	Mitsubishi Galant VR-4		(Finland) Lasse Lampi	MON	SWE; 8	POR	KEN	FRA	GRC	NZL	ARG	FIN; 6	AUS	ITA	CIV	ESP	GBR; 11			28th	9	5th	44
1992	Mitsubishi Galant VR-4		(Japan) Kenjiro Shinozuka	MON	SWE	POR	KEN; 10	FRA	GRC	NZL	ARG	FIN	AUS	ITA	CIV; 1	ESP	GBR			14th	21	5th	44
1992	Mitsubishi Galant VR-4		(Australia) Ross Dunkerton	MON	SWE	POR	KEN	FRA	GRC	NZL; 3	ARG	FIN	AUS; 5	ITA	CIV	ESP	GBR			16th	20	5th	44
1992	Mitsubishi Galant VR-4		(France) Patrick Tauziac	MON	SWE	POR	KEN	FRA	GRC	NZL	ARG	FIN	AUS	ITA	CIV; Ret	ESP	GBR			-	0	5th	44
1993	Mitsubishi Lancer RS		(Germany) Armin Schwarz	MON; 6	SWE	POR; Ret	KEN	FRA	GRE; 3	ARG	NZL	FIN; 9	AUS	ITA	ESP	GBR; 8				12th	23	4th	86
1993	Mitsubishi Lancer RS		(Sweden) Kenneth Eriksson	MON; 4	SWE	POR; 5	KEN	FRA	GRE; Ret	ARG	NZL	FIN; 5	AUS	ITA	ESP	GBR; 2				6th	41	4th	86
1993	Mitsubishi Lancer RS		(Japan) Kenjiro Shinozuka	MON	SWE	POR	KEN; Ret	FRA	GRE	ARG	NZL	FIN	AUS	ITA	ESP	GBR				-	0	4th	86
1993	Mitsubishi Lancer RS		(Australia) Ross Dunkerton	MON	SWE	POR	KEN	FRA	GRE	ARG	NZL; Ret	FIN	AUS; 4	ITA	ESP	GBR				24th	10	4th	86
1994	Mitsubishi Lancer RS		(Germany) Armin Schwarz	MON; 7	POR	KEN	FRA													7th	31	4th	86
1994	Mitsubishi Lancer Evo II		(Germany) Armin Schwarz					GRE; 2	ARG	NZL; 3	FIN	ITA; Ret	GBR							7th	31	4th	86
1994	Mitsubishi Lancer RS		(Sweden) Kenneth Eriksson	MON; 5	POR	KEN	FRA													12th	18	4th	86
1994	Mitsubishi Lancer Evo II		(Sweden) Kenneth Eriksson					GRE; Ret	ARG	NZL; 4	FIN	ITA	GBR							12th	18	4th	86
1994	Mitsubishi Lancer Evo II		(Japan) Kenjiro Shinozuka	MON	POR	KEN; 2	FRA	GRE	ARG	NZL	FIN	ITA	GBR							13th	15	4th	86
1994	Mitsubishi Lancer Evo II		(Finland) Tommi Mäkinen	MON	POR	KEN	FRA	GRE	ARG	NZL	FIN	ITA; 2	GBR							10th	22	4th	86
1995	Mitsubishi Lancer Evo II	10	(Sweden) Kenneth Eriksson	MON	SWE; 1															3rd	48	2nd	307
1995	Mitsubishi Lancer Evo III	10	(Sweden) Kenneth Eriksson					NZL; 5	AUS; 1	ESP	GBR; Ret									3rd	48	2nd	307
1995	Mitsubishi Lancer Evo II	10	(Germany) Isolde Holderied			POR; 11	FRA; 19													32nd*	1*	2nd	307
1995	Mitsubishi Lancer Evo II	11	(Finland) Tommi Mäkinen	MON; 4	SWE; 2															5th	38	2nd	307
1995	Mitsubishi Lancer Evo III	11	(Finland) Tommi Mäkinen				FRA; 8	NZL; Ret	AUS; 4	ESP; Ret	GBR; Ret									5th	38	2nd	307
1995	Mitsubishi Lancer Evo II	11	(Argentina) Jorge Recalde			POR; 10														20th*	4*	2nd	307
1995	Mitsubishi Lancer Evo II	12	(Italy) Andrea Aghini	MON; 6																7th	26	2nd	307
1995	Mitsubishi Lancer Evo III	12	(Italy) Andrea Aghini				FRA; 3			ESP; 5										7th	26	2nd	307
1995	Mitsubishi Lancer Evo II	12	(Sweden) Kenneth Bäcklund		SWE; 10															32nd	1	2nd	307
1995	Mitsubishi Lancer Evo II	12	(Portugal) Rui Madeira			POR; 9				ESP; 11	GBR; 7									11th	7	2nd	307
1995	Mitsubishi Lancer Evo III	12	(Australia) Ed Ordynski					NZL; 11	AUS; 8											21st	3	2nd	307
1996	Mitsubishi Lancer Evo III	7	(Finland) Tommi Mäkinen	SWE; 1	KEN; 1	IDN; Ret	GRE; 2	ARG; 1	FIN; 1	AUS; 1	ITA; Ret	ESP; 5								1st	123	2nd	322
1996	Mitsubishi Lancer Evo III	8	(Sweden) Kenneth Bäcklund	SWE; 14																-	0	2nd	322
1996	Mitsubishi Lancer Evo III	8	(Japan) Kenjiro Shinozuka		KEN; 6															20th	6	2nd	322
1996	Mitsubishi Lancer Evo III	8	(United Kingdom) Richard Burns			IDN; Ret		ARG; 4		AUS; 5		ESP; Ret								9th	18	2nd	322
1996	Mitsubishi Lancer Evo III	8	(Germany) Uwe Nittel				GRE; 14													35th	1	2nd	322
1996	Mitsubishi Lancer Evo III	8	(Finland) Lasse Lampi						FIN; 8											27th	3	2nd	322
1996	Mitsubishi Lancer Evo III	8	(France) Didier Auriol								ITA; 8									27th	3	2nd	322
1996	Mitsubishi Lancer Evo III	9	(Germany) Uwe Nittel	SWE; 16	KEN			ARG; 10			ITA; Ret									35th	1	2nd	322
1996	Mitsubishi Lancer Evo III	9	(Japan) Yoshihiro Kataoka			IDN; Ret														-	0	2nd	322
1996	Mitsubishi Lancer Evo III	9	(Belgium) Pascal Smets				GRE; 17													-	0	2nd	322
1996	Mitsubishi Lancer Evo III	9	(Finland) Jouko Puhakka						FIN; Ret											-	0	2nd	322
1996	Mitsubishi Lancer Evo III	9	(Australia) Ed Ordynski							AUS; 10										35th	1	2nd	322
1997	Mitsubishi Lancer Evo IV	1	(Finland) Tommi Mäkinen	MON; 3	SWE; 3	KEN; Ret	POR; 1	ESP; 1	FRA; Ret	ARG; 1	GRE; 3	NZL; Ret	FIN; 1	IDN; Ret	ITA; 3	AUS; 2	GBR; 6			1st	63	3rd	86
1997	Mitsubishi Lancer Evo IV	2	(Germany) Uwe Nittel										FIN; 7							17th	3	3rd	86
1997	Mitsubishi Lancer Evo III	2	(Germany) Uwe Nittel	MON; 5	SWE; Ret			ESP; 8	FRA; 8						ITA; Ret					17th	3	3rd	86
1997	Mitsubishi Carisma GT Evo IV	2	(United Kingdom) Richard Burns			KEN; 2	POR; Ret			ARG; Ret		NZL; 4		IDN; 4		AUS; 4	GBR; 4			7th	21	3rd	86
1997	Mitsubishi Lancer Evo IV	2	(United Kingdom) Richard Burns								GRE; 4									7th	21	3rd	86
1997	Mitsubishi Lancer Evo III	10	(Germany) Uwe Nittel			KEN	POR			ARG	GRE; 6	NZL		IDN		AUS	GBR			17th	3	3rd	86
1997	Mitsubishi Lancer Evo III	13	(Japan) Kenjiro Shinozuka	MON	SWE	KEN	POR	ESP	FRA	ARG	GRE	NZL	FIN	IDN	ITA	AUS; Ret	GBR			-	0	3rd	86
1998	Mitsubishi Lancer Evo IV	1	(Finland) Tommi Mäkinen	MON; Ret	SWE; 1	KEN; Ret	POR; Ret													1st	58	1st	91
1998	Mitsubishi Lancer Evo V	1	(Finland) Tommi Mäkinen					ESP; 3	FRA; Ret	ARG; 1	GRE; Ret	NZL; 3	FIN; 1	ITA; 1	AUS; 1	GBR; Ret				1st	58	1st	91
1998	Mitsubishi Carisma GT Evo IV	2	(United Kingdom) Richard Burns	MON; 5	SWE; 15	KEN; 1	POR; 4													6th	33	1st	91
1998	Mitsubishi Carisma GT Evo V	2	(United Kingdom) Richard Burns					ESP; 4	FRA; Ret	ARG; 4	GRE; Ret	NZL; 9	FIN; 5	ITA; 7	AUS; Ret	GBR; 1				6th	33	1st	91
1998	Mitsubishi Carisma GT Evo IV	16	(Germany) Uwe Nittel	MON; 7	SWE; 7	KEN	POR; Ret	ESP; 9												-	0	1st	91
1998	Mitsubishi Carisma GT Evo V	16	(Germany) Uwe Nittel						FRA	ARG	GRE; Ret	NZL	FIN; Ret	ITA	AUS	GBR				-	0	1st	91
1999	Mitsubishi Lancer Evo VI	1	(Finland) Tommi Mäkinen	MON; 1	SWE; 1	KEN; DSQ	POR; 5	ESP; 3	FRA; 6	ARG; 4	GRE; 3	NZL; 1	FIN; Ret	CHN; Ret	ITA; 1	AUS; 3	GBR; Ret			1st	62	3rd	86
1999	Mitsubishi Carisma GT Evo VI	2	(Belgium) Freddy Loix	MON; Ret	SWE; 9	KEN; Ret		ESP; 4	FRA; 8	ARG; Ret	GRE; 4	NZL; 8	FIN; 10	CHN; Ret	ITA; 4	AUS; 4	GBR; 5			8th	14	3rd	86
1999	Mitsubishi Carisma GT Evo VI	2	(Finland) Marcus Grönholm				POR; Ret													15th*	5*	3rd	86
2000	Mitsubishi Lancer Evo VI	1	(Finland) Tommi Mäkinen	MON; 1	SWE; 2	KEN; Ret	POR; Ret	ESP; 4	ARG; 3	GRE; Ret	NZL; Ret	FIN; 4	CYP; 5	FRA; Ret	ITA; 3	AUS; DSQ	GBR; 3			5th	36	4th	43
2000	Mitsubishi Carisma GT Evo VI	2	(Belgium) Freddy Loix	MON; 6	SWE; 8	KEN; Ret	POR; 6	ESP; 8	ARG; 5	GRE; Ret	NZL; Ret	FIN; Ret	CYP; 8	FRA; Ret	ITA; 8	AUS; Ret	GBR; Ret			15th	4	4th	43
2001	Mitsubishi Lancer Evo 6.5	7	(Finland) Tommi Mäkinen	MON; 1	SWE; Ret	POR; 1	ESP; 3	ARG; 4	CYP; Ret	GRE; 4	KEN; 1	FIN; Ret	NZL; 8							3rd	41	3rd	69
2001	Mitsubishi Lancer WRC	7	(Finland) Tommi Mäkinen											ITA; Ret	FRA; Ret	AUS; 6	GBR; Ret			3rd	41	3rd	69
2001	Mitsubishi Lancer Evo 6.5	8	(Belgium) Freddy Loix	MON; 6	SWE; 13	POR; Ret	ESP; 4	ARG; 6	CYP; 5	GRC; 9	KEN; 5	FIN; 10	NZL; 11							13th	9	3rd	69
2001	Mitsubishi Lancer WRC	8	(Belgium) Freddy Loix											ITA; 12	FRA; 12	AUS; 11	GBR; Ret			13th	9	3rd	69
2001	Mitsubishi Lancer Evo 6.5	19	(Sweden) Thomas Rådström	MON	SWE; 2	POR	ESP	ARG												15th	6	3rd	69
2001	Mitsubishi Lancer Evo 6.5	19	(Japan) Katsuhiko Taguchi						CYP; Ret	GRC	KEN									15th	6	3rd	69
2001	Mitsubishi Carisma GT Evo VI	19	(Finland) Toni Gardemeister									FIN; Ret	NZL; 15	ITA	FRA	AUS	GBR			15th	6	3rd	69
2002	Mitsubishi Lancer WRC	7	(France) François Delecour	MON; 9	SWE; 34	FRA; 7	ESP; 9	CYP; 13	ARG; Ret	GRE; 11	KEN; Ret									-	0	5th	9
2002	Mitsubishi Lancer WRC2	7	(France) François Delecour									FIN; Ret	GER; 9	ITA; 10	NZL; 9	AUS; Ret	GBR; Ret			-	0	5th	9
2002	Mitsubishi Lancer WRC	8	(United Kingdom) Alister McRae	MON; 14	SWE; 5	FRA; 10	ESP; 13	CYP; Ret	ARG; 8	GRE; Ret	KEN; 9									15th	2	5th	9
2002	Mitsubishi Lancer WRC2	8	(United Kingdom) Alister McRae									FIN; Ret	GER; Ret	ITA; Ret	NZL	AUS				15th	2	5th	9
2002	Mitsubishi Lancer WRC2	8	(United Kingdom) Justin Dale														GBR; Ret			-	0	5th	9
2002	Mitsubishi Lancer WRC	9	(Finland) Jani Paasonen	MON	SWE; 14	FRA	ESP	CYP; Ret	ARG	GRE	KEN									-	0	5th	9
2002	Mitsubishi Lancer WRC2	9	(Finland) Jani Paasonen											FIN; 8	NZL; Ret	AUS; 9	GBR; Ret			-	0	5th	9
2003	Mitsubishi Lancer WRC2	32	(United Kingdom) Alister McRae	MON	SWE	TUR	NZL; 6	ARG	GRE	CYP	GER	FIN	AUS	ITA	FRA	ESP	GBR			17th	3	-	0
2003	Mitsubishi Lancer WRC2	32	(Finland) Jani Paasonen	MON	SWE	TUR	NZL	ARG	GRE	CYP	GER; Ret	FIN	AUS	ITA	FRA	ESP	GBR			-	0	-	0
2003	Mitsubishi Lancer WRC2	34	(Finland) Kristian Sohlberg	MON	SWE; 12	TUR	NZL; Ret	ARG	GRE	CYP	GER; 14	FIN	AUS	ITA	FRA	ESP	GBR			-	0	-	0
2004	Mitsubishi Lancer WRC04	9	(France) Gilles Panizzi	MON; 6	SWE; Ret	MEX; 8	NZL; Ret	CYP; Ret	GRE; 10	TUR; Ret	ARG; 7	FIN; 11	GER; Ret	JPN	GBR	ITA	FRA	ESP; 12	AUS	13th	6	5th	17
2004	Mitsubishi Lancer WRC04	10	(Italy) Gianluigi Galli	MON; Ret		MEX; Ret				TUR; 10										15th	5	5th	17
2004	Mitsubishi Lancer WRC04	10	(Finland) Kristian Sohlberg		SWE; Ret		NZL; Ret	CYP; Ret			ARG; Ret	FIN; Ret								-	0	5th	17
2004	Mitsubishi Lancer WRC04	10	(Spain) Dani Solà						GRE; Ret				GER; Ret	JPN	GBR	ITA	FRA	ESP; 6	AUS	21st	3	5th	17
2004	Mitsubishi Lancer WRC04	14	(Italy) Gianluigi Galli		SWE		NZL	CYP	GRE		ARG	FIN	GER	JPN	GBR	ITA	FRA	ESP; 7	AUS	15th	5	5th	17
2005	Mitsubishi Lancer WRC05	9	(Finland) Harri Rovanperä	MON; 7	SWE; 4	MEX; 5	NZL; Ret	ITA; Ret	CYP; 7	TUR; 10	GRE; 6	ARG; 5	FIN; 7	GER; 10	GBR; 4	JPN; 5	FRA; 10	ESP; 10	AUS; 2	7th	39	5th	76
2005	Mitsubishi Lancer WRC05	10	(France) Gilles Panizzi	MON; 3	SWE	MEX; 8	NZL	ITA	CYP; 11	TUR	GRE	ARG	FIN	GER	GBR	JPN; 11	FRA; Ret	ESP	AUS	15th	7	5th	76
2005	Mitsubishi Lancer WRC05	10	(Italy) Gianluigi Galli		SWE; 7		NZL; 8	ITA; Ret		TUR; 8	GRE; 7	ARG; Ret	FIN; Ret	GER; 5	GBR; 14			ESP; Ret	AUS; 5	11th	14	5th	76
2005	Mitsubishi Lancer WRC05	18	(Italy) Gianluigi Galli	MON		MEX			CYP							JPN; Ret	FRA; 9			11th	14	5th	76
2006	Mitsubishi Lancer WRC 05	14	(Italy) Gianluigi Galli	MON; Ret	SWE; 4	MEX	ESP	FRA	ARG	ITA	GRE	GER	FIN	JPN	CYP	TUR	AUS	NZL	GBR	11th*	15*	-	-
2006	Mitsubishi Lancer WRC 05	15	(Sweden) Daniel Carlsson	MON	SWE; 3	MEX	ESP	FRA	ARG	ITA	GRE	GER	FIN; Ret	JPN	CYP	TUR	AUS	NZL	GBR	16th	6	-	-
2006	Mitsubishi Lancer WRC 05	18	(Finland) Jussi Välimäki	MON	SWE	MEX	ESP	FRA	ARG	ITA; 5	GRE; 9	GER	FIN; 7	JPN	CYP	TUR	AUS	NZL	GBR	17th	6	-	-
2006	Mitsubishi Lancer WRC 05	22	(Finland) Juho Hänninen	MON	SWE	MEX	ESP	FRA	ARG	ITA	GRE	GER	FIN; DSQ	JPN	CYP	TUR	AUS	NZL	GBR	-	0	-	-
2007	Mitsubishi Lancer WRC 05	-	(Finland) Toni Gardemeister	MON; 7	SWE; 6	NOR; Ret	MEX	POR; DSQ	ARG	ITA; 6	GRE	FIN	GER	NZL	ESP	FRA	JPN	IRE	GBR	13th	10	-	-
2007	Mitsubishi Lancer WRC 05	-	(Spain) Xavier Pons	MON; 26	SWE; Ret	NOR; 16	MEX	POR	ARG	ITA	GRE	FIN	GER	NZL	ESP	FRA	JPN	IRE	GBR	17th*	4*	-	-
2007	Mitsubishi Lancer WRC 05	-	(Finland) Juho Hänninen	MON	SWE	NOR; 17	MEX	POR	ARG	ITA; 8	GRE	FIN; Ret	GER	NZL	ESP	FRA	JPN	IRE	GBR	22nd	1	-	-
2007	Mitsubishi Lancer WRC 05	-	(Portugal) Armindo Araújo	MON	SWE	NOR	MEX	POR; Ret	ARG	ITA	GRE	FIN	GER	NZL	ESP	FRA	JPN	IRE	GBR	-	0	-	-
2007	Mitsubishi Lancer WRC 05	-	(Estonia) Urmo Aava	MON	SWE	NOR	MEX	POR	ARG	ITA	GRE; 14	FIN; 7	GER	NZL; 8	ESP	FRA	JPN	IRE	GBR	19th	3	-	-
2007	Mitsubishi Lancer WRC 05	-	(Finland) Kristian Sohlberg	MON	SWE	NOR	MEX	POR	ARG	ITA	GRE	FIN; Ret	GER	NZL	ESP	FRA	JPN	IRE	GBR	-	0	-	-
2007	Mitsubishi Lancer WRC 05	-	(Finland) Kaj Kuistila	MON	SWE	NOR	MEX	POR	ARG	ITA	GRE	FIN; 13	GER	NZL	ESP	FRA	JPN	IRE	GBR	-	0	-	-

== Complete JGTC Results ==
(key) (Races in bold indicate pole position) (Races in italics indicate fastest lap)

Year	Car	Tyres	Class	No.	Drivers	1	2	3	4	5	6	7	8	Pos	Pts
1998	Mitsubishi FTO	**T**	GT300	61	(Japan) Akihiko Nakaya (Japan) Takahiko Hara	SUZ; 3	FUJ; C	SEN; 7	FUJ; Ret	MOT; Ret	MIN; 6	SUG; 2	NC1; Ret	5th	37
1999	Mitsubishi FTO	**T**	GT300	61	(Republic of Ireland) Ralph Firman (Japan) Akihiko Nakaya (Argentina) Rubén Derfler	SUZ; 2	FUJ; Ret	SUG; 5	MIN; Ret	FUJ; 3	OKA; 8	MOT; 7	NC1	6th	42
