= Babis Vovos =

Greek businessman (1933–2024)

- Born: 10 January 1933; Filiatra, Greece
- Died: 13 July 2024 (aged 91); Athens, Greece
- Occupation: Businessman

Babis (Haralambos) Vovos (Greek: Μπάμπης (Χαράλαμπος) Βωβός; 10 January 1933 – 13 July 2024) was a Greek civil engineer and businessman. He was the owner of the Greek construction company Babis Vovos Constructions, which filed for bankruptcy in 2015 having been severely damaged by the Greek economic crisis of 2009.

On 22 February 2013, the Greek property developer tycoon was arrested.

On 20 March 2018, it was announced in the Greek media that his private residence located in the affluent area of Palaio Psychiko was to be auctioned.

Vovos died in Athens on 13 July 2024, at the age of 91.
