= Armodios Vovos =

Greek rally driver and businessman (born 1964)

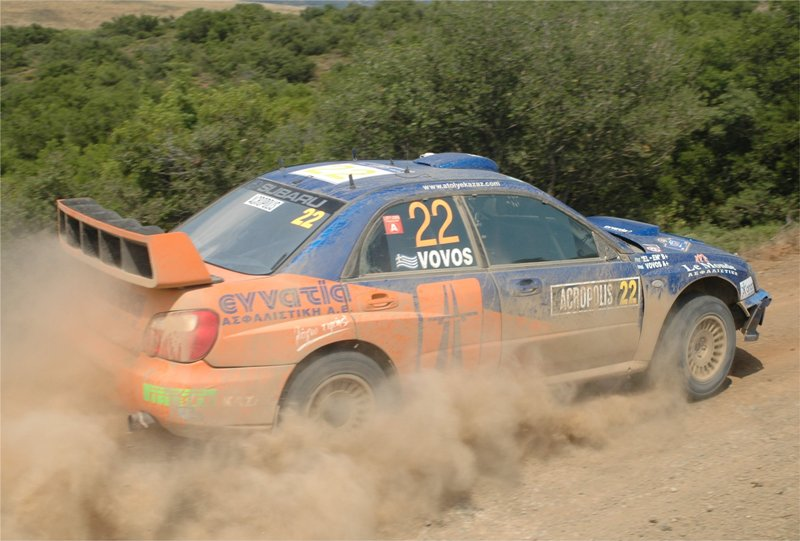

Personal information
- Born: 21 October 1964 (age 62)

Armodios "Aris" C. Vovos (Greek: Αρμόδιος "Άρης" Βωβός; born 21 October 1964) is a Greek businessman. Vovos was a rally driver and president of Maroussi Basketball Club. His family has a business by the name of Babis Vovos Constructions that filed for bankruptcy protection in 2015.

== Rally driver ==
Vovos was the first Greek finisher in the Acropolis Rally in 1994. In 1995, he won the rally with Kostas Stefanis as his co-driver; the race was not a World Championship event that year. He scored three points in the 1994 World Rally Championship season and one point in the 2004 World Rally Championship season. He also competed in 2005, 2006, and 2007. He also won the Greek Rally Championship in 1995 driving a Lancia Delta, in 1997 with a Subaru Impreza WRC, in 2000 with Toyota Corolla WRC in 2001 with a Subaru Impreza WRC, and in 2009 and 2010 with Mitsubishi Lancer EVO IX (in group N).

From 2002 to 2008, Vovos participated in events in Greece and abroad, along with "EL-EM" (Loris Meletopoulos) as his co-driver.

=== Racing awards ===
Greek Rally Championship:

- 1995 (1st)
- 1997 (1st)
- 2000 (1st)
- 2001 (1st)
- 2009 (1st)
- 2010 (1st)

Greek Gravel Cup:

- 2004 (Winner)
- 2005 (Winner)

Acropolis Rally:

- 1994 (Best Greek Driver) 8 Overall
- 1995 (1st place in General)
- 1997 (Best Greek Driver) 9 Overall
- 2004 (Best Greek Driver) 8 Overall
- 2005 (Best Greek Driver) 12 Overall
- 2006 (Best Greek Driver) 15 Overall
- 2007 (Best Greek Driver) 13 Overall

== Personal ==
Vovos is married to Vicky Lagopoulou and they have one daughter. He is the son of Greek businessman Babis Vovos.
