= 2005 Swedish Rally =

2nd round of the 2005 World Rally Championship

2005 Swedish Rally 54th Uddeholm Swedish Rally
Round 2 of the 2005 World Rally Championship season
← Previous event	Next event →
- Host country: Sweden
- Rally base: Karlstad
- Dates run: February 11, 2005 – February 13, 2005
- Stages: 20 (335.55 km; 208.50 miles)
- Stage surface: Snow/ice
- Overall distance: 1,726 km (1,072 miles)

Statistics
- Crews: 69 at start, 46 at finish

Overall results
- Overall winner: (Norway) Petter Solberg (United Kingdom) Phil Mills (Japan) Subaru World Rally Team; Subaru Impreza S10 WRC '04

The 2005 Swedish Rally (formally the 54th Uddeholm Swedish Rally) was the second round of the 2005 World Rally Championship. The rally was held over three days between 11 February and 13 February 2005, and was won by Subaru's Petter Solberg, his 11th win in the World Rally Championship.

== Background ==
=== Entry list ===
No.	Driver	Co-Driver	Entrant	Car	Tyre
World Rally Championship manufacturer entries
1	(France) Sébastien Loeb	(Monaco) Daniel Elena	(France) Citroën Total WRT	Citroën Xsara WRC	M
2	(Belgium) François Duval	(Belgium) Stéphane Prévot	(France) Citroën Total WRT	Citroën Xsara WRC	M
3	(Finland) Toni Gardemeister	(Finland) Jakke Honkanen	(United Kingdom) BP Ford World Rally Team	Ford Focus RS WRC '04	M
4	(Norway) Henning Solberg	(Norway) Cato Menkerud	(United Kingdom) BP Ford World Rally Team	Ford Focus RS WRC '04	M
5	(Norway) Petter Solberg	(United Kingdom) Phil Mills	(Japan) Subaru World Rally Team	Subaru Impreza S10 WRC '04	P
6	(France) Stéphane Sarrazin	(France) Denis Giraudet	(Japan) Subaru World Rally Team	Subaru Impreza S10 WRC '04	P
7	(Finland) Marcus Grönholm	(Finland) Timo Rautiainen	(France) Marlboro Peugeot Total	Peugeot 307 WRC	P
8	(Estonia) Markko Märtin	(United Kingdom) Michael Park	(France) Marlboro Peugeot Total	Peugeot 307 WRC	P
9	(Finland) Harri Rovanperä	(Finland) Risto Pietiläinen	(Japan) Mitsubishi Motors	Mitsubishi Lancer WRC 05	P
10	(Italy) Gianluigi Galli	(Italy) Guido D'Amore	(Japan) Mitsubishi Motors	Mitsubishi Lancer WRC 05	P
11	(Sweden) Mattias Ekström	(Sweden) Stefan Bergman	(Czech Republic) Škoda Motorsport	Škoda Fabia WRC	M
12	(Finland) Janne Tuohino	(Finland) Mikko Markkula	(Czech Republic) Škoda Motorsport	Škoda Fabia WRC	M
World Rally Championship entries
14	(Germany) Antony Warmbold	(United Kingdom) Michael Orr	(United Kingdom) BP Ford World Rally Team	Ford Focus RS WRC '04	M
15	(Australia) Chris Atkinson	(Australia) Glenn Macneall	(Japan) Subaru World Rally Team	Subaru Impreza S10 WRC '04	P
16	(Finland) Jani Paasonen	(Finland) Jani Vainikka	(Czech Republic) Škoda Motorsport	Škoda Fabia WRC	M
17	(Czech Republic) Roman Kresta	(Czech Republic) Jan Tománek	(United Kingdom) BP Ford World Rally Team	Ford Focus RS WRC '04	M
18	(Finland) Kristian Sohlberg	(Finland) Kaj Lindström	(Finland) Kristian Sohlberg	Ford Focus WRC '02	M
19	(Sweden) Daniel Carlsson	(Sweden) Mattias Andersson	(France) Bozian Racing	Peugeot 307 WRC	P
21	(Sweden) Tobias Johansson	(Norway) Ola Fløene	(Sweden) Rally Team Olsbergs	Subaru Impreza S10 WRC '04	P
23	(Finland) Mikko Hirvonen	(Finland) Jarmo Lehtinen	(Finland) Mikko Hirvonen	Ford Focus RS WRC '03	M
24	(Finland) Jari-Matti Latvala	(Finland) Miikka Anttila	(Finland) Jari-Matti Latvala	Toyota Corolla WRC	M
25	(Sweden) Stig-Olov Walfridsson	(Sweden) Gunnar Barth	(Sweden) Stig-Olov Walfridsson	Mitsubishi Lancer Evo 6.5	C
26	(Norway) Thomas Schie	(Sweden) Göran Bergsten	(Norway) Thomas Schie	Ford Focus WRC '02	—N/a
27	(Norway) Rune Dalsjø	(Norway) Kjell Pettersen	(Norway) Rune Dalsjø	Mitsubishi Lancer Evo VI	M
74	(Republic of Ireland) George Tracey	(Sweden) Maria Andersson	(Republic of Ireland) George Tracey	Peugeot 206 WRC	—N/a
PWRC entries
31	(Japan) Toshihiro Arai	(New Zealand) Tony Sircombe	(United Kingdom) Subaru Team Arai	Subaru Impreza STI N11	P
32	(Spain) Xavier Pons	(Spain) Oriol Julià Pascual	(Spain) Xevi Pons	Mitsubishi Lancer Evo VIII	M
34	(Japan) Fumio Nutahara	(Japan) Satoshi Hayashi	(Japan) Advan-Piaa Rally Team	Mitsubishi Lancer Evo VIII	Y
37	(United Kingdom) Mark Higgins	(United Kingdom) Trevor Agnew	(United Kingdom) Mark Higgins	Subaru Impreza STI N11	P
38	(Italy) Fabio Frisiero	(Italy) Giovanni Agnese	(Italy) Fabio Frisiero	Subaru Impreza STI N11	P
39	(Sweden) Joakim Roman	(Sweden) Bosse Holmstrand	(Sweden) Joakim Roman	Subaru Impreza STI N10	M
43	(Italy) Angelo Medeghini	(Italy) Barbara Capoferri	(Italy) Angelo Medeghini	Mitsubishi Lancer Evo VIII	P
45	(Italy) Riccardo Errani	(Italy) Stefano Casadio	(Italy) Riccardo Errani	Mitsubishi Lancer Evo VIII	—N/a
50	(Finland) Aki Teiskonen	(Finland) Miika Teiskonen	(Japan) Syms Rally Team	Subaru Impreza STI	—N/a

=== Itinerary ===
All dates and times are CET (UTC+1).

Date	Time	No.	Stage name	Distance
1. leg — 106.48 km
11 February	09:00	SS1	Likenäs 1	21.78 km
11 February	10:23	SS2	Hara 1	11.32 km
11 February	11:05	SS3	Torntorp 1	19.21 km
11 February	13:46	SS4	Likenäs 2	21.78 km
11 February	15:09	SS5	Hara 2	11.32 km
11 February	15:51	SS6	Torntorp 2	19.21 km
11 February	17:10	SS7	Hagfors Sprint 1	1.86 km
2. leg — 139.53 km
12 February	07:59	SS8	Sundsjön 1	20.78 km
12 February	08:48	SS9	Vargåsen 1	24.79 km
12 February	11:23	SS10	Fredriksberg	20.13 km
12 February	12:12	SS11	Lejen	26.40 km
12 February	15:00	SS12	Sundsjön 2	20.78 km
12 February	15:49	SS13	Vargåsen 2	24.79 km
12 February	17:13	SS14	Hagfors Sprint 2	1.86 km
3. leg — 89.54 km
13 February	08:08	SS15	Lesjöfors 1	10.17 km
13 February	08:41	SS16	Rämmen 1	23.35 km
13 February	09:30	SS17	Malta 1	11.25 km
13 February	11:43	SS18	Lesjöfors 2	10.17 km
13 February	12:16	SS19	Rämmen 2	23.35 km
13 February	13:05	SS20	Malta 2	11.25 km

== Results ==
=== Overall ===
Pos.	No.	Driver	Co-driver	Team	Car	Time	Difference	Points
1	5	(Norway) Petter Solberg	(United Kingdom) Phil Mills	(Japan) Subaru World Rally Team	Subaru Impreza S10 WRC '04	3:00:52.1		10
2	8	(Estonia) Markko Märtin	(United Kingdom) Michael Park	(France) Marlboro Peugeot Total	Peugeot 307 WRC	3:03:03.2	+2:11.1	8
3	3	(Finland) Toni Gardemeister	(Finland) Jakke Honkanen	(United Kingdom) BP Ford World Rally Team	Ford Focus RS WRC '04	3:04:06.8	+3:14.7	6
4	9	(Finland) Harri Rovanperä	(Finland) Risto Pietiläinen	(Japan) Mitsubishi Motors	Mitsubishi Lancer WRC 05	3:04:18.5	+3:26.4	5
5	4	(Norway) Henning Solberg	(Norway) Cato Menkerud	(United Kingdom) BP Ford World Rally Team	Ford Focus RS WRC '04	3:04:21.9	+3:29.8	4
6	19	(Sweden) Daniel Carlsson	(Sweden) Mattias Andersson	(France) Bozian Racing	Peugeot 307 WRC	3:04:34.6	+3:42.5	3
7	10	(Italy) Gianluigi Galli	(Italy) Guido D'Amore	(Japan) Mitsubishi Motors	Mitsubishi Lancer WRC 05	3:04:56.1	+4:04.0	2
8	17	(Czech Republic) Roman Kresta	(Czech Republic) Jan Tománek	(United Kingdom) BP Ford World Rally Team	Ford Focus RS WRC '04	3:05:31.7	+4:39.6	1

=== World Rally Cars ===
==== Classification ====
Position		No.	Driver	Co-driver	Entrant	Car	Time	Difference	Points
Event	Class	No.	Driver	Co-driver	Entrant	Car	Time	Difference	Points
1	1	5	(Norway) Petter Solberg	(United Kingdom) Phil Mills	(Japan) Subaru World Rally Team	Subaru Impreza S10 WRC '04	3:00:52.1		10
2	2	8	(Estonia) Markko Märtin	(United Kingdom) Michael Park	(France) Marlboro Peugeot Total	Peugeot 307 WRC	3:03:03.2	+2:11.1	8
3	3	3	(Finland) Toni Gardemeister	(Finland) Jakke Honkanen	(United Kingdom) BP Ford World Rally Team	Ford Focus RS WRC '04	3:04:06.8	+3:14.7	6
4	4	9	(Finland) Harri Rovanperä	(Finland) Risto Pietiläinen	(Japan) Mitsubishi Motors	Mitsubishi Lancer WRC 05	3:04:18.5	+3:26.4	5
5	5	4	(Norway) Henning Solberg	(Norway) Cato Menkerud	(United Kingdom) BP Ford World Rally Team	Ford Focus RS WRC '04	3:04:21.9	+3:29.8	4
7	6	10	(Italy) Gianluigi Galli	(Italy) Guido D'Amore	(Japan) Mitsubishi Motors	Mitsubishi Lancer WRC 05	3:04:56.1	+4:04.0	2
10	7	11	(Sweden) Mattias Ekström	(Sweden) Stefan Bergman	(Czech Republic) Škoda Motorsport	Škoda Fabia WRC	3:07:56.3	+7:04.2	0
12	8	2	(Belgium) François Duval	(Belgium) Stéphane Prévot	(France) Citroën Total WRT	Citroën Xsara WRC	3:08:11.7	+7:19.6	0
13	9	6	(France) Stéphane Sarrazin	(France) Denis Giraudet	(Japan) Subaru World Rally Team	Subaru Impreza S10 WRC '04	3:08:53.1	+8:01.0	0
Retired SS20		12	(Finland) Janne Tuohino	(Finland) Mikko Markkula	(Czech Republic) Škoda Motorsport	Škoda Fabia WRC	Suspension		0
Retired SS19		1	(France) Sébastien Loeb	(Monaco) Daniel Elena	(France) Citroën Total WRT	Citroën Xsara WRC	Engine		0
Retired SS16		7	(Finland) Marcus Grönholm	(Finland) Timo Rautiainen	(France) Marlboro Peugeot Total	Peugeot 307 WRC	Accident		0

==== Special stages ====
Day	Stage	Stage name	Length	Winner	Car	Time	Class leaders
1. leg (11 Feb)	SS1	Likenäs 1	21.78 km	(Norway) Petter Solberg	Subaru Impreza S10 WRC '04	12:16.3	(Norway) Petter Solberg
1. leg (11 Feb)	SS2	Hara 1	11.32 km	(Norway) Petter Solberg	Subaru Impreza S10 WRC '04	6:03.1	(Norway) Petter Solberg
1. leg (11 Feb)	SS3	Torntorp 1	19.21 km	(Finland) Marcus Grönholm	Peugeot 307 WRC	9:45.8	(Finland) Marcus Grönholm
1. leg (11 Feb)	SS4	Likenäs 2	21.78 km	(Finland) Marcus Grönholm	Peugeot 307 WRC	12:06.7	(Finland) Marcus Grönholm
1. leg (11 Feb)	SS5	Hara 2	11.32 km	(France) Sébastien Loeb	Citroën Xsara WRC	5:55.7	(Finland) Marcus Grönholm
1. leg (11 Feb)	SS6	Torntorp 2	19.21 km	(Italy) Gianluigi Galli	Mitsubishi Lancer WRC 05	9:47.6	(Norway) Petter Solberg
1. leg (11 Feb)	SS7	Hagfors Sprint 1	1.86 km	(France) Sébastien Loeb	Citroën Xsara WRC	2:05.1	(Finland) Marcus Grönholm
2. leg (12 Feb)	SS8	Sundsjön 1	20.78 km	(France) Sébastien Loeb	Citroën Xsara WRC	10:55.6	(Finland) Marcus Grönholm
2. leg (12 Feb)	SS9	Vargåsen 1	24.79 km	(Norway) Petter Solberg	Subaru Impreza S10 WRC '04	13:45.2	(Norway) Petter Solberg
2. leg (12 Feb)	SS10	Fredriksberg	20.13 km	(Finland) Marcus Grönholm	Peugeot 307 WRC	11:26.3	(Norway) Petter Solberg
2. leg (12 Feb)	SS11	Lejen	26.40 km	(Finland) Marcus Grönholm	Peugeot 307 WRC	13:25.4	(Finland) Marcus Grönholm
2. leg (12 Feb)	SS12	Sundsjön 2	20.78 km	(France) Sébastien Loeb	Citroën Xsara WRC	10:37.8	(Finland) Marcus Grönholm
2. leg (12 Feb)	SS13	Vargåsen 2	24.79 km	(Norway) Petter Solberg	Subaru Impreza S10 WRC '04	13:36.0	(Norway) Petter Solberg
2. leg (12 Feb)	SS14	Hagfors Sprint 2	1.86 km	(Norway) Petter Solberg	Subaru Impreza S10 WRC '04	2:01.9	(Norway) Petter Solberg
3. leg (13 Feb)	SS15	Lesjöfors 1	10.17 km	(Norway) Petter Solberg	Subaru Impreza S10 WRC '04	5:32.2	(Norway) Petter Solberg
3. leg (13 Feb)	SS16	Rämmen 1	23.35 km	(Estonia) Markko Märtin	Peugeot 307 WRC	11:58.0	(Norway) Petter Solberg
3. leg (13 Feb)	SS17	Malta 1	11.25 km	(Estonia) Markko Märtin	Peugeot 307 WRC	5:35.5	(Norway) Petter Solberg
3. leg (13 Feb)	SS18	Lesjöfors 2	10.17 km	(Sweden) Daniel Carlsson	Peugeot 307 WRC	5:31.8	(Norway) Petter Solberg
3. leg (13 Feb)	SS19	Rämmen 2	23.35 km	(Sweden) Daniel Carlsson	Peugeot 307 WRC	11:44.1	(Norway) Petter Solberg
3. leg (13 Feb)	SS20	Malta 2	11.25 km	(Finland) Harri Rovanperä	Mitsubishi Lancer WRC 05	5:34.9	(Norway) Petter Solberg

==== Championship standings ====
Pos.	Drivers' championships			Co-drivers' championships			Manufacturers' championships		
Pos.	Move	Driver	Points	Move	Co-driver	Points	Move	Manufacturer	Points
1	1	(Finland) Toni Gardemeister	14	1	(Finland) Jakke Honkanen	14	1	(United Kingdom) BP Ford World Rally Team	20
2	2	(Estonia) Markko Märtin	13	2	(United Kingdom) Michael Park	13	2	(France) Marlboro Peugeot Total	17
3	2	(France) Sébastien Loeb	10	2	(Monaco) Daniel Elena	10		(Japan) Mitsubishi Motors	17
4	New entry	(Norway) Petter Solberg	10	New entry	(United Kingdom) Phil Mills	10	3	(France) Citroën Total WRT	11
5	2	(Finland) Harri Rovanperä	7	2	(Finland) Risto Pietiläinen	7	New entry	(Japan) Subaru World Rally Team	10

=== Production World Rally Championship ===
==== Classification ====
Position		No.	Driver	Co-driver	Entrant	Car	Time	Difference	Points
Event	Class	No.	Driver	Co-driver	Entrant	Car	Time	Difference	Points
17	1	31	(Japan) Toshihiro Arai	(New Zealand) Tony Sircombe	(United Kingdom) Subaru Team Arai	Subaru Impreza STI N11	3:15:51.9		10
31	2	43	(Italy) Angelo Medeghini	(Italy) Barbara Capoferri	(Italy) Angelo Medeghini	Mitsubishi Lancer Evo VIII	3:33:40.9	+17:49.0	8
32	3	38	(Italy) Fabio Frisiero	(Italy) Giovanni Agnese	(Italy) Fabio Frisiero	Subaru Impreza STI N11	3:34:05.6	+18:13.7	6
38	4	32	(Spain) Xavier Pons	(Spain) Oriol Julià Pascual	(Spain) Xavier Pons	Mitsubishi Lancer Evo VIII	3:46:50.2	+30:58.3	5
43	5	34	(Japan) Fumio Nutahara	(Japan) Satoshi Hayashi	(Japan) Advan-Piaa Rally Team	Mitsubishi Lancer Evo VIII	3:54:47.0	+38:55.1	4
46	6	45	(Italy) Riccardo Errani	(Italy) Stefano Casadio	(Italy) Riccardo Errani	Mitsubishi Lancer Evo VIII	4:16:24.1	+1:00:32.2	3
Retired SS19		50	(Finland) Aki Teiskonen	(Finland) Miika Teiskonen	(Japan) Syms Rally Team	Subaru Impreza STI	Accident		0
Retired SS8		37	(United Kingdom) Mark Higgins	(United Kingdom) Trevor Agnew	(United Kingdom) Mark Higgins	Subaru Impreza STI N11	Engine		0
Retired SS3		39	(Sweden) Joakim Roman	(Sweden) Bosse Holmstrand	(Sweden) Joakim Roman	Subaru Impreza STI N10	Engine		0

==== Special stages ====
Day	Stage	Stage name	Length	Winner	Car	Time	Class leaders
1. leg (11 Feb)	SS1	Likenäs 1	21.78 km	(Japan) Toshihiro Arai	Subaru Impreza STI N11	13:16.6	(Japan) Toshihiro Arai
1. leg (11 Feb)	SS2	Hara 1	11.32 km	(Japan) Toshihiro Arai	Subaru Impreza STI N11	6:33.9	(Japan) Toshihiro Arai
1. leg (11 Feb)	SS3	Torntorp 1	19.21 km	(Japan) Toshihiro Arai	Subaru Impreza STI N11	10:35.8	(Japan) Toshihiro Arai
1. leg (11 Feb)	SS4	Likenäs 2	21.78 km	(Japan) Toshihiro Arai	Subaru Impreza STI N11	13:10.6	(Japan) Toshihiro Arai
1. leg (11 Feb)	SS5	Hara 2	11.32 km	(United Kingdom) Mark Higgins	Subaru Impreza STI N11	6:29.8	(Japan) Toshihiro Arai
1. leg (11 Feb)	SS6	Torntorp 2	19.21 km	(Japan) Toshihiro Arai	Subaru Impreza STI N11	10:34.2	(Japan) Toshihiro Arai
1. leg (11 Feb)	SS7	Hagfors Sprint 1	1.86 km	(Japan) Toshihiro Arai	Subaru Impreza STI N11	2:12.4	(Japan) Toshihiro Arai
2. leg (12 Feb)	SS8	Sundsjön 1	20.78 km	(Japan) Toshihiro Arai	Subaru Impreza STI N11	11:56.9	(Japan) Toshihiro Arai
2. leg (12 Feb)	SS9	Vargåsen 1	24.79 km	(Japan) Toshihiro Arai	Subaru Impreza STI N11	14:55.1	(Japan) Toshihiro Arai
2. leg (12 Feb)	SS10	Fredriksberg	20.13 km	(Finland) Aki Teiskonen	Subaru Impreza STI	12:20.1	(Japan) Toshihiro Arai
2. leg (12 Feb)	SS11	Lejen	26.40 km	(Finland) Aki Teiskonen	Subaru Impreza STI	14:44.4	(Japan) Toshihiro Arai
2. leg (12 Feb)	SS12	Sundsjön 2	20.78 km	(Japan) Toshihiro Arai	Subaru Impreza STI N11	11:43.6	(Japan) Toshihiro Arai
2. leg (12 Feb)	SS13	Vargåsen 2	24.79 km	(Japan) Toshihiro Arai	Subaru Impreza STI N11	14:47.8	(Japan) Toshihiro Arai
2. leg (12 Feb)	SS14	Hagfors Sprint 2	1.86 km	(Spain) Xavier Pons (Japan) Fumio Nutahara	Mitsubishi Lancer Evo VIII; Mitsubishi Lancer Evo VIII	2:08.7	(Japan) Toshihiro Arai
3. leg (13 Feb)	SS15	Lesjöfors 1	10.17 km	(Japan) Toshihiro Arai	Subaru Impreza STI N11	6:07.8	(Japan) Toshihiro Arai
3. leg (13 Feb)	SS16	Rämmen 1	23.35 km	(Japan) Toshihiro Arai	Subaru Impreza STI N11	12:54.4	(Japan) Toshihiro Arai
3. leg (13 Feb)	SS17	Malta 1	11.25 km	(Spain) Xavier Pons	Mitsubishi Lancer Evo VIII	6:08.8	(Japan) Toshihiro Arai
3. leg (13 Feb)	SS18	Lesjöfors 2	10.17 km	(Spain) Xavier Pons	Mitsubishi Lancer Evo VIII	6:05.8	(Japan) Toshihiro Arai
3. leg (13 Feb)	SS19	Rämmen 2	23.35 km	(Japan) Toshihiro Arai	Subaru Impreza STI N11	12:47.0	(Japan) Toshihiro Arai
3. leg (13 Feb)	SS20	Malta 2	11.25 km	(Japan) Toshihiro Arai	Subaru Impreza STI N11	6:09.1	(Japan) Toshihiro Arai

==== Championship standings ====
Pos.	Drivers' championships		
Pos.	Move	Driver	Points
1	New entry	(Japan) Toshihiro Arai	10
2	New entry	(Italy) Angelo Medeghini	8
3	New entry	(Italy) Fabio Frisiero	6
4	New entry	(Spain) Xavier Pons	5
5	New entry	(Japan) Fumio Nutahara	4
