= 2003 Swedish Rally =

2nd round of the 2003 World Rally Championship

2003 Swedish Rally 52nd Uddeholm Swedish Rally
Round 2 of the 2003 World Rally Championship season
← Previous event	Next event →
- Host country: Sweden
- Rally base: Karlstad
- Dates run: February 7, 2003 – February 9, 2003
- Stages: 17 (386.91 km; 240.41 miles)
- Stage surface: Snow
- Overall distance: 1,903.47 km (1,182.76 miles)

Statistics
- Crews: 75 at start, 53 at finish

Overall results
- Overall winner: (Finland) Marcus Grönholm (Finland) Timo Rautiainen (France) Marlboro Peugeot Total; Peugeot 206 WRC

The 2003 Swedish Rally (formally the 52nd Uddeholm Swedish Rally) was the second round of the 2003 World Rally Championship. The race was held over three days between 7 February and 9 February 2003, and was based in Karlstad, Sweden. Peugeot's Marcus Grönholm won the race, his 13th win in the World Rally Championship.

== Background ==
=== Entry list ===
No.	Driver	Co-Driver	Entrant	Car	Tyre
World Rally Championship manufacturer entries
1	(Finland) Marcus Grönholm	(Finland) Timo Rautiainen	(France) Marlboro Peugeot Total	Peugeot 206 WRC	MI
2	(United Kingdom) Richard Burns	(United Kingdom) Robert Reid	(France) Marlboro Peugeot Total	Peugeot 206 WRC	MI
3	(Finland) Harri Rovanperä	(Finland) Risto Pietiläinen	(France) Marlboro Peugeot Total	Peugeot 206 WRC	MI
4	(Estonia) Markko Märtin	(United Kingdom) Michael Park	(United Kingdom) Ford Motor Co. Ltd.	Ford Focus RS WRC '02	MI
5	(Belgium) François Duval	(Belgium) Jean-Marc Fortin	(United Kingdom) Ford Motor Co. Ltd.	Ford Focus RS WRC '02	MI
6	(Finland) Mikko Hirvonen	(Finland) Jarmo Lehtinen	(United Kingdom) Ford Motor Co. Ltd.	Ford Focus RS WRC '02	MI
7	(Norway) Petter Solberg	(United Kingdom) Phil Mills	(Japan) 555 Subaru World Rally Team	Subaru Impreza S9 WRC '03	P
8	(Finland) Tommi Mäkinen	(Finland) Kaj Lindström	(Japan) 555 Subaru World Rally Team	Subaru Impreza S9 WRC '03	P
10	(Germany) Armin Schwarz	(Germany) Manfred Hiemer	(South Korea) Hyundai World Rally Team	Hyundai Accent WRC3	MI
11	(Belgium) Freddy Loix	(Belgium) Sven Smeets	(South Korea) Hyundai World Rally Team	Hyundai Accent WRC3	MI
12	(Finland) Jussi Välimäki	(Finland) Tero Gardemeister	(South Korea) Hyundai World Rally Team	Hyundai Accent WRC3	MI
14	(France) Didier Auriol	(France) Denis Giraudet	(Czech Republic) Škoda Motorsport	Škoda Octavia WRC Evo3	MI
15	(Finland) Toni Gardemeister	(Finland) Paavo Lukander	(Czech Republic) Škoda Motorsport	Škoda Octavia WRC Evo3	MI
17	(United Kingdom) Colin McRae	(United Kingdom) Derek Ringer	(France) Citroën Total WRT	Citroën Xsara WRC	MI
18	(France) Sébastien Loeb	(Monaco) Daniel Elena	(France) Citroën Total WRT	Citroën Xsara WRC	MI
19	(Spain) Carlos Sainz	(Spain) Marc Martí	(France) Citroën Total WRT	Citroën Xsara WRC	MI
World Rally Championship entries
21	(Finland) Janne Tuohino	(Finland) Jukka Aho	(Finland) Janne Tuohino	Ford Focus RS WRC '02	MI
22	(Poland) Tomasz Kuchar	(Poland) Maciek Szczepaniak	(Poland) Tomasz Kuchar	Ford Focus RS WRC '02	MI
23	(Finland) Jari Viita	(Finland) Teppo Leino	(Finland) Wrüth Sport	Ford Focus RS WRC '01	MI
24	(Czech Republic) Roman Kresta	(Czech Republic) Miloš Hůlka	(France) Bozian Racing	Peugeot 206 WRC	MI
25	(Germany) Antony Warmbold	(United Kingdom) Gemma Price	(Germany) AW Rally Team	Ford Focus RS WRC '02	MI
32	(Finland) Juuso Pykälistö	(Finland) Esko Mertsalmi	(Finland) Juuso Pykälistö	Peugeot 206 WRC	MI
34	(Norway) Henning Solberg	(Norway) Cato Menkerud	(Norway) Henning Solberg	Mitsubishi Lancer Evo VI	—N/a
35	(Finland) Kristian Sohlberg	(Finland) Jakke Honkanen	(Finland) Kristian Sohlberg	Mitsubishi Lancer WRC2	MI
100	(Norway) Rune Dalsjø	(Sweden) Göran Bergsten	(Norway) Rune Dalsjø	Mitsubishi Lancer Evo VI	—N/a
101	(Norway) Kristian Kolberg	(Norway) Kjell Pettersen	(Norway) Kristian Kolberg	Hyundai Accent WRC2	—N/a
102	(Sweden) Andreas Eriksson	(Sweden) Patrick Henriksson	(Sweden) Andreas Eriksson	Ford Focus RS WRC '02	P
103	(Norway) Thomas Kolberg	(Norway) Pål Christian Iversen	(Norway) Thomas Kolberg	Hyundai Accent WRC2	C
113	(Norway) Tord Linnerud	(Norway) Henning Isdal	(Norway) Tord Linnerud	Toyota Corolla WRC	—N/a
114	(Norway) Thomas Schie	(Norway) Ragnar Engen	(Norway) Thomas Schie	Toyota Corolla WRC	MI
116	(Greece) Ioannis Papadimitriou	(United Kingdom) Allan Harryman	(Greece) Ioannis Papadimitriou	Ford Focus RS WRC'01	—N/a
117	(Slovakia) Jozef Béreš Jr.	(Czech Republic) Petr Starý	(Slovakia) Styllex Tuning Motorsport	Toyota Corolla WRC	—N/a
PWRC entries
51	(Malaysia) Karamjit Singh	(Malaysia) Allen Oh	(Malaysia) Petronas EON Racing Team	Proton Pert	—N/a
54	(Japan) Toshihiro Arai	(New Zealand) Tony Sircombe	(Japan) Subaru Production Rally Team	Subaru Impreza WRX STI N8	—N/a
55	(United Kingdom) Martin Rowe	(United Kingdom) Trevor Agnew	(United Kingdom) David Sutton Cars Ltd	Subaru Impreza WRX STI N8	—N/a
59	(Italy) Stefano Marrini	(Italy) Massimo Agostinelli	(Italy) Top Run SRL	Mitsubishi Lancer Evo VII	—N/a
61	(Poland) Janusz Kulig	(Poland) Jarosław Baran	Mobil 1 Team Poland	Mitsubishi Lancer Evo VI	MI
62	(New Zealand) Peter 'Possum' Bourne	(Australia) Mark Stacey	(Japan) Subaru Production Rally Team	Subaru Impreza WRX STI N8	—N/a
63	(Italy) Luca Baldini	(Italy) Alessandro Floris	(Italy) Top Run SRL	Mitsubishi Lancer Evo VI	—N/a
64	(Sweden) Joakim Roman	(Sweden) Ingrid Mitakidou	(Sweden) Milbrooks World Rally Team	Mitsubishi Lancer Evo V	—N/a
65	(Sweden) Stig Blomqvist	(Venezuela) Ana Goñi	(United Kingdom) David Sutton Cars Ltd	Subaru Impreza WRX STI N8	—N/a
67	(Poland) Krzysztof Hołowczyc	(Poland) Łukasz Kurzeja	(Poland) Orlen Team	Mitsubishi Lancer Evo VII	MI
69	(Belgium) Bob Colsoul	(Belgium) Tom Colsoul	(Belgium) Guy Colsoul Rallysport	Mitsubishi Lancer Evo VII	—N/a
71	(Bulgaria) Georgi Geradzhiev Jr.	(Bulgaria) Nikola Popov	(Bulgaria) Racing Team Bulgartabac	Mitsubishi Lancer Evo VI	—N/a
72	(Romania) Constantin Aur	(Romania) Silviu Moraru	(Austria) Stohl Racing	Mitsubishi Lancer Evo VII	—N/a
74	(Italy) Fabio Frisiero	(Italy) Loris Roggia	(Italy) Motoring Club	Mitsubishi Lancer Evo VI	—N/a
76	(Canada) Patrick Richard	(United Kingdom) Martin Headland	Subaru Rally Team Canada	Subaru Impreza WRX STI N8	—N/a
77	(Italy) Alfredo De Dominicis	(Italy) Giovanni Bernacchini	Ralliart Italy	Mitsubishi Lancer Evo VI	—N/a
78	(Poland) Łukasz Sztuka	(Sweden) Per Carlsson	(Belgium) First Motorsport	Mitsubishi Lancer Evo VII	—N/a
80	(Mexico) Ricardo Triviño	(Spain) Jordi Barrabés	(Mexico) Triviño Racing	Mitsubishi Lancer Evo VII	—N/a

=== Itinerary ===
All dates and times are CET (UTC+1).

Date	Time	No.	Stage name	Distance
Leg 1 — 125.79 km
7 February	08:35	SS1	Sågen 1	14.17 km
7 February	09:27	SS2	Rämmen 1	23.16 km
7 February	11:55	SS3	Granberget 1	43.69 km
7 February	14:28	SS4	Malta	11.25 km
7 February	15:25	SS5	Brunnberg 1	31.66 km
7 February	16:26	SS6	Hagfors Sprint 1	1.86 km
Leg 2 — 140.37 km
8 February	08:18	SS7	Granberget 2	43.69 km
8 February	11:24	SS8	Fredriksberg	18.14 km
8 February	12:07	SS9	Lejen	25.04 km
8 February	14:37	SS10	Vargåsen	32.43 km
8 February	15:35	SS11	Torntorp	19.21 km
8 February	16:40	SS12	Hagfors Sprint 2	1.86 km
Leg 3 — 120.75 km
9 February	08:35	SS13	Sågen 2	14.17 km
9 February	09:27	SS14	Rämmen 2	23.16 km
9 February	11:14	SS15	Hara	11.91 km
9 February	12:12	SS16	Brunnberg 2	31.66 km
9 February	14:35	SS17	Hagfors	39.85 km

== Results ==
=== Overall ===
Pos.	No.	Driver	Co-driver	Team	Car	Time	Difference	Points
1	1	(Finland) Marcus Grönholm	(Finland) Timo Rautiainen	(France) Marlboro Peugeot Total	Peugeot 206 WRC	3:03:28.1		10
2	8	(Finland) Tommi Mäkinen	(Finland) Kaj Lindström	(Japan) 555 Subaru World Rally Team	Subaru Impreza S9 WRC '03	3:04:18.9	+50.8	8
3	2	(United Kingdom) Richard Burns	(United Kingdom) Robert Reid	(France) Marlboro Peugeot Total	Peugeot 206 WRC	3:04:46.0	+1:17.9	6
4	4	(Estonia) Markko Märtin	(United Kingdom) Michael Park	(United Kingdom) Ford Motor Co. Ltd.	Ford Focus RS WRC '02	3:05:13.9	+1:45.8	5
5	17	(United Kingdom) Colin McRae	(United Kingdom) Derek Ringer	(France) Citroën Total WRT	Citroën Xsara WRC	3:05:43.9	+2:15.8	4
6	7	(Norway) Petter Solberg	(United Kingdom) Phil Mills	(Japan) 555 Subaru World Rally Team	Subaru Impreza S9 WRC '03	3:05:47.2	+2:19.1	3
7	18	(France) Sébastien Loeb	(Monaco) Daniel Elena	(France) Citroën Total WRT	Citroën Xsara WRC	3:06:42.8	+3:14.7	2
8	15	(Finland) Toni Gardemeister	(Finland) Paavo Lukander	(Czech Republic) Škoda Motorsport	Škoda Octavia WRC Evo3	3:06:47.3	+3:19.2	1

=== World Rally Cars ===
==== Classification ====
Position		No.	Driver	Co-driver	Entrant	Car	Time	Difference	Points
Event	Class	No.	Driver	Co-driver	Entrant	Car	Time	Difference	Points
1	1	1	(Finland) Marcus Grönholm	(Finland) Timo Rautiainen	(France) Marlboro Peugeot Total	Peugeot 206 WRC	3:03:28.1		10
2	2	8	(Finland) Tommi Mäkinen	(Finland) Kaj Lindström	(Japan) 555 Subaru World Rally Team	Subaru Impreza S9 WRC '03	3:04:18.9	+50.8	8
3	3	2	(United Kingdom) Richard Burns	(United Kingdom) Robert Reid	(France) Marlboro Peugeot Total	Peugeot 206 WRC	3:04:46.0	+1:17.9	6
4	4	4	(Estonia) Markko Märtin	(United Kingdom) Michael Park	(United Kingdom) Ford Motor Co. Ltd.	Ford Focus RS WRC '02	3:05:13.9	+1:45.8	5
5	5	17	(United Kingdom) Colin McRae	(United Kingdom) Derek Ringer	(France) Citroën Total WRT	Citroën Xsara WRC	3:05:43.9	+2:15.8	4
6	6	7	(Norway) Petter Solberg	(United Kingdom) Phil Mills	(Japan) 555 Subaru World Rally Team	Subaru Impreza S9 WRC '03	3:05:47.2	+2:19.1	3
7	7	18	(France) Sébastien Loeb	(Monaco) Daniel Elena	(France) Citroën Total WRT	Citroën Xsara WRC	3:06:42.8	+3:14.7	2
8	8	15	(Finland) Toni Gardemeister	(Finland) Paavo Lukander	(Czech Republic) Škoda Motorsport	Škoda Octavia WRC Evo3	3:06:47.3	+3:19.2	1
9	9	19	(Spain) Carlos Sainz	(Spain) Marc Martí	(France) Citroën Total WRT	Citroën Xsara WRC	3:06:52.3	+3:24.2	0
10	10	11	(Belgium) Freddy Loix	(Belgium) Sven Smeets	(South Korea) Hyundai World Rally Team	Hyundai Accent WRC3	3:07:04.5	+3:36.4	0
11	11	6	(Finland) Mikko Hirvonen	(Finland) Jarmo Lehtinen	(United Kingdom) Ford Motor Co. Ltd.	Ford Focus RS WRC '02	3:09:33.8	+6:05.7	0
13	12	10	(Germany) Armin Schwarz	(Germany) Manfred Hiemer	(South Korea) Hyundai World Rally Team	Hyundai Accent WRC3	3:10:49.3	+7:21.2	0
18	13	14	(France) Didier Auriol	(France) Denis Giraudet	(Czech Republic) Škoda Motorsport	Škoda Octavia WRC Evo3	3:16:14.9	+12:46.8	0
Retired SS8		3	(Finland) Harri Rovanperä	(Finland) Risto Pietiläinen	(France) Marlboro Peugeot Total	Peugeot 206 WRC	Accident		0
Retired SS7		12	(Finland) Jussi Välimäki	(Finland) Tero Gardemeister	(South Korea) Hyundai World Rally Team	Hyundai Accent WRC3	Transmission		0
Retired SS6		5	(Belgium) François Duval	(Belgium) Jean-Marc Fortin	(United Kingdom) Ford Motor Co. Ltd.	Ford Focus RS WRC '02	Engine		0

==== Special stages ====
Day	Stage	Stage name	Length	Winner	Car	Time	Class leaders
Leg 1 (7 Feb)	SS1	Sågen 1	14.17 km	(France) Sébastien Loeb	Citroën Xsara WRC	7:25.6	(France) Sébastien Loeb
Leg 1 (7 Feb)	SS2	Rämmen 1	23.16 km	(Finland) Marcus Grönholm	Peugeot 206 WRC	12:05.5	(Finland) Marcus Grönholm
Leg 1 (7 Feb)	SS3	Granberget 1	43.69 km	(Finland) Marcus Grönholm	Peugeot 206 WRC	21:43.9	(Finland) Marcus Grönholm
Leg 1 (7 Feb)	SS4	Malta	11.25 km	(Finland) Marcus Grönholm	Peugeot 206 WRC	5:39.1	(Finland) Marcus Grönholm
Leg 1 (7 Feb)	SS5	Brunnberg 1	31.66 km	Stage cancelled			(Finland) Marcus Grönholm
Leg 1 (7 Feb)	SS6	Hagfors Sprint 1	1.86 km	(United Kingdom) Richard Burns	Peugeot 206 WRC	1:58.0	(Finland) Marcus Grönholm
Leg 2 (8 Feb)	SS7	Granberget 2	43.69 km	(Finland) Harri Rovanperä	Peugeot 206 WRC	21:28.0	(Finland) Marcus Grönholm
Leg 2 (8 Feb)	SS8	Fredriksberg	18.14 km	Notional stage time			(Finland) Marcus Grönholm
Leg 2 (8 Feb)	SS9	Lejen	25.04 km	(Finland) Marcus Grönholm	Peugeot 206 WRC	11:56.2	(Finland) Marcus Grönholm
Leg 2 (8 Feb)	SS10	Vargåsen	32.43 km	(Finland) Marcus Grönholm	Peugeot 206 WRC	18:08.7	(Finland) Marcus Grönholm
Leg 2 (8 Feb)	SS11	Torntorp	19.21 km	(Finland) Marcus Grönholm	Peugeot 206 WRC	10:12.7	(Finland) Marcus Grönholm
Leg 2 (8 Feb)	SS12	Hagfors Sprint 2	1.86 km	(Finland) Tommi Mäkinen	Subaru Impreza S9 WRC '03	1:56.8	(Finland) Marcus Grönholm
Leg 3 (9 Feb)	SS13	Sågen 2	14.17 km	(Finland) Tommi Mäkinen	Subaru Impreza S9 WRC '03	7:19.1	(Finland) Marcus Grönholm
Leg 3 (9 Feb)	SS14	Rämmen 2	23.16 km	(Finland) Marcus Grönholm	Peugeot 206 WRC	11:41.4	(Finland) Marcus Grönholm
Leg 3 (9 Feb)	SS15	Hara	11.91 km	(United Kingdom) Colin McRae	Citroën Xsara WRC	5:55.4	(Finland) Marcus Grönholm
Leg 3 (9 Feb)	SS16	Brunnberg 2	31.66 km	(Estonia) Markko Märtin	Ford Focus RS WRC '02	15:08.7	(Finland) Marcus Grönholm
Leg 3 (9 Feb)	SS17	Hagfors	39.85 km	(Norway) Petter Solberg	Subaru Impreza S9 WRC '03	19:40.0	(Finland) Marcus Grönholm

==== Championship standings ====
Pos.	Drivers' championships			Co-drivers' championships			Manufacturers' championships		
Pos.	Move	Driver	Points	Move	Co-driver	Points	Move	Manufacturer	Points
1		(France) Sébastien Loeb	12		(Monaco) Daniel Elena	12		(France) Citroën Total WRT	24
2		(United Kingdom) Colin McRae	12		(United Kingdom) Derek Ringer	12	1	(France) Marlboro Peugeot Total	22
3	New entry	(Finland) Marcus Grönholm	10	New entry	(Finland) Timo Rautiainen	10	1	(United Kingdom) Ford Motor Co. Ltd.	15
4	1	(United Kingdom) Richard Burns	10	1	(United Kingdom) Robert Reid	10	New entry	(Japan) 555 Subaru World Rally Team	11
5	1	(Estonia) Markko Märtin	10	1	(United Kingdom) Michael Park	10	1	(South Korea) Hyundai World Rally Team	3

=== Production World Rally Championship ===
==== Classification ====
Position		No.	Driver	Co-driver	Entrant	Car	Time	Difference	Points
Event	Class	No.	Driver	Co-driver	Entrant	Car	Time	Difference	Points
26	1	65	(Sweden) Stig Blomqvist	(Venezuela) Ana Goñi	(United Kingdom) David Sutton Cars Ltd	Subaru Impreza WRX STI N8	3:22:28.2		10
27	2	51	(Malaysia) Karamjit Singh	(Malaysia) Allen Oh	(Malaysia) Petronas EON Racing Team	Proton Pert	3:23:00.0	+31.8	8
29	3	55	(United Kingdom) Martin Rowe	(United Kingdom) Trevor Agnew	(United Kingdom) David Sutton Cars Ltd	Subaru Impreza WRX STI N8	3:24:20.9	+1:52.7	6
31	4	62	(New Zealand) Peter 'Possum' Bourne	(Australia) Mark Stacey	(Japan) Subaru Production Rally Team	Subaru Impreza WRX STI N8	3:24:28.7	+2:00.5	5
33	5	67	(Poland) Krzysztof Hołowczyc	(Poland) Łukasz Kurzeja	(Poland) Orlen Team	Mitsubishi Lancer Evo VII	3:28:38.0	+6:09.8	4
37	6	64	(Sweden) Joakim Roman	(Sweden) Ingrid Mitakidou	(Sweden) Milbrooks World Rally Team	Mitsubishi Lancer Evo V	3:33:06.0	+10:37.8	3
38	7	78	(Poland) Łukasz Sztuka	(Sweden) Per Carlsson	(Belgium) First Motorsport	Mitsubishi Lancer Evo VII	3:34:06.9	+11:38.7	2
41	8	76	(Canada) Patrick Richard	(United Kingdom) Martin Headland	Subaru Rally Team Canada	Subaru Impreza WRX STI N8	3:35:56.3	+13:28.1	1
42	9	69	(Belgium) Bob Colsoul	(Belgium) Tom Colsoul	(Belgium) Guy Colsoul Rallysport	Mitsubishi Lancer Evo VII	3:36:06.3	+13:38.1	0
44	10	77	(Italy) Alfredo De Dominicis	(Italy) Giovanni Bernacchini	Ralliart Italy	Mitsubishi Lancer Evo VI	3:37:52.6	+15:24.4	0
45	11	63	(Italy) Luca Baldini	(Italy) Alessandro Floris	(Italy) Top Run SRL	Mitsubishi Lancer Evo VI	3:38:37.9	+16:09.7	0
46	12	74	(Italy) Fabio Frisiero	(Italy) Loris Roggia	(Italy) Motoring Club	Mitsubishi Lancer Evo VI	3:42:52.3	+20:24.1	0
53	13	71	(Bulgaria) Georgi Geradzhiev Jr.	(Bulgaria) Nikola Popov	(Bulgaria) Racing Team Bulgartabac	Mitsubishi Lancer Evo VI	4:04:34.5	+42:06.3	0
Retired SS17		61	(Poland) Janusz Kulig	(Poland) Jarosław Baran	Mobil 1 Team Poland	Mitsubishi Lancer Evo VI	Excluded		0
Retired SS17		80	(Mexico) Ricardo Triviño	(Spain) Jordi Barrabés	(Mexico) Triviño Racing	Mitsubishi Lancer Evo VII	Accident		0
Retired SS16		54	(Japan) Toshihiro Arai	(New Zealand) Tony Sircombe	(Japan) Subaru Production Rally Team	Subaru Impreza WRX STI N8	Engine		0
Retired SS13		72	(Romania) Constantin Aur	(Romania) Silviu Moraru	(Austria) Stohl Racing	Mitsubishi Lancer Evo VII	Transmission		0
Retired SS2		59	(Italy) Stefano Marrini	(Italy) Massimo Agotinelli	(Italy) Top Run SRL	Mitsubishi Lancer Evo VII	Engine		0

==== Special stages ====
Day	Stage	Stage name	Length	Winner	Car	Time	Class leaders
Leg 1 (7 February)	SS1	Sågen 1	14.17 km	(Japan) Toshihiro Arai	Subaru Impreza WRX STI N8	8:14.2	(Japan) Toshihiro Arai
Leg 1 (7 February)	SS2	Rämmen 1	23.16 km	Notional stage time			(Japan) Toshihiro Arai
Leg 1 (7 February)	SS3	Granberget 1	43.69 km	(Japan) Toshihiro Arai	Subaru Impreza WRX STI N8	23:47.5	(Japan) Toshihiro Arai
Leg 1 (7 February)	SS4	Malta	11.25 km	(Sweden) Stig Blomqvist	Subaru Impreza WRX STI N8	6:16.8	(Japan) Toshihiro Arai
Leg 1 (7 February)	SS5	Brunnberg 1	31.66 km	Stage cancelled			(Japan) Toshihiro Arai
Leg 1 (7 February)	SS6	Hagfors Sprint 1	1.86 km	(Sweden) Stig Blomqvist	Subaru Impreza WRX STI N8	2:07.5	(Japan) Toshihiro Arai
Leg 2 (8 February)	SS7	Granberget 2	43.69 km	(Japan) Toshihiro Arai	Subaru Impreza WRX STI N8	23:28.0	(Japan) Toshihiro Arai
Leg 2 (8 February)	SS8	Fredriksberg	18.14 km	Notional stage time			(Japan) Toshihiro Arai
Leg 2 (8 February)	SS9	Lejen	25.04 km	(Japan) Toshihiro Arai	Subaru Impreza WRX STI N8	13:10.6	(Japan) Toshihiro Arai
Leg 2 (8 February)	SS10	Vargåsen	32.43 km	(Japan) Toshihiro Arai	Subaru Impreza WRX STI N8	19:57.6	(Japan) Toshihiro Arai
Leg 2 (8 February)	SS11	Torntorp	19.21 km	(Poland) Janusz Kulig	Mitsubishi Lancer Evo VI	11:12.8	(Japan) Toshihiro Arai
Leg 2 (8 February)	SS12	Hagfors Sprint 2	1.86 km	(Japan) Toshihiro Arai	Subaru Impreza WRX STI N8	2:06.7	(Japan) Toshihiro Arai
Leg 3 (9 February)	SS13	Sågen 2	14.17 km	(Japan) Toshihiro Arai	Subaru Impreza WRX STI N8	8:07.8	(Japan) Toshihiro Arai
Leg 3 (9 February)	SS14	Rämmen 2	23.16 km	(Sweden) Stig Blomqvist	Subaru Impreza WRX STI N8	12:51.5	(Japan) Toshihiro Arai
Leg 3 (9 February)	SS15	Hara	11.91 km	(Malaysia) Karamjit Singh	Proton Pert	6:37.2	(Japan) Toshihiro Arai
Leg 3 (9 February)	SS16	Brunnberg 2	31.66 km	(Poland) Janusz Kulig	Mitsubishi Lancer Evo VI	16:44.2	(Sweden) Stig Blomqvist
Leg 3 (9 February)	SS17	Hagfors	39.85 km	(Poland) Janusz Kulig	Mitsubishi Lancer Evo VI	21:38.7	(Sweden) Stig Blomqvist

==== Championship standings ====
Pos.	Drivers' championships		
Pos.	Move	Driver	Points
1	New entry	(Sweden) Stig Blomqvist	10
2	New entry	(Malaysia) Karamjit Singh	8
3	New entry	(United Kingdom) Martin Rowe	6
4	New entry	(New Zealand) Peter 'Possum' Bourne	5
5	New entry	(Poland) Krzysztof Hołowczyc	4
