= Jarmo Lehtinen =

Finnish rally co-driver (born 1969)

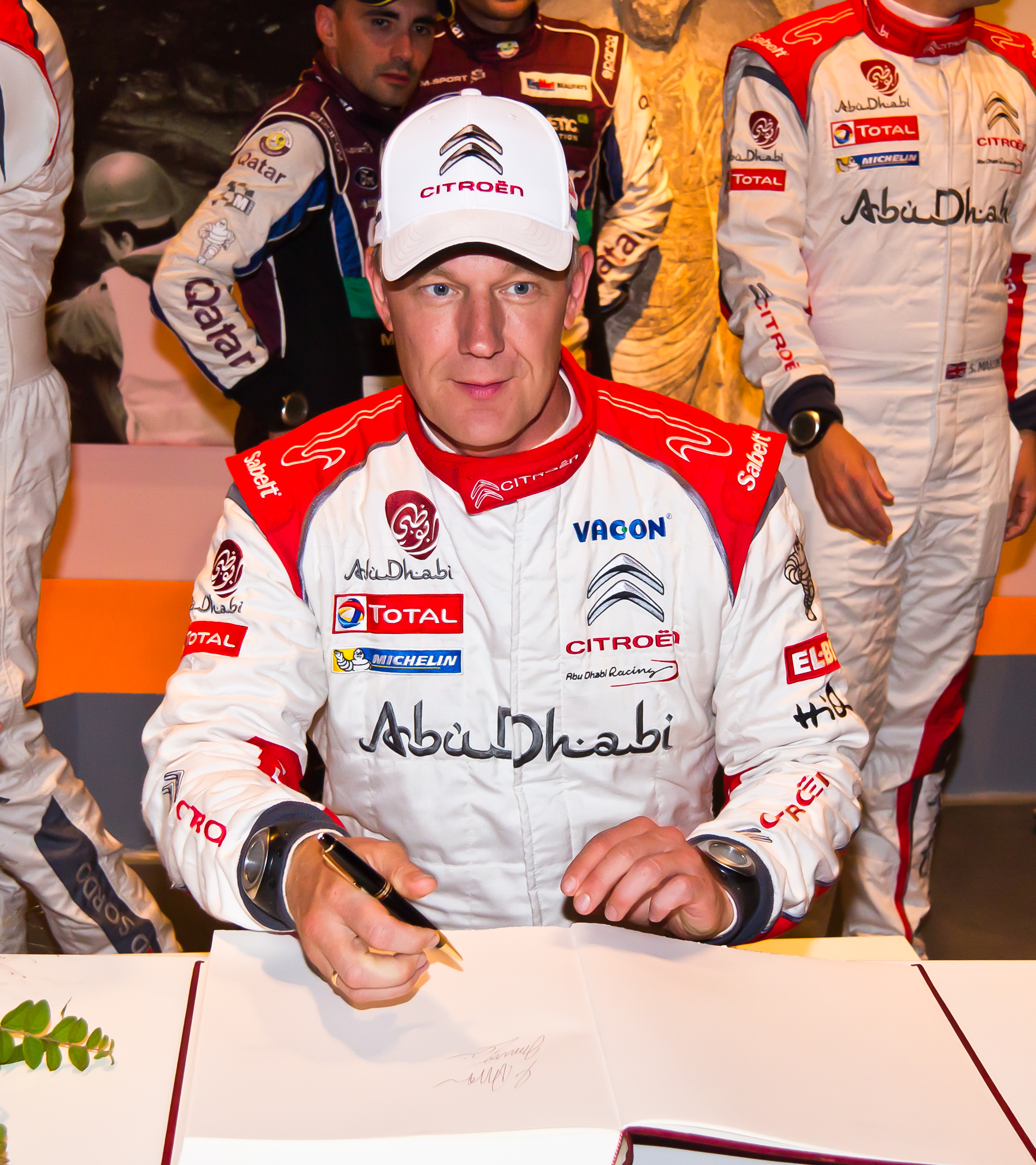
- Jarmo Lehtinen in 2013

Personal information
- Nationality: (Finland) Finnish
- Full name: Jarmo Johannes Lehtinen
- Born: 3 January 1969 (age 57)

World Rally Championship record
- Years active: 1997–2014, 2018–2020
- Driver: (Finland) Marko Rämänen (Finland) Jouni Ampuja (Finland) Mikko Hirvonen (Japan) Hiroki Arai (Finland) Teemu Suninen
- Teams: Citroën, Ford, Subaru, Škoda, M-Sport
- Rallies: 182
- Championships: 0
- Rally wins: 15
- Podiums: 71
- Stage wins: 264
- First rally: 1997 Rally Finland
- First win: 2006 Rally Australia
- Last win: 2012 Rally Italia Sardegna
- Last rally: 2020 Rally Monza

Jarmo Johannes Lehtinen (born 3 January 1969) is a rally co-driver from Finland. He was the co-driver to former World Rally Championship driver Mikko Hirvonen and have scored 15 WRC wins competing under Ford World Rally Team and Citroën Total. As of 2019, he is current co-driver for M-Sport driver Teemu Suninen.

== Career ==
Lehtinen started co-driving in 1988 alongside friend Jari Mikkola. He later partnered Marko Ramanen in the Finnish Rally Championship, and he made his WRC debut in the 1997 Rally Finland. In 1999, Lehtinen partnered Ramanen in the British Rally Championship and accompanied Jouni Ampuja to sixth in Group N in the Finnish Championship. He worked with Ampuja in the Finnish Championship for another two seasons. In 2002, he took up a new role in the gravel crew for Skoda driver Toni Gardemeister on the world championship. He also began to work with Hirvonen on international events. The pair have worked together on all their WRC outings since 2003, with Subaru in 2004 and with Ford since 2006, becoming runners-up in 2008. He won his first world rally at the 2006 Rally Australia. Lehtinen and Hirvonen competed for Citroën in 2012.

== WRC victories ==
No.	Event	Season	Driver	Car
1	19th Telstra Rally Australia	2006	Mikko Hirvonen	Ford Focus RS WRC 06
2	2nd Rally Norway	2007	Mikko Hirvonen	Ford Focus RS WRC 06
3	4th Rally Japan	2007	Mikko Hirvonen	Ford Focus RS WRC 07
4	(United Kingdom) 63rd Wales Rally of Great Britain	2007	Mikko Hirvonen	Ford Focus RS WRC 07
5	26th Jordan Rally	2008	Mikko Hirvonen	Ford Focus RS WRC 07
6	9th Rally of Turkey	2008	Mikko Hirvonen	Ford Focus RS WRC 07
7	5th Rally Japan	2008	Mikko Hirvonen	Ford Focus RS WRC 08
8	56th Acropolis Rally of Greece	2009	Mikko Hirvonen	Ford Focus RS WRC 09
9	66th Rally of Poland	2009	Mikko Hirvonen	Ford Focus RS WRC 09
10	59th Neste Oil Rally Finland	2009	Mikko Hirvonen	Ford Focus RS WRC 09
11	20th Repco Rally Australia	2009	Mikko Hirvonen	Ford Focus RS WRC 09
12	58th Rally Sweden	2010	Mikko Hirvonen	Ford Focus RS WRC 09
13	59th Rally Sweden	2011	Mikko Hirvonen	Ford Fiesta RS WRC
14	21st Rally Australia	2011	Mikko Hirvonen	Ford Fiesta RS WRC
15	(Italy) 9º Rally d'Italia Sardegna	2012	Mikko Hirvonen	Citroën DS3 WRC

== Complete WRC results ==
Year	Entrant	Car	1	2	3	4	5	6	7	8	9	10	11	12	13	14	15	16	Pos	Points
1997	Marko Rämänen	Honda Civic SiR	MON	SWE	KEN	POR	ESP	FRA	ARG	GRC	NZL	FIN; 38	IDN	ITA	AUS	GBR			-	-
1998	Marko Rämänen	Honda Civic SiR	MON	SWE	KEN	POR	ESP	FRA	ARG	GRC	NZL	FIN; Ret	ITA	AUS	GBR; Ret				-	-
1999	Marko Rämänen	Citroën Saxo Kit Car	MON	SWE	KEN	POR	ESP	FRA	ARG	GRC	NZL	FIN; Ret	CHN	ITA	AUS	GBR			-	-
2000	Jouni Ampuja	Mitsubishi Carisma GT Evolution VI	MON	SWE	KEN	POR	ESP	ARG	GRC	NZL	FIN; Ret	CYP	FRA	ITA	AUS	GBR			-	-
2001	Jouni Ampuja	Mitsubishi Carisma GT Evolution VI	MON	SWE	POR	ESP	ARG	CYP	GRE	KEN	FIN; Ret	NZL	ITA	FRA	AUS	GBR			-	-
2002	Mikko Hirvonen	Subaru Impreza WRC 00	MON	SWE	FRA	ESP	CYP	ARG	GRE	KEN	FIN	GER	ITA	NZL	AUS	GBR; Ret			-	-
2003	Ford Motor Co	Ford Focus RS WRC 02	MON; Ret	SWE; 11	TUR; Ret	NZL; 10	ARG; 16	GRE; Ret	CYP; 6	GER; 13	FIN; Ret	AUS; 9	ITA; Ret	FRA; 10	ESP; 14	GBR; Ret			17th	3
2004	Subaru	Subaru Impreza WRC 03	MON; Ret	SWE; 9															7th	29
2004	Subaru	Subaru Impreza WRC 04			MEX; 5	NZL; 7	CYP; 5	GRC; Ret	TUR; 6	ARG; 4	FIN; Ret	GER; 8	JPN; 7	GBR; 7	ITA; Ret	FRA; 10	ESP; 8	AUS; 4	7th	29
2005	Mikko Hirvonen	Ford Focus RS WRC 03	MON	SWE; Ret	MEX	NZL	ITA; Ret	CYP	TUR	GRC; 5	ARG		GER	GBR		FRA	ESP; 3	AUS	10th	14
2005	Ford	Ford Focus RS WRC 04										FIN; 5							10th	14
2005	Škoda	Škoda Fabia WRC													JPN; Ret				10th	14
2006	Ford	Ford Focus RS WRC 06	MON; 7	SWE; 12	MEX; 14	ESP; 9	FRA; 4	ARG; Ret	ITA; 2	GRC; 3	GER; 9	FIN; 3	JPN; 3	CYP; 3	TUR; 2	AUS; 1	NZL; 2	GBR; Ret	3rd	65
2007	Ford	Ford Focus RS WRC 06	MON; 5	SWE; 3	NOR; 1	MEX; 3	POR; 5	ARG; 3	ITA; 2	GRC; 4									3rd	99
2007	Ford	Ford Focus RS WRC 07									FIN; 2	GER; 3	NZL; 3	ESP; 4	FRA; 13	JPN; 1	IRE; 4	GBR; 1	3rd	99
2008	BP Ford Abu Dhabi	Ford Focus RS WRC 07	MON; 2	SWE; 2	MEX; 4	ARG; 5	JOR; 1	ITA; 2	GRC; 3	TUR; 1	FIN; 2								2nd	103
2008	BP Ford Abu Dhabi	Ford Focus RS WRC 08										GER; 4	NZL; 3	ESP; 3	FRA; 2	JPN; 1	GBR; 8		2nd	103
2009	BP Ford Abu Dhabi	Ford Focus RS WRC 08	IRE; 3	NOR; 2	CYP; 2	POR; 2	ARG; Ret												2nd	92
2009	BP Ford Abu Dhabi	Ford Focus RS WRC 09						ITA; 2	GRE; 1	POL; 1	FIN; 1	AUS; 1	ESP; 3	GBR; 2					2nd	92
2010	BP Ford Abu Dhabi	Ford Focus RS WRC 09	SWE; 1	MEX; 4	JOR; 20	TUR; 3	NZL; 4	POR; 4	BUL; 5	FIN; Ret	GER; Ret	JPN; 6	FRA; 5	ESP; 5	GBR; 4				6th	126
2011	Ford Abu Dhabi	Ford Fiesta RS WRC	SWE; 1	MEX; 2	POR; 4	JOR; 4	ITA; 2	ARG; 2	GRE; 3	FIN; 4	GER; 4	AUS; 1	FRA; 3	ESP; 2	GBR; Ret				2nd	214
2012	Citroën Total	Citroën DS3 WRC	MON; 4	SWE; 2	MEX; 2	POR; DSQ	ARG; 2	GRE; 2	NZL; 2	FIN; 2	GER; 3	GBR; 5	FRA; 3	ITA; 1	ESP; 3				2nd	213
2013	Citroën Total Abu Dhabi	Citroën DS3 WRC	MON; 4	SWE; 17	MEX; 2	POR; 2	ARG; 6	GRE; 8	ITA; Ret	FIN; 4	GER; 3	AUS; 3	FRA; 6	ESP; 3	GBR; Ret				4th	126
2014	M-Sport	Ford Fiesta RS WRC	MON; Ret	SWE; 4	MEX; 8	POR; 2	ARG; 9	ITA; Ret	POL; 4	FIN; 5	GER; 5	AUS; 5	FRA; 5	ESP; 3	GBR; 2				4th	126
2018	Tommi Mäkinen Racing	Ford Fiesta R5	MON	SWE	MEX	FRA	ARG	POR	ITA; Ret	FIN; 23	GER	TUR	GBR	ESP	AUS				NC	0
2019	M-Sport Ford WRT	Ford Fiesta WRC	MON	SWE	MEX	FRA	ARG	CHL	POR	ITA; 2	FIN; 8	GER; 29	TUR; 4	GBR; Ret	ESP; 7	AUS; C			11th	45
2020	M-Sport Ford WRT	Ford Fiesta WRC	MON; 8	SWE; 8	MEX; 3	EST; 6	TUR; Ret	ITA; 5	MNZ; Ret										7th	44
