= 2010 Wales Rally GB =

Rally car race

2010 Wales Rally GB 66th Wales Rally of Great Britain
Round 13 of the 2010 World Rally Championship season
← Previous event
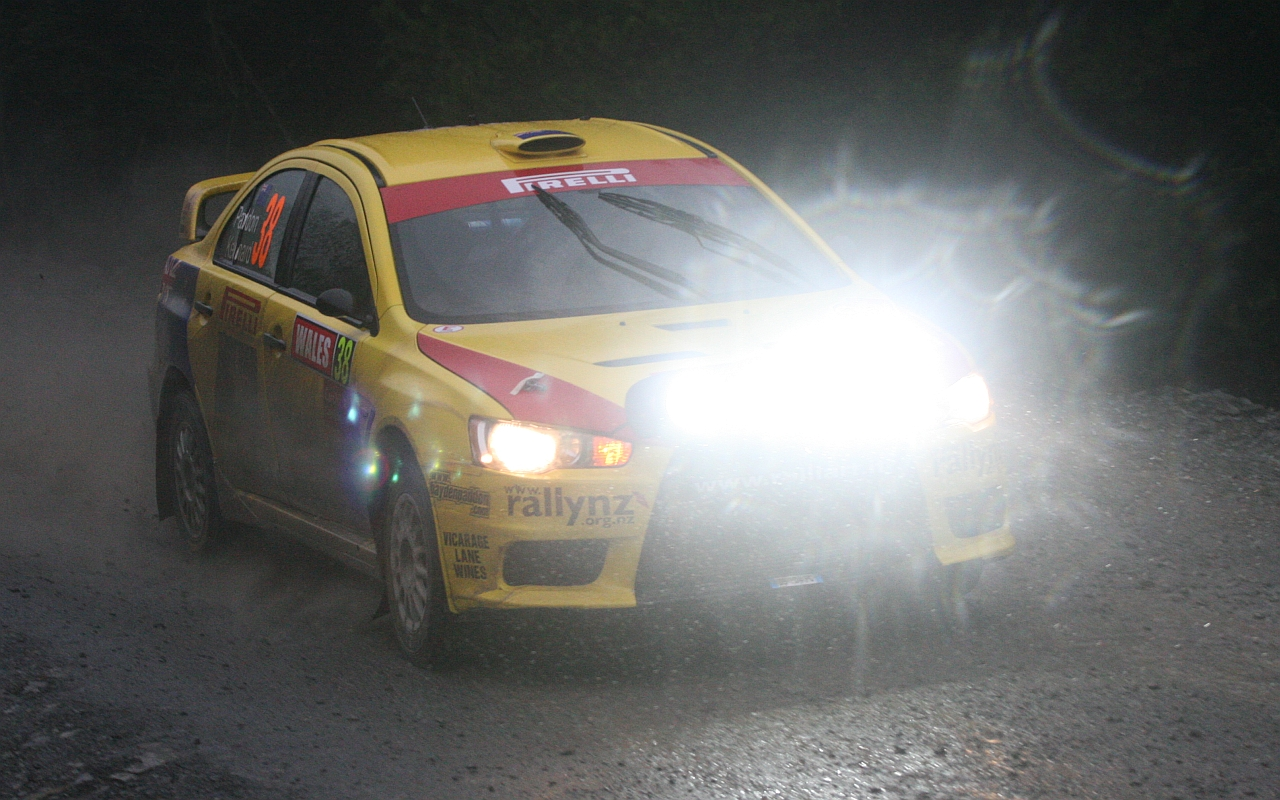
- Host country: United Kingdom
- Rally base: Cardiff
- Dates run: 11 – 14 November 2010
- Stages: 20 (348.32 km; 216.44 miles)
- Stage surface: Gravel
- Overall distance: 1,505.70 km (935.60 miles)

Statistics
- Crews: 61 at start, 45 at finish

Overall results
- Overall winner: (France) Sébastien Loeb (France) Citroën World Rally Team

The 2010 Wales Rally GB, was the thirteenth and final round of the 2010 World Rally Championship (WRC) season. The twenty stage gravel rally took place over 11–14 November 2010 and was based in the Welsh capital of Cardiff. The rally was the final event for two-litre World Rally Cars as the 2011 season will see the introduction of 1.6-litre World Rally Cars.

Sébastien Loeb won his eighth event of the season and the 62nd WRC rally of his career after holding off Petter Solberg by under 20 seconds. Jari-Matti Latvala finished third to secure second place in the drivers' championship.

Armindo Araújo finished second – behind Ott Tänak – in the PWRC class to claim his second successive championship, while Xavier Pons claimed the inaugural SWRC championship taking third on the rally behind Andreas Mikkelsen and Craig Breen.

== Introduction ==
The rally started with a super special stage being held at the Cardiff Bay Barrage on the Thursday evening. Friday and Saturday saw the rally complete fourteen stages in Mid Wales, with servicing at Builth Wells, before another super special stage at Cardiff Bay. Sunday had a further four stages in the South Wales area.

== Results ==
=== Event standings ===
Pos.	Driver	Co-driver	Car	Time	Difference	Points
Overall
1.	(France) Sébastien Loeb	(Monaco) Daniel Elena	Citroën C4 WRC	3:14:54.0	0.0	25
2.	(Norway) Petter Solberg	(United Kingdom) Chris Patterson	Citroën C4 WRC	3:15:13.1	19.1	18
3.	(Finland) Jari-Matti Latvala	(Finland) Miikka Anttila	Ford Focus RS WRC 09	3:16:29.3	1:35.3	15
4.	(Finland) Mikko Hirvonen	(Finland) Jarmo Lehtinen	Ford Focus RS WRC 09	3:16:47.3	1:53.3	12
5.	(Spain) Dani Sordo	(Spain) Diego Vallejo	Citroën C4 WRC	3:17:06.2	2:12.2	10
6.	(Norway) Henning Solberg	(Austria) Ilka Minor	Ford Focus RS WRC 08	3:21:20.5	6:26.5	8
7.	(United Kingdom) Matthew Wilson	(United Kingdom) Scott Martin	Ford Focus RS WRC 08	3:23:31.8	8:37.8	6
8.	(Finland) Kimi Räikkönen	(Finland) Kaj Lindström	Citroën C4 WRC	3:25:21.9	10:27.9	4
9.	(Norway) Mads Østberg	(Sweden) Jonas Andersson	Subaru Impreza WRC 2007	3:27:07.7	12:13.7	2
10.	(Norway) Andreas Mikkelsen	(Norway) Ola Fløene	Škoda Fabia S2000	3:28:55.2	14:01.2	1
SWRC
1. (10.)	(Norway) Andreas Mikkelsen	(Norway) Ola Fløene	Škoda Fabia S2000	3:28:55.2	0.0	25
2. (12.)	(Republic of Ireland) Craig Breen	(United Kingdom) Gareth Roberts	Ford Fiesta S2000	3:34:57.9	6:02.7	18
3. (13.)	(Spain) Xavier Pons	(Spain) Alex Haro	Ford Fiesta S2000	3:35:10.7	6:15.5	15
4. (14.)	(Sweden) Patrik Sandell	(Sweden) Emil Axelsson	Škoda Fabia S2000	3:35:15.9	6:20.7	12
5. (15.)	(Poland) Michał Kościuszko	(Poland) Maciek Szczepaniak	Skoda Fabia S2000	3:37:14.1	8:18.9	10
PWRC
1. (17.)	(Estonia) Ott Tänak	(Estonia) Kuldar Sikk	Mitsubishi Lancer Evolution X	3:38:31.0	0.0	25
2. (18.)	(Portugal) Armindo Araújo	(Portugal) Miguel Ramalho	Mitsubishi Lancer Evolution X	3:41:46.8	3:15.8	18
3. (19.)	(New Zealand) Hayden Paddon	(New Zealand) John Kennard	Mitsubishi Lancer Evolution X	3:42:58.9	4:27.9	15
4. (20.)	(United Kingdom) Jason Pritchard	(United Kingdom) Robbie Durant	Subaru Impreza WRX STI	3:45:35.4	7:04.4	12
5. (22.)	(Sweden) Patrik Flodin	(Sweden) Göran Bergsten	Subaru Impreza WRX STI	3:46:51.9	8:20.9	10
6. (25.)	(United Kingdom) Dave Weston Jr.	(United Kingdom) Ieuan Thomas	Subaru Impreza WRX STI	3:53:18.4	14:47.4	8
7. (26.)	(Mexico) Michel Jourdain Jr.	(Spain) Óscar Sánchez	Mitsubishi Lancer Evolution X	3:54:29.1	15:58.1	6
8. (28.)	(San Marino) Alex Raschi	(Italy) Rudy Pollet	Mitsubishi Lancer Evolution X	3:55:51.4	17:20.4	4
9. (30.)	(Japan) Toshi Arai	(United Kingdom) Daniel Barritt	Subaru Impreza WRX STI	3:58:55.1	20:24.1	2
10. (32.)	(Finland) Reijo Muhonen	(Finland) Juha Kanerva	Mitsubishi Lancer Evolution X	4:05:08.5	26:37.5	1

=== Special stages ===
All dates and times are GMT (UTC±0).

Day	Stage	Time	Name	Length	Winner	Time	Avg. spd.	Rally leader
Leg 1 (11–12 Nov)	SS1	19:30	Cardiff Bay 1	1.70 km	(France) Sébastien Loeb	1:16.1	80.42 km/h	(France) Sébastien Loeb
Leg 1 (11–12 Nov)	SS2	9:38	Hafren 1	32.14 km	(Finland) Jari-Matti Latvala	18:43.2	103.01 km/h	(Finland) Jari-Matti Latvala
Leg 1 (11–12 Nov)	SS3	10:19	Sweet Lamb 1	4.26 km	(France) Sébastien Loeb	2:54.4	87.94 km/h	(France) Sébastien Loeb
Leg 1 (11–12 Nov)	SS4	10:37	Myherin 1	27.88 km	(Finland) Jari-Matti Latvala	15:33.3	107.54 km/h	(Finland) Jari-Matti Latvala
Leg 1 (11–12 Nov)	SS5	13:51	Hafren 2	32.14 km	(France) Sébastien Ogier	18:39.0	103.40 km/h	(Finland) Jari-Matti Latvala
Leg 1 (11–12 Nov)	SS6	14:32	Sweet Lamb 2	4.26 km	(France) Sébastien Loeb	2:57.1	86.60 km/h	(Finland) Jari-Matti Latvala
Leg 1 (11–12 Nov)	SS7	14:50	Myherin 2	27.88 km	(France) Sébastien Loeb	15:16.5	109.51 km/h	(France) Sébastien Loeb
Leg 2 (13 Nov)	SS8	9:03	Radnor 1	14.78 km	(Norway) Petter Solberg (Finland) Jari-Matti Latvala	7:31.5	117.85 km/h	(Norway) Petter Solberg
Leg 2 (13 Nov)	SS9	10:19	Monument Hill 1	10.14 km	(Norway) Petter Solberg	5:46.5	105.35 km/h	(Norway) Petter Solberg
Leg 2 (13 Nov)	SS10	10:43	Four Ways Crychan 1	25.14 km	(France) Sébastien Loeb	13:48.7	109.21 km/h	(France) Sébastien Loeb
Leg 2 (13 Nov)	SS11	11:22	Halfway 1	18.37 km	(Norway) Petter Solberg	10:28.2	105.27 km/h	(France) Sébastien Loeb
Leg 2 (13 Nov)	SS12	14:07	Radnor 2	14.78 km	(France) Sébastien Loeb	7:22.3	120.30 km/h	(France) Sébastien Loeb
Leg 2 (13 Nov)	SS13	15:23	Monument Hill 2	10.14 km	(France) Sébastien Loeb	5:46.0	105.50 km/h	(France) Sébastien Loeb
Leg 2 (13 Nov)	SS14	15:47	Four Ways Crychan 2	25.14 km	(France) Sébastien Loeb	14:04.9	107.12 km/h	(France) Sébastien Loeb
Leg 2 (13 Nov)	SS15	16:26	Halfway 2	18.37 km	(Norway) Petter Solberg	10:35.9	104.00 km/h	(France) Sébastien Loeb
Leg 2 (13 Nov)	SS16	18:34	Cardiff Bay 2	1.70 km	(France) Sébastien Loeb	1:15.5	81.06 km/h	(France) Sébastien Loeb
Leg 3 (14 Nov)	SS17	8:33	Resolfen 1	29.99 km	(France) Sébastien Loeb	15:57.8	112.72 km/h	(France) Sébastien Loeb
Leg 3 (14 Nov)	SS18	9:46	Margam Park 1	8.08 km	(France) Sébastien Loeb	5:06.2	95.00 km/h	(France) Sébastien Loeb
Leg 3 (14 Nov)	SS19	11:25	Resolfen 2	29.99 km	(Finland) Jari-Matti Latvala	16:03.8	112.02 km/h	(France) Sébastien Loeb
Leg 3 (14 Nov)	SS20	12:38	Margam Park 2	8.08 km	(Spain) Dani Sordo	5:08.2	94.38 km/h	(France) Sébastien Loeb

=== Standings after the rally ===
Drivers' Championship standings

Pos.	Driver	Points
1	(France) Sébastien Loeb	276
2	(Finland) Jari-Matti Latvala	171
3	(Norway) Petter Solberg	169
4	(France) Sebastien Ogier	167
5	(Spain) Dani Sordo	150
6	(Finland) Mikko Hirvonen	126
7	(United Kingdom) Matthew Wilson	74
8	(Norway) Henning Solberg	45
9	(Argentina) Federico Villagra	36
10	(Finland) Kimi Räikkönen	25

Manufacturers' Championship standings

Pos.	Manufacturer	Points
1	(France) Citroen WRT	456
2	(United Kingdom) BP Ford WRT	337
3	(France) Citroen Junior Team	217
4	(United Kingdom) Stobart Ford	176
5	(Argentina) Munchi's Ford	58
