= Toshi Arai =

Japanese rally driver (born 1966)

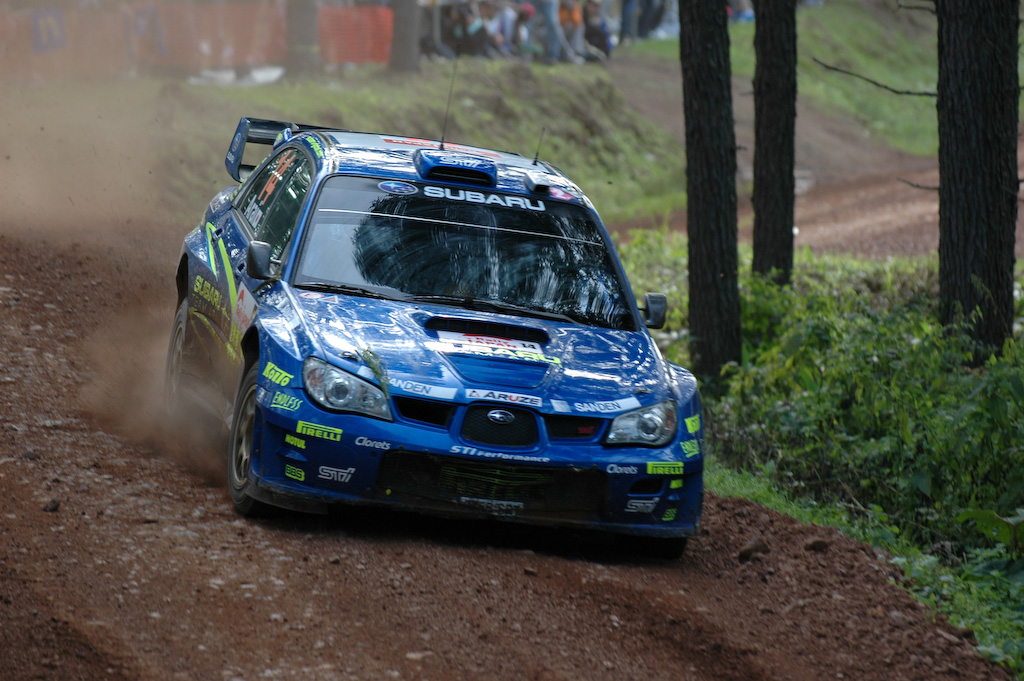
- Born: Toshihiro Arai; 25 December 1966 (age 59)
- Relatives: Hiroki Arai (son)
Toshi Arai
World Rally Championship record
- Years active: 1997–2010, 2022
- Co-driver: (Japan) Toshio Omizo (Japan) Hiroshi Suzuki (United Kingdom) Roger Freeman (Australia) Glenn MacNeall (New Zealand) Tony Sircombe (United Kingdom) Daniel Barritt (Japan) Naoya Tanaka
- Teams: Privateer, Subaru
- Rallies: 87
- Championships: 0
- Rally wins: 0
- Podiums: 0
- Stage wins: 0
- Total points: 11
- First rally: 1997 Rally Australia
- Last rally: 2022 Rally Japan

Toshihiro Arai (新井敏弘, Arai Toshihiro; born December 25, 1966) is a Japanese rally driver and team owner. He is the first Japanese FIA world champion.

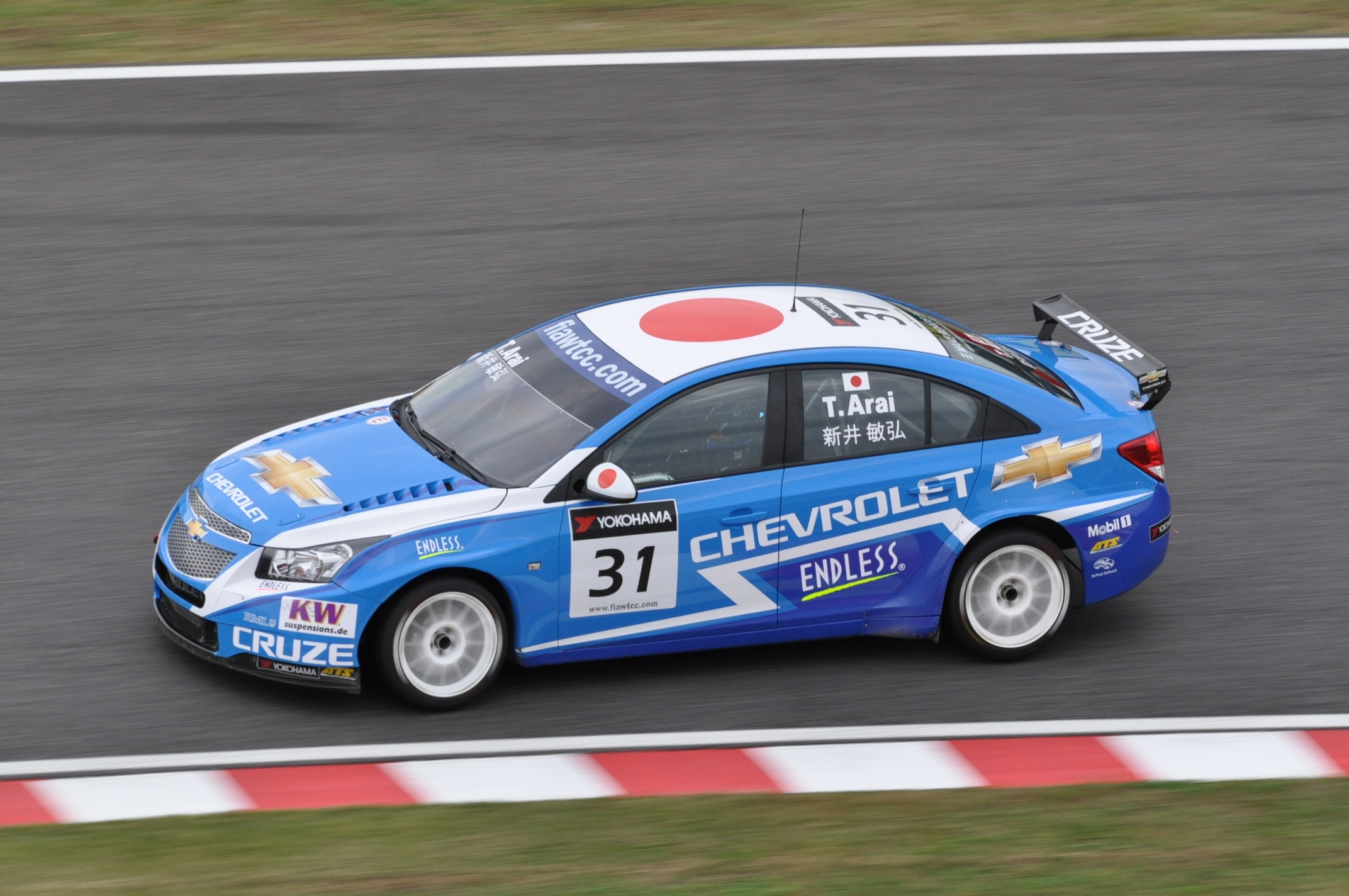
Arai driving for Chevrolet at Suzuka during the 2011 World Touring Car Championship season.

Arai was born in Isesaki, Gunma. He made his debut in 1987 and drove for the Subaru World Rally Team in the Group N World Rally Championship from 1997 to 2000 and 2002–2003, and in the Group A Championship in 2000–2001.

In 2004, Arai established his own team, Subaru Team Arai, and won the FIA Production Car World Rally Championship for Drivers in 2005 and 2007 driving a Subaru Impreza WRX STI, which made him the first Japanese FIA world champion. He scored class victories in Turkey, Japan and Australia on his way to the title.

Arai was also the winner of the short-lived FIA Teams' Cup in 2000.

== Career results ==
=== WRC results ===
Year	Entrant	Car	1	2	3	4	5	6	7	8	9	10	11	12	13	14	15	16	WDC	Pts
1997	Subaru Rally Team Japan	Subaru Impreza 555	MON	SWE	KEN	POR	ESP	FRA	ARG	GRE	NZL	FIN	IDN	ITA	AUS; 16	GBR			NC	0
1998	Subaru Rally Team Japan	Subaru Impreza WRX	MON	SWE	KEN	POR	ESP	FRA	ARG	GRE	NZL; EX	FIN	ITA						NC	0
1998	Toshihiro Arai	Subaru Impreza WRX												AUS; Ret	GBR; Ret				NC	0
1999	Subaru Allstars Endless Sport	Subaru Impreza WRC 98	MON	SWE	KEN	POR; Ret	ESP; 21	FRA; 16	ARG	GRE; 9									NC	0
1999	Subaru Rally Team Japan	Subaru Impreza WRX									NZL; 13	FIN							NC	0
1999	STi Club Rally Team	Subaru Impreza WRX											CHN; 7	ITA					NC	0
1999	Subaru Rally Team Japan	Subaru Impreza 555													AUS; 8	GBR			NC	0
2000	Spike Subaru Team	Subaru Impreza WRC 99	MON	SWE	KEN; 6	POR	ESP; 16	ARG	GRE; 4	NZL; Ret	FIN	CYP; 9	FRA	ITA		GBR; Ret			13th	4
2000	Spike Subaru Team	Subaru Impreza 555													AUS; 13				13th	4
2001	Subaru World Rally Team	Subaru Impreza WRC 01	MON	SWE	POR; Ret	ESP	ARG; 8	CYP; 4	GRE; Ret	KEN; Ret	FIN	NZL; 14	ITA; Ret	FRA; Ret	AUS; Ret	GBR; 10			18th	3
2002	Toshihiro Arai	Subaru Impreza 555	MON	SWE; 25	FRA	ESP													NC	0
2002	Spike Subaru Team	Subaru Impreza WRX					CYP; Ret	ARG; 11		KEN; Ret	FIN			NZL; Ret	AUS; 14	GBR			NC	0
2002	555 Subaru World Rally Team	Subaru Impreza WRC 02							GRE; 13			GER; Ret	ITA						NC	0
2003	Subaru Production Rally Team	Subaru Impreza WRX	MON	SWE; Ret	TUR	NZL; 11	ARG; 9	GRE	CYP; 9	GER	FIN	AUS; Ret	ITA	FRA; 17	ESP	GBR			NC	0
2004	Subaru Team Arai	Subaru Impreza WRX STi	MON	SWE; 26	MEX; 13	NZL; 15	CYP	GRE	TUR	ARG; Ret	FIN	GER; 18	JPN; 9	GBR	ITA	FRA	ESP	AUS; 8	30th	1
2005	Subaru Team Arai	Subaru Impreza WRX STi	MON	SWE; 17	MEX	NZL; 14	ITA	CYP; 21	TUR; 14	GRE	ARG	FIN	GER	GBR	JPN; 12	FRA	ESP	AUS; 9	NC	0
2006	Subaru Team Arai	Subaru Impreza WRX STi	MON	SWE	MEX; 9	ESP	FRA	ARG; 30	ITA	GRE; 21	GER	FIN		CYP; 22	TUR	AUS; Ret	NZL; 30	GBR	25th	3
2006	Subaru World Rally Team	Subaru Impreza WRC 06											JPN; 6						25th	3
2007	Subaru Team Arai	Subaru Impreza WRX STi	MON	SWE; 23	NOR	MEX; 11	POR	ARG; 10	ITA	GRE; 15	FIN	GER	NZL; 13	ESP	FRA	JPN; 29	IRE	GBR	NC	0
2008	Subaru Team Arai	Subaru Impreza STi N14	MON	SWE; 15	MEX	ARG; Ret	JOR	ITA	GRE; Ret	TUR; Ret	FIN	GER	NZL; Ret	ESP	FRA	JPN; 12	GBR		NC	0
2009	Subaru Team Arai	Subaru Impreza STi N14	IRL	NOR; Ret	CYP; 13	POR	ARG; 12	ITA	GRE; 10	POL	FIN	AUS; Ret	ESP	GBR; 13					NC	0
2010	Subaru Team Arai	Subaru Impreza STi N15	SWE	MEX; 11	JOR	TUR	NZL; 26	POR	BUL	FIN	GER; 34	JPN; Ret	FRA; 23	ESP	GBR; 30				NC	0
2022	Toshi Arai	Citroën C3 Rally2	MON	SWE	CRO	POR	ITA	KEN	EST	FIN	BEL	GRE	NZL	ESP	JPN; Ret				NC	0

=== PWRC results ===
Year	Entrant	Car	1	2	3	4	5	6	7	8	9	Pos.	Points
2002	Toshihiro Arai	Subaru Impreza 555	SWE; 2	FRA								4th	22
2002	Spike Subaru Team	Subaru Impreza WRX			CYP; Ret	ARG; 2	KEN; Ret	FIN	NZL; Ret	AUS; 1		4th	22
2003	Subaru Production Rally Team	Subaru Impreza WRX	SWE; Ret	NZL; 1	ARG; 1	CYP; 1	GER	AUS; Ret	FRA; 2			**2nd**	**38**
2004	Subaru Team Arai	Subaru Impreza WRX STi	SWE; 6	MEX; 2	NZL; 5	ARG; Ret	GER; 4	FRA	AUS; 2			**2nd**	**30**
2005	Subaru Team Arai	Subaru Impreza WRX STi	SWE; 1	NZL; 2	CYP; 7	TUR; 1	ARG	GBR	JPN; 1	AUS; 1		**1st**	**50**
2006	Subaru Team Arai	Subaru Impreza WRX STi	MON	MEX; 1	ARG; 8	GRE; 5	JPN	CYP; 6	AUS; Ret	NZL; 9		6th	18
2007	Subaru Team Arai	Subaru Impreza WRX STi	SWE; 6	MEX; 2	ARG; 2	GRE; 1	NZL; 1	JPN; 10	IRE	GBR		**1st**	**39**
2008	Subaru Team Arai	Subaru Impreza STi N14	SWE; 6	ARG; Ret	GRE; Ret	TUR; Ret	FIN	NZL; Ret	JPN; 3	GBR		12th	9
2009	Subaru Team Arai	Subaru Impreza STi N14	NOR; Ret	CYP; 4	POR	ARG; 3	ITA	GRE; 3	AUS; Ret	GBR; 2		5th	25
2010	Subaru Team Arai	Subaru Impreza STi N15	SWE	MEX; 2	JOR	NZL; 4	FIN	GER; 6	JPN; Ret	FRA; 3	GBR; 9	5th	55

=== IRC results ===
Year	Entrant	Car	1	2	3	4	5	6	7	8	9	10	11	12	13	Pos.	Points
2010	Subaru Team Arai	Subaru Impreza STi N15	MON	BRA	ARG	CAN	ITA	YPR; Ret	AZO	MAD	ZLI	ITA	SCO	CYP		NC	0
2011	Stohl Racing	Subaru Impreza STi R4	MON	CAN	COR; 13	UKR	YPR	AZO; Ret	ZLI	MEC; 18	SAN	SCO; 9	CYP; 7			17th	15
2012	Subaru Team Arai	Subaru Impreza STi R4	AZO	CAN	IRL	COR; 14	ITA	YPR	SMR; Ret	ROM	ZLI; 11	YAL	SLI	SAN		10th	30
2012	Subaru Team Arai	Subaru Impreza TMR R4													CYP; 3	10th	30

=== European Rally Championship results ===
Year	Entrant	Car	1	2	3	4	5	6	7	8	9	10	11	12	Pos.	Points
2013	Stohl Racing	Subaru Impreza STi R4	JÄN	LIE	CAN	AZO	COR	YPR	ROM; 3^{8}	ZLÍ; Ret	POL; 13	CRO	SAN; 19	VAL	21st	23

=== Complete World Touring Car Championship results ===
(key) (Races in bold indicate pole position) (Races in italics indicate fastest lap)

Year	Team	Car	1	2	3	4	5	6	7	8	9	10	11	12	13	14	15	16	17	18	19	20	21	22	23	24	DC	Points
2011	Chevrolet RML	Chevrolet Cruze 1.6T	BRA; 1	BRA; 2	BEL; 1	BEL; 2	ITA; 1	ITA; 2	HUN; 1	HUN; 2	CZE; 1	CZE; 2	POR; 1	POR; 2	GBR; 1	GBR; 2	GER; 1	GER; 2	ESP; 1	ESP; 2	JPN; 1; 13	JPN; 2; 15	CHN; 1	CHN; 2	MAC; 1	MAC; 2	NC	0

=== Complete Global Rallycross results ===
==== Supercar ====
Year	Entrant	Car	1	2	3	4	5	6	7	8	9	10	11	12	GRC	Points
2016	Subaru Rally Team USA	Subaru Impreza WRX STi	PHO1	PHO2	DAL	DAY1	DAY2	MCAS1	MCAS2^{†}	DC	AC	SEA	LA1; 13	LA2; 13	19th	4

^{†}Race cancelled.
