= Rune Dalsjø =

Norwegian rally driver

Rune Dalsjø (born March 8, 1975) is a Norwegian rally driver. He made his rally debut in 1996 and has since then enjoyed success in the Norwegian Championship. The cars he has rallied include Opel Ascona, Volvo 240, Mitsubishi Lancer Gr. N, Subaru Imprezas and Mitsubishi Lancer Evo 6 Gr. A.

In Rally Norway in 2007 he scored a surprise ninth overall in a rented Subaru Impreza S9.
