= Subaru World Rally Team =

British car rallying team, 1980–2008

Subaru
- Full name: Subaru World Rally Team
- Base: Banbury, England
- Team principal(s): David Richards
- Technical director: Richard Taylor
- Chassis: Subaru Legacy; Subaru Impreza
- Tyres: Pirelli

World Rally Championship history
- Debut: 1990 Safari Rally
- Last event: 2008 Wales Rally GB
- Manufacturers' Championships: 3 (1995, 1996, 1997)
- Drivers' Championships: 3 (1995, 2001, 2003)
- Rally wins: 47

The Subaru World Rally Team (SWRT) was Subaru's World Rally Championship (WRC) team. It used a distinctive blue with yellow colour scheme that is a throwback to the sponsorship deal with State Express 555, a BAT cigarette brand popular in Asia. 555 logos were found on Subaru cars from 1993 to 2003, although less prevalent since 1999 due to BAT's participation in Formula One with British American Racing. Subaru's WRC efforts date back to 1980, however, in 1989 British firm Prodrive took over its operations, and its base moved from Japan to Banbury, England.

Subaru used the team to showcase its symmetrical all wheel drive technology. It has credited the increased sales of its vehicles, especially the Subaru Impreza, with its success in the World Rally Championship, in addition to popularizing its all-wheel-drive system.

Its 2008 season drivers were Petter Solberg with co-driver Phil Mills, and Chris Atkinson with co-driver Stéphane Prévot. David Richards was the team's Principal, and a founder and chairman of Prodrive. Paul Howarth was the team's operations director and team manager. He replaced David Lapworth in 2006. Richard Taylor was the team's managing director.

The team was a strong one, competing at the top of the WRC for over a decade. It won the manufacturers' championship three times in 1995, 1996, and 1997, and the drivers' championship three times, in 1995, 2001, and 2003. Its Impreza model won a record 46 rallies. The team withdrew from WRC competition at the end of the 2008 season due to the 2008 financial crisis.

== Racing history ==
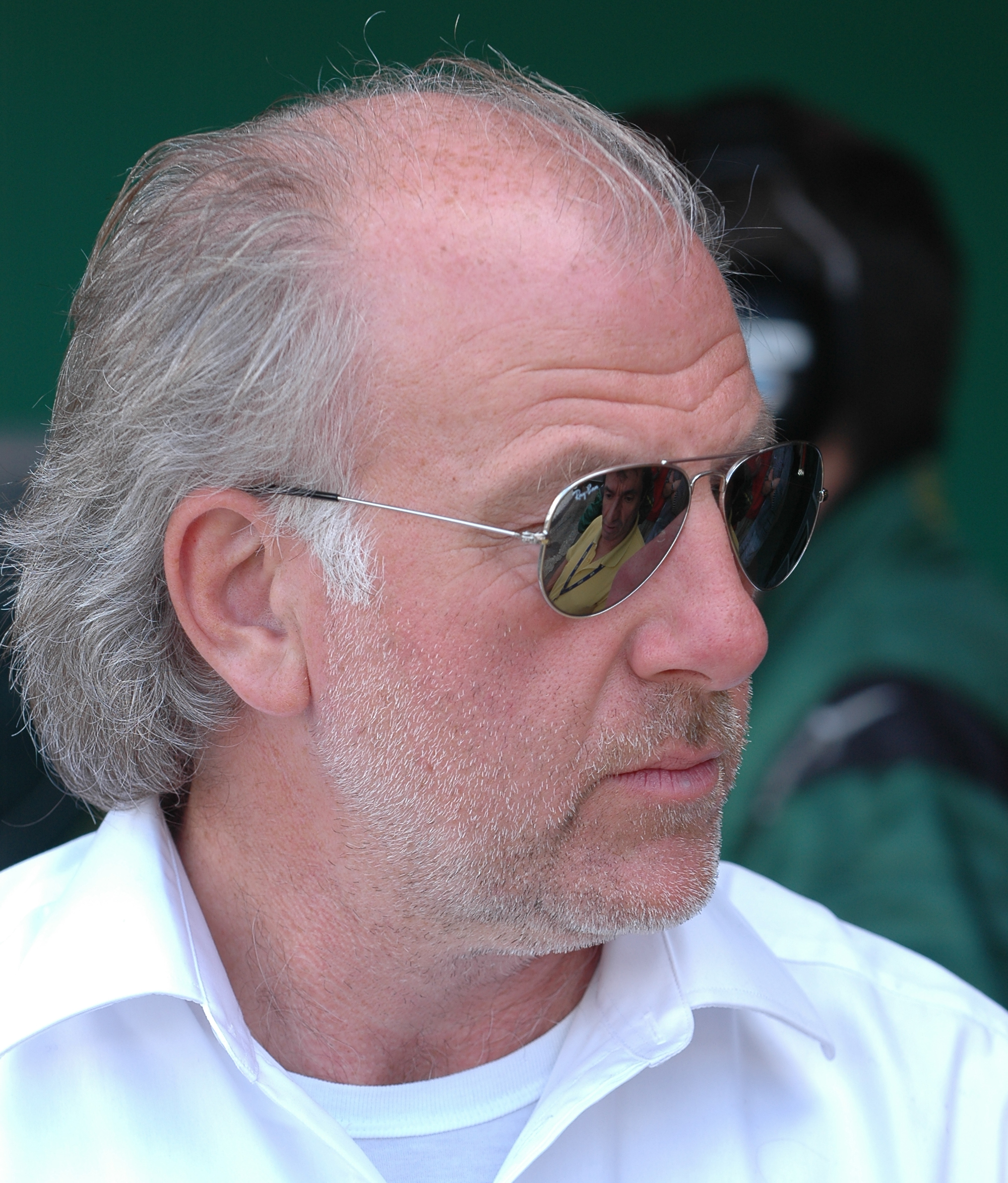
Team Principal David Richards

Although Subaru had participated in the World Rally Championship at various times since 1980, it was not until September 1989, that the Subaru World Rally Team, in its current form, was created. Subaru Tecnica International (STi) president Ryuichiro Kuze forged a partnership with the British firm Prodrive to prepare and enter the recently introduced Legacy RS in the World Rally Championship.

=== 1970–1979 ===
Subaru's initial forays into the World Rally Championship were with the Fuji Heavy Industries entries, these were pretty much confined to endurance events like the Safari (or non World event, the Australian Southern Cross rally) and were with the small front wheel drive FF-1 (1000cc) and then the Subaru GSR coupe (homologation special) as first a 1300cc and then a 1400cc car. These were with the 4 cylinder Boxer engine of the same EA family that later grew to 1800cc and also with a turbo version.

=== 1980–1989 ===
Subaru's next forays into the World Rally Championship were with Subaru Rally Team Japan, run by Noriyuki Koseki, the founder of Subaru Tecnica International. The first Subaru car entered a world rally at the 1980 Safari Rally and since that, the team only participated in a few events per season, driving the Subaru Leone. A Subaru SRX was entered in the Cyprus rally in 1980. Drivers in the early years included Ari Vatanen, Per Eklund, Shekhar Mehta, Mike Kirkland, Possum Bourne, and Harald Demuth. The best result and only podium was achieved by Bourne at the 1987 Rally New Zealand by finishing third. With the start of the Prodrive effort, the teams competed in parallel, before being folded into each other.

=== 1990–1992 ===
Subaru entered its first Prodrive developed car, the Group A Subaru Legacy RS in the 1990 season, piloted by Finnish driver Markku Alén. Alen remained with the team through the 1991 season. His successes included 4th place in the 1990 Rally Finland, also known as the 1000 Lakes Rally, and in 1991, a 3rd and two 4th places. For the 1992 season, Subaru only entered seven of the fourteen WRC events, preferring to demonstrate the car's ability on gravel rallies. The drivers for 1992 were Finn Ari Vatanen with co-driver Bruno Berglund and Scotsman Colin McRae with co-driver Derek Ringer. Both drivers were able to achieve second-place finishes. Colin McRae also won the British Rally Championship in 1991 and 1992.

=== 1993 ===
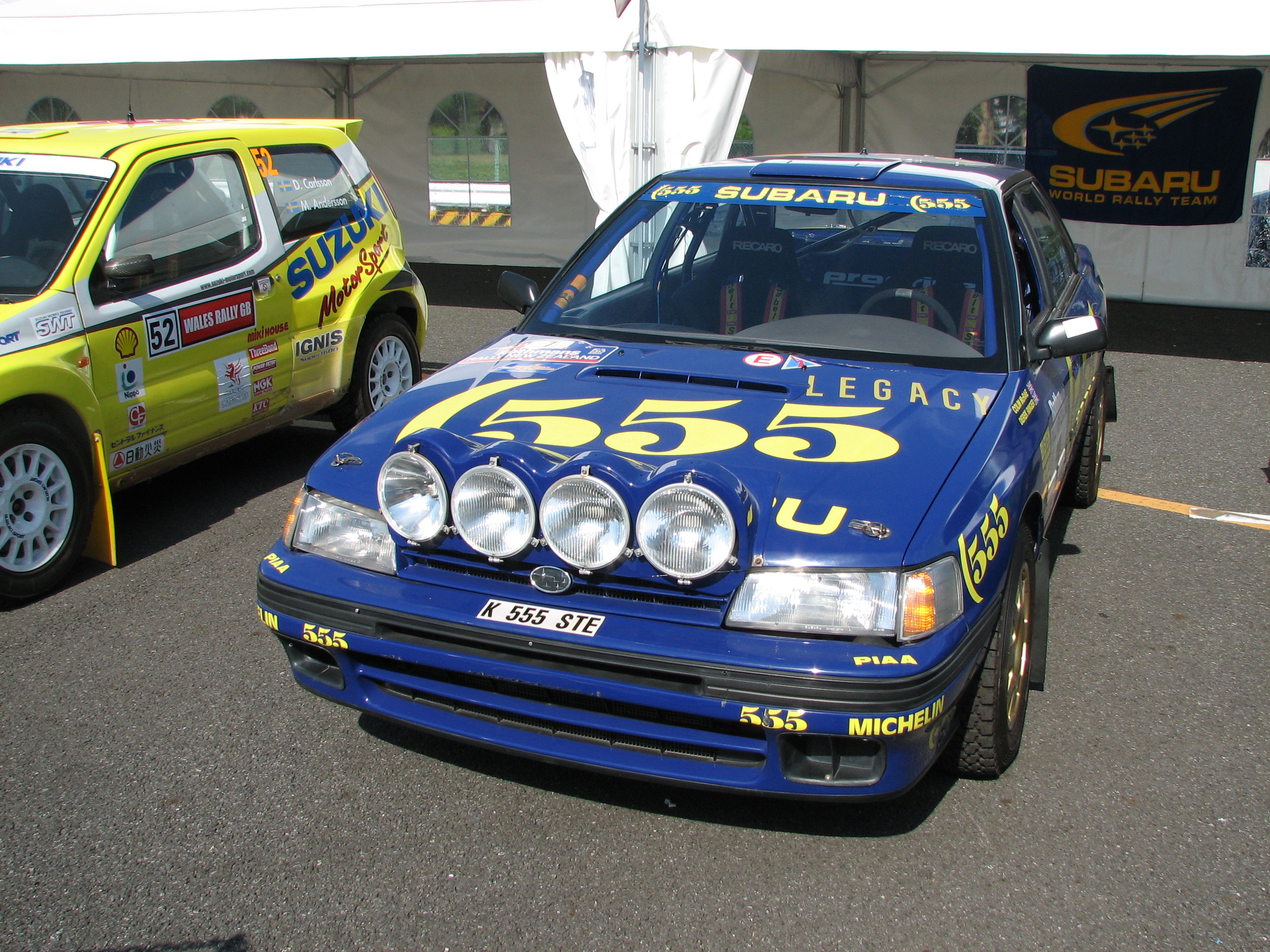
1993 Legacy RS in 555 livery

For the 1993 World Rally Championship season, the Subaru team debuted its now distinctive blue and yellow color scheme, along with a new title sponsor, State Express 555. Ari Vatanen and Colin McRae remained the primary drivers, with the season being McRae's first complete year of World Rally Championship competition. Markku Alén, returned part-time to the team after a brief stint at Toyota in 1992, and took 4th for Subaru in Portugal. McRae took the first win for Subaru, at the eighth event of the season, Rally New Zealand, the last outing for the Group A Subaru Legacy rally cars. At the next event, Rally Finland, Subaru debuted their new Prodrive developed Group A Impreza rally car, known as the Impreza 555, driven by Vatanen and Alén. Alén crashed on the first stage, and did not drive for Subaru again. Vatanen, however, showed the car to be quick, even leading the rally at one point, and managing a second-place finish. At the end of the season, Vatanen took seventh in the Drivers' Championship, and Colin McRae finished in fifth with 50. Subaru finished third in the Manufacturers' Championship. Other drivers also competed for the Subaru team at selected events. New Zealand driver Possum Bourne, veteran of Subaru's early days, joined the team for the Rally New Zealand and Rally Australia. Piero Liatti competed in Rallye Sanremo and Rally Great Britain. Drivers Richard Burns and Alister McRae had competed in the British Championship, which Burns won, and appeared again in Legacies for Rally Great Britain, where Burns finished seventh and McRae tenth. Drivers Per Eklund and Hannu Mikkola drove for the team in Rally Sweden.

=== 1994–1995 ===
In 1994, former World Rally Drivers' Champion Carlos Sainz joined the team with co-driver Luis Moya, and took the Impreza 555 to its first win at the Acropolis Rally in Greece. It later took wins in New Zealand and Great Britain with McRae at the wheel. In the Championship for Manufacturers, they achieved a second-place finish, behind Toyota, with Sainz placing second in the driver's championship, and McRae placing fourth. Other drivers for the Subaru team in 1994 included Patrick Njiru, competing in the Safari Rally, Richard Burns in the Safari Rally and Rally Great Britain, Possum Bourne in New Zealand, and Piero Liatti at Rallye Sanremo.

For the 1995 season, the primary drivers remained Sainz in the number 5 car and McRae in the number 4 car. Sainz won the season opening round at the Rallye Monte Carlo, while McRae crashed out of the event. At Rally Sweden, Sainz, McRae, and third driver Mats Jonsson all retired with engine trouble. Sainz won again at the Rally Portugal, while McRae finished in third place. At the Rallye de France, Sainz, McRae, and third driver Piero Liatti finished in the fourth, fifth, and sixth places respectively. At Rally New Zealand, McRae took his first win of the season. Other drivers for the team included Possum Bourne, who finished in seventh place, and Richard Burns who retired with a mechanical failure. At the Rally Australia, McRae took second place. Sainz retired after his radiator failed, while third driver Bourne retired after an accident. At the Rallye Catalunya, Subaru locked out the podium with a 1–2–3 finish. Sainz took first, McRae took second, and third driver Piero Liatti finished third. Sainz's first-place finish in Catalunya left he and McRae tied for points going into the last event of the season, the RAC Rally of Great Britain. McRae won out, taking first place at his home event, clinching his first and only Driver's Championship, a first for the Subaru team. Sainz finished close behind in second place, giving him second in the Championship, and third driver Richard Burns finished in third place, giving the team a second consecutive 1–2–3 finish. Between McRae and Sainz the team managed to win five of the season's eight rallies for Subaru, winning the team its first Constructors Championship. At the end of the season, Sainz left Subaru to join Ford World Rallye Sport.

=== 1996 ===
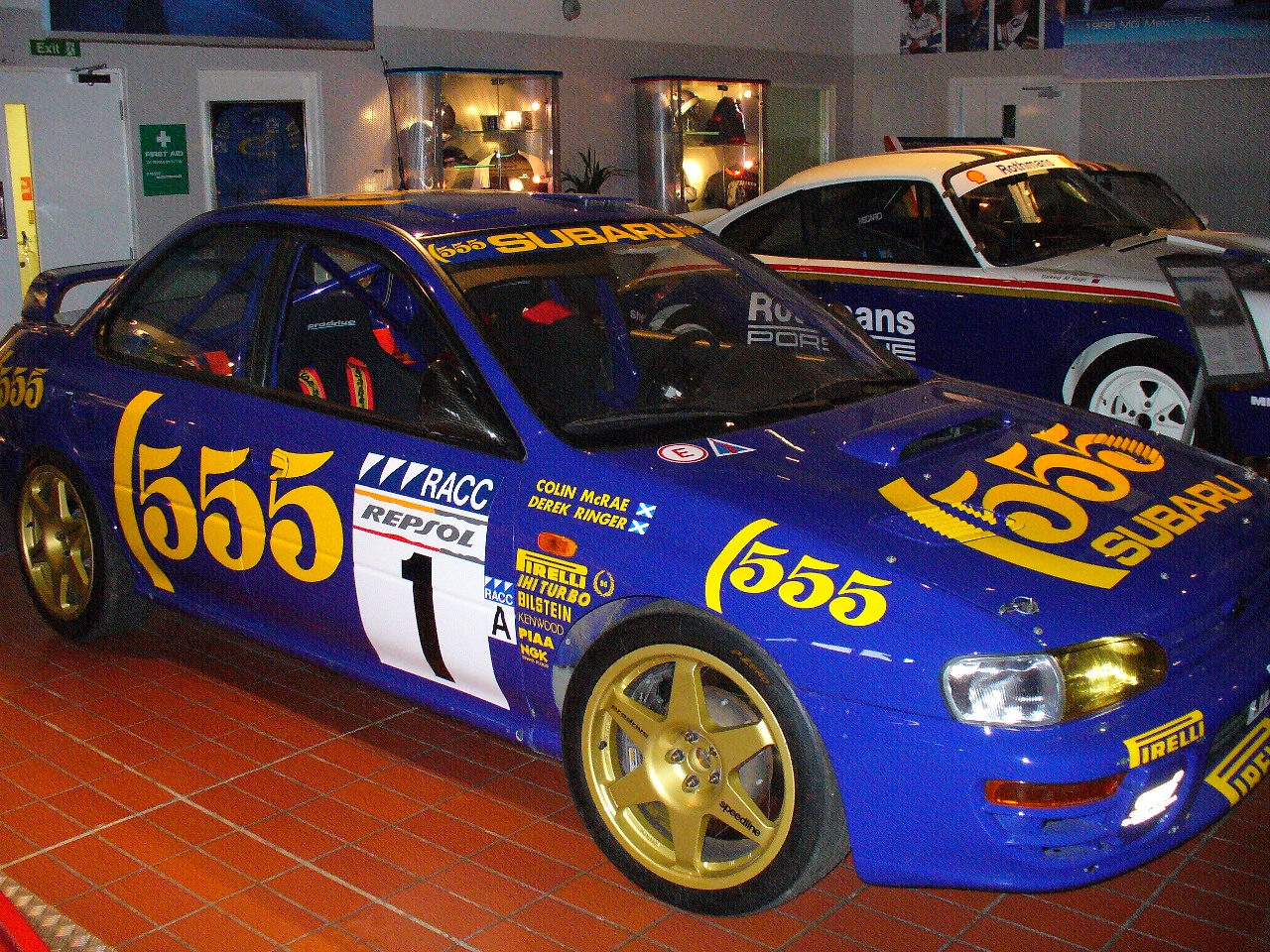
Colin McRae's 1996 Impreza 555

For the 1996 World Rally Championship season, Colin McRae was again the lead driver for Subaru. Following his 1995 Championship victory, his Impreza 555 wore the #1 plate. He was joined by team drivers Kenneth Eriksson, in the #2 car, and Piero Liatti, with their co-drivers, Staffan Parmander and Mario Ferfoglia, respectively. At the first event of the season, Rally Sweden, McRae took third, Eriksson took fifth, and Liatti took twelfth. 1994 World Drivers' Champion Didier Auriol also drove for the Subaru team in Sweden, taking his #3 car to tenth place. At the second round, the Safari Rally, Liatti's number was changed from #10 to #3. He took fifth place. McRae took fourth while Eriksson took second. At the Rally Indonesia, Liatti finished in second place, while McRae and Eriksson both retired following accidents. McRae's first victory of the season was at the Acropolis Rally, the fourth round of the championship. Liatti and Erikkson placed fourth and fifth respectively. Eriksson took third and Liatti fifth at Rally Argentina. McRae crashed out of Rally Argentina and the following event, Rally Finland. Liatti didn't compete in Finland, though Eriksson managed to finish in 5th place. McRae, Eriksson, and Liatti finished 4th, 2nd, and 7th respectively at Rally Australia. In Sanremo, McRae took victory, with Eriksson finishing in 5th. Liatti retired following an electrical failure. At the last round of the season, Rallye Catalunya, McRae took a second consecutive victory. Subaru took a 1–2 finish with Liatti finishing second. Eriksson finished in seventh position. Thanks to consistent podium finishes, Subaru successfully defended its Constructors' Championship, but McRae lost the Driver's Championship to Tommi Makinen.

=== 1997–1998 ===
For 1997, McRae again led the team, however his co-driver Derek Ringer was replaced by Welshman Nicky Grist. Secondary driver/co-driver teams included Piero Liatti/Fabrizia Pons (first in Monte Carlo), Olivier Burri/Christophe Hofmann and Kenneth Eriksson/Staffan Parmander (first in Sweden and New Zealand). Once again the team successfully defended its Constructors Championship, winning eight victories out of the fourteen rallies, but McRae again lost the Driver's Championship to Tommi Makinen, this time by just one point.

In 1998 the team had an almost unchanged line-up, although Juha Kangas/Pentti Kuukkala and Jarno Kytölehto/Arto Kapanen participated in one round each. McRae took wins in Portugal, Corsica and Greece. However, bad weather and mechanical failures hurt the team, and Subaru and McRae finished third in their respective championships. At the end of the season, McRae left the team to join Ford, with the tantalizing prospect of driving their brand-new car, the Ford Focus WRC.

=== 1999–2001 ===
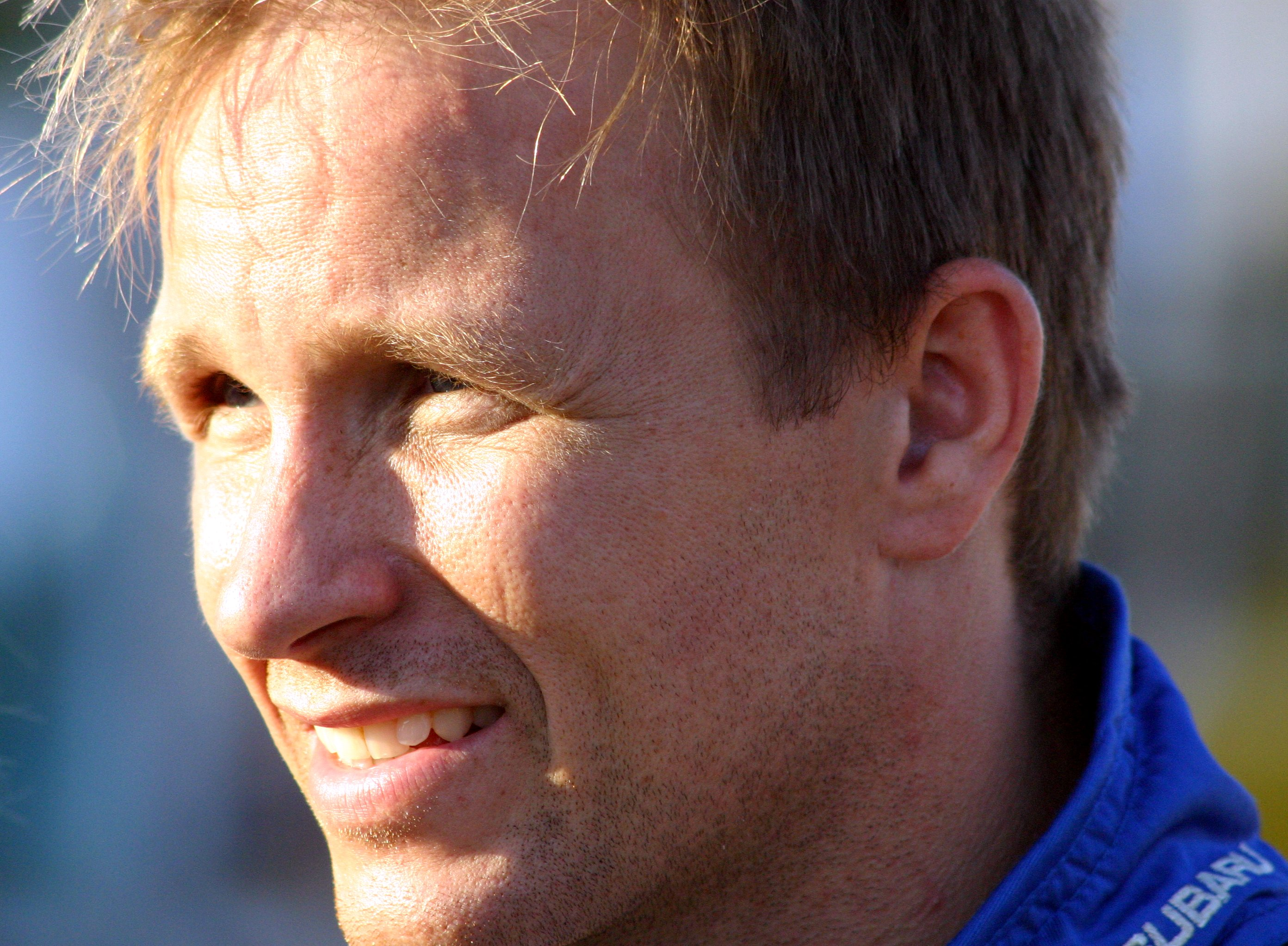
Petter Solberg

Subaru had an all new line up for the 1999 season, with the nominated driver/co-driver teams of Richard Burns/Robert Reid, Juha Kankkunen/Juha Repo, and third team of Bruno Thiry/Stéphane Prévot. The new car, the WRC99, featured an electronically controlled Paddle shifter with a drive-by-wire throttle. Due to technical difficulties, the team struggled until the season's 7th round in Argentina. From there on, the teams earned the podium in seven out of eight events, with five wins, three of which were 1–2 finishes. Subaru finished second in the Manufacturers' Championship, just four points behind Toyota. Burns scored victories in Greece, Australia, and Wales, for second place and Kankkunen took fourth in the Drivers' Championship, with wins in Argentina and Finland.

Burns and Kankkunen continued to drive for Subaru for the 2000 season, with Petter Solberg joining the team halfway through the season, driving in the Rallye de France. The team finished third in the championship, and Burns took second in the Drivers' Championship for the second year in a row.

Burns and Solberg composed Subaru's nominated line-up for the 2001 season with Markko Märtin/Michael Park and Toshi Arai/Tony Sircombe competing in selected events. Subaru again won the Driver's Championships in 2001 with Richard Burns and co-driver Robert Reid. Burns left Subaru for Peugeot at the end of the 2001 season.

=== 2002–2003 ===
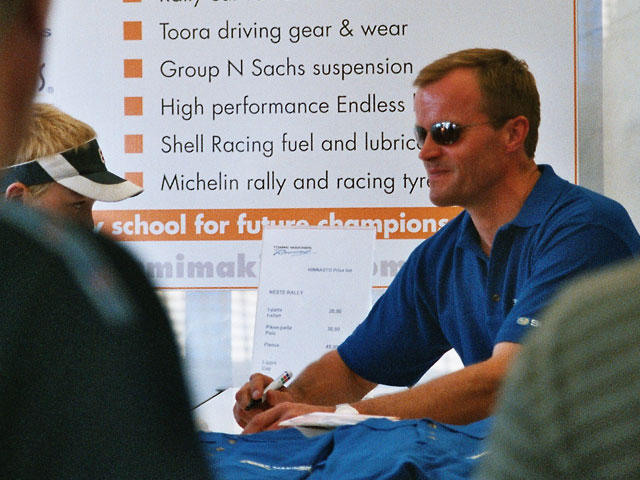
Tommi Mäkinen

For the 2002 season, Burns was replaced by Tommi Mäkinen and co-driver Kaj Lindström. Petter Solberg continued with the team, and Pasi Hagstrom was the team's test driver. Following the October 2001 signing of four time driver's Championship winner Mäkinen, expectations for the team ran high. However, after a season opening win in Monte Carlo, he was only able to finish five more events during the entire season. His teammate, Solberg fared much better, finishing nine events, five of which were podium finishes, including his first ever WRC win, at Rally Great Britain, the season's last round. The win propelled him past Ford's Carlos Sainz into second in the Drivers' Championship.

For the 2003 season, the driver line-up remained unchanged from the previous year. Solberg drove the #7 car, Mäkinen the #8 car. The season got off to a poor start, with neither driver finishing the Rallye Monte Carlo. Solberg then scored four outright wins, in Cyprus, Australia, France, and finished the season with his second straight win in Britain, securing him the Driver's Championship for himself and co-driver Phil Mills, narrowly beating Sébastien Loeb by one point. The team only managed to achieve third place in the manufacturers' championship, beaten by Citroën and Peugeot. At the end of the season, Tommi Mäkinen retired from the WRC.

=== 2004–2005 ===
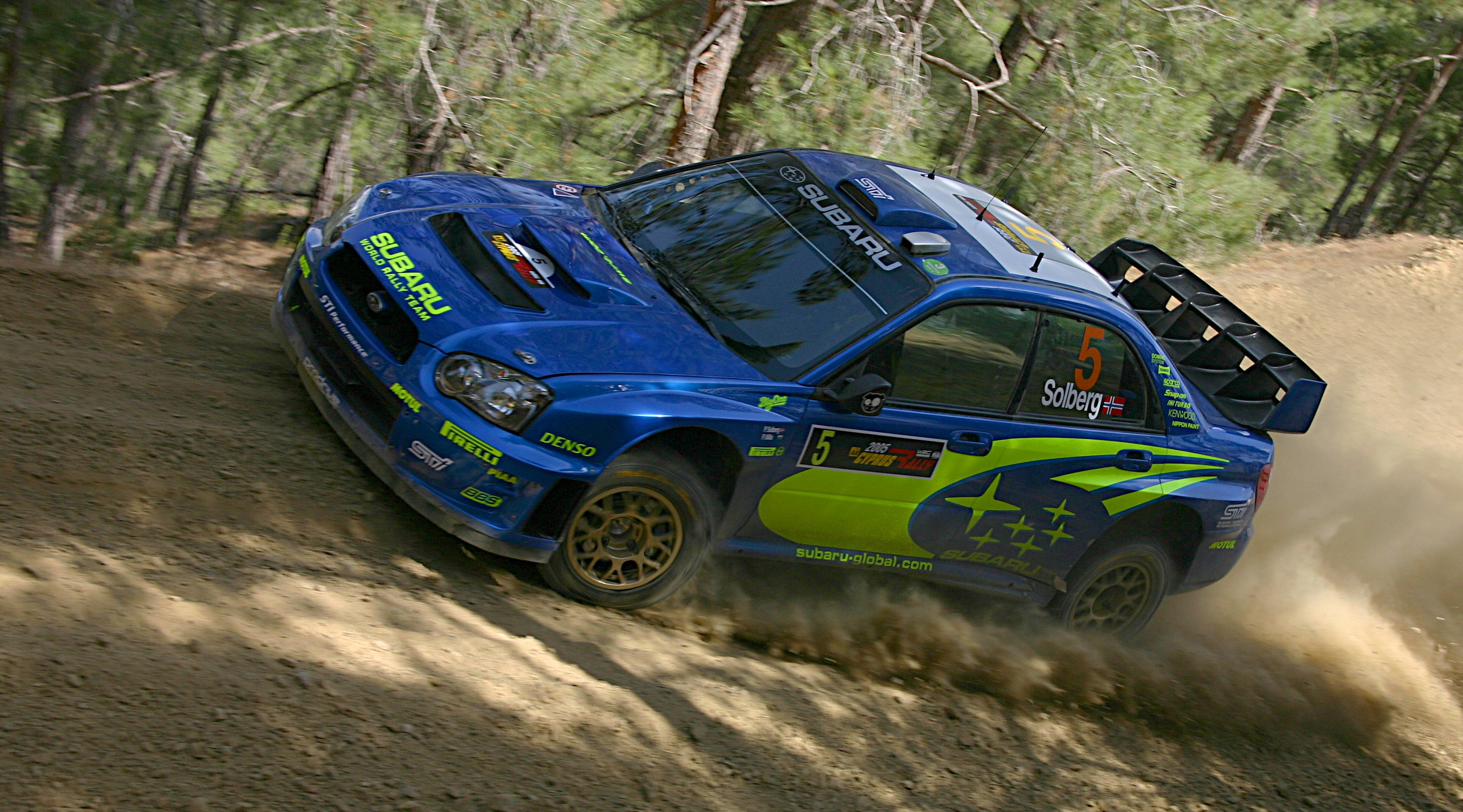
Subaru Impreza WRC2005 being driven by Petter Solberg at the Cyprus Rally

For the 2004 season, it was originally planned that Solberg would be partnered with the returning Richard Burns. However the Englishman would never get to return to the team because of a brain tumour he developed in late 2003, and would eventually pass away because of cancer in November 2005. Guy Wilks was also approached to join the team for the 2004 season, but missed out on this opportunity as he was under contract to Suzuki. Solberg was therefore joined by Finnish driver Mikko Hirvonen and his co-driver Jarmo Lehtinen. Subaru managed to consolidate third place in the Manufacturer's Championship again, while Solberg was second in the Driver's Championship, winning five of the season's rallies: New Zealand, Greece, Japan, Italy and a third consecutive win at Rally Wales. Hirvonen ended the season in seventh place, failing to impress the Subaru team management. He was not re-signed for the 2005 season.

In 2005, Petter Solberg again led the team in the #5 car, while Hirvonen was replaced by Chris Atkinson in the #6 car. The young Australian debuted with the Uddeholm Swedish Rally, and finished third at Rally Japan. Petter Solberg achieved back-to-back victories in Mexico and Sweden, early in the season. He finished the season behind Sébastien Loeb, tied for second place with Marcus Grönholm. In the Manufacturer's championship, Subaru only managed to finish fourth overall, ahead of Mitsubishi and Skoda.

=== 2006 ===
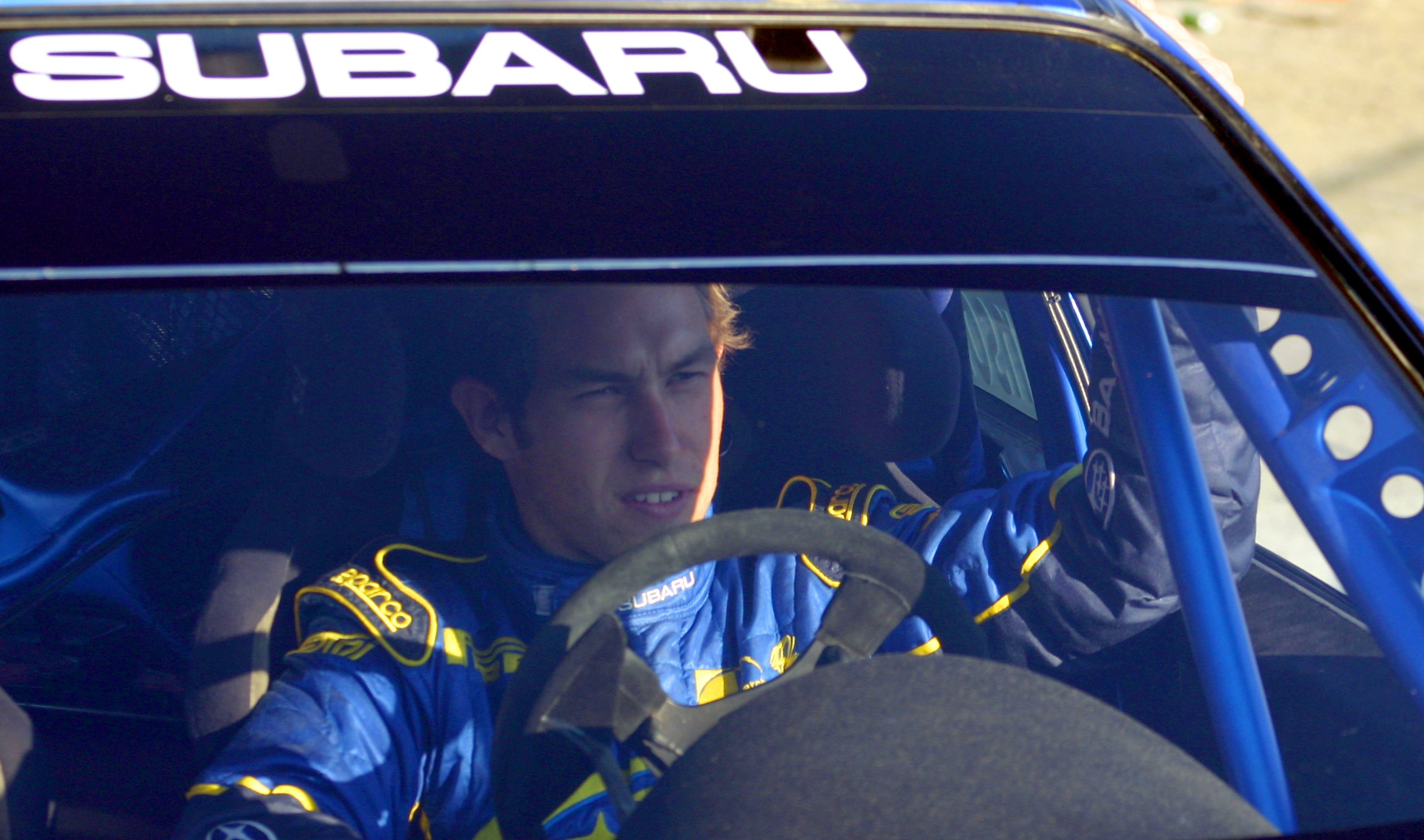
Chris Atkinson

Petter Solberg again led the team throughout the 2006 season, with the second car piloted by Chris Atkinson and co-driver Glenn MacNeall on gravel events, while on tarmac events, it was driven by ex-Formula One driver Stéphane Sarrazin. The WRC2006 had several changes from the previous year's car due to rule changes which banned active differentials as well as water injection, as well as mandating that teams must re-use cars and engines on selected 'pairs' of events. Due to the rule changes, the car was introduced on the first round of the season.

Subaru's season got off to a poor start, with Solberg unable to score in the first two rallies due to mechanical failures. Due to the teams lacklustre performance, after a decade of running the team, team boss David Lapworth was replaced by Paul Howarth. Not until the third rally of the season, Rally Mexico, would Petter manage to score, achieving a second-place finish. He picked up another second-place finish at Rally Argentina, and again at Rally Australia. The team finished the season in third place in the manufacturer's championship, while Solberg finished in sixth place in the driver's championship. However, the team was not able to achieve a single win, and achieved podium results only four times. Subaru's 2006 season was characterized as disappointing, and was the subject of a Discovery Channel series called Engineering the World Rally. In the programme, Subaru's dismal season was described as 'The Season from Hell'.

=== 2007 ===
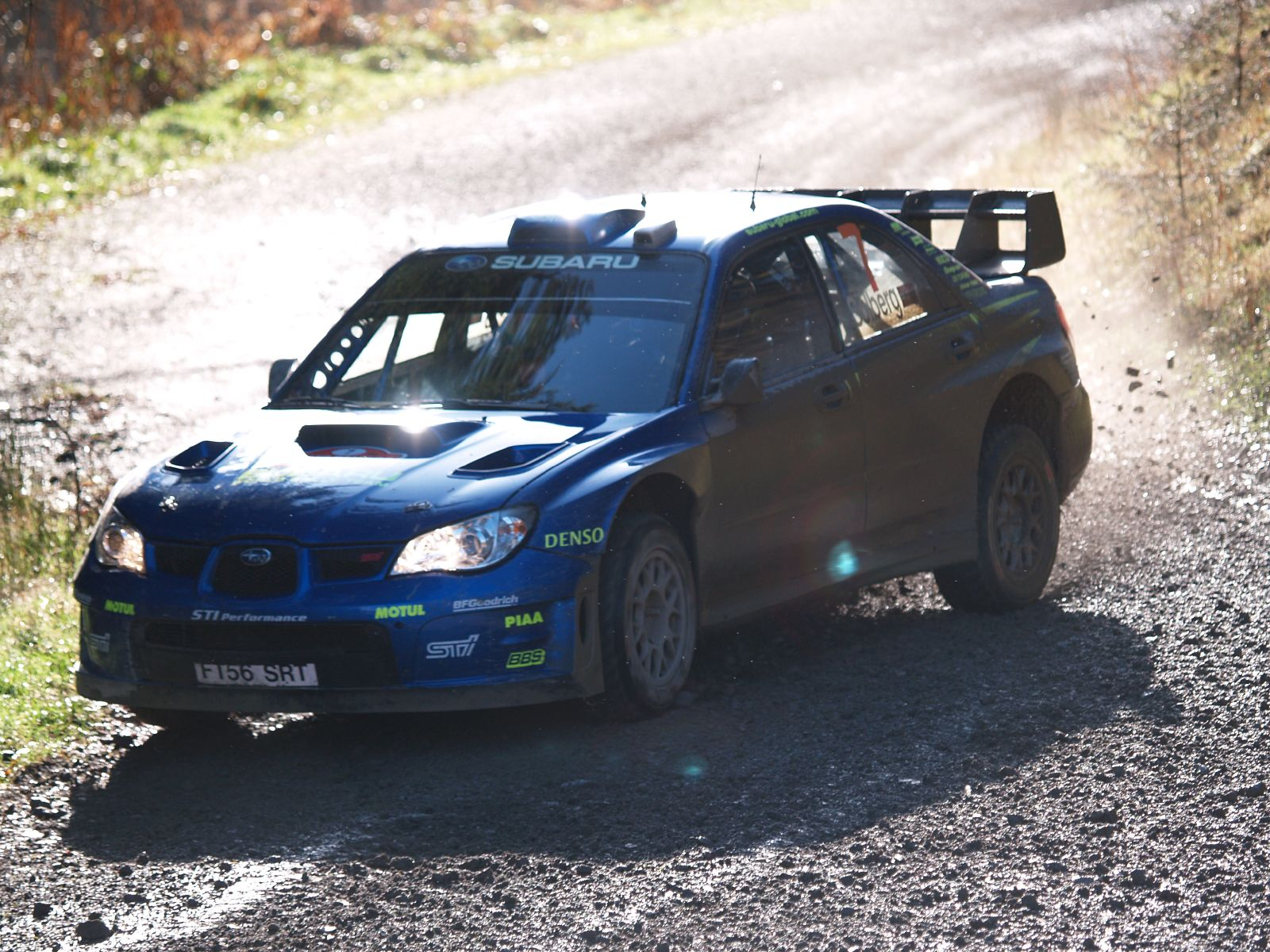
Solberg's WRC2007 at Rally GB

Solberg again led the team for the 2007 season, driving the #7 Impreza. Sarrazin left the team, leaving Chris Atkinson as the single number two driver, piloting the #8 car. Atkinson managed to grab fourth place at the season opening event in Monte Carlo, after passing the works Ford of Mikko Hirvonen. At the 2007 Rally Portugal, Solberg came in second, following the Ford cars' disqualification due to the glass in their rear windows being too thin. Following the rally, Atkinson's co-driver, Glenn MacNeall, elected to leave the team, and was replaced by Stéphane Prévot, who had previously been with the team as co-driver for Bruno Thiry. At the 2007 Acropolis Rally Solberg managed to achieve a podium position.

After the summer break, the team was joined at the 2007 Rally Finland by Xavier Pons and co-driver Xavier Amigo, driving a third car, #25, not nominated for manufacturer points. However, in the rally, Solberg had to retire on day two, after monstrous handling and steering problems which the team engineers were unable to deal with. Solberg finished fifth in Ireland, calling it "the most difficult rally he has ever done." At the final event of the season, Wales Rally GB, Solberg won the battle for fourth with Dani Sordo, propelling Subaru to third place in the manufacturer's standings. In the driver's championship, Solberg came in 5th, while Atkinson took 7th. Richard Taylor called the season a "poor" one, with Subaru only achieving two podium finishes, and no overall wins for the second year in a row. Phil Mills called it the "second season from hell."

=== 2008 ===
Petter Solberg and Chris Atkinson continued with the team through the 2008 season. Xavier Pons left the team. With the FIA mandated switch to Pirelli tires, tyre mousse had been banned, and fewer compounds were available.

At the first rally of the season, the 2008 Monte Carlo Rally, Atkinson scored his first podium finish on tarmac, after a close battle with François Duval while Solberg finished in fifth. In the 2008 Swedish Rally, Solberg finished in fourth place while Atkinson finished in 21st position following a spin on Special Stage 3, which cost him over 15 minutes. Immediately after the Swedish Rally, the team completed a gravel test in Spain, in preparation for Rally Mexico, the last test using the WRC2007 car. At the 2008 Rally Mexico, Atkinson placed second, his best ever result. Solberg was forced to retire on the second day after a driveshaft failure to his front left wheel. He continued under SupeRally rules on Sunday, finishing 12th. Going into the final day of the 2008 Rally Argentina, Solberg and Atkinson were comfortably in second and third position, poised to put two cars on the podium, a feat Subaru has not accomplished in several years. However, on Special Stage 19, Petter's car suffered an electrical failure, forcing him to retire. Atkinson inherited Solberg's position, and achieved a second-place finish for the second consecutive time. At the 2008 Jordan Rally, on SS6, Solberg's retired after his Impreza suffered from a damper failure, which then spilled oil, lighting a fire under the hood of the car. Solberg restarted under SupeRally rules on Saturday, but crashed on the day's final stage after brake problems. Atkinson managed to secure a third podium in a row, following the suspension failure of Latvala, and the retirements of Solberg and Loeb.

=== Withdrawal from WRC ===
On 16 December 2008, it was announced that Subaru would no longer be competing in the World Rally Championships. The decision was taken by Subaru's parent company, Fuji Heavy Industries (FHI), partly as a result of the economic downturn but also because it was felt Subaru had achieved its sporting and marketing objectives. Ikuo Mori denied that alterations to the WRC technical regulations in 2010 or a rumoured deterioration in the working relationship with Prodrive had any impact on the decision. He also said that the possibility of a Subaru car back in the top category of the WRC is not zero, but it remains unlikely for the foreseeable future.

== Vehicle development ==
=== Group A Leone, 1980–1989 ===
As Subaru Rally Team Japan, Subaru entered the first World Rally with the second generation Group A Subaru Leone DL at the 1980 Safari Rally. In 1984 the model was changed to the 3rd generation Leone coupé, one year later installed with a turbo. The other model used simultaneously with the coupé turbo until 1989 was the Leone sedan RX Turbo.

=== Group A Legacy RS, 1989–1993 ===
Prodrive's vehicle development began upon the team's formation in September 1989, creating the Group A Subaru Legacy RS rally car, based on the road going Subaru Legacy sedan. The Legacy was powered by a longitudinally mounted boxer engine, giving it a low centre of gravity. Already equipped with a symmetrical all wheel drive system, it made a good starting point for a rally car. David Lapworth described the development of the car as a "steep learning curve." The car lacked power and a weak transmission and braking system also hampered the car. To correct its flaws, Prodrive completed a new car, the 1992 Legacy RS, which featured a totally redesigned fuel injection system, during the 1991 season, introduced on the season's last rally. The team campaigned the 1992 Legacy during the first part of the 1993 season, and on its last rally, achieved the car's first and only win.

=== Vehicle preparation ===
Before each rally, each bodyshell is completely rebuilt. In 1993, each bodyshell rebuild took 160 hours. In 2003 it took 650 man hours. In 2006 it took 780 hours.

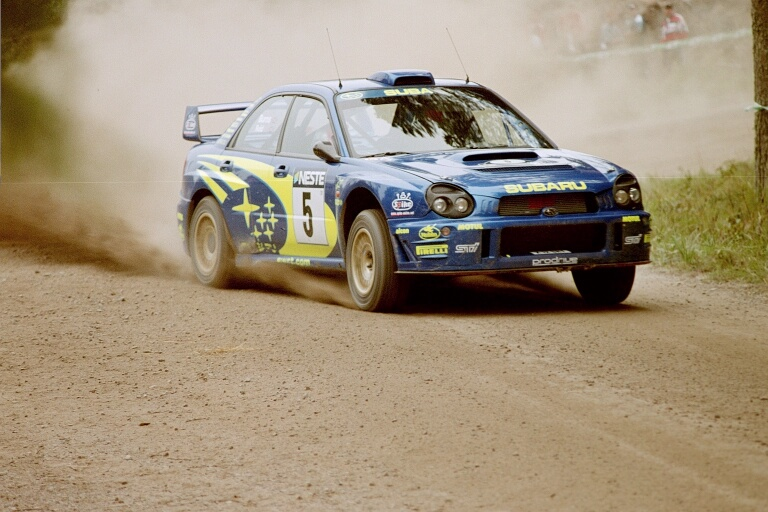
Burns' WRC2001

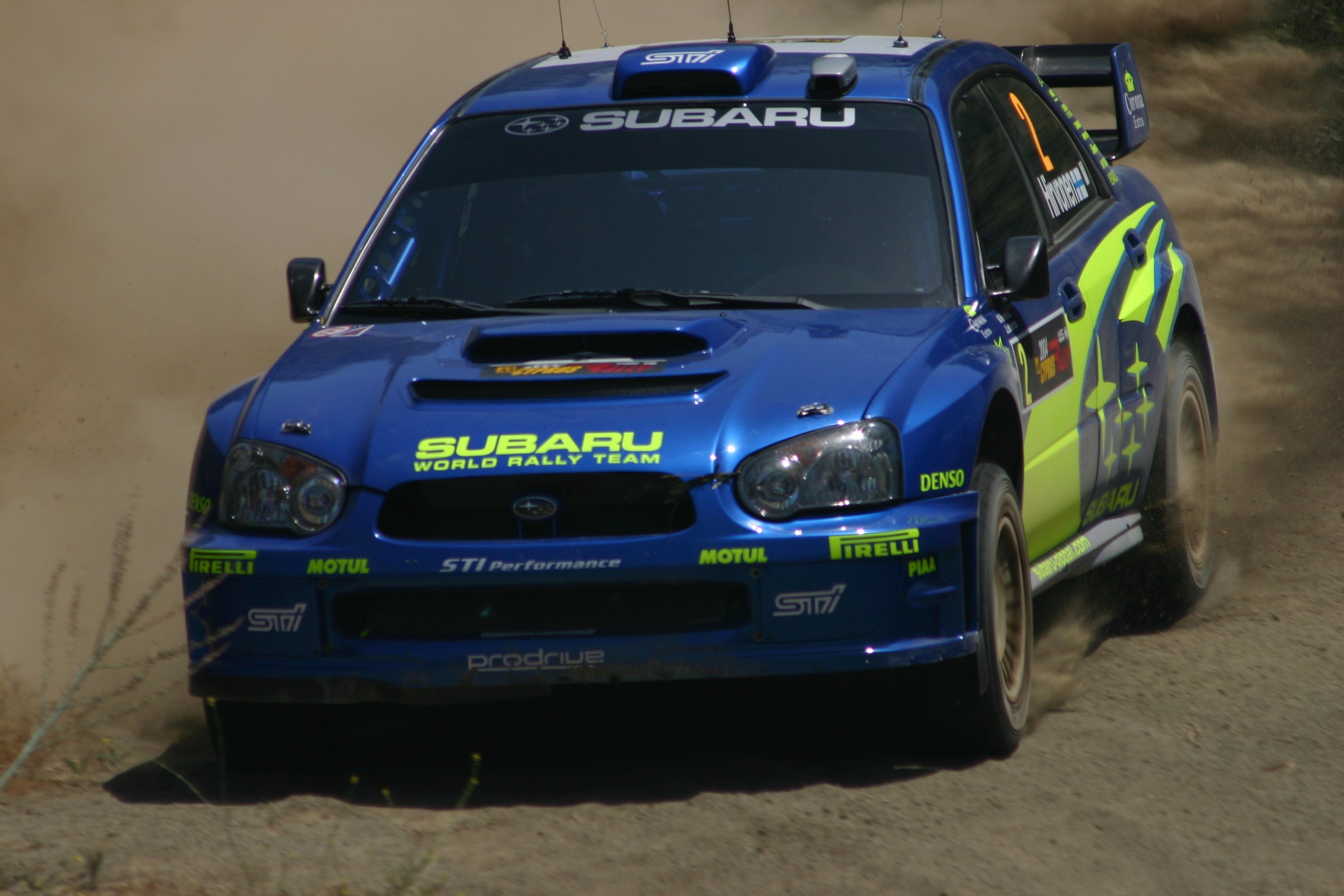
Hirvonen's WRC2004

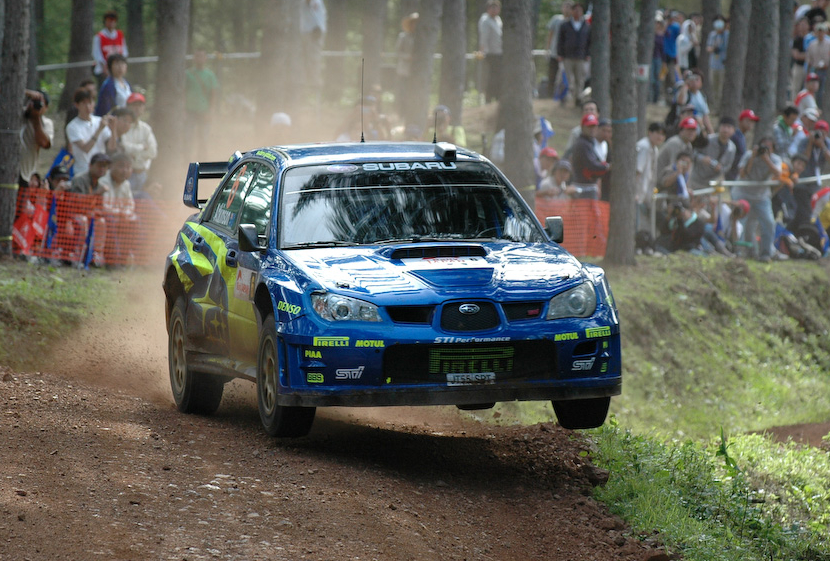
Atkinson's WRC2006

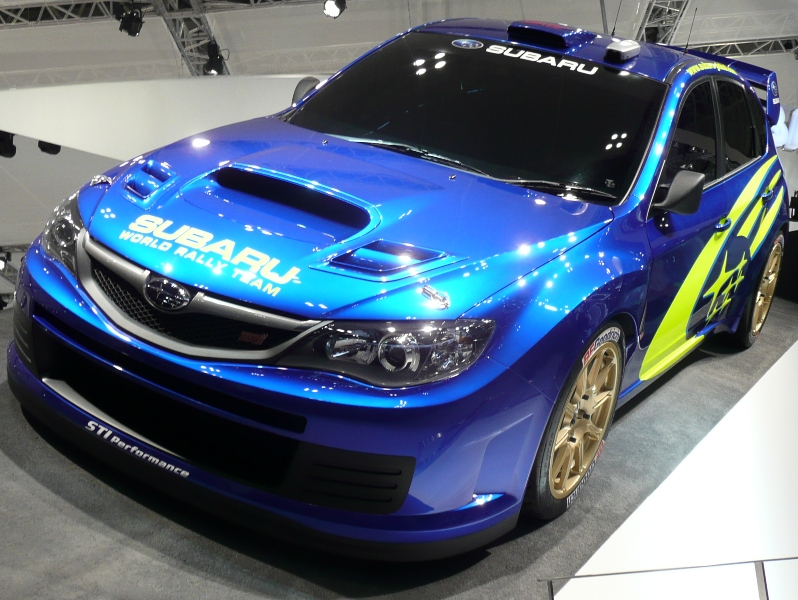
Prototype of the WRC2008

== Technical personnel ==
Graham Moore is the overall chief engineer. Moore was a member of the team from 1991 to 2002, and then rejoined the team in 2006. Jonathan Carey is the chief engineer for Petter Solberg and Richard Thompson is the chief engineer for Chris Atkinson. Chris Wattam is the chief mechanic.

== See also ==
- David Richards
- BP Ford World Rally Team
- Suzuki World Rally Team
- Citroën Total World Rally Team

== Notes ==
Note on vehicle nomenclature: Prodrive and Subaru have different nomenclature for the same vehicles. In information published by the Subaru World Rally Team, for cars produced from 1997 to 2000, the car is referred to as the WRCXX, with XX being the last two digits of the year it was produced, e.g. WRC99. For years 2000 forward, the car is referred to as the WRCXXXX, XXXX being the year it was produced, e.g. WRC2003. Prodrive, however, refers to the cars using a different nomenclature. The earliest record of this occurred with the WRC99, which Prodrive referred to as the S5. Each following car got a new designation: the WRC2000 is equivalent to the S6, WRC2001 is equivalent to the S7, WRC2002 is equivalent to the S8, WRC2003 is equivalent to the S9, WRC2004 is equivalent to the S10, WRC2005 is equivalent to the S11, WRC2006 is equivalent to the S12, and the WRC2007 is equivalent to the S12b, and the WRC2008 is equivalent to the S14. The S12b Imprezas that were used in 2008 before the S14 came, due to some differences, are sometimes referred to as S12c; however, this nomenclature is not official. This article will use the Subaru World Rally Team's nomenclature.
