= Škoda Motorsport WRC results =

The table below shows all results of Škoda Motorsport in World Rally Championship.

== 2L-MC era (1993–1997) ==
Year	Car	Driver	1	2	3	4	5	6	7	8	9	10	11	12	13	14	2L MC	Points
1993	Škoda Favorit 136L	(Czech Republic) Pavel Sibera	MON; 4	SWE; 3	POR; 2	KEN	FRA	GRC; Ret	ARG	NZL	FIN; 2	AUS	ITA; 5	ESP; 5	GBR; 3		2nd	54
1993	Škoda Favorit 136L	(Czech Republic) Emil Triner	MON; 6	SWE; 4	POR; Ret	KEN	FRA	GRC; 1	ARG	NZL	FIN; 3	AUS	ITA; 4	ESP; 6	GBR; 2		2nd	54
1994	Škoda Favorit 136L	(Czech Republic) Emil Triner	SWE; 7	POR; 3	GRC; 1	FIN; 4	AUS; Ret	ITA; 4	ESP; 5	GBR; 7							1st	43
1994	Škoda Favorit 136L	(Czech Republic) Jindřich Štolfa	SWE; 8	POR	GRC	FIN	AUS	ITA	ESP; 6	GBR							1st	43
1994	Škoda Favorit 136L	(Czech Republic) Pavel Sibera	SWE	POR; 2	GRC; 2	FIN; 3	AUS; 1	ITA; Ret	ESP	GBR; 6							1st	43
1995	Škoda Favorit 136L	(Czech Republic) Emil Triner	MON	SWE; 5	POR; Ret	KEN	FRA; Ret	GRC; Ret	ARG; 3	NZL	FIN; 5	ITA; 4					3rd	174
1995	Škoda Favorit 136L	(Czech Republic) Pavel Sibera	MON	SWE; 6	POR; Ret	KEN	FRA; Ret	GRC; 4	ARG; 1	NZL	FIN; 4	ITA; Ret					3rd	174
1995	Škoda Favorit 136L	(Sweden) Björn Johansson	MON	SWE; Ret	POR	KEN	FRA	GRC	ARG	NZL	FIN	ITA					3rd	174
1996	Škoda Felicia Kit Car	(Czech Republic) Emil Triner	MON; 5	POR; 6	FRA	ARG; 3	NZL; 1	AUS; 3	ESP; 9	GBR; Ret							3rd	264
1996	Škoda Felicia Kit Car	(Czech Republic) Pavel Sibera	MON; 4	POR; 2	FRA	ARG; 4	NZL; Ret	AUS; 1	ESP; 10	GBR; Ret							3rd	264
1996	Škoda Felicia Kit Car	(Sweden) Stig Blomqvist	MON	POR	FRA	ARG	NZL	AUS; Ret	ESP	GBR; 1							3rd	264
1996	Škoda Felicia Kit Car	(Belgium) Bernard Munster	MON	POR	FRA	ARG	NZL	AUS	ESP; Ret	GBR; 11							3rd	264
1996	Škoda Felicia Kit Car	(United Kingdom) Tiff Needell	MON	POR	FRA	ARG	NZL	AUS	ESP	GBR; 27							3rd	264
1996	Škoda Felicia Kit Car	(United Kingdom) Dave Jennings	MON	POR	FRA	ARG	NZL	AUS	ESP	GBR; 29							3rd	264
1997	Škoda Felicia Kit Car	(Czech Republic) Emil Triner	MON; 1	SWE; 5	KEN	POR; Ret	ESP; Ret	FRA	ARG; Ret	GRC; 4	NZL	FIN; 7	IDN		AUS; Ret	GBR	2nd	44
1997	Škoda Octavia Kit Car	(Czech Republic) Emil Triner												ITA; Ret			2nd	44
1997	Škoda Felicia Kit Car	(Czech Republic) Pavel Sibera	MON; 2	SWE; Ret	KEN	POR; 4	ESP; Ret	FRA	ARG; 3	GRC; 2	NZL	FIN; Ret	IDN		AUS; 2	GBR	2nd	44
1997	Škoda Octavia Kit Car	(Czech Republic) Pavel Sibera												ITA; Ret			2nd	44
1997	Škoda Felicia Kit Car	(Czech Republic) Jindřich Štolfa	MON	SWE	KEN	POR	ESP	FRA	ARG	GRC	NZL	FIN; 8	IDN	ITA; Ret	AUS	GBR	2nd	44
1997	Škoda Felicia Kit Car	(Italy) Fabio Danti	MON	SWE	KEN	POR	ESP	FRA	ARG	GRC	NZL	FIN	IDN	ITA; 3	AUS	GBR	2nd	44

== Octavia Kit Car era (1998) ==
Year	Car	No	Driver	1	2	3	4	5	6	7	8	9	10	11	12	WDC	Points
1998	Škoda Octavia Kit Car	(Czech Republic) Pavel Sibera	MON	SWE	KEN	POR	ESP; Ret	FRA; Ret	ARG	GRE; 21	NZL	FIN; 25	ITA; Ret	AUS	GBR	–	0
1998	Škoda Octavia Kit Car	(Italy) Fabio Danti	MON	SWE	KEN	POR	ESP	FRA	ARG	GRE	NZL	FIN	ITA; 26	AUS	GBR	–	0

== WRC era (1999–2005) ==
Year	Car	No	Driver	1	2	3	4	5	6	7	8	9	10	11	12	13	14	15	16	WDC	Points	WMC	Points
1999	Škoda Octavia WRC	11	(Germany) Armin Schwarz	MON; Ret	SWE	KEN	POR; Ret	ESP; Ret	FRA	ARG	GRE; 12	NZL	FIN; Ret	CHN	ITA; Ret	AUS	GBR; Ret			–	0	7th	6
1999	Škoda Octavia WRC	12	(Czech Republic) Pavel Sibera	MON; Ret	SWE	KEN		ESP; Ret												–	0	7th	6
1999	Škoda Octavia WRC	12	(Czech Republic) Emil Triner				POR; Ret		FRA	ARG	GRE; 13	NZL	FIN; 14	CHN	ITA; 23	AUS				–	0	7th	6
1999	Škoda Octavia WRC	12	(Belgium) Bruno Thiry														GBR; 4			14th*	3	7th	6
2000	Škoda Octavia WRC	11	(Germany) Armin Schwarz	MON; 7	SWE	KEN; 7	POR; 8	ESP; 11	ARG	GRE; 5	NZL	FIN	CYP; Ret	FRA	ITA; 12	AUS	GBR; 13			18th	2	7th	8
2000	Škoda Octavia WRC	12	(Spain) Luís Climent	MON; 10	SWE	KEN; 8	POR; 12	ESP; Ret	ARG	GRE; Ret	NZL	FIN	CYP; Ret	FRA	ITA; 14	AUS	GBR; 16			–	0	7th	8
2001	Škoda Octavia WRC Evo2	11	(Germany) Armin Schwarz	MON; 4	SWE; Ret	POR; Ret	ESP; Ret	ARG; Ret	CYP; 9	GRE; 7	KEN; 3	FIN; 15	NZL	ITA; Ret	FRA; Ret	AUS	GBR; 5			12th	9	5th	17
2001	Škoda Octavia WRC Evo2	12	(Belgium) Bruno Thiry	MON; 8	SWE; 10	POR; Ret	ESP; 10	ARG; Ret	CYP; 8	GRE; 10	KEN; Ret	FIN; 18	NZL	ITA; 13	FRA; Ret	AUS	GBR; 8			–	0	5th	17
2001	Škoda Octavia WRC Evo2	–	(Czech Republic) Roman Kresta	MON	SWE	POR	ESP	ARG	CYP	GRC	KEN; Ret	FIN	NZL	ITA; Ret	FRA	AUS	GBR; Ret			–	0	5th	17
2002	Škoda Octavia WRC Evo2	15	(Finland) Toni Gardemeister	MON; 10	SWE; Ret	FRA; 12	ESP; 11	CYP; 15	ARG; 5	GRE; 10	KEN; Ret	FIN; 12	GER; Ret	ITA; Ret	NZL; 8	AUS; 6	GBR; 10			13th	3	5th	9
2002	Škoda Octavia WRC Evo2	14	(Sweden) Kenneth Eriksson	MON; 13	SWE; Ret	FRA; Ret	ESP; 17	CYP; 9	ARG; 6	GRE; 14	KEN; Ret	FIN; Ret	GER; 10	ITA; 11	NZL; Ret	AUS; 8	GBR; 13			17th	1	5th	9
2002	Škoda Octavia WRC Evo2	16	(Czech Republic) Roman Kresta	MON; Ret		FRA; 14		CYP; Ret			KEN; 7	FIN		ITA; 12	NZL	AUS	GBR; 15			–	0	5th	9
2002	Škoda Octavia WRC Evo2	16	(Sweden) Stig Blomqvist		SWE; 15		ESP; Ret			GRE; 17										–	0	5th	9
2002	Škoda Octavia WRC Evo2	16	(Argentina) Gabriel Pozzo						ARG; 9											–	0	5th	9
2002	Škoda Octavia WRC Evo2	16	(Germany) Matthias Kahle										GER; Ret							–	0	5th	9
2002	Škoda Octavia WRC Evo2	–	(Argentina) Gabriel Pozzo	MON	SWE	FRA	ESP; Ret	CYP; 9		GRE; Ret	KEN	FIN	GER	ITA	NZL	AUS	GBR			–	0	5th	9
2003	Škoda Octavia WRC Evo3	14	(France) Didier Auriol	MON; 9	SWE; 18	TUR; Ret	NZL; 8	ARG; 6	GRE; 9	CYP; Ret										13th	4	5th	23
2003	Škoda Fabia WRC	14	(France) Didier Auriol								GER; Ret	FIN; Ret	AUS; 12	ITA; 12	FRA; Ret	ESP; Ret	GBR; 11			13th	4	5th	23
2003	Škoda Octavia WRC Evo3	15	(Finland) Toni Gardemeister	MON; Ret	SWE; 8	TUR; 7	NZL; 5	ARG; 7	GRE; Ret	CYP; Ret										12th	9	5th	23
2003	Škoda Fabia WRC	15	(Finland) Toni Gardemeister								GER; Ret	FIN; Ret	AUS; 11	ITA; Ret	FRA; 11	ESP; 12	GBR; Ret			12th	9	5th	23
2003	Škoda Octavia WRC Evo3	–	(Argentina) Gabriel Pozzo	MON	SWE	TUR	NZL	ARG; Ret	GRE	CYP	GER	FIN	AUS	ITA	FRA	ESP	GBR			–	0	5th	23
2003	Škoda Octavia WRC Evo3	–	(Czech Republic) Jan Kopecký	MON	SWE	TUR	NZL	ARG	GRE	CYP	GER; 20	FIN	AUS	ITA	FRA	ESP	GBR; Ret			–	0	5th	23
2004**	Škoda Fabia WRC	–	(Finland) Toni Gardemeister	MON	SWE	MEX	NZL	CYP	GRE; Ret	TUR	ARG	FIN; 8	GER; 7	JPN	GBR; 22	ITA; Ret	FRA; 9	ESP; 9	AUS	24th	3	–	0
2004**	Škoda Fabia WRC	–	(Germany) Armin Schwarz	MON	SWE	MEX	NZL	CYP	GRE; Ret	TUR	ARG	FIN; 12	GER; 11	JPN	GBR; Ret	ITA; Ret	FRA; 8	ESP; 11	AUS	33rd	1	–	0
2004**	Škoda Fabia WRC	–	(Finland) Jani Paasonen	MON	SWE	MEX	NZL	CYP	GRE	TUR	ARG	FIN; 6	GER	JPN	GBR; Ret	ITA	FRA	ESP	AUS	21st	3	–	0
2004**	Škoda Fabia WRC	-	(Czech Republic) Roman Kresta	MON	SWE	MEX	NZL	CYP	GRE	TUR	ARG	FIN	GER; Ret	JPN	GBR	ITA	FRA	ESP	AUS	–	0	–	0
2004**	Škoda Fabia WRC	-	(Czech Republic) Jan Kopecký	MON	SWE	MEX	NZL	CYP	GRE	TUR	ARG	FIN	GER	JPN	GBR	ITA	FRA	ESP; Ret	AUS	–	0	–	0
2005	Škoda Fabia WRC	11	(Germany) Armin Schwarz	MON; Ret		MEX; 9	NZL; 10	ITA; Ret	CYP; 13	TUR; Ret	GRE; 18	ARG; 16	FIN; 11	GER; Ret	GBR; 14	JPN; 10	FRA; Ret	ESP; 11	AUS; 8	27th	1	6th	21
2005	Škoda Fabia WRC	11	(Sweden) Mattias Ekström		SWE; 10														–	0		6th	21
2005	Škoda Fabia WRC	12	(France) Alexandre Bengué	MON; 9										GER; Ret			FRA; 6	ESP; Ret		21st	3	6th	21
2005	Škoda Fabia WRC	12	(Finland) Janne Tuohino		SWE; Ret		NZL; Ret	ITA; 13	CYP; 9	TUR; 13	GRE; Ret									–	0	6th	21
2005	Škoda Fabia WRC	12	(Finland) Jani Paasonen			MEX; 13						ARG; Ret	FIN; Ret							–	0	6th	21
2005	Škoda Fabia WRC	12	(Scotland) Colin McRae												GBR; 7				AUS; Ret	22nd	2	6th	21
2005	Škoda Fabia WRC	12	(Finland) Mikko Hirvonen													JPN; Ret				10th*	14*	6th	21
2005	Škoda Fabia WRC	–	(Finland) Jani Paasonen		SWE; Ret						GRE; Ret									–	0	6th	21
2005	Škoda Fabia WRC	–	(Finland) Janne Tuohino										FIN; 10							–	0	6th	21
2005	Škoda Fabia WRC	–	(Czech Republic) Jan Kopecký											GER; 11			FRA; 12	ESP; 8		26th	1	6th	21

- Including points that Bruno Thiry gathered in 1999 season with different teams.
- Škoda Motorsport didn't compete in 2004 season as manufacturer team.
- Including points that Mikko Hirvonen scored in 2005 season with different teams.

== Czech Rally Team Kopecký (2006–2007) ==
Year	Car	Driver	1	2	3	4	5	6	7	8	9	10	11	12	13	14	15	16	WDC	Points
2006	Škoda Fabia WRC	(Czech Republic) Jan Kopecký	MON; 11	SWE; 13	MEX	ESP; 5	FRA; 10	ARG	ITA; 17	GRC; 16	GER; 7	FIN; 8	JPN	CYP	TUR; Ret	AUS	NZL	GBR; 10	15th	7
2007	Škoda Fabia WRC	(Czech Republic) Jan Kopecký	MON; 8	SWE; 10	NOR; 8	MEX	POR; 20	ARG	ITA; Ret	GRE; 7	FIN; Ret	GER; 5	NZL	ESP; Ret	FRA; 7	JPN	IRE	GBR; 12	12th	10

== First Motorsport Škoda (2006–2007) ==
Year	Car	Driver	1	2	3	4	5	6	7	8	9	10	11	12	13	14	15	16	WDC	Points
2006	Škoda Fabia WRC	(Belgium) François Duval	MON; Ret	SWE	MEX	ESP; 6	FRA; Ret	ARG	ITA; 8	GRC; 13	GER; Ret	FIN	JPN	CYP	TUR; 9	AUS	NZL	GBR; 8	19th	5
2007	Škoda Fabia WRC	(Belgium) François Duval	MON	SWE	NOR	MEX	POR	ARG	ITA	GRE; Ret	FIN	GER	NZL	ESP	FRA	JPN	IRE	GBR	–	0

== Red Bull Škoda (2006, 2009–2011) ==
Red Bull Škoda was run as Manufacturer team with WRC cars only in 2006 season. It returned for PWRC in 2009 and SWRC in 2010 and 2011 with Škoda Fabia S2000.

Year	Car	No	Driver	1	2	3	4	5	6	7	8	9	10	11	12	13	14	15	16	WDC	Points	WMC	Points
2006	Škoda Fabia WRC	11	(France) Gilles Panizzi	MON; 10		MEX	ESP; 10													–	0	6th	24
2006	Škoda Fabia WRC	11	(Sweden) Mattias Ekström		SWE; Ret							GER; 11								–	0	6th	24
2006	Škoda Fabia WRC	11	(Finland) Harri Rovanperä					FRA; 12	ARG	ITA; 20	GRC; 12		FIN	JPN	CYP; Ret	TUR; 11	AUS	NZL	GBR; 9	–	0	6th	24
2006	Škoda Fabia WRC	12	(Austria) Andreas Aigner	MON; 13	SWE; Ret	MEX	ESP; 13	FRA; 15	ARG	ITA; 13	GRC; 14	GER; 6	FIN	JPN	CYP; Ret	TUR; 10	AUS	NZL	GBR; Ret	23rd	3	6th	24
2009	Škoda Fabia S2000	46	(Sweden) Patrik Sandell	IRE	NOR; 12	CYP; 9	POR; Ret	ARG	ITA; 10	GRE; 24	POL	FIN	AUS	ESP	GBR; 21					0	–	–	–
2010	Škoda Fabia S2000	24	(Sweden) Patrik Sandell	SWE; 15	MEX	JOR; 23	TUR	NZL; 12	POR	BUL	FIN; 11	DEU; 10	JPN	FRA; 10	ESP	GBR; 14				19th	2	–	–
2011	Škoda Fabia S2000	25	(Finland) Juho Hänninen	SWE	MEX; 8	POR	JOR	ITA; 8	ARG	GRE; 8	FIN; 10	DEU; 20	AUS	FRA; 26	ESP; 10	GBR				16th*	14*	–	–
2011	Škoda Fabia S2000	27	(Germany) Hermann Gassner, Jr.	SWE	MEX	POR	JOR; 12	ITA; 16	ARG	GRE; 14	FIN; 16	DEU; 32	AUS	FRA; Ret	ESP; 18	GBR				-*	0*	–	–
2011	Škoda Fabia S2000	18	(Sweden) Patrik Sandell	SWE; 11	MEX	POR	JOR	ITA	ARG	GRE	FIN	DEU	AUS	FRA	ESP	GBR				–	0	–	–

=== PWRC results ===
Year	Car	No	Driver	1	2	3	4	5	6	7	8	PWRC	Points
2009	Škoda Fabia S2000	46	(Sweden) Patrik Sandell	NOR; 1	CYP; 1	POR; Ret	ARG	ITA; 2	GRE; 11	AUS	GBR; 7	4th	30

=== SWRC results ===
Year	Car	No	Driver	1	2	3	4	5	6	7	8	9	10	SWRC	Points	Teams*	Points
2010	Škoda Fabia S2000	24	(Sweden) Patrik Sandell	SWE; 4	MEX	JOR; 5	NZL; 4	POR	FIN; 3	GER; 1	JPN	FRA; 1	GBR; 4	2nd	112	1st	126
2011	Škoda Fabia S2000	25	(Finland) Juho Hänninen	MEX; 2	JOR	ITA; 2	GRE; 1	FIN; 1	GER; 4	FRA; 5	ESP; 1			1st	138	–	–
2011	Škoda Fabia S2000	27	(Germany) Hermann Gassner, Jr.	MEX	JOR; 3	ITA; 5	GRE; 4	FIN; 4	GER; 7	FRA; Ret	ESP; 5			5th	65	–	–

* WRC Cup for Super 2000 Teams championship

== WRC2 era (2013, 2015–) ==
Year	Entrant	Car	No	Driver	1	2	3	4	5	6	7	8	9	10	11	12	13	14	WRC-2	Points	Teams	Points
2013	Škoda Motorsport	Škoda Fabia S2000	31	(Finland) Esapekka Lappi	MON; Ret	SWE	MEX	POR; 1	ARG	GRE	ITA	FIN	GER	AUS	FRA	ESP	GBR		10th	25	16th	25
2013	Škoda Auto Deutschland	Škoda Fabia S2000	32	(Germany) Sepp Wiegand	MON; 1	SWE; 3	MEX	POR; 3	ARG	GRE	ITA; Ret	FIN	GER; 4	AUS	FRA	ESP; Ret	GBR		6th	67	4th	79
2015	Škoda Motorsport	Škoda Fabia R5	–	(Finland) Esapekka Lappi	MON	SWE	MEX	ARG	POR; 2	ITA; 9	POL; 1	FIN; 1	GER; 13	AUS	FRA; 2	ESP; Ret	GBR		3rd	88	1st	150
2015	Škoda Motorsport	Škoda Fabia R5	–	(Sweden) Pontus Tidemand	MON	SWE	MEX	ARG	POR; 3	ITA	POL; 2	FIN; 2	GER	AUS	FRA; Ret	ESP; 1	GBR		4th	86	1st	150
2015	Škoda Motorsport	Škoda Fabia R5	–	(Czech Republic) Jan Kopecký	MON	SWE	MEX	ARG	POR	ITA; 3	POL	FIN	GER; 1	AUS	FRA	ESP; 2	GBR		7th	58	1st	150
2016	Škoda Motorsport	Škoda Fabia R5	–	(Finland) Esapekka Lappi	MON	SWE; 3	MEX	ARG	POR	ITA; 9	POL; 3	FIN; 1	GER; 1	CHN; C	FRA	ESP	GBR; 1	AUS; 1	1st	130	1st	219
2016	Škoda Motorsport	Škoda Fabia R5	–	(Sweden) Pontus Tidemand	MON	SWE; 2	MEX	ARG	POR; 1	ITA	POL; 7	FIN; Ret	GER	CHN; C	FRA	ESP; 2	GBR; 3	AUS	5th	85	1st	219
2016	Škoda Motorsport	Škoda Fabia R5	–	(Czech Republic) Jan Kopecký	MON	SWE	MEX	ARG	POR; 10	ITA; 2	POL	FIN	GER; 2	CHN; C	FRA; 2	ESP; 1	GBR; 4	AUS; WD	4th	92	1st	219
2017	Škoda Motorsport	Škoda Fabia R5	–	(Norway) Andreas Mikkelsen	MON; 1	SWE	MEX	FRA; 1	ARG	POR; Ret	ITA	POL	FIN	GER	ESP	GBR	AUS		9th	50	1st	193
2017	Škoda Motorsport	Škoda Fabia R5	–	(Czech Republic) Jan Kopecký	MON; 2	SWE	MEX	FRA; 7	ARG	POR	ITA; 1	POL	FIN	GER; 2	ESP; 2	GBR	AUS		4th	85	1st	193
2017	Škoda Motorsport	Škoda Fabia R5	–	(Sweden) Pontus Tidemand	MON	SWE; 1	MEX; 1	FRA	ARG; 1	POR; 1	ITA	POL; 2	FIN	GER; 3	ESP	GBR; 1	AUS		1st	143	1st	193
2017	Škoda Motorsport	Škoda Fabia R5	–	(Finland) Juuso Nordgren	MON	SWE	MEX	FRA	ARG	POR	ITA	POL	FIN	GER	ESP; 4	GBR; 5	AUS		17th	24	1st	193
2017	Škoda Motorsport	Škoda Fabia R5	–	(Norway) Ole Christian Veiby	MON	SWE	MEX	FRA	ARG	POR	ITA	POL	FIN	GER	ESP	GBR; 16	AUS		6th	58	1st	193
2018	Škoda Motorsport	Škoda Fabia R5	–	(Czech Republic) Jan Kopecký	MON; 1	SWE	MEX	FRA; 1	ARG	POR	ITA; 1	FIN	GER; 1	TUR; 1	GBR	ESP; 2	AUS		1st	143	1st	150
2018	Škoda Motorsport	Škoda Fabia R5	–	(Sweden) Pontus Tidemand	MON	SWE; 2	MEX; 1	FRA	ARG; 1	POR; 1	ITA	FIN	GER	TUR; Ret	GBR; 2	ESP	AUS		2nd	111	1st	150
2018	Škoda Motorsport	Škoda Fabia R5	–	(Finland) Kalle Rovanperä	MON	SWE	MEX; 5	FRA	ARG; Ret	POR	ITA	FIN; 4	GER; 2	TUR	GBR; 1	ESP; 1	AUS		3rd	90	1st	150
2018	Škoda Motorsport	Škoda Fabia R5	–	(Norway) Ole Christian Veiby	MON	SWE; 3	MEX	FRA; 4	ARG	POR	ITA; 2	FIN; Ret	GER	TUR	GBR	ESP	AUS		7th	47	1st	150
2018	Škoda Motorsport	Škoda Fabia R5	–	(Finland) Juuso Nordgren	MON	SWE	MEX	FRA	ARG	POR; 6	ITA	FIN	GER	TUR	GBR	ESP	AUS		33rd	8	1st	150
2019	Škoda Motorsport	Škoda Fabia R5	–	(Finland) Eerik Pietarinen	MON	SWE; Ret	MEX	FRA	ARG	CHL	POR	ITA	FIN; Ret	GER	TUR	GBR	ESP	AUS; C	9th	0	1st	323
2019	Škoda Motorsport	Škoda Fabia R5	–	(Bolivia) Marco Bulacia Wilkinson	MON	SWE	MEX	FRA	ARG; Ret	CHL; 4	POR	ITA	FIN	GER	TUR	GBR	ESP	AUS; C	7th	12	1st	323
2019	Škoda Motorsport	Škoda Fabia R5	–	(Finland) Kalle Rovanperä	MON; 2	SWE; 2	MEX	FRA; Ret	ARG	CHL; 1									1st	176	1st	323
2019	Škoda Motorsport	Skoda Fabia R5 Evo	–	(Finland) Kalle Rovanperä							POR; 1	ITA; 1	FIN; 1	GER; 3	TUR; 3	GBR; 1	ESP; 3	AUS; C	1st	176	1st	323
2019	Škoda Motorsport	Skoda Fabia R5 Evo	–	(Czech Republic) Jan Kopecký	MON	SWE	MEX	FRA	ARG	CHL	POR; 2	ITA; 2	FIN	GER; 1	TUR; 2	GBR; 2	ESP; 2	AUS; C	4th	115	1st	323

* Season still in progress.

== Victories ==
=== PWRC Victories ===
No.	Event	Season	Driver	Co-driver	Car
1	3rd Rally Norway	2009	(Sweden) Patrik Sandell	(Sweden) Emil Axelsson	Škoda Fabia S2000
2	2009 Cyprus Rally	2009	(Sweden) Patrik Sandell	(Sweden) Emil Axelsson	Škoda Fabia S2000
3	(Greece) 2009 Acropolis Rally	2009	(Greece) Lambros Athanassoulas	(Greece) Nikolaos Zakheos	Škoda Fabia S2000

=== SWRC/WRC-2 Victories ===
No.	Event	Season	Driver	Co-driver	Car
1	58th Rally Sweden	2010	(Sweden) Per-Gunnar Andersson	(Sweden) Anders Fredriksson	Škoda Fabia S2000
2	60th Neste Oil Rally Finland	2010	(Finland) Juho Hänninen	(Finland) Mikko Markkula	Škoda Fabia S2000
3	(Germany) 28. ADAC Rallye Deutschland	2010	(Sweden) Patrik Sandell	(Sweden) Emil Axelsson	Škoda Fabia S2000
4	2010 Rallye de France	2010	(Sweden) Patrik Sandell	(Sweden) Emil Axelsson	Škoda Fabia S2000
5	(United Kingdom) 66th Wales Rally GB	2010	(Norway) Andreas Mikkelsen	(Norway) Ola Floene	Škoda Fabia S2000
6	(Greece) 57th Acropolis Rally	2011	(Finland) Juho Hänninen	(Finland) Mikko Markkula	Škoda Fabia S2000
7	61st Neste Oil Rally Finland	2011	(Finland) Juho Hänninen	(Finland) Mikko Markkula	Škoda Fabia S2000
8	(Spain) 47º RACC Rally de España	2011	(Finland) Juho Hänninen	(Finland) Mikko Markkula	Škoda Fabia S2000
9	46º Rally de Portugal	2012	(New Zealand) Hayden Paddon	(New Zealand) John Kennard	Škoda Fabia S2000
10	42nd Rally New Zealand	2012	(New Zealand) Hayden Paddon	(New Zealand) John Kennard	Škoda Fabia S2000
11	(Monaco) 81ème Rallye Automobile Monte-Carlo	2013	(Germany) Sepp Wiegand	(Germany) Frank Christian	Škoda Fabia S2000
12	47. Vodafone Rally de Portugal 2013	2013	(Finland) Esapekka Lappi	(Finland) Janne Ferm	Škoda Fabia S2000
13	72nd Rally Poland 2015	2015	(Finland) Esapekka Lappi	(Finland) Janne Ferm	Škoda Fabia R5
14	65th Rally Finland 2015	2015	(Finland) Esapekka Lappi	(Finland) Janne Ferm	Škoda Fabia R5
15	(Germany) 33. Rallye Deutschland 2015	2015	(Czech Republic) Jan Kopecký	(Czech Republic) Pavel Dresler	Škoda Fabia R5
16	(Spain) 51. RallyRACC Catalunya – Costa Daurada	2015	(Sweden) Pontus Tidemand	(Sweden) Emil Axelsson	Škoda Fabia R5
17	(United Kingdom) 71st Wales Rally GB	2015	(Finland) Teemu Suninen	(Finland) Mikko Markkula	Škoda Fabia S2000
18	(Mexico) 30º Rally México 2016	2016	(Finland) Teemu Suninen	(Finland) Mikko Markkula	Škoda Fabia R5
19	36. Rally Argentina	2016	(Peru) Nicolás Fuchs	(Argentina) Fernando Mussano	Škoda Fabia R5
20	50º Rally de Portugal	2016	(Sweden) Pontus Tidemand	(Sweden) Jonas Andersson	Škoda Fabia R5
21	(Italy) 13º Rally d'Italia Sardegna	2016	(Finland) Teemu Suninen	(Finland) Mikko Markkula	Škoda Fabia R5
22	73rd Rally Poland	2016	(Finland) Teemu Suninen	(Finland) Mikko Markkula	Škoda Fabia R5
23	66th Rally Finland 2016	2016	(Finland) Esapekka Lappi	(Finland) Janne Ferm	Škoda Fabia R5
24	(Germany) 34 ADAC Rallye Deutschland 2016	2016	(Finland) Esapekka Lappi	(Finland) Janne Ferm	Škoda Fabia R5
25	(Spain) 52. RallyRACC Catalunya – Costa Daurada 2016	2016	(Czech Republic) Jan Kopecký	(Czech Republic) Pavel Dresler	Škoda Fabia R5
26	(United Kingdom) 72nd Wales Rally GB 2016	2016	(Finland) Esapekka Lappi	(Finland) Janne Ferm	Škoda Fabia R5
27	25th Rally Australia 2016	2016	(Finland) Esapekka Lappi	(Finland) Janne Ferm	Škoda Fabia R5
28	(Monaco) 85ème Rallye Automobile Monte-Carlo	2017	(Norway) Andreas Mikkelsen	(Norway) Anders Jæger	Škoda Fabia R5
29	65th Rally Sweden	2017	(Sweden) Pontus Tidemand	(Sweden) Jonas Andersson	Škoda Fabia R5
30	(Mexico) 31º Rally México 2017	2017	(Sweden) Pontus Tidemand	(Sweden) Jonas Andersson	Škoda Fabia R5
31	(France) 60. Che Guevara Energy Drink Tour de Corse 2017	2017	(Norway) Andreas Mikkelsen	(Norway) Anders Jæger	Škoda Fabia R5
