= Škoda Pick-up =

Škoda Pickup may refer to two different car models produced by Škoda Auto:

- 1st generation - produced from 1992 to 1995, based on the Škoda Favorit
- 2nd generation - produced from 1995 to 2001, based on the Škoda Felicia
