= 1996 Monte Carlo Rally =

63rd Rallye Automobile de Monte-Carlo

1996 Monte Carlo Rally 64ème Rallye Automobile de Monte-Carlo
- Round 1 of the 1996 2-Litre World Championship
- Host country: Monaco
- Dates run: 20 – 25 January 1996
- Stage surface: Asphalt

Statistics
- Crews: 150 at start, 99 at finish

Overall results
- Overall winner: (France) Patrick Bernardini; Ford Escort RS Cosworth; 5:24:40

The 1996 Monte Carlo Rally was the 63rd Rallye Automobile de Monte-Carlo. It was won by Patrick Bernardini.

As it was not part of the 1996 World Rally Championship, it was instead held as the first round of the 2-Litre World Championship.

== Results ==
Pos.	No.	Driver	Car	Time/Retired
1	3	(France) Patrick Bernardini	Ford Escort RS Cosworth	5:24:40
2	1	(France) François Delecour	Peugeot 306 Maxi	5:28:24
3	2	(Germany) Armin Schwarz	Toyota Celica GT-Four	5:31:52
4	4	(France) Bernard Béguin	Subaru Impreza 555	5:33:59
5	11	(France) Pierre-César Baroni	Subaru Impreza 555	5:35:13
6	26	(Netherlands) Iwan Postel	Subaru Impreza 555	5:37:17
7	19	(France) Daniel Ducruet	Lancia Delta HF Integrale	5:41:27
8	15	(Italy) Maurizio Verini	Lancia Delta HF Integrale	5:47:21
9	7	(Russia) Yevgeniy Vasin	Opel Astra GSi	5:48:34
10	8	(Germany) Erwin Weber	SEAT Ibiza GTi	5:49:41
11	25	(France) Jean-Paul Aymé	Mitsubishi Lancer Evo III	5:50:40
12	14	(Czech Republic) Pavel Sibera	Škoda Felicia Kit Car	5:51:25
13	17	(Czech Republic) Emil Triner	Škoda Felicia Kit Car	5:54:58
14	36	(France) Alain Pellerey	Citroën ZX 16V	6:00:09
15	46	(France) Claude Carret	Ford Escort RS Cosworth	6:03:11
16	20	(France) Frédéric Dor	Subaru Impreza 555	6:03:29
17	28	(France) Frédéric Schmit	Ford Escort RS Cosworth	6:05:36
18	42	(France) Renaud Poutot	Subaru Impreza GT Turbo	6:09:17
19	39	(France) Michel Bonfils	Lancia Delta HF Integrale	6:09:22
20	74	(France) Christophe Arnaud	Renault Clio Williams	6:09:29
21	35	(France) Xavier Du Castel	Lancia Delta HF Integrale	6:09:50
22	29	(Italy) Italo Ferrara	Lancia Delta HF Integrale	6:10:13
23	47	(France) Eric Mallen	Mitsubishi Lancer Evo	6:14:22
24	57	(France) Daniel Fores	Renault Clio Williams	6:14:51
25	27	(Monaco) Auguste Turiani	Ford Escort RS Cosworth	6:15:34
26	94	(France) Richard Bourcier	Peugeot 106 XSI	6:17:07
27	41	(Italy) Maurizio Baldi	Ford Escort RS Cosworth	6:21:30
28	48	(Germany) Klaus Günther	Lancia Delta HF Integrale	6:23:14
29	50	(Germany) Horst Rotter	Opel Astra GSi	6:23:29
30	106	(Italy) Nicola Caldani	Fiat Cinquecento Sporting	6:23:35
31	83	(France) Serge Guiramand	Renault Clio Williams	6:24:00
32	79	(France) Roger Grimaud	Honda Civic VTi	6:26:00
33	142	(France) Serge Beschi	Renault Clio Williams	6:29:29
34	82	(France) Jean-Marc Masse	Citroën AX GTi	6:31:18
35	62	(France) Jean-Pierre Landron	Ford Escort RS Cosworth	6:33:07
36	129	(Italy) Andrea Maselli	Fiat Cinquecento Sporting	6:34:43
37	134	(France) Pascal Berard	Renault Clio Williams	6:34:53
38	121	(Poland) Jacek Sikora	Fiat Cinquecento Sporting	6:35:03
39	146	(France) Thierry Savey	Renault Clio Williams	6:35:41
40	115	(Austria) Herbert Kowald	Fiat Cinquecento Sporting	6:35:59
41	156	(France) Thierry Dard	Peugeot 205 GTi	6:37:05
42	141	(France) Jean-Claude Pelletier	Renault Clio Williams	6:40:11
43	145	(Germany) Rudolf Kuchlmaier	Peugeot 205 GTi	6:42:12
44	126	(Germany) Siegfried Steinacker	Fiat Cinquecento Sporting	6:42:27
45	92	(France) Philippe Vanhaesebrouck	Peugeot 205 Rallye	6:42:32
46	78	(Germany) Peter Bosse	Opel Kadett GSi	6:42:35
47	109	(France) Sébastien Currat	Fiat Cinquecento Sporting	6:42:37
48	128	(France) René Chevalier	Renault Clio Williams	6:43:39
49	80	(France) Guy Loison	Honda Civic VTi	6:44:23
50	40	(Italy) Marco Gramenzi	Lancia Delta HF Integrale	6:44:38
51	139	(France) David Truphemus	Peugeot 205 GTi	6:47:32
52	142	(Germany) Udo Naab	Opel Kadett GTi	6:48:10
53	154	(Belgium) Johan Bastiaens	Honda Civic VTi	6:49:20
54	88	(Italy) Emilio Corio	Fiat Coupé 2.0	6:49:58
55	118	(Spain) Jorge Martínez Cueto	Fiat Cinquecento Sporting	6:50:04
56	112	(Denmark) Torben Fasterholdt	Fiat Cinquecento Sporting	6:51:26
57	71	(France) La Houl	Lancia Delta HF Integrale	6:5?:??
58	158	(France) Jean-François Forot	Honda Civic	6:5?:??
59	151	(Italy) Mauro Simoncini	Daewoo Nexia	6:5?:??
60	137	(Denmark) Lars Pihl	Peugeot 307 GTi	6:56:35
61	103	(Spain) Ana Arche	Fiat Cinquecento Sporting	7:00:34
62	132	(Italy) Roberta Rossi	Fiat Cinquecento Sporting	7:0?:??
63	101	(Denmark) Poul Weinreich	Peugeot 106 XSi	7:01:31
64	131	(France) Gilles Giraud	Peugeot 309 GTi	?:??:??
65	108	(France) Joël Benivay	Renault Clio Williams	?:??:??
66	117	(Germany) Florian Schmidt	Suzuki Swift	?:??:??
67	143	(France) Jean-Claude Forel	Renault Clio Williams	?:??:??
68	163	(France) Eddy Brisson	Peugeot 205 Rallye	?:??:??
69	113	(United Kingdom) Tony Dron	Mini Cooper	?:??:??
70	159	(France) Christian Guillot	Peugeot 205 GTI	?:??:??
71	138	(France) Paul Saly	Renault Clio Williams	?:??:??
72	155	(France) Jean-Louis Boubal	Peugeot 205 GTi	?:??:??
73	73	(France) Michel Andrey	Peugeot 205 Rallye	?:??:??
74	70	(France) "Loic"	Lancia Delta Integrale	?:??:??
75	110	(Germany) Markus Bühl	Suzuki Swift	?:??:??
76	160	(France) Jacques Molbert	Peugeot 205 GTi	?:??:??
77	104	(France) Christian Bressan	Peugeot 205 GTi	?:??:??
78	56	(Germany) Klaus Teichmann	Nissan Sunny	?:??:??
79	161	(France) Marcel Laissus	Peugeot 106 Rallye	?:??:??
80	99	(France) Pierre-Yves Salessy	Peugeot 106 XSi	?:??:??
81	148	(Germany) Bernd Nebelin	Opel Kadett	?:??:??
82	149	(France) Philippe Raillon	Peugeot 309 GTi	?:??:??
83	100	(Italy) Gabriele Cadringher	Fiat Cinquecento Sporting	?:??:??
84	123	(Norway) Oddvar Moy	Opel Astra	?:??:??
85	111	(United Kingdom) Keith Bird	Mini Cooper	?:??:??
86	65	(France) Jacques Verot	Ford Escort RS Cosworth	?:??:??
87	102	(France) G. Risson	Peugeot 106 XSi	?:??:??
88	105	(France) Y. Baugiraud	Lada Samara	?:??:??
87	168	(France) Bernard Jaussaud	Renault Clio Williams	?:??:??
90	127	(France) Thierry Chkondali	Renault Clio Williams	?:??:??
91	136	(France) Jacques Richaud	Peugeot 306 S16	?:??:??
92	98	(France) Robert Le Cozanet	Peugeot 205 GTi	?:??:??
93	140	(France) Jacky Leroy	Renault Clio Williams	?:??:??
94	67	(Monaco) Marc Dessi	Peugeot 205 GTi	?:??:??
95	153	(France) Bruno Zonta	Peugeot 309 GTi	?:??:??
96	9	(Germany) Hermann Gassner	Mitsubishi Lancer Evo III	?:??:??
97	119	(Germany) Wolfgang Schröder	Suzuki Swift	?:??:??
98	152	(Norway) Bjarte Vevle	Volkswagen Golf GTi	?:??:??
99	133	(France) R. M. Fressynet	Renault Clio Williams	?:??:??
Ret	5	(France) François Chatriot	Peugeot 306 Maxi	Clutch
Ret	6	(Spain) Jesús Puras	SEAT Ibiza GTi	Engine
Ret	10	(Italy) Gilberto Piannezola	Toyota Celica GT-Four	Transmission
Ret	12	(Belgium) Grégoire de Mévius	Ford Escort RS Cosworth	Accident
Ret	16	(Italy) Michele Gregis	Lancia Delta HF Integrale	Retired
Ret	18	(Switzerland) Christian Jaquillard	Ford Escort RS Cosworth	Mechanical
Ret	21	(France) Franck Phillips	Lancia Delta HF Integrale	Retired
Ret	23	(Germany) Nikolai Burkart	Nissan Sunny GTi	Clutch
Ret	32	(France) Richard Frau	Ford Escort RS Cosworth	Retired
Ret	33	(France) Jacques Arzeno	Nissan Sunny	Retired
Ret	37	(France) Eddie Mercier	Renault Clio Williams	Retired
Ret	38	(France) Philippe Rubiolo	Peugeot 106 XSi	Retired
Ret	43	(France) René-Philippe Thuillier	Subaru Impreza	Retired
Ret	44	(Germany) Michael Stoschek	Mitsubishi Lancer Evolution III	Retired
Ret	51	(France) F. Troullier	Lancia Delta HF Integrale	Retired
Ret	52	(France) Lecaillon	Renault Clio Williams	Retired
Ret	53	(United Kingdom) Nigel Heath	Ford Escort RS Cosworth	Retired
Ret	54	(Slovenia) Jani Trček	Ford Escort RS Cosworth	Retired
Ret	55	(France) Jean-Louis Sauzon	Volkswagen Golf GTi	Retired
Ret	58	(Italy) Nicola Sardelli	Ford Escort RS Cosworth	Retired
Ret	59	(Switzerland) Cyril Henny	Mazda 323 GT-R	Gearbox
Ret	61	(France) Consani	Ford Escort RS Cosworth	Retired
Ret	63	(Italy) Robert Nosenzo	Ford Escort RS Cosworth	Retired
Ret	66	(France) Nicolas Ressegaire	Lancia Delta HF Integrale	Retired
Ret	77	(United Kingdom) Robert Plant	Mini Cooper	Retired
Ret	81	(France) René Caminada	Volkswagen Golf GTi	Mechanical
Ret	90	(Germany) Andreas Praschma	Opel Astra	Retired
Ret	91	(France) Jacques Fillet	Peugeot 309 GTi	Retired
Ret	95	(France) Julien Quinonero	Peugeot 306 S16	Retired
Ret	97	(Greece) Kostas Argiriou	Fiat Cinquecento Sporting	Mechanical
Ret	107	(France) Jacky Cesbron	Renault Clio 1.2	Retired
Ret	114	(Germany) Kurt Kreutz	Toyota Starlet	Retired
Ret	116	(Finland) Raimo Näsänen	Opel Corsa	Retired
Ret	122	(France) Michel Billion-Rey	Renault Clio Williams	Retired
Ret	124	(Netherlands) Marcel van Vliet	Fiat Cinquecento Sporting	Retired
Ret	135	(France) Cédric Robert	Fiat Cinquecento Sporting	Retired
Ret	162	(France) Cyrille Oddoux	Peugeot 205 Rallye	Retired
