= Emil Triner =

Czech rally driver (born 1961)

Personal information
- Nationality: (Czech Republic) Czech
- Born: 15 March 1961 (age 65); Toužim, Czechoslovakia

World Rally Championship record
- Years active: 1993-1997, 1999
- Co-driver: (Czech Republic) Jiří Klíma (Czech Republic) Pavel Štanc (Czech Republic) Julius Gál (Czech Republic) Karel Jirátko (Czech Republic) Miloš Hůlka
- Teams: Škoda Motorsport
- Rallies: 32
- Championships: 0
- Rally wins: 0
- Podiums: 0
- Stage wins: 0
- Total points: 2
- First rally: 1993 Rallye Monte Carlo
- Last rally: 1999 Rallye Sanremo

Emil Triner (born 15 March 1961) is a Czech retired professional rally driver. He drove for Škoda Motorsport in the World Rally Championship in 1993-1997 and 1999.

== Complete WRC results ==
Year	Entrant	Car	1	2	3	4	5	6	7	8	9	10	11	12	13	14	WDC	Points
1993	Škoda Motorsport	Škoda Favorit 136L	MON; 23	SWE; 18	POR; Ret	KEN	FRA	GRE; 11	ARG	NZL	FIN; 25	AUS	ITA; 11	ESP; 13	GBR; 15		-	0
1994	Škoda Motorsport	Škoda Favorit 136L	MON	POR; 12	KEN	FRA	GRE; 9	ARG	NZL	FIN; 19	ITA; 18	GBR; 22					45th	2
1995	Škoda Motorsport	Škoda Felicia Kit Car	MON	SWE; 23	POR; Ret	FRA; Ret	NZL	AUS	ESP	GBR							-	0
1996	Škoda Motorsport	Škoda Felicia Kit Car	SWE	KEN	IDN	GRC	ARG; 16	FIN	AUS; 18	ITA	ESP; 23						-	0
1997	Škoda Motorsport	Škoda Felicia Kit Car	MON; 11	SWE; 22	KEN	POR; Ret	ESP; Ret	FRA	ARG; Ret	GRC; 18	NZL	FIN; 25	IDN		AUS; Ret	GBR	-	0
1997	Škoda Motorsport	Škoda Octavia Kit Car												ITA; Ret			-	0
1999	Škoda Motorsport	Škoda Octavia WRC	MON	SWE	KEN	POR; Ret	ESP	FRA	ARG	GRE; 13	NZL	FIN; 14	CHN	ITA; 23	AUS	GBR	-	0

== 2L-MC results ==
Year	Entrant	Car	1	2	3	4	5	6	7	8	9	10	11	12	13	14
1993	(Czech Republic) Škoda Motorsport	Škoda Favorit 136L	MON; 6	SWE; 4	POR; Ret	KEN	FRA	GRC; 1	ARG	NZL	FIN; 3	AUS	ITA; 4	ESP; 6	GBR; 2	
1994	(Czech Republic) Škoda Motorsport	Škoda Favorit 136L	SWE; 7	POR; 3	GRC; 1	FIN; 4	AUS; Ret	ITA; 4	ESP; 5	GBR; 7						
1995	(Czech Republic) Škoda Motorsport	Škoda Favorit 136L	MON	SWE; 5	POR; Ret	KEN	FRA; Ret	GRC; Ret	ARG; 3	NZL	FIN; 5	ITA; 4				
1996	(Czech Republic) Škoda Motorsport	Škoda Felicia Kit Car	MON; 5	POR; 6	FRA	ARG; 3	NZL; 1	AUS; 3	ESP; 9	GBR; Ret						
1997	(Czech Republic) Škoda Motorsport	Škoda Felicia Kit Car	MON; 1	SWE; 5	KEN	POR; Ret	ESP; Ret	FRA	ARG; Ret	GRC; 4	NZL	FIN; 7	IDN		AUS; Ret	GBR
1997	(Czech Republic) Škoda Motorsport	Škoda Octavia Kit Car												ITA; Ret		

=== IRC results ===
Year	Entrant	Car	1	2	3	4	5	6	7	8	9	10	11	12	13	WDC	Points
2012	(Czech Republic) Surfin	Škoda Fabia S2000	AZO	CAN	IRL	COR	ITA	YPR	SMR	ROM	ZLI; 20	YAL	SLI	SAN	CYP	-	0
