= Škoda Fabia WRC =

Škoda World Rally Car

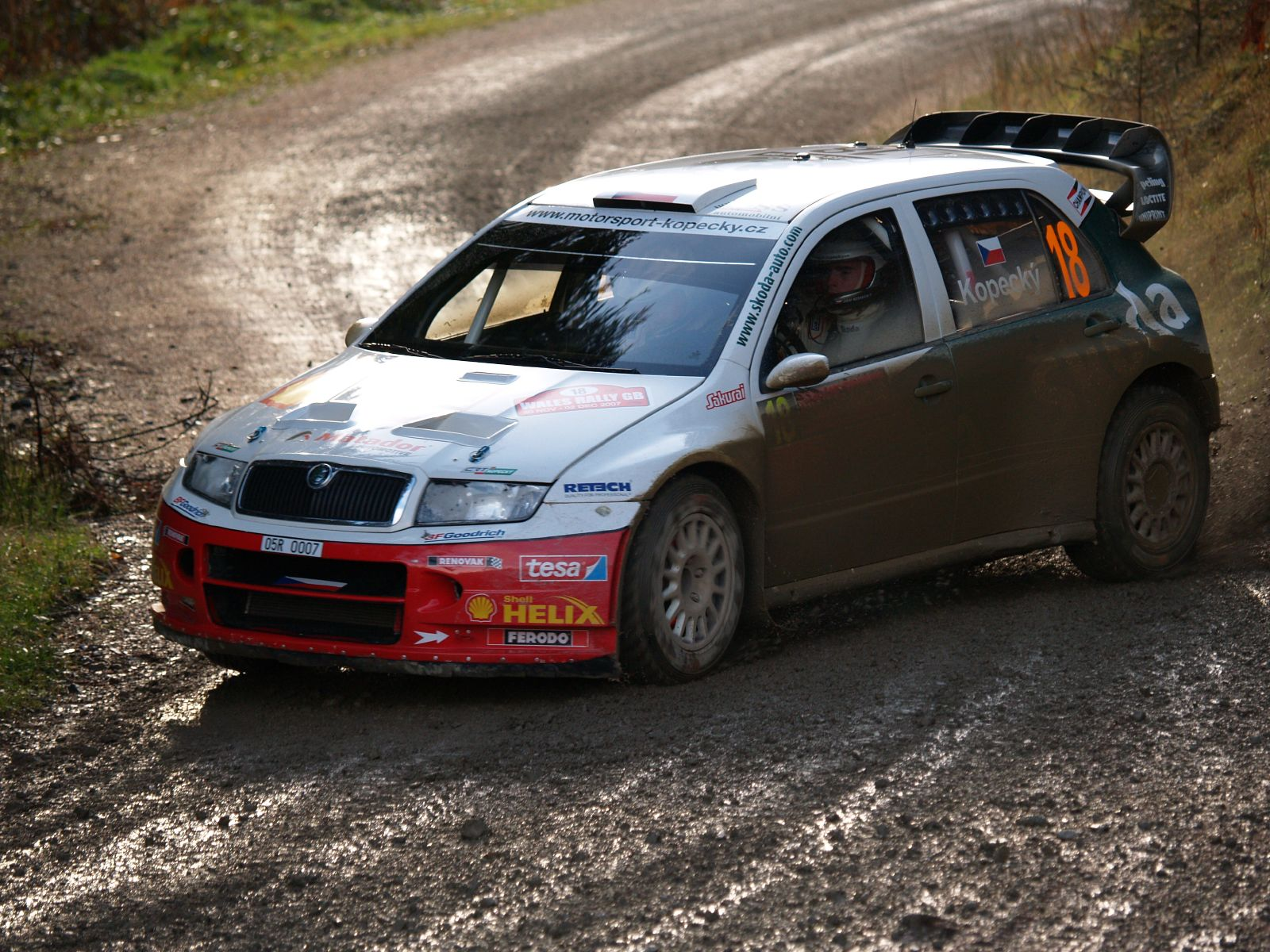
- Category: World Rally Car
- Constructor: Škoda Motorsport
- Predecessor: Škoda Octavia WRC

Technical specifications
- Length: 4,002 mm (157.6 in)
- Width: 1,770 mm (69.7 in)
- Height: 1,429 mm (56.3 in)
- Wheelbase: 2,462 mm (96.9 in)
- Engine: 1,984 cc (121.1 cu in) I4 turbocharged Front transverse
- Transmission: Six-speed sequential 4-wheel drive
- Weight: 1,230 kg (2,711.7 lb)
- Tyres: Michelin

Competition history (WRC)
- Notable entrants: (Czech Republic) Škoda Motorsport
- Notable drivers: (France) Didier Auriol; (France) Alexandre Bengué; (Sweden) Kenneth Eriksson; (Finland) Toni Gardemeister; (Finland) Mikko Hirvonen; (Czech Republic) Jan Kopecký; (Czech Republic) Roman Kresta; (Scotland) Colin McRae; (Finland) Jani Paasonen; (Germany) Armin Schwarz; (Finland) Janne Tuohino
- Debut: (Germany) 2003 Rally Deutschland
Races	Wins	Podiums	Titles
57	0	0	0

The Škoda Fabia WRC is a World Rally Car built for the Škoda Motorsport by Škoda Auto in the World Rally Championship. It is based upon the Škoda Fabia road car, and was debuted at the 2003 Rally Deutschland. The R5 version was launched in 2015.

== Competition history ==
The car was introduced at the 2003 Rally Deutschland, replacing the Octavia WRC. However, the car did not score any point in the season, which led the 2004 season to a development year. The car won twelve stages in its fifty-seven contested WRC events, but failed to achieve any podium.

== Gallery ==
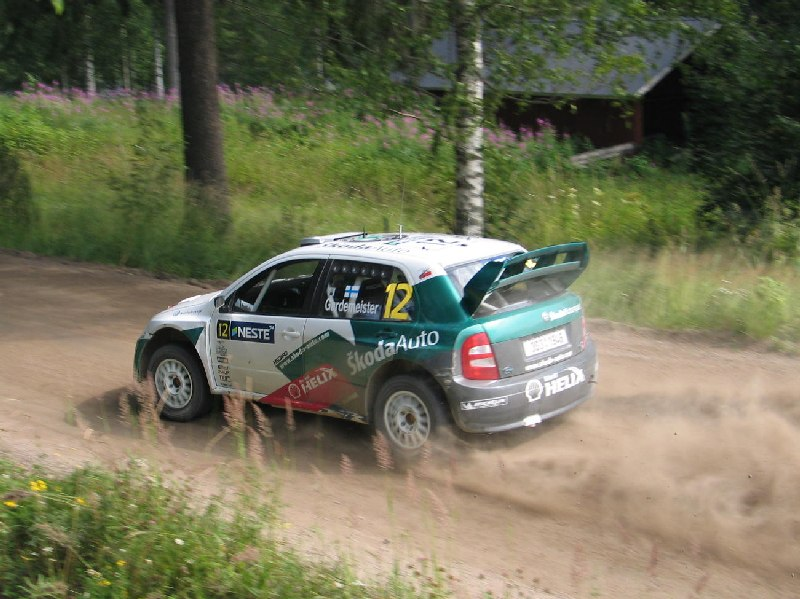

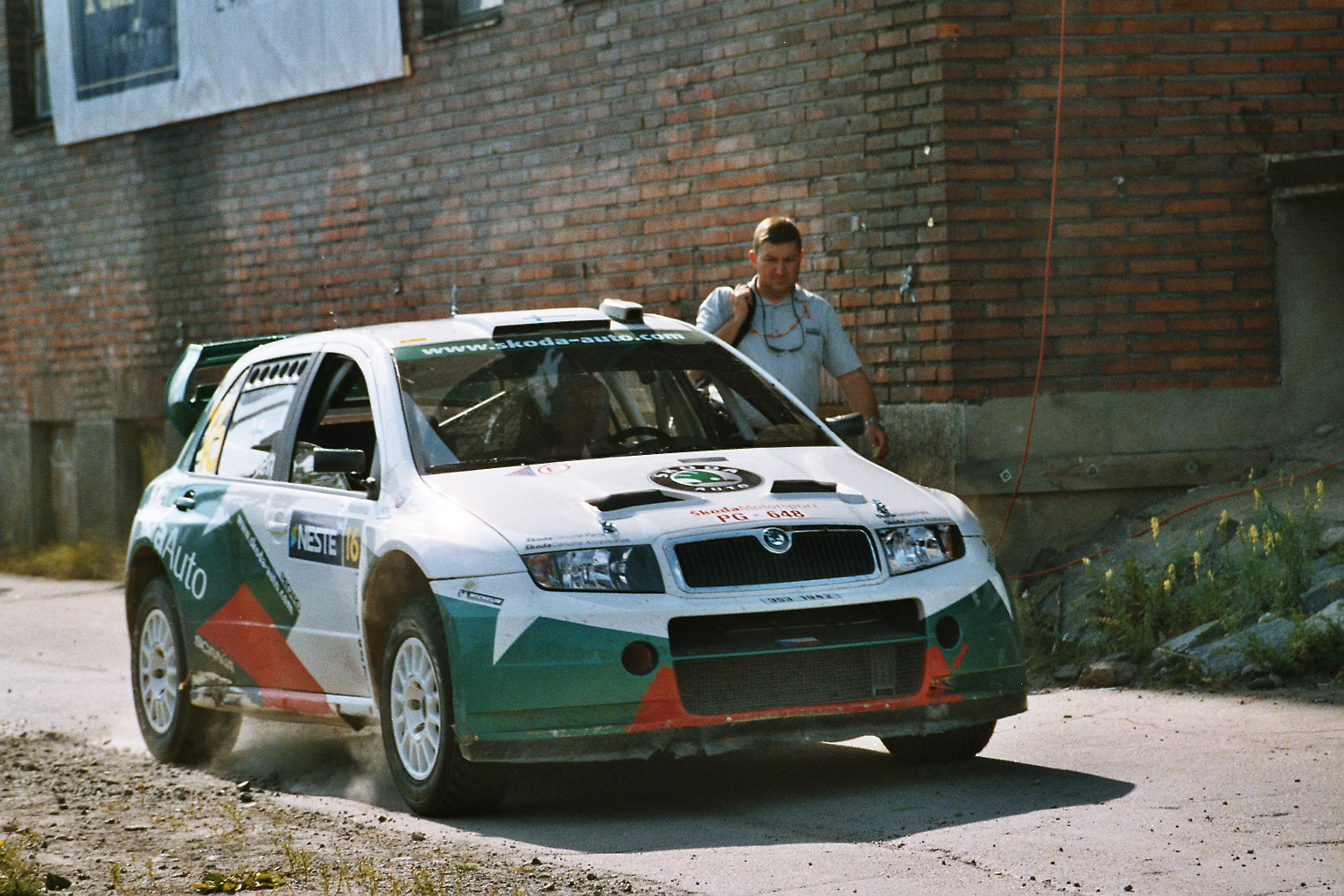

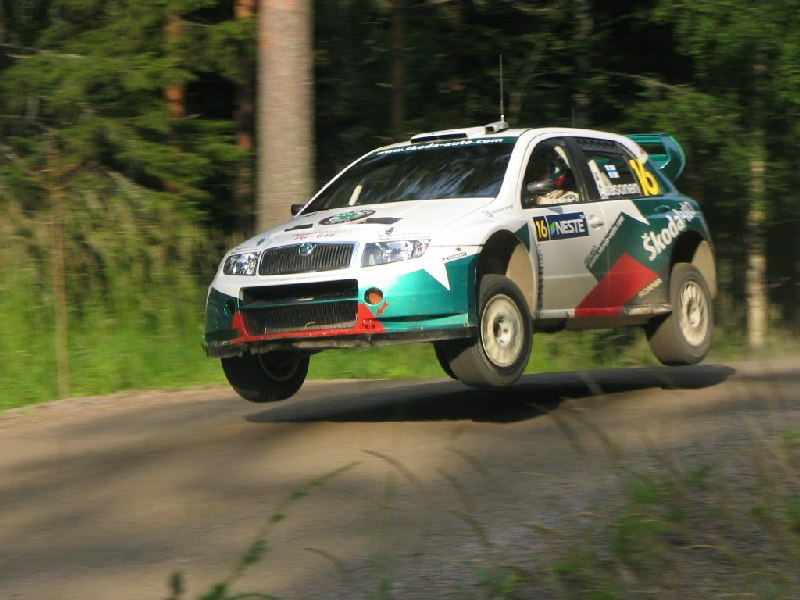

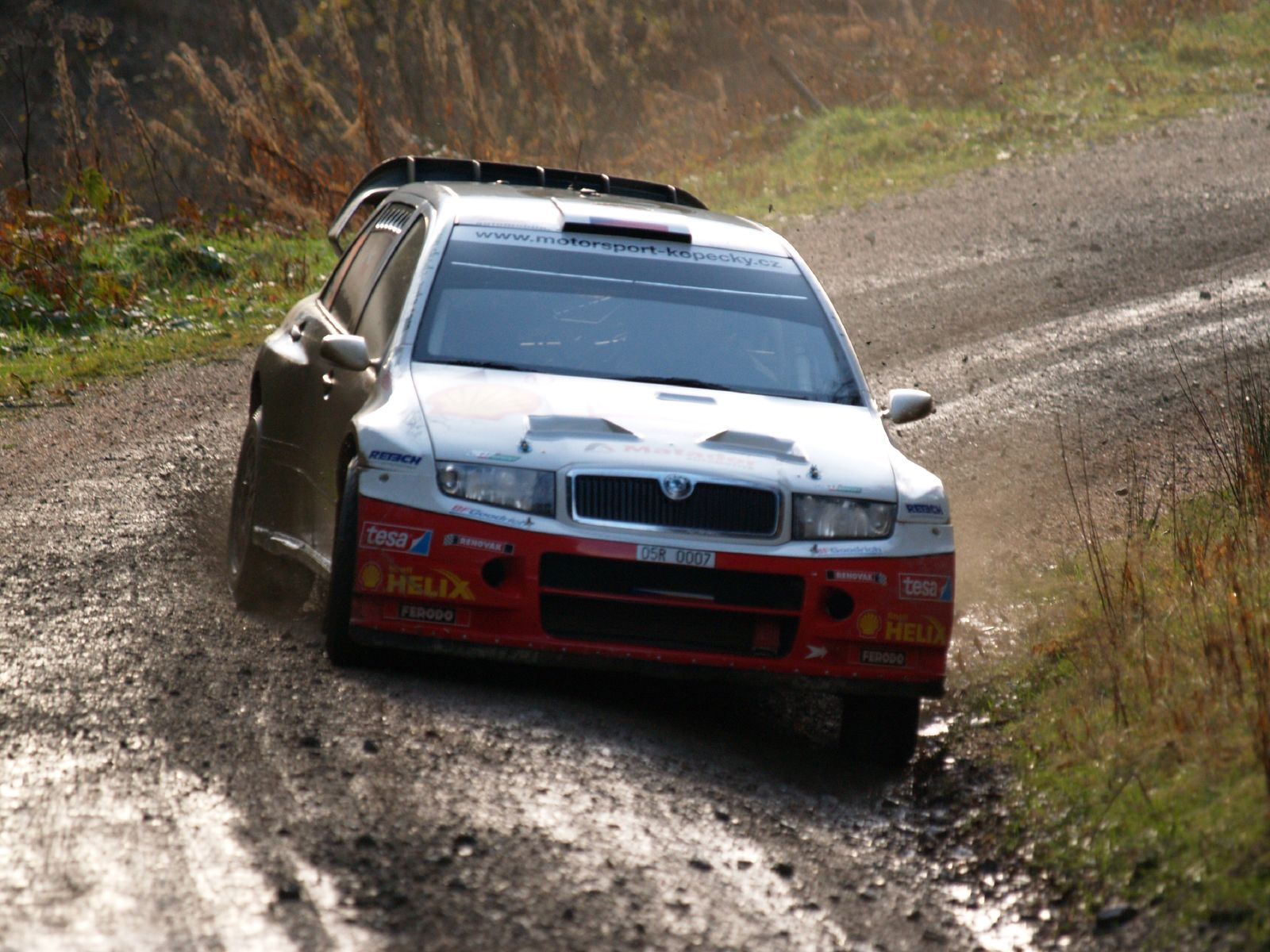
