= Škoda Octavia WRC =

Škoda World Rally Car

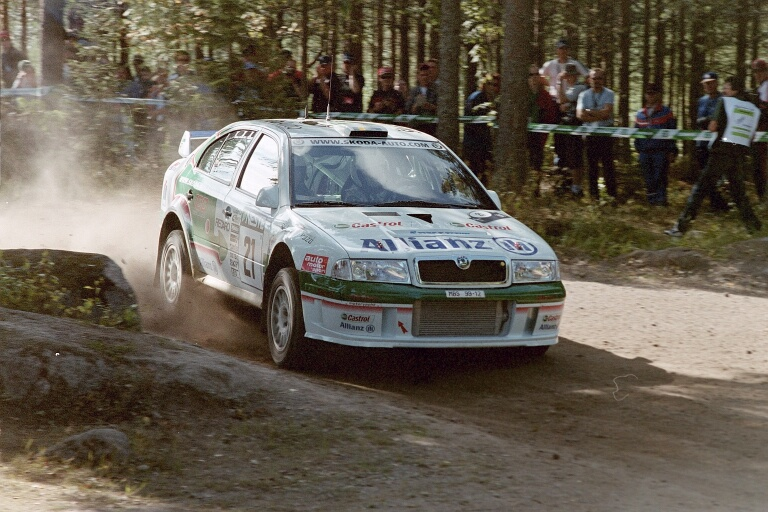
- Stig Blomqvist driving a Octavia WRC at the 2001 Rally Finland.
- Category: World Rally Car
- Constructor: Škoda Motorsport
- Successor: Škoda Fabia WRC

Technical specifications
- Length: 4,511 mm (177.6 in)
- Width: 1,770 mm (69.7 in)
- Height: 1,429 mm (56.3 in)
- Axle track: 1,585 mm (62.4 in)
- Wheelbase: 2,512 mm (98.9 in)
- Engine: 1,984 cc (121.1 cu in) I4 longitudinal turbo charge Front transverse
- Transmission: Six-speed sequential 4-wheel drive
- Weight: 1,230 kg (2,711.7 lb)
- Tyres: Michelin

Competition history (WRC)
- Notable entrants: (Czech Republic) Škoda Motorsport
- Notable drivers: (France) Didier Auriol; (Sweden) Stig Blomqvist; (Spain) Luís Climent; (Sweden) Kenneth Eriksson; (Finland) Toni Gardemeister; (Germany) Matthias Kahle; (Czech Republic) Jan Kopecký; (Czech Republic) Roman Kresta; (Argentina) Gabriel Pozzo; (Germany) Armin Schwarz; (Czech Republic) Pavel Sibera; (Belgium) Bruno Thiry; (Czech Republic) Emil Triner
- Debut: (Monaco) 1999 Monte Carlo Rally
Races	Wins	Podiums	Titles
49	0	1	0

The Škoda Octavia WRC is a World Rally Car built for the Škoda Motorsport by Škoda Auto in the World Rally Championship. It is based upon the Škoda Octavia road car, and was debuted at the 1999 Monte Carlo Rally.

== Competition history ==
The car's initial version debuted at the 1999 Monte Carlo Rally, with two evolutionary versions were launched in 2001 and 2003 respectively. In its four years service in the Škoda works team, the car achieved two stage wins and a podium finish at the 2001 Safari Rally. The car was replaced by Škoda Fabia WRC in middle of the 2003 season.

== Gallery ==
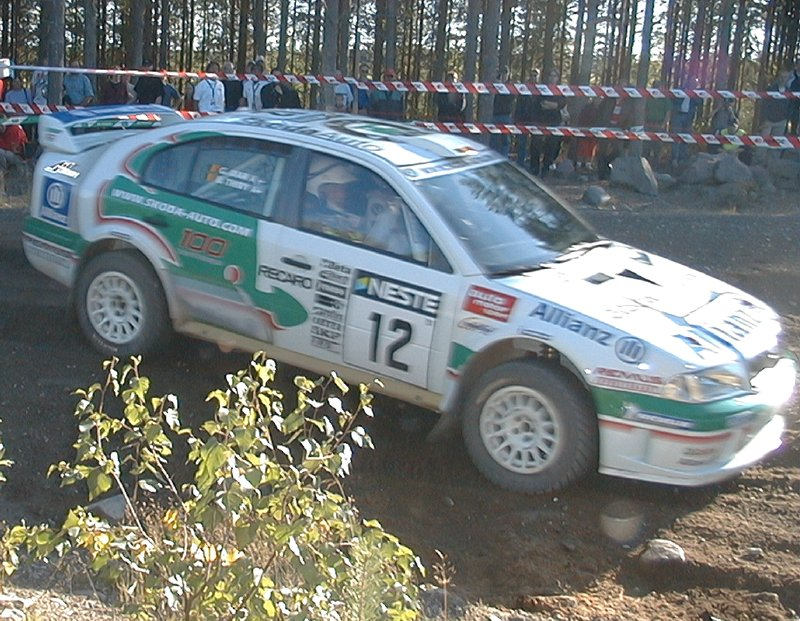

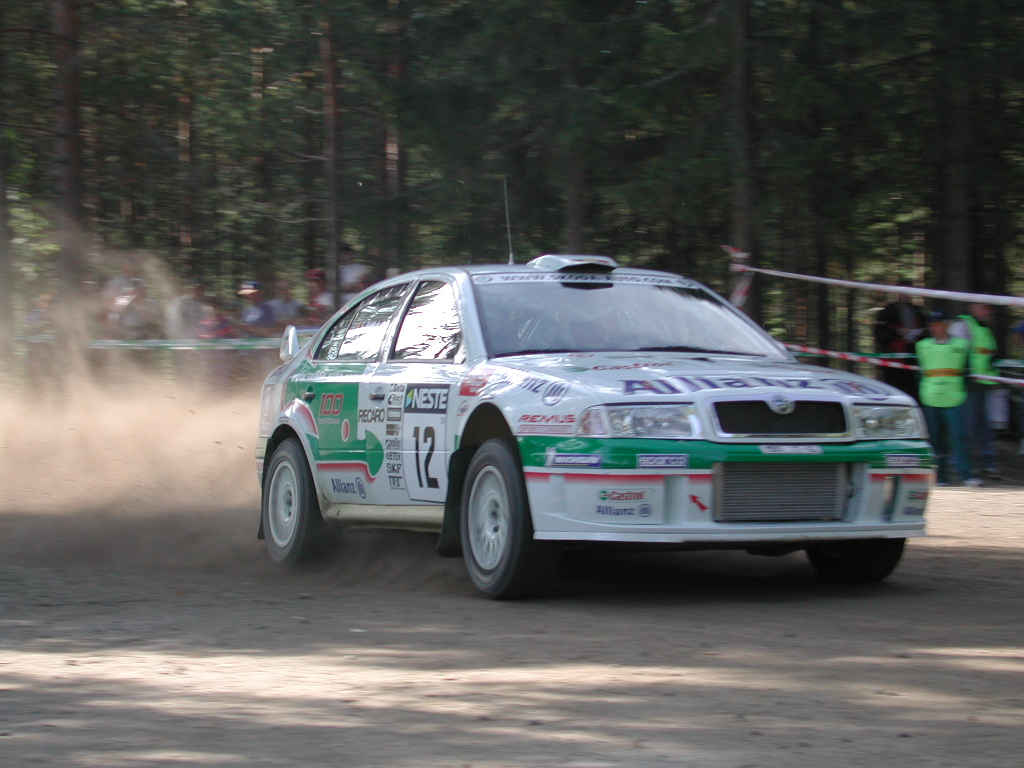

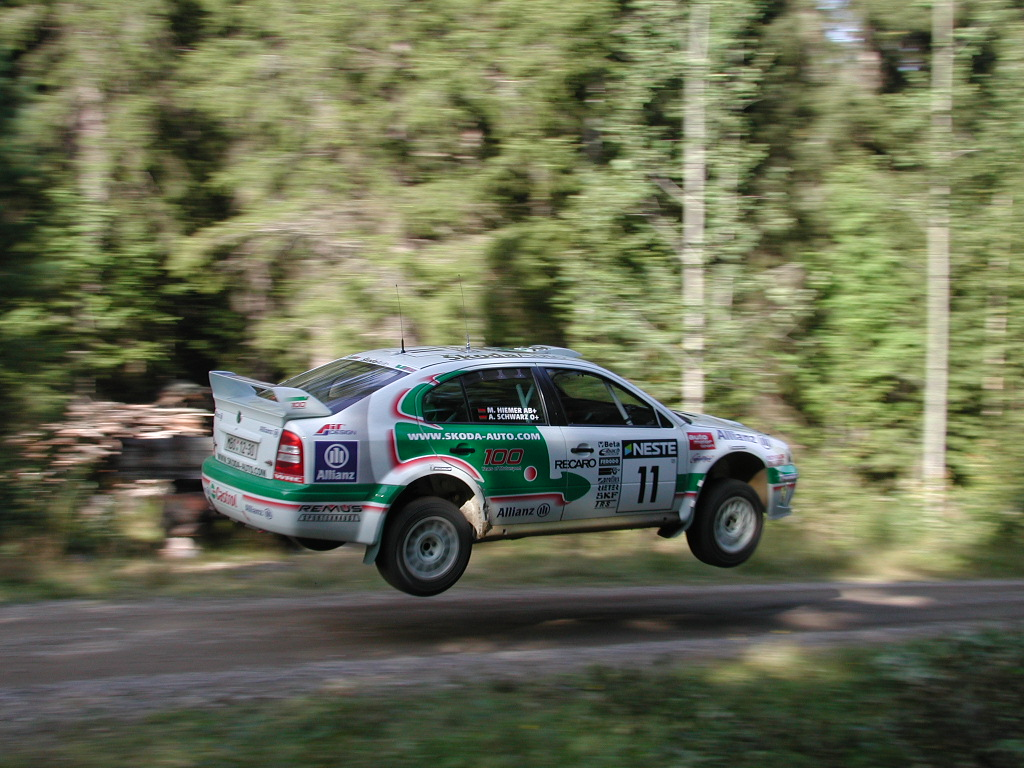
