= 2001 Safari Rally =

8th edition of Kenyan automobile rally

2001 Safari Rally 49th Safari Rally Kenya
Round 8 of the 2001 World Rally Championship season
| ← Previous event | Next event → |
- Host country: Kenya
- Rally base: Nairobi
- Dates run: July 20, 2001 – July 22, 2001
- Stages: 13 (1,129.76 km; 702.00 miles)
- Stage surface: Gravel
- Overall distance: 2,908.51 km (1,807.26 miles)

Statistics
- Crews: 41 at start, 15 at finish

Overall results
- Overall winner: (Finland) Tommi Mäkinen (Finland) Risto Mannisenmäki (Japan) Marlboro Mitsubishi Ralliart; Mitsubishi Lancer Evo 6.5

The 2001 Safari Rally (formally the 49th Safari Rally Kenya) was the eighth round of the 2001 World Rally Championship. The race was held over three days between 20 July and 22 July 2001, and was won by Mitsubishi's Tommi Mäkinen, his 23rd win in the World Rally Championship.

== Background ==
=== Entry list ===
| No. | Driver | Co-Driver | Entrant | Car | Tyre |
|---|---|---|---|---|---|
World Rally Championship manufacturer entries
| 1 | (Finland) Marcus Grönholm | (Finland) Timo Rautiainen | (France) Peugeot Total | Peugeot 206 WRC | MI |
| 3 | (Spain) Carlos Sainz | (Spain) Luis Moya | (United Kingdom) Ford Motor Co. Ltd. | Ford Focus RS WRC '01 | P |
| 4 | (United Kingdom) Colin McRae | (United Kingdom) Nicky Grist | (United Kingdom) Ford Motor Co. Ltd. | Ford Focus RS WRC '01 | P |
| 5 | (United Kingdom) Richard Burns | (United Kingdom) Robert Reid | (Japan) Subaru World Rally Team | Subaru Impreza S7 WRC '01 | P |
| 6 | (Norway) Petter Solberg | (United Kingdom) Phil Mills | (Japan) Subaru World Rally Team | Subaru Impreza S7 WRC '01 | P |
| 7 | (Finland) Tommi Mäkinen | (Finland) Risto Mannisenmäki | (Japan) Marlboro Mitsubishi Ralliart | Mitsubishi Lancer Evo 6.5 | MI |
| 8 | (Belgium) Freddy Loix | (Belgium) Sven Smeets | (Japan) Marlboro Mitsubishi Ralliart | Mitsubishi Carisma GT Evo VI | MI |
| 11 | (Germany) Armin Schwarz | (Germany) Manfred Hiemer | (Czech Republic) Škoda Motorsport | Škoda Octavia WRC Evo2 | MI |
| 12 | (Belgium) Bruno Thiry | (Belgium) Stéphane Prévot | (Czech Republic) Škoda Motorsport | Škoda Octavia WRC Evo2 | MI |
| 16 | (Finland) Harri Rovanperä | (Finland) Risto Pietiläinen | (France) Peugeot Total | Peugeot 206 WRC | MI |
World Rally Championship entries
| 2 | (France) Didier Auriol | (France) Denis Giraudet | (France) Peugeot Total | Peugeot 206 WRC | MI |
| 17 | (France) François Delecour | (France) Daniel Grataloup | (United Kingdom) Ford Motor Co. Ltd. | Ford Focus RS WRC '01 | P |
| 19 | (Japan) Toshihiro Arai | (Australia) Glenn Macneall | (Japan) Subaru World Rally Team | Subaru Impreza S7 WRC '01 | P |
| 20 | (France) Frédéric Dor | (France) Didier Breton | (France) F. Dor Rally Team | Subaru Impreza S7 WRC '01 | —N/a |
| 21 | (Czech Republic) Roman Kresta | (Czech Republic) Jan Tománek | (Czech Republic) Škoda Motorsport | Škoda Octavia WRC | MI |
| 25 | (United Kingdom) Alastair Cavenagh | (Kenya) Piers Daykin | (United Kingdom) Alastair Cavenagh | Subaru Impreza 555 | —N/a |
| 26 | (Kenya) Rory Green | (Kenya) Orson Taylor | (Kenya) Rory Green | Subaru Impreza 555 | —N/a |
| 27 | (Kenya) Paul Bailey | (Kenya) Raju Sehmi | (Kenya) Paul Bailey | Toyota Celica GT-Four | —N/a |
| 28 | (Kenya) Rob Hellier | (United Kingdom) Des Page-Morris | (Kenya) Rob Hellier | Mitsubishi Lancer Evo | —N/a |
| 29 | (United Kingdom) John Lloyd | (United Kingdom) Adrian Cavenagh | (United Kingdom) John Lloyd | Mitsubishi Lancer Evo IV | —N/a |
| 34 | (Kenya) Lee Rose | (Kenya) Toby Wright | (Kenya) Lee Rose | Subaru Impreza | —N/a |
| 35 | (Kenya) Fazal Butt | (Kenya) Hitesh Chouhan | (Kenya) Fazal Butt | Subaru Impreza | —N/a |
| 36 | (Kenya) Michelle van Tongeren | (Kenya) Safina Hussein | (Kenya) Michelle van Tongeren | Subaru Impreza | —N/a |
| 45 | (Italy) Stefano Rocca | (Kenya) Peter Stone | (Italy) Stefano Rocca | Subaru Impreza | —N/a |
Group N Cup entries
| 22 | (Argentina) Gabriel Pozzo | (Argentina) Daniel Stillo | (Argentina) Gabriel Pozzo | Mitsubishi Lancer Evo VI | P |
| 23 | (Sweden) Stig Blomqvist | (Venezuela) Ana Goñi | (United Kingdom) David Sutton Cars Ltd | Mitsubishi Lancer Evo VI | —N/a |
| 24 | (Argentina) Marcos Ligato | (Argentina) Rubén García | (Argentina) Marcos Ligato | Mitsubishi Lancer Evo VI | —N/a |
| 30 | (Finland) Jari Latvala | (Finland) Kari Mustalahti | (Finland) Jari Latvala | Mitsubishi Lancer Evo VI | —N/a |
| 31 | (Kenya) Azar Anwar | (Kenya) Tom Muriuki | (Kenya) Azar Anwar | Mitsubishi Lancer Evo | —N/a |
| 32 | (Kenya) Phineas Kimathi | (Kenya) Abdul Sidi | (Kenya) Phineas Kimathi | Subaru Impreza | —N/a |
| 33 | (Austria) Rudolf Stohl | (Austria) Peter Müller | (Austria) Rudolf Stohl | Mitsubishi Lancer Evo VI | —N/a |
| 37 | (Kenya) Jamil Khan | (Kenya) Bill Kirk | (Kenya) Jamil Khan | Subaru Impreza | —N/a |
| 38 | (Japan) Masayuki Yamada | (Japan) Shunichi Washio | (Japan) Masayuki Yamada | Subaru Impreza | —N/a |
| 39 | (Italy) Stefano Marrini | (Italy) Tiziana Sandroni | (Italy) Stefano Marrini | Mitsubishi Lancer Evo VI | —N/a |
| 41 | (Kenya) Musa Locho | (Kenya) Carol Wahome | (Kenya) Musa Locho | Subaru Impreza WRX | —N/a |
| 42 | (Kenya) Don Smith | (Kenya) Adrian Wroe | (Kenya) Don Smith | Subaru Impreza | —N/a |
| 43 | (Kenya) John Ngunjiri | (Kenya) Thuita Karanja | (Kenya) John Ngunjiri | Subaru Impreza | —N/a |
| 44 | (Kenya) Fredrik Kayser | (Kenya) Teeku Patel | (Kenya) Fredrik Kayser | Subaru Impreza | —N/a |
| 49 | (Kenya) Diamond Lalani | (Kenya) Thomas Hansen | (Kenya) Diamond Lalani | Subaru Impreza | —N/a |

=== Itinerary ===
All dates and times are EAT (UTC+3).

| Date | Time | No. | Stage name | Distance |
|---|---|---|---|---|
Leg 1 — 351.76 km
| 20 July | 10:20 | SS1 | Oltepesi 1 | 117.46 km |
| 20 July | 12:28 | SS2 | Kajiado 1 | 49.95 km |
| 20 July | 14:32 | SS3 | Orien 1 | 112.52 km |
| 20 July | 16:41 | SS4 | Maili Tisa 1 | 71.83 km |
Leg 2 — 426.24 km
| 21 July | 07:00 | SS5 | Marigat | 124.48 km |
| 21 July | 09:10 | SS6 | Mbaruk 1 | 84.58 km |
| 21 July | 11:51 | SS7 | Nyaru | 72.37 km |
| 21 July | 14:50 | SS8 | Marigat | 60.23 km |
| 21 July | 16:39 | SS9 | Mbaruk 2 | 84.58 km |
Leg 3 — 351.76 km
| 22 July | 06:40 | SS10 | Oltepesi 2 | 117.46 km |
| 22 July | 08:48 | SS11 | Kajiado 2 | 49.95 km |
| 22 July | 10:47 | SS12 | Orien 2 | 112.52 km |
| 22 July | 12:56 | SS13 | Maili Tisa 2 | 71.83 km |

== Results ==
=== Overall ===
| Pos. | No. | Driver | Co-driver | Team | Car | Time | Difference | Points |
|---|---|---|---|---|---|---|---|---|
| 1 | 7 | (Finland) Tommi Mäkinen | (Finland) Risto Mannisenmäki | (Japan) Marlboro Mitsubishi Ralliart | Mitsubishi Lancer Evo 6.5 | 8:58:37 | | 10 |
| 2 | 16 | (Finland) Harri Rovanperä | (Finland) Risto Pietiläinen | (France) Peugeot Total | Peugeot 206 WRC | 9:11:14 | +12:37 | 6 |
| 3 | 11 | (Germany) Armin Schwarz | (Germany) Manfred Hiemer | (Czech Republic) Škoda Motorsport | Škoda Octavia WRC Evo2 | 9:16:12 | +17:35 | 4 |
| 4 | 17 | (France) François Delecour | (France) Daniel Grataloup | (United Kingdom) Ford Motor Co. Ltd. | Ford Focus RS WRC '01 | 9:19:13 | +20:36 | 3 |
| 5 | 8 | (Belgium) Freddy Loix | (Belgium) Sven Smeets | (Japan) Marlboro Mitsubishi Ralliart | Mitsubishi Carisma GT Evo VI | 10:42:39 | +1:44:02 | 2 |
| 6 | 22 | (Argentina) Gabriel Pozzo | (Argentina) Daniel Stillo | (Argentina) Gabriel Pozzo | Mitsubishi Lancer Evo VI | 11:05:23 | +2:06:46 | 1 |

=== World Rally Cars ===
==== Classification ====
| Position | | No. | Driver | Co-driver | Entrant | Car | Time | Difference | Points |
| Event | Class | No. | Driver | Co-driver | Entrant | Car | Time | Difference | Points |
|---|---|---|---|---|---|---|---|---|---|
| 1 | 1 | 7 | (Finland) Tommi Mäkinen | (Finland) Risto Mannisenmäki | (Japan) Marlboro Mitsubishi Ralliart | Mitsubishi Lancer Evo 6.5 | 8:58:37 | | 10 |
| 2 | 2 | 16 | (Finland) Harri Rovanperä | (Finland) Risto Pietiläinen | (France) Peugeot Total | Peugeot 206 WRC | 9:11:14 | +12:37 | 6 |
| 3 | 3 | 11 | (Germany) Armin Schwarz | (Germany) Manfred Hiemer | (Czech Republic) Škoda Motorsport | Škoda Octavia WRC Evo2 | 9:16:12 | +17:35 | 4 |
| 5 | 4 | 8 | (Belgium) Freddy Loix | (Belgium) Sven Smeets | (Japan) Marlboro Mitsubishi Ralliart | Mitsubishi Carisma GT Evo VI | 10:42:39 | +1:44:02 | 2 |
| Retired SS13 | | 12 | (Belgium) Bruno Thiry | (Belgium) Stéphane Prévot | (Czech Republic) Škoda Motorsport | Škoda Octavia WRC Evo2 | Accident | | 0 |
| Retired SS10 | | 6 | (Norway) Petter Solberg | (United Kingdom) Phil Mills | (Japan) Subaru World Rally Team | Subaru Impreza S7 WRC '01 | Lost wheel | | 0 |
| Retired SS5 | | 3 | (Spain) Carlos Sainz | (Spain) Luis Moya | (United Kingdom) Ford Motor Co. Ltd. | Ford Focus RS WRC '01 | Engine | | 0 |
| Retired SS4 | | 1 | (Finland) Marcus Grönholm | (Finland) Timo Rautiainen | (France) Peugeot Total | Peugeot 206 WRC | Suspension | | 0 |
| Retired SS3 | | 4 | (United Kingdom) Colin McRae | (United Kingdom) Nicky Grist | (United Kingdom) Ford Motor Co. Ltd. | Ford Focus RS WRC '01 | Clutch | | 0 |
| Retired SS1 | | 5 | (United Kingdom) Richard Burns | (United Kingdom) Robert Reid | (Japan) Subaru World Rally Team | Subaru Impreza S7 WRC '01 | Suspension | | 0 |

==== Special stages ====
| Day | Stage | Stage name | Length | Winner | Car | Time | Class leaders |
|---|---|---|---|---|---|---|---|
| Leg 1 (20 Jul) | SS1 | Oltepesi 1 | 117.46 km | (Germany) Armin Schwarz | Škoda Octavia WRC Evo2 | 55:05 | (Germany) Armin Schwarz |
| Leg 1 (20 Jul) | SS2 | Kajiado 1 | 49.95 km | (Finland) Tommi Mäkinen (Belgium) Freddy Loix | Mitsubishi Lancer Evo 6.5; Mitsubishi Carisma GT Evo VI | 24:06 | (Finland) Tommi Mäkinen |
| Leg 1 (20 Jul) | SS3 | Orien 1 | 112.52 km | (Spain) Carlos Sainz | Ford Focus RS WRC '01 | 48:40 | (Finland) Tommi Mäkinen |
| Leg 1 (20 Jul) | SS4 | Maili Tisa 1 | 71.83 km | (Spain) Carlos Sainz | Ford Focus RS WRC '01 | 35:42 | (Finland) Tommi Mäkinen |
| Leg 2 (21 Jul) | SS5 | Marigat | 124.48 km | (Norway) Petter Solberg | Subaru Impreza S7 WRC '01 | 1:00:05 | (Finland) Tommi Mäkinen |
| Leg 2 (21 Jul) | SS6 | Mbaruk 1 | 84.58 km | (Finland) Tommi Mäkinen | Mitsubishi Lancer Evo 6.5 | 46:23 | (Finland) Tommi Mäkinen |
| Leg 2 (21 Jul) | SS7 | Nyaru | 72.37 km | (Norway) Petter Solberg | Subaru Impreza S7 WRC '01 | 41:16 | (Finland) Tommi Mäkinen |
| Leg 2 (21 Jul) | SS8 | Marigat | 60.23 km | (Norway) Petter Solberg | Subaru Impreza S7 WRC '01 | 27:27 | (Finland) Tommi Mäkinen |
| Leg 2 (21 Jul) | SS9 | Mbaruk 2 | 84.58 km | (Finland) Tommi Mäkinen | Mitsubishi Lancer Evo 6.5 | 45:40 | (Finland) Tommi Mäkinen |
| Leg 3 (22 Jul) | SS10 | Oltepesi 2 | 117.46 km | (Finland) Tommi Mäkinen | Mitsubishi Lancer Evo 6.5 | 1:01:02 | (Finland) Tommi Mäkinen |
| Leg 3 (22 Jul) | SS11 | Kajiado 2 | 49.95 km | Stage cancelled | | | (Finland) Tommi Mäkinen |
| Leg 3 (22 Jul) | SS12 | Orien 2 | 112.52 km | (France) François Delecour | Ford Focus RS WRC '01 | 50:09 | (Finland) Tommi Mäkinen |
| Leg 3 (22 Jul) | SS13 | Maili Tisa 2 | 71.83 km | (France) François Delecour | Ford Focus RS WRC '01 | 38:08 | (Finland) Tommi Mäkinen |

==== Championship standings ====
| Pos. | Drivers' championships | | | Co-drivers' championships | | | Manufacturers' championships | | |
| Pos. | Move | Driver | Points | Move | Co-driver | Points | Move | Manufacturer | Points |
|---|---|---|---|---|---|---|---|---|---|
| 1 | 1 | (Finland) Tommi Mäkinen | 40 | 1 | (Finland) Risto Mannisenmäki | 40 | 1 | (Japan) Marlboro Mitsubishi Ralliart | 66 |
| 2 | 1 | (United Kingdom) Colin McRae | 30 | 1 | (United Kingdom) Nicky Grist | 30 | 1 | (United Kingdom) Ford Motor Co. Ltd. | 60 |
| 3 | | (Spain) Carlos Sainz | 26 | | (Spain) Luis Moya | 26 | | (Japan) Subaru World Rally Team | 28 |
| 4 | 1 | (Finland) Harri Rovanperä | 20 | 1 | (Finland) Risto Pietiläinen | 20 | | (France) Peugeot Total | 26 |
| 5 | 1 | (United Kingdom) Richard Burns | 15 | 1 | (United Kingdom) Robert Reid | 15 | | (Czech Republic) Škoda Motorsport | 15 |

=== FIA Cup for Production Rally Drivers ===
==== Classification ====
| Position | | No. | Driver | Co-driver | Entrant | Car | Time | Difference | Points |
| Event | Class | No. | Driver | Co-driver | Entrant | Car | Time | Difference | Points |
|---|---|---|---|---|---|---|---|---|---|
| 6 | 1 | 22 | (Argentina) Gabriel Pozzo | (Argentina) Daniel Stillo | (Argentina) Gabriel Pozzo | Mitsubishi Lancer Evo VI | 11:05:23 | | 10 |
| 7 | 2 | 24 | (Argentina) Marcos Ligato | (Argentina) Rubén García | (Argentina) Marcos Ligato | Mitsubishi Lancer Evo VI | 11:06:47 | +1:24 | 6 |
| 9 | 3 | 31 | (Kenya) Azar Anwar | (Kenya) Tom Muriuki | (Kenya) Azar Anwar | Mitsubishi Lancer Evo | 12:12:30 | +1:07:07 | 4 |
| 10 | 4 | 33 | (Austria) Rudolf Stohl | (Austria) Peter Müller | (Austria) Rudolf Stohl | Mitsubishi Lancer Evo VI | 13:39:40 | +2:34:17 | 3 |
| 11 | 5 | 30 | (Finland) Jari Latvala | (Finland) Kari Mustalahti | (Finland) Jari Latvala | Mitsubishi Lancer Evo VI | 14:04:33 | +2:59:10 | 2 |
| 13 | 6 | 42 | (Kenya) Don Smith | (Kenya) Adrian Wroe | (Kenya) Don Smith | Subaru Impreza | 14:21:56 | +3:16:33 | 1 |
| 14 | 7 | 44 | (Kenya) Fredrik Kayser | (Kenya) Teeku Patel | (Kenya) Fredrik Kayser | Subaru Impreza | 15:47:24 | +4:42:01 | 0 |
| Retired SS8 | | 32 | (Kenya) Phineas Kimathi | (Kenya) Abdul Sidi | (Kenya) Phineas Kimathi | Subaru Impreza | Fuel pump | | 0 |
| Retired SS8 | | 41 | (Kenya) Musa Locho | (Kenya) Carol Wahome | (Kenya) Musa Locho | Subaru Impreza WRX | Electrical | | 0 |
| Retired SS6 | | 23 | (Sweden) Stig Blomqvist | (Venezuela) Ana Goñi | (United Kingdom) David Sutton Cars Ltd | Mitsubishi Lancer Evo VI | Radiator | | 0 |
| Retired SS4 | | 38 | (Japan) Masayuki Yamada | (Japan) Shunichi Washio | (Japan) Masayuki Yamada | Subaru Impreza | Engine | | 0 |
| Retired SS3 | | 49 | (Kenya) Diamond Lalani | (Kenya) Thomas Hansen | (Kenya) Diamond Lalani | Subaru Impreza | Over time limit | | 0 |
| Retired SS2 | | 43 | (Kenya) John Ngunjiri | (Kenya) Thuita Karanja | (Kenya) John Ngunjiri | Subaru Impreza | Engine | | 0 |
| Retired SS1 | | 37 | (Kenya) Jamil Khan | (Kenya) Bill Kirk | (Kenya) Jamil Khan | Subaru Impreza | Clutch | | 0 |
| Retired SS1 | | 39 | (Italy) Stefano Marrini | (Italy) Tiziana Sandroni | (Italy) Stefano Marrini | Mitsubishi Lancer Evo VI | Codriver ill | | 0 |

==== Special stages ====
| Day | Stage | Stage name | Length | Winner | Car | Time | Class leaders |
|---|---|---|---|---|---|---|---|
| Leg 1 (20 Jul) | SS1 | Oltepesi 1 | 117.46 km | (Argentina) Gabriel Pozzo | Mitsubishi Lancer Evo VI | 1:06:25 | (Argentina) Gabriel Pozzo |
| Leg 1 (20 Jul) | SS2 | Kajiado 1 | 49.95 km | (Argentina) Marcos Ligato | Mitsubishi Lancer Evo VI | 30:03 | (Argentina) Gabriel Pozzo |
| Leg 1 (20 Jul) | SS3 | Orien 1 | 112.52 km | (Argentina) Gabriel Pozzo | Mitsubishi Lancer Evo VI | 57:20 | (Argentina) Gabriel Pozzo |
| Leg 1 (20 Jul) | SS4 | Maili Tisa 1 | 71.83 km | (Argentina) Gabriel Pozzo | Mitsubishi Lancer Evo VI | 54:44 | (Argentina) Gabriel Pozzo |
| Leg 2 (21 Jul) | SS5 | Marigat | 124.48 km | (Argentina) Marcos Ligato | Mitsubishi Lancer Evo VI | 1:10:14 | (Argentina) Gabriel Pozzo |
| Leg 2 (21 Jul) | SS6 | Mbaruk 1 | 84.58 km | (Argentina) Gabriel Pozzo | Mitsubishi Lancer Evo VI | 54:36 | (Argentina) Gabriel Pozzo |
| Leg 2 (21 Jul) | SS7 | Nyaru | 72.37 km | (Argentina) Marcos Ligato | Mitsubishi Lancer Evo VI | 47:58 | (Argentina) Gabriel Pozzo |
| Leg 2 (21 Jul) | SS8 | Marigat | 60.23 km | (Argentina) Marcos Ligato | Mitsubishi Lancer Evo VI | 32:11 | (Argentina) Gabriel Pozzo |
| Leg 2 (21 Jul) | SS9 | Mbaruk 2 | 84.58 km | (Argentina) Marcos Ligato | Mitsubishi Lancer Evo VI | 55:54 | (Argentina) Gabriel Pozzo |
| Leg 3 (22 Jul) | SS10 | Oltepesi 2 | 117.46 km | (Argentina) Marcos Ligato | Mitsubishi Lancer Evo VI | 1:12:46 | (Argentina) Marcos Ligato |
| Leg 3 (22 Jul) | SS11 | Kajiado 2 | 49.95 km | Stage cancelled | | | (Argentina) Marcos Ligato |
| Leg 3 (22 Jul) | SS12 | Orien 2 | 112.52 km | (Argentina) Gabriel Pozzo | Mitsubishi Lancer Evo VI | 1:01:01 | (Argentina) Gabriel Pozzo |
| Leg 3 (22 Jul) | SS13 | Maili Tisa 2 | 71.83 km | (Argentina) Marcos Ligato | Mitsubishi Lancer Evo VI | 50:41 | (Argentina) Gabriel Pozzo |

==== Championship standings ====
| Pos. | Drivers' championships | | |
| Pos. | Move | Driver | Points |
|---|---|---|---|
| 1 | | (Argentina) Gabriel Pozzo | 47 |
| 2 | | (Uruguay) Gustavo Trelles | 26 |
| 3 | | (Austria) Manfred Stohl | 12 |
| 4 | 8 | (Argentina) Marcos Ligato | 12 |
| 5 | 1 | (Switzerland) Olivier Gillet | 10 |
