= Škoda Felicia Kit Car =

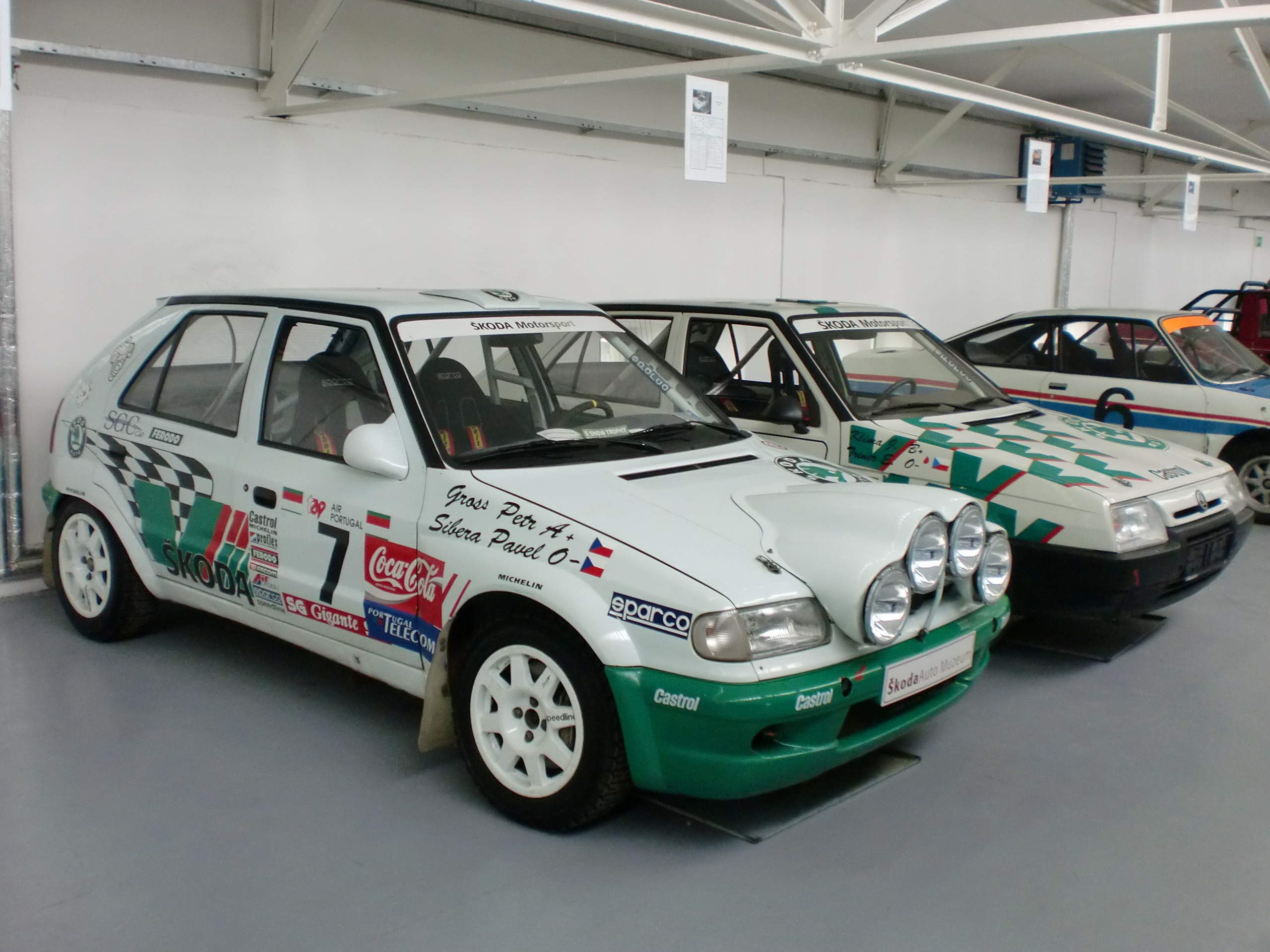
Škoda Felicia Kit Car 1500 (1994) in Škoda Auto Museum

Škoda Felicia Kit Car was the successor to successful racing version of the Škoda Felicia. Its engine was based on serial engine with improved suction and new exhaust and with different cylinders and bigger stroke. The only disadvantage was two valve technology, so Škoda Motorsport asked the FIA for change in regulations so they could improve their engines. They succeeded and were able to build more powerful engines.

Škoda Felicia Kit Car was available in three versions - 1,3l (1994–95), 1,5l (1994–96) and 1,6l (1996–97), that produced 108 kW (145 hp) at 7800 rpm (1,3l). In mid-1995 it was replaced by an engine 115 kW (154 hp) at 7000 rpm (1,5l) and until 1996 its performance was increased to 122 kW (164 hp) at 7500 rpm. At the end of 1996 it was replaced by an engine 128 kW (172 hp) at 8000 rpm (1,6l). They were combined with 6-speed H-shift transmissions. 48 Felicia Kit Cars were built in Škoda Motorsport factory, some of them are still active now.

The premiere of Felicia Kit Car was on Rally Sweden in 1995. After many retirements and some good results in 1995 Škoda unified the engine to 1500 cc. The most successful year for Škoda Felicia Kit Car was in 1996. Škoda Motorsport used VW 1,6l 8V engine that produced 6 kW (8 hp) more than 1,5l unit. The result was only 3rd place in 1996 World Rally Championship in F2 class, but they were fighting for the title the whole season with Seat. The unravelling came on the last rally of the season, the RAC, where after big misfortune Škoda lost their chance for victory. 1997 was the last year for Felicia, where in Rally of Finland came the successor, the Octavia Kit car.
