= Škoda Favorit =

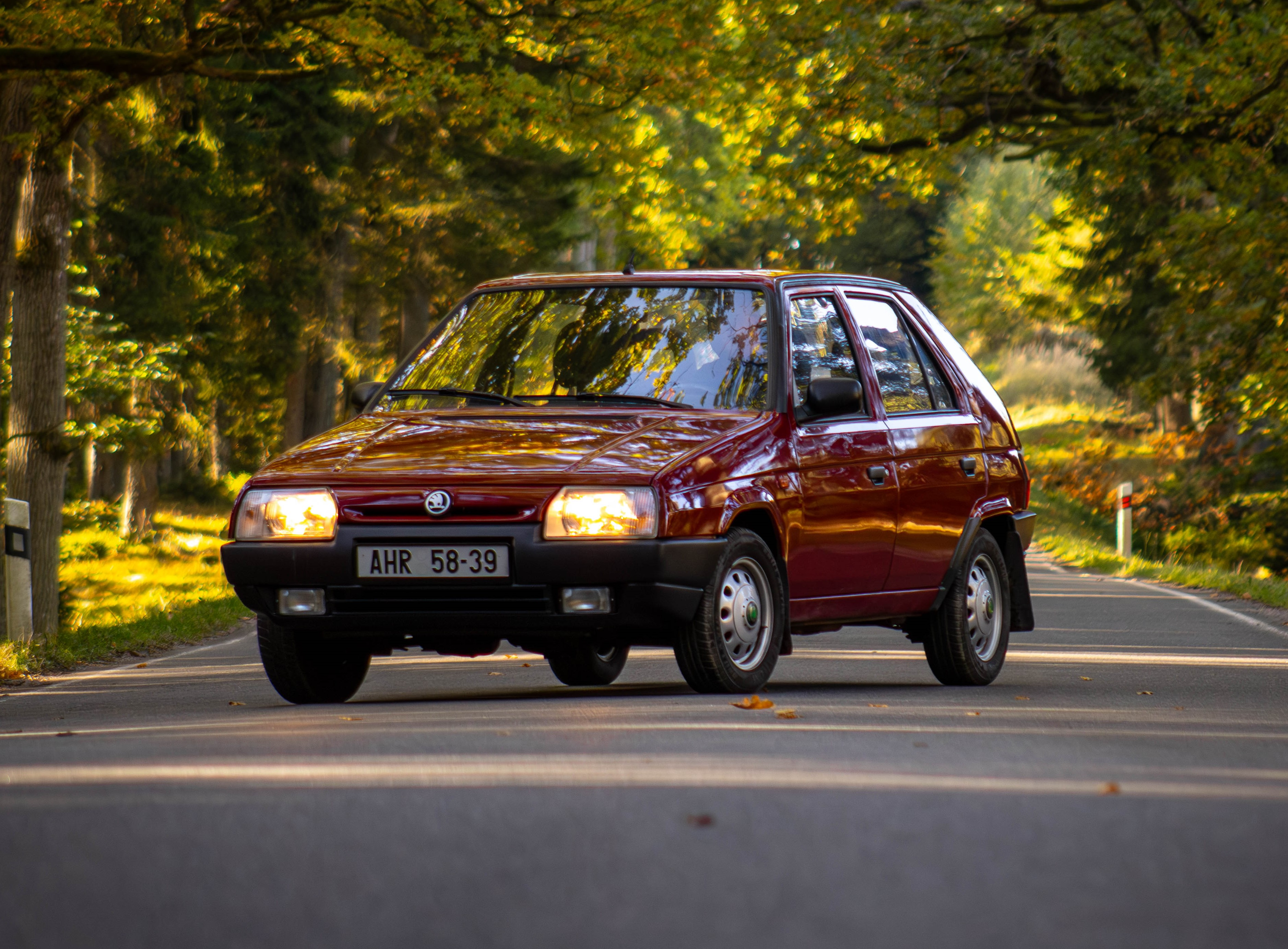

Overview
- Manufacturer: Škoda Auto
- Also called: Škoda Favorit Estate (Forman)
- Production: 1987–1994 (Favorit); 1990–1995 (Forman); 1991–1995 (Pick-up)
- Assembly: Vrchlabí, Czech Republic; Mladá Boleslav, Czech Republic; Kvasiny, Czech Republic; Poznań, Poland
- Designer: Bertone under Marc Deschamps

Body and chassis
- Class: Supermini (B)
- Body style: 5-door hatchback 5-door estate 2-door coupé utility (pick up)
- Layout: Front-engine, front-wheel-drive
- Related: Škoda Felicia; Volkswagen Caddy

Powertrain
- Engine: 1,289 cc I4 (petrol)
- Transmission: 5-speed manual

Dimensions
- Wheelbase: 2,450 mm (96.5 in)
- Length: 3,815 mm (150.2 in) (Favorit); 4,160 mm (163.8 in) (Forman); 4,065 mm (160.0 in) (Pick-up)
- Width: 1,620 mm (63.8 in)
- Height: 1,415 mm (55.7 in)
- Kerb weight: 840 kg (1,852 lb)

Chronology
- Predecessor: Škoda 120; Škoda 130
- Successor: Škoda Felicia

The Škoda Favorit (Type 781) is a supermini car which was made by Škoda Auto from 1987 to 1995. Initially it was only a five-door hatchback, but two other body styles were later added: A five-door estate car in 1990 called the Škoda Forman (Type 785) and a two-door coupé utility truck in 1991 called the Škoda Pick-up (Type 787). The Favorit was Škoda's first car to follow the European trend of locating the engine at the front, mounted transversely, and was also their first car to use front-wheel drive. It was premiered in July 1987 at the Brno Engineering Fair in Czechoslovakia. The Favorit name was previously used for the Type 904 and 923 models produced by Škoda from 1936 to 1941.

== History ==
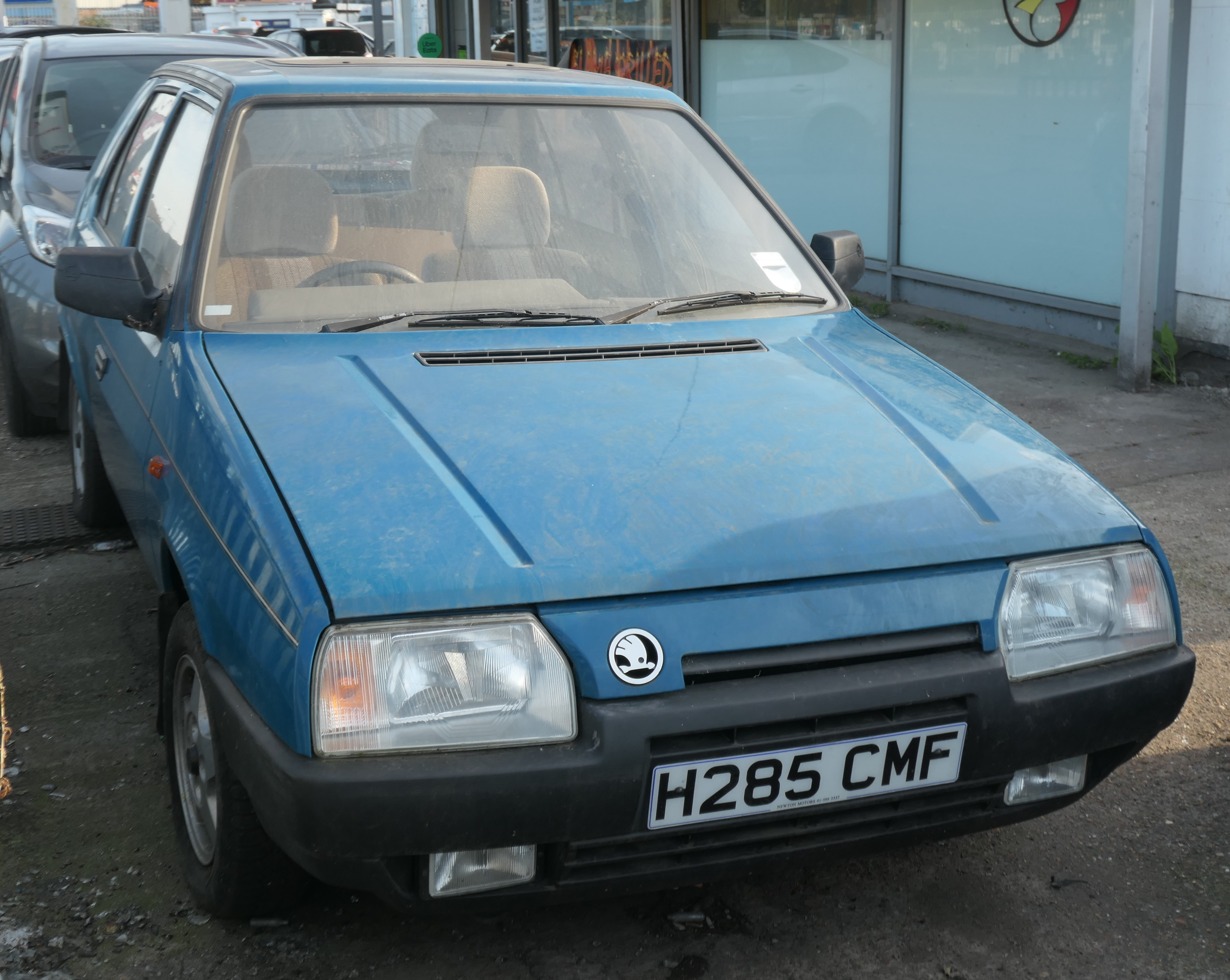
Škoda Favorit front (pre-facelift)

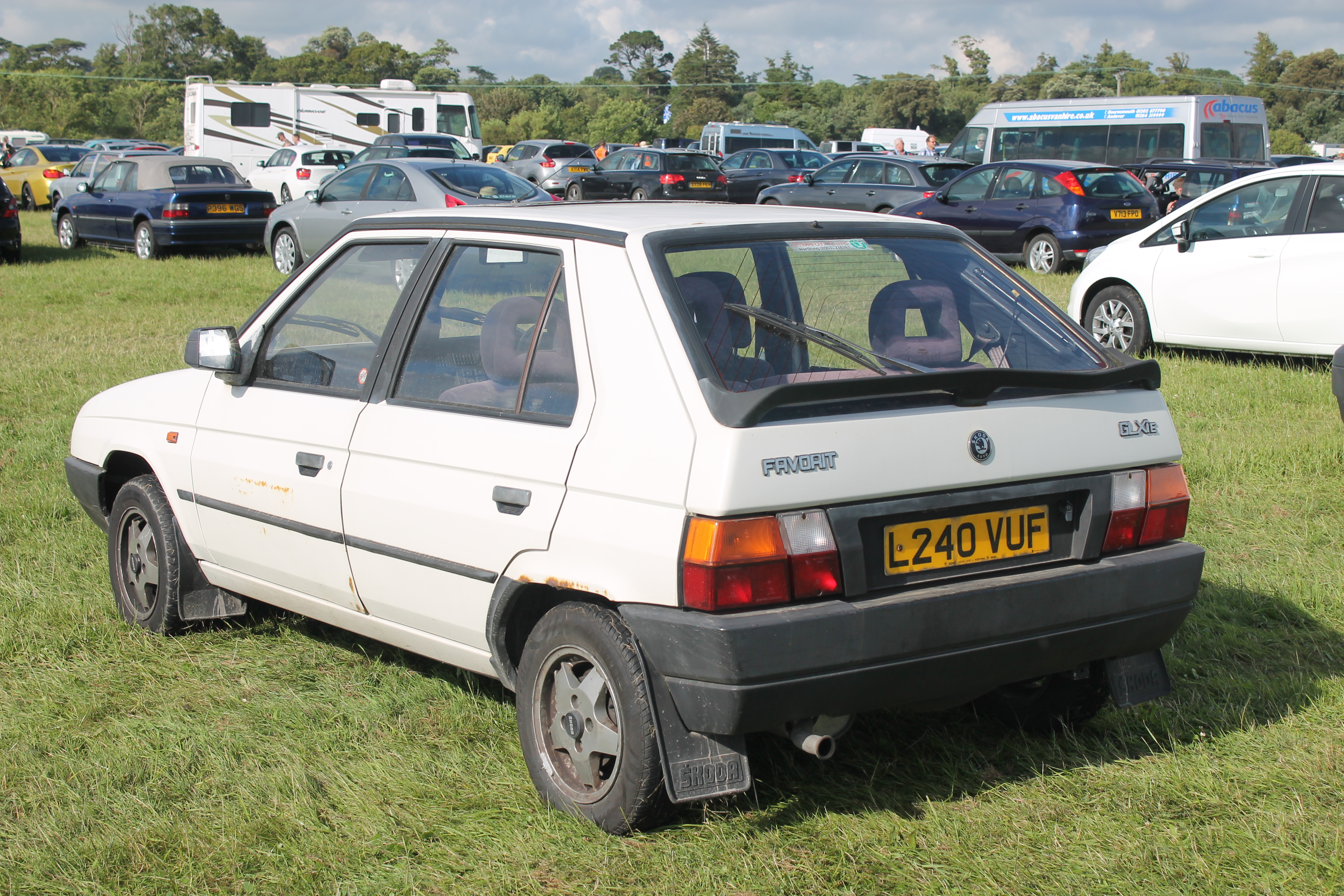
Škoda Favorit rear (post-facelift)

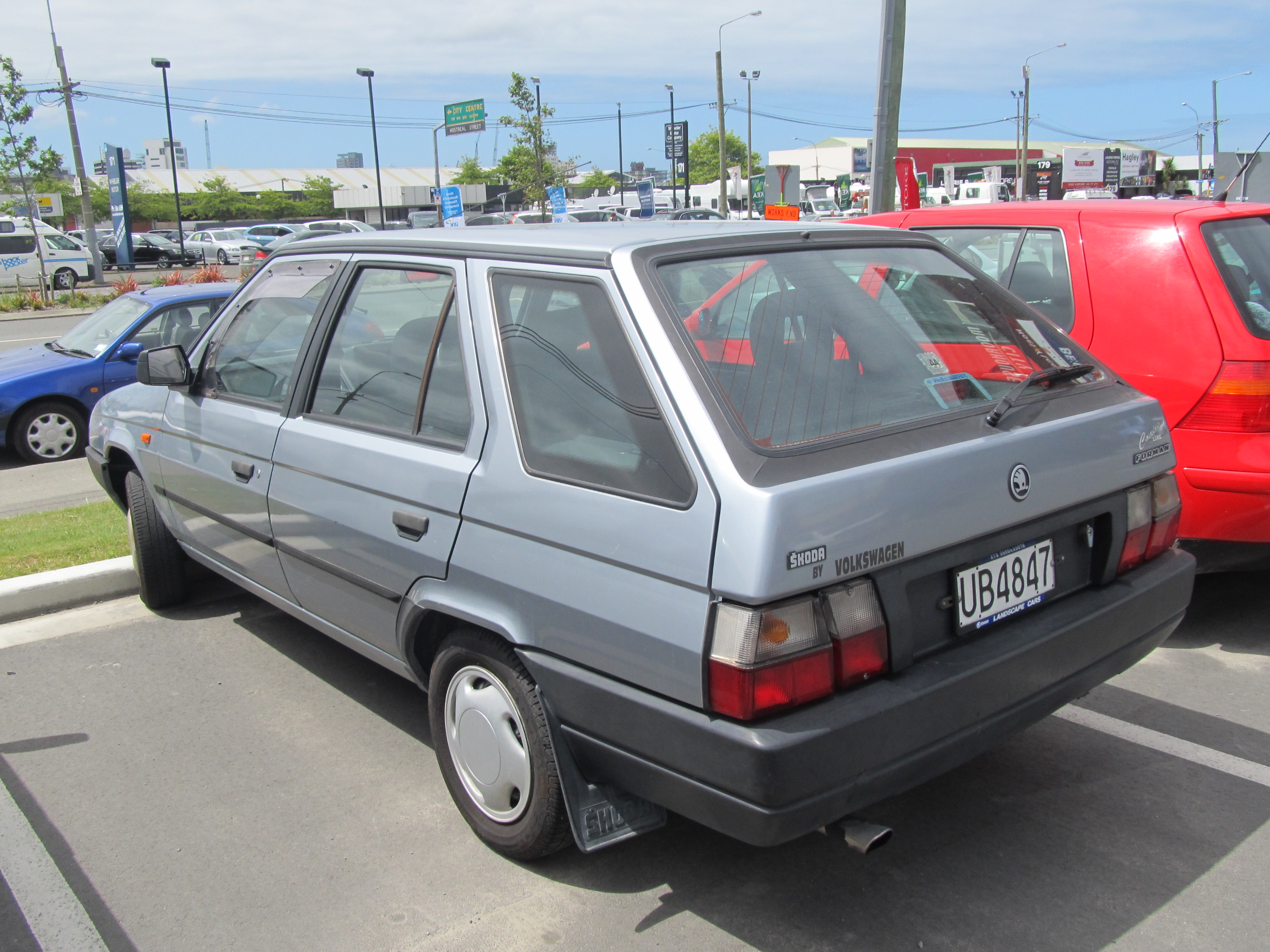
Škoda Forman rear

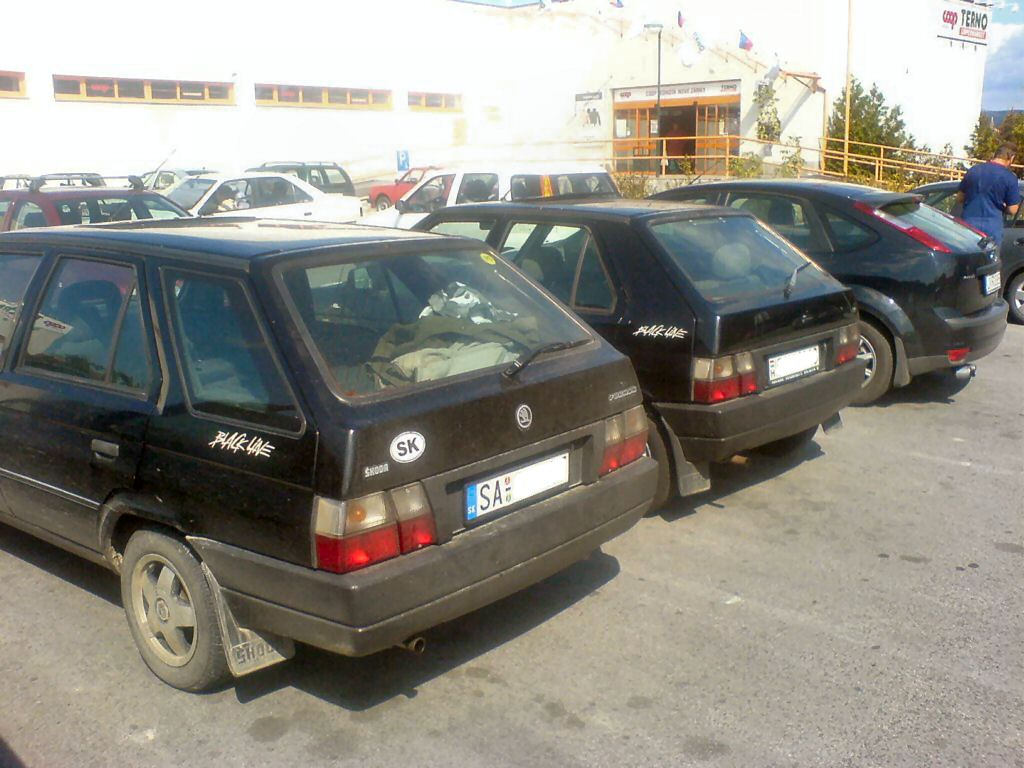
Black Line estate and hatchback side-by-side

This latest Favorit eventually succeeded the ageing rear-engined, rear-wheel drive Škoda 105/120 Estelle, and was a considerable move towards the modern mainstream in design terms thanks to its Bertone-designed hatchback body and front-wheel drive. However, the Favorit initially took a long time to get to market - Škoda's then owner, the communist government of Czechoslovakia approved the development of this new front-wheel drive car back in 1982, with actual development not starting until 1983. Disputes between the government's brief, and Nuccio Bertone, the styling studio owner, meant that the car was not designed until mid-1985, and full production would not commence until 1987. Probably the worst aspects of this dispute is that a four-door saloon car and two-door hatchback coupé were fully designed, but never went into production.

The Favorit proved itself as one of Central Europe's most popular cars, and was also exported to a number of countries including Argentina, Bosnia and Herzegovina, Chile, China, Colombia, Ecuador, Peru, Israel, Poland, Russia, Turkey and other countries.

The Favorit was replaced in 1994 by the Škoda Felicia, which was developed in conjunction with Volkswagen Group, who were by then the owners of Škoda Auto.

It is perhaps comparable to the Volkswagen Polo (fuel injected versions share the Bosch Mono-Motronic 1.2.3 engine management system with the Volkswagen Polo Mk2 and Volkswagen Golf Mk3) due to its large engine compartment, contributing to the possibility of easy repair. Parts are very universal with other Eastern European cars. Its general design and mechanical functionality is very practical, especially in comparison to a Western car which requires expensive parts, or maintenance for simple knobs, buttons or other simple mechanical and rudimentary apparatus.

Some 50,000 examples of the Favorit were sold in the UK from 1989 to 1995, although just 232 were still on the road by December 2016, and they were disappearing fast. A 1993-reg blue Favorit became famous after it drove from Anfield, Liverpool to the Wanda Metropolitano stadium in Madrid for the 2019 UEFA Champions League Final, before making the return journey to Anfield. The outbound journey was filmed by British YouTuber and Liverpool fan Simon Wilson. The car cost a total of £40 and had three MOT failures, but once they were rectified it was retested and passed with five advisories.

== Body styles ==
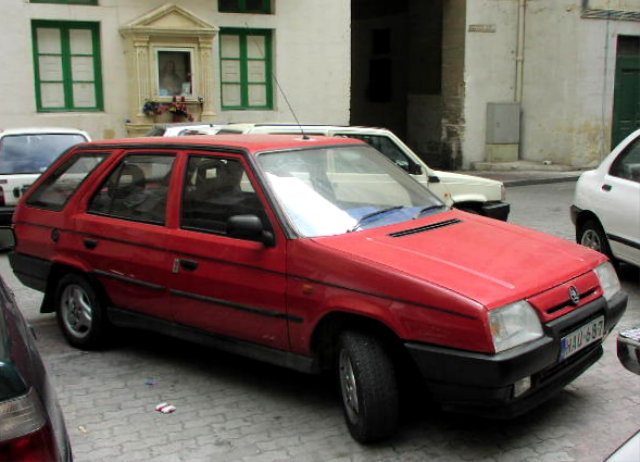
Škoda Forman

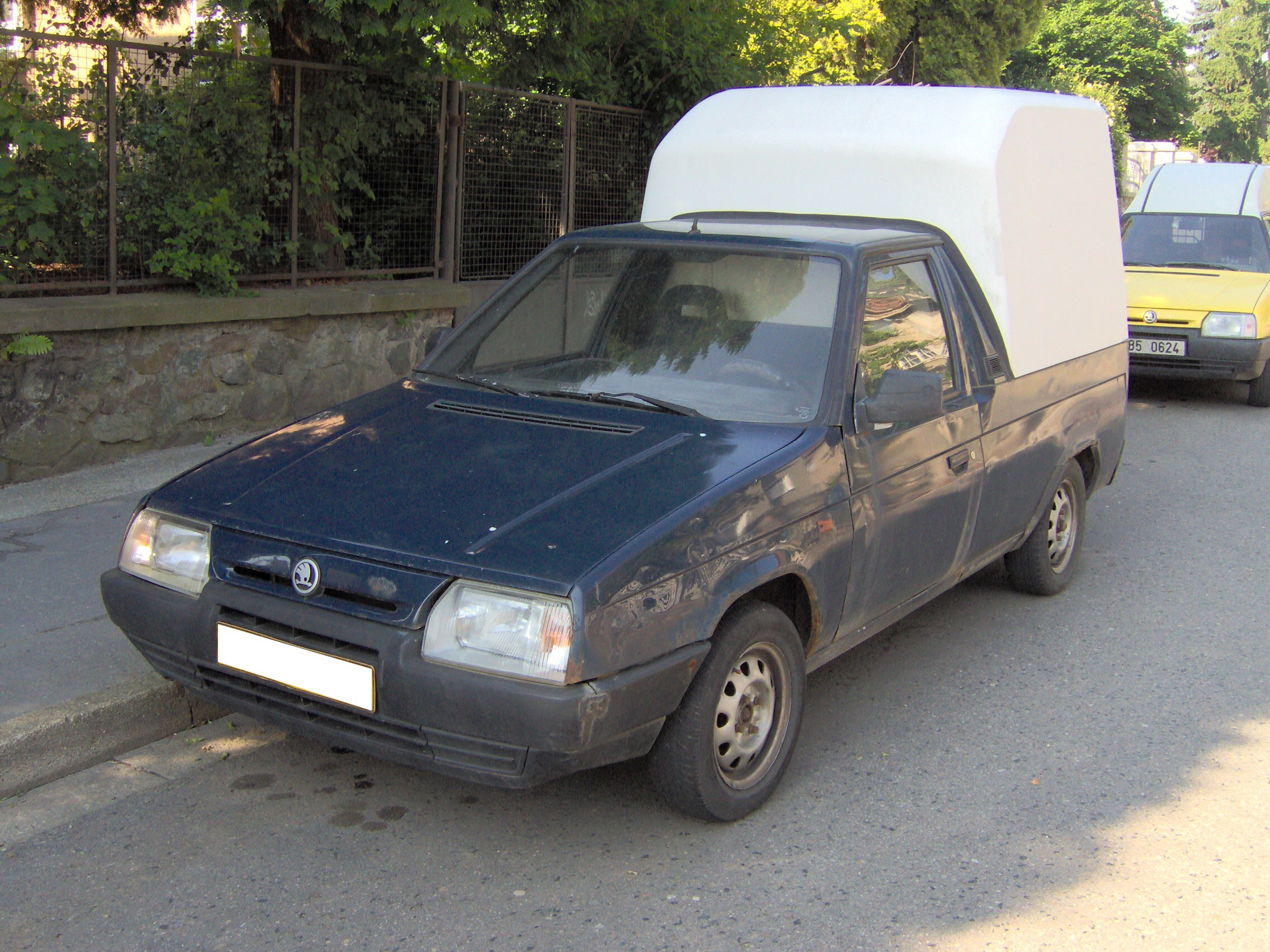
Škoda Pick-up

The car body style of the Škoda Favorit was a five-door five-seater hatchback.

A five-door estate version named the Škoda Forman (Type 785) appeared in 1990. This was known as the Favorit Estate in the UK from its launch in June 1991, two years after British buyers were first able to buy the hatchback. The name originates from the Czech word "forman", which in English is "wagoneer", or someone who transports goods by wagon. It is a common misconception that the name is somehow related to famous Czech filmmaker Miloš Forman.

A two-door two-seat pick-up truck, called the Škoda Pick-up (Type 787), was introduced the following year.

Following the takeover of Škoda Auto in 1991 by the Volkswagen Group, new developments and upgrades were rapidly implemented on the Favorit. This included new fuel injected catalytic converter versions, marketed as the Li, GLi and the GLXi models were introduced. At the same time many cosmetic improvements were made to the Favorit, such as improved door hinges, Volkswagen seats and interiors, dashboards and instrumentation. Quality control improvements were also implemented, along with safety features such as strengthened beams in the doors, and a redesigned front.

During 1993, another range of modernisations took place, which included mechanical and electrical upgrades to the engine, a facelift of the bodywork, and bigger bumpers.

Luggage capacity in the hatchback was 251 litres with the rear seats in the upright position, and this increased to 1,038 litres with the rear seats folded. For more luggage, the back seat could be removed completely.

Special versions were made in limited numbers. "Black Line" was sold with a pop-up sunroof, Hella clear rear lights, tinted windows all-around, power door locks, tachometer, digital clock in the centre overhead console, smart intermittent wipers, leather-wrapped steering wheel and gearchange knob, Hella headlight washer, and a Blaupunkt stereo with 4 speakers. The car is recognisable from the all-black paint, and the factory 13" Ronal F-Series alloy wheels. "Silver Line" was similar, only in metallic silver colour with a black fascia around the back window and the B pillars. These packages were available with both hatchback and estate body styles. "Solitaire" was very rare, including all of the above plus spoiler on the rear door, factory alarm system, power front windows and fuel injection. The other special versions came with either carburetted or fuel-injected engines.

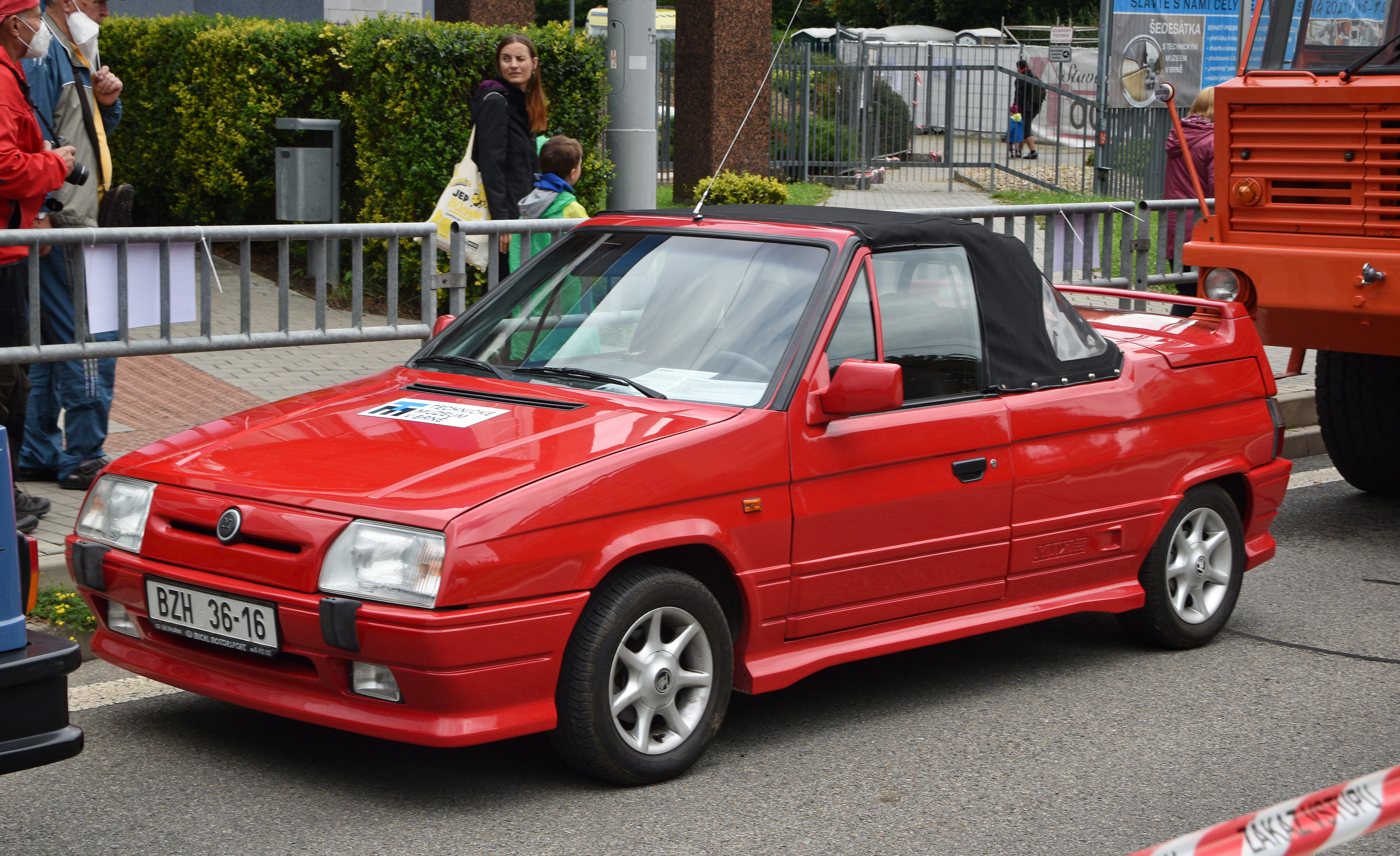
MTX Roadster

MTX produced a roadster version of the Favorit, the MTX Roadster.

== Powertrain ==
For all body styles, the powertrain of the Favorit used one internal combustion petrol engine, 1,289 cc (78.7 cu in), inline-four-cylinder, four-stroke, liquid-cooled, overhead valve. This initially produced a rated motive power output of 46 kW (63 PS; 62 bhp) at 5,000 rpm. It originally used either a Pierburg 2E-E Ecotronic single-barrel carburettor, or a Pierburg Ecotronic dual-barrel carburettor. This engine had its combustion chambers redesigned by Ricardo Consulting Engineers in the UK, while German car maker Porsche helped engineer the engine mountings. Throughout its timescale in the Favorit, the engine was progressively upgraded with various iterations of emissions control systems, including two different types of catalytic converter, and also utilised improved fuelling and engine control by way of Bosch Mono-Motronic single-point fuel injection. These changes had minor effects on the rated power (50 kW) and torque outputs. The engine requires the cam chain changed every 60,000 km, but it can last over 200,000 km (cases of engines working 400,000 km without the change of cam chain are known, although with serious degradation of performance, respectively). The chain is relatively short, but has no tensioner.

This engine was also used in Škoda Felicia with BMM and MPI injection, and until 2003 as a 1.4 MPI unit in the Škoda Fabia, and a 1.0 version in the Škoda Fabia, Seat Arosa and Volkswagen Lupo.

A smaller engine, with 1137 cc, having a 38 kw (52 hp) power was also available in some countries. This engine was in fact an enlarged version of the 1107 cc engine known from 1100-MB and S110, which were later enlarged to 1171 cc for skoda 120. However models having this engine were built in lower numbers as it was not very successful, despite the fact that it could operate on lower octane fuel, still available in eastern Europe countries, and it was not more economical than the 1289 cc versions. Even with this small engine, the car could still reach 140 km/h, but with a slower acceleration.

The only transmission available was a five-speed manual gearbox, which was of a transaxle design, and contained the differential and final drive units. Drive was through the front wheels.

=== Specifications ===
Car / engine	Displacement, fuel system, engine management, emissions control	Max. power at rpm	Max. torque at rpm	Years
Petrol engines (135)
135 / 1.3 43	1289 cc, Pierburg carburettor	43 kW (58 PS; 58 bhp) at 5,000	93 N⋅m (69 lb⋅ft) at 3,000–3,250	01/1989–07/1995
135 / 1.3 42	1289 cc, Pierburg carburettor non-regulated catalytic converter	42 kW (57 PS; 56 bhp) at 5,000	93 N⋅m (69 lb⋅ft) at 3,000–3,250	01/1991–12/1993
135 / 1.3 40	1289 cc, Pierburg carburettor Pierburg Ecotronic, regulated catalytic converter	40 kW (54 PS; 54 bhp) at 5,000	93 N⋅m (69 lb⋅ft) at 3,000–3,250	10/1990–12/1992
135I / 1.3 40	1289 cc, single-point fuel injection Bosch Mono-Motronic ECU, regulated catalytic converter	40 kW (54 PS; 54 bhp) at 5,000	93 N⋅m (69 lb⋅ft) at 3,000–3,250	01/1993–07/1995
Petrol engines (136)
136 / 1.3 46	1289 cc, carburettor	46 kW (63 PS; 62 bhp) at 5,000	100 N⋅m (74 lb⋅ft) at 3,000–3,750	08/1987–07/1991
136X / 1.3 50	1289 cc, carburettor	50 kW (68 PS; 67 bhp) at 5,000	100 N⋅m (74 lb⋅ft) at 3,000–3,750	03/1993–09/1994
136I / 1.3 50	1289 cc, single-point fuel injection Bosch Mono-Motronic ECU, regulated catalytic converter	50 kW (68 PS; 67 bhp) at 5,000	100 N⋅m (74 lb⋅ft) at 3,000–3,750	01/1993–07/1995

== Motorsport ==
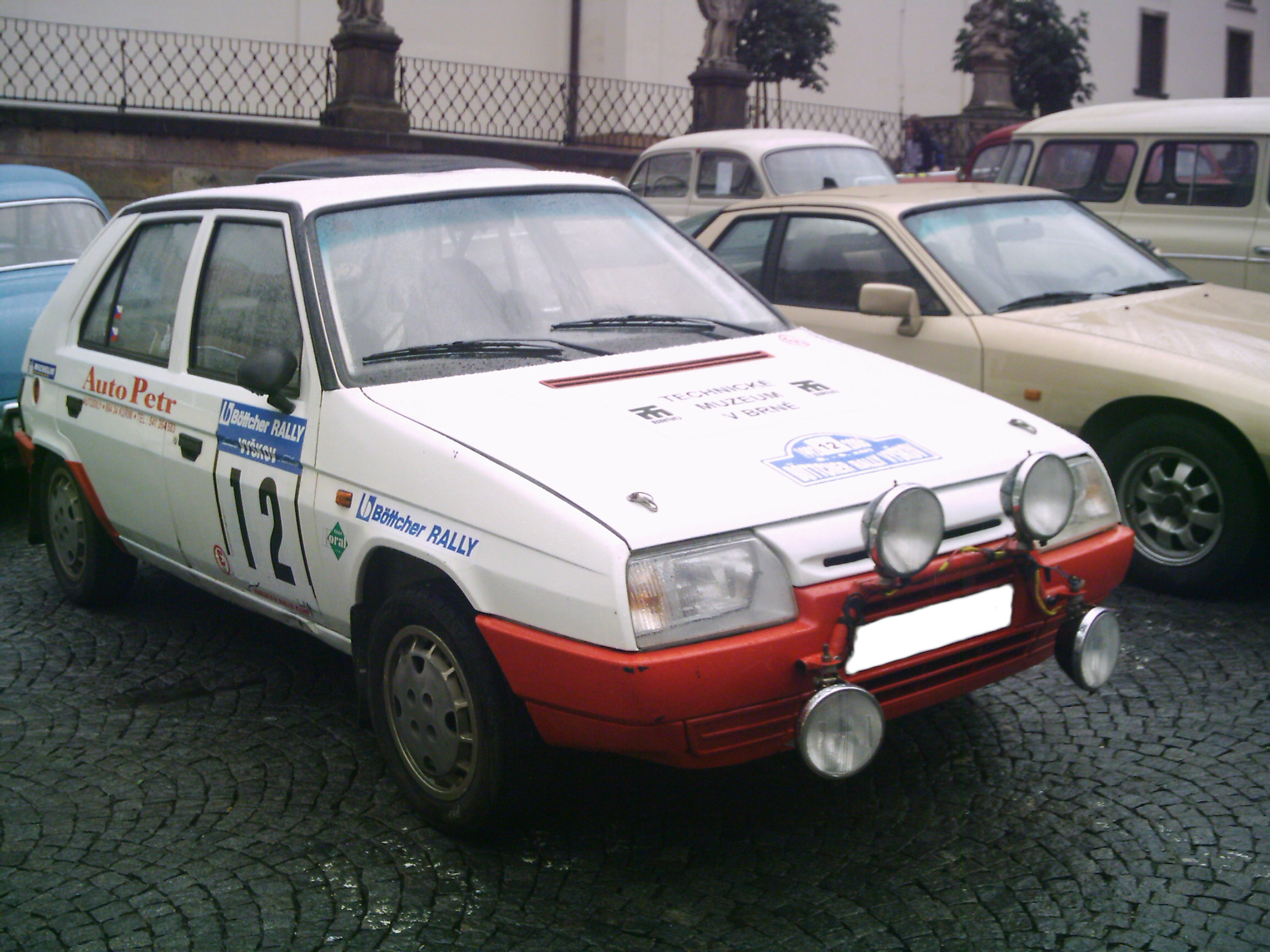
A rally prepared Škoda Favorit. This is a non-official car used by a "privateer" to compete in the Czech Böttcher Rally.

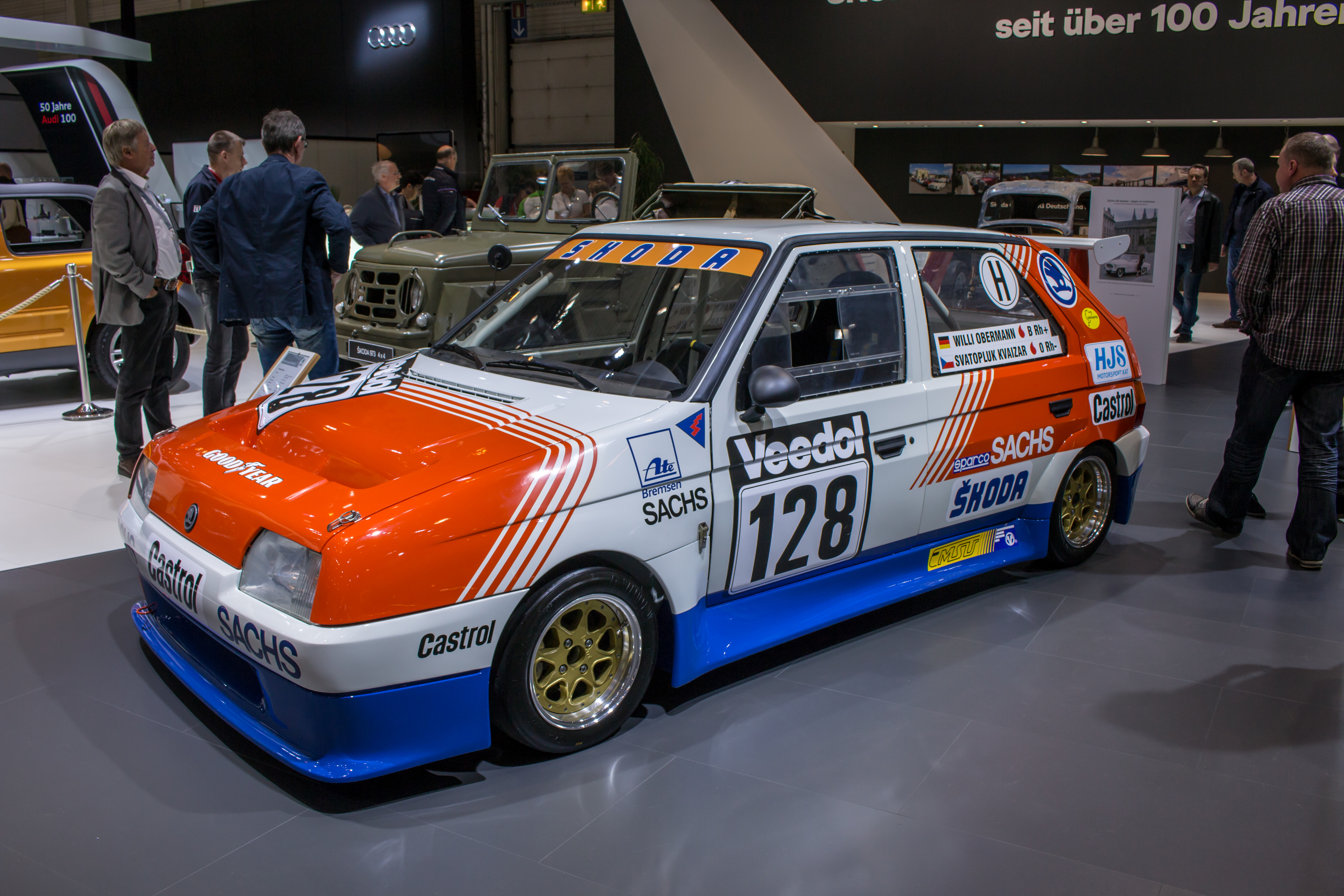
Favorit RS

Two Favorits finished first and second in the under-1300 cc class in the 1993 Monte Carlo Rally, coming in 18th and 23rd overall respectively.

The Škoda Motorsport-entered Favorit proceeded to win outright in the 2-litre Manufacturers Championship category of the 1994 FIA World Rally Championship with a total of 43 points, despite having only a 1.3-litre engine. It defeated rival cars from manufacturers such as Ford, Citroën (AX Sport), Peugeot (205 Rallye and 205 GTI), Fiat (Cinquecento), Renault, Rover (Mini Cooper), Suzuki (Swift GTI), Daihatsu (Charade 1.3i), Lada (Riva), and even Trabant P 601. It also competed against cars from other marques from its future parent Volkswagen Group, namely Volkswagen and SEAT (Marbella GL). Works driver Pavel Sibera managed to pilot the Favorit into the overall top ten classification on two occasions, which included the main World Rally Championship category, and his team-mate Emil Triner achieved the same feat, with a highest placing of 9th overall in the Acropolis Rally, and 8th in the Rallye de España.

There were also prototypes with Škoda's 1.6 OHC engine.
