= List of World Rally Championship seasons =

The list of World Rally Championship seasons includes all seasons of the FIA World Rally Championship, from the inaugural 1973 season.

== WRC seasons ==
Season	Events	Drivers' championship			Manufacturers' championship		
Season	Events	1st	2nd	3rd	1st	2nd	3rd
1973	13	No drivers' championship			(France) Alpine-Renault	(Italy) Fiat	(United Kingdom) Ford
1974	8	No drivers' championship			(Italy) Lancia	(Italy) Fiat	(United Kingdom) Ford
1975	10	No drivers' championship			(Italy) Lancia	(Italy) Fiat	(France) Alpine-Renault
1976	10	No drivers' championship			(Italy) Lancia	(Germany) Opel	(United Kingdom) Ford
1977	11	(Italy) Sandro Munari	(Sweden) Björn Waldegård	(France) Bernard Darniche	(Italy) Fiat	(United Kingdom) Ford	(Japan) Toyota
1978	11	(Finland) Markku Alén	(France) Jean-Pierre Nicolas	(Finland) Hannu Mikkola	(Italy) Fiat	(United Kingdom) Ford	(Germany) Opel
1979	12	(Sweden) Björn Waldegård	(Finland) Hannu Mikkola	(Finland) Markku Alén	(United Kingdom) Ford	(Japan) Datsun	(Italy) Fiat
1980	12	(Germany) Walter Röhrl	(Finland) Hannu Mikkola	(Sweden) Björn Waldegård	(Italy) Fiat	(Japan) Datsun	(United Kingdom) Ford
1981	12	(Finland) Ari Vatanen	(France) Guy Fréquelin	(Finland) Hannu Mikkola	(United Kingdom) Talbot	(Japan) Datsun	(United Kingdom) Ford
1982	12	(Germany) Walter Röhrl	(France) Michèle Mouton	(Finland) Hannu Mikkola	(Germany) Audi	(Germany) Opel	(Japan) Nissan
1983	12	(Finland) Hannu Mikkola	(Germany) Walter Röhrl	(Finland) Markku Alén	(Italy) Lancia	(Germany) Audi	(Germany) Opel
1984	12	(Sweden) Stig Blomqvist	(Finland) Hannu Mikkola	(Finland) Markku Alén	(Germany) Audi	(Italy) Lancia	(France) Peugeot
1985	12	(Finland) Timo Salonen	(Sweden) Stig Blomqvist	(Germany) Walter Röhrl	(France) Peugeot	(Germany) Audi	(Italy) Lancia
1986	12	(Finland) Juha Kankkunen	(Finland) Markku Alén	(Finland) Timo Salonen	(France) Peugeot	(Italy) Lancia	(Germany) Volkswagen
1987	13	(Finland) Juha Kankkunen	(Italy) Miki Biasion	(Finland) Markku Alén	(Italy) Lancia	(Germany) Audi	(France) Renault
1988	13	(Italy) Miki Biasion	(Finland) Markku Alén	(Italy) Alex Fiorio	(Italy) Lancia	(United Kingdom) Ford	(Germany) Audi
1989	13	(Italy) Miki Biasion	(Italy) Alex Fiorio	(Finland) Juha Kankkunen	(Italy) Lancia	(Japan) Toyota	(Japan) Mazda
1990	12	(Spain) Carlos Sainz	(France) Didier Auriol	(Finland) Juha Kankkunen	(Italy) Lancia	(Japan) Toyota	(Japan) Mitsubishi
1991	14	(Finland) Juha Kankkunen	(Spain) Carlos Sainz	(France) Didier Auriol	(Italy) Lancia	(Japan) Toyota	(Japan) Mitsubishi
1992	14	(Spain) Carlos Sainz	(Finland) Juha Kankkunen	(France) Didier Auriol	(Italy) Lancia	(Japan) Toyota	(United Kingdom) Ford
1993	13	(Finland) Juha Kankkunen	(France) François Delecour	(France) Didier Auriol	(Japan) Toyota	(United Kingdom) Ford	(Japan) Subaru
1994	10	(France) Didier Auriol	(Spain) Carlos Sainz	(Finland) Juha Kankkunen	(Japan) Toyota	(Japan) Subaru	(United Kingdom) Ford
1995	8	(United Kingdom) Colin McRae	(Spain) Carlos Sainz	(Sweden) Kenneth Eriksson	(Japan) Subaru	(Japan) Mitsubishi	(United Kingdom) Ford
1996	9	(Finland) Tommi Mäkinen	(United Kingdom) Colin McRae	(Spain) Carlos Sainz	(Japan) Subaru	(Japan) Mitsubishi	(United Kingdom) Ford
1997	14	(Finland) Tommi Mäkinen	(United Kingdom) Colin McRae	(Spain) Carlos Sainz	(Japan) Subaru	(United Kingdom) Ford	(Japan) Mitsubishi
1998	13	(Finland) Tommi Mäkinen	(Spain) Carlos Sainz	(United Kingdom) Colin McRae	(Japan) Mitsubishi	(Japan) Toyota	(Japan) Subaru
1999	14	(Finland) Tommi Mäkinen	(United Kingdom) Richard Burns	(France) Didier Auriol	(Japan) Toyota	(Japan) Subaru	(Japan) Mitsubishi
2000	14	(Finland) Marcus Grönholm	(United Kingdom) Richard Burns	(Spain) Carlos Sainz	(France) Peugeot	(United Kingdom) Ford	(Japan) Subaru
2001	14	(United Kingdom) Richard Burns	(United Kingdom) Colin McRae	(Finland) Tommi Mäkinen	(France) Peugeot	(United Kingdom) Ford	(Japan) Mitsubishi
2002	14	(Finland) Marcus Grönholm	(Norway) Petter Solberg	(Spain) Carlos Sainz	(France) Peugeot	(United Kingdom) Ford	(Japan) Subaru
2003	14	(Norway) Petter Solberg	(France) Sébastien Loeb	(Spain) Carlos Sainz	(France) Citroën	(France) Peugeot	(Japan) Subaru
2004	16	(France) Sébastien Loeb	(Norway) Petter Solberg	(Estonia) Markko Märtin	(France) Citroën	(United Kingdom) Ford	(Japan) Subaru
2005	16	(France) Sébastien Loeb	(Norway) Petter Solberg	(Finland) Marcus Grönholm	(France) Citroën	(France) Peugeot	(United Kingdom) Ford
2006	16	(France) Sébastien Loeb	(Finland) Marcus Grönholm	(Finland) Mikko Hirvonen	(United Kingdom) Ford	(France) Kronos Citroën	(Japan) Subaru
2007	16	(France) Sébastien Loeb	(Finland) Marcus Grönholm	(Finland) Mikko Hirvonen	(United Kingdom) Ford	(France) Citroën	(Japan) Subaru
2008	15	(France) Sébastien Loeb	(Finland) Mikko Hirvonen	(Spain) Dani Sordo	(France) Citroën	(United Kingdom) Ford	(Japan) Subaru
2009	12	(France) Sébastien Loeb	(Finland) Mikko Hirvonen	(Spain) Dani Sordo	(France) Citroën	(United Kingdom) Ford	(United Kingdom) Stobart Ford
2010	13	(France) Sébastien Loeb	(Finland) Jari-Matti Latvala	(Norway) Petter Solberg	(France) Citroën	(United Kingdom) Ford	(France) Citroën Junior
2011	13	(France) Sébastien Loeb	(Finland) Mikko Hirvonen	(France) Sébastien Ogier	(France) Citroën	(United Kingdom) Ford	(United Kingdom) Stobart Ford
2012	13	(France) Sébastien Loeb	(Finland) Mikko Hirvonen	(Finland) Jari-Matti Latvala	(France) Citroën	(United Kingdom) Ford	(United Kingdom) M-Sport Ford
2013	13	(France) Sébastien Ogier	(Belgium) Thierry Neuville	(Finland) Jari-Matti Latvala	(Germany) Volkswagen	(France) Citroën	(United Kingdom) M-Sport
2014	13	(France) Sébastien Ogier	(Finland) Jari-Matti Latvala	(Norway) Andreas Mikkelsen	(Germany) Volkswagen	(France) Citroën	(United Kingdom) M-Sport
2015	13	(France) Sébastien Ogier	(Finland) Jari-Matti Latvala	(Norway) Andreas Mikkelsen	(Germany) Volkswagen	(France) Citroën	(South Korea) Hyundai
2016	13	(France) Sébastien Ogier	(Belgium) Thierry Neuville	(Norway) Andreas Mikkelsen	(Germany) Volkswagen	(South Korea) Hyundai	(Germany) Volkswagen II
2017	13	(France) Sébastien Ogier	(Belgium) Thierry Neuville	(Estonia) Ott Tänak	(United Kingdom) M-Sport	(South Korea) Hyundai	(Japan) Toyota
2018	13	(France) Sébastien Ogier	(Belgium) Thierry Neuville	(Estonia) Ott Tänak	(Japan) Toyota	(South Korea) Hyundai	(United Kingdom) M-Sport Ford
2019	13	(Estonia) Ott Tänak	(Belgium) Thierry Neuville	(France) Sébastien Ogier	(South Korea) Hyundai	(Japan) Toyota	(France) Citroën
2020	7	(France) Sébastien Ogier	(United Kingdom) Elfyn Evans	(Estonia) Ott Tänak	(South Korea) Hyundai	(Japan) Toyota	(United Kingdom) M-Sport Ford
2021	12	(France) Sébastien Ogier	(United Kingdom) Elfyn Evans	(Belgium) Thierry Neuville	(Japan) Toyota	(South Korea) Hyundai	(United Kingdom) M-Sport Ford
2022	13	(Finland) Kalle Rovanperä	(Estonia) Ott Tänak	(Belgium) Thierry Neuville	(Japan) Toyota	(South Korea) Hyundai	(United Kingdom) M-Sport Ford
2023	13	(Finland) Kalle Rovanperä	(United Kingdom) Elfyn Evans	(Belgium) Thierry Neuville	(Japan) Toyota	(South Korea) Hyundai	(United Kingdom) M-Sport Ford
2024	13	(Belgium) Thierry Neuville	(United Kingdom) Elfyn Evans	(Estonia) Ott Tänak	(Japan) Toyota	(South Korea) Hyundai	(United Kingdom) M-Sport Ford
2025	14	(France) Sébastien Ogier	(United Kingdom) Elfyn Evans	(Finland) Kalle Rovanperä	(Japan) Toyota	(South Korea) Hyundai	(United Kingdom) M-Sport Ford
2026	13	(United Kingdom) Elfyn Evans	(Sweden) Oliver Solberg	(Finland) Sami Pajari	(Japan) Toyota	(South Korea) Hyundai	(Japan) Toyota WRT2

== Statistics ==
=== By driver ===
Driver	1st	2nd	3rd
(France) Sébastien Loeb	9	1	0
(France) Sébastien Ogier	9	0	2
(Finland) Juha Kankkunen	4	1	3
(Finland) Tommi Mäkinen	4	0	1
(Spain) Carlos Sainz	2	4	5
(Finland) Marcus Grönholm	2	2	1
(Germany) Walter Röhrl	2	1	1
(Italy) Miki Biasion	2	1	0
(Finland) Kalle Rovanperä	2	0	1
(Belgium) Thierry Neuville	1	5	3
(United Kingdom) Elfyn Evans	1	5	0
(Finland) Hannu Mikkola	1	3	3
(United Kingdom) Colin McRae	1	3	1
(Norway) Petter Solberg	1	3	1
(Finland) Markku Alén	1	2	4
(United Kingdom) Richard Burns	1	2	0
(France) Didier Auriol	1	1	4
(Estonia) Ott Tänak	1	1	4
(Sweden) Björn Waldegård	1	1	1
(Sweden) Stig Blomqvist	1	1	0
(Finland) Timo Salonen	1	0	1
(Italy) Sandro Munari	1	0	0
(Finland) Ari Vatanen	1	0	0
(Finland) Mikko Hirvonen	0	4	2
(Finland) Jari-Matti Latvala	0	3	2
(Italy) Alex Fiorio	0	1	1
(France) Jean-Pierre Nicolas	0	1	0
(France) Guy Fréquelin	0	1	0
(France) Michèle Mouton	0	1	0
(France) François Delecour	0	1	0
(Sweden) Oliver Solberg	0	1	0
(Norway) Andreas Mikkelsen	0	0	3
(Spain) Dani Sordo	0	0	2
(France) Bernard Darniche	0	0	1
(Sweden) Kenneth Eriksson	0	0	1
(Estonia) Markko Märtin	0	0	1
(Finland) Sami Pajari	0	0	1
