= Lars-Erik Torph =

Swedish rally driver (1961–1989)

Personal information
- Nationality: (Sweden) Swedish
- Born: 11 January 1961; Säffle, Sweden
- Died: 23 January 1989 (aged 28)

World Rally Championship record
- Years active: 1980–1989
- Co-driver: (Sweden) Rune Gustavsson (Sweden) Yvonne Hultgren (Sweden) Samuel Bernårdsson (Sweden) Jan Svanström (United Kingdom) Keith Oswin (Sweden) Bo Thorszelius (Sweden) Benny Melander (Sweden) Tina Thörner (Sweden) Björn Cederberg
- Teams: Toyota, Volkswagen
- Rallies: 20
- Championships: 0
- Rally wins: 0
- Podiums: 4
- Stage wins: 3
- Total points: 74
- First rally: 1980 Swedish Rally
- Last rally: 1989 Swedish Rally

Lars-Erik Torph (11 January 1961 – 23 January 1989) was a Swedish rally driver. He debuted in the World Rally Championship in 1980 and took his first points at his home event, the Swedish Rally, in 1984. Driving a Toyota Celica TCT, a Toyota Supra 3.0i and an Audi Coupé Quattro, he went on to finish on the podium four times. After just turning 28, Torph and his co-driver Bertil-Rune Rehnfeldt died while spectating the 1989 Monte Carlo Rally, after Lancia driver Alex Fiorio lost control of his Delta Integrale and crashed into them.

== Career ==
Torph debuted in the World Rally Championship during the 1980 season, competing with a Volvo 142 at the Swedish Rally and at the 1000 Lakes Rally in Finland, retiring in both events. At his seventh WRC event, the 1984 Swedish Rally, he took his first WRC points by finishing fifth in an Opel Ascona for the Opel Team Sweden. In 1985, Torph drove to 11th place at his home event and then placed in the points at the 1000 Lakes Rally, taking ninth place in a Volkswagen Golf GTI for the Swedish Junior Team.

In the 1986 season, Torph competed in three rallies for Toyota Team Europe, Toyota's factory WRC team. He took his Toyota Celica TCT to second place at the endurance events Safari Rally and Rallye Côte d'Ivoire, losing the wins to compatriot and teammate Björn Waldegård. At the Olympus Rally, Torph finished fourth, but this time ahead of Waldegård who took fifth place. Points from these events placed Torph sixth in drivers' world championship.

In 1987, Torph again had a three-event contract with Toyota. He started his season at the Swedish Rally and finished 11th in his privateer Audi 80 Quattro. With a factory Toyota Supra 3.0i, he finished third at the Safari Rally behind Audi Sport's Hannu Mikkola and Walter Röhrl, despite a fever that lasted almost the duration of the event. At the Olympus Rally, he retired due to an engine problem. On the second day of the Rallye Côte d'Ivoire, Toyota's Cessna 340 aircraft crashed down and exploded, killing manager Henry Liddon, his assistant Nigel Harris, the pilot and the navigator. Toyota boss Ove Andersson withdrew all the factory Supra Turbos from the event.

During the 1988 season, Torph participated in only two WRC events. In Sweden, driving a privateer Audi Coupé Quattro, he took his fourth podium place finishing behind Markku Alén and Stig Blomqvist. For the Safari Rally, Torph had a factory team contract with Volkswagen but retired after his Golf GTI 16V developed an engine problem. Torph continued with the Coupé Quattro for the Team VAG Sweden in the 1989 season opener in Sweden, but retired after an ignition problem.

== Death ==
At the 1989 Monte Carlo Rally, Torph was not competing but only doing the reconnaissance (recce) to help fellow Swedish rally driver Fredrik Skoghag regarding pacenotes on icy surface. While taking a break from recce duties, Torph and his co-driver Bertil-Rune Rehnfeldt went to spectate the fifth stage of the rally. Italian driver Alex Fiorio lost control of his Lancia Delta Integrale, and then regained it only to go off the road and down an embankment on the other side. At about 145 km/h (90 mph), the car crashed into Torph and Rehnfeldt, killing both. Fiorio and his co-driver Luigi Pirollo were unhurt. Skoghag withdrew from the event, and Lancia's factory team Martini Lancia locked out the podium with drivers Miki Biasion 1st, Didier Auriol 2nd and Bruno Saby 3rd.
