= 1988 World Rally Championship =

16th season of the FIA World Rally Championship

Champions
- World Drivers' Champion: Miki Biasion
- World Manufacturers' Champion: Lancia

Seasons
- ← 1987 1989 →

The 1988 World Rally Championship was the 16th season of the Fédération Internationale de l'Automobile (FIA) World Rally Championship (WRC). The season consisted of 13 rallies, following the same schedule as the previous season.

Martini Lancia followed their successful previous season with an even more dominant performance in 1988, winning ten of the eleven rallies in which manufacturer points were awarded. The Lancia Delta HF 4WD proved fast and reliable in the hands of returning drivers Finn Markku Alén and Italian Miki Biasion. During the season, the car was replaced by the Delta HF Integrale, which was an immediate success. Biasion would take the drivers' title, with his Finnish teammate placing second behind him. Third driver Frenchman Bruno Saby also contributed to the effort with a rally win, though was not a major contender for the title. Jolly Club driver, Italian Alex Fiorio, would take third place in the driver championship at the wheel of a Lancia Delta as well.

Ford Motor Company struggled to compete, though it was the only other manufacturer besides Lancia to win a rally, with primary driver Didier Auriol winning the Tour de Corse in his Sierra RS Cosworth. Auriol would only reach 6th in the drivers' competition, while Spanish teammate Carlos Sainz would struggle to reach 11th in the standings. Stig Blomqvist, racing for Rallysport Sweden in a Sierra, would finish best amongst Ford drivers, taking 4th in the championship standings.

1988 marked the withdrawal of Audi Sport from the WRC, although a number of small teams and privateers were successful enough using Audi Quattro versions for the manufacturer to place 3rd amongst manufacturers despite the lack of a works effort. Mazda Rally Team Europe made a significant effort to compete with Finn Timo Salonen as their primary driver for the Mazda 323 4WD. Timo would garner 5th place in the driver standings while the manufacturer gained 4th place.

In addition to the primary driver and manufacturer championships, WRC also awarded the FIA Cup for Drivers of Production Cars for a second season. Belgian Pascal Gaban won the hotly contested contest in a Mazda 323 against Argentine Jorge Recalde in his Lancia Delta while Italian Giovanni Del Zoppo, another Delta pilot, finished well behind in third place.

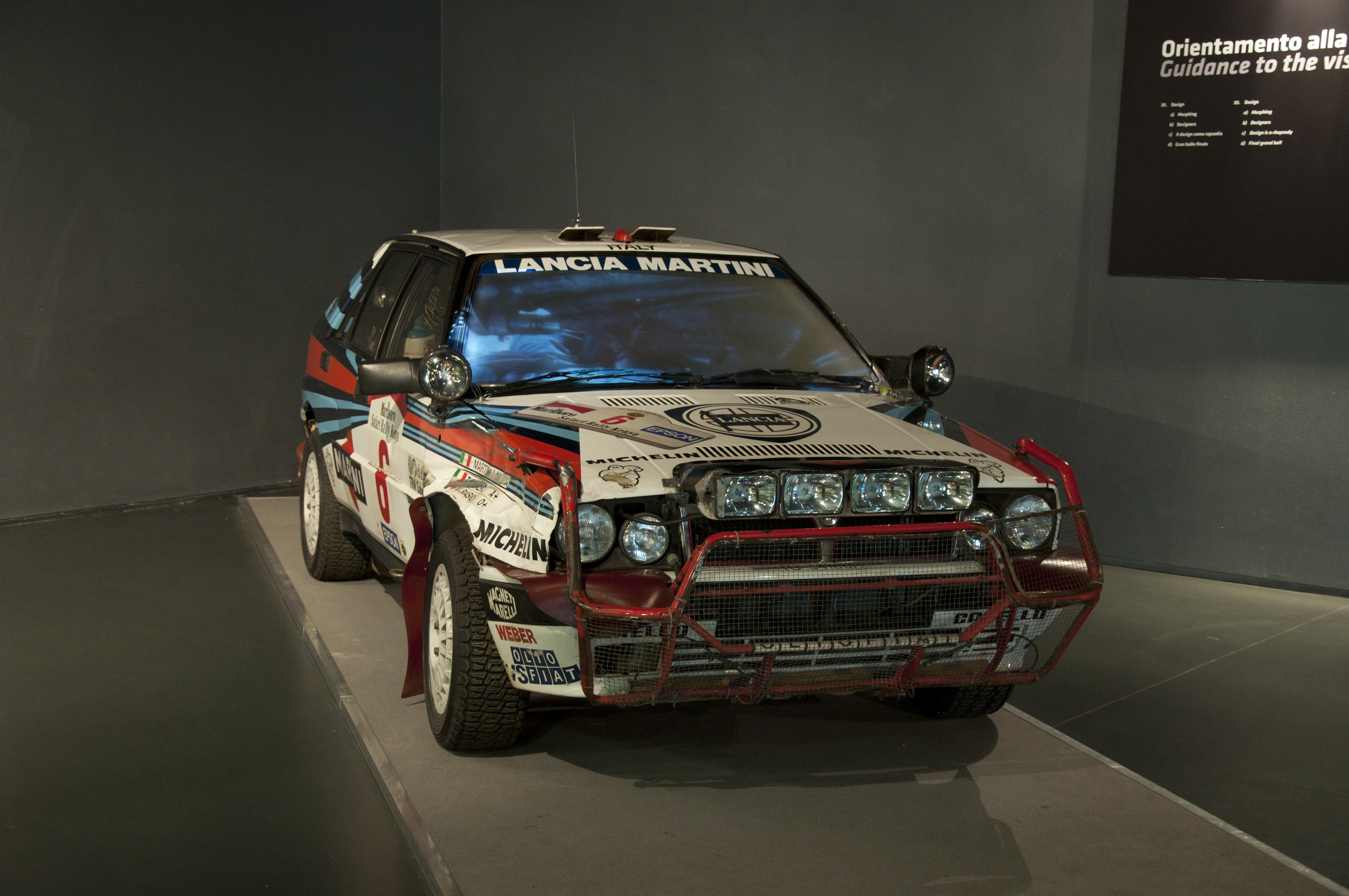
Miki Biasion claimed his first WRC drivers' title at the wheel of a Lancia Delta Integrale.

== Calendar ==
Rd.	Start date	Finish date	Rally	Rally headquarters	Surface	Stages	Distance	Points
1	17 January	21 January	(Monaco) 56th Rallye Automobile Monte-Carlo	Monte Carlo	Mixed	26	621 km	Drivers & Manufacturers
2	4 February	6 February	(Sweden) 38th International Swedish Rally	Karlstad, Värmland County	Snow	36	500.30 km	Drivers & Manufacturers
3	1 March	5 March	22nd Rallye de Portugal - Vinho do Porto	Estoril, Lisbon	Mixed	37	588.70 km	Drivers & Manufacturers
4	31 March	4 April	(Kenya) 36th Marlboro Safari Rally	Nairobi	Gravel	N/A	4205.77 km	Drivers & Manufacturers
5	3 May	6 May	32nd Tour de Corse - Rallye de France	Ajaccio, Corsica	Tarmac	30	622.84 km	Drivers & Manufacturers
6	29 May	1 June	(Greece) 35th Acropolis Rally	Athens	Gravel	32	526.10 km	Drivers & Manufacturers
7	23 June	26 June	(United States) 16th Olympus Rally	Tacoma, Washington	Gravel	38	549.91 km	Drivers & Manufacturers
8	9 July	12 July	19th Rothmans Rally of New Zealand	Auckland	Gravel	40	614.56 km	Drivers only
9	2 August	6 August	8th Marlboro Rally of Argentina	Buenos Aires	Gravel	29	583.60 km	Drivers & Manufacturers
10	26 August	28 August	(Finland) 38th 1000 Lakes Rally	Jyväskylä, Central Finland	Gravel	39	496.33 km	Drivers & Manufacturers
11	20 September	24 September	(Ivory Coast) 20th Marlboro Rallye Cote d'Ivoire	Abidjan	Gravel	N/A	3421.81 km	Drivers only
12	10 October	14 October	(Italy) 30th Rallye Sanremo - Rallye d'Italia	Sanremo, Liguria	Mixed	43	564.96 km	Drivers & Manufacturers
13	20 November	24 November	(United Kingdom) 44th Lombard RAC Rally	Harrogate	Gravel	52	602.60 km	Drivers & Manufacturers

== Teams and drivers ==
Team	Manufacturer	Car	Tyre	Drivers	Rounds
(Italy) Martini Lancia	Lancia	Delta HF 4WD; Delta HF Integrale	M	(Italy) Miki Biasion	1, 3–4, 6–7, 9, 12
(Italy) Martini Lancia	Lancia	Delta HF 4WD; Delta HF Integrale	M	(France) Bruno Saby	1, 5
(Italy) Martini Lancia	Lancia	Delta HF 4WD; Delta HF Integrale	M	(France) Yves Loubet	1, 5
(Italy) Martini Lancia	Lancia	Delta HF 4WD; Delta HF Integrale	M	(Sweden) Mikael Ericsson	2–3, 6, 10, 13
(Italy) Martini Lancia	Lancia	Delta HF 4WD; Delta HF Integrale	M	(Finland) Markku Alén	2–3, 6, 10, 12–13
(Italy) Martini Lancia	Lancia	Delta HF 4WD; Delta HF Integrale	M	(Kenya) Vic Preston Jr	4
(Italy) Martini Lancia	Lancia	Delta HF 4WD; Delta HF Integrale	M	(Argentina) Jorge Recalde	9
(Japan) Mazda Rally Team Europe	Mazda	323 4WD	M	(Finland) Timo Salonen	1–2, 6, 10, 13
(Japan) Mazda Rally Team Europe	Mazda	323 4WD	M	(Finland) Hannu Mikkola	1–3, 6, 10, 13
(Japan) Mazda Rally Team Europe	Mazda	323 4WD	M	(Sweden) Ingvar Carlsson	1–3
(Japan) Mazda Rally Team Europe	Mazda	323 4WD	M	(Sweden) Thorbjörn Edling	2, 10
(Japan) Mazda Rally Team Europe	Mazda	323 4WD	M	(Belgium) Pascal Gaban	2–3, 6, 10–13
(Japan) Mazda Rally Team Europe	Mazda	323 4WD	M	(New Zealand) Rod Millen	7
(Japan) Mazda Rally Team Europe	Mazda	323 4WD	M	(Belgium) Grégoire de Mévius	10, 13
(Italy) Jolly Club	Lancia	Delta HF 4WD; Delta HF Integrale	P	(Italy) Alex Fiorio	1–3, 6–7, 10, 12
(Italy) Jolly Club	Lancia	Delta HF 4WD; Delta HF Integrale	P	(France) Yves Loubet	3, 6, 12
(Italy) Jolly Club	Lancia	Delta HF 4WD; Delta HF Integrale	P	(Italy) Dario Cerrato	12
(Italy) Jolly Club	Lancia	Delta HF 4WD; Delta HF Integrale	P	(Switzerland) Chantal Galli	12
(France) Philips Renault Elf	Renault	11 Turbo	M	(France) Alain Oreille	1
(France) Philips Renault Elf	Renault	11 Turbo	M	(Portugal) Inverno Amaral	3
(France) Philips Renault Elf	Renault	11 Turbo	M	(Portugal) Bento Amaral	3
(France) Citroën Compétitions	Citroën	AX Sport	M	(France) Maurice Chomat	1–2, 5
(France) Citroën Compétitions	Citroën	AX Sport	M	(France) Dany Montagne	1, 3, 5, 12–13
(France) Citroën Compétitions	Citroën	AX Sport	M	(France) Denise Jacques	1, 3, 5, 12–13
(France) Citroën Compétitions	Citroën	AX Sport	M	(Portugal) Rufino Fontes	3
(France) Citroën Compétitions	Citroën	AX Sport	M	(France) Carole Vergnaud	3, 12–13
(France) Citroën Compétitions	Citroën	AX Sport	M	(France) Laurent Poggi	5
(France) Citroën Compétitions	Citroën	AX Sport	M	(San Marino) Massimo Ercolani	12
(France) Citroën Compétitions	Citroën	AX Sport	M	(United Kingdom) Terry Kaby	13
(Italy) Top Run SRL	Lancia	Delta HF 4WD; Delta HF Integrale	M P	(Italy) Giovanni del Zoppo	1, 3, 5–7, 10, 12
(Italy) Top Run SRL	Lancia	Delta HF 4WD; Delta HF Integrale	M P	(Argentina) Jorge Recalde	3, 5–7, 10, 12–13
(Italy) Top Run SRL	Lancia	Delta HF 4WD; Delta HF Integrale	M P	(San Marino) Massimo Ercolani	6, 10, 13
(Italy) Top Run SRL	Lancia	Delta HF 4WD; Delta HF Integrale	M P	(Sweden) Fredrik Skoghag	13
Peugeot France	Peugeot	205 GTI	M	(France) Jean-Pierre Ballet	1
(France) Simon Racing	Renault	5 GT Turbo	M	(France) Richard Frau	1, 5
(France) Simon Racing	Renault	5 GT Turbo	M	(France) Christophe Lapierre	1
(France) Simon Racing	Renault	5 GT Turbo	M	(France) Alain Oreille	5
(Germany) Audi Sport	Audi	Coupé Quattro; 200 Quattro; 90 Quattro	M	(Monaco) Christophe Spiliotis	1
(Germany) Audi Sport	Audi	Coupé Quattro; 200 Quattro; 90 Quattro	M	(Finland) Sebastian Lindholm	2–3, 6, 13
(Germany) Audi Sport	Audi	Coupé Quattro; 200 Quattro; 90 Quattro	M	(United Kingdom) David Llewellin	3
(Germany) Audi Sport	Audi	Coupé Quattro; 200 Quattro; 90 Quattro	M	(Austria) Georg Fischer	3, 7, 9
(Germany) Audi Sport	Audi	Coupé Quattro; 200 Quattro; 90 Quattro	M	(Austria) Rudi Stohl	4, 6, 9, 11
(Germany) Audi Sport	Audi	Coupé Quattro; 200 Quattro; 90 Quattro	M	(United States) John Buffum	7
(Germany) Audi Sport	Audi	Coupé Quattro; 200 Quattro; 90 Quattro	M	(New Zealand) Malcolm Stewart	8
(Germany) Audi Sport	Audi	Coupé Quattro; 200 Quattro; 90 Quattro	M	(Italy) Paola de Martini	12
(Germany) Audi Sport	Audi	Coupé Quattro; 200 Quattro; 90 Quattro	M	(Germany) Armin Schwarz	13
(United Kingdom) Ford Motor Co Ltd	Ford	Sierra RS Cosworth	M P	(Sweden) Stig Blomqvist	2–3, 10, 12–13
(United Kingdom) Ford Motor Co Ltd	Ford	Sierra RS Cosworth	M P	(France) Didier Auriol	3, 5, 10, 12
(United Kingdom) Ford Motor Co Ltd	Ford	Sierra RS Cosworth	M P	(Spain) Carlos Sainz	3, 5, 10, 12–13
(United Kingdom) Ford Motor Co Ltd	Ford	Sierra RS Cosworth	M P	(Portugal) Joaquim Santos	3
(United Kingdom) Ford Motor Co Ltd	Ford	Sierra RS Cosworth	M P	(Kenya) John Hellier	4
(United Kingdom) Ford Motor Co Ltd	Ford	Sierra RS Cosworth	M P	(France) Pierre-César Baroni	5
(United Kingdom) Ford Motor Co Ltd	Ford	Sierra RS Cosworth	M P	(Italy) Gianfranco Cunico	12
(United Kingdom) Ford Motor Co Ltd	Ford	Sierra RS Cosworth	M P	(United Kingdom) David Llewellin	13
(United Kingdom) Ford Motor Co Ltd	Ford	Sierra RS Cosworth	M P	(United Kingdom) Mark Lovell	13
(United Kingdom) GM Euro Sport	Opel Vauxhall	Kadett GSI 16V; Astra GTE	M	(Sweden) Mats Jonsson	2, 10, 13
(United Kingdom) GM Euro Sport	Opel Vauxhall	Kadett GSI 16V; Astra GTE	M	(United Kingdom) Malcolm Wilson	2, 6, 13
(United Kingdom) GM Euro Sport	Opel Vauxhall	Kadett GSI 16V; Astra GTE	M	(Sweden) Björn Johansson	2
(United Kingdom) GM Euro Sport	Opel Vauxhall	Kadett GSI 16V; Astra GTE	M	(Sweden) Håkan Eriksson	2
(United Kingdom) GM Euro Sport	Opel Vauxhall	Kadett GSI 16V; Astra GTE	M	(Finland) Hannu Mikkola	4
(United Kingdom) GM Euro Sport	Opel Vauxhall	Kadett GSI 16V; Astra GTE	M	(Austria) Sepp Haider	4, 8
(United Kingdom) GM Euro Sport	Opel Vauxhall	Kadett GSI 16V; Astra GTE	M	(United Kingdom) Derek Bell	13
(United Kingdom) GM Euro Sport	Opel Vauxhall	Kadett GSI 16V; Astra GTE	M	(United Kingdom) David Metcalfe	13
(United Kingdom) GM Euro Sport	Opel Vauxhall	Kadett GSI 16V; Astra GTE	M	(United Kingdom) Chris Birkbeck	13
(Germany) Volkswagen Motorsport	Volkswagen	Golf GTI 16V	P	(Germany) Erwin Weber	3–4
(Germany) Volkswagen Motorsport	Volkswagen	Golf GTI 16V	P	(Sweden) Lars-Erik Torph	4
(Germany) Volkswagen Motorsport	Volkswagen	Golf GTI 16V	P	(Greece) Konstantinos Apostolou	6, 13
(Germany) Volkswagen Motorsport	Volkswagen	Golf GTI 16V	P	(Austria) Raimund Baumschlager	12
(Japan) Toyota Team Europe	Toyota	Supra Turbo; Celica GT-Four ST165	P	(Sweden) Kenneth Eriksson	4–5, 10, 12–13
(Japan) Toyota Team Europe	Toyota	Supra Turbo; Celica GT-Four ST165	P	(Finland) Juha Kankkunen	4–6, 10, 12–13
(Japan) Toyota Team Europe	Toyota	Supra Turbo; Celica GT-Four ST165	P	(Sweden) Björn Waldegård	4, 6, 13
(Japan) Toyota Team Europe	Toyota	Supra Turbo; Celica GT-Four ST165	P	(United Kingdom) Jimmy McRae	13
(Japan) Nissan Motorsports International	Nissan	200SX	D	(Sweden) Per Eklund	4
(Japan) Nissan Motorsports International	Nissan	200SX	D	(France) Alain Ambrosino	4, 11
(Japan) Nissan Motorsports International	Nissan	200SX	D	(Kenya) Mike Kirkland	4
(Japan) Nissan Motorsports International	Nissan	200SX	D	(Kenya) Jayant Shah	4
(Japan) Nissan Motorsports International	Nissan	200SX	D	(Greece) Stratis Hatzipanayiotou	6
(Japan) Nissan Motorsports International	Nissan	200SX	D	(Belgium) Flory Roothaert	6
(Japan) Nissan Motorsports International	Nissan	200SX	D	(New Zealand) Paddy Davidson	8
(Japan) Fuji Heavy Industries	Subaru	RX Turbo	D	(New Zealand) Peter 'Possum' Bourne	4, 8
(Japan) Fuji Heavy Industries	Subaru	RX Turbo	D	(Kenya) Ian Duncan	4
(Japan) Fuji Heavy Industries	Subaru	RX Turbo	D	(Kenya) Patrick Njiru	4
(Japan) Fuji Heavy Industries	Subaru	RX Turbo	D	(Chile) José Celsi	9
(France) Bastos Motul BMW	BMW	M3	P	(France) Bernard Béguin	5
(France) Bastos Motul BMW	BMW	M3	P	(France) François Chatriot	5
(France) Bastos Motul BMW	BMW	M3	P	(Belgium) Marc Duez	5
(France) Bastos Motul BMW	BMW	M3	P	(Finland) Ari Vatanen	10
(France) Bastos Motul BMW	BMW	M3	P	(Italy) Andrea Zanussi	12
(France) Gema Racing	Alfa Romeo	75 V6	P	(France) Paul Rouby	5
(France) Gema Racing	Alfa Romeo	75 V6	P	(France) Jacques Panciatici	5
(Japan) Suzuki Sport	Suzuki	Cultus GTI	Y	(New Zealand) Alan Carter	7
(Japan) Suzuki Sport	Suzuki	Cultus GTI	Y	(Japan) Nobuhiro Tajima	7
(Japan) Mitsubishi Ralliart Europe	Mitsubishi	Galant VR-4	M	(Japan) Kenjiro Shinozuka	8, 13
(Japan) Mitsubishi Ralliart Europe	Mitsubishi	Galant VR-4	M	(Finland) Ari Vatanen	13
Lancia Rally Team Austria	Lancia	Delta HF Integrale	M	(Austria) Franz Wittmann	9

== Events ==
1988 World Rally Championship event map
Black = Tarmac	Brown = Gravel	Blue = Snow/Ice	Red = Mixed Surface

1988 World Rally Championship schedule and results
Round	Rally name	Stages	Podium finishers					
Round	Rally name	Stages	Rank	Driver	Co-driver	Team	Car	Time
1	(Monaco) Rallye Monte Carlo (16–21 January)	26 stages 624 km Tarmac	1	(France) Bruno Saby	(France) Jean-François Fauchille	(Italy) Martini Lancia	Lancia Delta HF 4WD	7:19.11
1	(Monaco) Rallye Monte Carlo (16–21 January)	26 stages 624 km Tarmac	2	(Italy) Alex Fiorio	(Italy) Luigi Pirollo	(Italy) Jolly Club	Lancia Delta HF 4WD	7:30.01
1	(Monaco) Rallye Monte Carlo (16–21 January)	26 stages 624 km Tarmac	3	(France) Jean-Pierre Ballet	(France) Marie-Christine Lallement	Peugeot France	Peugeot 205 GTI	7:42.46
2	(Sweden) Swedish Rally (4–6 February)	35 stages 491 km Snow/Ice	1	(Finland) Markku Alén	(Finland) Ilkka Kivimäki	(Italy) Martini Lancia	Lancia Delta HF 4WD	5:02.31
2	(Sweden) Swedish Rally (4–6 February)	35 stages 491 km Snow/Ice	2	(Sweden) Stig Blomqvist	(Sweden) Benny Melander	Rallysport Sweden	Ford Sierra XR 4x4	5:04.08
2	(Sweden) Swedish Rally (4–6 February)	35 stages 491 km Snow/Ice	3	(Sweden) Lars-Erik Torph	(Sweden) Tina Thörner	Team VAG Sweden	Audi Coupé Quattro	5:10.03
3	Rallye de Portugal (1–6 March)	37 stages 589 km Gravel/Tarmac	1	(Italy) Miki Biasion	(Italy) Carlo Cassina	(Italy) Martini Lancia	Lancia Delta HF Integrale	6:44.01
3	Rallye de Portugal (1–6 March)	37 stages 589 km Gravel/Tarmac	2	(Italy) Alex Fiorio	(Italy) Luigi Pirollo	(Italy) Jolly Club	Lancia Delta HF 4WD	6:52.47
3	Rallye de Portugal (1–6 March)	37 stages 589 km Gravel/Tarmac	3	(France) Yves Loubet	(France) Jean-Bernard Vieu	(Italy) Jolly Club	Lancia Delta HF 4WD	6:53.23
4	(Kenya) Safari Rally (31 March – 4 April)	82 controls 4205 km Gravel	1	(Italy) Miki Biasion	(Italy) Tiziano Siviero	(Italy) Martini Lancia	Lancia Delta HF Integrale	2:51.04
4	(Kenya) Safari Rally (31 March – 4 April)	82 controls 4205 km Gravel	2	(Kenya) Mike Kirkland	(Kenya) Robin Nixon	(Japan) Nissan Motorsports International	Nissan 200SX	3:03.57
4	(Kenya) Safari Rally (31 March – 4 April)	82 controls 4205 km Gravel	3	(Sweden) Per Eklund	(United Kingdom) Dave Whittock	(Japan) Nissan Motorsports International	Nissan 200SX	3:38.26
5	(France) Tour de Corse (3–6 May)	30 stages 623 km Tarmac	1	(France) Didier Auriol	(France) Bernard Occelli	(United Kingdom) Ford Motor Co Ltd	Ford Sierra RS Cosworth	7:12.04
5	(France) Tour de Corse (3–6 May)	30 stages 623 km Tarmac	2	(France) Yves Loubet	(France) Jean-Bernard Vieu	(Italy) Martini Lancia	Lancia Delta HF Integrale	7:15.09
5	(France) Tour de Corse (3–6 May)	30 stages 623 km Tarmac	3	(France) Bruno Saby	(France) Jean-François Fauchille	(Italy) Martini Lancia	Lancia Delta HF Integrale	7:16:53
6	(Greece) Acropolis Rally (29 May – 1 June)	36 stages 526 km Gravel	1	(Italy) Miki Biasion	(Italy) Tiziano Siviero	(Italy) Martini Lancia	Lancia Delta HF Integrale	7:03.00
6	(Greece) Acropolis Rally (29 May – 1 June)	36 stages 526 km Gravel	2	(Sweden) Mikael Ericsson	(Sweden) Claes Billstam	(Italy) Martini Lancia	Lancia Delta HF Integrale	7:04.43
6	(Greece) Acropolis Rally (29 May – 1 June)	36 stages 526 km Gravel	3	(Italy) Alex Fiorio	(Italy) Luigi Pirollo	(Italy) Jolly Club	Lancia Delta HF Integrale	7:10.40
7	(United States) Olympus Rally (23–26 June)	36 stages 502 km Gravel	1	(Italy) Miki Biasion	(Italy) Tiziano Siviero	(Italy) Martini Lancia	Lancia Delta HF Integrale	5:28.44
7	(United States) Olympus Rally (23–26 June)	36 stages 502 km Gravel	2	(Italy) Alex Fiorio	(Italy) Luigi Pirollo	(Italy) Jolly Club	Lancia Delta HF Integrale	5:34.07
7	(United States) Olympus Rally (23–26 June)	36 stages 502 km Gravel	3	(United States) John Buffum	(Canada) John Bellefleur	(United States) Audi of America	Audi Coupé Quattro	5:44.59
8	Rally New Zealand (9–12 July)	39 stages 611 km Gravel	1	(Austria) Sepp Haider	(Austria) Ferdi Hinterleitner	(United Kingdom) GM Euro Sport	Opel Kadett GSI 16V	7:38.39
8	Rally New Zealand (9–12 July)	39 stages 611 km Gravel	2	(New Zealand) Ray Wilson	(New Zealand) Stuart Lewis	(New Zealand) Mobil 1 Racing	Mazda 323 4WD	7:57.16
8	Rally New Zealand (9–12 July)	39 stages 611 km Gravel	3	(New Zealand) Malcolm Stewart	(New Zealand) John Kennard	Audi Sport New Zealand	Audi Coupe Quattro	8:02.25
9	Rally Argentina (2–6 August)	29 stages 588 km Gtavel	1	(Argentina) Jorge Recalde	(Argentina) Jorge del Buono	(Italy) Martini Lancia	Lancia Delta HF Integrale	7:05.16
9	Rally Argentina (2–6 August)	29 stages 588 km Gtavel	2	(Italy) Miki Biasion	(Italy) Tiziano Siviero	(Italy) Martini Lancia	Lancia Delta HF Integrale	7:08.51
9	Rally Argentina (2–6 August)	29 stages 588 km Gtavel	3	(Austria) Franz Wittmann	(Austria) Jörg Pattermann	Lancia Rally Team Austria	Lancia Delta HF Integrale	7:34.13
10	(Finland) 1000 Lakes Rally (26–28 August)	39 stages 496 km Gravel	1	(Finland) Markku Alén	(Finland) Ilkka Kivimäki	(Italy) Martini Lancia	Lancia Delta HF Integrale	4:35.29
10	(Finland) 1000 Lakes Rally (26–28 August)	39 stages 496 km Gravel	2	(Sweden) Mikael Ericsson	(Sweden) Claes Billstam	(Italy) Martini Lancia	Lancia Delta HF Integrale	4:38.24
10	(Finland) 1000 Lakes Rally (26–28 August)	39 stages 496 km Gravel	3	(France) Didier Auriol	(France) Bernard Occelli	(United Kingdom) Ford Motor Co Ltd	Ford Sierra RS Cosworth	4:45.15
11	(Ivory Coast) Rallye Côte d'Ivoire (20–24 September)	80 controls 3421 km Gravel	1	(France) Alain Ambrosino	(France) Daniel Le Saux	(Japan) Nissan Motorsports International	Nissan 200SX	+3:34.51 pen
11	(Ivory Coast) Rallye Côte d'Ivoire (20–24 September)	80 controls 3421 km Gravel	2	(Belgium) Pascal Gaban	(Belgium) Willy Lux	Mazda Rally Team Belgium	Mazda 323 4WD	+5:06.33 pen
11	(Ivory Coast) Rallye Côte d'Ivoire (20–24 September)	80 controls 3421 km Gravel	3	(France) Patrick Tauziac	(France) Claude Papin	(Japan) Ralliart	Mitsubishi Starion Turbo	+7:20.20 pen
12	(Italy) Rallye Sanremo (10–14 October)	39 stages 531 km Tarmac/Gravel	1	(Italy) Miki Biasion	(Italy) Tiziano Siviero	(Italy) Martini Lancia	Lancia Delta HF Integrale	6:06.41
12	(Italy) Rallye Sanremo (10–14 October)	39 stages 531 km Tarmac/Gravel	2	(Italy) Alex Fiorio	(Italy) Luigi Pirollo	(Italy) Jolly Club	Lancia Delta HF Integrale	6:07.34
12	(Italy) Rallye Sanremo (10–14 October)	39 stages 531 km Tarmac/Gravel	3	(Italy) Dario Cerrato	(Italy) Giuseppe Cerri	(Italy) Jolly Club	Lancia Delta HF Integrale	6:08.35
13	(United Kingdom) RAC Rally (20–24 November)	52 stages 602 km Tarmac/Gravel	1	(Finland) Markku Alén	(Finland) Ilkka Kivimäki	(Italy) Martini Lancia	Lancia Delta HF Integrale	7:15.37
13	(United Kingdom) RAC Rally (20–24 November)	52 stages 602 km Tarmac/Gravel	2	(Finland) Timo Salonen	(Finland) Voitto Silander	(Japan) Mazda Rally Team Europe	Mazda 323 4WD	7:19.43
13	(United Kingdom) RAC Rally (20–24 November)	52 stages 602 km Tarmac/Gravel	3	(Sweden) Björn Waldegård	(United Kingdom) Fred Gallagher	(Japan) Toyota Team Europe	Toyota Celica GT-Four ST165	7:22.16

== Championship for manufacturers ==
1988 World Rally Championship for Manufacturers
Rank	Manufacturers	Event											Total points
Rank	Manufacturers	(Monaco) MON	(Sweden) SWE	(Portugal) POR	(Kenya) KEN	(France) FRA	(Greece) GRC	(United States) USA	(Argentina) ARG	(Finland) FIN	(Italy) ITA	(United Kingdom) GBR	Total points
1	(Italy) Lancia	(20)	(20)	(20)	20	(17)	20	20	20	20	20	20	140
2	(United States) Ford	–	17	10	–	20	–	–	–	14	10	8	79
3	(Germany) Audi	7	14	–	4	–	10	14	12	(2)	(2)	10	71
4	(Japan) Mazda	10	–	12	–	–	9	6	–	12	–	17	66
5	(Japan) Toyota	–	–	–	12	8	–	–	4	–	8	14	46
6	(France) Renault	12	–	4	–	8	–	–	8	–	–	–	32
7	(Germany) BMW	13	–	–	–	12	–	–	–	–	–	–	25
8	(Japan) Nissan	–	–	–	17	–	6	–	–	–	–	–	23
9	(Japan) Subaru	–	–	–	8	–	–	–	10	–	–	–	18
10	(France) Peugeot	14	–	–	–	–	–	–	–	–	–	1	15
11	(Germany) Volkswagen	–	–	6	–	–	4	–	–	–	4	–	14
12	(Germany) Opel	–	10	–	–	–	–	–	–	1	–	2	13
13	(Japan) Suzuki	–	–	–	–	–	–	8	1	–	–	–	9
14	(Japan) Mitsubishi	–	–	–	–	–	–	7	–	–	–	–	7
15	(Italy) Alfa Romeo	–	–	–	–	4	–	–	–	–	–	–	4
16	(Italy) Fiat	–	–	–	–	–	–	–	2	–	–	–	2

== Championship for drivers ==
1988 World Rally Championship for Drivers
Rank	Driver	Event													Total points
Rank	Driver	(Monaco) MON	(Sweden) SWE	(Portugal) POR	(Kenya) KEN	(France) FRA	(Greece) GRC	(United States) USA	(New Zealand) NZL	(Argentina) ARG	(Finland) FIN	(Ivory Coast) CIV	(Italy) ITA	(United Kingdom) GBR	Total points
1	(Italy) Miki Biasion	–	–	20	20	–	20	20	–	15	–	–	20	–	115
2	(Finland) Markku Alén	–	20	6	–	–	10	–	–	–	20	–	10	20	86
3	(Italy) Alex Fiorio	15	–	15	–	–	12	15	–	–	4	–	15	–	76
4	(Sweden) Stig Blomqvist	–	15	8	–	–	–	–	–	–	8	–	4	6	41
5	(Finland) Timo Salonen	8	–	–	–	–	–	–	–	–	10	–	–	15	33
6	(France) Bruno Saby	20	–	–	–	12	–	–	–	–	–	–	–	–	32
6	(France) Didier Auriol	–	–	–	–	20	–	–	–	–	12	–	–	–	32
8	(Sweden) Mikael Ericsson	–	–	–	–	–	15	–	–	–	15	–	–	–	30
9	(Argentina) Jorge Recalde	–	–	1	–	–	–	6	–	20	–	–	–	–	27
10	(France) Yves Loubet	–	–	12	–	15	–	–	–	–	–	–	–	–	27
11	(Spain) Carlos Sainz	–	–	–	–	8	–	–	–	–	6	–	8	4	26
12	(Sweden) Kenneth Eriksson	–	–	–	10	6	–	–	–	–	–	–	6	–	22
13	(Austria) Rudi Stohl	–	–	–	3	–	8	–	–	10	–	–	–	–	21
14	(Austria) Sepp Haider	–	–	–	–	–	–	–	20	–	–	–	–	–	20
14	(France) Alain Ambrosino	–	–	–	–	–	–	–	–	–	–	20	–	–	20
16	(Belgium) Pascal Gaban	–	–	–	–	–	1	–	–	–	–	15	–	–	16
17	(Sweden) Björn Waldegård	–	–	–	4	–	–	–	–	–	–	–	–	12	16
18	(Kenya) Mike Kirkland	–	–	–	15	–	–	–	–	–	–	–	–	–	15
18	(New Zealand) Ray Wilson	–	–	–	–	–	–	–	15	–	–	–	–	–	15
20	(France) Jean-Pierre Ballet	12	–	–	–	–	–	–	–	–	–	–	–	–	12
20	(Sweden) Lars-Erik Torph	–	12	–	–	–	–	–	–	–	–	–	–	–	12
20	(Sweden) Per Eklund	–	–	–	12	–	–	–	–	–	–	–	–	–	12
20	(United States) John Buffum	–	–	–	–	–	–	12	–	–	–	–	–	–	12
20	(New Zealand) Malcolm Stewart	–	–	–	–	–	–	–	12	–	–	–	–	–	12
20	(Austria) Franz Wittmann Sr.	–	–	–	–	–	–	–	–	12	–	–	–	–	12
20	(France) Patrick Tauziac	–	–	–	–	–	–	–	–	–	–	12	–	–	12
20	(Italy) Dario Cerrato	–	–	–	–	–	–	–	–	–	–	–	12	–	12
28	(France) Alain Oreille	10	–	–	–	1	–	–	–	–	–	–	–	–	11
29	(Italy) Giovanni Del Zoppo	3	–	–	–	–	–	8	–	–	–	–	–	–	11
30	(Sweden) Erik Johansson	–	10	–	–	–	–	–	–	–	–	–	–	–	10
30	(Finland) Hannu Mikkola	–	–	10	–	–	–	–	–	–	–	–	–	–	10
30	(France) François Chatriot	–	–	–	–	10	–	–	–	–	–	–	–	–	10
30	(Austria) Georg Fischer	–	–	–	–	–	–	10	–	–	–	–	–	–	10
30	(Australia) David Officer	–	–	–	–	–	–	–	10	–	–	–	–	–	10
30	(France) Alain Oudit	–	–	–	–	–	–	–	–	–	–	10	–	–	10
30	(Finland) Pentti Airikkala	–	–	–	–	–	–	–	–	–	–	–	–	10	10
37	(Sweden) Håkan Eriksson	–	8	–	–	–	–	–	–	–	–	–	–	–	8
37	(Finland) Juha Kankkunen	–	–	–	8	–	–	–	–	–	–	–	–	–	8
37	(New Zealand) Ross Meekings	–	–	–	–	–	–	–	8	–	–	–	–	–	8
37	(Chile) José Celsi	–	–	–	–	–	–	–	–	8	–	–	–	–	8
37	(France) Adolphe Choteau	–	–	–	–	–	–	–	–	–	–	8	–	–	8
37	(Germany) Armin Schwarz	–	–	–	–	–	–	–	–	–	–	–	–	8	8
43	(France) François Chauche	6	–	–	–	–	–	–	–	–	–	–	–	–	6
43	(Sweden) Björn Johansson	–	6	–	–	–	–	–	–	–	–	–	–	–	6
43	(Kenya) Ian Duncan	–	–	–	6	–	–	–	–	–	–	–	–	–	6
43	(Greece) Jigger	–	–	–	–	–	6	–	–	–	–	–	–	–	6
43	(New Zealand) Marty Roestenburg	–	–	–	–	–	–	–	6	–	–	–	–	–	6
43	(Argentina) Juan Maria Traverso	–	–	–	–	–	–	–	–	6	–	–	–	–	6
43	(Belgium) Didier Monin	–	–	–	–	–	–	–	–	–	–	6	–	–	6
50	(Monaco) Christophe Spiliotis	4	–	–	–	–	–	–	–	–	–	–	–	–	4
50	(Sweden) Bror Danielsson	–	4	–	–	–	–	–	–	–	–	–	–	–	4
50	(West Germany) Erwin Weber	–	–	4	–	–	–	–	–	–	–	–	–	–	4
50	(France) Bernard Béguin	–	–	–	–	4	–	–	–	–	–	–	–	–	4
50	(Greece) Stratissino	–	–	–	–	–	4	–	–	–	–	–	–	–	4
50	(Japan) Nobuhiro Tajima	–	–	–	–	–	–	4	–	–	–	–	–	–	4
50	(New Zealand) Joe McAndrew	–	–	–	–	–	–	–	4	–	–	–	–	–	4
50	(Argentina) Marcelo Raies	–	–	–	–	–	–	–	–	4	–	–	–	–	4
50	(Italy) Roberto Ambrosoli	–	–	–	–	–	–	–	–	–	–	4	–	–	4
59	(United Kingdom) Malcolm Wilson	–	3	–	–	–	–	–	–	–	–	–	–	–	3
59	(Portugal) Inverno Amaral	–	–	3	–	–	–	–	–	–	–	–	–	–	3
59	(France) Paul Rouby	–	–	–	–	3	–	–	–	–	–	–	–	–	3
59	(Greece) Kóstas Apostolou	–	–	–	–	–	3	–	–	–	–	–	–	–	3
59	(New Zealand) Rod Millen	–	–	–	–	–	–	3	–	–	–	–	–	–	3
59	(Japan) Tetsuo Sano	–	–	–	–	–	–	–	3	–	–	–	–	–	3
59	(Chile) Claudio Israel	–	–	–	–	–	–	–	–	3	–	–	–	–	3
59	(Sweden) Harry Joki	–	–	–	–	–	–	–	–	–	3	–	–	–	3
59	(Ivory Coast) Soumare Mafell	–	–	–	–	–	–	–	–	–	–	3	–	–	3
59	(Austria) Raimund Baumschlager	–	–	–	–	–	–	–	–	–	–	–	3	–	3
59	(Sweden) Stig-Olov Walfridsson	–	–	–	–	–	–	–	–	–	–	–	–	3	3
70	(Sweden) Tomas Jansson	–	1	–	–	–	–	–	–	–	2	–	–	–	3
70	(Sweden) Mats Jonsson	–	–	–	–	–	–	–	–	–	1	–	–	2	3
72	(France) Pierre Bos	2	–	–	–	–	–	–	–	–	–	–	–	–	2
72	(Finland) Sebastian Lindholm	–	2	–	–	–	–	–	–	–	–	–	–	–	2
72	(Portugal) Carlos Bica	–	–	2	–	–	–	–	–	–	–	–	–	–	2
72	(New Zealand) 'Possum' Bourne	–	–	–	2	–	–	–	–	–	–	–	–	–	2
72	(France) César Baroni	–	–	–	–	2	–	–	–	–	–	–	–	–	2
72	(Belgium) Flory Roothaert	–	–	–	–	–	2	–	–	–	–	–	–	–	2
72	(New Zealand) Alan Carter	–	–	–	–	–	–	2	–	–	–	–	–	–	2
72	(New Zealand) Dave Strong	–	–	–	–	–	–	–	2	–	–	–	–	–	2
72	(Argentina) José Luis Grasso	–	–	–	–	–	–	–	–	2	–	–	–	–	2
72	(Ivory Coast) Michel Molinie	–	–	–	–	–	–	–	–	–	–	2	–	–	2
72	(Italy) Paola De Martini	–	–	–	–	–	–	–	–	–	–	–	2	–	2
83	(France) Richard Frau	1	–	–	–	–	–	–	–	–	–	–	–	–	1
83	(Kenya) Jim Heather-Hayes	–	–	–	1	–	–	–	–	–	–	–	–	–	1
83	(Hong Kong) Michael Lieu	–	–	–	–	–	–	1	–	–	–	–	–	–	1
83	(New Zealand) Murray Walker	–	–	–	–	–	–	–	1	–	–	–	–	–	1
83	(Chile) Fernando Urrutia	–	–	–	–	–	–	–	–	1	–	–	–	–	1
83	(Ivory Coast) Samir Assef	–	–	–	–	–	–	–	–	–	–	1	–	–	1
83	(Italy) Paolo Alessandrini	–	–	–	–	–	–	–	–	–	–	–	1	–	1
83	(Sweden) Kalle Grundel	–	–	–	–	–	–	–	–	–	–	–	–	1	1

1988 World Rally Championship point awards for drivers
Points awarded by finish	1st	2nd	3rd	4th	5th	6th	7th	8th	9th	10th
Points awarded by finish	20	15	12	10	8	6	4	3	2	1

== Cup for production car drivers ==
1988 FIA Cup for Drivers of Production Cars
Rank	Driver	Event													Total points
Rank	Driver	(Monaco) MON	(Sweden) SWE	(Portugal) POR	(Kenya) KEN	(France) FRA	(Greece) GRC	(United States) USA	(New Zealand) NZL	(Argentina) ARG	(Finland) FIN	(Ivory Coast) CIV	(Italy) ITA	(United Kingdom) GBR	Total points
1	(Belgium) Pascal Gaban	–	–	10	–	–	13	–	–	–	–	13	7	2	45
2	(Argentina) Jorge Recalde	–	–	13	–	–	–	10	–	–	13	–	–	7	43
3	(Italy) Giovanni Del Zoppo	10	–	–	–	–	–	13	–	–	7	–	–	–	30
4	(Belgium) Grégoire de Mévius	–	–	–	–	–	–	–	–	–	3	–	–	13	16
5	(San Marino) Massimo Ercolani	–	5	–	–	–	–	–	–	–	5	–	–	5	15
6	(France) François Chauche	13	–	–	–	–	–	–	–	–	–	–	–	–	13
6	(Sweden) Sören Nilsson	–	13	–	–	–	–	–	–	–	–	–	–	–	13
6	(France) César Baroni	–	–	–	–	13	–	–	–	–	–	–	–	–	13
6	(New Zealand) Dave Strong	–	–	–	–	–	–	–	13	–	–	–	–	–	13
6	(Italy) Andrea Aghini	–	–	–	–	–	–	–	–	–	–	–	13	–	13
11	(France) Richard Frau	7	–	–	–	5	–	–	–	–	–	–	–	–	12

== See also ==
- 1988 in sports
