= Alex Fiorio =

Italian rally driver (1965–2026)

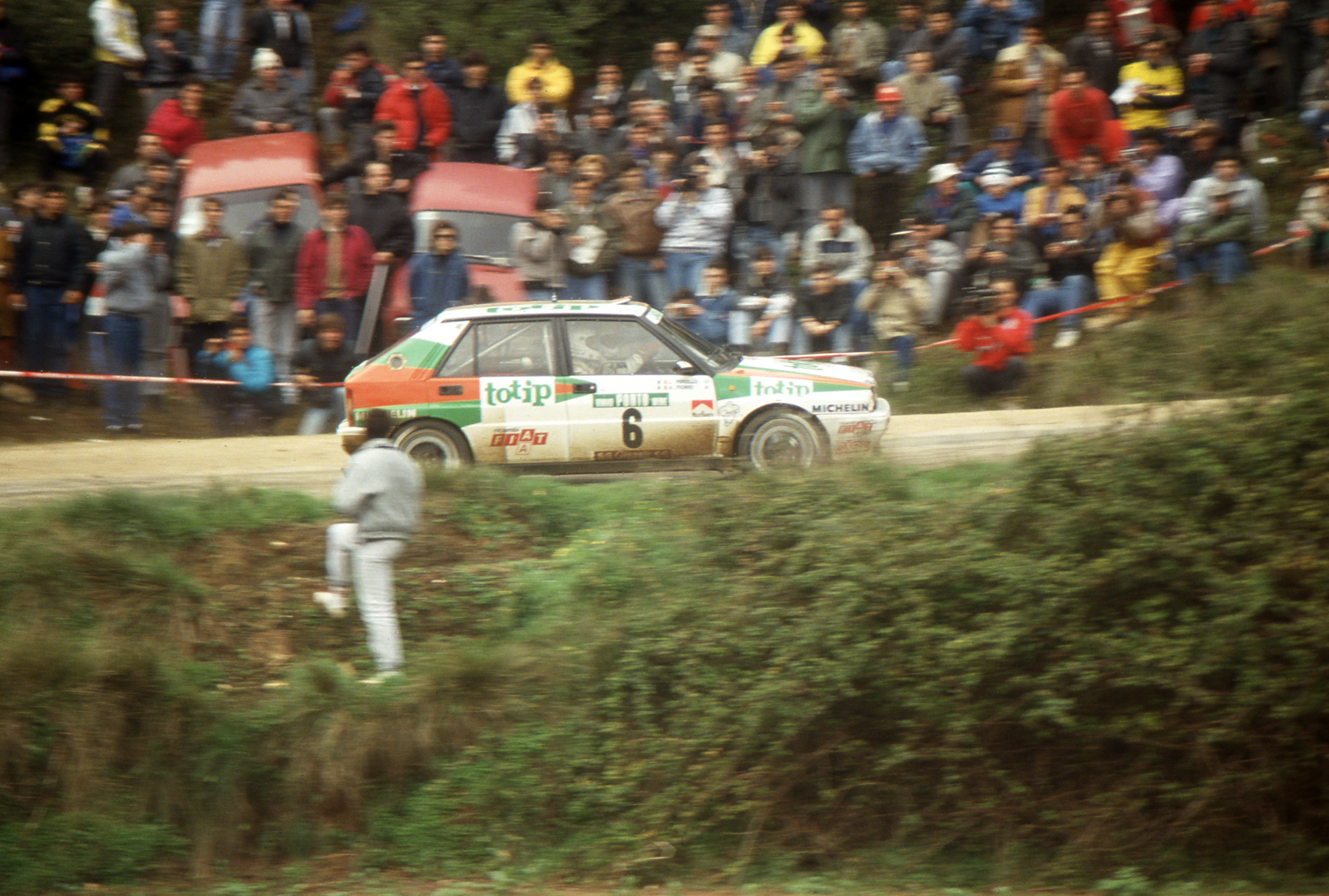
- Fiorio racing in the 1989 Rally de Portugal

Personal information
- Nationality: (Italy) Italian
- Full name: Alessandro Fiorio
- Born: 10 March 1965; Turin, Italy
- Died: 17 August 2026 (aged 61); Ceglie Messapica, Italy

World Rally Championship record
- Years active: 1986–1995, 2000–2002
- Co-driver: (Italy) Luigi Pirollo (Italy) Arles Montenesi (Italy) Giacomo Luchi (Italy) Vittorio Brambilla (Italy) Enrico Cantoni
- Teams: Jolly Club, Lancia, Astra Racing, Ralliart Italia
- Rallies: 51
- Championships: 0
- Rally wins: 0
- Podiums: 10
- Stage wins: 45
- Total points: 236
- First rally: 1986 Monte Carlo Rally
- Last rally: 2002 Rally Australia

Alessandro "Alex" Fiorio (10 March 1965 – 17 August 2026) was an Italian rally driver. He debuted in the World Rally Championship in 1986. Driving the dominant Lancia Delta Integrale for the Lancia "B-team" Jolly Club, he finished third in the drivers' world championship in 1988 and second in 1989. His father Cesare Fiorio was a former racer, founder and team manager of Lancia HF Squadra Corse and sporting director for Scuderia Ferrari.

== Career ==
=== Jolly Club (1986–1990) ===
Fiorio began his World Rally Championship career in 1986, competing for the Jolly Club team in five WRC events in a Fiat Uno Turbo. He retired in his first four rallies and then finished seventh at his home event, the Rallye Sanremo, where the stewards controversially disqualified the French Peugeot team and handed victory to home country's Lancia. As the FIA later annulled the results of the whole event, Fiorio lost his first drivers' championship points. In the 1987 season, Fiorio continued with Jolly Club and competed in a Group N Lancia Delta HF 4WD in six events. He took three wins in the production car class, and won the inaugural FIA Group N Cup (now the Production World Rally Championship). At the Rallye Sanremo, he competed with a Group A Delta HF 4WD and finished seventh overall, taking his first WRC points.

In 1988, Fiorio drove a Delta Integrale in the WRC. He finished second at the Monte Carlo Rally, the Rally Portugal, the Olympus Rally and the Rallye Sanremo, and took third place at the Acropolis Rally in Greece, each time losing the win to fellow Delta drivers. These results placed him third in the drivers' world championship, behind Lancia factory team drivers Miki Biasion and Markku Alén.

Fiorio's 1989 season started with a bad accident at the Monte Carlo Rally. He lost control of his Delta Integrale on the fifth stage, and crashed into the crowd at about 145 km/h (90 mph), killing two spectators – Swedish rally driver Lars-Erik Torph and his co-driver Bertil-Rune Rehnfeldt – and injuring three others. Fiorio and his co-driver Luigi Pirollo were unhurt. Fiorio went on to finish second in Argentina and Sanremo, third in Portugal and Greece and fourth at a new WRC round, the Rally Australia. With 65 points, he placed second in the drivers' championship, behind Biasion and ahead of Toyota's Juha Kankkunen. In 1990, Fiorio drove to his last podium finish with a Lancia factory team Delta Integrale 16V in Australia. With three other points-scoring finishes to his name, he placed ninth in the drivers' championship.

=== Later career ===
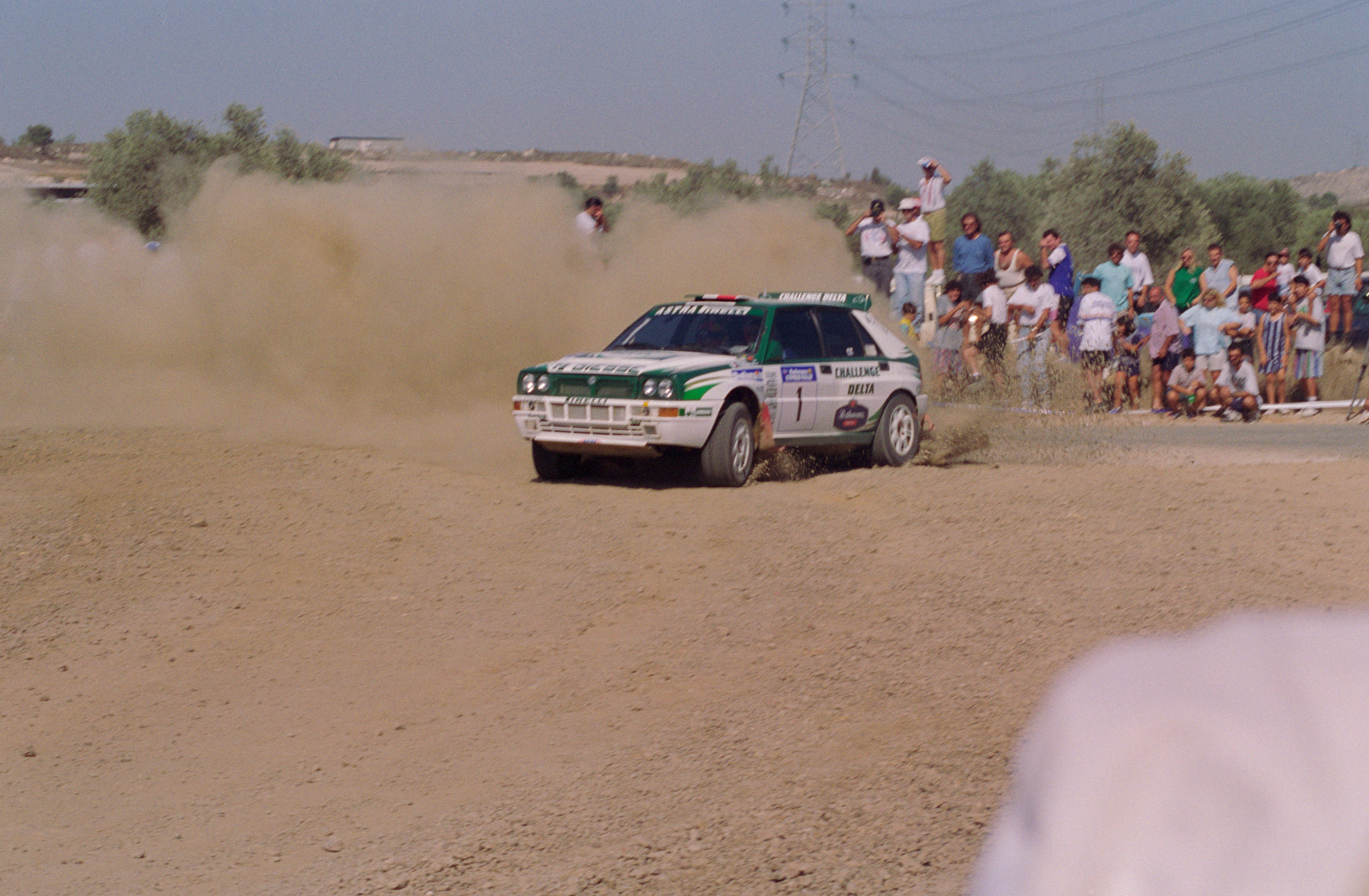
Alex Fiorio with co-driver Vittorio Brambilla at the Rothmans Cyprus Rally 1994 (ERC). Driving a Lancia Delta HF Integrale.

In 1991, Fiorio drove a Ford Sierra RS Cosworth 4x4 in four events with ninth place in Sanremo as his best result. The 1992 season saw him return to the wheel of a Delta Integrale with the Astra Racing team. He finished fourth at the Rally Argentina and at the Rally Catalunya, fifth at the Rallye Sanremo and seventh at the Acropolis Rally. Fiorio then continued with Astra in the 1993 season again competing in four selected events. His best result was fifth in Catalunya. In 1994, Fiorio competed in only two WRC events, retiring with a Ford Escort RS Cosworth in Portugal and taking fourth place with a Delta HF Integrale at the Acropolis Rally. In the European Rally Championship (ERC), he won the Cyprus Rally for the third year in a row. In his only world rally in 1995, he took his Escort RS Cosworth to eighth place in Portugal.

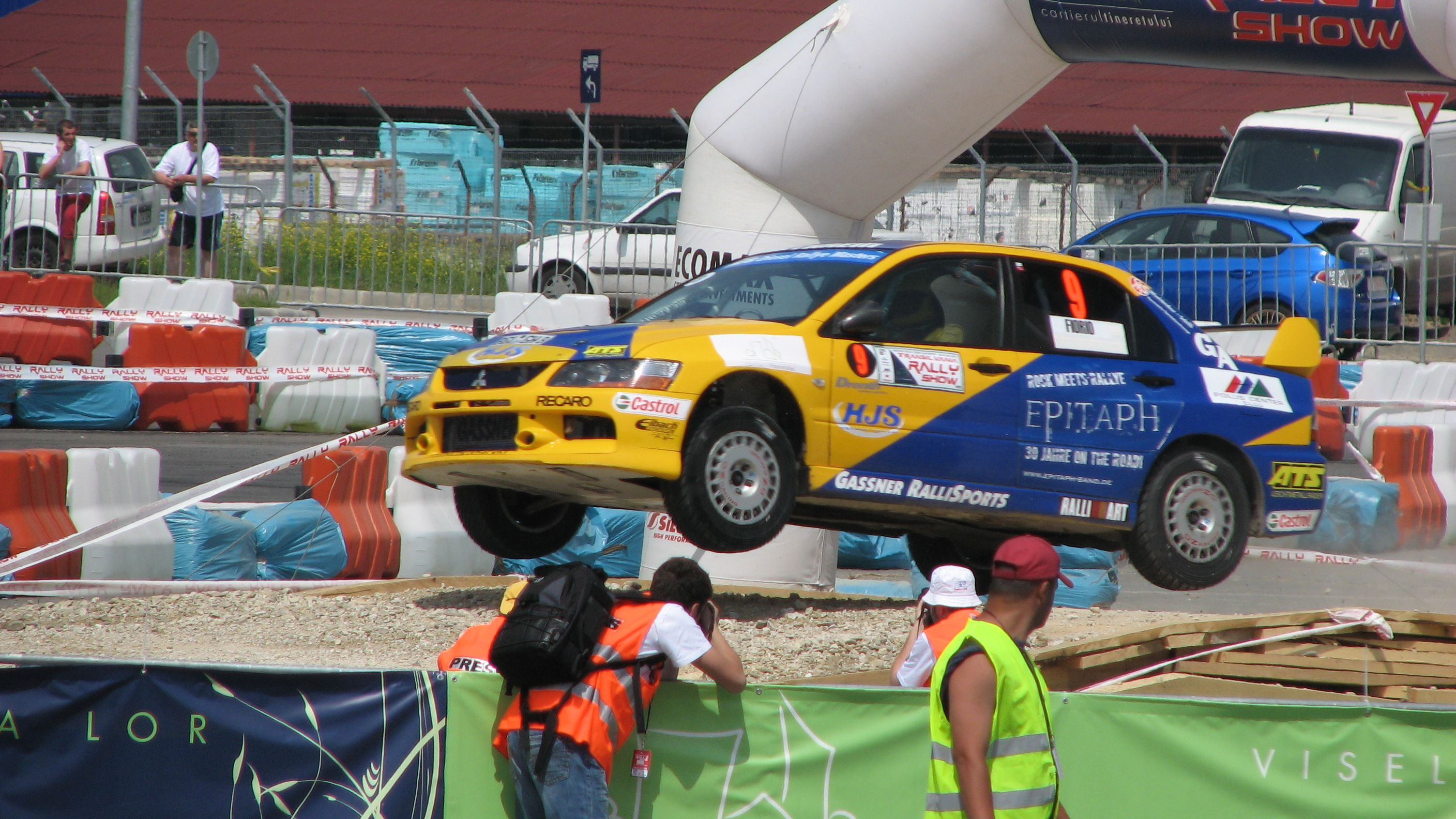
Fiorio driving a Mitsubishi Lancer Evolution at the Transilvania Rally Show in 2008.

After making a comeback to the WRC by competing at his home event in 2000 and 2001, Fiorio went on to do a full Production World Rally Championship programme for the Ralliart Italia team in 2002. He took his Mitsubishi Lancer Evolution 7 to production car class victory at the Rally Finland, and finished fifth in the PWRC drivers' championship. After retiring from the WRC, Fiorio competed in the ERC and in the Italian Rally Championship.

== Death ==
Fiorio died due to cancer on 17 August 2026, at the age of 61.
