= 1987 World Rally Championship =

15th season of the FIA World Rally Championship

Champions
- World Drivers' Champion: Juha Kankkunen
- World Manufacturers' Champion: Lancia

Seasons
- ← 1986 1988 →

The 1987 World Rally Championship was the 15th season of the Fédération Internationale de l'Automobile (FIA) World Rally Championship (WRC). The season consisted of 13 rallies in the same venues of the previous season. The only alteration to the schedule was the move of the Olympus Rally from December to June on the calendar.

1987 marked the beginning of a new era for the WRC, as it was the first season driven without the powerful and popular Group B rally cars, seeing the Group A cars come to the forefront of the world stage and the institution of championships not only for manufacturers and drivers, but also drivers of production and two-wheel drive cars. Group A would remain at the forefront of the championship for ten years, where a new specification, World Rally Car were made standard in 1997. The FIA also changed the basic scoring rules for manufacturers although they retained the policy of having two rallies not count toward manufacturers totals. New Zealand and the Ivory Coast were selected in 1987 to count solely for drivers' titles.

Martini Lancia proved most successful in adjusting to the new lower-powered cars, adopting the Lancia Delta HF 4WD, driven by Finns Juha Kankkunen and Markku Alén as well as Italian Miki Biasion. Between the three, Lancia would gather nine rally wins over the thirteen race season, dominating the manufacturers' race for the championship. Meanwhile, the three drivers split success between them, placing closely in the top three places for the drivers' title by the end of the season.

Audi Sport retained both Hannu Mikkola and Walter Röhrl, although they could not duplicate the success of their Group B seasons, both placing well down in the drivers' title competition. Audi however did gain some points from others team running the Quattro. Clarion Team Europe with driver Per Eklund contributed 26 points to the work's effort while Mig Linz's entry, Georg Fischer added another eight, bolstering Audi's bid for second overall.

The Philips Renault Elf team struggled through the season with the Group A Renault 11 Turbo. French drivers Jean Ragnotti and François Chatriot were unable to gain much success, with the highlight of their season coming at Portugal with Ragnotti's second-place finish.

Volkswagen Motorsport followed their success of the previous season with Swede Kenneth Eriksson, the 1986 winner of the championship for drivers of Group A cars. Eriksson was able to place fourth overall on the season, beaten only by Lancia drivers. Volkswagen, lacking a major second driver, was surpassed by not only Lancia, but Audi and Renault as well in the manufacturer standings.

Ford Motor Company made its return to serious competition by enlisting drivers Ari Vatanen and Stig Blomqvist, but struggled early on with the Sierra XR 4x4. The car was dropped, its replacement on the works team coming in the end of the season in the form of the redesigned Sierra RS Cosworth, which met with much greater success, challenging the dominant Lancias in the final three events of the season.

== Calendar ==
Rd.	Start date	Finish date	Rally	Rally headquarters	Surface	Stages	Distance	Points
1	18 January	22 January	(Monaco) 55th Rallye Automobile Monte-Carlo	Monte Carlo	Mixed	26	593.45 km	Drivers & Manufacturers
2	13 February	14 February	(Sweden) 37th International Swedish Rally	Karlstad, Värmland County	Snow	27	408.15 km	Drivers & Manufacturers
3	11 March	14 March	21st Rallye de Portugal - Vinho do Porto	Estoril, Lisbon	Mixed	37	603.50 km	Drivers & Manufacturers
4	16 April	20 April	(Kenya) 35th Marlboro Safari Rally	Nairobi	Gravel	N/A	4011 km	Drivers & Manufacturers
5	7 May	9 May	31st Tour de Corse - Rallye de France	Ajaccio, Corsica	Tarmac	24	618.20 km	Drivers & Manufacturers
6	31 May	3 June	(Greece) 34th Acropolis Rally	Athens	Gravel	36	553 km	Drivers & Manufacturers
7	26 June	29 June	(United States) 15th Toyota Olympus Rally	Tacoma, Washington	Gravel	44	539.20 km	Drivers & Manufacturers
8	11 July	13 July	18th AWA Clarion Rally of New Zealand	Auckland	Gravel	36	590.34 km	Drivers only
9	5 August	8 August	7th Marlboro Rally of Argentina	Buenos Aires	Gravel	27	596.54 km	Drivers & Manufacturers
10	27 August	30 August	(Finland) 37th Rally of the 1000 Lakes	Jyväskylä, Central Finland	Gravel	52	504.29 km	Drivers & Manufacturers
11	22 September	26 September	(Ivory Coast) 19th Rallye Cote d'Ivoire	Abidjan	Gravel	N/A	3831 km	Drivers only
12	12 October	15 October	(Italy) 29th Rallye Sanremo	Sanremo, Liguria	Mixed	41	561.11 km	Drivers & Manufacturers
13	22 November	25 November	(United Kingdom) 43rd Lombard RAC Rally	Chester, Cheshire	Gravel	48	513.29 km	Drivers & Manufacturers

== Teams and drivers ==
Team	Manufacturer	Car	Tyre	Drivers	Rounds
(Italy) Martini Lancia	Lancia	Delta HF 4WD	P	(Finland) Juha Kankkunen	1–3, 6–7, 10, 13
(Italy) Martini Lancia	Lancia	Delta HF 4WD	P	(Italy) Miki Biasion	1, 3, 5–7, 9, 12
(Italy) Martini Lancia	Lancia	Delta HF 4WD	P	(France) Bruno Saby	1, 5, 12–13
(Italy) Martini Lancia	Lancia	Delta HF 4WD	P	(Finland) Markku Alén	2–3, 6–7, 10, 12–13
(Italy) Martini Lancia	Lancia	Delta HF 4WD	P	(Sweden) Mikael Ericsson	2, 13
(Italy) Martini Lancia	Lancia	Delta HF 4WD	P	(Kenya) Vic Preston Jr	4
(Italy) Martini Lancia	Lancia	Delta HF 4WD	P	(France) Yves Loubet	5
(Italy) Martini Lancia	Lancia	Delta HF 4WD	P	(Argentina) Jorge Recalde	9
(Japan) Mazda Rally Team Europe	Mazda	323 4WD	M	(Finland) Timo Salonen	1–3, 10, 13
(Japan) Mazda Rally Team Europe	Mazda	323 4WD	M	(Sweden) Ingvar Carlsson	1–3, 9–10
(Japan) Mazda Rally Team Europe	Mazda	323 4WD	M	(Finland) Mikael Sundström	2, 10, 13
(Japan) Mazda Rally Team Europe	Mazda	323 4WD	M	(Finland) Harri Toivonen	2, 10
(Japan) Mazda Rally Team Europe	Mazda	323 4WD	M	(New Zealand) Rod Millen	7
(Japan) Mazda Rally Team Europe	Mazda	323 4WD	M	(United States) Jon Woodner	7
(Japan) Mazda Rally Team Europe	Mazda	323 4WD	M	(New Zealand) Neil Allport	8
(Japan) Mazda Rally Team Europe	Mazda	323 4WD	M	(Belgium) Pascal Gaban	12
(France) Philips Renault Elf (France) Renault Sport Elf	Renault	11 Turbo	M	(France) Jean Ragnotti	1, 3, 5–6, 12
(France) Philips Renault Elf (France) Renault Sport Elf	Renault	11 Turbo	M	(France) François Chatriot	1, 3, 5–6, 12
(France) Philips Renault Elf (France) Renault Sport Elf	Renault	11 Turbo	M	(France) Alain Oreille	1, 5
(France) Philips Renault Elf (France) Renault Sport Elf	Renault	11 Turbo	M	(Portugal) Manuel Breyner	3
(France) Philips Renault Elf (France) Renault Sport Elf	Renault	11 Turbo	M	(Portugal) Inverno Amaral	3
(France) Philips Renault Elf (France) Renault Sport Elf	Renault	11 Turbo	M	(Portugal) Bento Amaral	3
(Germany) Audi Sport	Audi	200 Quattro; 80 Quattro; Coupé Quattro	M	(Germany) Walter Röhrl	1, 4, 6
(Germany) Audi Sport	Audi	200 Quattro; 80 Quattro; Coupé Quattro	M	(Finland) Hannu Mikkola	4, 6, 10
(Germany) Audi Sport	Audi	200 Quattro; 80 Quattro; Coupé Quattro	M	(Sweden) Lars-Erik Torph	2
(Germany) Audi Sport	Audi	200 Quattro; 80 Quattro; Coupé Quattro	M	(Sweden) Per Eklund	2, 9, 10, 13
(Germany) Audi Sport	Audi	200 Quattro; 80 Quattro; Coupé Quattro	M	(Sweden) Göran Åndberg	2
(Germany) Audi Sport	Audi	200 Quattro; 80 Quattro; Coupé Quattro	M	(Austria) Rudi Stohl	3–4, 6, 11–12
(Germany) Audi Sport	Audi	200 Quattro; 80 Quattro; Coupé Quattro	M	(Argentina) Jorge Recalde	6
(Germany) Audi Sport	Audi	200 Quattro; 80 Quattro; Coupé Quattro	M	(Italy) Paolo Alessandrini	6
(Germany) Audi Sport	Audi	200 Quattro; 80 Quattro; Coupé Quattro	M	(United States) John Buffum	7
(Germany) Audi Sport	Audi	200 Quattro; 80 Quattro; Coupé Quattro	M	(United Kingdom) David Llewellin	12–13
(United Kingdom) Ford Motor Co Ltd	Ford	Sierra XR 4x4 Sierra RS Cosworth	P	(Sweden) Stig Blomqvist	1–2, 4–5, 8, 10, 13
(United Kingdom) Ford Motor Co Ltd	Ford	Sierra XR 4x4 Sierra RS Cosworth	P	(Sweden) Kalle Grundel	1–2, 5
(United Kingdom) Ford Motor Co Ltd	Ford	Sierra XR 4x4 Sierra RS Cosworth	P	(France) Didier Auriol	1, 5, 12
(United Kingdom) Ford Motor Co Ltd	Ford	Sierra XR 4x4 Sierra RS Cosworth	P	(Spain) Carlos Sainz	3, 5, 13
(United Kingdom) Ford Motor Co Ltd	Ford	Sierra XR 4x4 Sierra RS Cosworth	P	(Portugal) Joaquim Santos	3
(United Kingdom) Ford Motor Co Ltd	Ford	Sierra XR 4x4 Sierra RS Cosworth	P	(Kenya) John Hellier	4
(United Kingdom) Ford Motor Co Ltd	Ford	Sierra XR 4x4 Sierra RS Cosworth	P	(Finland) Ari Vatanen	10
(United Kingdom) Ford Motor Co Ltd	Ford	Sierra XR 4x4 Sierra RS Cosworth	P	(United Kingdom) Jimmy McRae	12–13
(United Kingdom) Ford Motor Co Ltd	Ford	Sierra XR 4x4 Sierra RS Cosworth	P	(United Kingdom) Mark Lovell	13
(United Kingdom) Ford Motor Co Ltd	Ford	Sierra XR 4x4 Sierra RS Cosworth	P	(United Kingdom) George Donaldson	13
(Germany) Volkswagen Motorsport	Volkswagen	Golf GTI 16V	P	(Sweden) Kenneth Eriksson	1–6, 8–9, 11, 13
(Germany) Volkswagen Motorsport	Volkswagen	Golf GTI 16V	P	(Germany) Erwin Weber	1, 3–4, 6, 9, 11
(Germany) Volkswagen Motorsport	Volkswagen	Golf GTI 16V	P	(Finland) Teemu Tahko	10
(Japan) Fuji Heavy Industries	Subaru	RX Turbo	D	(Sweden) Per Eklund	1, 4
(Japan) Fuji Heavy Industries	Subaru	RX Turbo	D	(Germany) Harald Demuth	1
(Japan) Fuji Heavy Industries	Subaru	RX Turbo	D	(Finland) Ari Vatanen	4
(Japan) Fuji Heavy Industries	Subaru	RX Turbo	D	(New Zealand) Peter 'Possum' Bourne	4, 8, 13
(Japan) Fuji Heavy Industries	Subaru	RX Turbo	D	(Kenya) Frank Tundo	4
(Japan) Fuji Heavy Industries	Subaru	RX Turbo	D	(Chile) José Celsi	9
Mercedes France	Mercedes	190E 2.3 16V	M	(France) Bernard Darniche	1, 5
Mercedes France	Mercedes	190E 2.3 16V	M	(France) Dany Snobeck	1
(Italy) Jolly Club	Lancia	Delta HF 4WD	P	(Italy) Vittorio Caneva	1–3, 6, 12
(Italy) Jolly Club	Lancia	Delta HF 4WD	P	(Italy) Alex Fiorio	1–3, 6–7, 10, 12
(Italy) Jolly Club	Lancia	Delta HF 4WD	P	(Italy) Giorgio Schön	1
(Italy) Jolly Club	Lancia	Delta HF 4WD	P	(Sweden) Mikael Ericsson	6, 12
(Italy) Jolly Club	Lancia	Delta HF 4WD	P	(Greece) Giannis Vardinogiannis	6
(Italy) Jolly Club	Lancia	Delta HF 4WD	P	(Argentina) Jorge Recalde	9
(Italy) Jolly Club	Lancia	Delta HF 4WD	P	(Italy) Gianfranco Cunico	12
(Italy) Jolly Club	Lancia	Delta HF 4WD	P	(Italy) Alex Fassina	12
(Italy) Jolly Club	Lancia	Delta HF 4WD	P	(Italy) Pierangela Riva	12
(United Kingdom) GM Euro Sport	Opel Vauxhall	Kadett GSI 16V; Astra GTE	M	(Sweden) Mats Jonsson	2, 10, 13
(United Kingdom) GM Euro Sport	Opel Vauxhall	Kadett GSI 16V; Astra GTE	M	(Sweden) Björn Johansson	2
(United Kingdom) GM Euro Sport	Opel Vauxhall	Kadett GSI 16V; Astra GTE	M	(Sweden) Håkan Eriksson	2
(United Kingdom) GM Euro Sport	Opel Vauxhall	Kadett GSI 16V; Astra GTE	M	(United Kingdom) David Metcalfe	2, 13
(United Kingdom) GM Euro Sport	Opel Vauxhall	Kadett GSI 16V; Astra GTE	M	(Finland) Rauno Aaltonen	4
(United Kingdom) GM Euro Sport	Opel Vauxhall	Kadett GSI 16V; Astra GTE	M	(France) Guy Fréquelin	5, 12
(United Kingdom) GM Euro Sport	Opel Vauxhall	Kadett GSI 16V; Astra GTE	M	(Austria) Sepp Haider	10, 12–13
(United Kingdom) GM Euro Sport	Opel Vauxhall	Kadett GSI 16V; Astra GTE	M	(United Kingdom) Derek Bell	13
(United Kingdom) GM Euro Sport	Opel Vauxhall	Kadett GSI 16V; Astra GTE	M	(United Kingdom) Malcolm Wilson	13
(United Kingdom) GM Euro Sport	Opel Vauxhall	Kadett GSI 16V; Astra GTE	M	(United Kingdom) Andrew Wood	13
(United Kingdom) GM Euro Sport	Opel Vauxhall	Kadett GSI 16V; Astra GTE	M	(Finland) Pentti Airikkala	13
(Japan) Mitsubishi Ralliart Europe	Mitsubishi	Starion Turbo 4WD	M	(Germany) Robert Koch	2
(Japan) Mitsubishi Ralliart Europe	Mitsubishi	Starion Turbo 4WD	M	(New Zealand) David Offier	8
(Japan) Mitsubishi Ralliart Europe	Mitsubishi	Starion Turbo 4WD	M	(Finland) Lasse Lampi	10
(Japan) Mitsubishi Ralliart Europe	Mitsubishi	Starion Turbo 4WD	M	(Finland) Antero Laine	10
(Japan) Mitsubishi Ralliart Europe	Mitsubishi	Starion Turbo 4WD	M	(France) Patrick Tauziac	11
(Japan) Toyota Team Europe	Toyota	Supra 3.0i Supra Turbo	P	(Sweden) Björn Waldegård	4, 7, 11
(Japan) Toyota Team Europe	Toyota	Supra 3.0i Supra Turbo	P	(Sweden) Lars-Erik Torph	4, 7, 11
(Japan) Toyota Team Europe	Toyota	Supra 3.0i Supra Turbo	P	(Kenya) Robin Ulyate	4, 11
(Japan) Nissan Motorsports International	Nissan	200SX	D	(Kenya) Shekhar Mehta	4, 6–7, 11
(Japan) Nissan Motorsports International	Nissan	200SX	D	(Italy) Andrea Zanussi	4, 6
(Japan) Nissan Motorsports International	Nissan	200SX	D	(Kenya) Mike Kirkland	4, 6, 11
(Japan) Nissan Motorsports International	Nissan	200SX	D	(Kenya) Jayant Shah	4
(Japan) Nissan Motorsports International	Nissan	200SX	D	(Greece) Stratis Hatzipanayiotou	6
(Japan) Nissan Motorsports International	Nissan	200SX	D	(Sweden) Mikael Ericsson	7
(Japan) Nissan Motorsports International	Nissan	200SX	D	(Sweden) Per Eklund	7
(Japan) Nissan Motorsports International	Nissan	200SX	D	(New Zealand) Paddy Davidson	8
(Japan) Nissan Motorsports International	Nissan	200SX	D	(France) Alain Ambrosino	11
(France) Rothmans Motul BMW	BMW	M3	M	(France) Bernard Béguin	5
(France) Rothmans Motul BMW	BMW	M3	M	(Belgium) Marc Duez	5
(France) Rothmans Motul BMW	BMW	M3	M	(France) Patrick Bernardini	5
(Italy) Grifone Esso	Lancia	Delta HF 4WD	P	(Italy) Paolo Alessandriani	7, 12
(Italy) Grifone Esso	Lancia	Delta HF 4WD	P	(Italy) Fabrizio Tabaton	12
(Austria) Funkberaterring Rally Team	Lancia	Delta HF 4WD	M	(Austria) Franz Wittmann	8

== Schedule and results ==
1987 World Rally Championship schedule and results
Round	Rally name	Stages	Podium finishers					
Round	Rally name	Stages	Rank	Driver	Co-driver	Team	Car	Time
1	(Monaco) Rallye Monte Carlo (17 January–22 January)	26 stages 571 km Tarmac	1	(Italy) Miki Biasion	(Italy) Tiziano Siviero	(Italy) Martini Lancia	Lancia Delta HF 4WD	7:39.50
1	(Monaco) Rallye Monte Carlo (17 January–22 January)	26 stages 571 km Tarmac	2	(Finland) Juha Kankkunen	(Finland) Juha Piironen	(Italy) Martini Lancia	Lancia Delta HF 4WD	7:40.49
1	(Monaco) Rallye Monte Carlo (17 January–22 January)	26 stages 571 km Tarmac	3	(West Germany) Walter Röhrl	(West Germany) Christian Geistdörfer	(West Germany) Audi Sport	Audi 200 Quattro	7:44.00
2	(Sweden) Swedish Rally (13 February–14 February)	26 stages 400 km Snow/Ice	1	(Finland) Timo Salonen	(Finland) Seppo Harjanne	(Japan) Mazda Rally Team Europe	Mazda 323 4WD	4:11.00
2	(Sweden) Swedish Rally (13 February–14 February)	26 stages 400 km Snow/Ice	2	(Sweden) Mikael Ericsson	(Sweden) Claes Billstam	(Italy) Martini Lancia	Lancia Delta HF 4WD	4:11.23
2	(Sweden) Swedish Rally (13 February–14 February)	26 stages 400 km Snow/Ice	3	(Finland) Juha Kankkunen	(Finland) Juha Piironen	(Italy) Martini Lancia	Lancia Delta HF 4WD	4:12.46
3	Rallye de Portugal (11 March–14 March)	37 stages 597 km Gravel/Tarmac	1	(Finland) Markku Alén	(Finland) Ilkka Kivimäki	(Italy) Martini Lancia	Lancia Delta HF 4WD	7:09.39
3	Rallye de Portugal (11 March–14 March)	37 stages 597 km Gravel/Tarmac	2	(France) Jean Ragnotti	(France) Pierre Thimonier	(France) Renault Sport Elf	Renault 11 Turbo	7:12.32
3	Rallye de Portugal (11 March–14 March)	37 stages 597 km Gravel/Tarmac	3	(Sweden) Kenneth Eriksson	(West Germany) Peter Diekmann	(West Germany) Volkswagen Motorsport	Volkswagen Golf GTI 16V	7:14.37
4	(Kenya) Safari Rally (16 April–20 April)	83 controls 4011 km Gravel	1	(Finland) Hannu Mikkola	(Sweden) Arne Hertz	(West Germany) Audi Sport	Audi 200 Quattro	3:39.44
4	(Kenya) Safari Rally (16 April–20 April)	83 controls 4011 km Gravel	2	(West Germany) Walter Röhrl	(West Germany) Christian Geistdörfer	(West Germany) Audi Sport	Audi 200 Quattro	3:56.59
4	(Kenya) Safari Rally (16 April–20 April)	83 controls 4011 km Gravel	3	(Sweden) Lars-Erik Torph	(Sweden) Benny Melander	(Japan) Toyota Team Europe	Toyota Supra 3.0i	4:31.09
5	(France) Tour de Corse (7 May–9 May)	24 stages 619 km Tarmac	1	(France) Bernard Béguin	(France) Jean-Jacques Lenne	(France) Rothmans Motul BMW	BMW M3	7:22.30
5	(France) Tour de Corse (7 May–9 May)	24 stages 619 km Tarmac	2	(France) Yves Loubet	(France) Jean-Bernard Vieu	(Italy) Martini Lancia	Lancia Delta HF 4WD	7:24.38
5	(France) Tour de Corse (7 May–9 May)	24 stages 619 km Tarmac	3	(Italy) Miki Biasion	(Italy) Tiziano Siviero	(Italy) Martini Lancia	Lancia Delta HF 4WD	7:24.58
6	(Greece) Acropolis Rally (May 31–3)	33 stages 538 km Gravel	1	(Finland) Markku Alén	(Finland) Ilkka Kivimäki	(Italy) Martini Lancia	Lancia Delta HF 4WD	7:25.57
6	(Greece) Acropolis Rally (May 31–3)	33 stages 538 km Gravel	2	(Finland) Juha Kankkunen	(Finland) Juha Piironen	(Italy) Martini Lancia	Lancia Delta HF 4WD	7:26.45
6	(Greece) Acropolis Rally (May 31–3)	33 stages 538 km Gravel	3	(Finland) Hannu Mikkola	(Sweden) Arne Hertz	(West Germany) Audi Sport	Audi 200 Quattro	7:31.21
7	(United States) Olympus Rally (26 June–29 June)	42 stages 540 km Gravel	1	(Finland) Juha Kankkunen	(Finland) Juha Piironen	(Italy) Martini Lancia	Lancia Delta HF 4WD	5:59.24
7	(United States) Olympus Rally (26 June–29 June)	42 stages 540 km Gravel	2	(Italy) Miki Biasion	(Italy) Tiziano Siviero	(Italy) Martini Lancia	Lancia Delta HF 4WD	5:59.36
7	(United States) Olympus Rally (26 June–29 June)	42 stages 540 km Gravel	3	(Finland) Markku Alén	(Finland) Ilkka Kivimäki	(Italy) Martini Lancia	Lancia Delta HF 4WD	6:00.06
8	Rally New Zealand (11 July–14 July)	36 stages 593 km Gravel	1	(Austria) Franz Wittmann	(Austria) Jörg Pattermann	(Austria) Funkberaterring Rally Team	Lancia Delta HF 4WD	6:56.00
8	Rally New Zealand (11 July–14 July)	36 stages 593 km Gravel	2	(Sweden) Kenneth Eriksson	(West Germany) Peter Diekmann	(West Germany) Volkswagen Motorsport	Volkswagen Golf GTI 16V	6:56.47
8	Rally New Zealand (11 July–14 July)	36 stages 593 km Gravel	3	(New Zealand) Possum Bourne	(New Zealand) Michael Eggleton	(Japan) Fuji Heavy Industries	Subaru RX Turbo	7:04.25
9	Rally Argentina (4 August–8 August)	26 stages 596 km Gravel	1	(Italy) Miki Biasion	(Italy) Tiziano Siviero	(Italy) Martini Lancia	Lancia Delta HF 4WD	7:10.27
9	Rally Argentina (4 August–8 August)	26 stages 596 km Gravel	2	(Argentina) Jorge Recalde	(Argentina) Jorge del Buono	(Italy) Martini Lancia	Lancia Delta HF 4WD	7:11.28
9	Rally Argentina (4 August–8 August)	26 stages 596 km Gravel	3	(West Germany) Erwin Weber	(West Germany) Matthias Feltz	(West Germany) Volkswagen Motorsport	Volkswagen Golf GTI 16V	7:37.11
10	(Finland) 1000 Lakes Rally (27 August–30 August)	52 stages 494 km Gravel	1	(Finland) Markku Alén	(Finland) Ilkka Kivimäki	(Italy) Martini Lancia	Lancia Delta HF 4WD	5:12.22
10	(Finland) 1000 Lakes Rally (27 August–30 August)	52 stages 494 km Gravel	2	(Finland) Ari Vatanen	(United Kingdom) Terry Harryman	(United Kingdom) Ford Motor Co Ltd	Ford Sierra RS Cosworth	5:17.54
10	(Finland) 1000 Lakes Rally (27 August–30 August)	52 stages 494 km Gravel	3	(Sweden) Stig Blomqvist	(Sweden) Bruno Berglund	(United Kingdom) Ford Motor Co Ltd	Ford Sierra RS Cosworth	5:18.51
11	(Ivory Coast) Rallye Côte d'Ivoire (22 September–26 September)	29 controls 3831 km Gravel	1	(Sweden) Kenneth Eriksson	(West Germany) Peter Diekmann	(West Germany) Volkswagen Motorsport	Volkswagen Golf GTI 16V	+48.57 pen
11	(Ivory Coast) Rallye Côte d'Ivoire (22 September–26 September)	29 controls 3831 km Gravel	2	(Kenya) Shekhar Mehta	(Kenya) Rob Combes	(Japan) Nissan Motorsports International	Nissan 200SX	+1:09.18 pen
11	(Ivory Coast) Rallye Côte d'Ivoire (22 September–26 September)	29 controls 3831 km Gravel	3	(West Germany) Erwin Weber	(West Germany) Matthias Feltz	(West Germany) Volkswagen Motorsport	Volkswagen Golf GTI 16V	+2:05.56 pen
12	(Italy) Rallye Sanremo (12 October–15 October)	38 stages 529 km Gravel/Tarmac	1	(Italy) Miki Biasion	(Italy) Tiziano Siviero	(Italy) Martini Lancia	Lancia Delta HF 4WD	6:09.19
12	(Italy) Rallye Sanremo (12 October–15 October)	38 stages 529 km Gravel/Tarmac	2	(France) Bruno Saby	(France) Jean-François Fauchille	(Italy) Martini Lancia	Lancia Delta HF 4WD	6:14.30
12	(Italy) Rallye Sanremo (12 October–15 October)	38 stages 529 km Gravel/Tarmac	3	(France) Jean Ragnotti	(France) Pierre Thimonier	(France) Renault Sport Elf	Renault 11 Turbo	6:16.55
13	(United Kingdom) RAC Rally (22 November–25 November)	47 stages 539 km Gravel/Tarmac	1	(Finland) Juha Kankkunen	(Finland) Juha Piironen	(Italy) Martini Lancia	Lancia Delta HF 4WD	5:26.36
13	(United Kingdom) RAC Rally (22 November–25 November)	47 stages 539 km Gravel/Tarmac	2	(Sweden) Stig Blomqvist	(Sweden) Bruno Berglund	(United Kingdom) Ford Motor Co Ltd	Ford Sierra RS Cosworth	5:29.48
13	(United Kingdom) RAC Rally (22 November–25 November)	47 stages 539 km Gravel/Tarmac	3	(United Kingdom) Jimmy McRae	(United Kingdom) Ian Grindrod	(United Kingdom) RED Ford	Ford Sierra RS Cosworth	5:33.15

== Championship for manufacturers ==
1987 World Rally Championship for Manufacturers
Rank	Manufacturers	Event											Total points
Rank	Manufacturers	(Monaco) MON	(Sweden) SWE	(Portugal) POR	(Kenya) KEN	(France) FRA	(Greece) GRC	(United States) USA	(Argentina) ARG	(Finland) FIN	(Italy) ITA	(United Kingdom) GBR	Total points
1	(Italy) Lancia	20	(17)	20	-	(17)	20	20	20	20	20	(20)	140
2	(West Germany) Audi	14	6	8	20	-	14	-	-	12	-	8	82
3	(France) Renault	8	-	17	-	12	10	-	10	-	14	-	71
4	(West Germany) Volkswagen	10	4	14	12	-	8	-	14	-	-	2	64
5	(United States) Ford	-	8	2	-	6	-	-	-	17	12	17	62
6	(Japan) Mazda	12	20	-	-	-	-	12	-	8	-	-	52
7	(Japan) Toyota	-	-	-	14	-	-	8	-	-	-	-	22
8	(West Germany) BMW	-	-	-	-	20	-	-	-	-	-	-	20
9	(West Germany) Opel	-	-	-	2	-	-	-	-	-	8	6	16
10	(Japan) Subaru	1	-	-	10	-	-	-	-	-	-	1	12
11	(Japan) Nissan	-	-	-	4	-	1	4	-	-	-	-	9
12	(Italy) Fiat	-	-	1	-	-	-	-	4	-	-	-	5

1987 World Rally Championship point awards for manufacturers
Points awarded by finish	1st	2nd	3rd	4th	5th	6th	7th	8th	9th	10th
Points awarded by finish	20	17	14	12	10	8	6	4	2	1

== Championship for drivers ==
1987 World Rally Championship for Drivers
Rank	Driver	Event													Total points
Rank	Driver	(Monaco) MON	(Sweden) SWE	(Portugal) POR	(Kenya) KEN	(France) FRA	(Greece) GRC	(United States) USA	(New Zealand) NZL	(Argentina) ARG	(Finland) FIN	(Ivory Coast) CIV	(Italy) ITA	(United Kingdom) GBR	Total points
1	(Finland) Juha Kankkunen	15	12	10	-	-	15	20	-	-	8	-	-	20	100
2	(Italy) Miki Biasion	20	-	3	-	12	4	15	-	20	-	-	20	-	94
3	(Finland) Markku Alén	-	8	20	-	-	20	12	-	-	20	-	-	8	88
4	(Sweden) Kenneth Eriksson	8	3	12	-	-	-	-	15	10	-	20	-	2	70
5	(France) Jean Ragnotti	6	-	15	-	10	8	-	-	-	-	-	12	-	51
6	(West Germany) Erwin Weber	4	-	-	10	-	6	-	-	12	-	12	-	-	44
7	(Sweden) Stig Blomqvist	-	6	-	-	-	-	-	-	-	12	-	-	15	33
8	(Finland) Hannu Mikkola	-	-	-	20	-	12	-	-	-	-	-	-	-	32
9	(Argentina) Jorge Recalde	-	-	1	-	-	10	4	-	16	-	-	-	-	30
10	(Sweden) Mikael Ericsson	-	15	-	-	-	-	-	-	-	-	-	3	10	28
11	(West Germany) Walter Röhrl	12	-	-	15	-	-	-	-	-	-	-	-	-	27
12	(Sweden) Per Eklund	1	4	-	8	-	-	2	-	-	10	-	-	-	25
13	(France) François Chatriot	3	-	8	-	8	3	-	-	-	-	-	-	-	22
14	(Finland) Timo Salonen	-	20	-	-	-	-	-	-	-	-	-	-	-	20
14	(France) Bernard Béguin	-	-	-	-	20	-	-	-	-	-	-	-	-	20
14	(Austria) Franz Wittmann	-	-	-	-	-	-	-	20	-	-	-	-	-	20
17	(Sweden) Ingvar Carlsson	10	10	-	-	-	-	-	-	-	-	-	-	-	20
18	(Kenya) Shekhar Mehta	-	-	-	-	-	-	3	-	-	-	15	-	-	18
19	(Finland) Ari Vatanen	-	-	-	1	-	-	-	-	-	15	-	-	-	16
20	(France) Yves Loubet	-	-	-	-	15	-	-	-	-	-	-	-	-	15
20	(France) Bruno Saby	-	-	-	-	-	-	-	-	-	-	-	15	-	15
22	(France) Didier Auriol	-	-	-	-	3	-	-	-	-	-	-	10	-	13
23	(Sweden) Lars-Erik Torph	-	-	-	12	-	-	-	-	-	-	-	-	-	12
23	(New Zealand) 'Possum' Bourne	-	-	-	-	-	-	-	12	-	-	-	-	-	12
23	(United Kingdom) Jimmy McRae	-	-	-	-	-	-	-	-	-	-	-	-	12	12
26	(New Zealand) Rod Millen	-	-	-	-	-	-	10	-	-	-	-	-	-	10
26	(New Zealand) Tony Teesdale	-	-	-	-	-	-	-	10	-	-	-	-	-	10
26	(France) Patrick Tauziac	-	-	-	-	-	-	-	-	-	-	10	-	-	10
29	(Italy) Paolo Alessandrini	-	-	-	-	-	-	8	-	-	-	-	2	-	10
30	(Austria) Rudi Stohl	-	-	4	4	-	2	-	-	-	-	-	-	-	10
31	(Australia) David Officer	-	-	-	-	-	-	-	8	-	-	-	-	-	8
31	(Argentina) Gabriel Raies	-	-	-	-	-	-	-	-	8	-	-	-	-	8
31	(France) Patrick Copetti	-	-	-	-	-	-	-	-	-	-	8	-	-	8
31	(Italy) Fabrizio Tabaton	-	-	-	-	-	-	-	-	-	-	-	8	-	8
35	(Spain) Carlos Sainz	-	-	-	-	4	-	-	-	-	-	-	-	3	7
36	(Austria) Georg Fischer	-	-	6	-	-	-	-	-	-	-	-	-	-	6
36	(Kenya) Robin Ulyate	-	-	-	6	-	-	-	-	-	-	-	-	-	6
36	(Belgium) Marc Duez	-	-	-	-	6	-	-	-	-	-	-	-	-	6
36	(Sweden) Björn Waldegård	-	-	-	-	-	-	6	-	-	-	-	-	-	6
36	(New Zealand) Ken Adamson	-	-	-	-	-	-	-	6	-	-	-	-	-	6
36	(Brazil) Paulo Lemos	-	-	-	-	-	-	-	-	6	-	-	-	-	6
36	(Sweden) Thorbjörn Edling	-	-	-	-	-	-	-	-	-	6	-	-	-	6
36	(France) Adolphe Choteau	-	-	-	-	-	-	-	-	-	-	6	-	-	6
36	(France) Guy Fréquelin	-	-	-	-	-	-	-	-	-	-	-	6	-	6
36	(United Kingdom) David Llewellin	-	-	-	-	-	-	-	-	-	-	-	-	6	6
46	(New Zealand) Stuart Weeber	-	-	-	-	-	-	-	4	-	-	-	-	-	4
46	(Brazil) Jorge Fleck	-	-	-	-	-	-	-	-	4	-	-	-	-	4
46	(Finland) Sebastian Lindholm	-	-	-	-	-	-	-	-	-	4	-	-	-	4
46	(France) Martial Yacé	-	-	-	-	-	-	-	-	-	-	4	-	-	4
46	(Italy) Alex Fiorio	-	-	-	-	-	-	-	-	-	-	-	4	-	4
46	(Sweden) Mats Jonsson	-	-	-	-	-	-	-	-	-	-	-	-	4	4
52	(Kenya) Mike Kirkland	-	-	-	3	-	1	-	-	-	-	-	-	-	4
53	(New Zealand) Simon Davies	-	-	-	-	-	-	-	3	-	-	-	-	-	3
53	(Argentina) Jorge Bescham	-	-	-	-	-	-	-	-	3	-	-	-	-	3
53	(Finland) Tomi Palmqvist	-	-	-	-	-	-	-	-	-	3	-	-	-	3
53	(Italy) Alessandro Molino	-	-	-	-	-	-	-	-	-	-	3	-	-	3
57	(Sweden) Erik Johansson	-	1	-	-	-	-	-	-	-	2	-	-	-	3
58	(France) Bertrand Balas	2	-	-	-	-	-	-	-	-	-	-	-	-	2
58	(Sweden) Bror Danielsson	-	2	-	-	-	-	-	-	-	-	-	-	-	2
58	(Portugal) Joaquim Santos	-	-	2	-	-	-	-	-	-	-	-	-	-	2
58	(Finland) Rauno Aaltonen	-	-	-	2	-	-	-	-	-	-	-	-	-	2
58	(France) Alain Oreille	-	-	-	-	2	-	-	-	-	-	-	-	-	2
58	(Japan) Kouichi Hazu	-	-	-	-	-	-	-	2	-	-	-	-	-	2
58	(Argentina) Ernesto Soto	-	-	-	-	-	-	-	-	2	-	-	-	-	2
58	(Finland) Fredrik Donner	-	-	-	-	-	-	-	-	-	-	2	-	-	2
66	(France) Laurent Poggi	-	-	-	-	1	-	-	-	-	-	-	-	-	1
66	(New Zealand) Clive Smith	-	-	-	-	-	-	1	-	-	-	-	-	-	1
66	(New Zealand) Grant Goile	-	-	-	-	-	-	-	1	-	-	-	-	-	1
66	(Chile) Alejandro Schmauk	-	-	-	-	-	-	-	-	1	-	-	-	-	1
66	(Finland) Timo Heinonen	-	-	-	-	-	-	-	-	-	1	-	-	-	1
66	(Ivory Coast) Lambert Kouame	-	-	-	-	-	-	-	-	-	-	1	-	-	1
66	(Austria) Sepp Haider	-	-	-	-	-	-	-	-	-	-	-	1	-	1
66	(Sweden) Roger Ericsson	-	-	-	-	-	-	-	-	-	-	-	-	1	1

1987 World Rally Championship point awards for drivers
Points awarded by finish	1st	2nd	3rd	4th	5th	6th	7th	8th	9th	10th
Points awarded by finish	20	15	12	10	8	6	4	3	2	1

== See also ==
- 1987 in sports
