= Bernard Béguin =

French rally driver (born 1947)

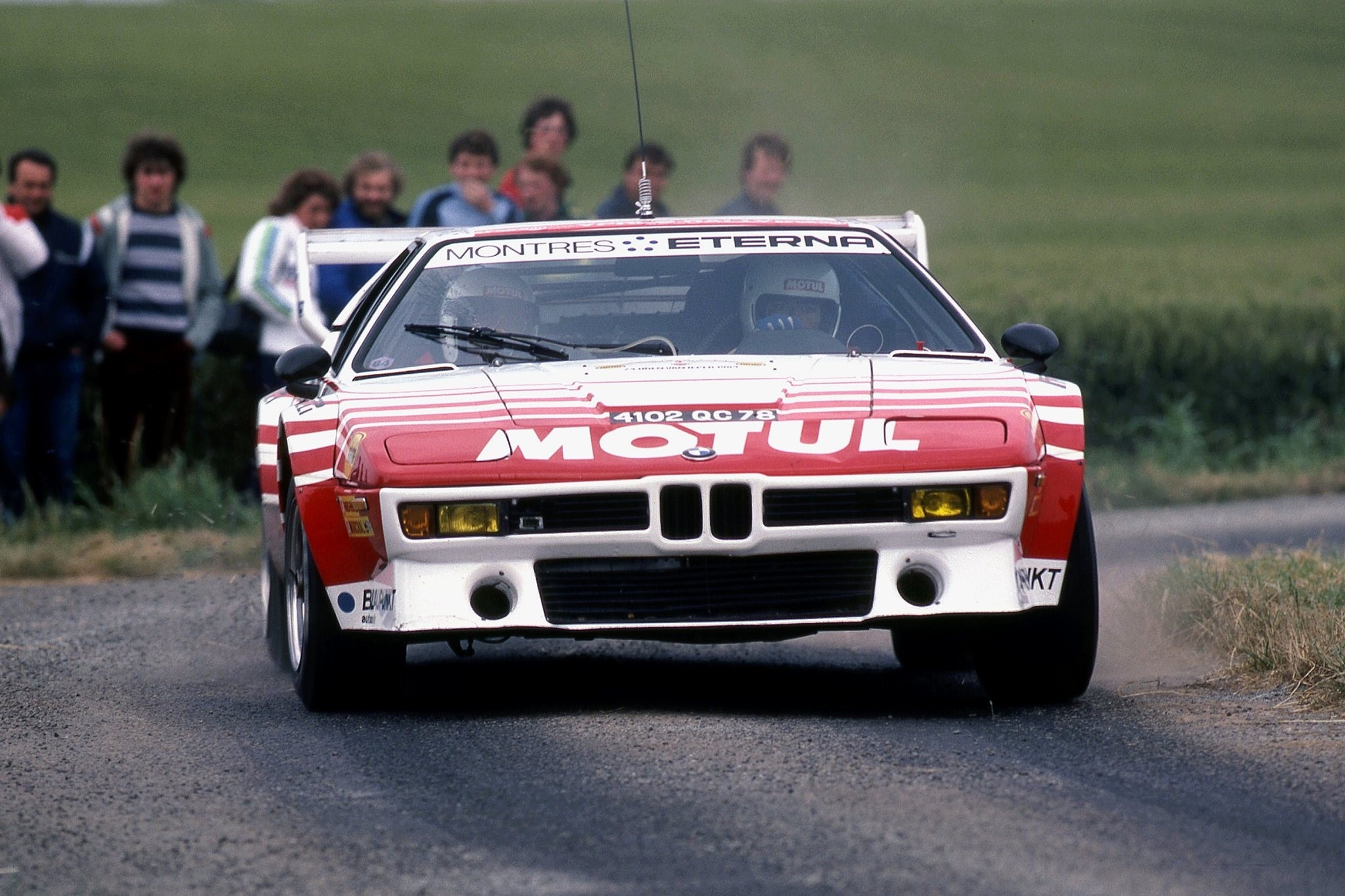
- Bernard Béguin during the 1984 Ypres Rally

Personal information
- Nationality: (France) French
- Born: 24 September 1947 (age 79); Grenoble

World Rally Championship record
- Years active: 1974 – 1993
- Co-driver: (France) Jacques Delaval (France) Jean-François Fauchille (France) Guy Gillot (France) Willy Huret (France) Philippe Ozoux (France) Jean-Jacques Lenne (France) Jean-Bernard Vieu (France) Jean-Marc Andrié (France) Jean-Paul Chiaroni
- Teams: Porsche, BMW
- Rallies: 16
- Championships: 0
- Rally wins: 1
- Podiums: 3
- Stage wins: 13
- Total points: 62
- First rally: 1974 Tour de Corse
- First win: 1987 Tour de Corse

Bernard Béguin (born 24 September 1947 in Grenoble) is a French former rally driver, who won the Tour de Corse in 1987, a round of the World Rally Championship.

== Career ==
A regular competitor on the Tour de Corse, Béguin scored his first World Rally Championship points by finishing third on the 1985 Tour de Corse in a Porsche 911. He returned two years later in a BMW M3 and won the rally. He scored points finishes on the event on three later occasions.

Béguin won the French Rally Championship four times, in 1979, 1991, 1992 and 1993.

== WRC victories ==
#	Event	Season	Co-driver	Car
1	31ème Tour de Corse - Rallye de France	1987	Jean-Jacques Lenne	BMW M3

== See also ==
- Louis Meznarie
