= Sepp Haider =

Austrian rally driver (born 1953)

Personal information
- Nationality: (Austria) Austrian
- Born: September 26, 1953 (age 73); Dienten, Austria

World Rally Championship record
- Years active: 1977 – 1993
- Co-driver: (Austria) Jörg Pattermann (Austria) Ferdinand Hinterleitner (United Kingdom) Rob Arthur (Kenya) Lofty Drews (United Kingdom) Mike Nicholson (Germany) Klaus Wendel
- Teams: Opel, SMS Audi
- Rallies: 14
- Championships: 0
- Rally wins: 1
- Podiums: 1
- Stage wins: 17
- Total points: 33
- First rally: 1977 Swedish Rally
- First win: 1988 Rally New Zealand
- Last rally: 1993 Rally Australia

Josef "Sepp" Haider (born 26 September 1953 in Dienten) is a former Austrian rally driver, who won Rally New Zealand in 1988, a round of the World Rally Championship.

== Career ==
After starting in local rallies, Haider bought an Opel Kadett GT/E and competed in three rallies in the 1977 World Rally Championship season, but retired from all three. In 1987, he was signed by GM Euro Sport for a programme that included three WRC rounds, scoring his first points by finishing tenth on Rallye Sanremo. In 1988, he again did two WRC rounds, winning Rally New Zealand. He did three more WRC events for Opel in 1989, also winning the German championship. In 1993 he did three rounds in an Audi S2 entered by SMS, finishing seventh in Sweden and fifth in Australia, his final WRC event.

== WRC victories ==
#	Event	Season	Co-driver	Car
1	18th Rothmans Rally of New Zealand	1988	Ferdi Hinterleitner	Opel Kadett GSI
