= Markku Alén =

Finnish rally driver (born 1951)

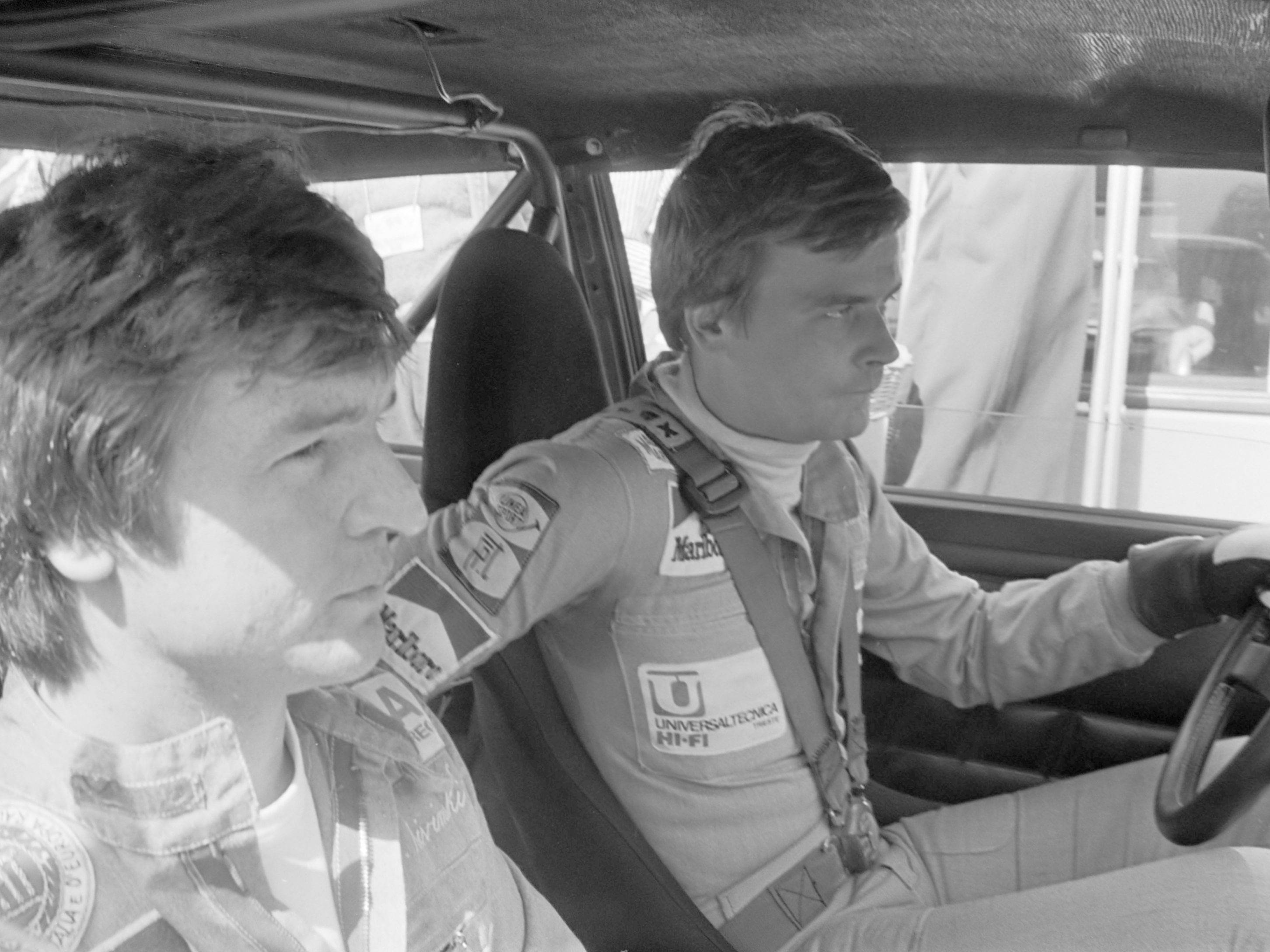
- Markku Alén (r.) and navigator Ilkka Kivimäki (1976)

Personal information
- Nationality: (Finland) Finnish
- Full name: Markku Allan Alén
- Born: 15 February 1951 (age 75); Helsinki, Finland

World Rally Championship record
- Years active: 1973–1993, 2001
- Co-driver: (Finland) Juhani Toivonen (Finland) Ilkka Kivimäki (Finland) Atso Aho (United Kingdom) Paul White (Finland) Ilkka Riipinen
- Teams: Ford, Fiat, Lancia, Subaru, Toyota
- Rallies: 129
- Championships: 1 (1978)
- Rally wins: 19
- Podiums: 56
- Stage wins: 801
- Total points: 840
- First rally: 1973 1000 Lakes Rally
- First win: 1975 Rally Portugal
- Last win: 1988 RAC Rally
- Last rally: 2001 Rally Finland

Markku Allan Alén (born 15 February 1951) is a Finnish former rally and race car driver. He drove for Fiat, Lancia, Subaru and Toyota in the World Rally Championship, and held the record for most stage wins (801) in the series, until Sébastien Loeb overtook it at the 2011 Rally Catalunya. Alén's phrase "now maximum attack" became well known.

Alén never won the world championship itself, despite being for a long time the driver with the most wins to his credit. However, he did win the FIA Cup for Drivers in 1978, the precursor to the World Championship for Drivers established in 1979. In 1986, he was the world champion for eleven days, until Peugeot's appeal went through and the results of Rallye Sanremo, which Alén had won, were annulled.

== Career ==
=== Early ===
Alén's interest in motorsport came from his father, who was the 1963 Finnish champion in ice racing. Alén started his rallying career in 1969 driving a Renault 8 Gordini, and finished ninth at the 1000 Lakes Rally at his first attempt. After getting a contract with the Finnish Volvo importer to drive the Volvo 142, he finished third at the 1000 Lakes in 1971 and 1972. At his World Rally Championship debut at the 1973 1000 Lakes Rally, he took second place behind Timo Mäkinen.

=== Fiat (1974–81) ===
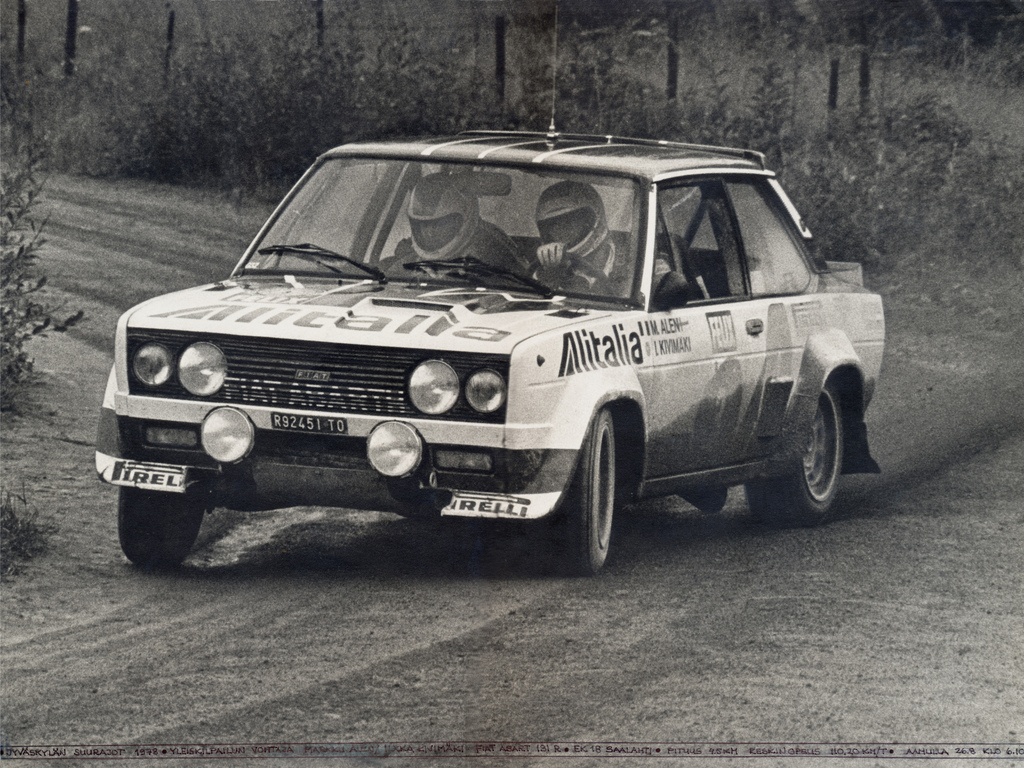
Alén drives a Fiat 131 Abarth at the 1978 1000 Lakes Rally.

Alén's performances at his home event caught the attention of both Fiat and Ford. With Ford's Escort RS 1600, he established his reputation as a hard-charger on the 1973 RAC Rally by finishing third, despite rolling his car on the first day and dropping to 178th place. This resulted in a "dream contract" with Fiat, with a very large salary. Alén also became the first rally driver to be assigned a personal fitness program.

In 1974 and 1975, Alén drove the Fiat 124 Abarth Rallye, achieving several podiums and then his debut WRC win at the 1975 Rally Portugal. During the 1976 season, Fiat debuted the new Fiat 131 Abarth, which would prove to be a big improvement over its predecessor. Alén won the 1976 1000 Lakes and the 1977 Rally Portugal, and helped Fiat to their first manufacturers' title in 1977.

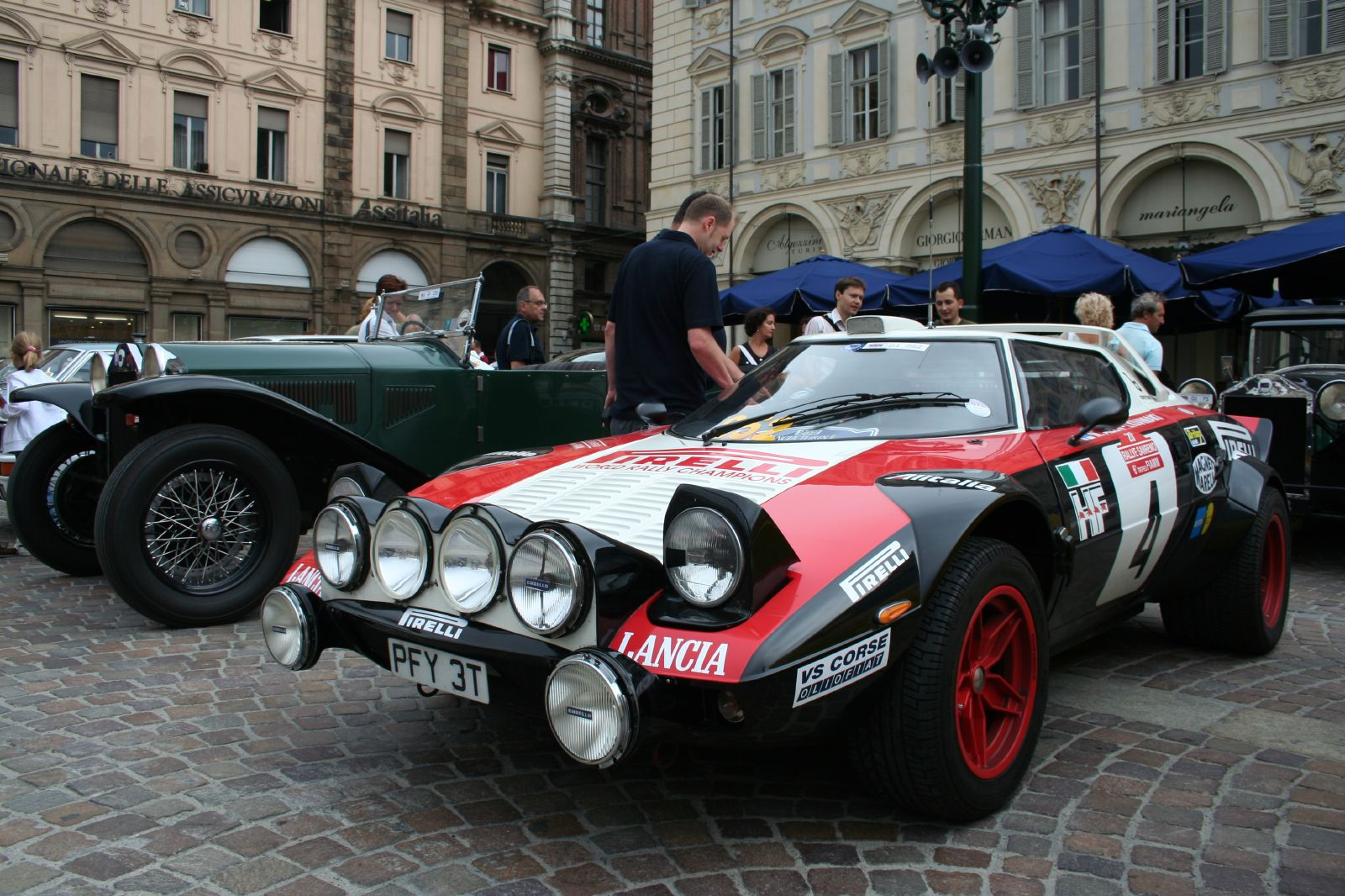
Alén's 1978 Rallye Sanremo -winning Lancia Stratos HF.

Then in 1978, Alén took the car to two wins and five consecutive podiums. In the Rallye Sanremo, he debuted in Alitalia Fiat's Lancia Stratos HF and won his third world rally of the season. These performances brought him the FIA Cup for Drivers title, well ahead of main rivals Jean-Pierre Nicolas and Hannu Mikkola, and Fiat their second manufacturers' title. Alén continued with Fiat for the next three years, taking a win each season.

=== Lancia (1982–89) ===
After Fiat wound up their works rally team, Alén moved to the related Lancia team. In 1982 he debuted the marque's first of two Group B category homologated models, the Lancia 037, a rear-wheel drive car which was, in consequence, a particular performer on the championship's asphalt rounds. Alén's several wins with it in 1983 helped Lancia narrowly pip Audi and their four-wheel drive long wheelbase Quattro to that year's constructors' championship. Indeed, it was Alén who was responsible for the car's final victory, on the 1984 Tour de Corse, in a year in which Audi retook both of the title honours, before it was replaced by the four-wheel drive Lancia Delta S4 from the final round, in Great Britain, of the 1985 season.

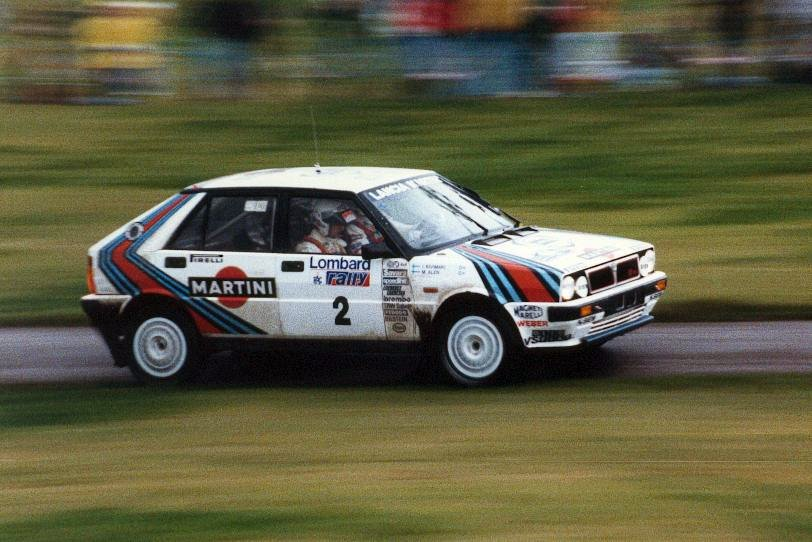
Alén driving his Delta HF 4WD at the 1987 RAC Rally.

Having become unequivocal team leader in the aftermath of teammate Henri Toivonen's death in Corsica the following year, Alén narrowly lost the 1986 World Rally Championship to rival driver, Peugeot 205 Turbo 16 E2 pilot Juha Kankkunen. Late in the season, Alén had been victorious on the Rallye Sanremo only after Kankkunen's Peugeot team was excluded by the organisers on a controversial technicality. Peugeot subsequently appealed the exclusion to the FISA, which eventually annulled the results of the rally, stripping Alén of the World Championship title which he had held for just eleven days, which led to Alén famously boycotting the 1987 Monte Carlo Rally.

Alén remained at Lancia after the abolition of Group B at the end of 1986, and adapted successfully to the replacement Group A formula. He won three events in the Lancia Delta HF 4WD in 1987, but lost his chance to take second place in the world driver's championship after rolling his car in front of the TV cameras on the 1987 RAC Rally. He won another three events the following year, culminating in an emotional first victory in the RAC, an event he had been trying to win for fifteen years. It was to be his last world championship victory.

=== Later career ===
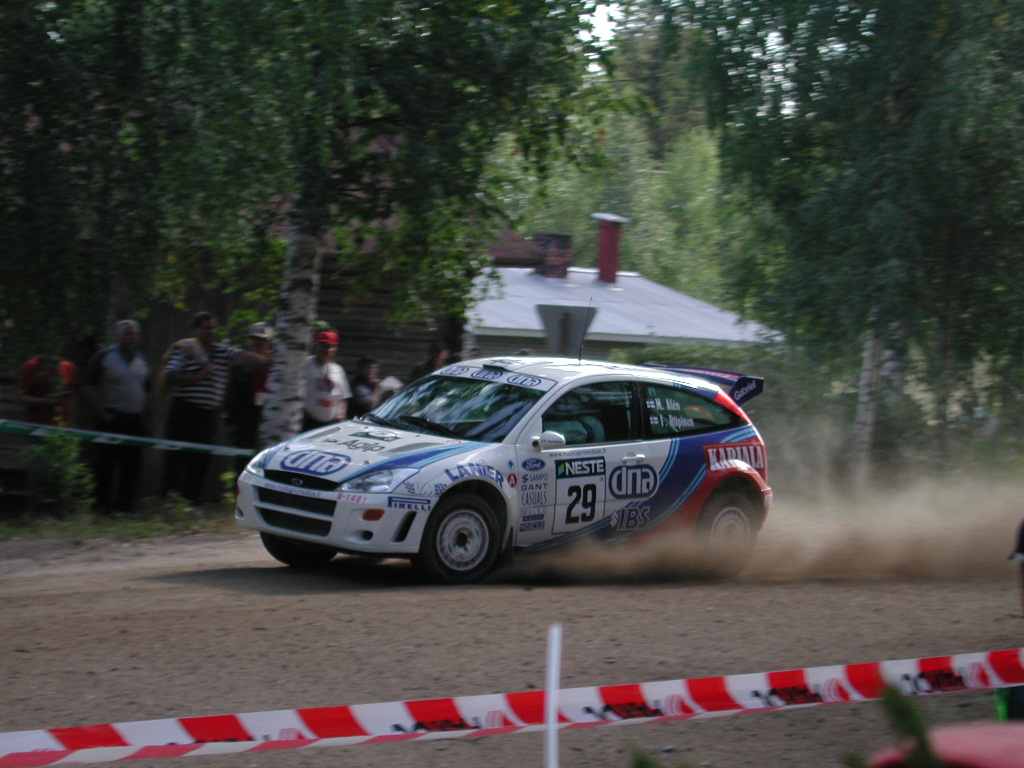
Alén with a Ford Focus WRC at the 2001 Rally Finland.

In 1990, Alén moved to the burgeoning Prodrive-run Subaru World Rally Team, and was responsible for many of the Subaru Legacy's early successes, including fourth in the 1990 1000 Lakes Rally, and a third and two fourth places the following season. For 1992 he moved to the Toyota team, but found himself playing very much a supporting role to Carlos Sainz. The 1993 season found Alén without a full-time position, and he drove for Toyota and Subaru early in the season, taking second place for Toyota in the Safari Rally and fourth for Subaru in Portugal. Along with fellow veteran and 1981 World Champion Ari Vatanen, he drove the Subaru Impreza on its debut event, the 1000 Lakes Rally. Unfortunately for Alén, he crashed on the first stage of the event. This effectively marked the end of his career as a top-line rally driver.

Alén drove two races of the International Touring Car Championship of 1995 for Alfa Romeo, driving the same number of races in DTM earlier that year. He also drove in Trophy Andros in 1996 and 1997. To celebrate his 50th birthday in 2001, he entered that year's Neste Rally Finland in August, finishing in a respectable 16th place overall with a Ford Focus WRC. He has also participated in the Paris-Dakar rally twice in the truck class, one of which was for Iveco in 2006 alongside team-mate Miki Biasion. He competed in the event in a car for the manufacturer Izusu team in 2007. His son Anton Alén, drove a Super 2000 class Fiat Punto in the Intercontinental Rally Challenge series.

In March 2010, Luca di Montezemolo hired Alén as a Ferrari test driver. He started with snow tests on the Ferrari 458 Italia.

== Complete WRC results ==
| Year | Entrant | Car | 1 | 2 | 3 | 4 | 5 | 6 | 7 | 8 | 9 | 10 | 11 | 12 | 13 | 14 | WDC | Points |
|---|---|---|---|---|---|---|---|---|---|---|---|---|---|---|---|---|---|---|
| 1973 | Oy Volvo-Auto Ab | Volvo 142 | MON | SWE | POR | KEN | MOR | GRE | POL | FIN; 2 | AUT | ITA | USA | | FRA | | N/A | N/A |
| 1973 | Motorcraft | Ford Escort RS1600 | | | | | | | | | | | | GBR; 3 | | | N/A | N/A |
| 1974 | Fiat S.p.A. | Fiat 124 Abarth Spider | POR; 3 | KEN | FIN; 3 | ITA; Ret | CAN; Ret | USA; 2 | | FRA; Ret | | | | | | | N/A | N/A |
| 1974 | Ford Motor Company Ltd | Ford Escort RS1600 | | | | | | | GBR; Ret | | | | | | | | N/A | N/A |
| 1975 | Fiat S.p.A. | Fiat 124 Abarth Spider | MON; 3 | SWE; 6 | KEN | GRE | MOR | POR; 1 | | ITA; Ret | FRA | GBR; Ret | | | | | N/A | N/A |
| 1975 | Datsun | Datsun Violet 160J | | | | | | | FIN; Ret | | | | | | | | N/A | N/A |
| 1976 | Fiat S.p.A. | Fiat 124 Abarth Spider | MON; 6 | SWE | POR | KEN | GRE | | | | | | | | | | N/A | N/A |
| 1976 | Fiat S.p.A. | Fiat 131 Abarth | | | | | | MOR; 12 | | ITA; Ret | FRA | GBR; Ret | | | | | N/A | N/A |
| 1976 | Autonovo Oy | Fiat 131 Abarth | | | | | | | FIN; 1 | | | | | | | | N/A | N/A |
| 1977 | Fiat S.p.A. | Fiat 131 Abarth | MON; 54 | SWE; Ret | POR; 1 | KEN | NZL; 3 | GRE; Ret | | CAN; Ret | ITA | FRA | GBR; Ret | | | | NC | 0 |
| 1977 | Autonovo Oy | Fiat 131 Abarth | | | | | | | FIN; Ret | | | | | | | | NC | 0 |
| 1978 | Alitalia Fiat | Fiat 131 Abarth | MON | SWE; 3 | KEN | POR; 1 | GRE; 2 | FIN; 1 | CAN; 2 | | | | | | | | 1st | 52 |
| 1978 | Alitalia Fiat | Lancia Stratos HF | | | | | | | | ITA; 1 | CIV | FRA | GBR; Ret | | | | 1st | 52 |
| 1979 | Alitalia Fiat | Fiat 131 Abarth | MON; 3 | SWE; 4 | POR | KEN; 3 | GRE | NZL | FIN; 1 | CAN | ITA; 6 | FRA | | | | | 3rd | 68 |
| 1979 | Lancia GB | Lancia Stratos HF | | | | | | | | | | | GBR; 5 | CIV | | | 3rd | 68 |
| 1980 | Fiat Italia | Fiat 131 Abarth | MON; Ret | SWE | POR; 2 | KEN | GRE; 3 | ARG; Ret | | | | | | | | | 6th | 47 |
| 1980 | Fiat Rally / ASA | Fiat 131 Abarth | | | | | | | FIN; 1 | NZL | | | | | | | 6th | 47 |
| 1980 | 4 Rombi Corse | Fiat 131 Abarth | | | | | | | | | ITA; Ret | FRA | GBR | CIV | | | 6th | 47 |
| 1981 | Fiat Auto Torino | Fiat 131 Abarth | MON; 7 | SWE | POR; 1 | KEN | FRA | GRE; 2 | ARG | BRA | FIN; 2 | ITA; 9 | CIV | | | | 4th | 56 |
| 1981 | Team Chardonnet | Lancia Stratos HF | | | | | | | | | | | | GBR; Ret | | | 4th | 56 |
| 1982 | Martini Lancia | Lancia Rally 037 | MON | SWE | POR | KEN | FRA; 9 | GRE; Ret | NZL | BRA | FIN; Ret | ITA; Ret | CIV | GBR; 4 | | | 21st | 12 |
| 1983 | Martini Lancia | Lancia Rally 037 | MON; 2 | SWE | POR; 4 | KEN | FRA; 1 | GRE; 2 | NZL | ARG; 5 | FIN; 3 | ITA; 1 | CIV | GBR | | | 3rd | 100 |
| 1984 | Martini Lancia | Lancia Rally 037 Evolution 2 | MON; 8 | SWE | POR; 2 | KEN; 4 | FRA; 1 | GRE; 3 | NZL; 2 | ARG | FIN; 2 | ITA; Ret | CIV | GBR | | | 3rd | 90 |
| 1985 | Martini Lancia | Lancia Rally 037 Evolution 2 | MON | SWE | POR | KEN; Ret | FRA; Ret | GRE | NZL | ARG | FIN; 3 | ITA; 4 | CIV | | | | 7th | 37 |
| 1985 | Martini Lancia | Lancia Delta S4 | | | | | | | | | | | | GBR; 2 | | | 7th | 37 |
| 1986 | Martini Lancia | Lancia Delta S4 | MON; Ret | SWE; 2 | POR; Ret | | FRA; Ret | GRE; Ret | NZL; 2 | ARG; 2 | FIN; 3 | CIV | ITA; 1 | GBR; 2 | USA; 1 | | 2nd | 104 |
| 1986 | Martini Lancia | Lancia Rally 037 Evolution 2 | | | | KEN; 3 | | | | | | | | | | | 2nd | 104 |
| 1987 | Martini Lancia | Lancia Delta HF 4WD | MON | SWE; 5 | POR; 1 | KEN | FRA | GRE; 1 | USA; 3 | NZL | ARG | FIN; 1 | CIV | ITA; Ret | GBR; 5 | | 3rd | 88 |
| 1988 | Martini Lancia | Lancia Delta HF 4WD | MON | SWE; 1 | | | | | | | | | | | | | 2nd | 86 |
| 1988 | Martini Lancia | Lancia Delta Integrale | | | POR; 6 | KEN | FRA | GRE; 4 | USA | NZL | ARG | FIN; 1 | CIV | ITA; 4 | GBR; 1 | | 2nd | 86 |
| 1989 | Martini Lancia | Lancia Delta Integrale | SWE | MON | POR; 2 | KEN | FRA | GRE | NZL | ARG | FIN; Ret | AUS; 3 | ITA | CIV | GBR | | 9th | 27 |
| 1990 | Subaru Technica International | Subaru Legacy RS | MON | POR | KEN; Ret | FRA | GRE; Ret | NZL | ARG | FIN; 4 | AUS | ITA; Ret | CIV | GBR; Ret | | | 20th | 10 |
| 1991 | Subaru Rally Team Europe | Subaru Legacy RS | MON | SWE; 3 | POR; 5 | KEN | FRA | GRE; Ret | NZL; 4 | ARG | FIN; Ret | AUS; 4 | ITA | CIV | ESP | GBR; Ret | 8th | 40 |
| 1992 | Marlboro Toyota Team Europe | Toyota Celica Turbo 4WD | MON; Ret | | POR; 4 | | | GRE; Ret | NZL | ARG | FIN; 3 | AUS | ITA | CIV | ESP | GBR; 4 | 5th | 50 |
| 1992 | Toyota Team Sweden | Toyota Celica GT-Four ST165 | | SWE; 4 | | | | | | | | | | | | | 5th | 50 |
| 1992 | Toyota Team Kenya | Toyota Celica Turbo 4WD | | | | KEN; 5 | FRA | | | | | | | | | | 5th | 50 |
| 1993 | 555 Subaru World Rally Team | Subaru Legacy RS | MON | SWE | POR; 4 | | | | | | | | | | | | 11th | 25 |
| 1993 | Toyota Castrol Team | Toyota Celica Turbo 4WD | | | | KEN; 2 | FRA | GRE | ARG | NZL | | | | | | | 11th | 25 |
| 1993 | 555 Subaru World Rally Team | Subaru Impreza 555 | | | | | | | | | FIN; Ret | AUS | ITA | ESP | GBR | | 11th | 25 |
| 2001 | Blue Rose Team | Ford Focus WRC | MON | SWE | POR | ESP | ARG | CYP | GRE | KEN | FIN; 16 | NZL | ITA | FRA | AUS | GBR | NC | 0 |

== WRC wins ==
| # | Event | Season | Co-driver | Car |
|---|---|---|---|---|
| 1 | 9º Rallye de Portugal Vinho do Porto | 1975 | Ilkka Kivimäki | Fiat Abarth 124 Rallye |
| 2 | (Finland) 26th 1000 Lakes Rally | 1976 | Ilkka Kivimäki | Fiat Abarth 131 Rallye |
| 3 | 11º Rallye de Portugal Vinho do Porto | 1977 | Ilkka Kivimäki | Fiat Abarth 131 Rallye |
| 4 | (Finland) 28th 1000 Lakes Rally | 1978 | Ilkka Kivimäki | Fiat Abarth 131 Rallye |
| 5 | 12º Rallye de Portugal Vinho do Porto | 1978 | Ilkka Kivimäki | Fiat Abarth 131 Rallye |
| 6 | (Italy) 20º Rallye Sanremo | 1978 | Ilkka Kivimäki | Lancia Stratos HF |
| 7 | (Finland) 29th 1000 Lakes Rally | 1979 | Ilkka Kivimäki | Fiat Abarth 131 Rallye |
| 8 | (Finland) 30th 1000 Lakes Rally | 1980 | Ilkka Kivimäki | Fiat Abarth 131 Rallye |
| 9 | 15º Rallye de Portugal Vinho do Porto | 1981 | Ilkka Kivimäki | Fiat Abarth 131 Rallye |
| 10 | 27éme Tour De Corse – Rallye de France | 1983 | Ilkka Kivimäki | Lancia Rally 037 |
| 11 | (Italy) 25º Rallye Sanremo | 1983 | Ilkka Kivimäki | Lancia Rally 037 |
| 12 | 28ème Tour de Corse – Rallye de France | 1984 | Ilkka Kivimäki | Lancia Rally 037 |
| 13 | (United States) 21st Olympus Rally | 1986 | Ilkka Kivimäki | Lancia Delta S4 |
| 14 | 21º Rallye de Portugal Vinho do Porto | 1987 | Ilkka Kivimäki | Lancia Delta HF 4WD |
| 15 | (Greece) 34th Acropolis Rally | 1987 | Ilkka Kivimäki | Lancia Delta HF 4WD |
| 16 | (Finland) 37th 1000 Lakes Rally | 1987 | Ilkka Kivimäki | Lancia Delta HF 4WD |
| 17 | (Sweden) 38th International Swedish Rally | 1988 | Ilkka Kivimäki | Lancia Delta HF 4WD |
| 18 | (Finland) 38th 1000 Lakes Rally | 1988 | Ilkka Kivimäki | Lancia Delta Integrale |
| 19 | (United Kingdom) 37th Lombard RAC Rally | 1988 | Ilkka Kivimäki | Lancia Delta Integrale |

== 24 Hours of Le Mans results ==
| Year | Team | Co-Drivers | Car | Class | Laps | Pos. | Class Pos. |
|---|---|---|---|---|---|---|---|
| 1980 | (Italy) Scuderia Lancia Corse | (Italy) Gianfranco Brancatelli (Italy) Piercarlo Ghinzani | Lancia Montecarlo Turbo | Gr. 5 SP 2.0 | 26 | DNF | DNF |

Awards and achievements
| Preceded by Juha Kankkunen | Autosport; International Rally Driver Award; 1988 | Succeeded by Miki Biasion |
Sporting positions
| Preceded by Sandro Munari | FIA Cup for Rally Drivers champion 1978 | Succeeded by Björn Waldegård (World Rally Championship) |
Records
| Preceded by Stig Blomqvist; 26 years, 203 days (1973 Swedish Rally) | Youngest rally winner 24 years, 156 days (1975 Rallye de Portugal) | Succeeded by Henri Toivonen; 24 years, 86 days (1980 RAC Rally) |
| Preceded by Hannu Mikkola; 18 wins (1973–1993) | Most rally wins 19 wins, 19th at the 1988 RAC Rally | Succeeded by Juha Kankkunen; 23 wins, 20th at the 1993 RAC Rally |
