= 2026 Rally Italia Sardegna =

23rd edition of the Rally Italia Sardegna

2026 Rally Italia Sardegna Rally Italia Sardegna 2026
Round 13 of 13 in the 2026 World Rally Championship
← Previous event
- The event this year is the final edition of the Rally Italia Sardegna.
- Host country: Italy
- Rally base: Alghero, Sassari
- Dates run: 1 – 4 October 2026
- Start location: Alghero, Sassari
- Finish location: Alghero, Sassari
- Stages: 17 (306.92 km; 190.71 miles)
- Stage surface: Gravel
- Transport distance: 1,319.87 km (820.13 miles)
- Overall distance: 1,626.79 km (1,010.84 miles)

Statistics
- Crews registered: 60
- Crews: 57 at start, 44 at finish

Overall results
- Overall winner: (Sweden) Oliver Solberg (United Kingdom) Elliott Edmondson (Japan) Toyota Gazoo Racing WRT; 3:24:57.0
- Sunday Accumulated leader: (Finland) Sami Pajari (Finland) Marko Salminen (Japan) Toyota Gazoo Racing WRT2; 42:21.3
- Power Stage winner: (Belgium) Thierry Neuville (Belgium) Martijn Wydaeghe (South Korea) Hyundai Shell Mobis WRT; 4:54.2

Support category results
- WRC-2 winner: (Finland) Roope Korhonen (Finland) Anssi Viinikka (Finland) Rautio Motorsport; 3:37:07.4
- WRC-3 winner: (France) Eric Royère (Belgium) Maxime Andernack; 4:17:49.2

The 2026 Rally Italia Sardegna was a motor racing event for rally cars held over four days from 1 to 4 October 2026. It marked the twenty-third running of the Rally Italia Sardegna, and was the thirteenth round of the 2026 World Rally Championship, 2026 WRC2 Championship and 2026 WRC3 Championship. It subsequently became the season finale following the removal of the 2026 Rally Saudi Arabia. The 2026 event is set to be based in Alghero in the province of Sassari, and is set to be consisted of seventeen special stages, covering a total competitive distance of 306.92 km (190.71 mi).

Sébastien Ogier and Vincent Landais were the defending rally winners, and their team, Toyota Gazoo Racing WRT, were the defending manufacturer's winners. Roberto Daprà and Luca Guglielmetti were the defending rally winners in the WRC2 championship. Matteo Fontana and Alessandro Arnaboldi were the defending rally winners in the WRC3 championship.

Oliver Solberg and Elliott Edmondson won their third rally of the season, and Toyota successfully defended their manufacturer's title. Elfyn Evans and Scott Martin became the 2026 world champions. Roope Korhonen and Anssi Viinikka were the winners in the WRC2 category. Eric Royère and Maxime Andernack were the winners in the WRC3 category.

== Background ==
=== Entry list ===
The following crews were entered into the rally. The event was opened to crews competing in the World Rally Championship, its support categories, the WRC2 Championship, the WRC3 Championship and privateer entries that are not registered to score points in any championship. Eleven crews were entered under Rally1 regulations, as were thirty-two Rally2 crews in the WRC2 Championship and three Rally3 crews in the WRC3 Championship.

Rally1 entries competing in the World Rally Championship
No.	Driver	Co-Driver	Entrant	Car	Championship eligibility	Tyre
1	(France) Sébastien Ogier	(France) Vincent Landais	(Japan) Toyota Gazoo Racing WRT	Toyota GR Yaris Rally1	Driver, Co-driver, Manufacturer	H
5	(Finland) Sami Pajari	(Finland) Marko Salminen	(Japan) Toyota Gazoo Racing WRT2	Toyota GR Yaris Rally1	Driver, Co-driver, Manufacturer, Team	H
6	(Spain) Dani Sordo	(Spain) Patricia Sáiz	(South Korea) Hyundai Shell Mobis WRT	Hyundai i20 N Rally1	Driver, Co-driver, Manufacturer	H
11	(Belgium) Thierry Neuville	(Belgium) Martijn Wydaeghe	(South Korea) Hyundai Shell Mobis WRT	Hyundai i20 N Rally1	Driver, Co-driver, Manufacturer	H
16	(France) Adrien Fourmaux	(France) Alexandre Coria	(South Korea) Hyundai Shell Mobis WRT	Hyundai i20 N Rally1	Driver, Co-driver, Manufacturer	H
18	(Japan) Takamoto Katsuta	(Republic of Ireland) Aaron Johnston	(Japan) Toyota Gazoo Racing WRT	Toyota GR Yaris Rally1	Driver, Co-driver	H
22	(Latvia) Mārtiņš Sesks	(Latvia) Renārs Francis	(United Kingdom) M-Sport Ford WRT	Ford Puma Rally1	Driver, Co-driver	H
33	(United Kingdom) Elfyn Evans	(United Kingdom) Scott Martin	(Japan) Toyota Gazoo Racing WRT	Toyota GR Yaris Rally1	Driver, Co-driver, ~~Manufacturer~~	H
55	(Republic of Ireland) Josh McErlean	(Republic of Ireland) Eoin Treacy	(United Kingdom) M-Sport Ford WRT	Ford Puma Rally1	Driver, Co-driver, Manufacturer	H
95	(Republic of Ireland) Jon Armstrong	(Republic of Ireland) Shane Byrne	(United Kingdom) M-Sport Ford WRT	Ford Puma Rally1	Driver, Co-driver, Manufacturer	H
99	(Sweden) Oliver Solberg	(United Kingdom) Elliott Edmondson	(Japan) Toyota Gazoo Racing WRT	Toyota GR Yaris Rally1	Driver, Co-driver, Manufacturer	H

Rally2 entries competing in the WRC2 Championship
No.	Driver	Co-Driver	Entrant	Car	Championship eligibility	Tyre
20	(Estonia) Robert Virves	(Estonia) Jakko Viilo	(Germany) Toksport WRT 2	Škoda Fabia RS Rally2	Challenger Driver, Challenger Co-driver, Team	H
21	(Finland) Roope Korhonen	(Finland) Anssi Viinikka	(Finland) Rautio Motorsport	Toyota GR Yaris Rally2	Challenger Driver, Challenger Co-driver	H
23	(Finland) Teemu Suninen	(Finland) Janni Hussi	(Finland) Teemu Suninen	Toyota GR Yaris Rally2	Driver, Co-driver	H
24	(France) Léo Rossel	(France) Guillaume Mercoiret	(France) 2C Junior Team	Lancia Ypsilon Rally2 HF Integrale	Challenger Driver, Challenger Co-driver, Team	H
25	(Norway) Andreas Mikkelsen	(Norway) Jørn Listerud	(Germany) Toksport WRT 2	Škoda Fabia RS Rally2	Driver, Co-driver, Team	H
26	(Italy) Roberto Daprà	(Italy) Luca Guglielmetti	(Italy) Roberto Daprà	Škoda Fabia RS Rally2	Challenger Driver, Challenger Co-driver	H
27	(United Kingdom) Gus Greensmith	(Sweden) Jonas Andersson	(United Kingdom) Gus Greensmith	Toyota GR Yaris Rally2	Driver, Co-driver	H
28	(Finland) Emil Lindholm	(Brazil) Gabriel Morales	(Germany) Toksport WRT	Škoda Fabia RS Rally2	Driver, Co-driver	H
29	(Paraguay) Fabrizio Zaldivar	(Italy) Marcelo Der Ohannesian	(Paraguay) Fabrizio Zaldivar	Škoda Fabia RS Rally2	Challenger Driver, Challenger Co-driver	H
30	(Spain) Jan Solans	(Spain) Rodrigo Sanjuan de Eusebio	(Spain) PH.Ph	Toyota GR Yaris Rally2	Challenger Driver, Challenger Co-driver	H
32	(Italy) Giovanni Trentin	(Italy) Pietro Elia Ometto	(Italy) MT Racing SRL	Škoda Fabia RS Rally2	Challenger Driver, Challenger Co-driver	H
34	(France) Pablo Sarrazin	(France) Yannick Roche	(France) Pablo Sarrazin	Lancia Ypsilon Rally2 HF Integrale	Challenger Driver, Challenger Co-driver	H
35	(Poland) Kajetan Kajetanowicz	(Poland) Maciej Szczepaniak	(Poland) Kajetan Kajetanowicz	Toyota GR Yaris Rally2	Challenger Driver, Challenger Co-driver	H
36	(Finland) Benjamin Korhola	(Finland) Kristian Temonen	(Finland) Benjamin Korhola	Škoda Fabia RS Rally2	Challenger Driver, Challenger Co-driver	H
37	(Italy) Matteo Fontana	(Italy) Alessandro Arnaboldi	(Italy) Matteo Fontana	Toyota GR Yaris Rally2	Challenger Driver, Challenger Co-driver	H
38	(United States) Conner Martell	(Italy) Alex Gelsomino	(France) 2C Junior Team	Lancia Ypsilon Rally2 HF Integrale	Challenger Driver, Challenger Co-driver, Team	H
39	(Germany) Fabio Schwarz	(Spain) Axel Coronado	(Germany) Armin Schwarz Driving Experience	Toyota GR Yaris Rally2	Challenger Driver, Challenger Co-driver	H
40	(Mexico) Alejandro Mauro	(Spain) Carla Salvat	(Mexico) Alejandro Mauro	Škoda Fabia RS Rally2	Challenger Driver, Challenger Co-driver	H
41	(Poland) Aron Domżała	(Poland) Michał Kuśnierz	(Poland) Aron Domżała	Škoda Fabia RS Rally2	Challenger Driver, Challenger Co-driver	H
42	(Italy) Simone Romagna	(Italy) Dino Lamonato	(Italy) Simone Romagna	Škoda Fabia RS Rally2	Challenger Driver, Challenger Co-driver	H
43	(Italy) Giuseppe Dettori	(Italy) Carlo Pisano	(Italy) Giuseppe Dettori	Škoda Fabia RS Rally2	Challenger Driver, Challenger Co-driver	H
44	(Mexico) Miguel Granados	(Spain) Marc Martí	(Mexico) Miguel Granados	Škoda Fabia RS Rally2	Challenger/Masters Driver, Masters Co-driver	H
45	(Turkey) Uğur Soylu	(Turkey) Mehmet Akif Yalçın	(Turkey) GP Garage My Team	Škoda Fabia RS Rally2	Challenger/Masters Driver, Challenger Co-driver	H
46	(Austria) Johannes Keferböck	(Austria) Ilka Minor	(Austria) Johannes Keferböck	Toyota GR Yaris Rally2	Challenger/Masters Driver, Masters Co-driver	H
47	(Austria) Kevin Raith	(Austria) Claudia Maier	(Austria) ZM Racing Team	Ford Fiesta Rally2	Challenger Driver, Challenger Co-driver	H
48	(Italy) Fabio Frisiero	(Italy) Danilo Fappani	(Italy) Fabio Frisiero	Škoda Fabia RS Rally2	Challenger/Masters Driver, Challenger/Masters Co-driver	H
49	(Italy) Giovanni Galleni	(Italy) Alessandro Scartabelli	(Italy) Giovanni Galleni	Škoda Fabia RS Rally2	Challenger/Masters Driver, Challenger Co-driver	H
50	(Romania) Eugen Cărăgui	(Romania) Robert Patrick Fus	(Romania) Eugen Cărăgui	Citroën C3 Rally2	Challenger Driver, Challenger Co-driver	H
51	(Italy) Sebastiano Serpelloni	(Italy) Nicola Petrin	(Italy) Sebastiano Serpelloni	Škoda Fabia R5	Challenger Driver, Challenger Co-driver	H
52	(Italy) Giuseppe Pozzo	(Italy) Pier Paolo Cottu	(Italy) Giuseppe Pozzo	Škoda Fabia Rally2 evo	Challenger Driver, Challenger Co-driver	H
53	(Italy) Francesco Tali	(Italy) Gianina Libera	(Italy) Francesco Tali	Ford Fiesta Rally2	Challenger Driver, Challenger Co-driver	H
54	(Italy) Carlo Covi	(Italy) Michela Lorigiola	(Italy) Carlo Covi	Škoda Fabia RS Rally2	Challenger Driver, Challenger Co-driver	H

Rally3 entries competing in the WRC3 Championship
No.	Driver	Co-Driver	Entrant	Car	Class eligibility	Tyre
57	(Greece) Georgios Vasilakis	(Republic of Ireland) Allan Harryman	(Greece) Georgios Vasilakis	Ford Fiesta Rally3	WRC3, Masters Driver, Masters Co-Driver	H
58	(Italy) Alex Lorenzato	(Italy) Nicolò Lazzarini	(Italy) Alex Lorenzato	Ford Fiesta Rally3	WRC3	H
72	(France) Eric Royère	(Belgium) Maxime Andernack	(France) Eric Royère	Ford Fiesta Rally3	WRC3	H

Other major entries
No.	Driver	Co-Driver	Entrant	Car	Championship eligibility	Tyre
31	(Japan) Yuki Yamamoto	(Republic of Ireland) James Fulton	(Finland) Printsport	Toyota GR Yaris Rally2	—N/a	H
59	(Argentina) Luis Arceluz	(Argentina) Ezequiel Queralt	(Argentina) Luis Arceluz	Toyota GR Yaris Rally2	Masters Driver, Masters Co-driver	H

=== Itinerary ===
All dates and times are CEST (UTC+2).

Date	No.	Time span	Stage name	Distance
1 October	—	After 9:01	Monte Baranta [Shakedown]	3.27 km
1 October		After 15:00	Official Start, Alghero	—N/a
1 October	SS1	After 16:05	Ittiri Arena Show	2.08 km
1 October		17:00 – 17:15	Service A, Alghero	—N/a
2 October	SS2	After 8:01	Tula – Erula 1	18.77 km
2 October	SS3	After 9:02	Su Filigosu – Lerno 1	17.83 km
2 October	SS4	After 10:08	Monti di Ala' – Lerno 1	23.18 km
2 October		12:10 – 12:40	Regroup, Alghero	—N/a
2 October		12:40 – 13:10	Service B, Alghero	—N/a
2 October	SS5	After 14:31	Tula – Erula 2	18.77 km
2 October	SS6	After 15:32	Su Filigosu – Lerno 2	17.83 km
2 October	SS7	After 16:38	Monti di Ala' – Lerno 2	23.18 km
2 October		18:50 – 19:35	Flexi service C, Alghero	—N/a
3 October	SS8	After 8:01	Lerno – Monti di Ala' 1	24.14 km
3 October	SS9	After 9:10	Coiluna – Loelle 1	24.83 km
3 October	SS10	After 10:07	Solorche' 1	12.86 km
3 October		11:54 – 12:13	Regroup, Alghero	—N/a
3 October		12:13 – 12:43	Service D, Alghero	—N/a
3 October	SS11	After 14:31	Lerno – Monti di Ala' 2	24.14 km
3 October	SS12	After 15:40	Coiluna – Loelle 2	24.83 km
3 October	SS13	After 16:37	Solorche' 2	12.86 km
3 October		18:35 – 19:20	Flexi service E, Alghero	—N/a
4 October	SS14	After 8:31	Osilo – Tergu 1	23.71 km
4 October	SS15	After 10:05	Sassari – Argentiera 1	7.10 km
4 October		11:05 – 11:15	Regroup, Sassari	—N/a
4 October	SS16	After 11:38	Osilo – Tergu 2	23.71 km
4 October		12:38 – 13:23	Regroup, Porto Torres	—N/a
4 October		13:23 – 13:38	Tyre fitting zone, Porto Torres	—N/a
4 October	SS17	After 14:15	Sassari – Argentiera 2 [Power Stage]	7.10 km
4 October		After 14:15	Finish, Alghero	—N/a
4 October		After 17:00	Podium ceremony	—N/a

== Report ==
=== WRC Rally1 ===
==== Classification ====
Position		No.	Driver	Co-driver	Entrant	Car	Time	Difference	Points			
Event	Class	No.	Driver	Co-driver	Entrant	Car	Time	Difference	Event	Sunday	Stage	Total
1	1	99	Oliver Solberg	Elliott Edmondson	Toyota Gazoo Racing WRT	Toyota GR Yaris Rally1	3:24:57.0	0.0	25	4	0	29
2	2	1	Sébastien Ogier	Julien Ingrassia	Toyota Gazoo Racing WRT	Toyota GR Yaris Rally1	3:25:54.6	+57.6	17	1	0	18
3	3	5	Sami Pajari	Marko Salminen	Toyota Gazoo Racing WRT2	Toyota GR Yaris Rally1	3:26:34.4	+1:37.4	15	5	4	24
4	4	16	Adrien Fourmaux	Alexandre Coria	Hyundai Shell Mobis WRT	Hyundai i20 N Rally1	3:27:35.6	+2:38.6	12	3	1	16
5	5	33	Elfyn Evans	Scott Martin	Toyota Gazoo Racing WRT	Toyota GR Yaris Rally1	3:29:45.1	+4:48.1	10	0	3	13
6	6	18	Takamoto Katsuta	Aaron Johnston	Toyota Gazoo Racing WRT	Toyota GR Yaris Rally1	3:30:59.4	+6:02.4	8	2	2	12
7	7	95	Jon Armstrong	Shane Byrne	M-Sport Ford WRT	Ford Puma Rally1	3:32:29.2	+7:32.2	6	0	0	6
15	8	11	Thierry Neuville	Martijn Wydaeghe	Hyundai Shell Mobis WRT	Hyundai i20 N Rally1	3:55:41.0	+30:44.0	0	0	5	5
18	9	55	Mārtiņš Sesks	Renārs Francis	M-Sport Ford WRT	Ford Puma Rally1	4:01:58.4	+37:01.4	0	0	0	0
22	10	55	Josh McErlean	Eoin Treacy	M-Sport Ford WRT	Ford Puma Rally1	4:12:25.5	+47:28.5	0	0	0	0
Retired SS9		6	Dani Sordo	Patricia Sáiz	Hyundai Shell Mobis WRT	Hyundai i20 N Rally1	Medical reasons		0	0	0	0

==== Special stages ====
Stage	Winners	Car	Time	Class leaders
SD	Neuville / Wydaeghe	Hyundai i20 N Rally1	2:30.3	—N/a
SS1	Solberg / Edmondson	Toyota GR Yaris Rally1	2:01.4	Solberg / Edmondson
SS2	Ogier / Landais	Toyota GR Yaris Rally1	15:20.3	Fourmaux / Coria
SS3	Neuville / Wydaeghe	Hyundai i20 N Rally1	11:22.1	Fourmaux / Coria
SS4	Solberg / Edmondson	Toyota GR Yaris Rally1	15:09.9	Fourmaux / Coria
SS5	Fourmaux / Coria	Hyundai i20 N Rally1	15:03.7	Fourmaux / Coria
SS6	Neuville / Wydaeghe	Hyundai i20 N Rally1	11:09.1	Fourmaux / Coria
SS7	Neuville / Wydaeghe	Hyundai i20 N Rally1	14:43.9	Neuville / Wydaeghe
SS8	Neuville / Wydaeghe	Hyundai i20 N Rally1	13:54.5	Neuville / Wydaeghe
SS9	Solberg / Edmondson	Toyota GR Yaris Rally1	15:39.0	Neuville / Wydaeghe
SS10	Solberg / Edmondson	Toyota GR Yaris Rally1	9:08.1	Solberg / Edmondson
SS11	Ogier / Landais	Toyota GR Yaris Rally1	13:44.2	Solberg / Edmondson
SS12	Ogier / Landais	Toyota GR Yaris Rally1	15:31.2	Solberg / Edmondson
SS13	Fourmaux / Coria	Hyundai i20 N Rally1	9:03.8	Solberg / Edmondson
SS14	Solberg / Edmondson	Toyota GR Yaris Rally1	16:01.7	Solberg / Edmondson
SS15	Neuville / Wydaeghe	Hyundai i20 N Rally1	5:02.0	Solberg / Edmondson
SS16	Pajari / Salminen	Toyota GR Yaris Rally1	16:07.1	Solberg / Edmondson
SS17	Neuville / Wydaeghe	Hyundai i20 N Rally1	4:54.2	Solberg / Edmondson

==== Championship standings ====
- **Bold text** indicates 2026 World Champions.

Drivers' Standings
Move	Pos.	Driver	Points
	1	**Elfyn Evans**	243
1	2	Oliver Solberg	238
1	3	Sami Pajari	237
	4	Sébastien Ogier	189
	5	Adrien Fourmaux	183

Co-drivers' Standings
Move	Pos.	Driver	Points
	1	**Scott Martin**	243
1	2	Elliott Edmondson	238
1	3	Marko Salminen	237
	4	Aaron Johnston	171
	5	Alexandre Coria	167

Manufacturers' Standings
Move	Pos.	Driver	Points
	1	**Toyota Gazoo Racing WRT**	662
	2	Hyundai Shell Mobis WRT	440
	3	Toyota Gazoo Racing WRT2	251
	4	M-Sport Ford WRT	168

=== WRC2 Rally2 ===
==== Classification ====
Position		No.	Driver	Co-driver	Entrant	Car	Time	Difference	Points	
Event	Class	No.	Driver	Co-driver	Entrant	Car	Time	Difference	Class	Event
8	1	21	Roope Korhonen	Anssi Viinikka	Rautio Motorsport	Toyota GR Yaris Rally2	3:37:07.4	0.0	25	4
9	2	20	Robert Virves	Jakko Viilo	Toksport WRT 2	Škoda Fabia RS Rally2	3:37:08.1	+0.7	17	2
10	3	26	Gus Greensmith	Jonas Andersson	Gus Greensmith	Toyota GR Yaris Rally2	3:37:59.2	+51.8	15	1
11	4	35	Kajetan Kajetanowicz	Maciej Szczepaniak	Kajetan Kajetanowicz	Toyota GR Yaris Rally2	3:38:30.9	+1:23.5	12	0
12	5	26	Roberto Daprà	Luca Guglielmetti	Roberto Daprà	Škoda Fabia RS Rally2	3:39:20.4	+2:13.0	10	0
13	6	23	Teemu Suninen	Janni Hussi	Teemu Suninen	Toyota GR Yaris Rally2	3:41:10.9	+4:03.5	8	0
14	7	40	Alejandro Mauro	Carla Salvat	Alejandro Mauro	Škoda Fabia RS Rally2	3:50:51.1	+13:43.7	6	0
16	8	47	Kevin Raith	Claudia Maier	ZM Racing Team	Ford Fiesta Rally2	4:00:50.4	+23:43.0	4	0
17	9	42	Simone Romagna	Dino Lamonato	Simone Romagna	Škoda Fabia RS Rally2	4:00:52.5	+23:45.1	2	0
19	10	32	Giovanni Trentin	Pietro Elia Ometto	MT Racing SRL	Škoda Fabia RS Rally2	4:02:52.5	+25:45.1	1	0
20	11	44	Miguel Granados	Marc Martí	Miguel Granados	Škoda Fabia RS Rally2	4:05:51.5	+28:44.1	0	0
23	12	48	Fabio Frisiero	Danilo Fappani	Fabio Frisiero	Škoda Fabia RS Rally2	4:14:31.5	+37:24.1	0	0
24	13	28	Emil Lindholm	Gabriel Morales	Toksport WRT	Škoda Fabia RS Rally2	4:16:58.1	+39:50.7	0	0
26	14	50	Eugen Cărăgui	Robert Patrick Fus	Eugen Cărăgui	Citroën C3 Rally2	4:21:24.7	+44:17.3	0	0
27	15	45	Uğur Soylu	Mehmet Akif Yalçın	GP Garage My Team	Škoda Fabia RS Rally2	4:24:49.6	+47:42.2	0	0
29	16	49	Giovanni Galleni	Alessandro Scartabelli	Giovanni Galleni	Škoda Fabia RS Rally2	4:29:28.9	+52:21.5	0	0
30	17	52	Giuseppe Pozzo	Pier Paolo Cottu	Giuseppe Pozzo	Škoda Fabia Rally2 evo	4:29:58.7	+52:51.3	0	0
33	18	34	Pablo Sarrazin	Yannick Roche	Pablo Sarrazin	Lancia Ypsilon Rally2 HF Integrale	4:36:50.6	+59:43.2	0	0
34	19	51	Sebastiano Serpelloni	Nicola Petrin	Sebastiano Serpelloni	Škoda Fabia R5	4:39:13.4	+1:02:06.0	0	0
35	20	37	Matteo Fontana	Alessandro Arnaboldi	Matteo Fontana	Toyota GR Yaris Rally2	4:41:39.5	+1:04:32.1	0	0
36	21	53	Francesco Tali	Gianina Libera	Francesco Tali	Ford Fiesta Rally2	4:42:05.2	+1:04:57.8	0	0
38	22	54	Carlo Covi	Michela Lorigiola	Carlo Covi	Škoda Fabia RS Rally2	4:47:15.5	+1:10:08.1	0	0
Retired SS16		29	Fabrizio Zaldivar	Marcelo Der Ohannesian	Fabrizio Zaldivar	Škoda Fabia RS Rally2	Mechanical		0	0
Retired SS16		41	Aron Domżała	Michał Kuśnierz	Aron Domżała	Škoda Fabia RS Rally2	Mechanical		0	0
Retired SS15		24	Léo Rossel	Guillaume Mercoiret	2C Junior Team	Lancia Ypsilon Rally2 HF Integrale	Mechanical		0	0
Retired SS12		38	Conner Martell	Alex Gelsomino	2C Junior Team	Lancia Ypsilon Rally2 HF Integrale	Accident		0	0
Retired SS9		30	Jan Solans	Rodrigo Sanjuan de Eusebio	PH.Ph	Toyota GR Yaris Rally2	Rolled		0	0
Retired SS7		43	Giuseppe Dettori	Carlo Pisano	Giuseppe Dettori	Škoda Fabia RS Rally2	Rollcage		0	0
Retired SS3		36	Benjamin Korhola	Kristian Temonen	Benjamin Korhola	Škoda Fabia RS Rally2	Mechanical		0	0
Retired SS2		39	Fabio Schwarz	Axel Coronado	Armin Schwarz Driving Experience	Toyota GR Yaris Rally2	Medical reasons		0	0

==== Special stages ====
Overall
Stage	Winners	Car	Time	Class leaders
SD	Virves / Viilo	Škoda Fabia RS Rally2	2:38.4	—N/a
SS1	Suninen / Haapala	Toyota GR Yaris Rally2	2:06.0	Suninen / Haapala
SS2	Sarrazin / Roche	Lancia Ypsilon Rally2 HF Integrale	15:52.3	Sarrazin / Roche
SS3	Suninen / Hussi	Toyota GR Yaris Rally2	11:49.5	Suninen / Hussi
SS4	Korhonen / Viinikka	Toyota GR Yaris Rally2	15:52.5	Suninen / Hussi
SS5	Suninen / Hussi	Toyota GR Yaris Rally2	15:37.8	Suninen / Hussi
SS6	Korhonen / Viinikka	Toyota GR Yaris Rally2	11:38.5	Suninen / Hussi
SS7	Virves / Viilo	Škoda Fabia RS Rally2	15:32.1	Greensmith / Andersson
SS8	Virves / Viilo	Škoda Fabia RS Rally2	14:31.3	Korhonen / Viinikka
SS9	Virves / Viilo	Škoda Fabia RS Rally2	16:33.3	Korhonen / Viinikka
SS10	Daprà / Guglielmetti	Škoda Fabia RS Rally2	9:41.6	Korhonen / Viinikka
SS11	Virves / Viilo	Škoda Fabia RS Rally2	14:25.3	Korhonen / Viinikka
SS12	Virves / Viilo	Škoda Fabia RS Rally2	16:08.1	Korhonen / Viinikka
SS13	Virves / Viilo	Škoda Fabia RS Rally2	9:27.9	Korhonen / Viinikka
SS14	Virves / Viilo	Škoda Fabia RS Rally2	16:47.5	Korhonen / Viinikka
SS15	Virves / Viilo	Škoda Fabia RS Rally2	5:23.1	Korhonen / Viinikka
SS16	Lindholm / Morales	Škoda Fabia RS Rally2	16:43.2	Korhonen / Viinikka
SS17	Virves / Viilo	Škoda Fabia RS Rally2	5:18.9	Korhonen / Viinikka

Challenger
Stage	Winners	Car	Time	Class leaders
SD	Virves / Viilo	Škoda Fabia RS Rally2	2:38.4	—N/a
SS1	Kajetanowicz / Szczepaniak	Toyota GR Yaris Rally2	2:07.0	Kajetanowicz / Szczepaniak
SS2	Sarrazin / Roche	Lancia Ypsilon Rally2 HF Integrale	15:52.3	Sarrazin / Roche
SS3	Trentin / Ometto	Toyota GR Yaris Rally2	11:56.9	Sarrazin / Roche
SS4	Korhonen / Viinikka	Toyota GR Yaris Rally2	15:52.5	Sarrazin / Roche
SS5	Korhonen / Viinikka	Toyota GR Yaris Rally2	15:46.0	Sarrazin / Roche
SS6	Korhonen / Viinikka	Toyota GR Yaris Rally2	11:38.5	Sarrazin / Roche
SS7	Virves / Viilo	Škoda Fabia RS Rally2	15:32.1	Korhonen / Viinikka
SS8	Virves / Viilo	Škoda Fabia RS Rally2	14:31.3	Korhonen / Viinikka
SS9	Virves / Viilo	Škoda Fabia RS Rally2	16:33.3	Korhonen / Viinikka
SS10	Daprà / Guglielmetti	Škoda Fabia RS Rally2	9:41.6	Korhonen / Viinikka
SS11	Virves / Viilo	Škoda Fabia RS Rally2	14:25.3	Korhonen / Viinikka
SS12	Virves / Viilo	Škoda Fabia RS Rally2	16:08.1	Korhonen / Viinikka
SS13	Virves / Viilo	Škoda Fabia RS Rally2	9:27.9	Korhonen / Viinikka
SS14	Virves / Viilo	Škoda Fabia RS Rally2	16:47.5	Korhonen / Viinikka
SS15	Virves / Viilo	Škoda Fabia RS Rally2	5:23.1	Korhonen / Viinikka
SS16	Lindholm / Morales	Škoda Fabia RS Rally2	16:43.2	Korhonen / Viinikka
SS17	Virves / Viilo	Škoda Fabia RS Rally2	5:18.9	Korhonen / Viinikka

==== Championship standings ====
- **Bold text** indicates 2026 World Champions.

Drivers' Standings
Move	Pos.	Driver	Points
	1	**Robert Virves**	134
1	2	Roope Korhonen	94
1	3	Yohan Rossel	85
	4	Teemu Suninen	84
	5	Nikolay Gryazin	66

Co-drivers' Standings
Move	Pos.	Driver	Points
	1	**Jakko Viilo**	134
1	2	Anssi Viinikka	94
1	3	Arnaud Dunand	85
	4	Janni Hussi	84
	5	Konstantin Aleksandrov	66

Manufacturers' Standings
Move	Pos.	Driver	Points
	1	**Lancia Corse HF**	252
	2	Toksport WRT	235
	3	Toksport WRT 2	111
	4	M-Sport Ford WRT	45
	5	2C Junior Team	37

Challenger Drivers' Standings
Move	Pos.	Driver	Points
	1	**Robert Virves**	142
	2	Roope Korhonen	107
	3	Léo Rossel	81
	4	Nikolay Gryazin	76
	5	Alejandro Cachón	74

Challenger Co-drivers' Standings
Move	Pos.	Driver	Points
	1	**Jakko Viilo**	142
	2	Anssi Viinikka	109
	3	Guillaume Mercoiret	85
	4	Konstantin Aleksandrov	79
2	5	Luca Guglielmetti	71

=== WRC3 Rally3 ===
==== Classification ====
Position		No.	Driver	Co-driver	Entrant	Car	Time	Difference	Points
Event	Class	No.	Driver	Co-driver	Entrant	Car	Time	Difference	Points
25	1	72	Eric Royère	Maxime Andernack	Eric Royère	Ford Fiesta Rally3	4:17:49.2	0.0	**25**
37	2	57	Georgios Vasilakis	Allan Harryman	Georgios Vasilakis	Ford Fiesta Rally3	4:42:14.8	+24:25.6	**17**
Retired SS14		58	Alex Lorenzato	Nicolò Lazzarini	Alex Lorenzato	Ford Fiesta Rally3	Mechanical		**0**

==== Special stages ====
Stage	Winners	Car	Time	Class leaders
SD	Lorenzato / Lazzarini	Ford Fiesta Rally3	2:57.4	—N/a
SS1	Lorenzato / Lazzarini	Ford Fiesta Rally3	2:57.4	Lorenzato / Lazzarini
SS2	stage cancelled			
SS3	Lorenzato / Lazzarini	Ford Fiesta Rally3	13:13.5	Lorenzato / Lazzarini
SS4	Royère / Andernack	Ford Fiesta Rally3	18:47.8	Royère / Andernack
SS5	Lorenzato / Lazzarini	Ford Fiesta Rally3	17:43.8	Lorenzato / Lazzarini
SS6	Vasilakis / Harryman	Ford Fiesta Rally3	14:31.1	Royère / Andernack
SS7	Royère / Andernack	Ford Fiesta Rally3	19:15.6	Royère / Andernack
SS8	Lorenzato / Lazzarini	Ford Fiesta Rally3	16:33.0	Royère / Andernack
SS9	Lorenzato / Lazzarini	Ford Fiesta Rally3	18:39.5	Royère / Andernack
SS10	Lorenzato / Lazzarini	Ford Fiesta Rally3	10:45.7	Royère / Andernack
SS11	Lorenzato / Lazzarini	Ford Fiesta Rally3	16:17.3	Royère / Andernack
SS12	Lorenzato / Lazzarini	Ford Fiesta Rally3	18:16.1	Royère / Andernack
SS13	Lorenzato / Lazzarini	Ford Fiesta Rally3	10:33.9	Royère / Andernack
SS14	Royère / Andernack	Ford Fiesta Rally3	19:52.6	Royère / Andernack
SS15	Royère / Andernack	Ford Fiesta Rally3	7:07.3	Royère / Andernack
SS16	Royère / Andernack	Ford Fiesta Rally3	21:01.3	Royère / Andernack
SS17	Royère / Andernack	Ford Fiesta Rally3	7:26.8	Royère / Andernack

==== Championship standings ====
- **Bold text** indicates 2026 World Champions.

Drivers' Standings
Move	Pos.	Driver	Points
	1	**Matteo Fontana**	117
	2	Gil Membrado	99
	3	Tymoteusz Abramowski	91
2	4	Eric Royère	84
1	5	Ali Türkkan	77

Co-drivers' Standings
Move	Pos.	Driver	Points
	1	**Alessandro Arnaboldi**	117
	2	Adrián Pérez	99
	3	Jakub Wróbel	91
	4	Oytun Albayrak	56
	5	Kylian Sarmezan	55

Previous rally: 2026 Rally Chile	2026 FIA World Rally Championship	Next rally: 2027 Monte Carlo Rally (2027)
Previous rally: 2025 Rally Italia Sardegna	2026 Rally Italia Sardegna	Next rally: 2027 Rally Italia Sardegna
