= 2026 WRC2 Championship =

Rallying championship

The 2026 FIA WRC2 Championship was the fourteenth season of WRC2, a rallying championship for organised and governed by the Fédération Internationale de l'Automobile as the second-highest tier of international rallying. It was open to privateers and teams using cars complying with Group Rally2 regulations. The championship began in January 2026 with the Monte Carlo Rally and concluded in October 2026 with the Rally Italia Sardegna, and runs in support of the 2026 World Rally Championship.

== Calendar ==
The 2026 season was scheduled to be contested over fourteen rounds across Europe, Africa, South America and Asia, but it was ultimately reduced to thirteen rounds.

Round	Start date	Finish date	Rally	Rally headquarters	Surface	Stages	Distance	Ref.
1	22 January	25 January	(Monaco) Rallye Automobile Monte Carlo	Gap, Provence-Alpes-Côte d'Azur, France	Mixed (Note: The Monte Carlo Rally was run on a tarmac and snow surface.)	17	339.15 km	
2	12 February	15 February	Rally Sweden	Umeå, Västerbotten County, Sweden	Snow	18	300.66 km	
3	12 March	15 March	Safari Rally Kenya	Nairobi, Nakuru County, Kenya	Gravel	20	350.52 km	
4	9 April	12 April	Croatia Rally	Rijeka, Primorje-Gorski Kotar County, Croatia	Tarmac	20	300.28 km	
5	23 April	26 April	(Spain) Rally Islas Canarias	Las Palmas, Gran Canaria, Spain	Tarmac	18	322.04 km	
6	7 May	10 May	Rally de Portugal	Matosinhos, Porto, Portugal	Gravel	23	344.91 km	
7	28 May	31 May	Rally Japan	Toyota, Aichi, Japan	Tarmac	20	302.82 km	
8	25 June	28 June	Acropolis Rally Greece	Loutraki, Corinthia, Greece	Gravel	17	323.31 km	
9	16 July	19 July	Rally Estonia	Tartu, Estonia	Gravel	18	301.80 km	
10	30 July	2 August	Rally Finland	Jyväskylä, Central Finland, Finland	Gravel	20	316.60 km	
11	27 August	30 August	Rally del Paraguay	Encarnación, Itapúa, Paraguay	Gravel	22	358.88 km	
12	10 September	13 September	Rally Chile	Talcahuano, Biobío, Chile	Gravel	16	311.70 km	
13	1 October	4 October	(Italy) Rally Italia Sardegna	Alghero, Sardinia, Italy	Gravel	17	306.92 km	

The 2026 Rally Saudi Arabia was included on the original calendar published by WRC Promoter GmbH and was scheduled to be the fourteenth round of the championship, but was later removed from the season:

Start date	Finish date	Rally	Rally headquarters	Surface	Stages	Distance	Removal reason	Ref.
11 November	14 November	Rally Saudi Arabia	Jeddah, Mecca Province, Saudi Arabia	Gravel	16	320.34 km	2026 Iran war	

A map showing the locations of the rallies in the 2026 championship. Event headquarters were marked with black dots. Removed event was marked with a red dot.

=== Calendar changes ===
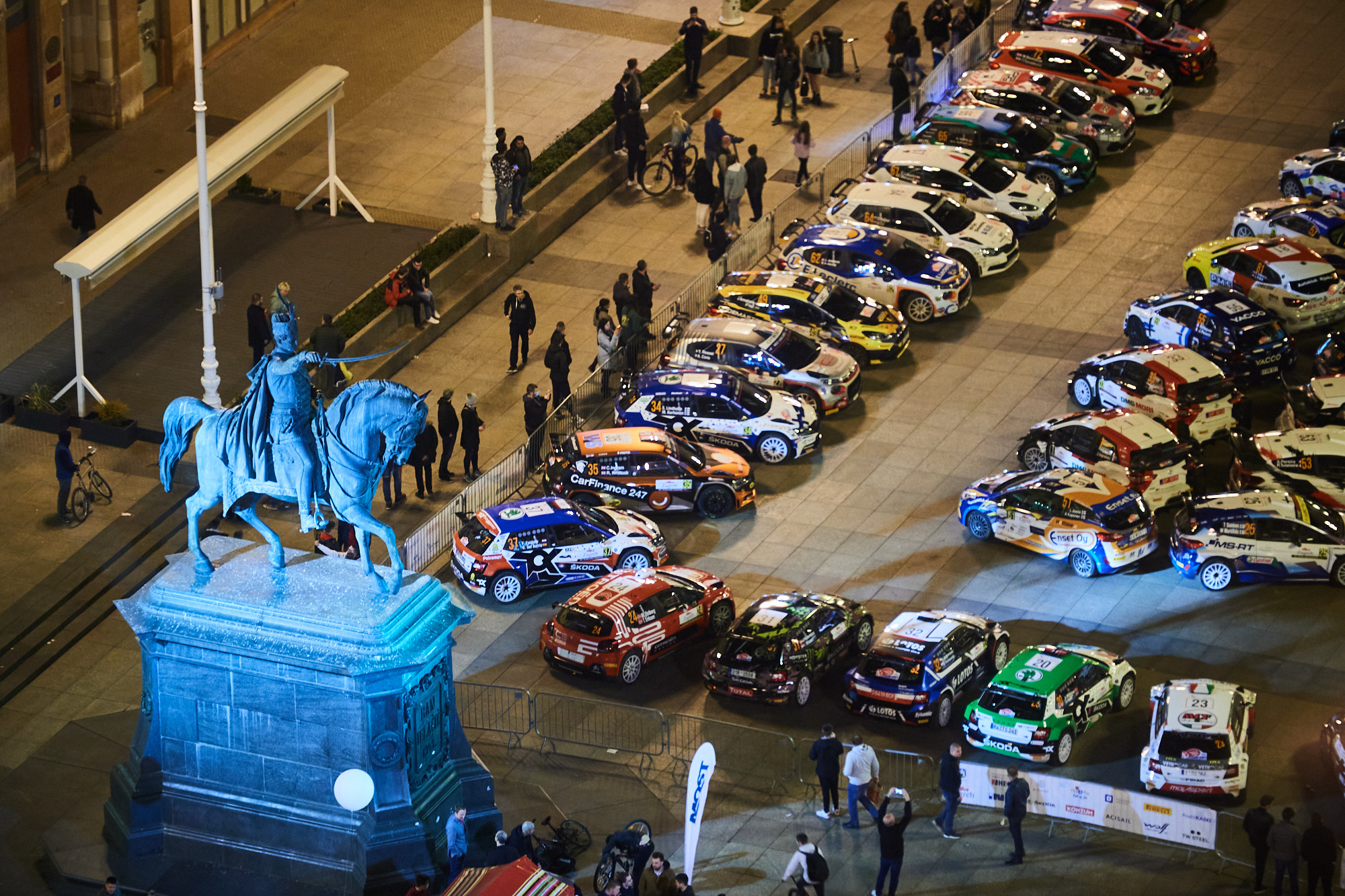
The Croatia Rally returned to the championship after being held as a European Rally Championship event in 2025.

- The Croatia Rally returned to the championship after missing the 2025 season, replacing the Central European Rally. The rally featured new headquarters in Rijeka, instead of Zagreb and a brand new set of mixed tarmac stages.
- The Italian Rally and Rally Japan swapped calendar slots, and the new Rally di Roma Capitale was confirmed to replace the Rally Italia Sardegna from 2027 onwards.
- The organisers of the Acropolis Rally announced a change of its headquarters, with Loutraki serving as the new base after five years in Lamia.
- The Rally Saudi Arabia was set to hold the season finale, but it was removed from the calendar in September due to the 2026 Iran war. An all-gravel round in Catalonia, Spain was reportedly mooted as a replacement, however this did not materialise as the deadline for its confirmation was not met.

== Entrants ==
The following teams and crews were under contract to contest the WRC2 championship in 2026. All crews competed under Rally2 regulations and use tyres provided by Hankook. Teams had to enter two crews to be eligible for Teams' Championship points.

Crews entered by or via teams
Entrant	Car	Driver		Co-Driver		Rounds
Entrant	Car	Driver Name	Category	Co-Driver Name	Category	Rounds
(France) 2C Junior Team	Citroën C3 Rally2	(France) Léo Rossel	Challenger	(France) Guillaume Mercoiret	Challenger	1, 4–5
(France) 2C Junior Team	Lancia Ypsilon Rally2 HF Integrale	(France) Léo Rossel	Challenger	(France) Guillaume Mercoiret	Challenger	8, 10, 13
(France) 2C Junior Team	Lancia Ypsilon Rally2 HF Integrale	(United States) Conner Martell	Challenger	(United States) Alex Gelsomino	Challenger	8, 10, 13
(Spain) Auto-Laca Competición	Škoda Fabia R5	(Spain) Armide Martín	Challenger	(Spain) Eduardo González	Challenger	5
(Spain) Automóvil Club Murcia	Škoda Fabia RS Rally2	(Spain) Carlos Moreno	Challenger	(Spain) Diego Fuentes	Challenger	5
(Spain) C.D. Seventen	Toyota GR Yaris Rally2	(Spain) Enrique Cruz	Challenger	(Spain) Yeray Mújica	Challenger	5
(Slovakia) Chooligan Racing Team	Hyundai i20 N Rally2	(Slovakia) Robert Kolčák	Challenger	(Czech Republic) Petr Černohorský	Challenger	2
(Spain) Escudería Costa Brava	Škoda Fabia Rally2 evo	(Spain) Antonio Forné	Challenger	(Spain) Axel Coronado	Challenger	5
(Spain) Escudería Drago Rallye	Ford Fiesta R5	(Spain) Julio Martínez	Challenger	(Spain) Pedro Viera	Challenger	5
(Spain) Escudería Hierro Sur	Citroën C3 Rally2	(Spain) Zósimo Hernández	Challenger	(Spain) Maite Gutiérrez	Challenger	5
(Turkey) GP Garage My Team	Škoda Fabia RS Rally2	(Turkey) Uğur Soylu	Challenger	(Turkey) Onur Vatansever	Challenger	2, 4
(Turkey) GP Garage My Team	Škoda Fabia RS Rally2	(Turkey) Uğur Soylu	Challenger	(Turkey) Kutay Ertuğrul	Challenger	6
(Turkey) GP Garage My Team	Škoda Fabia RS Rally2	(Turkey) Uğur Soylu	Challenger	(Turkey) Mehmet Yalçın	Challenger	8–10, 13
(Italy) Lancia Corse HF	Lancia Ypsilon Rally2 HF Integrale	(Bulgaria) Nikolay Gryazin	Challenger	(Kyrgyzstan) Konstantin Aleksandrov	Challenger	1, 4–6, 10–12
(Italy) Lancia Corse HF	Lancia Ypsilon Rally2 HF Integrale	(France) Yohan Rossel		(France) Arnaud Dunand		1, 4–6, 8, 10–12
(United Kingdom) M-Sport Ford WRT	Ford Fiesta Rally2	(Sweden) Mille Johansson	Challenger	(Sweden) Johan Grönvall	Challenger	2, 4, 6, 10
(United Kingdom) M-Sport Ford WRT	Ford Fiesta Rally2	(Estonia) Romet Jürgenson	Challenger	(Estonia) Siim Oja	Challenger	2–4, 6, 9–11
(Italy) MT Racing SRL	Škoda Fabia RS Rally2	(Italy) Giovanni Trentin	Challenger	(Italy) Pietro Elia Ometto	Challenger	2, 5–6, 9–10, 13
(Czech Republic) Orsák Rallysport	Škoda Fabia RS Rally2	(France) Tristan Charpentier	Challenger	(France) Loris Pascaud	Challenger	6
(Spain) PH.Ph	Škoda Fabia RS Rally2	(Spain) Jan Solans	Challenger	(Spain) Rodrigo Sanjuan	Challenger	5–6, 8–9, 13
(Finland) Printsport	Škoda Fabia RS Rally2	(Estonia) Patrick Enok	Challenger	(Estonia) Silver Simm	Challenger	9–10
(Finland) Printsport	Toyota GR Yaris Rally2	(France) Adrien Mosca	Challenger	(France) Julie Amblard	Challenger	5–6, 8, 10, 12
(Finland) Printsport	Toyota GR Yaris Rally2	(Poland) Michał Sołowow	Challenger	(Poland) Maciej Baran	Challenger	2
(Finland) Printsport	Toyota GR Yaris Rally2	(Japan) Yuki Yamamoto	Challenger	(Republic of Ireland) James Fulton		5, 7–11
(Finland) Printsport	Toyota GR Yaris Rally2	(Japan) Yuki Yamamoto	Challenger	(Finland) Topi Luhtinen		12
(Japan) R2RxYAHAGI Racing Team	Toyota GR Yaris Rally2	(Japan) Hiroki Arai	Challenger	(Japan) Hiroki Tachikui	Challenger	7
(Finland) Rautio Motorsport	Toyota GR Yaris Rally2	(Finland) Tuukka Kauppinen	Challenger	(Finland) Topi Luhtinen	Challenger	2
(Finland) Rautio Motorsport	Toyota GR Yaris Rally2	(Finland) Tuukka Kauppinen	Challenger	(Finland) Sebastian Virtanen	Challenger	9–10
(Finland) Rautio Motorsport	Toyota GR Yaris Rally2	(Finland) Roope Korhonen	Challenger	(Finland) Anssi Viinikka	Challenger	2, 4, 6, 8–10, 13
(Germany) Team Armin Schwarz Driving Experience	Toyota GR Yaris Rally2	(Germany) Fabio Schwarz	Challenger	(Germany) Pascal Raabe	Challenger	2
(Germany) Team Armin Schwarz Driving Experience	Toyota GR Yaris Rally2	(Germany) Fabio Schwarz	Challenger	(Spain) Axel Coronado	Challenger	13
(Germany) Toksport WRT	Škoda Fabia RS Rally2	(Finland) Emil Lindholm		(Brazil) Gabriel Morales		4–5, 7, 9–10
(Germany) Toksport WRT	Škoda Fabia RS Rally2	(Norway) Andreas Mikkelsen		(Norway) Jørn Listerud		3–4, 6, 8
(Germany) Toksport WRT	Škoda Fabia RS Rally2	(Estonia) Robert Virves	Challenger	(Estonia) Jakko Viilo	Challenger	3, 5–6, 8–10
(Germany) Toksport WRT 2	Škoda Fabia RS Rally2	(Australia) Taylor Gill	Challenger	(Australia) Daniel Brkic	Challenger	11–12
(Germany) Toksport WRT 2	Škoda Fabia RS Rally2	(Finland) Emil Lindholm		(Brazil) Gabriel Morales		13
(Germany) Toksport WRT 2	Škoda Fabia RS Rally2	(Norway) Andreas Mikkelsen		(Norway) Jørn Listerud		13
(Germany) Toksport WRT 2	Škoda Fabia RS Rally2	(Estonia) Robert Virves	Challenger	(Estonia) Jakko Viilo	Challenger	11–13
(Turkey) TOSFED	Ford Fiesta Rally2	(Turkey) Ali Türkkan	Challenger	(Turkey) Oytun Albayrak	Challenger	8
(Spain) Toyota España	Toyota GR Yaris Rally2	(Spain) Alejandro Cachón	Challenger	(Spain) Borja Rozada		4–8, 11–12
(Japan) Toyota Gazoo Racing WRT NG	Toyota GR Yaris Rally2	(Japan) Shotaro Goto	Challenger	(Finland) Jussi Lindberg	Challenger	9–10
(Japan) Toyota Gazoo Racing WRT NG	Toyota GR Yaris Rally2	(Japan) Takumi Matsushita	Challenger	(Finland) Pekka Kelander	Challenger	9–10
(Japan) Toyota Gazoo Racing WRT NG	Toyota GR Yaris Rally2	(Estonia) Jaspar Vaher	Challenger	(Estonia) Rait Jansen	Challenger	9–10
(Austria) ZM Racing Team	Ford Fiesta Rally2	(Austria) Kevin Raith	Challenger	(Austria) Claudia Maier	Challenger	13

Private entries
Car	Driver		Co-driver		Rounds
Car	Driver name	Category	Co-driver name	Category	Rounds
Ford Fiesta Rally2	(Poland) Tymoteusz Abramowski	Challenger	(Poland) Jakub Wróbel	Challenger	13
Toyota GR Yaris Rally2	(United Kingdom) Philip Allen	Challenger	(United Kingdom) Craig Drew	Challenger	5
Škoda Fabia R5	(Kenya) Issa Amwari	Challenger	(Kenya) Dennis Mwenda	Challenger	3
Škoda Fabia RS Rally2	(Portugal) Armindo Araújo	Challenger	(Portugal) Luís Ramalho	Challenger	6
Hyundai i20 N Rally2	(Greece) Lambros Athanassoulas	Challenger	(Greece) Konstantinos Soukoulis	Challenger	8
Škoda Fabia RS Rally2	(Paraguay) Sebastián Barchini	Challenger	(Argentina) Rubén García	Challenger	11
Toyota GR Yaris Rally2	(Australia) Harry Bates	Challenger	(United Kingdom) Keaton Williams	Challenger	6
Škoda Fabia RS Rally2	(Brazil) Cristian Baumgart	Challenger	(Brazil) Luis Felipe Eckel	Challenger	2
Toyota GR Yaris Rally2	(Paraguay) Augusto Bestard	Challenger	(Argentina) José Díaz	Challenger	11
Ford Fiesta Rally2	(Republic of Ireland) Eamonn Boland	Challenger	(Republic of Ireland) Michael Joseph Morrissey	Challenger	1
Toyota GR Yaris Rally2	(Bolivia) Marco Bulacia	Challenger	(Spain) José Murado	Challenger	11
Toyota GR Yaris Rally2	(Switzerland) Olivier Burri	Challenger	(Switzerland) Stéphane Fellay	Challenger	1
Škoda Fabia RS Rally2	(France) Eric Camilli		(France) Thibault de la Haye		1, 4–6
Citroën C3 Rally2	(Romania) Eugen Cărăgui	Challenger	(Romania) Robert Fus	Challenger	6, 13
Škoda Fabia RS Rally2	(France) Mattéo Chatillon	Challenger	(France) Maxence Cornuau	Challenger	1–2, 6, 8, 10
Škoda Fabia RS Rally2	(Italy) Maurizio Chiarani	Challenger	(Italy) Flavio Zanella	Challenger	5
Škoda Fabia RS Rally2	(Poland) Daniel Chwist	Challenger	(Poland) Kamil Heller	Challenger	3
Škoda Fabia R5	(Italy) Carlo Covi	Challenger	(Italy) Michela Lorigiola	Challenger	1
Škoda Fabia RS Rally2	(Italy) Carlo Covi	Challenger	(Italy) Denis Piceno	Challenger	13
Škoda Fabia RS Rally2	(Italy) Luciano Cobbe	Challenger	(Italy) Davide Bianchi	Challenger	1
Škoda Fabia RS Rally2	(Italy) Luciano Cobbe	Challenger	(Italy) Roberto Mometti	Challenger	2
Škoda Fabia RS Rally2	(Italy) Roberto Daprà	Challenger	(Italy) Luca Guglielmetti	Challenger	1, 4–6, 8, 13
Toyota GR Yaris Rally2	(France) Eliott Delecour	Challenger	(France) Sabrina De Castelli	Challenger	1–2
Škoda Fabia RS Rally2	(France) Eliott Delecour	Challenger	(France) Romain Roche	Challenger	6
Škoda Fabia RS Rally2	(France) Eliott Delecour	Challenger	(France) Alexis Maillefert	Challenger	10
Škoda Fabia RS Rally2	(Italy) Giuseppe Dettori	Challenger	(Italy) Carlo Pisano	Challenger	13
Citroën C3 Rally2	(Romania) Cristian Dolofan	Challenger	(Romania) Traian Pavel	Challenger	8
Toyota GR Yaris Rally2	(Paraguay) Diego Domínguez Jr.	Challenger	(Spain) Rogelio Peñate	Challenger	3, 5, 7–8, 11–12
Škoda Fabia R5	(Paraguay) Matías Domínguez	Challenger	(Paraguay) Marco Méndez	Challenger	11
Škoda Fabia RS Rally2	(Poland) Aron Domżała	Challenger	(Poland) Michał Kuśnierz	Challenger	13
Hyundai i20 R5	(Greece) Dimitrios Drivakos	Challenger	(Greece) Aikaterini Bante	Challenger	1
Škoda Fabia R5	(Portugal) Ricardo Filipe	Challenger	(Portugal) Filipe Carvalho	Challenger	6
Toyota GR Yaris Rally2	(Italy) Matteo Fontana	Challenger	(Italy) Alessandro Arnaboldi	Challenger	13
Škoda Fabia RS Rally2	(Italy) Fabio Frisiero	Challenger	(Italy) Danilo Fappani	Challenger	13
Škoda Fabia RS Rally2	(Japan) Osamu Fukunaga	Challenger	(Japan) Misako Saida	Challenger	7
Toyota GR Yaris Rally2	(Paraguay) Alejandro Galanti	Challenger	(Argentina) Marcelo Toyotoshi	Challenger	8, 11
Škoda Fabia RS Rally2	(Italy) Giovanni Galleni	Challenger	(Italy) Alessandro Scartabelli	Challenger	13
Toyota GR Yaris Rally2	(Paraguay) Miguel Ángel García	Challenger	(Paraguay) Hernan Vargas	Challenger	11
Toyota GR Yaris Rally2	(Australia) Taylor Gill	Challenger	(Australia) Daniel Brkic	Challenger	2, 4, 10
Škoda Fabia Rally2 evo	(Paraguay) Eugen Gotze	Challenger	(Paraguay) Juan Bilbao	Challenger	11
Škoda Fabia RS Rally2	(Sweden) Adam Grahn	Challenger	(Sweden) Christoffer Bäck	Challenger	2
Škoda Fabia RS Rally2	(Mexico) Miguel Granados	Challenger	(Spain) Marc Martí	Challenger	2, 5–6, 8, 11–13
Toyota GR Yaris Rally2	(United Kingdom) Gus Greensmith		(Sweden) Jonas Andersson		3, 6, 8, 11–13
Lancia Ypsilon Rally2 HF Integrale	(Bulgaria) Nikolay Gryazin	Challenger	(Kyrgyzstan) Konstantin Aleksandrov	Challenger	7
Škoda Fabia RS Rally2	(Finland) Mikko Heikkilä	Challenger	(Finland) Kristian Temonen	Challenger	2, 9–10
Toyota GR Yaris Rally2	(Chile) Alberto Heller	Challenger	(Argentina) Luis Allende	Challenger	12
Toyota GR Yaris Rally2	(Chile) Pedro Heller	Challenger	(Argentina) Pablo Olmos	Challenger	12
Škoda Fabia RS Rally2	(Norway) Jens Hvaal	Challenger	(Norway) Stig Rune Skjærmoen	Challenger	2
Citroën C3 Rally2	(Japan) Satoshi Imai	Challenger	(Japan) Yuki Ogawa	Challenger	7
Toyota GR Yaris Rally2	(United Kingdom) Chris Ingram	Challenger	(United States) Alex Kihurani	Challenger	1
Škoda Fabia RS Rally2	(Sweden) Mille Johansson	Challenger	(Sweden) Johan Grönvall	Challenger	5, 8–9
Škoda Fabia RS Rally2	(Finland) Lauri Joona	Challenger	(Finland) Antti Linnaketo	Challenger	2, 9–10
Škoda Fabia RS Rally2	(Spain) Ferrán Jubany	Challenger	(Spain) Alejandro López	Challenger	6
Toyota GR Yaris Rally2	(Finland) Tommi Jylhä	Challenger	(Finland) Kimmo Nevanpää	Challenger	2
Toyota GR Yaris Rally2	(Poland) Kajetan Kajetanowicz	Challenger	(Poland) Maciej Szczepaniak		4, 13
Ford Fiesta Rally2	(Greece) Epameinondas Karanikolas	Challenger	(Greece) Georgios Kakavas	Challenger	8
Toyota GR Yaris Rally2	(Japan) Norihiko Katsuta	Challenger	(Japan) Takahiro Yasui	Challenger	7
Toyota GR Yaris Rally2	(Estonia) Egon Kaur	Challenger	(Estonia) Ermo Veltson	Challenger	9
Toyota GR Yaris Rally2	(Austria) Johannes Keferböck	Challenger	(Austria) Ilka Minor		1, 4–5, 8–10, 13
Škoda Fabia RS Rally2	(Czech Republic) Filip Kohn	Challenger	(United Kingdom) Ross Whittock	Challenger	1
Škoda Fabia RS Rally2	(Poland) Jarosław Kołtun	Challenger	(Poland) Ireneusz Pleskot	Challenger	1–2
Škoda Fabia RS Rally2	(Finland) Benjamin Korhola	Challenger	(Finland) Kristian Temonen	Challenger	13
Toyota GR Yaris Rally2	(Paraguay) Andrea Lafarja	Challenger	(Paraguay) Germán Maune	Challenger	3, 5, 8, 11–12
Toyota GR Yaris Rally2	(Paraguay) Andrea Lafarja	Challenger	(Spain) Andrés Blanco	Challenger	7
Škoda Fabia RS Rally2	(Individual Neutral Athletes) Alexey Lukyanuk	Challenger	(Individual Neutral Athletes) Yuriy Kulikov	Challenger	5
Citroën C3 Rally2	(United States) Filippo Marchino	Challenger	(Italy) Pietro Elia Ometto	Challenger	1
Citroën C3 Rally2	(United States) Filippo Marchino	Challenger	(United States) Alex Kihurani	Challenger	5
Toyota GR Yaris Rally2	(Czech Republic) Filip Mareš	Challenger	(Czech Republic) Radovan Bucha	Challenger	1
Hyundai i20 N Rally2	(Peru) Jorge Martínez	Challenger	(Argentina) Marcelo Brizio	Challenger	6, 9
Škoda Fabia RS Rally2	(Chile) Jorge Martínez Fontena	Challenger	(Argentina) Rubén García	Challenger	12
Škoda Fabia Rally2 evo	(Portugal) Diogo Marujo	Challenger	(Portugal) Jorge Carvalho	Challenger	6
Škoda Fabia RS Rally2	(Mexico) Alejandro Mauro	Challenger	(Spain) Ariday Bonilla	Challenger	2, 5–6, 8
Škoda Fabia RS Rally2	(Mexico) Alejandro Mauro	Challenger	(Spain) Carla Salvat	Challenger	13
Škoda Fabia RS Rally2	(Portugal) Pedro Meireles	Challenger	(Portugal) Mário Castro	Challenger	6
Škoda Fabia RS Rally2	(Switzerland) Stefano Mella	Challenger	(Switzerland) Veronica Tramontin	Challenger	1
Škoda Fabia RS Rally2	(Belgium) Amaury Molle	Challenger	(France) Alex Dubois	Challenger	1
Škoda Fabia RS Rally2	(Portugal) Paulo Neto	Challenger	(Portugal) Carlos Magalhães	Challenger	6
Toyota GR Yaris Rally2	(Estonia) Joosep Ralf Nõgene	Challenger	(Estonia) Aleks Lesk	Challenger	9–10
Toyota GR Yaris Rally2	(Japan) Fumio Nutahara	Challenger	(Japan) Shungo Azuma	Challenger	7
Škoda Fabia RS Rally2	(Paraguay) Miguel Ortega	Challenger	(Argentina) Diego Cagnotti	Challenger	11
Toyota GR Yaris Rally2	(Paraguay) Franco Pappalardo	Challenger	(Argentina) Juan Pablo Carrera	Challenger	11
Škoda Fabia R5	(Kenya) Karan Patel	Challenger	(Kenya) Tauseef Khan	Challenger	3
Volkswagen Polo GTI R5	(Paraguay) César Pedotti	Challenger	(Paraguay) Nicolás Elizaur	Challenger	11
Hyundai i20 N Rally2	(France) Arthur Pelamourgues	Challenger	(France) Bastien Pouget	Challenger	1, 4–5, 9–10
Citroën C3 Rally2	(France) Julien Piguet	Challenger	(Lebanon) Marc Haddad	Challenger	1
Škoda Fabia RS Rally2	(Italy) Giuseppe Pozzo	Challenger	(Italy) Pietro Paolo Cottu	Challenger	13
Škoda Fabia RS Rally2	(Croatia) Viliam Prodan	Challenger	(Croatia) Marko Stiperski	Challenger	4
Škoda Fabia RS Rally2	(Czech Republic) Martin Prokop	Challenger	(Czech Republic) Michal Ernst	Challenger	8, 10
Škoda Fabia RS Rally2	(Sweden) Isak Reiersen	Challenger	(Sweden) Stefan Gustavsson	Challenger	2
Toyota GR Yaris Rally2	(Portugal) Rúben Rodriguez	Challenger	(Portugal) Rui Raimundo	Challenger	6
Škoda Fabia RS Rally2	(Italy) Simone Romagna	Challenger	(Italy) Dino Lamonato	Challenger	13
Citroën C3 Rally2	(Chile) Emilio Rosselot	Challenger	(Chile) Matías Leiva	Challenger	12
Citroën C3 Rally2	(Chile) Tadeo Rosselot	Challenger	(Chile) Matías Améstica	Challenger	12
Škoda Fabia RS Rally2	(Greece) Panagiotis Roustemis	Challenger	(Greece) Christos Bakloris	Challenger	8
Toyota GR Yaris Rally2	(Paraguay) Gustavo Saba	Challenger	(Argentina) Pablo Olmos	Challenger	11
Škoda Fabia RS Rally2	(Portugal) Diogo Salvi	Challenger	(Portugal) Gonçalo Cunha	Challenger	6
Citroën C3 Rally2	(France) Pablo Sarrazin	Challenger	(France) Yannick Roche	Challenger	1, 4–6
Lancia Ypsilon Rally2 HF Integrale	(France) Pablo Sarrazin	Challenger	(France) Yannick Roche	Challenger	8, 13
Škoda Fabia R5	(Portugal) Tiago Silva	Challenger	(Portugal) Jorge Henriques	Challenger	6
Škoda Fabia RS Rally2	(Italy) Sebastiano Serpelloni	Challenger	(Italy) Nicola Petrin	Challenger	13
Škoda Fabia Rally2 evo	(Kenya) Samman Singh Vohra	Challenger	(United Kingdom) Drew Sturrock	Challenger	3
Toyota GR Yaris Rally2	(Finland) Teemu Suninen		(Finland) Janni Hussi		2, 6, 9–10, 13
Ford Fiesta Rally2	(Italy) Francesco Tali	Challenger	(Italy) Gianina Libera	Challenger	13
Toyota GR Yaris Rally2	(Netherlands) Bernhard ten Brinke	Challenger	(United Kingdom) Tom Woodburn	Challenger	2, 4, 6, 8–9
Ford Fiesta R5	(Kenya) Carl Tundo	Challenger	(Kenya) Tim Jessop	Challenger	3
Toyota GR Yaris Rally2	(Finland) Marko Viitanen	Challenger	(Finland) Tapio Suominen	Challenger	2
Toyota GR Yaris Rally2	(Spain) Alexander Villanueva	Challenger	(Spain) Axel Coronado	Challenger	2
Škoda Fabia R5	(Kenya) Aakif Virani	Challenger	(Kenya) Zahir Shah	Challenger	3
Hyundai i20 N Rally2	(Netherlands) Henk Vossen	Challenger	(Netherlands) Saskia Bleijenberg	Challenger	1
Hyundai i20 N Rally2	(Netherlands) Henk Vossen	Challenger	(Netherlands) Radboud van Hoek	Challenger	4
Škoda Fabia RS Rally2	(Kenya) Jeremiah Wahome	Challenger	(Kenya) Victor Okundi	Challenger	3
Škoda Fabia RS Rally2	(Belgium) John Wartique	Challenger	(Belgium) Maxime Andernack	Challenger	1–2
Škoda Fabia RS Rally2	(Paraguay) Miguel Zaldivar Jr.	Challenger	(Argentina) Luis Allende	Challenger	11
Škoda Fabia RS Rally2	(Paraguay) Miguel Zaldivar Sr.	Challenger	(Paraguay) Juan Sánchez	Challenger	11
Škoda Fabia RS Rally2	(Paraguay) Fabrizio Zaldivar	Challenger	(Italy) Marcelo Der Ohannesian	Challenger	3, 6, 9–13

== Results and standings ==
=== Season summary ===
Round	Event	Winning driver	Winning co-driver	Winning entrant	Winning time	Report	Ref.
1	(Monaco) Rallye Automobile Monte Carlo	(France) Léo Rossel	(France) Guillaume Mercoiret	(France) 2C Junior Team	4:37:57.4	Report	
2	Rally Sweden	(Finland) Roope Korhonen	(Finland) Anssi Viinikka	(Finland) Rautio Motorsport	2:46:29.3	Report	
3	Safari Rally Kenya	(Estonia) Robert Virves	(Estonia) Jakko Viilo	(Germany) Toksport WRT	3:27:44.3	Report	
4	Croatia Rally	(France) Yohan Rossel	(France) Arnaud Dunand	(Italy) Lancia Corse HF	2:56:35.7	Report	
5	(Spain) Rally Islas Canarias	(France) Yohan Rossel	(France) Arnaud Dunand	(Italy) Lancia Corse HF	2:50:43.2	Report	
6	Rally de Portugal	(Finland) Teemu Suninen	(Finland) Janni Hussi	(Finland) Teemu Suninen	4:04:15.5	Report	
7	Rally Japan	(Bulgaria) Nikolay Gryazin	(Kyrgyzstan) Konstantin Aleksandrov	(Bulgaria) Nikolay Gryazin	3:26:29.3	Report	
8	Acropolis Rally Greece	(Estonia) Robert Virves	(Estonia) Jakko Viilo	(Germany) Toksport WRT	3:46:30.8	Report	
9	Rally Estonia	(Estonia) Robert Virves	(Estonia) Jakko Viilo	(Germany) Toksport WRT	2:39:49.6	Report	
10	Rally Finland	(Estonia) Robert Virves	(Estonia) Jakko Viilo	(Germany) Toksport WRT	2:36:44.9	Report	
11	Rally del Paraguay	(Paraguay) Diego Domínguez Jr.	(Spain) Rogelio Peñate	(Paraguay) Diego Domínguez Jr.	3:21:09.0	Report	
12	Rally Chile	(France) Yohan Rossel	(France) Arnaud Dunand	(Italy) Lancia Corse HF	3:06:39.2	Report	
13	(Italy) Rally Italia Sardegna	(Finland) Roope Korhonen	(Finland) Anssi Viinikka	(Finland) Rautio Motorsport	3:37:07.4	Report	
–	Rally Saudi Arabia	Rally removed (due to the 2026 Iran war)				Report	

=== Scoring system ===
A team has to enter two cars to score points in an event. Drivers and teams must nominate a scoring rally when they enter the event. Originally, the best six scores from seven nominated rallies counted towards the final classification, but in response to the removal of Rally Saudi Arabia from the calendar, the FIA reduced the eligible score requirement to the best five of seven rounds. Registered drivers are able to enter additional rallies with Priority 2 status without scoring points.

Position	1st	2nd	3rd	4th	5th	6th	7th	8th	9th	10th
Points	25	17	15	12	10	8	6	4	2	1

=== FIA WRC2 Championship for Drivers ===
Pos.	Driver	MON (Monaco)	SWE (Sweden)	KEN (Kenya)	CRO (Croatia)	ESP (Spain)	POR (Portugal)	JPN (Japan)	GRE (Greece)	EST (Estonia)	FIN (Finland)	PAR (Paraguay)	CHL (Chile)	ITA (Italy)	Points
1	(Estonia) Robert Virves			1		NC	NC		1	1	1	18	2	(2)	117
2	(Finland) Roope Korhonen		1		(5)		2		4	3	18			1	94
3	(France) Yohan Rossel	9			1	1	18		Ret		NC	6	1		85
4	(Finland) Teemu Suninen		2				1			2	2			6	84
5	(Bulgaria) Nikolay Gryazin	6			3	6	NC	1			NC	5	Ret		66
6	(United Kingdom) Gus Greensmith			2			10		19	NC	NC	2	3	3	65
7	(France) Léo Rossel	1			2	5			6		8			Ret	64
8	(Spain) Alejandro Cachón		NC		4	2	Ret	2	3			Ret	Ret		61
9	(Paraguay) Diego Domínguez Jr.			5		12		Ret	5			1	6		53
10	(Italy) Roberto Daprà	2			6	4	13		17					5	47
11	(Norway) Andreas Mikkelsen			4	11		3		2					WD	44
12	(Australia) Taylor Gill		4		9						10	4	4		39
13	(Finland) Lauri Joona		3							7	3				36
14	(Finland) Emil Lindholm				7	8		4		4	Ret			13	34
15	(France) Eric Camilli	4			Ret	3	7								33
16	(Paraguay) Fabrizio Zaldivar			3		NC	5			13	Ret	9	Ret	Ret	27
17	(Sweden) Mille Johansson		Ret		17	10	6		Ret	5	6				27
18	(Spain) Jan Solans					7	4		8	20				Ret	22
19	(Japan) Yuki Yamamoto	NC			NC	15	NC	3	10	16	19	14	Ret		16
20	(Poland) Kajetan Kajetanowicz				8									4	16
21	(France) Arthur Pelamourgues	3			Ret	13				15	Ret				15
22	(Paraguay) Alejandro Galanti								15			3			15
23	(Estonia) Romet Jürgenson	NC	14	Ret	10	NC	11	NC	NC	8	5	Ret	NC		15
24	(Estonia) Jaspar Vaher									Ret	4				12
25	(Italy) Giovanni Trentin		8			14	16			12	7			10	11
26	(Chile) Jorge Martínez Fontena						Ret			WD			5		10
27	(United Kingdom) Chris Ingram	5													10
28	(Sweden) Isak Reiersen		5												10
29	(Japan) Hiroki Arai							5							10
30	(Estonia) Patrick Enok									6	20				8
31	(Poland) Michał Sołowow		6												8
32	(Poland) Daniel Chwist			6											8
33	(Japan) Norihiko Katsuta							6							8
34	(France) Mattéo Chatillon	11	10				8		9		11				7
35	(France) Pablo Sarrazin	Ret			Ret	11	17		7					18	6
36	(Mexico) Alejandro Mauro		21			Ret	WD		11					7	6
37	(Poland) Jarosław Kołtun	7	20												6
38	(Finland) Tommi Jylhä		7												6
39	(Kenya) Karan Patel			7											6
40	(Japan) Fumio Nutahara							7							6
41	(Paraguay) Miguel Zaldivar Jr.											7			6
42	(Chile) Alberto Heller												7		6
43	(Paraguay) Andrea Lafarja			10		23		8	18			13	WD		5
44	(Czech Republic) Filip Kohn	8													4
45	(Kenya) Aakif Virani			8											4
46	(Paraguay) Augusto Bestard											8			4
47	(Chile) Emilio Rosselot												8		4
48	(Austria) Kevin Raith													8	4
49	(Japan) Takumi Matsushita									10	9				3
50	(Netherlands) Bernhard ten Brinke		15		15		9			17					2
51	(Estonia) Joosep Ralf Nõgene									9	Ret				2
52	(Finland) Marko Viitanen		9												2
53	(Kenya) Samman Singh Vohra			9											2
54	(Spain) Enrique Cruz					9									2
55	(Japan) Satoshi Imai							9							2
56	(Chile) Pedro Heller												9		2
57	(Italy) Simone Romagna													9	2
58	(Belgium) John Wartique	10	13												1
59	(France) Adrien Mosca					24	21		20		15		10		1
60	(Japan) Osamu Fukunaga							10							1
61	(Paraguay) Miguel Zaldivar Sr.											10			1
Pos.	Driver	MON (Monaco)	SWE (Sweden)	KEN (Kenya)	CRO (Croatia)	ESP (Spain)	POR (Portugal)	JPN (Japan)	GRE (Greece)	EST (Estonia)	FIN (Finland)	PAR (Paraguay)	CHL (Chile)	ITA (Italy)	Points

Key
Colour	Result
Gold	Winner
Silver	2nd place
Bronze	3rd place
Green	Points finish
Blue	Non-points finish
Blue	Non-classified finish (NC)
Purple	Did not finish (Ret)
Black	Excluded (EX)
Black	Disqualified (DSQ)
White	Did not start (DNS)
White	Cancelled (C)
Blank	Withdrew entry from the event (WD)

=== FIA WRC2 Championship for Co-Drivers ===
Pos.	Co-driver	MON (Monaco)	SWE (Sweden)	KEN (Kenya)	CRO (Croatia)	ESP (Spain)	POR (Portugal)	JPN (Japan)	GRE (Greece)	EST (Estonia)	FIN (Finland)	PAR (Paraguay)	CHL (Chile)	ITA (Italy)	Points
1	(Estonia) Jakko Viilo			1		NC	NC		1	1	1	18	2	2	134
2	(Finland) Anssi Viinikka		1		5		2		4	3	18			1	94
3	(France) Arnaud Dunand	9			1	1	18		Ret			6	1		85
4	(Finland) Janni Hussi		2				1			2	2			6	84
5	(Kyrgyzstan) Konstantin Aleksandrov	6			3	6	NC	1				5	Ret		66
6	(Sweden) Jonas Andersson			2			10		19	NC	Ret	2	3	3	65
7	(France) Guillaume Mercoiret	1			2	5			6		8			Ret	64
8	(Spain) Borja Rozada		NC		4	2	Ret	2	3			Ret	Ret		61
9	(Spain) Rogelio Peñate			5		12		Ret	5			1	6		53
10	(Italy) Luca Guglielmetti	2			6	4	13		17					5	47
11	(Norway) Jørn Listerud			4	11		3		2					WD	44
12	(Australia) Daniel Brkic		4		9						10	4	4		39
13	(Finland) Antti Linnaketo		3							7	3				36
14	(Brazil) Gabriel Morales				7	8		4		4	Ret			13	34
15	(France) Thibault de la Haye	4			Ret	3	7								33
16	(Italy) Marcelo Der Ohannesian			3		NC	5			13	Ret	9	Ret	Ret	27
17	(Sweden) Johan Grönvall		Ret		17	10	6		Ret	5	6				27
18	(Spain) Rodrigo Sanjuan de Eusebio					7	4		8	20				Ret	22
19	(Republic of Ireland) James Fulton	NC			NC	15	NC	3	10	16	19	14	WD		16
20	(Poland) Maciej Szczepaniak				8									4	16
21	(France) Bastien Pouget	3			Ret	13				15	Ret				15
22	(Argentina) Marcelo Toyotoshi								15			3			15
23	(Estonia) Siim Oja	NC	14	Ret	10	NC	11	NC	NC	8	5	Ret	NC		15
24	(Estonia) Rait Jansen									Ret	4				12
25	(Argentina) Luis Allende											7	7		12
26	(Italy) Pietro Elia Ometto	16	8			14	16			12	7			10	11
27	(Argentina) Rubén García											15	5		10
28	(United States) Alexander Kihurani	5				20									10
29	(Sweden) Stefan Gustavsson		5												10
30	(Japan) Hiroki Tachikui							5							10
31	(Estonia) Silver Simm									6	20				8
32	(Poland) Maciej Baran		6												8
33	(Poland) Kamil Heller			6											8
34	(Japan) Takahiro Yasui							6							8
35	(France) Maxence Cornuau	11	10				8		9		11				7
36	(France) Yannick Roche	Ret			Ret	11	17		7					18	6
37	(Poland) Ireneusz Pleskot	7	20												6
38	(Finland) Kimmo Nevanpää		7												6
39	(Kenya) Tauseef Khan			7											6
40	(Japan) Shungo Azuma							7							6
41	(Spain) Carla Salvat													7	6
42	(United Kingdom) Ross Whittock	8													4
43	(Kenya) Zahir Shah			8											4
44	(Spain) Andrés Blanco							8							4
45	(Argentina) José Díaz											8			4
46	(Chile) Matias Leiva												8		4
47	(Austria) Claudia Maier													8	4
48	(Finland) Pekka Kelander									10	9				3
49	(United Kingdom) Tom Woodburn		15		15		9		Ret	17					2
50	(Estonia) Aleks Lesk									9	Ret				2
51	(Argentina) Pablo Olmos											Ret	9		2
52	(Finland) Tapio Suominen		9												2
53	(United Kingdom) Drew Sturrock			9											2
54	(Spain) Yeray Mújica Eugenio					9									2
55	(Japan) Yuki Ogawa							9							2
56	(Italy) Dino Lamonato													9	2
57	(Paraguay) Germán Maune			10					18			13			1
58	(Belgium) Maxime Andernack	10	13												1
59	(France) Julie Amblard					24	21		20		15		10		1
60	(Japan) Misako Saida							10							1
61	(Paraguay) Juan José Sánchez											10			1
Pos.	Co-driver	MON (Monaco)	SWE (Sweden)	KEN (Kenya)	CRO (Croatia)	ESP (Spain)	POR (Portugal)	JPN (Japan)	GRE (Greece)	EST (Estonia)	FIN (Finland)	PAR (Paraguay)	CHL (Chile)	ITA (Italy)	Points

Key
Colour	Result
Gold	Winner
Silver	2nd place
Bronze	3rd place
Green	Points finish
Blue	Non-points finish
Blue	Non-classified finish (NC)
Purple	Did not finish (Ret)
Black	Excluded (EX)
Black	Disqualified (DSQ)
White	Did not start (DNS)
White	Cancelled (C)
Blank	Withdrew entry from the event (WD)

=== FIA WRC2 Championship for Teams ===
Pos.	Team	MON (Monaco)	SWE (Sweden)	KEN (Kenya)	CRO (Croatia)	ESP (Spain)	POR (Portugal)	JPN (Japan)	GRE (Greece)	EST (Estonia)	FIN (Finland)	PAR (Paraguay)	CHL (Chile)	ITA (Italy)	Points
1	(Italy) Lancia Corse HF	1			1	1	1				2	2	1		252
1	(Italy) Lancia Corse HF	2			2	2	4				3	3	Ret		252
2	(Germany) Toksport WRT			1	3	3	2		1	1	1				235
2	(Germany) Toksport WRT			2	5	4	3		2	2	Ret				235
3	(Germany) Toksport WRT 2											1	2	1	111
3	(Germany) Toksport WRT 2											4	3	2	111
4	(United Kingdom) M-Sport Ford WRT		1		4										45
4	(United Kingdom) M-Sport Ford WRT		Ret		6										45
5	(France) 2C Junior Team								3		4			Ret	37
5	(France) 2C Junior Team								Ret		5			Ret	37
Pos.	Team	MON (Monaco)	SWE (Sweden)	KEN (Kenya)	CRO (Croatia)	ESP (Spain)	POR (Portugal)	JPN (Japan)	GRE (Greece)	EST (Estonia)	FIN (Finland)	PAR (Paraguay)	CHL (Chile)	ITA (Italy)	Points

Key
Colour	Result
Gold	Winner
Silver	2nd place
Bronze	3rd place
Green	Points finish
Blue	Non-points finish
Blue	Non-classified finish (NC)
Purple	Did not finish (Ret)
Black	Excluded (EX)
Black	Disqualified (DSQ)
White	Did not start (DNS)
White	Cancelled (C)
Blank	Withdrew entry from the event (WD)

=== FIA WRC2 Challenger Championship for Drivers ===
Pos.	Driver	MON (Monaco)	SWE (Sweden)	KEN (Kenya)	CRO (Croatia)	ESP (Spain)	POR (Portugal)	JPN (Japan)	GRE (Greece)	EST (Estonia)	FIN (Finland)	PAR (Paraguay)	CHL (Chile)	ITA (Italy)	Points
1	(Estonia) Robert Virves			1		NC	NC		1	1	1	16	1	(2)	125
2	(Finland) Roope Korhonen		1		(4)		1		3	2	17			1	107
3	(France) Léo Rossel	1			1	3			5		7			Ret	81
4	(Bulgaria) Nikolay Gryazin	5			2	4	NC	1				4	Ret		76
5	(Spain) Alejandro Cachón		NC		3	1	Ret	2	2			Ret	Ret		74
6	(Paraguay) Diego Domínguez Jr.			3		9		Ret	4			1	4		66
7	(Italy) Roberto Daprà	2			5	2	9		16					4	58
8	(Australia) Taylor Gill		3		7						9	3	2		55
9	(Finland) Lauri Joona		2							5	2				44
10	(Sweden) Mille Johansson		Ret		14	7	4		Ret	3	5				43
11	(Paraguay) Fabrizio Zaldivar			2		NC	3			11	Ret	7	Ret	Ret	38
12	(Spain) Jan Solans					5	2		7	18				Ret	33
13	(Estonia) Romet Jürgenson	NC	13	Ret	8	NC	7	NC		6	4	Ret			30
14	(Poland) Kajetan Kajetanowicz				6									3	23
15	(France) Mattéo Chatillon	9	9				5		8		10				19
16	(Italy) Giovanni Trentin		7			11	12			10	6			8	19
17	(Paraguay) Alejandro Galanti								14			2			17
18	(Japan) Yuki Yamamoto	NC			NC	12	NC	3	9	14	18	12	Ret		17
19	(France) Arthur Pelamourges	3			Ret	10				13	Ret				16
20	(Peru) Jorge Martínez Fontena						Ret			WD			3		15
21	(Estonia) Jaspar Vaher									Ret	3				15
22	(Estonia) Patrick Enok									4	19				12
23	(United Kingdom) Chris Ingram	4													12
24	(Sweden) Isak Reiersen		4												12
25	(Poland) Daniel Chwist			4											12
26	(Japan) Hiroki Arai							4							12
27	(France) Pablo Sarrazin	Ret			Ret	8	13		6					15	12
28	(Mexico) Alejandro Mauro		21			Ret	WD		10					5	11
29	(Poland) Michał Sołowow		5												10
30	(Kenya) Karan Patel			5											10
31	(Japan) Norihiko Katsuta							5							10
32	(Paraguay) Miguel Zaldivar Jr.											5			10
33	(Chile) Alberto Heller												5		10
34	(Paraguay) Andrea Lafarja			8		20		7				11	WD		10
35	(Netherlands) Bernhard ten Brinke		14		12		6		Ret	15					8
36	(Poland) Jarosław Kołtun	6	19												8
37	(Finland) Tommi Jylhä		6												8
38	(Kenya) Aakif Virani			6											8
39	(Spain) Enrique Cruz					6									8
40	(Japan) Fumio Nutahara							6							8
41	(Paraguay) Augusto Bestard											6			8
42	(Chile) Emilio Rosselot												6		8
43	(Austria) Kevin Raith													6	8
44	(Japan) Takumi Matsushita									8	8				8
45	(Estonia) Joosep Ralf Nõgene									7	Ret				6
46	(Czech Republic) Filip Kohn	7													6
47	(Kenya) Samman Singh Vohra			7											6
48	(Chile) Pedro Heller												7		6
49	(Italy) Simone Romagna													7	6
50	(Mexico) Miguel Granados		11			15	WD		11			10	9	9	5
51	(Belgium) John Wartique	8	12												4
52	(France) Adrien Mosca					21	16		18		14		8		4
53	(Finland) Marko Viitanen		8												4
54	(Portugal) Armindo Araújo						8								4
55	(Japan) Satoshi Imai							8							4
56	(Paraguay) Miguel Zaldivar Sr.											8			4
57	(Japan) Shotaro Goto									9	12				2
58	(Croatia) Viliam Prodan				9										2
59	(Japan) Osamu Fukunaga							9							2
60	(Paraguay) Miguel Ortega											9			2
61	(Austria) Johannes Keferböck	12			10	16			19	16	16				1
62	(France) Eliott Delecour	10	17				Ret				Ret				1
63	(Brazil) Cristian Baumgart		10												1
64	(Spain) Ferrán Jubany						10								1
65	(Italy) Fabio Frisiero													10	1
Pos.	Driver	MON (Monaco)	SWE (Sweden)	KEN (Kenya)	CRO (Croatia)	ESP (Spain)	POR (Portugal)	JPN (Japan)	GRE (Greece)	EST (Estonia)	FIN (Finland)	PAR (Paraguay)	CHL (Chile)	ITA (Italy)	Points

Key
Colour	Result
Gold	Winner
Silver	2nd place
Bronze	3rd place
Green	Points finish
Blue	Non-points finish
Blue	Non-classified finish (NC)
Purple	Did not finish (Ret)
Black	Excluded (EX)
Black	Disqualified (DSQ)
White	Did not start (DNS)
White	Cancelled (C)
Blank	Withdrew entry from the event (WD)

=== FIA WRC2 Challenger Championship for Co-Drivers ===
Pos.	Co-driver	MON (Monaco)	SWE (Sweden)	KEN (Kenya)	CRO (Croatia)	ESP (Spain)	POR (Portugal)	JPN (Japan)	GRE (Greece)	EST (Estonia)	FIN (Finland)	PAR (Paraguay)	CHL (Chile)	ITA (Italy)	Points
1	(Estonia) Jakko Viilo			1		NC	NC		1	1	1	16	1	2	142
2	(Finland) Anssi Viinikka		1		3		1		2	2	17			1	109
3	(France) Guillaume Mercoiret	1			1	2			4		7			Ret	85
4	(Kyrgyzstan) Konstantin Aleksandrov	5			2	3		1				4	Ret		79
5	(Italy) Luca Guglielmetti	2			4	1	9		16					3	71
6	(Spain) Rogelio Peñate			3		8		Ret	3			1	4		71
7	(Australia) Daniel Brkic		3		5						9	3	2		59
8	(Sweden) Johan Grönvall		Ret		14	6	4		Ret	3	5				45
9	(Finland) Antti Linnaketo		2							5	2				44
10	(Italy) Marcelo Der Ohannesian			2		NC	3			11	Ret	7	Ret	Ret	38
11	(Spain) Rodrigo Sanjuan de Eusebio					4	2		6	18				Ret	37
12	(Estonia) Siim Oja	NC	12	Ret	6	NC	7	NC		6	4	Ret			34
13	(Italy) Pietro Elia Ometto	14	7			10	12			10	6			7	22
14	(France) Maxence Cornuau	9	9				5		7		10				21
15	(Argentina) Luis Allende											5	5		20
16	(Argentina) Marcelo Toyotoshi								14			2			17
17	(Japan) Hiroki Tachikui							2							17
18	(France) Bastien Pouget	3			Ret	9				13	Ret				17
19	(France) Yannick Roche	Ret			Ret	7	13		5					15	16
20	(Argentina) Rubén García											13	3		15
21	(Estonia) Rait Jansen									Ret	3				15
22	(Japan) Takahiro Yasui							3							15
23	(United States) Alexander Kihurani	4				17									12
24	(Estonia) Silver Simm									4	19				12
25	(Sweden) Stefan Gustavsson		4												12
26	(Poland) Kamil Heller			4											12
27	(Japan) Shungo Azuma							4							12
28	(Spain) Carla Salvat													4	12
29	(Poland) Maciej Baran		5												10
30	(Kenya) Tauseef Khan			5											10
31	(Spain) Yeray Mújica Eugenio					5									10
32	(Spain) Andrés Blanco							5							10
33	(Austria) Claudia Maier													5	10
34	(United Kingdom) Tom Woodburn		13		9		6		Ret	15					10
35	(Poland) Ireneusz Pleskot	6	19												8
36	(Finland) Kimmo Nevanpää		6												8
37	(Kenya) Zahir Shah			6											8
38	(Japan) Yuki Ogawa							6							8
39	(Argentina) José Díaz											6			8
40	(Chile) Matias Leiva												6		8
41	(Italy) Dino Lamonato													6	8
42	(Finland) Pekka Kelander									8	8				8
43	(Estonia) Aleks Lesk									7	Ret				6
44	(Estonia) Aleks Lesk											Ret	7		6
45	(United Kingdom) Ross Whittock	7													6
46	(United Kingdom) Drew Sturrock			7											6
47	(Croatia) Marko Stiperski				7										6
48	(Japan) Misako Saida							7							6
49	(Paraguay) Germán Maune			8		20			14			10	WD		5
50	(Belgium) Maxime Andernack	8	12												4
51	(France) Julie Amblard					21	16		18		14		8		4
52	(Turkey) Onur Vatansever		15		8										4
53	(Spain) Ariday Bonilla		21			Ret	WD		8						4
54	(Finland) Tapio Suominen		8												4
55	(Portugal) Luís Ramalho						8								4
56	(Paraguay) Juan José Sánchez											8			4
57	(Italy) Danilo Fappani													8	4
58	(Turkey) Mehmet Akif Yalçın								9	17	15			10	3
59	(Finland) Jussi Lindberg									9	12				2
60	(Romania) Robert Patrick Fus						Ret							9	2
61	(Argentina) Diego Cagnotti											9			2
62	(France) Sabrina De Castelli	10	17												1
63	(Brazil) Luis Felipe Eckel		10												1
64	(Netherlands) Radboud van Hoek				10										1
65	(Spain) Alejandro López						10								1
66	(Greece) Giorgos Kakavas								10						1
Pos.	Co-driver	MON (Monaco)	SWE (Sweden)	KEN (Kenya)	CRO (Croatia)	ESP (Spain)	POR (Portugal)	JPN (Japan)	GRE (Greece)	EST (Estonia)	FIN (Finland)	PAR (Paraguay)	CHL (Chile)	ITA (Italy)	Points

Key
Colour	Result
Gold	Winner
Silver	2nd place
Bronze	3rd place
Green	Points finish
Blue	Non-points finish
Blue	Non-classified finish (NC)
Purple	Did not finish (Ret)
Black	Excluded (EX)
Black	Disqualified (DSQ)
White	Did not start (DNS)
White	Cancelled (C)
Blank	Withdrew entry from the event (WD)
