= Rallying in Italy =

Car rallies in Italy

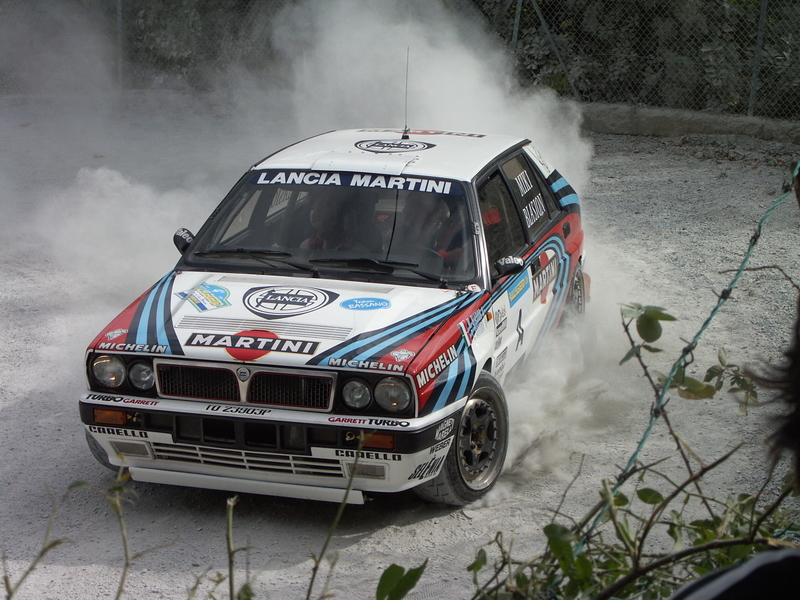
Miki Biasion became the World Rally Champion twice with Lancia Delta Integrale.

Rallying in Italy is a fairly well-practiced motorsport. Italian drivers have become the World Rally Champions twice in history; both were Miki Biasion in the years 1988 and 1989. In 1977, Sandro Munari won the FIA Cup for Drivers (unofficial World Rally Championship Drivers' champion). Italians have also achieved 30 rally wins, the last of which with Piero Liatti at the Monte Carlo Rally in 1997.

== World Rally Championship ==
=== Rally wins in WRC ===
#	Nation	Wins	Drivers	N°
5	Italy	30	Miki Biasion (17), Sandro Munari (7), Raffaele Pinto (1), Fulvio Bacchelli (1), Antonio Fassina (1), Andrea Aghini (1), Gianfranco Cunico (1), Piero Liatti (1)	8

=== Italians at the World Rally Championship ===
Year	Driver	Car	Wins	Podium	Top 10	Points
1997	Piero Liatti	Subaru Impreza WRC	1	3	8	26
1997	Angelo Medeghini	Subaru Impreza 555	0	0	8	26
1997	Andrea Aghini	Toyota Celica GT-Four	0	0	8	26
1998	Piero Liatti	Subaru Impreza WRC	0	2	10	17
1998	Andrea Navarra	Subaru Impreza 555	0	0	10	17
1998	Andrea Aghini	Toyota Corolla WRC	0	0	10	17
1999	Andrea Aghini	Toyota Corolla WRC	0	0	5	3
1999	Piero Liatti	Seat Cordoba WRC	0	0	5	3
1999	Andrea Navarra	Ford Escort RS WRC	0	0	5	3
2000	Piero Liatti	Ford Focus RS WRC	0	0	2	1
2000	Andrea Navarra	Toyota Corolla WRC	0	0	2	1
2001	Renato Travaglia	Peugeot 206 WRC	0	0	2	2
2001	Piero Liatti	Hyundai Accent WRC	0	0	2	2
2002			0	0	0	0
2003			0	0	0	0
2004	Andrea Navarra	Subaru Impreza WRC	0	0	4	10
2004	Gigi Galli	Mitsubishi Lancer Evo	0	0	4	10
2005	Gigi Galli	Mitsubishi Lancer WRC	0	0	7	14
2006	Gigi Galli	Mitsubishi Lancer WRC	0	1	4	15
2006	Gigi Galli	Peugeot 307 WRC	0	1	4	15
2007	Gigi Galli	Citroën Xsara WRC	0	0	2	5
2008	Gigi Galli	Ford Focus RS WRC	0	0	4	17
2009			0	0	0	0
2010			0	0	0	0
2011			0	0	0	0
2012	Luca Pedersoli	Citroën DS3 WRC	0	0	1	1
2013			0	0	0	0
2014	Matteo Gamba	Peugeot 207 S2000	0	0	2	4
2014	Lorenzo Bertelli	Ford Fiesta RS WRC	0	0	2	4
2015	Paolo Andreucci	Peugeot 208 T16	0	0	3	6
2015	Lorenzo Bertelli	Ford Fiesta WRC	0	0	3	6
2016	Lorenzo Bertelli	Ford Fiesta WRC	0	0	2	5
2017			0	0	0	0

== Italian Rally Championship ==
The Italian Rally Championship is held since 1961.

== See also ==
- List of World Rally Championship records
- Lancia in rallying
- Rallye Sanremo
- Rally Italia Sardegna
- Monza Rally Show
