= Lancia Corse HF =

Racing workshop of the Lancia car company

(Italy) Lancia
- Full name: Scuderia Lancia
- Base: Turin, Italy
- Founder(s): Gianni Lancia

Formula One World Championship career
- First entry: 1954 Spanish Grand Prix
- Races entered: 4
- Engines: Lancia
- Constructors' Championships: 0
- Drivers' Championships: 0
- Race victories: 0
- Podiums: 1
- Pole positions: 2
- Fastest laps: 1
- Final entry: 1955 Belgian Grand Prix

The Scuderia Lancia, which later became the Lancia HF Squadra Corse, is the racing workshop of the Lancia car company, created in 1951 by Gianni Lancia, son of the brand's founder. Lancia officially began competing in motor sports, particularly in Sports car racing, where it distinguished itself in the Carrera Panamericana, the Targa Florio and the Mille Miglia. Lancia also entered Formula 1 in 1954–1955, without particularly shining. Lancia bounced back in the World Endurance Championship with three world titles between 1979 and 1981, and in rallying in particularly in International Championship for Manufacturers and World Rally Championship, winning 11 constructors' titles and 5 drivers' titles between 1970 and 1992. Since the end of 1992, Lancia has ceased all official involvement in motor racing. After 33 years, in 2025 Lancia returned to rallying, first in the Italian Rally Championship and then in the European Rally Championship and in 2026 in the World Rally Championship 2 with the Lancia Corse HF.

== Rallying ==
Lancia HF Squadra Corse
- Full name: LANCIA HF SQUADRA CORSE
- Team principal(s): Cesare Fiorio

World Rally Championship history
- Debut: 1970 Monte Carlo Rally (Note: International Championship for Manufacturers)
- Last event: 1992 RAC Rally
- Last season: 1992
- Manufacturers' Championships: 11 (1972,1974, 1975, 1976, 1983, 1987, 1988, 1989, 1990, 1991, 1992)
- Drivers' Championships: 5 (1977 (Note: FIA Cup for Rally Drivers), 1987, 1988, 1989, 1991)
- Rally wins: 73

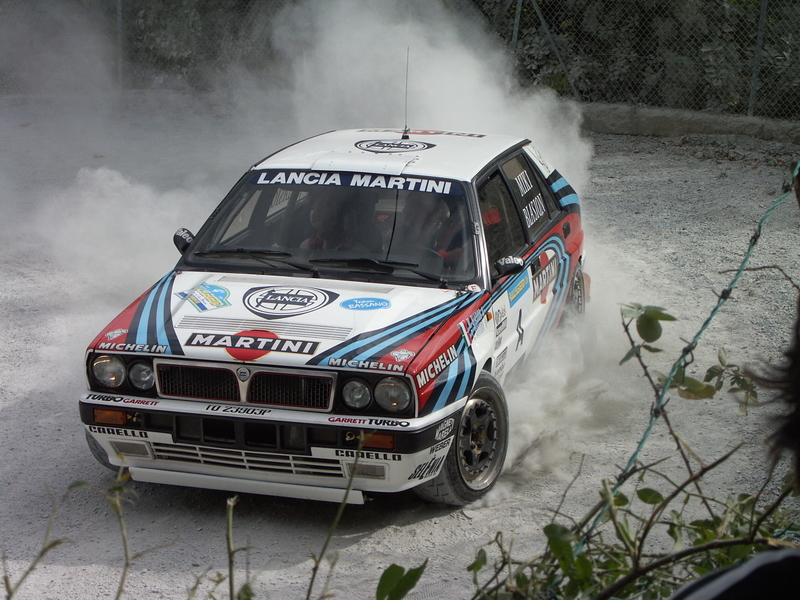
Twice world rally champion, the Italian Miki Biasion and his Lancia Delta Integrale in the colors of Martini Racing.

Prior to the forming of the World Rally Championship, Lancia took the final International Championship for Manufacturers title with the Fulvia in 1972. In the WRC, they remain the most statistically successful marque (despite having withdrawn at the end of the 1993 season), winning constructors' titles with the Stratos (1974, 1975 and 1976), the 037 (1983) and the Delta (six consecutive wins from 1987 to 1992). The Delta is also the most successful individual model designation ever to compete in rallying. All this gave Lancia a total of 10 championships over the years.

Juha Kankkunen and Miki Biasion both won two drivers' titles with the Delta. Among other drivers to take several World Rally Championship wins with Lancia were Markku Alén, Didier Auriol, Sandro Munari, Bernard Darniche, Walter Röhrl, Björn Waldegård and Henri Toivonen. The history of the brand in rallying is also tainted with tragedy, with deaths of Italian driver Attilio Bettega at the 1985 Tour de Corse in a Lancia 037 and then Finnish championship favourite Toivonen in a Lancia Delta S4 at the same rally exactly a year later. These deaths would eventually lead to the end of Group B rallying.

=== Martini Racing ===
In 1982, just as they had done one year previously with sports cars, Martini Racing signed with the works Lancia team, sponsoring the brand new Group B Lancia 037, with Attilio Bettega and Markku Alén as drivers. The Lancia Martini partnership in the World Rally Championship was one of the company's longest, remaining until the end of the 1992 season, with several cars, including the Group B Delta S4 and Group A Delta Integrale winning events and titles with drivers such as Juha Kankkunen, Bruno Saby, Massimo Biasion and Didier Auriol. The Martini Lancia cars won the WRC Drivers' title in 1987 and 1991 with Kankkunen, and 1988 and 1989 with Biasion, as well as the Constructors' title with the 037 in 1983, and consecutively with the Group A Delta from 1987 to 1992. In 1993, Martini managed a smaller sponsorship program, restricted to the Italian Rally Championship with Italian rallyman Dario Cerrato

=== Lancia Corse HF ===
Lancia Corse HF
- Founded: 2024
- Team principal(s): Eugenio Franzetti (2024–2026); Luca Martello (2026–present)

FIA WRC2 Championship history
- First season: 2026
- Debut: 2026 Monte Carlo Rally
- First win: 2026 Croatia Rally
- Last win: 2026 Rally Chile
- Teams' Championships: 1 (2026)
- Drivers' Championships: 0
- Rallies: 7 (Note: 2026 WRC2 Championship for Teams)
- Rally wins: 5
- Podiums: 12

After more than 30 years, Lancia officially returns to rallying with the Lancia Ypsilon, from which two rally cars have been developed, the Lancia Ypsilon Rally4 HF for the Rally4 Group in 2024 and the Lancia Ypsilon Rally2 HF Integrale for the Rally2 Group in 2025. In 2025, the Ypsilon Rally4 HF competed in both the Italian Rally Championship, with a single-make trophy, the Trofeo Lancia Rally, and in the European Rally Championship. In 2026, the Ypsilon Rally2 HF Integrale competed in the WRC2. On 21 January 2026, the Ypsilon Rally2 HF Integrale made its debut in the 2026 Monte Carlo Rally. On 12 April 2026, the Lancia Ypsilon Rally2 HF Integrale achieved its first victory in the World Rally Championship 2, in the 2026 Croatia Rally, won by driver Yohan Rossel and co-driver Arnaud Dunand. A victory in the World Rally Championship that Lancia had not achieved for 34 years since the 1992 season. Lancia enthusiasts, "lancisti", had been waiting for decades for this return to victory in the World Rally Championship. On 26 April 2026, the Lancia Ypsilon Rally2 HF Integrale driven by Yohan Rossel and co-driver Arnaud Dunand achieved its second victory at the 2026 Rally Islas Canarias. The driver Yohan Rossel and the co-driver Arnaud Dunand proved to be precise, solid and effective with a Lancia Ypsilon Rally2 HF Integrale, which is equally reliable, solid and fast. On 31 August 2026, Lancia Corse HF won the 2026 WRC2 Championship for Teams.

== Sports car ==
| Year | Car | Image | Category |
|---|---|---|---|
| 1953 | Lancia D20 | | Sports Car |
| 1953 | Lancia D23 | | Sports Car |
| 1953 | Lancia D24 | | Sports Car |
| 1954 | Lancia D25 | | Sports Car |

== Formula One ==
| Year | Car | Image | Category |
|---|---|---|---|
| 1954 | Lancia D50 | | Formula One |

== Rally cars ==
| Year | Car | Image | Category |
|---|---|---|---|
| 1963 | Lancia Flavia Coupé HF 1.5 | | Group 2 |
| 1964 | Lancia Flavia Coupé HF 1.8 | | Group 1 Group 2 |
| 1969 | Lancia Fulvia Coupé HF 1.6 | | Group 4 |
| 1973 | Lancia Stratos HF | | Group 4 |
| 1974 | Lancia Beta Coupé 8-valve | | Group 3 |
| 1974 | Lancia Beta Coupé 16-valve | | Group 4 |
| 1982 | Lancia Rally 037 | | Group B |
| 1985 | Lancia Delta S4 | | Group B |
| 1987 | Lancia Delta HF 4WD | | Group A |
| 1988 | Lancia Delta HF integrale 8v | | Group A |
| 1989 | Lancia Delta HF integrale 16v | | Group A |
| 1992 | Lancia Delta HF integrale Evo | | Group A |
| 2025 | Lancia Ypsilon Rally4 HF | | Group Rally4 |
| 2026 | Lancia Ypsilon Rally2 HF Integrale | | Group Rally2 |
| 2027 | Lancia Ypsilon Rally1 HF Integrale (WRC27) | | Group Rally1 (WRC27) |

== Rally car prototypes ==
| Year | Car | Image | Category |
|---|---|---|---|
| 1986 | Lancia ECV | | Group S |
| 1988 | Lancia ECV 2 | | Group S |

== World Sportscar Championship ==
| Year | Car | Image | Category |
|---|---|---|---|
| 1966 | Lancia Fulvia HF | | Group 4 |
| 1974 | Lancia Stratos HF Turbo | | Group 5 |
| 1979 | Lancia Montecarlo Turbo | | Group 5 |
| 1982 | Lancia LC1 | | Group 6 |
| 1983 | Lancia LC1 Coupé | | Group C |
| 1983 | Lancia LC2 | | Group C1 |

== Competition results ==
=== Formula One ===
==== World Championship Grand Prix results ====
Includes results of Lancia Grand Prix cars entered by other entities.

| Year | Entrant | Chassis | Engine | Tyres | Drivers | 1 | 2 | 3 | 4 | 5 | 6 | 7 | 8 | 9 | Points | WCC |
|---|---|---|---|---|---|---|---|---|---|---|---|---|---|---|---|---|
| 1954 | Scuderia Lancia | Lancia D50 | Lancia 2.5 V8 | **P** | | ARG | 500 | BEL | FRA | GBR | GER | SUI | ITA | ESP | -* | -* |
| 1954 | Scuderia Lancia | Lancia D50 | Lancia 2.5 V8 | **P** | (Italy) Alberto Ascari | | | | | | | | | Ret^{P}^{F} | -* | -* |
| 1954 | Scuderia Lancia | Lancia D50 | Lancia 2.5 V8 | **P** | (Italy) Luigi Villoresi | | | | | | | | | Ret | -* | -* |
| 1955 | Scuderia Lancia | Lancia D50 | Lancia 2.5 V8 | **P** | | ARG | MON | 500 | BEL | NED | GBR | ITA | | | -* | -* |
| 1955 | Scuderia Lancia | Lancia D50 | Lancia 2.5 V8 | **P** | (Italy) Alberto Ascari | Ret | Ret | | | | | | | | -* | -* |
| 1955 | Scuderia Lancia | Lancia D50 | Lancia 2.5 V8 | **P** | (Italy) Luigi Villoresi | Ret/ Ret^{†} | 5 | | | | | | | | -* | -* |
| 1955 | Scuderia Lancia | Lancia D50 | Lancia 2.5 V8 | **P** | (Monaco) Louis Chiron | | 6 | | | | | | | | -* | -* |
| 1955 | Scuderia Lancia | Lancia D50 | Lancia 2.5 V8 | **P** | (Italy) Eugenio Castellotti | Ret^{†} | 2 | | Ret^{P} | | | | | | -* | -* |
| 1955 | Scuderia Ferrari | Lancia D50 | Lancia 2.5 V8 | **E** | (Italy) Eugenio Castellotti | | | | | | | DNS | | | -* | -* |
| 1955 | Scuderia Ferrari | Lancia D50 | Lancia 2.5 V8 | **E** | (Italy) Giuseppe Farina | | | | | | | DNS | | | -* | -* |
| 1956 | Scuderia Ferrari | Lancia D50 | Lancia 2.5 V8 | **P**/**E** | | ARG | MON | 500 | BEL | FRA | GBR | GER | ITA | | -* | -* |
| 1956 | Scuderia Ferrari | Lancia D50 | Lancia 2.5 V8 | **P**/**E** | (Argentina) Juan Manuel Fangio | Ret^{P}/ 1^{F}^{†} | 4^{P}^{†}/ 2^{F}^{†} | | Ret^{P} | 4^{P}^{F} | 1 | 1^{P}^{F} | 9^{P}^{†}/ 2^{†} | | -* | -* |
| 1956 | Scuderia Ferrari | Lancia D50 | Lancia 2.5 V8 | **P**/**E** | (Italy) Luigi Musso | 1^{†} | Ret | | | | | Ret^{†} | 5 | | -* | -* |
| 1956 | Scuderia Ferrari | Lancia D50 | Lancia 2.5 V8 | **P**/**E** | (Italy) Eugenio Castellotti | Ret | Ret/ 4^{†} | | Ret | 2 | 11^{†} | Ret/ Ret^{†} | Ret/ 9^{†} | | -* | -* |
| 1956 | Scuderia Ferrari | Lancia D50 | Lancia 2.5 V8 | **P**/**E** | (Belgium) Olivier Gendebien | DNS | | | | Ret | DNA | | | | -* | -* |
| 1956 | Scuderia Ferrari | Lancia D50 | Lancia 2.5 V8 | **P**/**E** | (United Kingdom) Peter Collins | | 2^{†} | | 1 | 1 | Ret/ 2^{†} | Ret/ Ret^{†} | 2^{†} | | -* | -* |
| 1956 | Scuderia Ferrari | Lancia D50 | Lancia 2.5 V8 | **P**/**E** | (Belgium) Paul Frère | | | | 2 | | | | | | -* | -* |
| 1956 | Scuderia Ferrari | Lancia D50 | Lancia 2.5 V8 | **P**/**E** | (Belgium) André Pilette | | | | 6 | | | | | | -* | -* |
| 1956 | Scuderia Ferrari | Lancia D50 | Lancia 2.5 V8 | **P**/**E** | (Spain) Alfonso de Portago | | | | | Ret | 2^{†}/ 11^{†} | Ret^{†} | Ret | | -* | -* |
| 1956 | Scuderia Ferrari | Lancia D50 | Lancia 2.5 V8 | **P**/**E** | (Germany) Wolfgang von Trips | | | | | | | | DNS | | -* | -* |
| 1957 | Scuderia Ferrari | Lancia D50 | Lancia 2.5 V8 | **P**/**E** | | ARG | MON | 500 | FRA | GBR | GER | PES | ITA | | -* | -* |
| 1957 | Scuderia Ferrari | Lancia D50 | Lancia 2.5 V8 | **P**/**E** | (United Kingdom) Peter Collins | Ret/ 6^{†} | Ret | | 3 | Ret/ 4^{†} | 3 | | Ret | | -* | -* |
| 1957 | Scuderia Ferrari | Lancia D50 | Lancia 2.5 V8 | **P**/**E** | (Italy) Luigi Musso | Ret | | | 2^{P}^{F} | 2 | 4 | Ret | 8 | | -* | -* |
| 1957 | Scuderia Ferrari | Lancia D50 | Lancia 2.5 V8 | **P**/**E** | (Italy) Eugenio Castellotti | Ret | | | | | | | | | -* | -* |
| 1957 | Scuderia Ferrari | Lancia D50 | Lancia 2.5 V8 | **P**/**E** | (United Kingdom) Mike Hawthorn | Ret | Ret/ Ret^{†} | | 4 | 3 | 2 | | 6 | | -* | -* |
| 1957 | Scuderia Ferrari | Lancia D50 | Lancia 2.5 V8 | **P**/**E** | (Argentina) José Froilán González | 5^{†} | | | | | | | | | -* | -* |
| 1957 | Scuderia Ferrari | Lancia D50 | Lancia 2.5 V8 | **P**/**E** | (Spain) Alfonso de Portago | 5^{†} | | | | | | | | | -* | -* |
| 1957 | Scuderia Ferrari | Lancia D50 | Lancia 2.5 V8 | **P**/**E** | (Germany) Wolfgang von Trips | 6^{†} | Ret^{†} | | | | | | 3 | | -* | -* |
| 1957 | Scuderia Ferrari | Lancia D50 | Lancia 2.5 V8 | **P**/**E** | (Italy) Cesare Perdisa | 6^{†} | | | | | | | | | -* | -* |
| 1957 | Scuderia Ferrari | Lancia D50 | Lancia 2.5 V8 | **P**/**E** | (France) Maurice Trintignant | | 5 | | Ret | 4^{†} | DNA | | | | -* | -* |

* Constructor's Championship not awarded until 1958.

† Indicates shared drive

==== Non-Championship results ====
(results in bold indicate pole position; results in italics indicate fastest lap)

| Year | Entrant | Chassis | Engine | Driver | 1 | 2 | 3 | 4 | 5 | 6 | 7 | 8 | 9 | 10 | 11 | 12 | 13 | 14 | 15 | 16 | 17 | 18 |
|---|---|---|---|---|---|---|---|---|---|---|---|---|---|---|---|---|---|---|---|---|---|---|
| 1955 | Scuderia Lancia | Lancia D50 | Lancia DS50 2.5 V8 | | NZL | BUE | VAL | PAU | GLO | BOR | INT | NAP | ALB | CUR | COR | LON | DRT | RED | DTT | OUL | AVO | SYR |
| 1955 | Scuderia Lancia | Lancia D50 | Lancia DS50 2.5 V8 | (Italy) Alberto Ascari | | | 1^{P} | 5^{P}^{F} | | | | 1^{P} | | | | | | | | | | |
| 1955 | Scuderia Lancia | Lancia D50 | Lancia DS50 2.5 V8 | (Italy) Luigi Villoresi | | | 3 | 4 | | | | 3 | | | | | | | | | | |
| 1955 | Scuderia Lancia | Lancia D50 | Lancia DS50 2.5 V8 | (Italy) Eugenio Castellotti | | | 4 | 2 | | | | | | | | | | | | | | |
| 1955 | Scuderia Ferrari | Lancia D50 | Lancia DS50 2.5 V8 | (Italy) Eugenio Castellotti | | | | | | | | | | | | | | | | 7 | | |
| 1955 | Scuderia Ferrari | Lancia D50 | Lancia DS50 2.5 V8 | (United Kingdom) Mike Hawthorn | | | | | | | | | | | | | | | | 2^{P} | | |
| 1956 | Scuderia Ferrari | Lancia D50 | Lancia DS50 2.5 V8 | | BUE | GLV | SYR | AIN | INT | NAP | 100 | VNW | CAE | SUS | BRH | | | | | | | |
| 1956 | Scuderia Ferrari | Lancia D50 | Lancia DS50 2.5 V8 | (Argentina) Juan Manuel Fangio | 1^{P}^{F} | | 1^{P}^{F} | | Ret | | | | | | | | | | | | | |
| 1956 | Scuderia Ferrari | Lancia D50 | Lancia DS50 2.5 V8 | (Italy) Eugenio Castellotti | Ret | | Ret | | | Ret^{P} | | | | | | | | | | | | |
| 1956 | Scuderia Ferrari | Lancia D50 | Lancia DS50 2.5 V8 | (Italy) Luigi Musso | Ret | | 2 | | | Ret^{F} | | | | | | | | | | | | |
| 1956 | Scuderia Ferrari | Lancia D50 | Lancia DS50 2.5 V8 | (United Kingdom) Peter Collins | | | 3 | | Ret | | | | | | | | | | | | | |
| 1957 | Scuderia Ferrari | Lancia D50 | Lancia DS50 2.5 V8 | | BUE | SYR | PAU | GLV | NAP | RMS | CAE | INT | MOD | MOR | | | | | | | | |
| 1957 | Scuderia Ferrari | Lancia D50 | Lancia DS50 2.5 V8 | (United Kingdom) Peter Collins | 3^{F}^{†}/ 8^{F}^{†} | 1^{P} | | | 1 | Ret | | | | | | | | | | | | |
| 1957 | Scuderia Ferrari | Lancia D50 | Lancia DS50 2.5 V8 | (Italy) Eugenio Castellotti | 5^{†} | | | | | | | | | | | | | | | | | |
| 1957 | Scuderia Ferrari | Lancia D50 | Lancia DS50 2.5 V8 | (Italy) Luigi Musso | 3^{†}/ 5^{†} | 2 | | | | 1 | | | | | | | | | | | | |
| 1957 | Scuderia Ferrari | Lancia D50 | Lancia DS50 2.5 V8 | (Italy) Cesare Perdisa | 7 | | | | | | | | | | | | | | | | | |
| 1957 | Scuderia Ferrari | Lancia D50 | Lancia DS50 2.5 V8 | (Germany) Wolfgang von Trips | 8^{†} | | | | | | | | | | | | | | | | | |
| 1957 | Scuderia Ferrari | Lancia D50 | Lancia DS50 2.5 V8 | (United States) Masten Gregory | Ret | | | | | | | | | | | | | | | | | |
| 1957 | Scuderia Ferrari | Lancia D50 | Lancia DS50 2.5 V8 | (United Kingdom) Mike Hawthorn | | | | | 2^{P}^{F} | Ret | | | | | | | | | | | | |
| 1957 | Scuderia Ferrari | Lancia D50 | Lancia DS50 2.5 V8 | (Belgium) Olivier Gendebien | | | | | | Ret | | | | | | | | | | | | |

=== Rallying ===
==== WRC Results (Group B era) ====
| Year | Car | Driver | 1 | 2 | 3 | 4 | 5 | 6 | 7 | 8 | 9 | 10 | 11 | 12 | 13 | WDC | Points | WMC | Points |
|---|---|---|---|---|---|---|---|---|---|---|---|---|---|---|---|---|---|---|---|
| 1982 | Lancia 037 | (Finland) Markku Alén | MON | SWE | POR | KEN | FRA; 9 | GRE; Ret | NZL | BRA | FIN; Ret | ITA; Ret | CIV | GBR; 4 | | 21st | 12 | 9th | 25 |
| 1982 | Lancia 037 | (Italy) Attilio Bettega | MON | SWE | POR | KEN | FRA; Ret | GRE | NZL | BRA | FIN | ITA | CIV | GBR | | - | 0 | 9th | 25 |
| 1982 | Lancia 037 | (Italy) Adartico Vudafieri | MON | SWE | POR | KEN | FRA | GRE; Ret | NZL | BRA | FIN | ITA | CIV; Ret | GBR | | - | 0 | 9th | 25 |
| 1982 | Lancia 037 | (Italy) Fabrizio Tabaton | MON | SWE | POR | KEN | FRA | GRE | NZL | BRA | FIN | ITA; Ret | CIV | GBR | | - | 0 | 9th | 25 |
| 1983 | Lancia 037 | (Germany) Walter Röhrl | MON; 1 | SWE | POR; 3 | KEN | FRA; 2 | GRC; 1 | NZL; 1 | ARG | FIN | ITA; 2 | CIV | GBR | | **2nd** | **102** | **1st** | **118** |
| 1983 | Lancia 037 | (Finland) Markku Alén | MON; 2 | SWE | POR; 4 | KEN | FRA; 1 | GRC; 2 | NZL | ARG; 5 | FIN; 3 | ITA; 1 | CIV | GBR | | **3rd** | **100** | **1st** | **118** |
| 1983 | Lancia 037 | (France) Jean-Claude Andruet | MON; 8 | SWE | POR | KEN | FRA; Ret | GRC | NZL | ARG | FIN | ITA | CIV | GBR | | 41st | 3 | **1st** | **118** |
| 1983 | Lancia 037 | (Italy) Adartico Vudafieri | MON | SWE | POR; 5 | KEN | FRA | GRC | NZL | ARG; Ret | FIN | ITA | CIV | GBR | | 12th* | 20* | **1st** | **118** |
| 1983 | Lancia 037 | (Italy) Attilio Bettega | MON | SWE | POR | KEN | FRA; 4 | GRC; 5 | NZL; 3 | ARG | FIN | ITA; 3 | CIV | GBR | | 7th | 42 | **1st** | **118** |
| 1983 | Lancia 037 | (Argentina) Francisco Mayorga | MON | SWE | POR | KEN | FRA | GRC | NZL | ARG; Ret | FIN | ITA | CIV | GBR | | - | 0 | **1st** | **118** |
| 1983 | Lancia 037 | (Finland) Pentti Airikkala | MON | SWE | POR | KEN | FRA | GRC | NZL | ARG | FIN; 5 | ITA | CIV | GBR | | 21st | 8 | **1st** | **118** |
| 1984 | Lancia 037 | (Finland) Markku Alén | MON; 8 | SWE | POR; 2 | KEN; 4 | FRA; 1 | GRC; 3 | NZL; 2 | ARG | FIN; 2 | ITA; Ret | CIV | GBR | | **3rd** | **90** | **2nd** | **108** |
| 1984 | Lancia 037 | (France) Jean-Claude Andruet | MON; Ret | SWE | POR | KEN | FRA; 6 | GRC | NZL | ARG | FIN | ITA | CIV | GBR | | 30th | 6 | **2nd** | **108** |
| 1984 | Lancia 037 | (Italy) Attilio Bettega | MON; 5 | SWE | POR; 3 | KEN | FRA; 7 | GRC; 4 | NZL | ARG | FIN | ITA; 2 | CIV | GBR | | 5th | 49 | **2nd** | **108** |
| 1984 | Lancia 037 | (Finland) Henri Toivonen | MON | SWE | POR; Ret | KEN | FRA | GRC; Ret | NZL | ARG | FIN; 3 | ITA | CIV | GBR | | 16th | 12 | **2nd** | **108** |
| 1984 | Lancia 037 | (Kenya) Vic Preston Jr | MON | SWE | POR | KEN; 6 | FRA | GRC | NZL | ARG | FIN | ITA | CIV | GBR | | 30th | 6 | **2nd** | **108** |
| 1985 | Lancia 037 | (Finland) Markku Alén | MON | SWE | POR | KEN; Ret | FRA; Ret | GRC | NZL | ARG | FIN; 3 | ITA; 4 | CIV | GBR | | 7th | 37 | **3rd** | **70** |
| 1985 | Lancia 037 | (Finland) Henri Toivonen | MON; 6 | SWE | POR | KEN | FRA | GRC | NZL | ARG | FIN; 4 | ITA; 3 | CIV | GBR | | 6th | 48 | **3rd** | **70** |
| 1985 | Lancia 037 | (Italy) Attilio Bettega | MON | SWE | POR | KEN; Ret | FRA; Ret | GRC | NZL | ARG | FIN | ITA | CIV | GBR | | - | 0 | **3rd** | **70** |
| 1985 | Lancia 037 | (Kenya) Vic Preston Jr | MON | SWE | POR | KEN; Ret | FRA | GRC | NZL | ARG | FIN | ITA | CIV | GBR | | - | 0 | **3rd** | **70** |
| 1985 | Lancia Delta S4 | (Finland) Markku Alén | | | | | | | | | | | | GBR; 2 | | - | 0 | **3rd** | **70** |
| 1985 | Lancia Delta S4 | (Finland) Henri Toivonen | | | | | | | | | | | | GBR; 1 | | - | 0 | **3rd** | **70** |
| 1986 | Lancia Delta S4 | (Finland) Markku Alén | MON; Ret | SWE; 2 | POR; Ret | | FRA; Ret | GRC; Ret | NZL; 2 | ARG; 2 | FIN; 3 | CIV | ITA; 1 | GBR; 2 | USA; 1 | **2nd** | **104** | **2nd** | **122** |
| 1986 | Lancia Delta S4 | (Finland) Henri Toivonen | MON; 1 | SWE; Ret | POR; Ret | KEN | FRA; Ret | GRC | NZL | ARG | FIN | CIV | ITA | GBR | USA | 13th | 20 | **2nd** | **122** |
| 1986 | Lancia Delta S4 | (Italy) Miki Biasion | MON; 68 | SWE | POR; Ret | | FRA; Ret | GRC; 2 | NZL; 3 | ARG; 1 | FIN | CIV | ITA; 3 | GBR | USA | 5th | 47 | **2nd** | **122** |
| 1986 | Lancia Delta S4 | (Sweden) Mikael Ericsson | MON | SWE | POR | KEN | FRA | GRC; Ret | NZL; 4 | ARG | FIN; 5 | CIV | ITA | GBR; Ret | USA | - | 0 | **2nd** | **122** |
| 1986 | Lancia Delta S4 | (Argentina) Jorge Recalde | MON | SWE | POR | KEN | FRA | GRC | NZL | ARG; 4 | FIN | CIV | ITA | GBR | USA | 22nd | 10 | **2nd** | **122** |
| 1986 | Lancia Delta S4 | (Sweden) Kalle Grundel | MON | SWE | POR | KEN | FRA | GRC | NZL | ARG | FIN; 6 | CIV | ITA | GBR | USA | 9th* | 26* | **2nd** | **122** |
| 1986 | Lancia 037 | (Finland) Markku Alén | | | | KEN; 3 | | | | | | | | | | | | **2nd** | **122** |
| 1986 | Lancia 037 | (Italy) Miki Biasion | | | | KEN; Ret | | | | | | | | | | | | **2nd** | **122** |
| 1986 | Lancia 037 | (Kenya) Greg Criticos | MON | SWE | POR | KEN; 9 | FRA | GRC | NZL | ARG | FIN | CIV | ITA | GBR | USA | 60th | 2 | **2nd** | **122** |
| 1986 | Lancia 037 | (Kenya) Johnny Hellier | MON | SWE | POR | KEN; 10 | FRA | GRC | NZL | ARG | FIN | CIV | ITA | GBR | USA | 70th | 1 | **2nd** | **122** |
| 1986 | Lancia 037 | (Kenya) Vic Preston Jr | MON | SWE | POR | KEN; Ret | FRA | GRC | NZL | ARG | FIN | CIV | ITA | GBR | USA | - | 0 | **2nd** | **122** |

==== WRC Results (Group A era) ====
| Year | Car | Driver | 1 | 2 | 3 | 4 | 5 | 6 | 7 | 8 | 9 | 10 | 11 | 12 | 13 | 14 | WDC | Points | WMC | Points |
|---|---|---|---|---|---|---|---|---|---|---|---|---|---|---|---|---|---|---|---|---|
| 1987 | Lancia Delta HF 4WD | (Finland) Juha Kankkunen | MON; 2 | SWE; 3 | POR; 4 | KEN | FRA | GRC; 2 | USA; 1 | NZL | ARG | FIN; 5 | CIV | ITA | GBR; 1 | | **1st** | **100** | 1st | 140 |
| 1987 | Lancia Delta HF 4WD | (Italy) Miki Biasion | MON; 1 | SWE | POR; 8 | KEN | FRA; 3 | GRC; 7 | USA; 2 | NZL | ARG; 1 | FIN | CIV | ITA; 1 | GBR | | **2nd** | **94** | 1st | 140 |
| 1987 | Lancia Delta HF 4WD | (Finland) Markku Alén | MON | SWE; 5 | POR; 1 | KEN | FRA | GRE; 1 | USA; 3 | NZL | ARG | FIN; 1 | CIV | ITA; Ret | GBR; 5 | | **3rd** | **88** | 1st | 140 |
| 1987 | Lancia Delta HF 4WD | (France) Bruno Saby | MON; Ret | SWE | POR | KEN | FRA; Ret | GRE | USA | NZL | ARG | FIN | CIV | ITA | GBR | | - | 0 | 1st | 140 |
| 1987 | Lancia Delta HF 4WD | (Sweden) Mikael Ericsson | MON | SWE; 2 | POR | KEN | FRA | GRE | USA | NZL | ARG | FIN | CIV | ITA | GBR; 4 | | 10th | 28 | 1st | 140 |
| 1987 | Lancia Delta HF 4WD | (Kenya) Vic Preston Jr | MON | SWE | POR | KEN; 14 | FRA | GRE | USA | NZL | ARG | FIN | CIV | ITA | GBR | | - | 0 | 1st | 140 |
| 1987 | Lancia Delta HF 4WD | (France) Yves Loubet | MON | SWE | POR | KEN | FRA; 2 | GRE | USA | NZL | ARG | FIN | CIV | ITA | GBR | | 20th | 15 | 1st | 140 |
| 1987 | Lancia Delta HF 4WD | (Argentina) Jorge Recalde | MON | SWE | POR | KEN | FRA | GRE | USA | NZL | ARG; 2 | FIN | CIV | ITA | GBR | | 9th* | 30* | 1st | 140 |
| 1988 | Lancia Delta HF 4WD Lancia Delta Integrale | (Italy) Miki Biasion | MON; Ret | SWE | POR; 1 | KEN; 1 | FRA | GRC; 1 | USA; 1 | NZL | ARG; 2 | FIN | CIV | ITA; 1 | GBR | | **1st** | **115** | 1st | 140 |
| 1988 | Lancia Delta HF 4WD Lancia Delta Integrale | (France) Bruno Saby | MON; 1 | SWE | POR | KEN | FRA; 3 | GRC | USA | NZL | ARG | FIN | CIV | ITA | GBR | | 6th | 32 | 1st | 140 |
| 1988 | Lancia Delta HF 4WD Lancia Delta Integrale | (France) Yves Loubet | MON; Ret | SWE | POR | KEN | FRA; 2 | GRC | USA | NZL | ARG | FIN | CIV | ITA | GBR | | 10th* | 27* | 1st | 140 |
| 1988 | Lancia Delta HF 4WD Lancia Delta Integrale | (Sweden) Mikael Ericsson | MON | SWE; Ret | POR; Ret | KEN | FRA | GRC; 2 | USA | NZL | ARG | FIN; 2 | CIV | ITA | GBR; Ret | | 8th | 30 | 1st | 140 |
| 1988 | Lancia Delta HF 4WD Lancia Delta Integrale | (Finland) Markku Alén | MON | SWE; 1 | POR; 6 | KEN | FRA | GRE; 4 | USA | NZL | ARG | FIN; 1 | CIV | ITA; 4 | GBR; 1 | | **2nd** | **86** | 1st | 140 |
| 1988 | Lancia Delta HF 4WD Lancia Delta Integrale | (Kenya) Vic Preston Jr | MON | SWE | POR | KEN; Ret | FRA | GRC | USA | NZL | ARG | FIN | CIV | ITA | GBR | | - | 0 | 1st | 140 |
| 1988 | Lancia Delta HF 4WD Lancia Delta Integrale | (Argentina) Jorge Recalde | MON | SWE | POR | KEN | FRA | GRC | USA | NZL | ARG; 1 | FIN | CIV | ITA | GBR | | 9th* | 27* | 1st | 140 |
| 1989 | Lancia Delta Integrale Lancia Delta Integrale 16V | (Italy) Miki Biasion | SWE | MON; 1 | POR; 1 | KEN; 1 | FRA | GRC; 1 | NZL | ARG | FIN; 6 | AUS | ITA; 1 | CIV | GBR | | **1st** | **106** | 1st | 140 |
| 1989 | Lancia Delta Integrale Lancia Delta Integrale 16V | (France) Didier Auriol | SWE | MON; 2 | POR; Ret | KEN | FRA; 1 | GRC; 2 | NZL | ARG | FIN; Ret | AUS | ITA; Ret | CIV | GBR | | 5th | 50 | 1st | 140 |
| 1989 | Lancia Delta Integrale Lancia Delta Integrale 16V | (France) Bruno Saby | SWE | MON; 3 | POR | KEN | FRA; Ret | GRC | NZL | ARG | FIN | AUS | ITA | CIV | GBR | | 25th | 12 | 1st | 140 |
| 1989 | Lancia Delta Integrale Lancia Delta Integrale 16V | (Finland) Markku Alén | SWE | MON | POR; 2 | KEN | FRA | GRE | NZL | ARG | FIN; Ret | AUS; 3 | ITA | CIV | GBR | | 9th | 27 | 1st | 140 |
| 1989 | Lancia Delta Integrale Lancia Delta Integrale 16V | (Argentina) Jorge Recalde | SWE | MON | POR | KEN; Ret | FRA | GRC | NZL | ARG; 3 | FIN | AUS | ITA | CIV | GBR | | 15th* | 20* | 1st | 140 |
| 1989 | Lancia Delta Integrale Lancia Delta Integrale 16V | (France) Yves Loubet | SWE | MON | POR | KEN | FRA; 4 | GRC | NZL | ARG | FIN | AUS | ITA | CIV | GBR | | 29th | 10 | 1st | 140 |
| 1989 | Lancia Delta Integrale Lancia Delta Integrale 16V | (Sweden) Mikael Ericsson | SWE | MON | POR | KEN | FRA | GRC | NZL | ARG; 1 | FIN | AUS | ITA | CIV | GBR | | 4th* | 50* | 1st | 140 |
| 1990 | Lancia Delta Integrale 16V | (Italy) Miki Biasion | MON; 3 | POR; 1 | KEN; Ret | FRA | GRC; 3 | NZL | ARG; 1 | FIN | AUS | ITA; Ret | CIV | GBR; 3 | | | 4th | 76 | 1st | 137 |
| 1990 | Lancia Delta Integrale 16V | (Finland) Juha Kankkunen | MON; Ret | POR; 3 | KEN; 2 | FRA | GRC; 2 | NZL | ARG; Ret | FIN; 5 | AUS; 1 | ITA; 2 | CIV | GBR; Ret | | | **3rd** | **85** | 1st | 137 |
| 1990 | Lancia Delta Integrale 16V | (France) Didier Auriol | MON; 1 | POR; 2 | KEN | FRA; 1 | GRC; Ret | NZL | ARG; 3 | FIN; Ret | AUS; Ret | ITA; 1 | CIV | GBR; 5 | | | **2nd** | **95** | 1st | 137 |
| 1990 | Lancia Delta Integrale 16V | (Italy) Alex Fiorio | MON | POR | KEN; Ret | FRA | GRC | NZL | ARG | FIN | AUS; 3 | ITA | CIV | GBR | | | 9th* | 25* | 1st | 137 |
| 1990 | Lancia Delta Integrale 16V | (France) Yves Loubet | MON | POR | KEN | FRA; Ret | GRC | NZL | ARG | FIN | AUS | ITA | CIV | GBR | | | - | 0 | 1st | 137 |
| 1991 | Lancia Delta Integrale 16V | (Italy) Miki Biasion | MON; 2 | SWE | POR; 3 | KEN; Ret | FRA | GRC; 3 | NZL | ARG; 2 | FIN | AUS | ITA; 2 | CIV | ESP | GBR; Ret | 4th | 69 | 1st | 137 |
| 1991 | Lancia Delta Integrale 16V | (Finland) Juha Kankkunen | MON; 5 | SWE | POR; 4 | KEN; 1 | FRA | GRC; 1 | NZL; 2 | ARG; 4 | FIN; 1 | AUS; 1 | ITA; Ret | CIV | ESP; 2 | GBR; 1 | **1st** | **150** | 1st | 137 |
| 1991 | Lancia Delta Integrale 16V | (Argentina) Jorge Recalde | MON | SWE | POR | KEN; 3 | FRA | GRC | NZL | ARG; 5 | FIN | AUS; 8 | ITA | CIV | ESP | GBR | 9th* | 29* | 1st | 137 |
| 1991 | Lancia Delta Integrale 16V | (France) Bruno Saby | MON | SWE | POR | KEN | FRA; Ret | GRC | NZL | ARG | FIN | AUS | ITA | CIV | ESP | GBR | 33rd* | 8* | 1st | 137 |
| 1991 | Lancia Delta Integrale 16V | (France) Yves Loubet | MON | SWE | POR | KEN | FRA; 6 | GRC | NZL | ARG | FIN | AUS | ITA | CIV | ESP | GBR | 33rd* | 8* | 1st | 137 |
| 1992 | Lancia Delta Integrale HF | (Finland) Juha Kankkunen | MON; 3 | SWE | POR; 1 | KEN; 2 | FRA | GRC; 2 | NZL | ARG | FIN; 2 | AUS; 2 | ITA; 2 | CIV | ESP; 2 | GBR; 3 | **2nd** | **134** | 1st | 140 |
| 1992 | Lancia Delta Integrale HF | (France) Didier Auriol | MON; 1 | SWE | POR; Ret | KEN | FRA; 1 | GRC; 1 | NZL | ARG; 1 | FIN; 1 | AUS; 1 | ITA; Ret | CIV | ESP; 10 | GBR; Ret | **3rd** | **121** | 1st | 140 |
| 1992 | Lancia Delta Integrale HF | (Italy) Andrea Aghini | MON | SWE | POR; Ret | KEN | FRA; 6 | GRE | NZL | ARG | FIN | AUS | ITA; 1 | CIV | ESP; 3 | GBR; 10 | 7th | 39 | 1st | 140 |
| 1992 | Lancia Delta Integrale HF | (Sweden) Björn Waldegård | MON | SWE | POR | KEN; Ret | FRA | GRE | NZL | ARG | FIN | AUS | ITA | CIV | ESP | GBR | - | 0 | 1st | 140 |
| 1992 | Lancia Delta Integrale HF | (Argentina) Jorge Recalde | MON | SWE | POR | KEN; 3 | FRA | GRE | NZL | ARG; Ret | FIN | AUS | ITA | CIV | ESP | GBR | 10th* | 28* | 1st | 140 |
| 1992 | Lancia Delta Integrale HF | (France) Philippe Bugalski | MON | SWE | POR | KEN | FRA; 3 | GRE | NZL | ARG | FIN; 9 | AUS | ITA | CIV | ESP | GBR | 13th* | 22* | 1st | 140 |

== Titles ==
=== World Rally Championship ===
- FIA International Championship for Manufacturers – 1 (1972)
- FIA World Rally Championship for Manufacturers – 10 (1974, 1975, 1976, 1983, 1987, 1988, 1989, 1990, 1991 and 1992)
- FIA Cup for Rally Drivers – 1 (Sandro Munari in 1977)
- FIA World Rally Championship for Drivers – 4 (Juha Kankkunen in 1987 and 1991, and Miki Biasion in 1988 and 1989)

=== World Rally Championship 2 ===
- FIA World Rally Championship 2 for Teams – 1 (Lancia Corse HF in 2026)

=== European Rally Championship ===
- FIA European Rally Championship for Drivers – 15 (Harry Källström in 1969, Sandro Munari in 1973, Bernard Darniche in 1976 and 1977, Tony Carello in 1978, Miki Biasion in 1983, Carlo Capone in 1984, Dario Cerrato in 1985 and 1987, Fabrizio Tabaton in 1986 and 1988, Yves Loubet in 1989, Robert Droogmans in 1990, Piero Liatti in 1991 and Pierre-César Baroni in 1993)

=== European Rallycross Championship ===
- FIA European Rallycross Championship for Drivers – 1 (Franz Wurz in 1976)

=== Italian Rally Championship ===
- Italian Rally Championship for Manufacturers – 24 (1965, 1966, 1967, 1968, 1969, 1971, 1972, 1973, 1976, 1977, 1978, 1979, 1982, 1983, 1984, 1985, 1986, 1987, 1988, 1989, 1990, 1991, 1992, 1993)
- Italian Rally Championship for Manufacturers (2WD) - 1 (2025)
- Italian Rally Championship for Drivers (2WD) - 1 (Gianandrea Pisani in 2025)

=== Spanish Rally Championship ===
- Spanish Rally Championship for Drivers – 6 (Jorge de Bagration in 1979 and 1981, Salvador Servia in 1985 and 1986, Jesús Puras in 1990 and 1992)

=== French Rally Championship ===
- French Rally Championship for Drivers – 2 (Bernard Darniche in 1976 and 1978)

=== Deutsche Rallye-Meisterschaft ===
- German Rally Championship for Drivers – 1 (Ronald Holzer in 1980)

=== World Sportscar Championship ===
- FIA 1979 World Championship for Makes (under 2-litre division)
- FIA 1980 World Championship for Makes (overall)
- FIA 1981 World Endurance Championship for Makes (overall)

=== Deutsche Rennsport Meisterschaft ===
- Deutsche Rennsport Meisterschaft Championship – 1 (Hans Heyer in 1980)

== See also ==
- Lancia in motorsport
- Martini Racing
- Rallying in Italy

== Bibliography ==
- Robert Weber (September 2019). Automobilsport Racing / History / Passion #21: Lancia Rally 1982-86. Sportfahrer Verlag. ISSN 2199-126X.
