= Andrea Navarra =

Italian rally driver (born 1971)

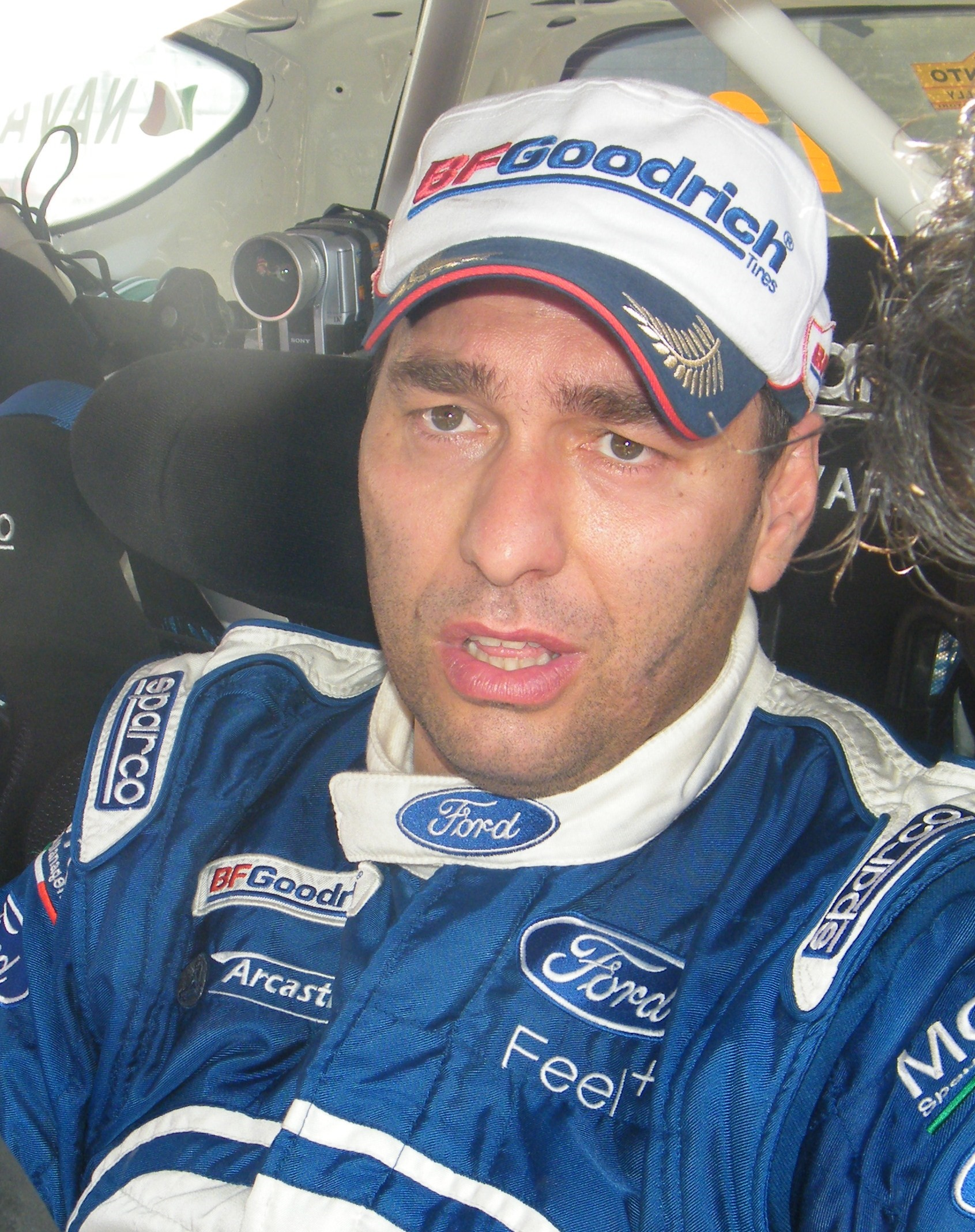

Personal information
- Nationality: (Italy) Italian
- Born: February 25, 1971 (age 55); Cesena, Italy

World Rally Championship record
- Years active: 1995–2000, 2004–2005
- Co-driver: (Italy) Renzo Casazza (Italy) Alessandro Alessandrini (Italy) Simona Fedeli
- Teams: Jolly Club
- Rallies: 18
- Championships: 0
- Rally wins: 0
- Podiums: 0
- Stage wins: 0
- Total points: 8
- First rally: 1995 Rallye de Portugal
- Last rally: 2005 Rally d'Italia Sardegna

Andrea Navarra (born 25 February 1971) is a former rally driver from Italy.

He scored points in the 1995 and 2004 World Rally Championship seasons, and won the European Rally Championship in 1998.

== See also ==
- Rallying in Italy
