= Yves Loubet =

French rally driver (born 1958)

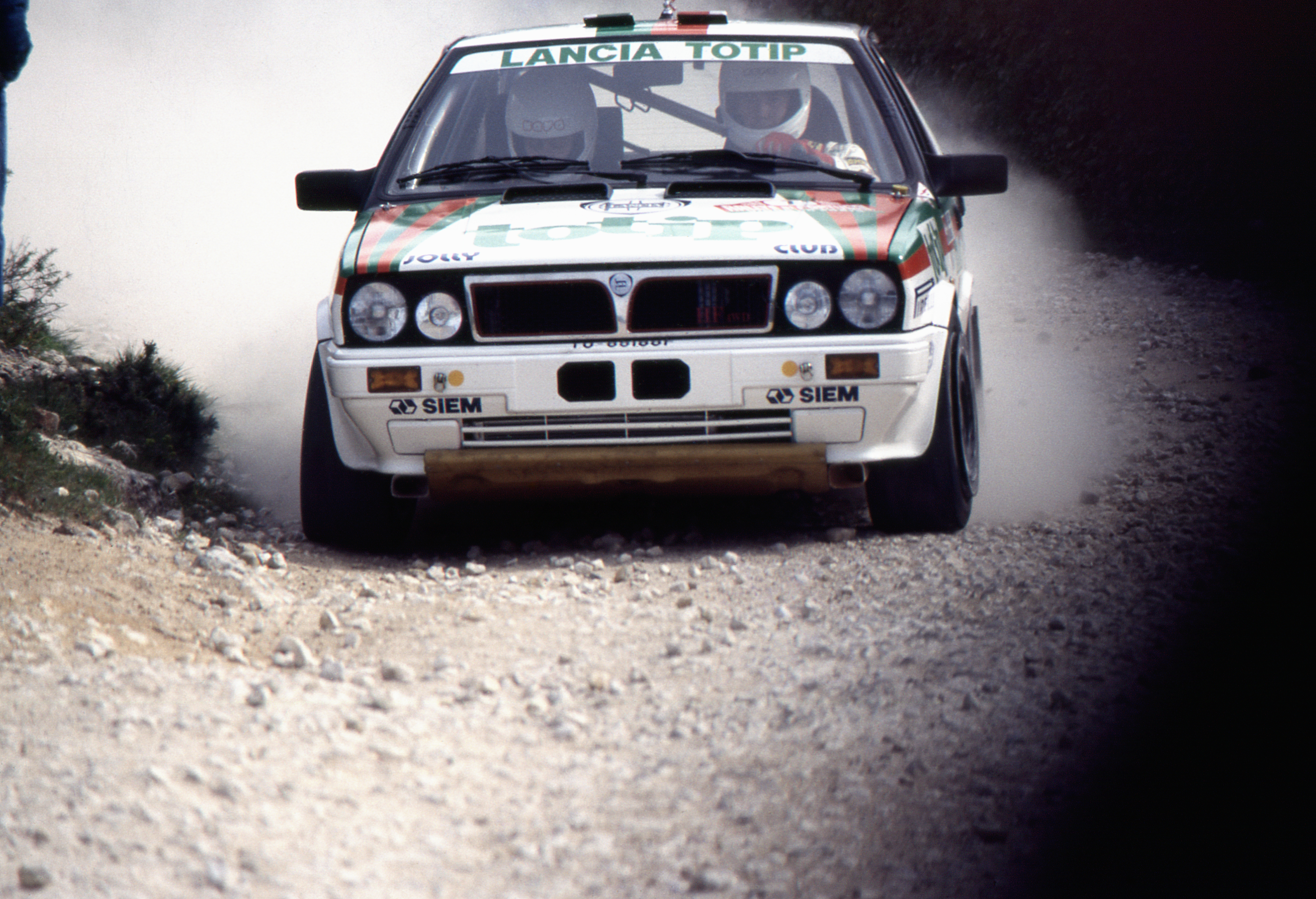
- Yves Loubet driving a Lancia Delta HF 4WD during Rally Portugal, 1988.

Personal information
- Nationality: (France) French
- Born: 31 October 1958 (age 68); Mostaganem

World Rally Championship record
- Years active: 1977 – 1999
- Co-driver: (France) Jean-François Alemany (France) "Toutàfond" (France) Jean-Louis Mérigot (France) Bernard Occelli (France) Patricia Trivero (France) Jean-Bernard Vieu (France) Jean-Marc Andrié (France) Jean-Paul Chiaroni (France) Didier Breton (France) Dominique Savignoni (France) Bruno Brissart
- Teams: Jolly Club, Lancia, Toyota
- Rallies: 30
- Championships: 0
- Rally wins: 0
- Podiums: 4
- Stage wins: 44
- Total points: 192
- First rally: 1977 Rallye Sanremo
- Last rally: 1999 Monte Carlo Rally

Yves Loubet (aka Publimmo), born on October 31, 1958, in Mostaganem (Mostaganem, former French Algeria), is a French retired rally driver . His son, Pierre-Louis Loubet is also a rally driver.

== Career ==
Loubet started racing in 1976 on an Opel Kadett. He has participated in the Tour de Corse (second in 1987 and 1988 on a Lancia Delta HF 4WD and Integrale Official Martini Racing, third in 1986 on Alfa Romeo GTV6 Group A, following the tragic accident of Henri Toivonen and the withdrawal of the other official Lancia), as well as participation in the Rallye San Remo and Monte Carlo.

Loubet was European champion in 1989 on Lancia Delta Integrale, co-driven by Jean-Marc Andrié, and finished vice-champion of France rally in 1985 on an official Alfa Romeo (winner of Group A).

Loubet also participated in 30 rallies counting for the world rally championship and the WRC, from 1977 to 1999.

In 2003, Loubet won the Rallye des Pharaons in rally-raid, with Jacky Dubois as co-driver.

Since 2008, Loubet organizes, with José Andréani, the "Historic" version of the Ronde de la Giraglia.

Loubet organized the Maroc 'Historic' Rally since its first edition in 2009, to keep the spirit of one of the past's toughest rallies, the Rally of Morocco.

On year 2019, the rally's 10th edition has been won by former 'Group N' world champion (1989 and 1990), Alain Oreille, assisted by copilot Sylvie Oreille.

== Achievements ==
- 1999 - 3rd of the Rally of Lebanon (Middle East Championship) - Lancia Delta HF Integrale - co-driver, Bruno Brissart
- 1996 - 2nd of the Rally of the Azores (European Championship and Portugal)
- 1995 - 3rd of the Semperit Rally (European and Austrian championship)
- 1993 - 5th of the French Rally Championship
- 1992 - Rally São Miguel / Azores (European and Portuguese championship)
- 1991 - 2 victories of the French Rally Championship (Rallye du Rouergue and Rallye du Mont-Blanc)
- 1990 - 5th of the French Rally Championship
- 1989 - European Rally Champion - Lancia Delta Integrale, Team Grifone, with 4 victories:
  - 25th Rally Catalunya - Costa Brava (rally of Spain )
  - 30th Rally Vinho da Madeira ( Portugal )
  - 14th Elpa Halkidiki Rally ( Greece )
  - 17th Rally of Cyprus
  - and 2nd of the Albena-Zlatni Piassatzi ( Bulgaria ), Garrigues-Languedoc-Roussillon, and Poland rallies, and 3rd of the Deutschland ADAC Rally
- 1988 - 10th in the World Rally Championship . Victory of the Garrigues-Languedoc-Roussillon Rally ( 2nd Division European and French Championship). 3rd of the automobile Tour of Italy 1985 - 2nd in the French Rally Championship - Alfa Romeo GTV6 Group A

== Results in World Rally Championship ==
- 2nd Tour de Corse 1987 - Lancia Delta HF 4WD Martini Racing
- 2nd Tour de Corse 1988 - Lancia Delta Integrale Martini Racing
- 3rd Tour de Corse 1986 - Alfa Romeo GTV6 Rothmans
- 3rd Portugal Rally 1988 - Lancia Delta Integrale Martini Racing
- 4th Tour de Corse 1989 - Lancia delta Integrale Martini racing
- 5th Tour de Corse 1985 - Alfa Romeo GTV6
