= Targa Florio Rally =

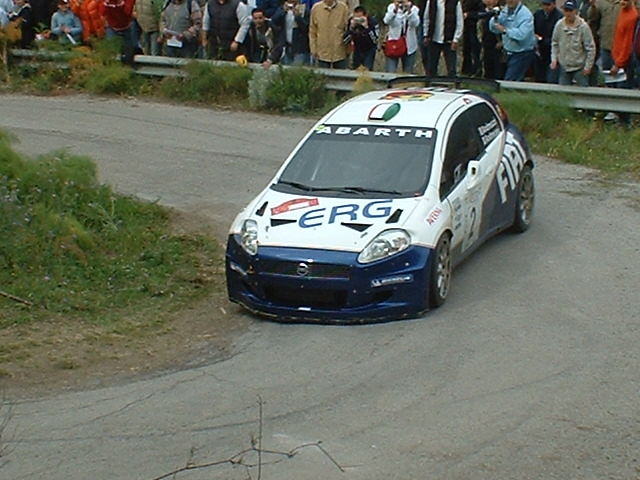
Paolo Andreucci, winner of the 2006 edition

The Targa Florio Rally is a rally auto racing competition held in Sicily. It officially started in 1978 when the Targa Florio transitioned from sports car to rally event, mostly due to safety concerns. The 71 km pattern of Circuito delle Madonie is still used in the same permutation as the original race, and as such the Targa Florio Rally is considered its official continuation. From 1984 to 2011 the Targa Florio was part of the European Rally Championship calendar of events.

== Winners ==
Year	Driver	Co-driver	Car	Championship
1978	(Italy) Antonio Carello	(Italy) Maurizio Perissinot	Lancia Stratos	Italian Rally Championship
1979	(Italy) Adartico Vudafieri	(Italy) Mario Mannucci	Fiat 131 Abarth	Italian Rally Championship
1980	(Italy) Paolo Pasutti	(Italy) Roberto Stradiotto	Fiat 131 Abarth	Italian Rally Championship
1981	(France) Jean-Claude Andruet	(France) "Tilber"	Ferrari 308 GTB	Italian Rally Championship
1982	(Italy) Antonio Tognana	(Italy) Massimo De Antoni	Ferrari 308 GTB	Italian Rally Championship
1983	(Italy) Gianfranco Cunico	(Italy) Ergy Bartolich	Lancia Rally 037	Italian Rally Championship
1984	(Italy) Antonio Fassina	(Italy) Massimo Sghedoni	Lancia Rally 037	European Rally Championship and Italian Rally Championship
1985	(Italy) Dario Cerrato	(Italy) Giuseppe Cerri	Lancia Rally 037	European Rally Championship and Italian Rally Championship
1986	(Italy) Dario Cerrato	(Italy) Giuseppe Cerri	Lancia Delta S4	European Rally Championship and Italian Rally Championship
1987	(Italy) Dario Cerrato	(Italy) Giuseppe Cerri	Lancia Delta 4WD	European Rally Championship and Italian Rally Championship
1988	(Italy) Andrea Zanussi	(Italy) Paolo Amati	BMW M3	European Rally Championship and Italian Rally Championship
1989	(Italy) Dario Cerrato	(Italy) Giuseppe Cerri	Lancia Delta 16V	European Rally Championship and Italian Rally Championship
1990	(Italy) Piero Liatti	(Italy) Luciano Tedeschini	Lancia Delta 16V	European Rally Championship and Italian Rally Championship
1991	(Italy) Piero Longhi	(Italy) Pietro Carraro	Lancia Delta 16V	European Rally Championship and Italian Rally Championship
1992	(Italy) Piergiorgio Deila	(Italy) Pierangelo Scalvini	Lancia Delta 16V	European Rally Championship and Italian Rally Championship
1993	(Italy) Gianfranco Cunico	(Italy) Stefano Evangelisti	Ford Escort Cosworth	European Rally Championship and Italian Rally Championship
1994	(Italy) Gianfranco Cunico	(Italy) Stefano Evangelisti	Ford Escort Cosworth	European Rally Championship and Italian Rally Championship
1995	(Italy) Piero Liatti	(Italy) Alessandro Alessandrini	Subaru Impreza	European Rally Championship and Italian Rally Championship
1996	(Italy) Gianfranco Cunico	(Italy) Stefano Evangelisti	Ford Escort Cosworth	European Rally Championship and Italian Rally Championship
1997	(Italy) Paolo Andreucci	(Italy) Simona Fedeli	Renault Megane Maxi	European Rally Championship and Italian Rally Championship
1998	(Italy) Renato Travaglia	(Italy) Flavio Zanella	Peugeot 306 Maxi	European Rally Championship and Italian Rally Championship
1999	(Italy) Gianfranco Cunico	(Italy) Gigi Pirollo	Subaru Impreza WRC	European Rally Championship and Italian Rally Championship
2000	(Italy) Piero Longhi	(Italy) Lucio Baggio	Toyota Corolla WRC	European Rally Championship and Italian Rally Championship
2001	(Italy) Gianluca Vita	(Italy) Alessandro Mari	Peugeot 306 Maxi	European Rally Championship and Italian Rally Championship
2002	(Italy) Salvatore Riolo	(Italy) Maurizio Marin	Peugeot 306 Kit	European Rally Championship and Italian Rally Championship
2003	(Italy) Paolo Andreucci	(Italy) Anna Andreussi	Fiat Punto S1600	European Rally Championship and Italian Rally Championship
2004	(Italy) Paolo Andreucci	(Italy) Anna Andreussi	Fiat Punto S1600	European Rally Championship and Italian Rally Championship
2005	(Italy) Salvatore Riolo	(Italy) Maurizio Marin	Renault Clio	European Rally Championship and Italian Rally Championship
2006	(Italy) Paolo Andreucci	(Italy) Anna Andreussi	FIAT Grande Punto S2000	European Rally Championship and Italian Rally Championship
2007	(Italy) Paolo Andreucci	(Italy) Anna Andreussi	Mitsubishi Lancer Evo IX	European Rally Championship and Italian Rally Championship
2008	(Italy) Luca Rossetti	(Italy) Matteo Chiarcossi	Peugeot 207 S2000	European Rally Championship and Italian Rally Championship
2009	(Italy) Luca Rossetti	(Italy) Matteo Chiarcossi	Abarth Grande Punto S2000	European Rally Championship and Italian Rally Championship
2010	(Italy) Salvatore Riolo	(Italy) Angelo Carlo Canova	Citroën Xsara WRC	European Rally Championship and Italian Rally Championship
2011	(Italy) Paolo Andreucci	(Italy) Anna Andreussi	Peugeot 207 S2000	European Rally Championship and Italian Rally Championship
2012	(Czech Republic) Jan Kopecký	(Czech Republic) Pavel Dresler	Škoda Fabia S2000	Intercontinental Rally Challenge and Italian Rally Championship
2013	(Italy) Paolo Andreucci	(Italy) Anna Andreussi	Peugeot 207 S2000	Italian Rally Championship
2014	(Italy) Paolo Andreucci	(Italy) Anna Andreussi	Peugeot 208 T16	Italian Rally Championship
2015	(Italy) Paolo Andreucci	(Italy) Anna Andreussi	Peugeot 208 T16	Italian Rally Championship
2016	(Italy) Paolo Andreucci	(Italy) Anna Andreussi	Peugeot 208 T16	Italian Rally Championship
2017	(Italy) Paolo Andreucci	(Italy) Anna Andreussi	Peugeot 208 T16	Italian Rally Championship
2018	(Italy) Andrea Nucita	(Italy) Marco Vozzo	Hyundai i20 R5	Italian Rally Championship
2019	(Italy) Simone Campedelli	(Italy) Tania Canton	Hyundai i20 R5	Italian Rally Championship

=== Most Wins ===
#	Team	Wins
1	(Italy) Lancia	10
1	(France) Peugeot	10
3	(Italy) Fiat	6
4	(United States) Ford	3
5	(Italy) Ferrari	2
5	(France) Renault	2
5	(Japan) Subaru	2
5	(South Korea) Hyundai	2
8	(Germany) BMW	1
8	(France) Citroën	1
8	(Japan) Mitsubishi	1
8	(Czech Republic) Škoda	1
8	(Japan) Toyota	1

#	Driver	Wins
1	(Italy) Paolo Andreucci	11
2	(Italy) Gianfranco Cunico	4
2	(Italy) Dario Cerrato	4
4	(Italy) Salvatore Riolo	3
5	(Italy) Piero Liatti	2
5	(Italy) Piero Longhi	2

== See also ==
- Sanremo Rally (WRC round from 1973 to 2003)
- Rally d'Italia Sardegna (WRC round from 2004)
- Targa Florio
