= Anna Andreussi =

Italian rally co-driver

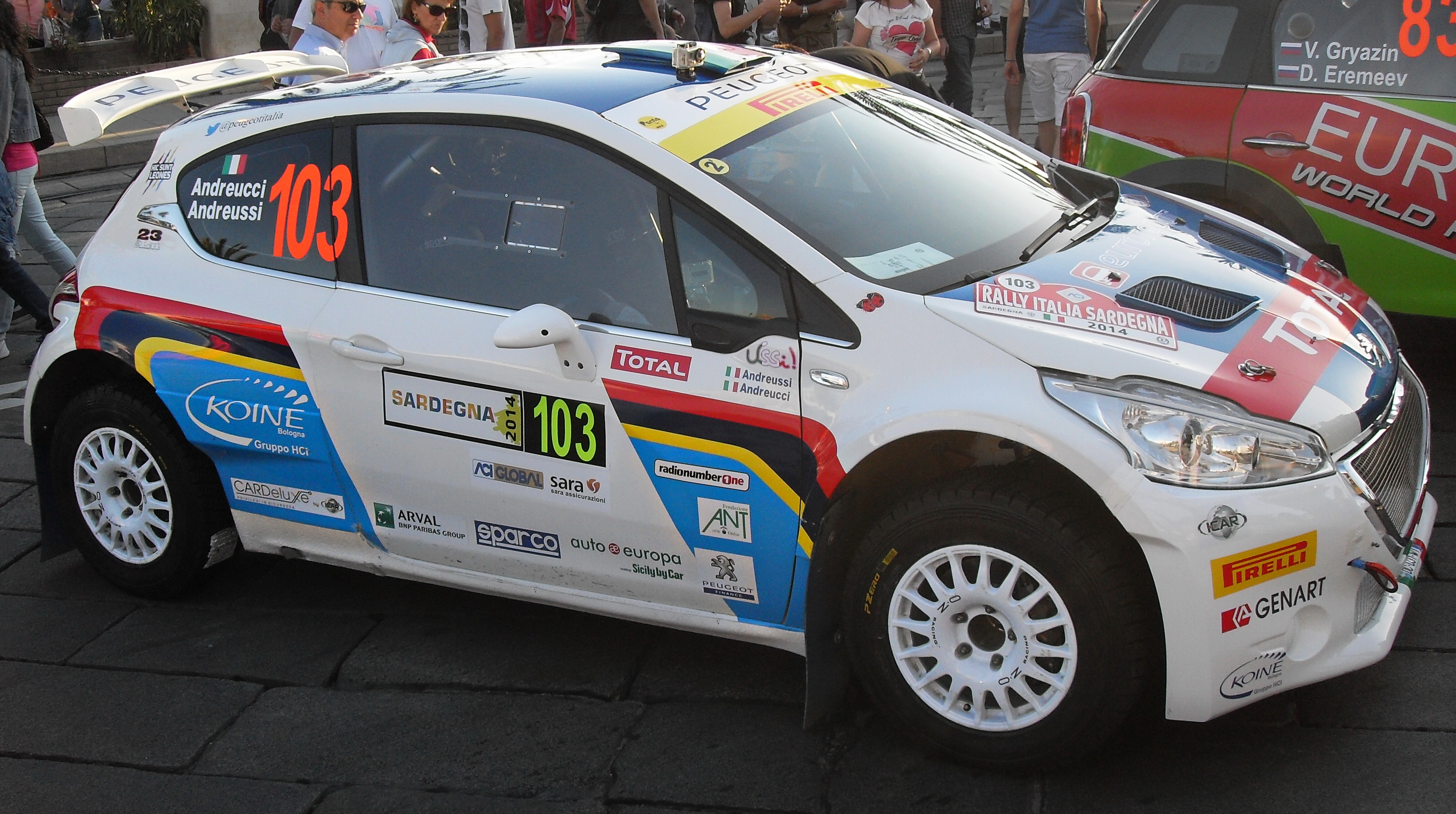
- Peugeot 208 T16 of Andreucci/Andreussi before PS1-Cagliari at the 2014 Rally Italia Sardinia

Personal information
- Nationality: Italian
- Born: 17 April 1972 (age 54); Artegna, Italy

World Rally Championship record
- Years active: 2001–2015
- Teams: Peugeot
- Rallies: 3
- Championships: 0
- Rally wins: 0
- Podiums: 0
- Stage wins: 1
- Total points: 4

Anna Andreussi (born 17 April 1972) is an Italian rally co-driver best known for her partnership with her husband Paolo Andreucci.

== Biography ==
Andreussi debuted in rally competition in 1994, first as a driver and then as a co-driver. In 2001 she became the co-driver of Paolo Andreucci. The two later got married. Andreussi and Andreucci has won ten Italian Rally Championship.

=== WRC results ===
Year	Entrant	Car	1	2	3	4	5	6	7	8	9	10	11	12	13	14	15	Pos.	Points
2001	Ford Motor Co	Focus RS WRC 01	MON	SWE	POR	ESP	ARG	CYP	GRC	KEN	FIN	NZL	ITA; Ret	FRA	AUS	GBR		NC	0
2004	Paolo Andreucci	Fiat Punto S1600	MON	SWE	MEX	NZL	CYP	GRE	TUR	ARG	FIN	GER	JPN	GBR	ITA; 10	FRA	ESP	NC	0
2015	F.P.F. Sport s.r.l.	Peugeot 208 T16 R5	MON	SWE	MEX	ARG	POR	ITA; 8	POL	FIN	GER	AUS	FRA	ESP	GBR			22nd	4

=== IRC results ===
Complete results from 1994 are here.

Year	Entrant	Car	1	2	3	4	5	6	7	8	9	10	11	12	13	Pos.	Points
2006	(Italy) Paolo Andreucci	Fiat Grande Punto Abarth S2000	RSA	YPR	MAD	ITA; 1										2nd	10
2007	(Italy) Ralliart Italia	Mitsubishi Lancer Evolution IX	KEN	TUR	BEL	RUS	POR	CZE	ITA; 5	SWI	CHI					25th	4
2008	(Italy) Ralliart Italia	Mitsubishi Lancer Evolution IX	TUR	POR; Ret	BEL	RUS	POR	CZE	ESP	ITA; 10	SWI	CHI				NC	0
2009	(Italy) Racing Lions SRL	Peugeot 207 S2000	MON	BRA	KEN	POR	BEL	RUS	POR	CZE	ESP	ITA; 5	SCO			24th	4
2010	(Italy) F.P.F. Sport	Peugeot 207 S2000	MON	BRA	ARG	CAN	ITA; 2	BEL	AZO	MAD	CZE	ITA; 1	SCO	CYP		8th	18
2012	(Italy) F.P.F. Sport	Peugeot 207 S2000	AZO	CAN	IRL	COR	ITA; 5	YPR	SMR	ROM	ZLI	YAL	SLI	SAN; 5	CYP	17th	20

== Other results ==
- Italian Rally Championship
  - 9 wins (2003, 2006, 2009, 2010, 2011, 2012, 2014, 2015, 2017)
