= Paolo Andreucci =

Italian rally driver (born 1965)

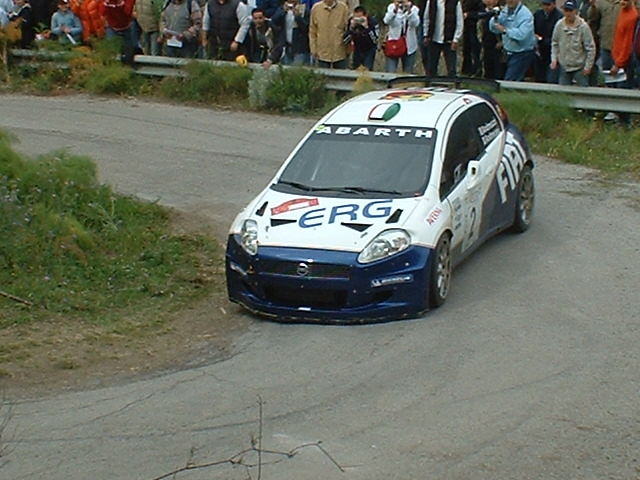
- Paolo Andreucci driving a Fiat Punto at the Rally Targa Florio in 2006.
- Born: 21 April 1965 (age 61) Corneliano d'Alba, Italy
Paolo Andreucci
World Rally Championship record
- Years active: 1989, 1993–1994, 1996–2001, 2004, 2015
- Co-driver: (Italy) Carlo Cassina (Italy) Paolo Amati (Italy) Simona Fedeli (Italy) Giovanni Bernacchini (Italy) Alessandro Giusti (Italy) Anna Andreussi
- Teams: Jolly Club, Ford
- Rallies: 12
- Championships: 0
- Rally wins: 0
- Podiums: 0
- Stage wins: 1
- Total points: 7
- First rally: 1989 Rally de Portugal
- Last rally: 2015 Rally d'Italia

Paolo Andreucci (born 21 April 1965) is an Italian rally driver. He won Rally Sanremo in IRC twice and 11 times Italian Rally Champion.

His co-driver Anna Andreussi is also his wife.

== Career results ==
=== WRC results ===
Year	Entrant	Car	1	2	3	4	5	6	7	8	9	10	11	12	13	14	15	Pos.	Points
1989	Jolly Club	Lancia Delta Integrale	SWE	MON	POR; 8	KEN	FRA	GRE; Ret	NZL	ARG	FIN	AUS	ITA	CIV	GBR			58th	3
1993	Peugeot Talbot Italia	Peugeot 106 S16	MON	SWE	POR	KEN	FRA	GRE	ARG	NZL	FIN	AUS	ITA; Ret	ESP	GBR			NC	0
1994	Italian Promotor Sport	Renault Clio Williams	MON	POR	KEN	FRA	GRE	ARG	NZL	FIN	ITA; 13	GBR						NC	0
1996	Paolo Andreucci	Renault Mégane Maxi	SWE	KEN	IDN	GRE	ARG	FIN	AUS	ITA; 12	ESP							NC	0
1997	Paolo Andreucci	Renault Mégane Maxi	MON	SWE	KEN	POR	ESP	FRA	ARG	GRE	NZL	FIN	IDN	ITA; Ret	AUS	GBR		NC	0
1998	Treviso Rally Team	Renault Mégane Maxi	MON	SWE	KEN	POR	ESP	FRA	ARG	GRE	NZL	FIN	ITA; Ret	AUS	GBR			NC	0
1999	Treviso Rally Team	Subaru Impreza S4 WRC 98	MON	SWE	KEN	POR	ESP	FRA	ARG	GRE	NZL	FIN	CHN	ITA; Ret	AUS	GBR		NC	0
2000	Procar	Subaru Impreza S5 WRC 99	MON	SWE	KEN	POR	ESP	ARG	GRE	NZL	FIN	CYP	FRA	ITA; Ret	AUS	GBR		NC	0
2001	Ford Motor Co. Ltd.	Focus RS WRC 01	MON	SWE	POR	ESP	ARG	CYP	GRC	KEN	FIN	NZL	ITA; Ret	FRA	AUS	GBR		NC	0
2004	Paolo Andreucci	Fiat Punto S1600	MON	SWE	MEX	NZL	CYP	GRE	TUR	ARG	FIN	GER	JPN	GBR	ITA; 10	FRA	ESP	NC	0
2015	F.P.F. Sport s.r.l.	Peugeot 208 T16 R5	MON	SWE	MEX	ARG	POR	ITA; 8	POL	FIN	GER	AUS	FRA	ESP	GBR			22nd	4

=== IRC results ===
Year	Entrant	Car	1	2	3	4	5	6	7	8	9	10	11	12	13	Pos.	Points
2006	(Italy) Paolo Andreucci	Fiat Grande Punto Abarth S2000	RSA	YPR	MAD	ITA; 1										2nd	10
2007	(Italy) Ralliart Italia	Mitsubishi Lancer Evolution IX	KEN	TUR	BEL	RUS	POR	CZE	ITA; 5	SWI	CHI					25th	4
2008	(Italy) Ralliart Italia	Mitsubishi Lancer Evolution IX	TUR	POR; Ret	BEL	RUS	POR	CZE	ESP	ITA; 10	SWI	CHI				NC	0
2009	(Italy) Racing Lions SRL	Peugeot 207 S2000	MON	BRA	KEN	POR	BEL	RUS	POR	CZE	ESP	ITA; 5	SCO			24th	4
2010	(Italy) F.P.F. Sport	Peugeot 207 S2000	MON	BRA	ARG	CAN	ITA; 2	BEL	AZO	MAD	CZE	ITA; 1	SCO	CYP		8th	18
2012	(Italy) F.P.F. Sport	Peugeot 207 S2000	AZO	CAN	IRL	COR	ITA; 5	YPR	SMR	ROM	ZLI	YAL	SLI	SAN; 5	CYP	17th	20

== Other results ==
- Italian Rally Championship
  - 11 wins (2001, 2003, 2006, 2009, 2010, 2011, 2012, 2014, 2015, 2017, 2018)

Sporting positions
Preceded by Piero Longhi	Italian Rally Champion; 2001	Succeeded by Renato Travaglia
Preceded by Renato Travaglia	Italian Rally Champion; 2003	Succeeded by Andrea Navarra
Preceded by Piero Longhi	Italian Rally Champion; 2006	Succeeded by Giandomenico Basso
Preceded by Renato Travaglia	Italian Rally Champion; 2009-2010-2011-2012	Succeeded by Umberto Scandola
Preceded by Umberto Scandola	Italian Rally Champion; 2014–2015	Succeeded by Giandomenico Basso
Preceded by Giandomenico Basso	Italian Rally Champion; 2017	Succeeded by incumbent
