= Italian Rally Championship =

- Campionato Italiano Assoluto Rally Sparco
- Category: Rallying
- Country: Italy
- Inaugural season: 1961; 65 years ago
- Tire suppliers: (Italy) Pirelli P (France) Michelin M
- Drivers' champion: (Italy) Roberto Daprà (2026)
- Co-Drivers' champion: (Italy) Luca Guglielmetti (2026)
- Makes' champion: (Czech Republic) Škoda (2025)
- Official website: www.acisport.it

The Campionato Italiano Rally (CIR) or Italian Rally Championship is the main rally championship, which takes place in Italy. It organized by ACI Sport.

== History ==
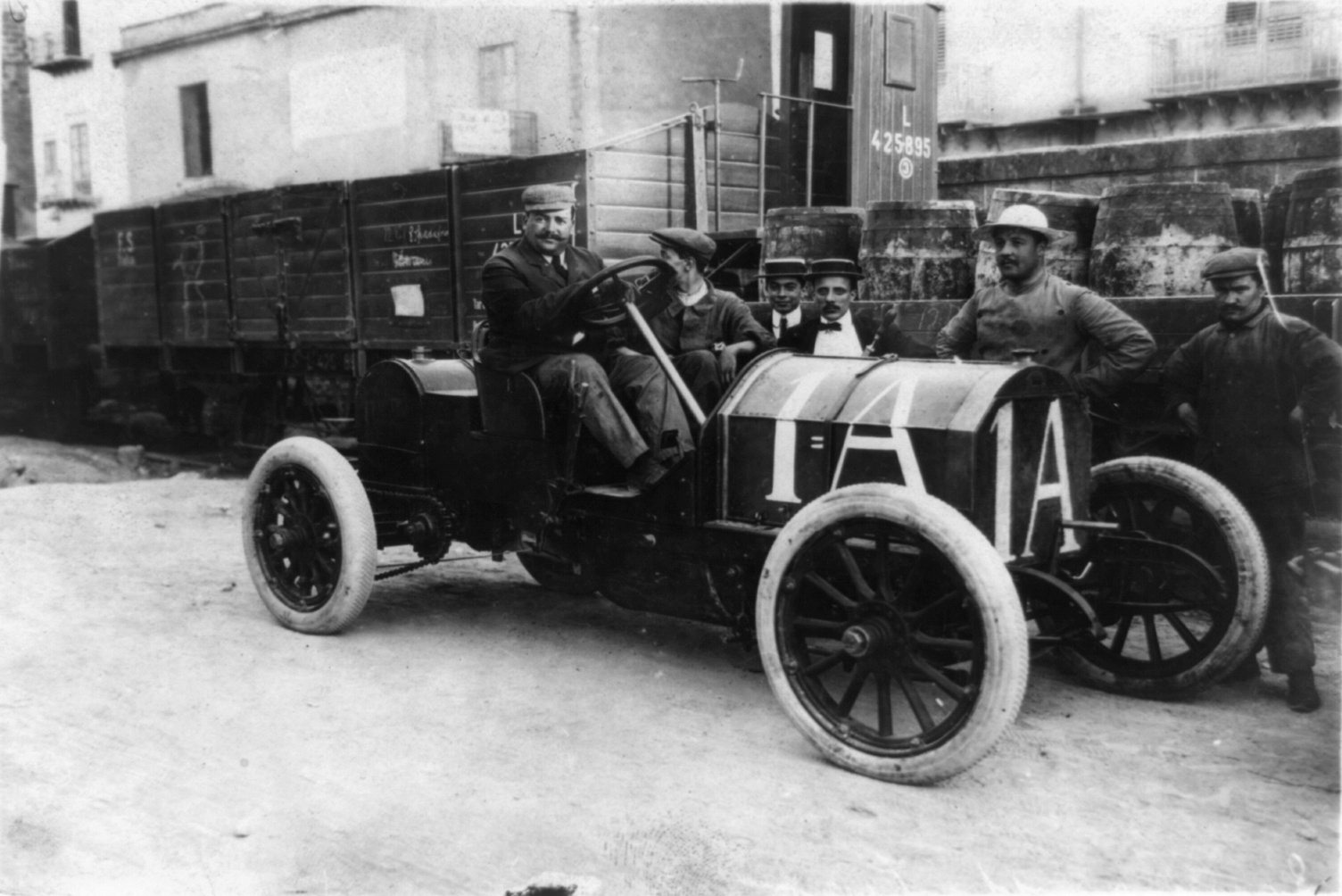
Vincenzo Lancia driving a Fiat 50 hp automobile during the 1908 Targa Florio.

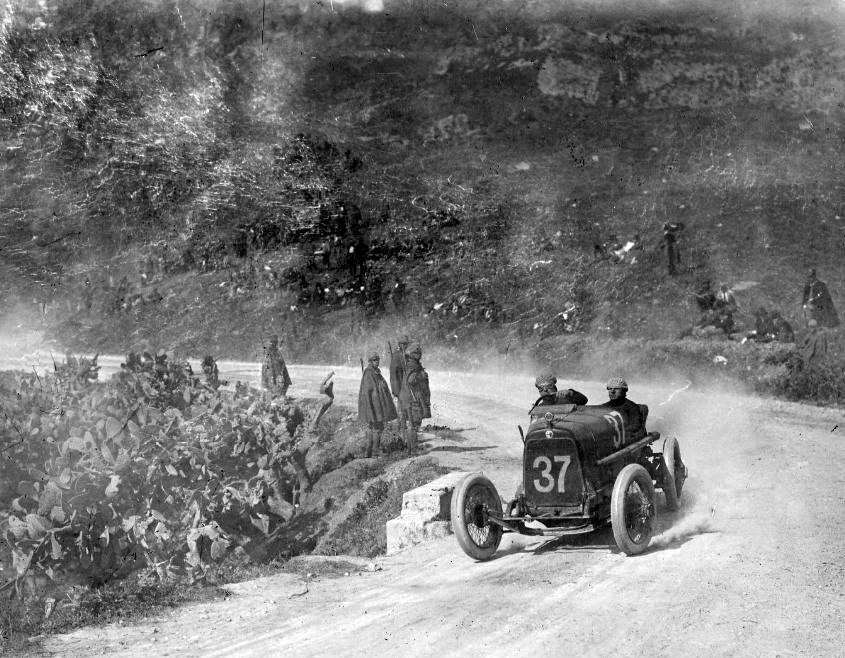
Enzo Ferrari driving an Alfa Romeo at the 1922 Targa Florio

The Italian Rally Championship was officially founded in 1961 with the 21. Coppa Riviera di Ponente. However, rally racing had already taken place in Italy since the late 1940s, in the years following the World War II, with the 1. Stella Alpina Rallye in 1947. But even before the World War II, during the Fascist period, in the 1930s, car races with rally-like characteristics were held, such as the Rome International Rally in 1931. The origin of Italian rallies derived from the first car races of the 1920s such as the Mille Miglia or the even older Targa Florio, in which automotive pioneers such as Vincenzo Lancia and Enzo Ferrari competed. In 1977, following the folded of the Targa Florio for safety reasons, the following year, in 1978, the Targa Florio Rally was established, which is considered its official continuation. Furthermore, the Targa Florio Classica was also established as a historical automotive re-enactment. But also the Mille Miglia in 1977, was re-established both as the Rally 1000 Miglia and as the Mille Miglia Storica. In conclusion, the Italian Rally Championship is not only an Italian sporting rally competition, but is also part of Italy's history and culture. Over the decades, the Italian Rally Championship has contributed to building Italian automotive culture and has also contributed and influenced the European Rally Championship and the World Rally Championship.

Among the first rally races in Italy was the Coppa delle Alpi, held for the first time in 1921, from August 7 to August 15, organised by the Automobile Club Milano. It took place in 5 editions until 1925. Since 2012, the Automobile Club Brescia has re-established it as a historical automotive re-enactment and it is currently included, in 2025, as the first event of the Campionato Italiano Grandi Eventi ACI Sport.

== List of champions ==
Season	Championship for drivers			Championship for manufacturers		
Season	Driver	Co-driver	Car	Manufacturer	Car	Group
1961	(Italy) Luigi Marsaglia	(Italy) Giovanni Prada Moroni	Fiat 1100/103 TV	(Italy) Fiat		
1962	(Italy) Arnaldo Cavallari	(Italy) Dante Salvay	Alfa Romeo Giulietta TI	(Italy) Alfa Romeo		Group 1 Group 2
1963	(Italy) Arnaldo Cavallari	(Italy) Dante Salvay	Alfa Romeo Giulietta TI	(Italy) Alfa Romeo		Group 1 Group 2
1964	(Italy) Arnaldo Cavallari	(Italy) Sandro Munari	Alfa Romeo Giulia TI Super	(Italy) Alfa Romeo		Group 1 Group 2
1965	(Italy) Enzo Martoni	(Italy) Zefferino Filippi	Lancia Fulvia 2C	(Italy) Lancia		Group 2
1966	(Italy) Leo Cella	(Italy) Sergio Barbasio	Lancia Fulvia 1.2 Coupé HF	(Italy) Lancia		Group 2
1967	(Italy) Sandro Munari	(Italy) Luciano Lombardini	Lancia Fulvia 1.3 Coupé HF	(Italy) Lancia		Group 2
1968	(Italy) Arnaldo Cavallari	(Italy) Dante Salvay	Lancia Fulvia 1.3 Coupé HF	(Italy) Lancia		Group 2
1969	(Italy) Sandro Munari	(Italy) Arnaldo Bernacchini	Lancia Fulvia 1.3 Coupé HF	(Italy) Lancia		Group 2
1970	(Italy) Alcide Paganelli	(Italy) Ninni Russo	Fiat 124 Sport Spider	(Italy) Fiat		Group 4
1971	(Italy) Sergio Barbasio	(Italy) Piero Sodano	Lancia Fulvia 1.6 Coupé HF	(Italy) Lancia		Group 4
1972	(Italy) Sergio Barbasio	(Italy) Piero Sodano	Lancia Fulvia 1.6 Coupé HF	(Italy) Lancia		Group 4
1973	(Italy) Amilcare Ballestrieri	(Italy) Silvio Maiga	Lancia Fulvia 1.6 Coupé HF	(Italy) Lancia		Group 4
1974	(Italy) Maurizio Verini	(Italy) Gino Macaluso	Fiat 124 Abarth	(Italy) Fiat		Group 4
1975	(Italy) Roberto Cambiaghi	(Italy) Emanuele Sanfront	Fiat 124 Abarth	(Italy) Fiat		Group 4
1976	(Italy) Antonio "Tony" Fassina	(Italy) Mauro Mannini	Lancia Stratos HF	(Italy) Lancia		Group 4
1977	(Italy) Mauro Pregliasco	(Italy) Vittorio Reisoli	Lancia Stratos HF	(Italy) Lancia		Group 4
1978	(Italy) Adartico Vudafieri	(Italy) Mauro Mannini	Lancia Stratos HF	(Italy) Lancia		Group 4
1979	(Italy) Antonio "Tony" Fassina	(Italy) Mauro Mannini	Lancia Stratos HF	(Italy) Lancia		Group 4
1980	(Italy) Adartico Vudafieri	(Italy) Fabio Penariol	Fiat 131 Abarth	(Italy) Fiat		Group 4
1981	(Italy) Antonio "Tony" Fassina	(Italy) Rudy Dal Pozzo	Opel Ascona 400	(Germany) Opel		Group 4
1982	(Italy) Antonio Tognana	(Italy) Massimo De Antoni	Ferrari 308 GTB; Lancia Rally 037	(Italy) Ferrari (Italy) Lancia		Group 4 Group B
1983	(Italy) Miki Biasion	(Italy) Tiziano Siviero	Lancia Rally 037	(Italy) Lancia		Group B
1984	(Italy) Paolo Fabrizio Fabbri	(Italy) Paolo Cecchini	Fiat Ritmo Abarth 125 TC	(Italy) Fiat		
1984	(Italy) Adartico Vudafieri	(Italy) Luigi Pirollo	Lancia Rally 037	(Italy) Lancia		Open
1985	(Italy) Fabrizio Tabaton	(Italy) Luciano Tedeschini	Lancia Rally 037	(Italy) Lancia		
1985	(Italy) Dario Cerrato	(Italy) Giuseppe Cerri	Lancia Rally 037	(Italy) Lancia		Open
1986	(Italy) Dario Cerrato	(Italy) Giuseppe Cerri	Lancia Delta S4	(Italy) Lancia		
1986	(Italy) Dario Cerrato	(Italy) Giuseppe Cerri	Lancia Delta S4	(Italy) Lancia		Open
1987	(Italy) Michele Rayneri	(Italy) Carlo Cassina	Lancia Rally 037	(Italy) Lancia		Group B
1987	(Italy) Fabrizio Tabaton	(Italy) Luciano Tedeschini	Lancia Delta HF 4WD	(Italy) Lancia		Group A
1988	(Italy) Dario Cerrato	(Italy) Giuseppe Cerri	Lancia Delta HF 4WD	(Italy) Lancia		Group A
1989	(Italy) Dario Cerrato	(Italy) Giuseppe Cerri	Lancia Delta Integrale	(Italy) Lancia		Group A
1990	(Italy) Dario Cerrato	(Italy) Giuseppe Cerri	Lancia Delta Integrale 16v	(Italy) Lancia		Group A
1991	(Italy) Dario Cerrato	(Italy) Giuseppe Cerri	Lancia Delta Integrale 16v	(Italy) Lancia		Group A
1992	(Italy) Piergiorgio Deila	(Italy) Pierangelo Scalvini	Lancia Delta HF Integrale	(Italy) Lancia		Group A
1993	(Italy) Gilberto Pianezzola	(Italy) Loris Roggia	Lancia Delta HF Integrale	(Italy) Lancia		Group A
1994	(Italy) Gianfranco Cunico	(Italy) Stefano Evangelisti	Ford Escort RS Cosworth	(United States) Ford		Group A
1995	(Italy) Gianfranco Cunico	(Italy) Stefano Evangelisti	Ford Escort RS Cosworth	(United States) Ford		Group A
1996	(Italy) Gianfranco Cunico	(Italy) Pierangelo Scalvini	Ford Escort RS Cosworth	(United States) Ford		Group A
1997	(Italy) Andrea Dallavilla	(Italy) Danilo Fappani	Subaru Impreza 555	(Japan) Subaru		Group A
1998	(Italy) Andrea Aghini	(Italy) Loris Roggia	Toyota Corolla WRC	(Japan) Toyota		WRC
1999	(Italy) Andrea Aghini	(Italy) Loris Roggia	Toyota Corolla WRC	(Japan) Toyota		WRC
2000	(Italy) Piero Longhi	(Italy) Lucio Baggio	Toyota Corolla WRC	(Japan) Toyota		WRC
2001	(Italy) Paolo Andreucci	(Italy) Alessandro Giusti	Ford Focus WRC	(United States) Ford		WRC
2002	(Italy) Renato Travaglia	(Italy) Flavio Zanella	Peugeot 206 WRC	(France) Peugeot		WRC
2003	(Italy) Paolo Andreucci	(Italy) Anna Andreussi	Fiat Punto Abarth S1600	(Italy) Fiat		S1600
2004	(Italy) Andrea Navarra	(Italy) Simona Fedeli	Subaru Impreza WRX STi	(Japan) Subaru		Group N
2005	(Italy) Piero Longhi	(Italy) Maurizio Imerito	Subaru Impreza WRX STi	(Japan) Subaru		Group N
2006	(Italy) Paolo Andreucci	(Italy) Anna Andreussi	Fiat Grande Punto Abarth S2000	(Italy) Fiat		S2000
2007	(Italy) Giandomenico Basso	(Italy) Mitia Dotta	Fiat Grande Punto Abarth S2000	(Italy) Fiat		S2000
2008	(Italy) Luca Rossetti	(Italy) Matteo Chiarcossi	Peugeot 207 S2000	(France) Peugeot		S2000
2009	(Italy) Paolo Andreucci	(Italy) Anna Andreussi	Peugeot 207 S2000	(France) Peugeot		S2000
2010	(Italy) Paolo Andreucci	(Italy) Anna Andreussi	Peugeot 207 S2000	(France) Peugeot	Peugeot 207 S2000	S2000
2011	(Italy) Paolo Andreucci	(Italy) Anna Andreussi	Peugeot 207 S2000	(France) Peugeot	Peugeot 207 S2000	S2000
2012	(Italy) Paolo Andreucci	(Italy) Anna Andreussi	Peugeot 207 S2000	(France) Peugeot	Peugeot 207 S2000	S2000
2013	(Italy) Umberto Scandola	(Italy) Guido D'Amore	Škoda Fabia S2000	(France) Peugeot	Peugeot 207 S2000	S2000
2014	(Italy) Paolo Andreucci	(Italy) Anna Andreussi	Peugeot 208 T16 R5	(France) Peugeot	Peugeot 208 T16 R5	Group R5
2015	(Italy) Paolo Andreucci	(Italy) Anna Andreussi	Peugeot 208 T16 R5	(France) Peugeot	Peugeot 208 T16 R5	Group R5
2016	(Italy) Giandomenico Basso	(Italy) Lorenzo Granai	Ford Fiesta R5	(United States) Ford	Ford Fiesta R5	Group R5
2017	(Italy) Paolo Andreucci	(Italy) Anna Andreussi	Peugeot 208 T16 R5	(France) Peugeot	Peugeot 208 T16 R5	Group R5
2018	(Italy) Paolo Andreucci	(Italy) Anna Andreussi	Peugeot 208 T16 R5	(United States) Ford	Ford Fiesta R5	Group R5
2019	(Italy) Giandomenico Basso	(Italy) Lorenzo Granai	Škoda Fabia R5	(France) Citroën	Citroën C3 R5	Group R5
2020	(Italy) Andrea Crugnola	(Italy) Pietro Elia Ometto	Citroën C3 R5	(Czech Republic) Škoda	Škoda Fabia R5	Group R5
2021	(Italy) Giandomenico Basso	(Italy) Lorenzo Granai	Škoda Fabia R5	(Czech Republic) Škoda	Škoda Fabia R5	Group R5
2022	(Italy) Andrea Crugnola	(Italy) Pietro Elia Ometto	Citroën C3 Rally2	(Czech Republic) Škoda	Škoda Fabia Rally2 Evo	Group Rally2
2023	(Italy) Andrea Crugnola	(Italy) Pietro Elia Ometto	Citroën C3 Rally2	(Czech Republic) Škoda	Škoda Fabia Rally2 Evo	Group Rally2
2024	(Italy) Andrea Crugnola	(Italy) Pietro Elia Ometto	Citroën C3 Rally2	(Czech Republic) Škoda	Škoda Fabia RS Rally2	Group Rally2
2025	(Italy) Giandomenico Basso	(Italy) Lorenzo Granai	Škoda Fabia RS Rally2	(Czech Republic) Škoda	Škoda Fabia RS Rally2	Group Rally2
2026	(Italy) Roberto Daprà	(Italy) Luca Guglielmetti	Škoda Fabia RS Rally2	(Czech Republic) Škoda	Škoda Fabia RS Rally2	Group Rally2

=== By manufacturer ===
Manufacturer	Titles	Season(s)
(Italy) Lancia	24	1965, 1966, 1967, 1968, 1969, 1971, 1972, 1973, 1976, 1977, 1978, 1979, 1982, 1983, 1984, 1985, 1986, 1987, 1988, 1989, 1990, 1991, 1992, 1993
(France) Peugeot	10	2002, 2008, 2009, 2010, 2011, 2012, 2013, 2014, 2015, 2017
(Italy) Fiat	9	1961, 1970, 1974, 1975, 1980, 1985, 2003, 2006, 2007
(Czech Republic) Škoda	7	2020, 2021, 2022, 2023, 2024, 2025, 2026
(United States) Ford	6	1994, 1995, 1996, 2001, 2016, 2018
(Italy) Alfa Romeo	3	1962, 1963, 1964
(Japan) Subaru	3	1997, 2004, 2005
(Japan) Toyota	3	1998, 1999, 2000
(Germany) Opel	1	1981
(Italy) Ferrari	1	1982
(France) Citroën	1	2019

== See also ==
- Rallying in Italy
