= Dario Cerrato =

Italian rally driver (born 1951)

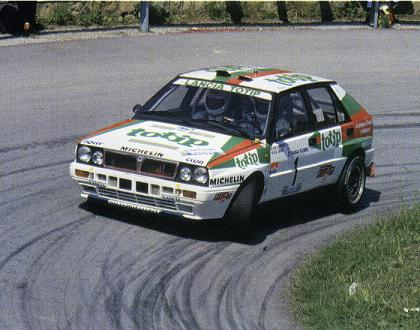
- Cerrato with Lancia Delta Integrale of the Jolly Club at the 1989 Targa Florio
- Born: 2 September 1951 (age 75); Corneliano d'Alba, Italy

Personal information
- Nationality: (Italy) Italian

World Rally Championship record
- Years active: 1974–1975, 1977–1985, 1988–1991, 1993
- Co-driver: (Italy) Giuseppe Cerri (Italy) Pierluigi Cerrato (Italy) Luciano Guizzardi (Italy) Giannantonio Vasino
- Teams: Conrero Squadra Corse, Fiat, Jolly Club
- Rallies: 21
- Championships: 0
- Rally wins: 0
- Podiums: 3
- Stage wins: 26
- Total points: 93
- First rally: 1974 Rallye Sanremo
- Last rally: 1993 Rallye Sanremo

Championship titles
- 1985, 1987 1985, 1986, 1988, 1989, 1990, 1991 1985, 1986 1989: European Rally Championship; Italian Rally Championship; Italian Rally Championship Open Class; Monza Rally Show

Dario Cerrato (born 2 September 1951) is a former Italian rally driver three times on the podium in World Rally Championship races. He won five times the Italian Rally Championship.

== WRC podium ==
Year	Rally	Co-driver	Car	Rank
1986	(Italy) Rally di Sanremo	(Italy) Giuseppe Cerri	Lancia Delta S4	2nd
1988	(Italy) Rally di Sanremo	(Italy) Giuseppe Cerri	Lancia Delta Integrale	3rd
1991	(Italy) Rally di Sanremo	(Italy) Giuseppe Cerri	Lancia Delta Integrale 16V	3rd

== Other results ==
- European Rally Championship
  - 2 wins (1985, 1987)
- Italian Rally Championship
  - 5 wins (1985, 1986, 1988, 1989, 1990, 1991)
