= Monza Rally Show =

Motoring event held at the Autodromo Nazionale di Monza

Monza Rally Rally Di Monza
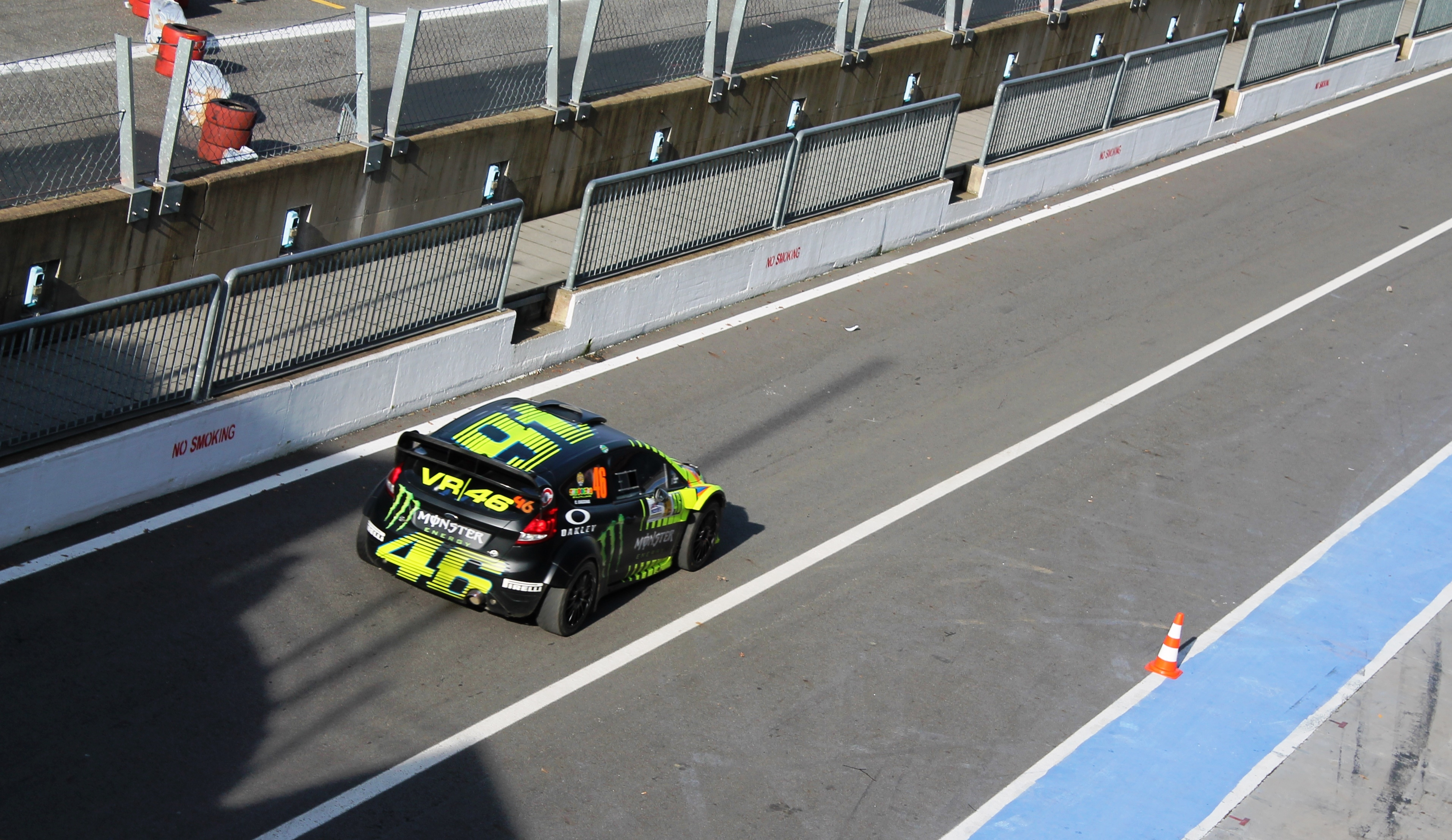
- Valentino Rossi at the 2013 Monza Rally Show with a Ford Fiesta RS WRC
- Status: Active
- Genre: Motorsport event
- Frequency: Annual
- Location: Monza
- Country: Italy
- Inaugurated: 1978

The Monza Rally Show (previously known as Rally di Monza or Rally dell'Autodromo) is a motoring event that has been held since 1978 at the Autodromo Nazionale di Monza, where rally and track racing experts compete, as well as protagonists of the entertainment world and other sports. It usually takes place in the last weeks of November, at the end of the competitive season.

On 9 October 2020, it was announced that Rally Monza would be the final round of the 2020 World Rally Championship season, staging a round of the FIA World Rally Championship for the first time. The event was included in the 2021 World Rally Championship as the last round of the season.

== History ==
The first editions featured a mixed surface, with special stages run both on the paved track and on dirt roads carved in the circuit inland areas. From 1985 onwards the rally became an all-tarmac event. During the 80's and 90's the organizers usually allowed a class for special racing cars, such as touring cars, grand tourers and specially prepared rally cars. In the following years the event gradually changed from a classical rally to a challenge between rally and track racing drivers, as well as characters from the entertainment world and other sports. Since 2003 the name was changed to Monza Rally Show. In 2020 the event was renamed Rally Monza as it became an official World Rally Championship round including stages inside the circuit and public stages north of Bergamo. The event was again included in the 2021 World Rally Championship, as the final round of the season.

== Editions ==
Complete results.

Year	Driver	Co-driver	Car
1978	(Italy) Federico Ormezzano	(Italy) Renato Genova	Porsche 911 Carrera RS 2.7 Gr.3
1979	(Italy) Raffaele Pinto	(Italy) Fabio Penariol	Ferrari 308 GTB Gr.4
1980	(Italy) Federico Ormezzano	(Italy) Renato Genova	Porsche 911 SC Gr.4
1981	(Italy) Federico Ormezzano	(Italy) Claudio Berro	Lancia Stratos Gr.4
1982	(Italy) Federico Ormezzano	(Italy) Claudio Berro	Lancia Stratos Gr.4
1983	(Italy) Adartico Vudafieri	(Italy) Tiziana Borghi	Lancia Rally 037 Gr.B
1984	(Italy) Attilio Bettega	(Italy) Maurizio Perissinot	Lancia Rally 037 Gr.B
1985	(Italy) Adartico Vudafieri	(Italy) Tiziana Borghi	Lancia Rally 037 Gr.B
1986	(Italy) Gianfranco Cunico	(Italy) Gianluigi Scalvini	Lancia Rally 037 Gr.B
1987	(Italy) Fulvio Bacchelli	(Italy) Paolo Spollon	Lancia Rally 037 Gr.B
1988	(Italy) Marco Brand	(Italy) Maria Lechleitner	Lancia Rally 037 Gr.B
1989	(Italy) Dario Cerrato	(Italy) Giuseppe Cerri	Alfa Romeo 75 IMSA
1990	(Italy) Gianfranco Cunico	(Italy) Stefano Evangelisti	BMW M3 Gr.A
1991	(Italy) Andrea Zanussi	(Italy) Paolo Amati	BMW M3 Gr.A
1992	(Italy) Nicola Larini	(Italy) Arnaldo Bernacchini	Alfa Romeo 155 GTA S1
1993	(Italy) Andrea Zanussi	(Italy) Paolo Amati	Ford Escort Cosworth S1
1994	(Italy) Giorgio Francia	(Italy) Monica Bregoli	Alfa Romeo 155 V6 Ti DTM
1995	(Italy) Marco Spinelli	(Italy) Silvio Perlino	Ford Escort Cosworth Gr.A
1996	(Italy) Marco Spinelli	(Italy) Silvio Perlino	Ford Escort Cosworth Gr.S
1997	(Italy) Marco Spinelli	(Italy) Arnaldo Bernacchini	Toyota Celica GT-Four ST205 Gr.A
1998	(Italy) Andrea Dallavilla	(Italy) Daniele Vernuccio	Subaru Impreza WRC
1999	(Italy) Renato Travaglia	(Italy) Flavio Zanella	Peugeot 306 Maxi
2000	(Italy) Rinaldo Capello	(Italy) Dino Zanatta	Subaru Impreza WRC
2001–2002	not held		
2003	(Italy) Alessandro Battaglin	(Italy) Gianni Marchi	Toyota Corolla WRC
2004	(Italy) Rinaldo Capello	(Italy) Luigi Pirollo	Škoda Fabia WRC
2005	(Italy) Rinaldo Capello	(Italy) Luigi Pirollo	Škoda Fabia WRC
2006	(Italy) Valentino Rossi	(Italy) Carlo Cassina	Ford Focus RS WRC
2007	(Italy) Valentino Rossi	(Italy) Carlo Cassina	Ford Focus RS WRC
2008	(Italy) Rinaldo Capello	(Italy) Luigi Pirollo	Ford Focus RS WRC
2009	(Italy) Rinaldo Capello	(Italy) Luigi Pirollo	Citroën C4 WRC
2010	(Spain) Dani Sordo	(Spain) Diego Vallejo	Citroën C4 WRC
2011	(France) Sébastien Loeb	(France) Severine Loeb	Citroën DS3 WRC
2012	(Italy) Valentino Rossi	(Italy) Carlo Cassina	Ford Fiesta RS WRC
2013	(Spain) Dani Sordo	(Spain) Marc Martí	Citroën DS3 WRC
2014	(Poland) Robert Kubica	(Italy) Alessandra Benedetti	Ford Fiesta RS WRC
2015	(Italy) Valentino Rossi	(Italy) Carlo Cassina	Ford Fiesta RS WRC
2016	(Italy) Valentino Rossi	(Italy) Carlo Cassina	Ford Fiesta RS WRC
2017	(Italy) Valentino Rossi	(Italy) Carlo Cassina	Ford Fiesta RS WRC
2018	(Italy) Valentino Rossi	(Italy) Carlo Cassina	Ford Fiesta WRC
2019	(Italy) Andrea Crugnola	(Italy) Marco Bergonzi	Volkswagen Polo GTI R5
2020	(France) Sébastien Ogier	(France) Julien Ingrassia	Toyota Yaris WRC
2021	(France) Sébastien Ogier	(France) Julien Ingrassia	Toyota Yaris WRC
2022	not held		
2023	(Italy) Andrea Mabellini	(Italy) Virginia Lenzi	Škoda Fabia RS Rally2
2024	(Italy) Andrea Crugnola	(Italy) Andrea Sassi	Citroën C3 Rally2

=== Multiple winners ===
Wins	Driver	Years won
7	(Italy) Valentino Rossi	2006–2007, 2012, 2015–2018
5	(Italy) Rinaldo Capello	2000, 2004–2005, 2008–2009
4	(Italy) Federico Ormezzano	1978, 1980–1982
3	(Italy) Marco Spinelli	1995–1997
2	(Italy) Adartico Vudafieri	1983, 1985
2	(Italy) Gianfranco Cunico	1986, 1990
2	(Italy) Andrea Zanussi	1991, 1993
2	(Spain) Dani Sordo	2010, 2013
2	(France) Sébastien Ogier	2020, 2021
2	(Italy) Andrea Crugnola	2019, 2024

Wins	Manufacturers
12	(United States) Ford
8	(Italy) Lancia
5	(France) Citroën
4	(Japan) Toyota
3	(Italy) Alfa Romeo
3	(Czech Republic) Škoda
2	(Germany) Porsche
2	(Germany) BMW
2	(Japan) Subaru

== See also ==
- Rallying in Italy
