= 1962 Italian Rally Championship =

Rallying series

The 1962 Italian Rally Championship is the 2nd season of the Italian Rally Championship.

== Calendar ==
A map showing the locations of the rallies in Italy for the 1962 Italian Rally Championship. Event headquarters are marked with blue dots.

Round	Start date	Finish date	Rally	Rally headquarters	Surface	Stages	Distance	Ref.
1	23 February	25 February	(Liguria) 2º Rallye dei Fiori	Sanremo, Liguria	Asphalt; Gravel			
2	29 April	29 April	(Tuscany) 5º Rallye della Provincia di Lucca	Lucca, Tuscany	Asphalt; Gravel			
