= 1961 Italian Rally Championship =

Rallying series

The 1961 Italian Rally Championship is the 1st season of the Italian Rally Championship.

== Calendar ==
A map showing the locations of the rallies in Italy for the 1961 Italian Rally Championship. Event headquarters are marked with blue dots.

Round	Start date	Finish date	Rally	Rally headquarters	Surface	Stages	Distance	Ref.
1	8 April	9 April	(Liguria) 21º Coppa Riviera di Ponente; Genova-Sanremo	Genoa, Liguria	Asphalt			
2	23 April	23 April	(Tuscany) 4º Rallye Automobilistico della Provincia di Lucca	Lucca, Tuscany	Asphalt; Gravel			
3	30 April	30 April	(Tuscany) 3º Rally Della Toscana	Florence, Tuscany	Asphalt; Gravel			
4	12 May	14 May	(Sardinia) 5º Rallye della Sardegna	Cagliari, Sardinia	Gravel			

== Entrants ==
The following manufacturers are set to contest the championship.

Manufacturer	Entrant	Car	Tires	Driver name	Co-driver name	Rounds
(Italy) Ferrari	(Italy) Scuderia Biondetti	Ferrari 250 GT		(Italy) Piero Frescobaldi		3
