= Ferrari 308 GTB/GTS =

Ferrari 308 GTB and GTS
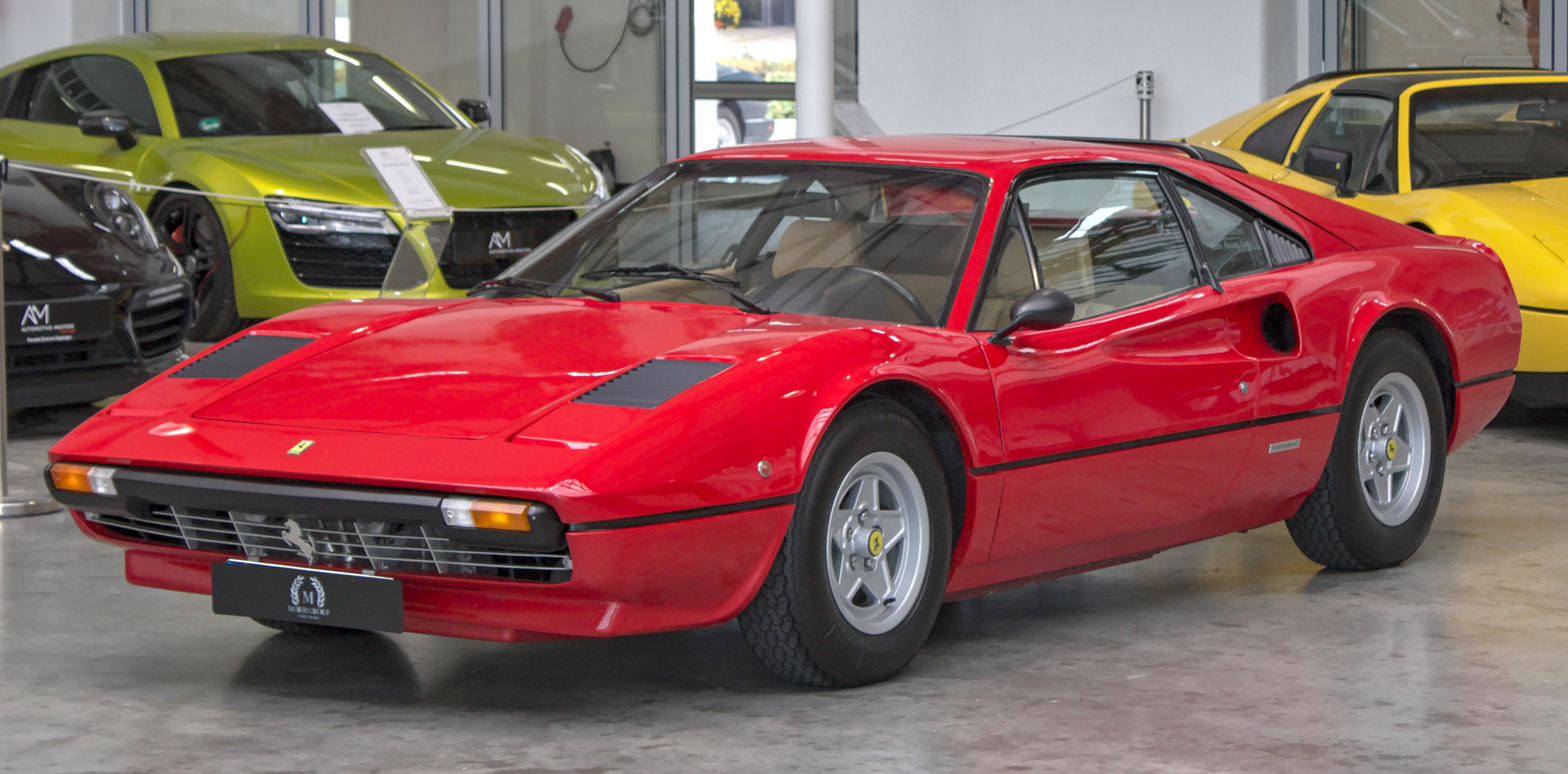

Overview
- Manufacturer: Ferrari
- Production: 1975–1985
- Assembly: Italy: Maranello
- Designer: Leonardo Fioravanti at Pininfarina

Body and chassis
- Class: Sports car (S)
- Body style: Berlinetta (GTB); Targa top (GTS)
- Layout: Transverse mid-engine, rear-wheel-drive
- Related: Ferrari 208/308 GT4; Ferrari Mondial; Ferrari 288 GTO

Dimensions
- Wheelbase: 2,340 mm (92.1 in)
- Length: 4,230 mm (166.5 in)
- Width: 1,720 mm (67.7 in)
- Height: 1,120 mm (44.1 in)

Chronology
- Predecessor: Dino 246 GT/GTS
- Successor: Ferrari 328 GTB/GTS

The Ferrari 308 GTB berlinetta and targa-topped 308 GTS are V8 mid-engined, two-seater sports cars manufactured by the Italian company Ferrari from 1975 until 1985. The 308 replaced the Dino 246 GT and GTS in 1975 and was updated as the 328 GTB/GTS in 1985. The similar 208 GTB and GTS were equipped with a smaller, initially naturally aspirated and later turbocharged, two-litre engine, and were sold mainly in Italy.

== Design ==
The 308 had a tube frame with a separate body. The 308 GTB/GTS and GT4 were mechanically similar, and also shared much with the original Dino. Both 308s sit on the same tube platform, however the GT4—being a 2+2—has a longer wheelbase. The engine was a flat-plane crankshaft V8 of a 90 degree configuration, with two belt-driven overhead camshafts per cylinder bank. It was transversely mounted in unit with the transaxle transmission assembly, which was below and to the rear of the engine's sump. All models used a fully synchromesh 5-speed "dog-leg" manual gearbox and a clutch-type limited-slip differential. Suspension was all-independent, comprising double wishbones, coaxial coil springs and hydraulic dampers, and anti-roll bars on both axles; four wheel vented disc brakes were also fitted. Steering was unassisted rack and pinion.

The 308's body was designed by Pininfarina's Leonardo Fioravanti, who had been responsible for some of Ferrari's most celebrated shapes to date such as the Daytona, the Dino and the Berlinetta Boxer. The 308 used elements of these shapes to create something very much in contrast with the angular Bertone-designed GT4. GTS models featured a removable roof panel with grained satin black finish, which could be stowed in a vinyl cover behind the seats when not in use.

== Model history ==
=== 308 GTB/GTS ===
Ferrari 308 GTB/GTS Ferrari 308 GTBi/GTSi
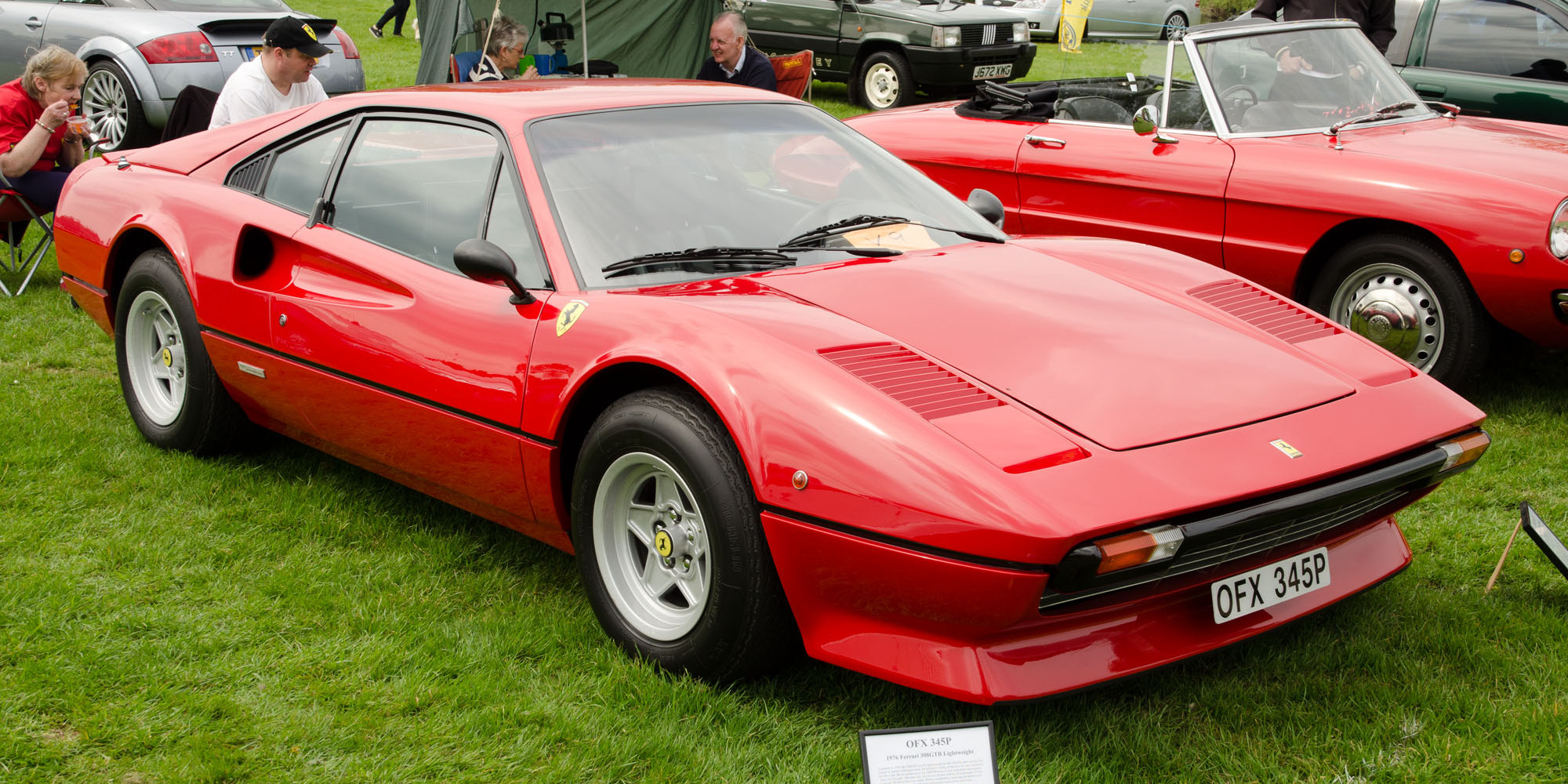
- 1976 Ferrari 308 GTB

Overview
- Production: 1975–1980 (GTB); 1977–1980 (GTS); 1980–1983 (GTBi/GTSi)

Powertrain
- Engine: 2.9 L Tipo F106 AB V8 (GTB/GTS); 2.9 L Tipo F106 BB V8 (GTBi/GTSi)
- Transmission: 5-speed manual

Dimensions
- Kerb weight: 1,090 kg (2,403 lb) (GTB); 1,286 kg (2,835 lb) (GTBi)

The Pininfarina-styled Ferrari 308 GTB was introduced at the Paris Motor Show in 1975 as a supplement to the Bertone-shaped 2+2 Dino 308 GT4 and a direct replacement for the two-seater Dino 246.

Its F106 AB V8 engine was equipped with four twin-choke Weber 40DCNF carburettors and single coil ignition. European versions produced 255 PS (188 kW; 252 bhp) at 6600 rpm (7700 rpm redline), but American versions were down to 240 PS (177 kW; 237 bhp) at 6,600 rpm due to emissions control devices. European specification cars used dry sump lubrication. Cars destined to the Australian, Japanese and US market were fitted with a conventional wet sump engine from the GT4.

A notable aspect of the early 308 GTB was that, although still built by Carrozzeria Scaglietti, its bodywork was originally entirely made of glass-reinforced plastic (GRP), allowing a very light weight of 1,050 kg (2,315 lb). This lasted until June 1977, when the 308 was switched to steel bodies, resulting in an overall weight increase of approximately 150 kg (331 lb).

Five-spoke 14-inch alloy wheels were standard, while 16-inch wheels were made available later as an option together with sports exhaust system, high compression Borgo pistons, a high lift camshaft P6 and a deeper front spoiler, this option was called "Sprintpack".

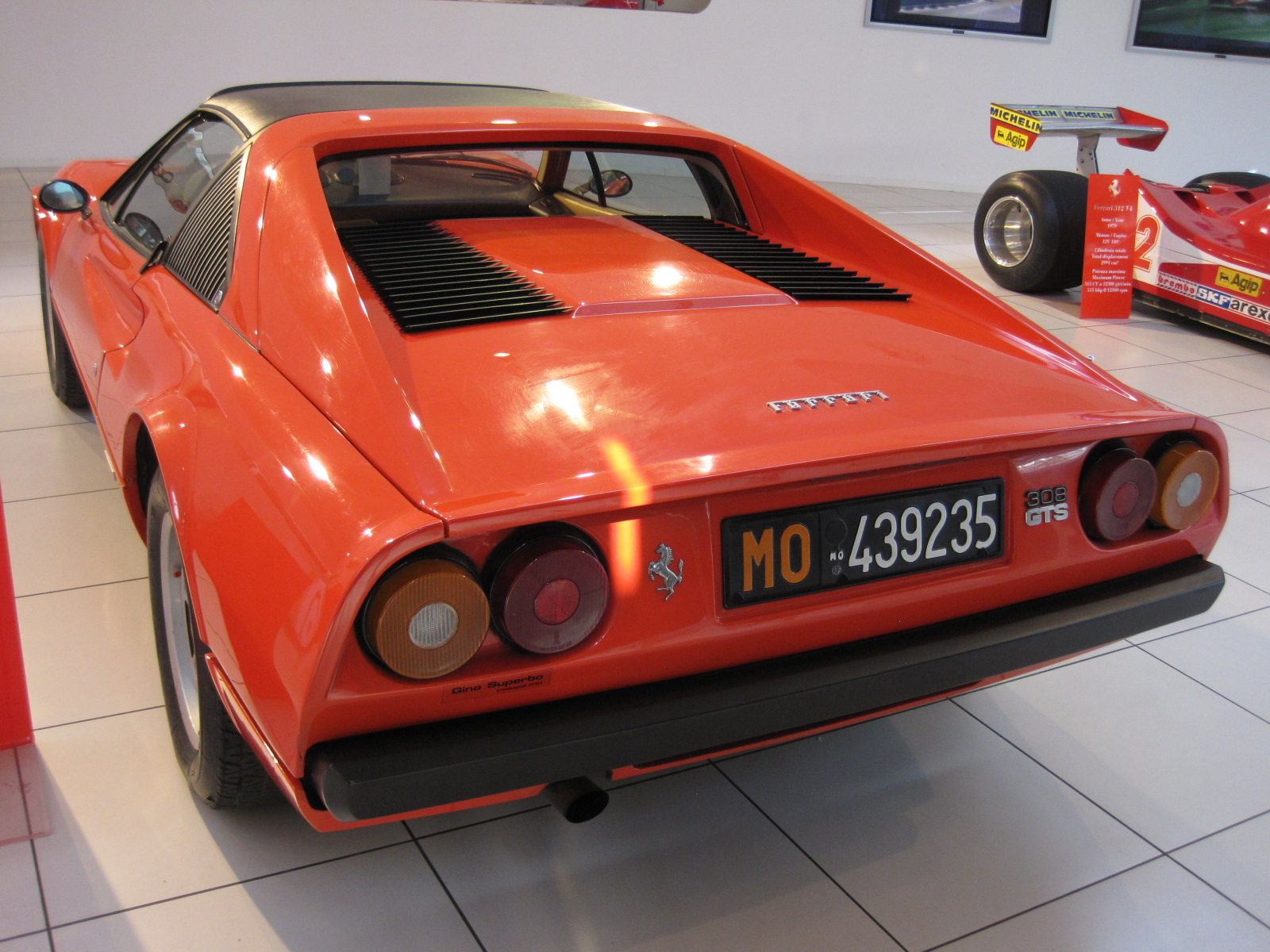
Tail of an early single-exhaust GTS

At the 1977 Frankfurt Motor Show, the targa topped 308 GTS was introduced. All GTSs received a wet-sump engine and were steel-bodied. European-market GTB models retained the dry sump lubrication until 1981.

There were 3,219 GTSs and 2,897 GTBs made from 1975 to 1980. Only 808 of the fibreglass (vetroresina in Italian) version were made, all with the Berlinetta bodywork.

=== 308 GTBi/GTSi ===
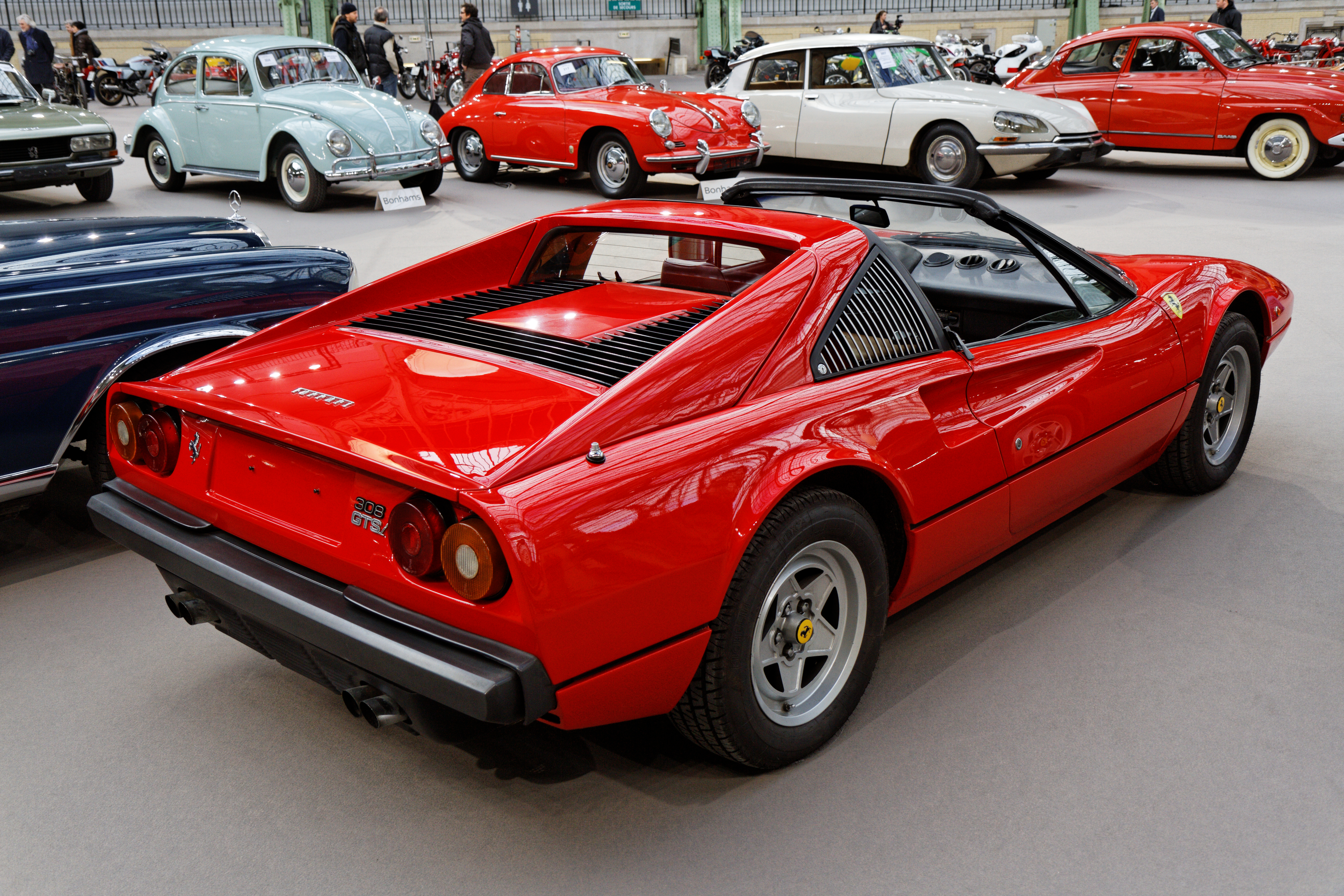
1981 308 GTSi, rear view

In 1980 Bosch K-Jetronic mechanical fuel injection was introduced, bringing with it a name change to 308 GTBi and GTSi. The fuel injection system decreased the amount of pollutants but at the cost of performance, with maximum power dropping to 214 PS (157 kW; 211 bhp) on European models and 205 PS (151 kW; 202 bhp) on US models. The fuel injection was coupled to a Marelli MED 803A Digiplex electronic ignition, incorporating a coil, distributor, and ignition module for each bank of cylinders.

Outside, the car was identical to the 308 GTB/GTS, save for metric sized wheels of a slightly different design, fitted with Michelin TRX radial tyres—Michelin XWX on 16-inch wheels were optional. Inside, the clock and oil temperature gauge were moved to the centre console; there were also a new black steering wheel with three perforated spokes, and seats of a different pattern.

494 GTBis and 1743 GTSis were produced before the model was succeeded by the 308 Quattrovalvole in 1982.

=== 308 GTB/GTS Quattrovalvole ===
Ferrari 308 Quattrovalvole
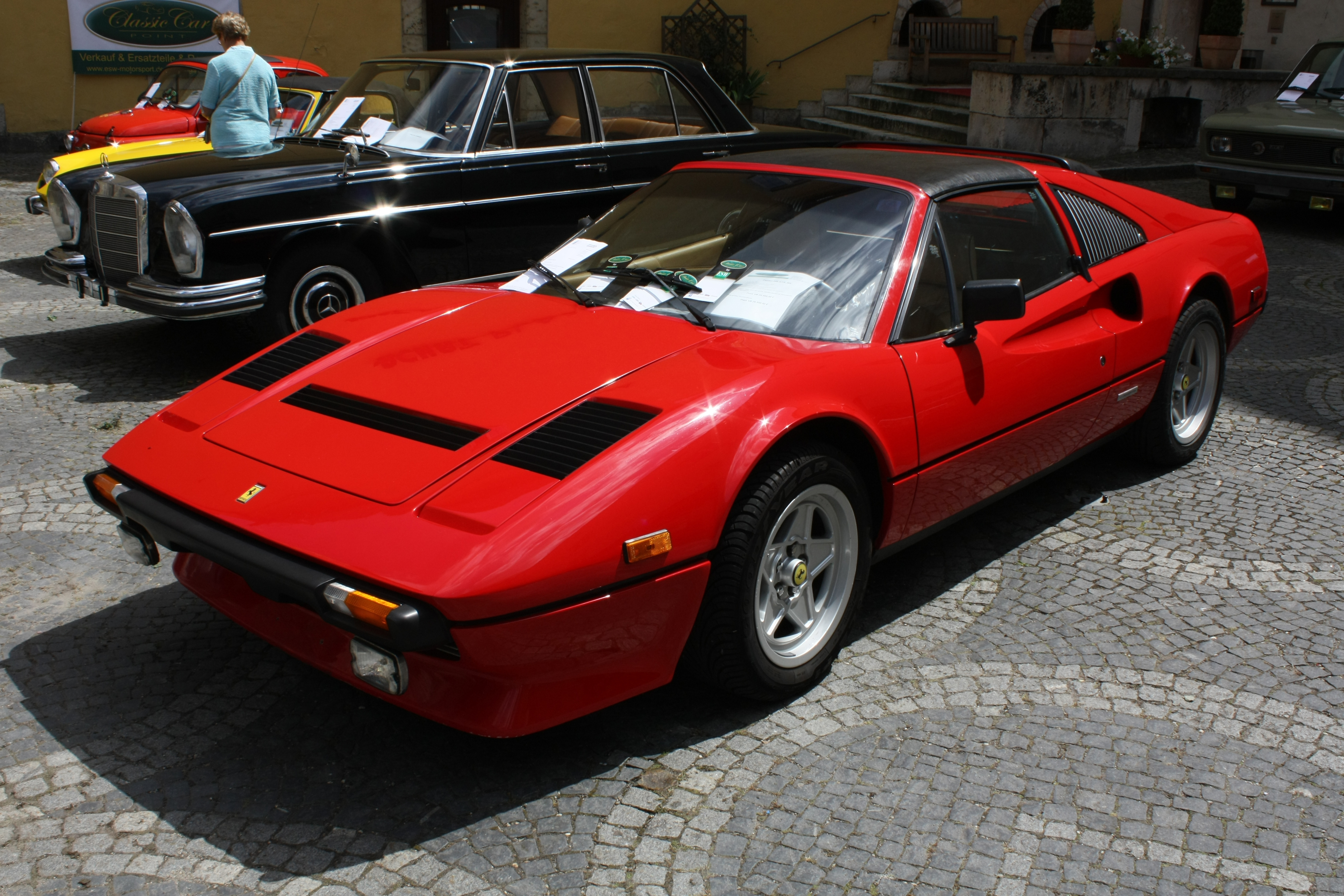

Overview
- Production: 1982–1985

Powertrain
- Engine: 2.9 L (2,927 cc) Tipo F105 AB V8
- Transmission: 5-speed manual

Dimensions
- Kerb weight: 1,465 kg (3,230 lb) (GTS QV)

Two years later, at the 1982 Paris Motor Show, Ferrari launched the 308 quattrovalvole, in GTB and GTS form. The main change from the 308 GTBi/GTSi it succeeded were the four valves per cylinder—hence its name, quattrovalvole, literally "four valves" in Italian—which pushed output back up to 240 hp (177 kW) restoring some of the performance lost to the emission control equipment.

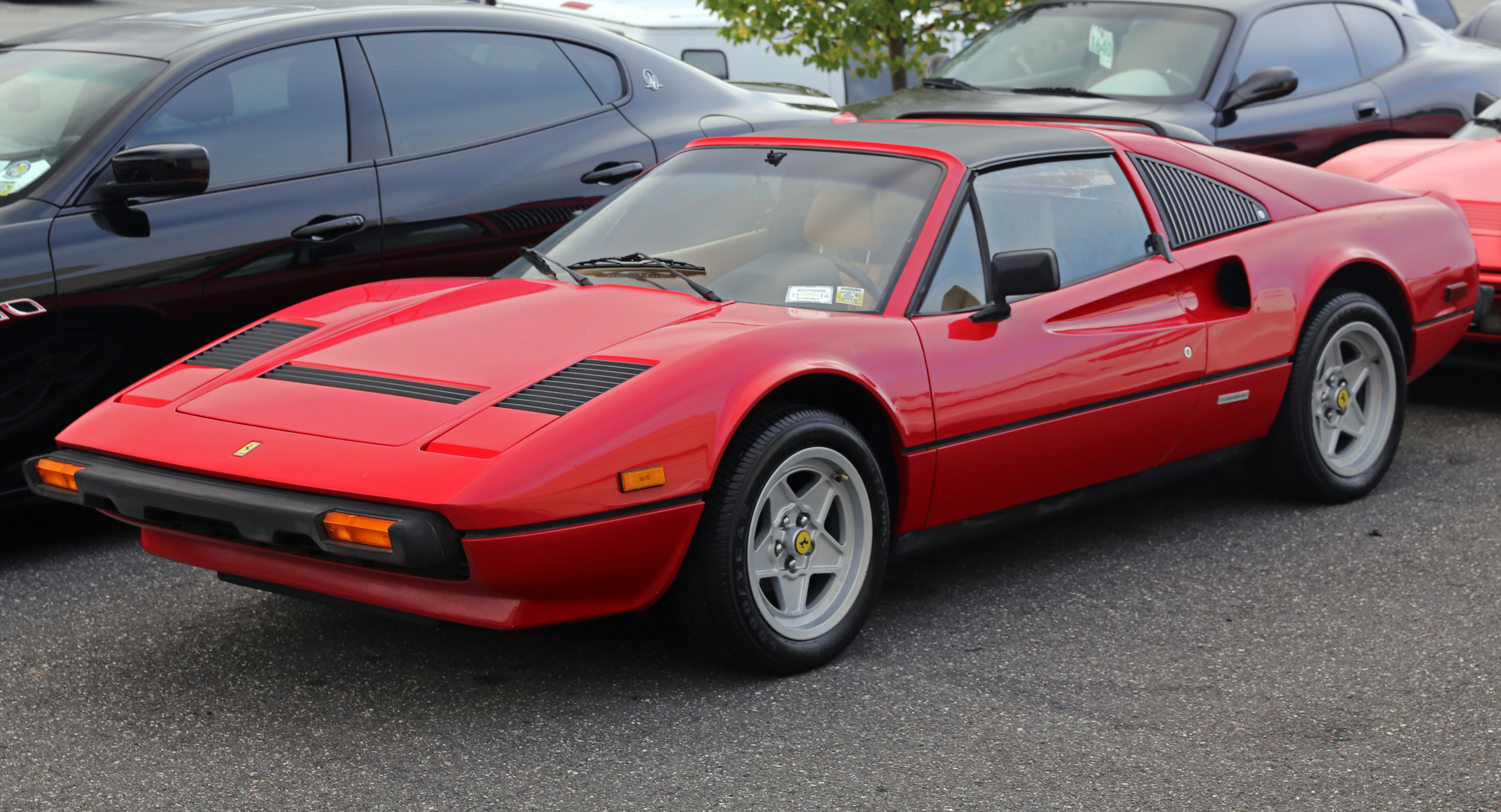
Federalized 1985 Ferrari 308 GTS Quattrovalvole

The new model could be recognized by the addition of a slim louvred panel in the front lid to aid radiator exhaust air exit, power operated mirrors carrying a small enamel Ferrari badge, a redesigned radiator grille with rectangular driving lights on each side, and rectangular (in place of round) side repeaters. The interior also received some minor updates, such as a satin black three spoke steering wheel with triangular centre; cloth seat centres became available as an option to the standard full leather. Available options included metallic paint, a deep front spoiler, air conditioning, wider, 16-inch Speedline wheels with Pirelli P7 tyres, and a satin black roof aerofoil (standard on Japanese market models).

Apart from the DOHC 32-valve cylinder heads, the V8 engine was essentially of the same design as that used in the 308 GTSi model. Total displacement was 2,927 cc (2.9 L; 178.6 cu in), with a bore x stroke of 81 mm × 71 mm (3.19 in × 2.80 in). Output on European specification cars was 240 hp (177 kW) at 7000 rpm and 260 N⋅m (192 lb⋅ft) at 5000 rpm of torque, while for US specification variants were 230 hp (172 kW) SAE net at 6800 rpm and 255 N⋅m (188 lb⋅ft) of torque at 5500 rpm. The gear and final drive ratios were altered to suit the revised characteristics of the four valves per cylinder engine. One other significant benefit of the QV's four valve heads was the replacement of the non-QV models sodium valves which have been known to fail at the joint between the head and the stem. Bosch K-Jetronic fuel injection and Magneti Marelli Digiplex electronic ignition were carried over from the GTBi/GTSi. All US market examples were fitted with catalytic converters.

The 288 GTO introduced in 1984 is considered as the first Ferrari supercar. The 288 borrowed much of the styling from the European 308 GTB QV of the previous year, 1983: it is also powered by a similar 2.8-litre V8 with a smaller bore and twin turbochargers, it retained the general bodywork lines with extended wheelarches, different side air vents, and bigger rear spoiler, longer (5 in (127 mm)) wheelbase, and the central tubular space frame chassis.

In 1985 Ferrari launched the 328, which replaced the Quattrovalvole. Between 1982 and 1985 the quattrovalvole was produced in a total of 3042 GTS and only 748 GTB examples.

=== 208 GTB/GTS ===
Ferrari 208 GTB Ferrari 208 GTS
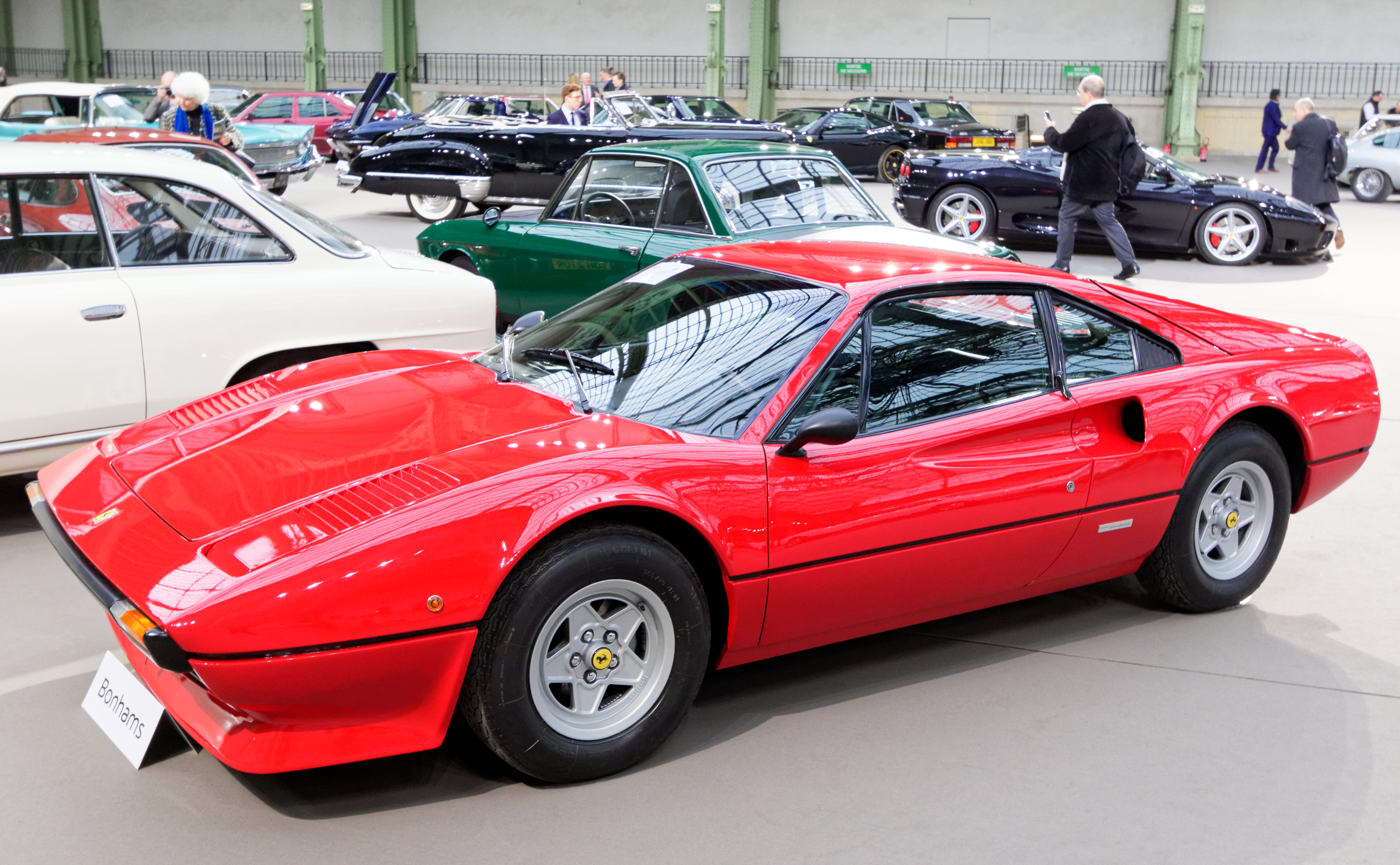
- 1981 Ferrari 208 GTB

Overview
- Production: 1980–1981

Powertrain
- Engine: 2.0 L Tipo F106 CB 000 V8

In 1980 Ferrari introduced a two-litre version of the 308, 208 GTB and 208 GTS. They were mainly for the domestic Italian market, where new cars with engines above 2 litres were subjected to a much higher value added tax, 38% instead of the standard 18%. The 208 was also listed in Portugal and New Zealand. The 208 GTB/GTS replaced the 208 GT4 2+2. It is often regarded as the slowest Ferrari ever made but proved faster than the 208 GT4 Bertone in a 1980 test by American magazine Motor Trend.

The engine was de-bored to 66.8 mm (giving it an undersquare design) for a total displacement of 1,990.64 cc (121 cu in), resulting in one of the smallest V8 engines ever produced. Fed through four Weber 34 DCNF carburetors, the V8 produced 155 hp (114 kW) at 6800 rpm. 160 208 GTS and 140 208 GTB cars were produced in 1980 and 1981.

=== 208 GTB/GTS Turbo ===
Ferrari 208 GTB Turbo Ferrari 208 GTS Turbo
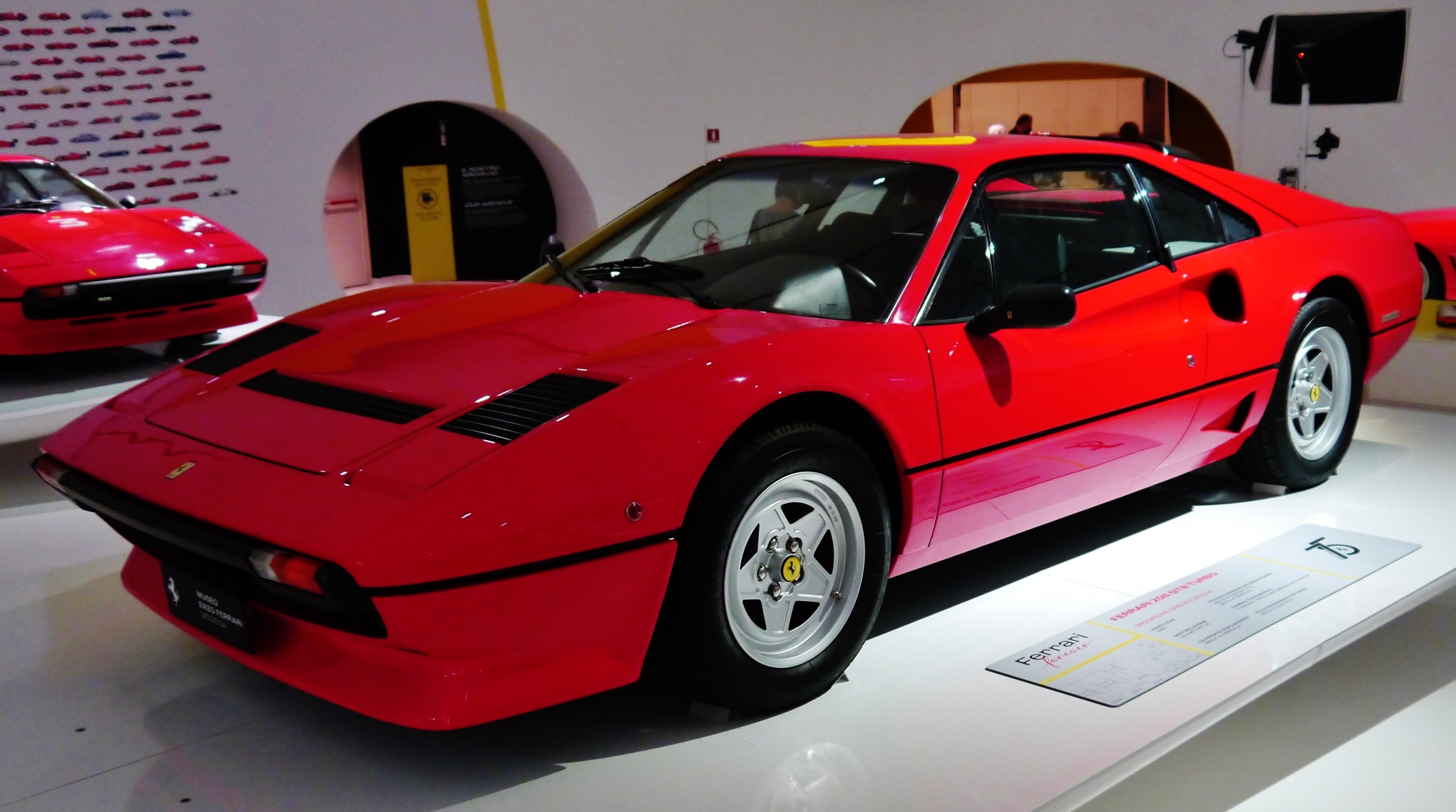

Overview
- Production: 1982–1985

Powertrain
- Engine: 2.0 L Tipo F106 D 000 turbocharged V8

Chronology
- Successor: Ferrari GTB/GTS Turbo

In 1982 the two-litre 208 was succeeded by a turbocharged and fuel injected version, the 208 GTB Turbo unveiled at the Turin Motor Show. It was the first ever turbocharged road-going Ferrari. A GTS version was introduced a year later, in 1983. Like the original 208, this model was intended for the Italian domestic market.

The 208's engine was given a single KKK K26 turbocharger with wastegate valve, Bosch K-Jetronic fuel injection and Marelli electronic ignition. The turbocharging system's design was heavily influenced by the contemporary Ferrari 126C2 Formula One car. Forced induction increased power to 220 hp (162 kW) at 7000 rpm, while torque output increased by 18 percent. The 208 Turbo was claimed to accelerate from 0-60 mph (97 km/h) in 6.6 seconds, with a top speed of 150 mph (241 km/h).

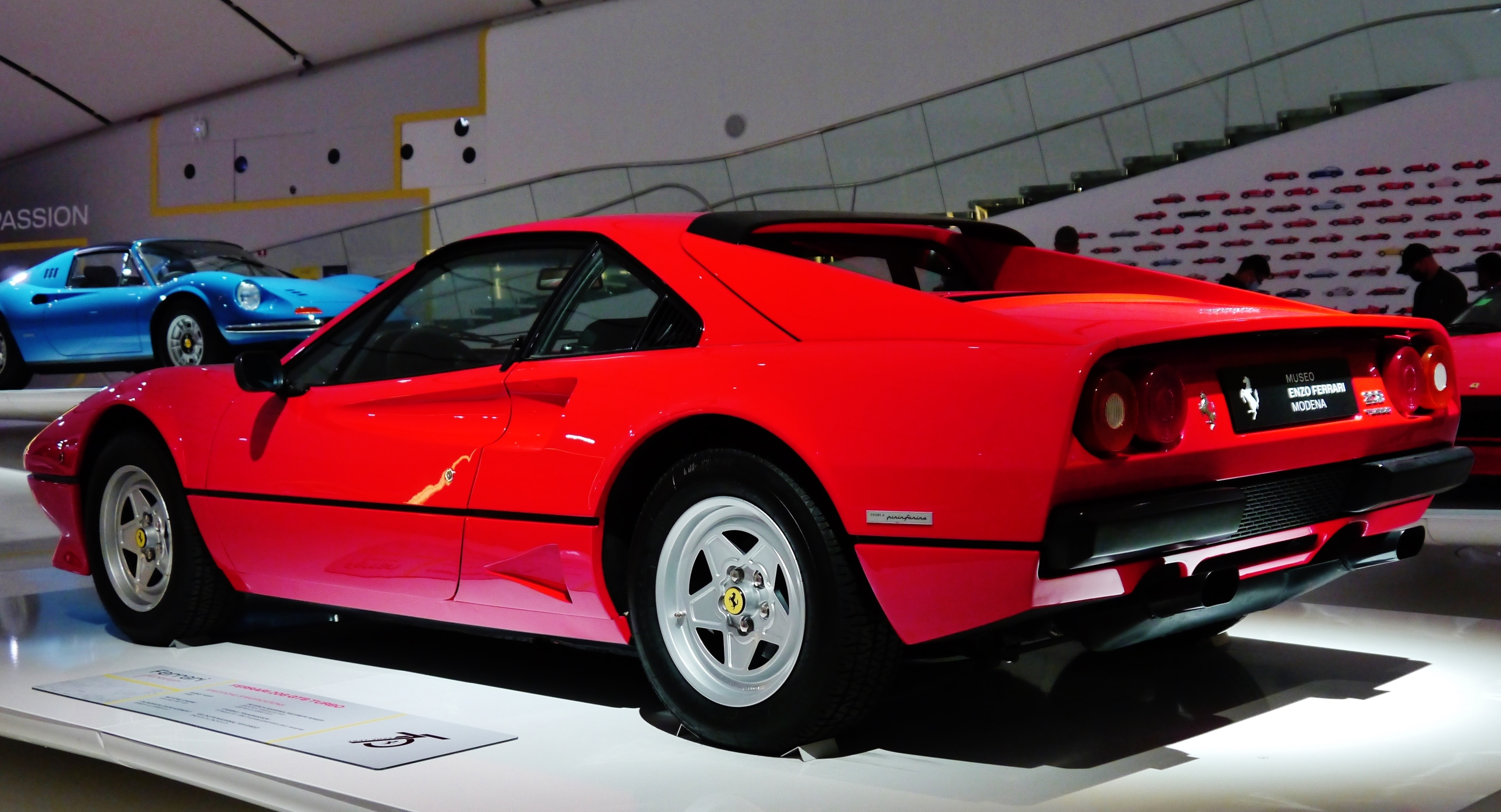
208 GTB Turbo, rear view

Both outside and inside, the 208 Turbo was almost identical to the contemporary 308 Quattrovalvole. It could be recognized by NACA ducts in front of the rear wheel well openings and "turbo" badging on the tail and shrouded exhaust pipes. Extra cooling slots were also added to the lower front spoiler, below the radiator grille. In the rear of the car, additional louvers were added to the engine cover and a cooling vent was placed in the center of the rear bumper, splitting it in two. The deep front spoiler and black roof aileron, optional on the 308, were standard equipment on the 208 Turbo.

Production ended in 1985 after 437 GTB Turbo and 250 GTS Turbo cars were produced. In 1986 they were replaced by the 328-based, intercooled GTB/GTS Turbo.

== In popular culture ==
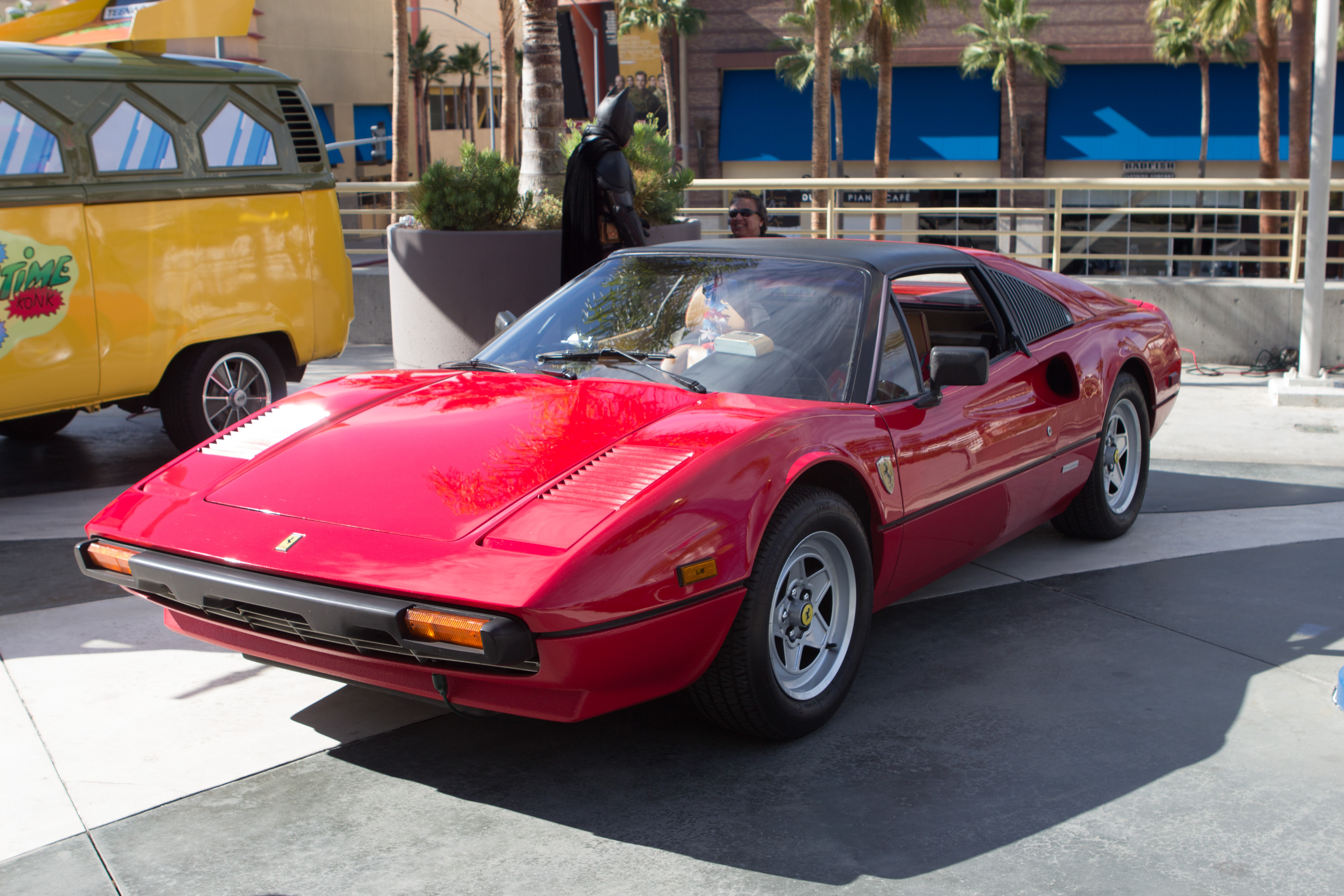
Ferrari 308 GTSi from Magnum, P.I.

The 308 was made famous by the television series Magnum, P.I. in which the series' lead, Thomas Magnum (Tom Selleck) drove the car around Oahu for eight seasons while on his investigations, from 1980 to 1988. Several 308 GTS cars were used, a new one for each season, most being auctioned off after filming and all with the license plate "ROBIN 1".

- Season 1 – 1979 308GTS
- Seasons 2–6 – 1981 308GTSi
- Seasons 7–8 – 1984 308GTSi quattrovalvole

== Awards ==
In 2004, Sports Car International named this car number five on the list of Top Sports Cars of the 1970s.

== US Model ==
The 308 for the US market has several differences and changes as to comply with the FMVSS safety regulations and EPA exhaust regulations.

Externally, the 308 has larger and beefier front and rear bumpers that jut out by a few inches and rectangular side running lamps and retroreflective markers on the side (amber in front and red in rear). The tiny round side turn signal repeaters are not fitted to the US model while the front parking lamp/side lamps are in amber colour, matching the front turn signal indicators. Internally, the bumpers have shock absorbers as to comply with 5-mph collision without damage, and the doors have the side impact bars welded to the frames. Different external rear view mirror with more rectangular "flagpole" housing are used on the US model for better rear view. The headlamps have been replaced with sealed beam headlamps. The "flash-to-pass" feature is visible through the cooling grille on European model but not US model.

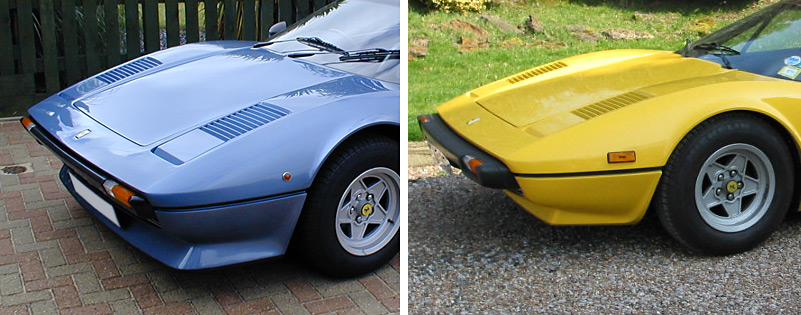
A 1979 Euro spec GTS (left) and a 1977 US spec GTB (right)

The engine has a reduced compression ratio from 9.2:1 to 8.6:1, resulting in lower performance (233 bhp versus 240 bhp for QV model) along with different gear ratios for the gearbox. The US model requires the lead-free petrol and catalyst converter while most of European and international models don't. The use of catalyst converter led to cosmetic changes to the engine bay cover for additional cooling (U-shaped vent instead of two separate stripes of vents) and silencer cover in black colour instead of silver.

The instrument cluster has "Fasten Seat Belt" warning light that isn't found on European or some international markets. From 1979 to 1981, the speedometer has a long reddish-orange arc extending below 80 marker instead of showing 100 to 180 markers. A smaller "55" inside a circle is inserted between 50 and 60 . This saves Ferrari the hassle of recalibrating the gears and redesigning the face for 85-mph speed limit. Ferrari has reverted to 180-mph speedometer after the regulation was repealed.

Due to the higher performance, "free-flow" exhaust system, and lighter weight, some Americans imported the European models and modified them to a varying degree, sometimes committing fraud (providing photos of US market examples to prove that the compliance work had been done) to gain compliance. Some of grey importers replaced the amber turn signal indicators with red brake lamps on the outer parts of the taillamps and affixed the retroreflective markers to the side as to "comply" with the FMVSS regulations.

== 308 GTB Millechiodi ==
The 308 GTB Millechiodi was an aerodynamic study based on the 308 GTB and designed by Pininfarina. It was first shown at the 1977 Geneva Motor Show. Differences from the standard 308 GTB include a custom, unpainted aerodynamic body kit and the instrument panel from the Berlinetta Boxer. Some of its styling elements would later show up in the Ferrari 288 GTO.

== Rally versions ==
From 1978 through 1986, rally racing versions of the Ferrari 308 GTB were developed and produced in small numbers by Michelotto, a Padua-based Ferrari dealer and race-preparation workshop. Michelotto was owned and operated by Giuliano Michelotto, not to be confused with Italian automotive designer Giovanni Michelotti. Although Michelotto was organizationally independent from Ferrari, the cars were developed in close collaboration with Ferrari factory engineers. The Michelotto workshop built rally versions of the 308 GTB to compete in Group 4 and Group B classes of the World Rally Championship. This production included cars based on modified production chassis and engines as well as the more radical, purpose-built 308 GT/M. These cars were raced with some success from the late 1970s through the mid-1980s, but development and officially sanctioned competition use of the type ceased in 1986 with the cancellation of the Group B class.

=== Group 4 ===
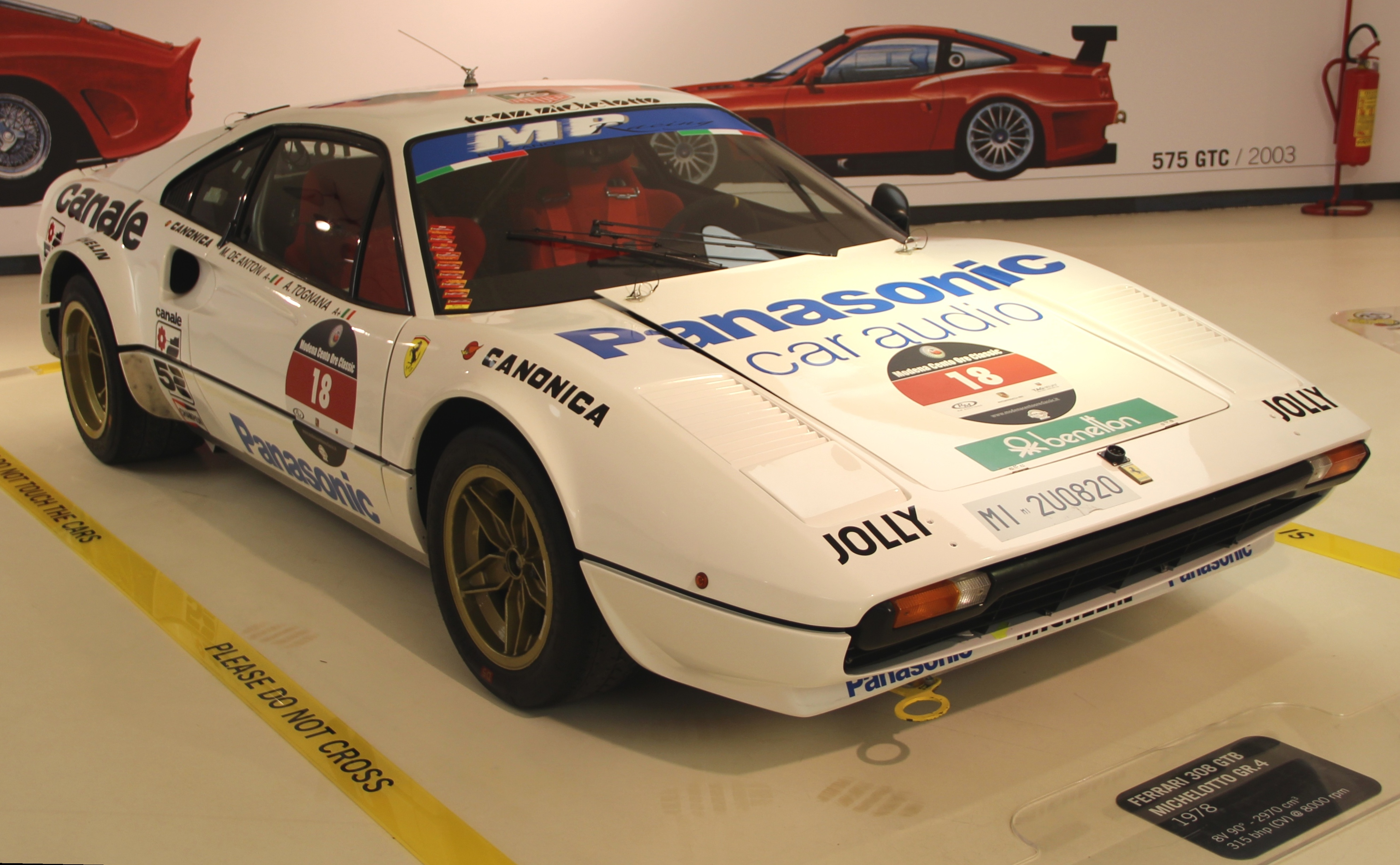
308 GTB Gr.4 by Michelotto, on display at the Museo Ferrari

Michelotto began constructing Group 4-specification 308 GTB rally cars in 1978. In 1980, Michelotto provided a Gr.4 308 to Padova-based rally driver "Nico" Grosoli. Grosoli provided funding for Michelotto's efforts and was able to bring in more assistance from the Ferrari factory. At the time, Lancia was the Fiat Group's official entrant into the World Rally Championship. Although Ferrari was also a member of the Fiat Group, which ostensibly coordinated competition activities between member brands, Michelotto (with Grosoli's assistance) was able to obtain official support from the Ferrari factory.

Ferrari supplied bare 308 GTB chassis and engines which Michelotto built into complete rally racing cars. Michelotto installed lightweight tubular framed chassis sections made of steel and titanium, including a roll cage and a modified engine bay designed to allow easier maintenance access. They were equipped with 2-valve-per-cylinder (i.e. early type non-Quattrovalvole) engines using high-compression pistons, revised valves, cams, bearings, and spark plugs. Bosch Kugelfischer mechanical fuel injection was used instead of the Weber carburetors or Bosch K-Jetronic injection systems seen on roadgoing 308 models. Two additional oil coolers were added at the front of the car. After modifications by Michelotto, this engine produced approximately 288-330 bhp. A close-ratio transmission with no synchromesh was fitted to improve acceleration. The suspension used standard 308 components with adjustable Koni shock absorbers. The suspension was tuned for the varied surfaces found in rally stages and had a visibly higher ride height than 308 road cars. Brakes were standard 308 equipment with an added brake balance controller. Wider wheels by Campagnolo or Ruote Neri were fitted. The bodywork was constructed from fiberglass and Kevlar and was equipped with larger fender flares and optional lights for night stages. In order to save weight, the interior was stripped, Sparco fiberglass racing seats installed and the motorized hidden headlight mechanisms were replaced with manually operated mechanisms. Michelotto built a total of 11 Gr.4-specification 308 rally cars.

Group 4 308s competed in rallies from 1978 through at least 1983. During 1978–79, a Michelotto-prepared Gr.4 308 was campaigned in several rallies by Roberto Liviero and Rafaele "Lele" Pinto, winning the 1979 Rally di Monza. Later in 1980, one of the Gr.4 cars was driven by "Nico" Grosoli in multiple rallies, including the Costa Smeralda Rally, Rally il Ciocco, Rally di Piancavallo and the Targa Florio Rally. French driver Jean-Claude Andruet witnessed the 308 competing at the Targa Florio and convinced Charles Pozzi's team to run a team of Gr.4 308s during 1981. Four Gr.4 308s were built by Michelotto for Pozzi. While the Pozzi team did not attempt to compete in all the World Rally Championship races, they were successful in the limited number of tarmac and light gravel rallies they entered. The Pozzi team declined to enter those events that involved forest roads and/or snow, as they did not feel the 308 would be competitive on such terrain. In 1981, Andruet and co-drivers Chantal Bouchetal and Michèle Espinos-Petit, racing under her nom de course of "Biche", won the Targa Florio Rally, the Rally 4 Regioni, the 24 Ore de Ypres, and the Tour de France Automobile. They temporarily held the lead in but did not win the Tour de Corse, the Rally Costa Brava, Hunsrück Rallye and the Rali Vinho da Madeira. A second Pozzi Gr.4 308 was driven by Guy Chasseuil with co-driver Bernadette Chasseuil, who did not score any wins but placed second several times. The Pozzi team continued to run the 308s in 1982, including a second-place overall finish for Andruet/Petit in the Tour de Corse, the best ever result for the 308 in an official calendar WRC event. Also in 1982, an independent team consisting of Italians Tonino Tognana and Massimo de Antoni driving a Gr.4 308 won the Rally il Ciocco and the Rally di Piancavallo and placed second at the Colline di Romagna. In 1983, an independent driver competing under the pseudonym "Panic" raced an ex-Pozzi Gr.4 308 in the Tour de France and Tour de Corse, finishing both among the top ranked non-works entries.

=== Group B ===
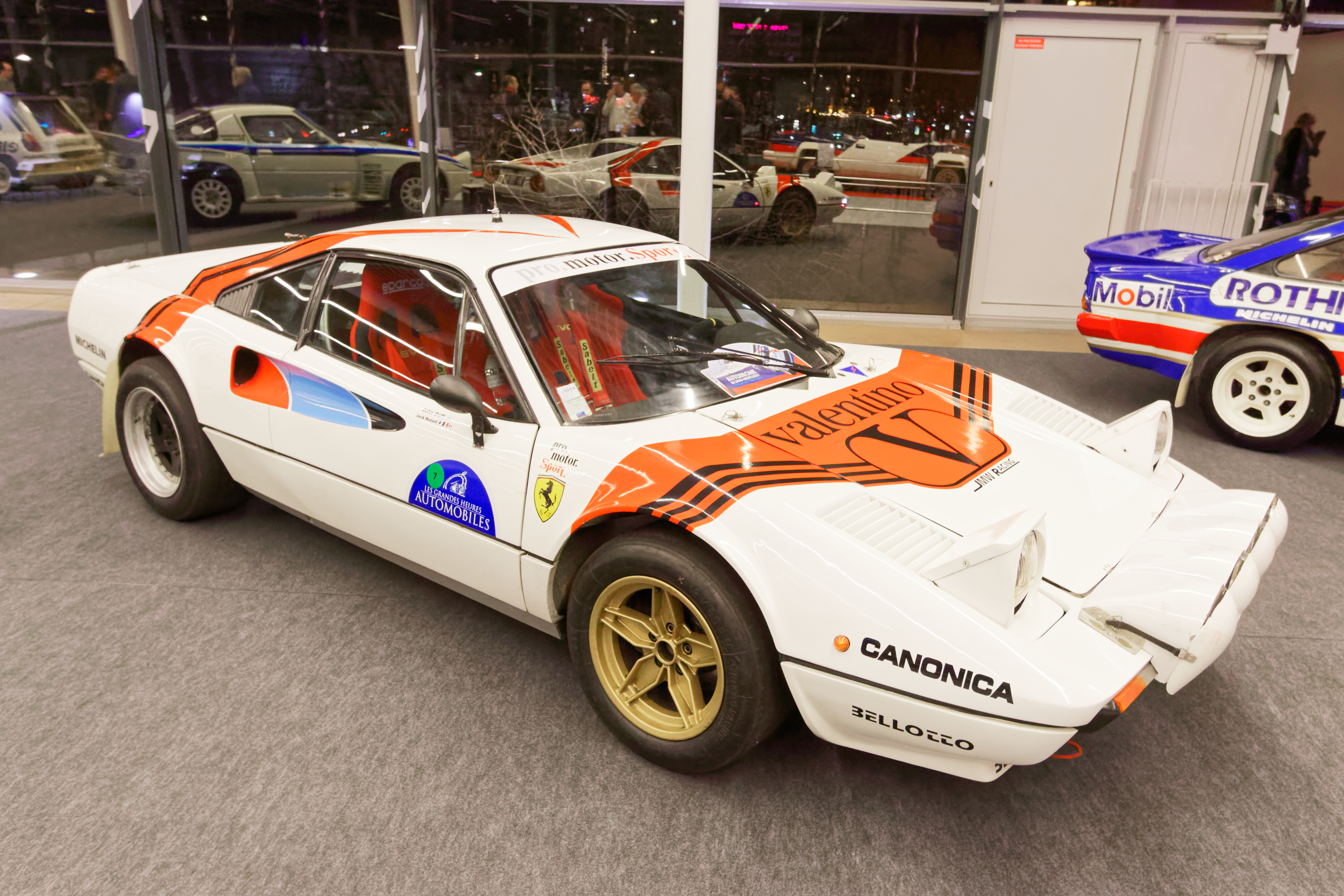
308 GTB Gr.B by Michelotto, on display at Rétromobile 2017

Following the introduction of Group B rules in 1982, Michelotto began building 308 GTB rally cars to compete in that class. The first Gr.B 308 was built at the request of Spanish rally driver Antonio Zanini. Four Gr.B specification cars were built, with certain engine and bodywork details differing from the earlier Gr.4 cars. The first Gr.B 308, chassis 18869, was constructed with a 2-valve engine like the Gr.4 cars, while the 3 later cars used a 4-valve-per-cylinder engine and Bosch K-Jetronic fuel injection from the 308 Quattrovalvole. The QV motor produced 310 hp at 8,000 rpm after tuning by Michelotto. The Gr.B cars were also equipped with a "quick-change" gearbox that allowed the final drive ratio to be replaced quickly and easily during racing or testing. Additional modifications included upgraded Brembo brakes, Fondmetal Canonica wheels, stronger anti-roll bars, rose-joint suspension links, lighter suspension wishbones and a quicker-ratio steering rack.

As initial homologation rules required that Gr.B cars use the same body panels as their roadgoing counterparts, the Gr.B 308s were equipped with steel and fiberglass panels. This increased total weight by 66 pounds (30 kg) over the earlier Gr.4 cars. The 308 was homologated under Group B rules three separate times in October 1982, January 1983 and April 1983. This allowed Michelotto to incorporate additional Ferrari-made performance parts into their Gr.B cars, including engine parts, lightweight windows and body panels.

In 1983, chassis 18869 was driven to first-place finishes at several rallies, including the Imperia Rally and the Sicilian Rally Championship. In 1985, Antonio Zanini drove this car to a third-place finish at the Targa Florio, followed by several other wins which led to his victory in the Spanish Rally Championship. At the 1984 Rally Della Lana, Luigi "Lucky" Battistolli and Claudio Berro drove chassis 18847 to a second-place finish. Also in 1984, the same car was driven to a third-place finish at the Rally di Monza by Björn Waldegård and co-driver Claes Billstam.

=== 308 GT/M ===
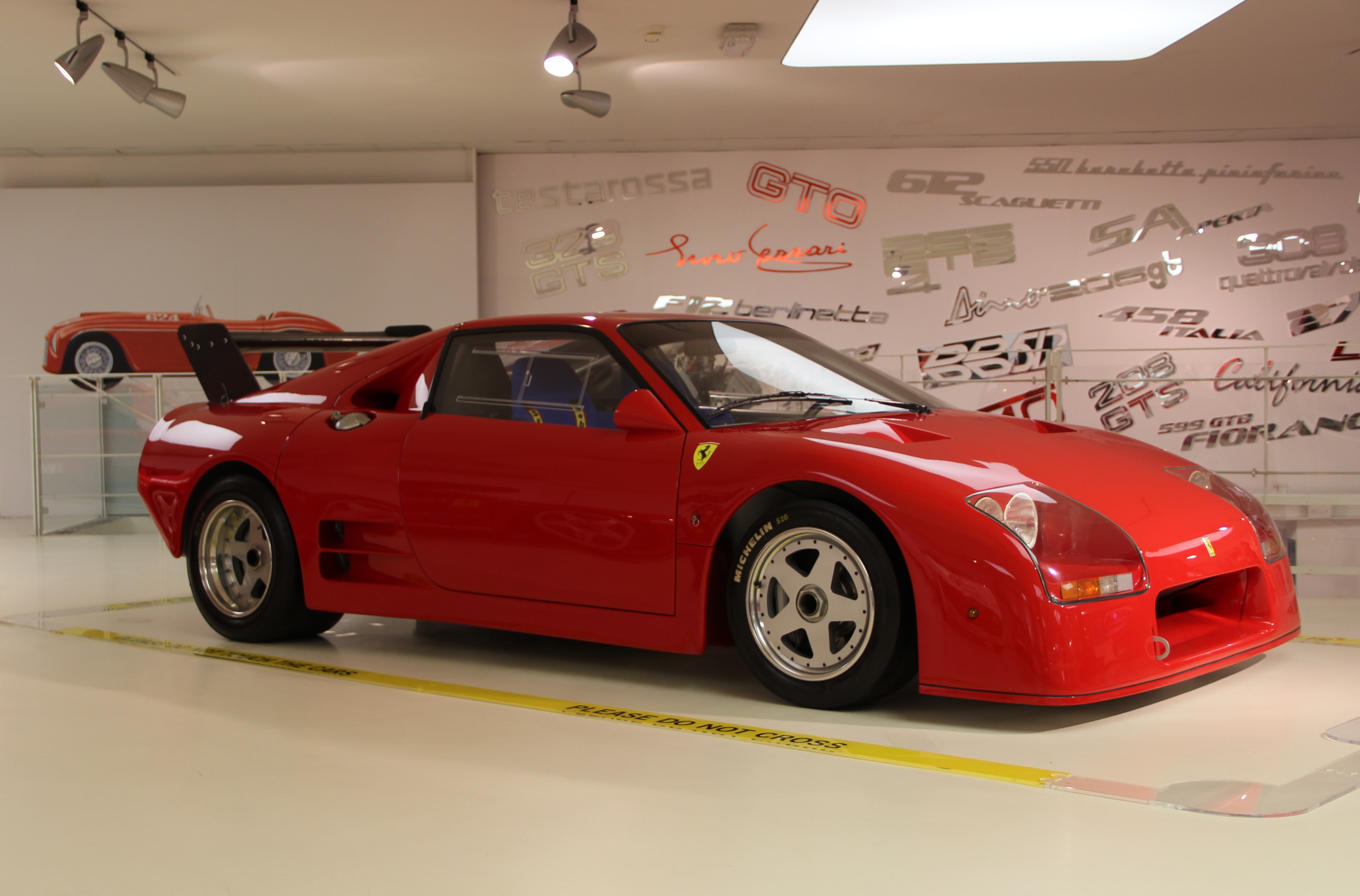
308 GT/M on display at the Museo Ferrari

The Ferrari 308 GT/M was developed by Ferrari and Michelotto to compete under the Group B "Evolution/Termination" rules. Development began in November 1982 as the successes of the Gr.4 308 convinced Ferrari and Michelotto that a purpose-built Ferrari rally car could be competitive under Group B rules. The model was cancelled with the banning of Group B cars for the 1987 season.

The 308 GT/M was built on a newly designed tubular frame steel chassis and a 3.0 liter 308 Quattrovalvole engine. This engine was mounted longitudinally in a rear-mid-engine position, in contrast to the transverse mounting of the 308 road cars and the earlier Gr.4 rally cars. The engine was upgraded internally and used an equal-length exhaust system and modified Bosch Kugelfischer fuel injection. This engine produced approximately 363-370 bhp at 8900 rpm. Upgraded pistons, valves and camshafts were used and both the camshaft and belt covers were cast in lightweight magnesium alloy. A Hewland 5-speed manual transaxle was mounted at the rear and supplied power to the rear wheels only. The car was also fitted with a dual-plate, Formula-One type Borg & Beck clutch. Double wishbone suspension and coil springs were used at all four wheels, with suspension geometry based on the Ferrari Mondial. Some standard 308 and Mondial components were incorporated, although many were modified. The suspension arms and steering rack both had two alternative mounting positions to allow ride height adjustments. Brembo brakes were fitted, including a hydraulically operated handbrake. The Kevlar and carbon fiber body of the car was designed by Francesco Boniolo. It resembled the earlier Ferrari 512 BB/LM and was influenced by wind tunnel testing of that model. It incorporated large, fixed headlights and a prominent rear spoiler. The body was constructed by Carrozzeria Auto Sport near Modena. Total weight of the car was 840 kilograms (1,850 lb), 120 kg less than the minimum weight mandated by Group B rules.

Ferrari drivers extensively tested the 308 GT/M at Fiorano from 1984 to 1986. With racing tyres fitted, the 308 GT/M lapped Fiorano in 1 minute, 24.6 seconds, faster than both the F40 (1:25) and 512 BB/LM (1:26.6). The car accelerated from 0-100 kilometres per hour (62 mph) in less than 4 seconds. Ferrari designed the car to reach a top speed of 270 kilometres per hour (170 mph) at a 8500 rpm redline in 5th gear.

Three 308 GT/M chassis were constructed, numbered 001, 002 and 003. Chassis 001 was completed in 1984 and subsequently used as a test mule by Ferrari to develop the design, including extensive track testing at Fiorano Circuit. By June 1984, it was sold to Belgian driver Jean "Beurlys" Blaton. Blaton raced the car occasionally in local Belgian rallies. Chassis 002 was entered in the 1984 Rally di Monza, where it was driven by Raffaele "Lele" Pinto. Under wet conditions, Pinto damaged the rear suspension and finished 4th, trailing a "conventional" Gr.B 308 GTB. 002 was repaired and subsequently used as a road car by a private owner. Chassis 003 was built for a Dutch driver, Henk Koel. Construction of 003 began in autumn of 1986 and was completed in April 1987. Chassis 003 was never used in rally racing, but has appeared at multiple Ferrari track events.
