= Franco Cunico =

Italian rally driver (born 1957)

Personal information
- Nationality: (Italy) Italian
- Born: October 11, 1957 (age 69); Vicenza

World Rally Championship record
- Years active: 1981 – 2000
- Co-driver: (Italy) Eraldo Mussa (Italy) Maurizio Perissinot (Italy) Massimo Sghedoni (Italy) Stefano Evangelisti (United Kingdom) Terry Harryman (Italy) Pierangelo Scalvini (Italy) Luigi Pirollo
- Rallies: 20
- Championships: 0
- Rally wins: 1
- Podiums: 2
- Stage wins: 15
- Total points: 48
- First rally: 1981 Rallye Sanremo
- First win: 1993 Rallye Sanremo

Gianfranco Cunico (born 11 October 1957 in Vicenza) is an Italian rally driver who won the 1993 Rallye Sanremo.

== Career ==
Cunico scored his first points in the World Rally Championship on the 1989 Tour de Corse when he finished seventh, driving for Ford. In 1991 he scored his first podium by finishing third on the Tour de Corse. On the 1993 Rallye Sanremo he took a surprise win as a privateer driver.

He won the Monza Rally Show in 1986 and 1990, the Italian Rally Championship in 1994, 1995 and 1996, and in 2000 and 2001 he won the Italian Gravel title.

== WRC victories ==
#	Event	Season	Co-driver	Car
1	(Italy) 35º Rallye Sanremo - Rallye d'Italia	1993	Stefano Evangelisti	Ford Escort RS Cosworth

Sporting positions
Preceded by Gilberto Pianezzola	Italian Rally Champion; 1994-1996	Succeeded by Andrea Dallavilla
