= Rallye Sanremo =

Automobile rally competition held in Sanremo, Italy

- Status: Active
- Genre: Motorsporting event
- Frequency: Annual
- Country: Italy
- Inaugurated: 1928; 98 years ago
- Most recent: 2026
- Website: rallyesanremo.it
- 2026

Rallye Sanremo is a rally competition held in Sanremo, Italy. Except for the 1995 event, the event was part of the FIA World Rally Championship schedule from 1973 to the 2003. It was a round of the Intercontinental Rally Challenge and is currently a round of the Italian national rally championship.

== History ==
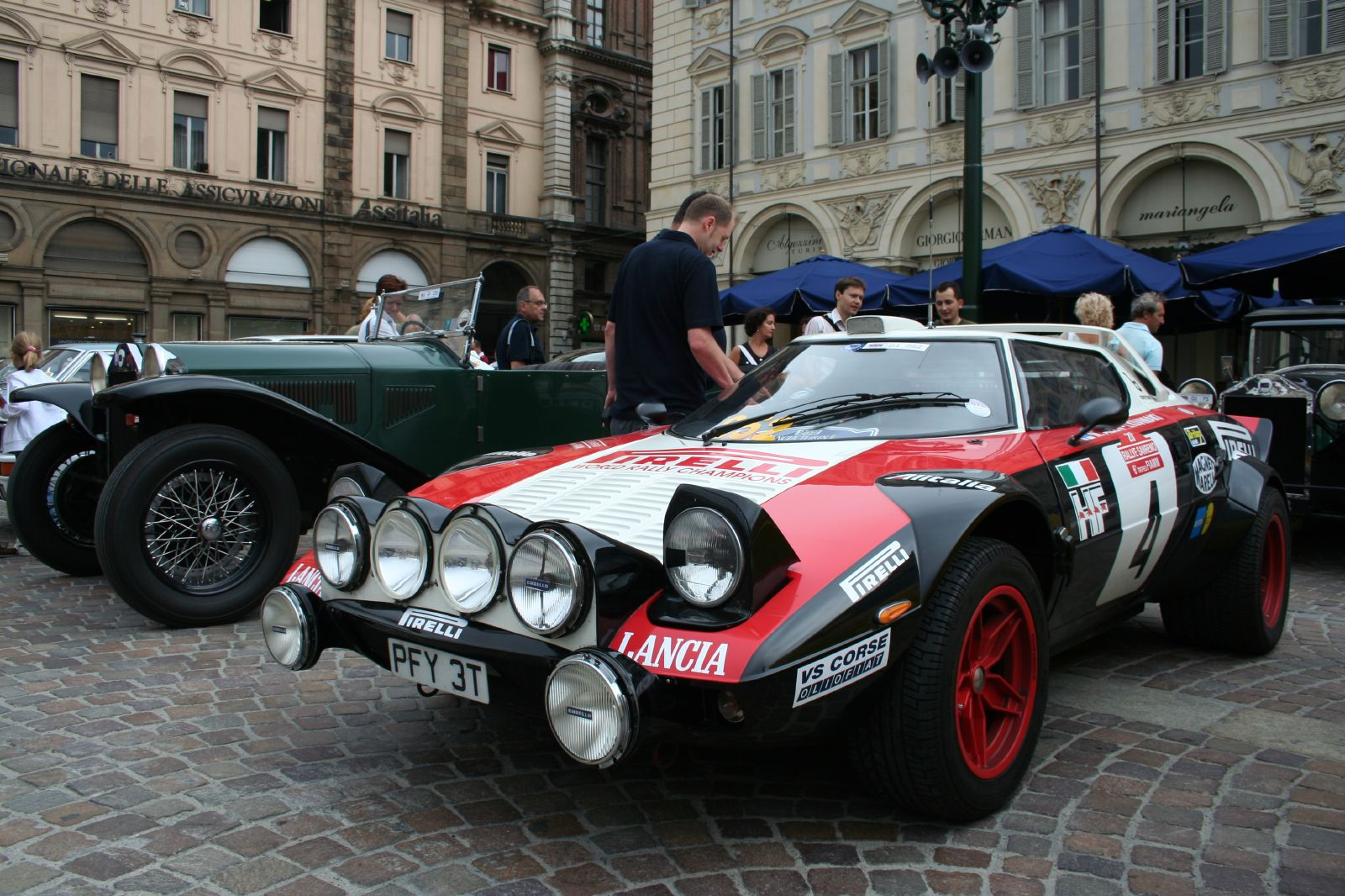
Replica of Markku Alén's 1978 Sanremo -winning Lancia Stratos HF.

The first "Rallye Internazionale di Sanremo" was held in 1928. The rally name's French word "rallye", as opposed to Italian "rally", was inspired by Rallye Automobile Monte Carlo. After another successful rally in 1929, the event was given to new organisers who decided to set up a street race through the town of Sanremo instead. The first one, 1° Circuito Automobilistico Sanremo, was held in 1937 and won by Achille Varzi. Rallye Sanremo was restarted in 1961 as Rallye dei Fiori ("Rally of the Flowers") and has been held every year since.

From 1970 to 1972, Rallye Sanremo was part of the International Championship for Manufacturers. From 1973 to 2003, the rally was on the World Rally Championship schedule, except for 1995 when the event was only part of the FIA 2-Litre World Championship for Manufacturers. The rally became the centre of controversy in 1986 after the stewards disqualified the factory Peugeot team at the end of the third day for using illegal side skirts, handing the victory to Lancia. Peugeot had used the same configuration in earlier rallies without any scrutineering problems and had also passed pre-rally scrutineering. Peugeot appealed but the organisers did not allow the team to continue the rally. FIA later confirmed that the exclusion had been illegal as the Peugeot cars were legal, and decided to annul the results of the whole event.

Rallye Sanremo was originally a mixed surface event (tarmac and gravel) but from 1997 on it was organised as an all-tarmac rally. After being dropped from the WRC schedule (in favor of Rally di Sardegna in 2004), Rallye Sanremo has been part of the Italian Rally Championship. Since 2006, it has also been a round of the Intercontinental Rally Challenge. In 2015 the organizers and FIA decided to include Rallye Femminile Perla di Sanremo (from 1952 to 1956) as a part of Rallye Sanremo. The purpose for this decision was to honor Women's Italian Rally Series driven in Sanremo in the 1950s. Due to these changes 57° Rallye Sanremo in 2015 turned into 62° Rallye Sanremo and will continue with this numbering system.

The Sanremo Rally Storico is a classic rally held since 1986, and is included in the European Historic Rally Championship.

== Winners ==
Season	Event	Driver	Car	Manufacturer
1928	Rallye Internazionale di Sanremo	(Romania) Ernest Urdareanu	Fiat 520	(Italy) Fiat (1)
1929	Rallye Internazionale di Sanremo	(Romania) Ernest Urdareanu	Fiat 521	(Italy) Fiat (2)
1952	1° Rallye Femminile Perla di Sanremo	(Italy) Paola Della Chiesa	Lancia Aurelia GT	(Italy) Lancia (1)
1953	2° Rallye Femminile Perla di Sanremo	(Italy) Luisa Rezzonico	Lancia Aurelia	(Italy) Lancia (2)
1954	3° Rallye Femminile Perla di Sanremo	(Italy) Paola Della Chiesa	Alfa Romeo 1900	(Italy) Alfa Romeo (1)
1955	4° Rallye Femminile Perla di Sanremo	(Italy) Paola Della Chiesa	Lancia Aurelia B22	(Italy) Lancia (3)
1956	5° Rallye Femminile Perla di Sanremo	(Italy) Goffreda Cambieri	Isetta	(Italy) Iso
1961	1º Rallye dei Fiori	(Italy) Giovan Battista De Villa	Alfa Romeo Giulietta	(Italy) Alfa Romeo (2)
1962	2º Rallye dei Fiori	(Italy) Piero Frescobaldi	Lancia Flavia	(Italy) Lancia (4)
1963	3º Rallye dei Fiori	(Italy) Franco Patria	Lancia Flavia Coupè	(Italy) Lancia (5)
1964	4º Rallye dei Fiori	(Sweden) Erik Carlsson	Saab 96 Sport	(Sweden) Saab
1965	5º Rallye dei Fiori	(Italy) Leo Cella	Lancia Fulvia 2C	(Italy) Lancia (6)
1966	6º Rallye dei Fiori	(Italy) Leo Cella	Lancia Fulvia HF	(Italy) Lancia (7)
1967	7º Rallye dei Fiori	(France) Jean-François Piot	Renault Gordini	(France) Renault (1)
1968	8º Rallye di Sanremo	(Finland) Pauli Toivonen	Porsche 911	(Germany) Porsche
1969	9º Rallye di Sanremo	(Sweden) Harry Källström	Lancia Fulvia HF	(Italy) Lancia (8)
1970	1º Sanremo-Sestriere – Rally d'Italia	(France) Jean-Luc Thérier	Alpine-Renault A110 1600	(France) Alpine (1)
1971	2º Sanremo-Sestriere – Rally d'Italia	(Sweden) Ove Andersson	Alpine-Renault A110 1600	(France) Alpine (2)
1972	10º Rallye Sanremo	(Italy) Amilcare Ballestrieri	Lancia Fulvia 1.6 Coupé HF	(Italy) Lancia (9)
1973	11º Rallye Sanremo	(France) Jean-Luc Thérier	Alpine-Renault A110 1800	(France) Alpine (3)
1974	12º Rallye Sanremo	(Italy) Sandro Munari	Lancia Stratos HF	(Italy) Lancia (10)
1975	13º Rallye Sanremo	(Sweden) Björn Waldegård	Lancia Stratos HF	(Italy) Lancia (11)
1976	14º Rallye Sanremo	(Sweden) Björn Waldegård	Lancia Stratos HF	(Italy) Lancia (12)
1977	15º Rallye Sanremo	(France) Jean-Claude Andruet	Fiat 131 Abarth	(Italy) Fiat (3)
1978	20º Rallye Sanremo	(Finland) Markku Alén	Lancia Stratos HF	(Italy) Lancia (13)
1979	21º Rallye Sanremo	(Italy) Antonio Fassina	Lancia Stratos HF	(Italy) Lancia (14)
1980	22º Rallye Sanremo	(Germany) Walter Röhrl	Fiat 131 Abarth	(Italy) Fiat (4)
1981	23º Rallye Sanremo	(France) Michèle Mouton	Audi Quattro	(Germany) Audi (1)
1982	24º Rallye Sanremo	(Sweden) Stig Blomqvist	Audi Quattro	(Germany) Audi (2)
1983	25º Rallye Sanremo	(Finland) Markku Alén	Lancia Rally 037	(Italy) Lancia (15)
1984	26º Rallye Sanremo	(Finland) Ari Vatanen	Peugeot 205 Turbo 16	(France) Peugeot (1)
1985	27º Rallye Sanremo	(Germany) Walter Röhrl	Audi Quattro S1	(Germany) Audi (3)
1986	28º Rallye Sanremo^{[1]}	(Finland) Markku Alén	Lancia Delta S4	(Italy) Lancia (16)
1987	29º Rallye Sanremo	(Italy) Miki Biasion	Lancia Delta HF 4WD	(Italy) Lancia (17)
1988	30º Rallye Sanremo – Rallye d'Italia	(Italy) Miki Biasion	Lancia Delta HF Integrale	(Italy) Lancia (18)
1989	31º Rallye Sanremo – Rallye d'Italia	(Italy) Miki Biasion	Lancia Delta HF Integrale 16v	(Italy) Lancia (19)
1990	32º Rallye Sanremo – Rallye d'Italia	(France) Didier Auriol	Lancia Delta HF Integrale 16v	(Italy) Lancia (20)
1991	33º Rallye Sanremo – Rallye d'Italia	(France) Didier Auriol	Lancia Delta HF Integrale 16v	(Italy) Lancia (21)
1992	34º Rallye Sanremo – Rallye d'Italia	(Italy) Andrea Aghini	Lancia Delta HF Integrale	(Italy) Lancia (22)
1993	35º Rallye Sanremo – Rallye d'Italia	(Italy) Franco Cunico	Ford Escort RS Cosworth	(United States) Ford (1)
1994	36º Rallye Sanremo – Rallye d'Italia	(France) Didier Auriol	Toyota Celica Turbo 4WD	(Japan) Toyota (1)
1995	37º Rallye Sanremo – Rallye d'Italia	(Italy) Piero Liatti	Subaru Impreza 555	(Japan) Subaru (1)
1996	38º Rallye Sanremo – Rallye d'Italia	(United Kingdom) Colin McRae	Subaru Impreza 555	(Japan) Subaru (2)
1997	39º Rallye Sanremo – Rallye d'Italia	(United Kingdom) Colin McRae	Subaru Impreza WRC 97	(Japan) Subaru (3)
1998	40º Rallye Sanremo – Rallye d'Italia	(Finland) Tommi Mäkinen	Mitsubishi Lancer Evo V	(Japan) Mitsubishi (1)
1999	41º Rallye Sanremo – Rallye d'Italia	(Finland) Tommi Mäkinen	Mitsubishi Lancer Evo VI	(Japan) Mitsubishi (2)
2000	42º Rallye Sanremo – Rallye d'Italia	(France) Gilles Panizzi	Peugeot 206 WRC	(France) Peugeot (2)
2001	43º Rallye Sanremo – Rallye d'Italia	(France) Gilles Panizzi	Peugeot 206 WRC	(France) Peugeot (3)
2002	44º Rallye Sanremo – Rallye d'Italia	(France) Gilles Panizzi	Peugeot 206 WRC	(France) Peugeot (4)
2003	45º Rallye Sanremo – Rallye d'Italia	(France) Sébastien Loeb	Citroën Xsara WRC	(France) Citroën (1)
2004	46º Rallye Sanremo	(Italy) Renato Travaglia	Peugeot 206 XS S1600	(France) Peugeot (5)
2005	47º Rallye Sanremo	(Italy) Alessandro Perico	Renault Clio S1600	(France) Renault (2)
2006	48º Rallye Sanremo	(Italy) Paolo Andreucci	Fiat Grande Punto S2000	(Italy) Fiat (5)
2007	49º Rallye Sanremo	(Italy) Luca Rossetti	Peugeot 207 S2000	(France) Peugeot (6)
2008	50º Rallye Sanremo	(Italy) Giandomenico Basso	Abarth Grande Punto S2000	(Italy) Abarth
2009	51º Rallye Sanremo	(United Kingdom) Kris Meeke	Peugeot 207 S2000	(France) Peugeot (7)
2010	52º Rallye Sanremo	(Italy) Paolo Andreucci	Peugeot 207 S2000	(France) Peugeot (8)
2011	53º Rallye Sanremo	(Belgium) Thierry Neuville	Peugeot 207 S2000	(France) Peugeot (9)
2012	54º Rallye Sanremo	(Italy) Giandomenico Basso	Ford Fiesta RRC	(United States) Ford (2)
2013	55º Rallye Sanremo	(Italy) Giandomenico Basso	Peugeot 207 S2000	(France) Peugeot (10)
2014	56º Rallye Sanremo	(Italy) Umberto Scandola	Škoda Fabia S2000	(Czech Republic) Skoda (1)
2015	62° Rallye Sanremo^{[2]}	(Italy) Paolo Andreucci	Peugeot 208 T16	(France) Peugeot (11)
2016	63º Rallye Sanremo	(Italy) Paolo Andreucci	Peugeot 208 T16	(France) Peugeot (12)
2017	64° Rallye Sanremo	(Italy) Paolo Andreucci	Peugeot 208 T16	(France) Peugeot (13)
2018	65° Rallye Sanremo	(Italy) Paolo Andreucci	Peugeot 208 T16	(France) Peugeot (14)
2019	66° Rallye Sanremo	(Republic of Ireland) Craig Breen	Škoda Fabia R5	(Czech Republic) Skoda (2)
2020	Event cancelled due to COVID-19 pandemic			
2021	68° Rallye Sanremo	(Republic of Ireland) Craig Breen	Hyundai i20 R5	(South Korea) Hyundai
2022	69° Rallye Sanremo	(Italy) Fabio Andolfi	Škoda Fabia Rally2 evo	(Czech Republic) Skoda (3)
2023	70° Rallye Sanremo	(Italy) Giandomenico Basso	Škoda Fabia RS Rally2	(Czech Republic) Skoda (4)
2024	71° Rallye Sanremo	(Italy) Giandomenico Basso	Toyota GR Yaris Rally2	(Japan) Toyota (2)
2025	72° Rallye Sanremo	(Italy) Andrea Crugnola	Citroën C3 Rally2	(France) Citroën (2)
2026	73° Rallye Sanremo	(Italy) Fabio Andolfi	Lancia Ypsilon Rally2 HF Integrale	(Italy) Lancia (23)

^{1} FIA later annulled the results of the 1986 event.
^{2} In 2015 the organizers and FIA included Rallye Femminile Perla (from 1952 to 1956) di Sanremo as a part of Rallye Sanremo and changed the numbering system from 57° to 62°.

=== Multiple winners ===
Wins	Driver	Years
6	(Italy) Paolo Andreucci	2006, 2010, 2015–2018
5	(Italy) Giandomenico Basso	2008, 2012–2013, 2022-2024
3	(Finland) Markku Alen	1978, 1983, 1986
3	(France) Didier Auriol	1990–1991, 1994
3	(Italy) Miki Biasion	1987–1989
3	(France) Gilles Panizzi	2000–2002
3	(Italy) Paola Della Chiesa	1952, 1954–1955
2	(Italy) Leo Cella	1965–1966
2	(Finland) Tommi Makinen	1998–1999
2	(United Kingdom) Colin McRae	1996–1997
2	(Germany) Walter Rohrl	1980, 1985
2	(France) Jean-Luc Therier	1970, 1973
2	(Sweden) Bjorn Waldegard	1975–1976
2	(Romania) Ernest Urdareanu	1928–1929
2	(Republic of Ireland) Craig Breen	2019, 2021
2	(Italy) Fabio Andolfi	2022, 2026

Wins	Manufacturer
23	(Italy) Lancia
14	(France) Peugeot
5	(Italy) Fiat
4	(Czech Republic) Skoda
3	(France) Alpine
3	(Germany) Audi
3	(Japan) Subaru
