= 1986 World Rally Championship =

14th season of the FIA World Rally Championship

Champions
- World Drivers' Champion: Juha Kankkunen
- World Manufacturers' Champion: Peugeot

Seasons
- ← 1985 1987 →

The 1986 World Rally Championship was the 14th season of the Fédération Internationale de l'Automobile (FIA) World Rally Championship (WRC). The season consisted of 13 rallies, including all twelve venues of the previous season as well as the addition of the Olympus Rally. This marked the return of the WRC to the United States and North America, as well as the first world rally to be held on the western side of the continent. The December rally would also be the only WRC event to feature Group B competition in the United States.

The 1986 season was notable for being the last World Rally Championship season driven with the popular Group B rally cars, which were banned after the fatal crashes at the Rally Portugal, where three spectators were killed and more than 30 injured, and at the Tour de Corse, where Henri Toivonen and his co-driver Sergio Cresto died in a fireball accident. This was the year where Group B (first introduced in 1982) was at its peak, and the 1986 season saw some of the most powerful and sophisticated rally cars ever built, some of which were mid-engined, like the Lancia Delta S4 and the Ford RS200. The drivers' championship was won by Peugeot's Juha Kankkunen, followed by two other "Flying Finns", Lancia's Markku Alén and Kankkunen's teammate Timo Salonen. The manufacturers' title was taken by Peugeot, after a close battle with the Martini-sponsored Lancia team.

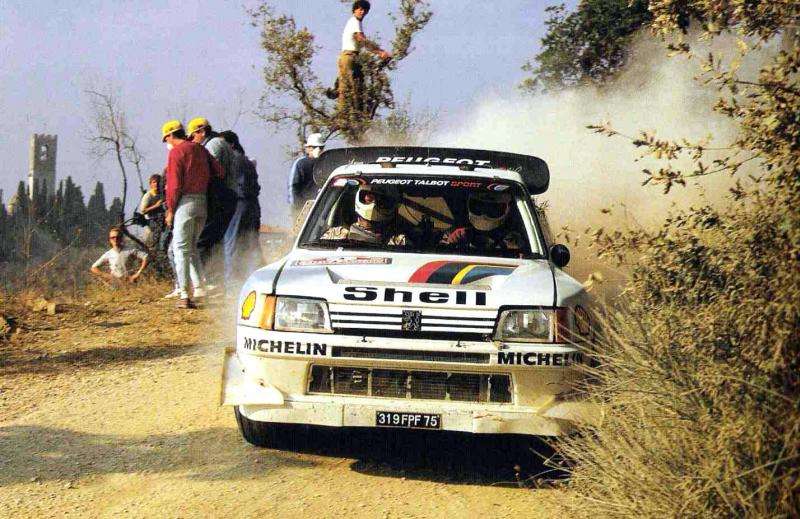
Eventual champion Juha Kankkunen driving a Peugeot 205 Turbo 16 E2 at the 1986 Rallye Sanremo.

== Summary ==
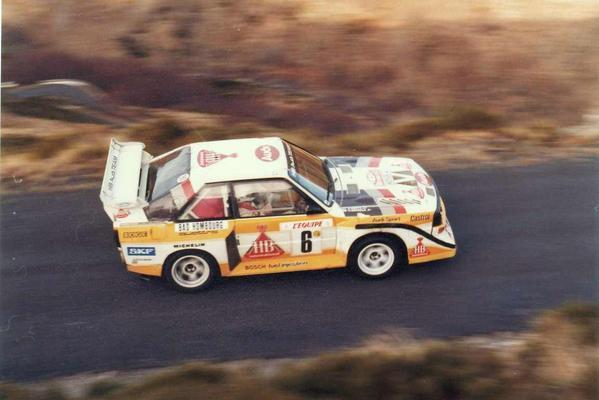
Hannu Mikkola at the Monte Carlo Rally

The season began with the Monte Carlo Rally and Henri Toivonen took the win with his Lancia Delta S4, making himself the favourite for the title. At the International Swedish Rally in wintery snow and ice, Toivonen had to retire due to an engine failure and Juha Kankkunen won the event with his Peugeot 205 Turbo 16 E2, ahead of Toivonen's teammate Markku Alén. At the next rally in Portugal, Joaquim Santos lost control of his Ford RS200 and plunged into the crowd, killing three spectators and injuring more than 30. All the factory team drivers decided to withdraw from the race, giving the win to home country's relatively unknown driver, Joaquim Moutinho.

After veteran Swede Björn Waldegård's triumph at the extremely arduous and difficult Safari Rally in Kenya driving a Toyota Celica TCT over Alén and his Lancia 037 Evo (which was the S4's predecessor and used only by Lancia for the Safari Rally; the S4 was not used for the Safari Rally due to Lancia determining that it was too new and not developed enough for that rally), another fatal accident at the Tour de Corse on the French island of Corsica would change the course of rallying. Toivonen and his co-driver Sergio Cresto in their Lancia went off the side of the road, plunged down a ravine and landed on its roof. The aluminium fuel tank underneath the driver's seat was ruptured by the trees and exploded. Toivonen and Cresto had no time to get out and both men burned to death in their seats. The accident had no witnesses close enough to clearly see the accident.

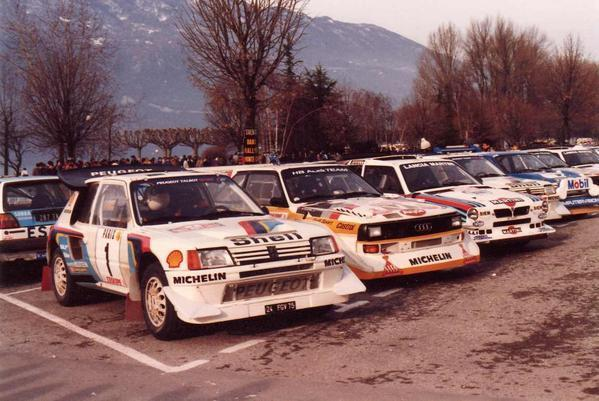
Peugeot 205 T16 E2, Audi Quattro S1 and Lancia Delta S4 in Monte Carlo

This caused Jean-Marie Balestre and the FISA to immediately freeze the development of the Group B cars and ban them from competing for the 1987 season. Audi and Ford decided to withdraw from competing, while other teams continued with their Group B models until the end of the season. Peugeot boss Jean Todt was outraged over the ban and pursued legal action against the federation. After Lancia's remaining car retirement, the Tour de Corse was eventually won by Peugeot's Bruno Saby, which marked his career-first WRC victory. The Acropolis Rally in Greece and the New Zealand Rally were won consecutively by Kankkunen; and the third driver to take his debut win during the season was Lancia's Miki Biasion, who edged out teammate Alén to win the Rally Argentina.

Finnish drivers finished first, second and third in the Jyväskylä Rally (otherwise known as the Finnish Rally, the fastest race of the year), with Salonen and Kankkunen giving Peugeot a 1-2 result, with Alén coming in third for Lancia. This was not much of a surprise, as this rally had only ever been won by Finnish and Swedish drivers until 1990. The Ivory Coast Rally, which was considered to be the most demanding, gruelling and certainly the most attrition-filled rally of the year (a rally where drivers had an unbelievable one in ten chance of finishing) was skipped by all of the Group B teams except Toyota, and was won by Waldegård in his Celica, completing his World Championship African rally sweep. The season included more controversy when the organizers of the Rallye Sanremo disqualified the entire Peugeot team from the event due to illegal side skirts. However, the cars were proven legal by the FIA, and the Italian organizers were blamed for not allowing French Peugeots to take the win ahead of the Italian Lancias. Eventually, the FISA annulled the results of the whole event. Peugeot then became the manufacturers' champions, but Kankkunen was not sure about his title over Alén until three weeks after the season ended, at the RAC Rally in the United Kingdom, specifically Wales and England. Salonen won this race, with Alen finishing second and Kankkunen third, this was enough for Kankkunen to take the Driver's Championship. The last WRC round of the year was the first Olympus Rally in the state of Washington in the northwest United States, which Alén won, with Kankkunen finishing second.

1986 marked the only season in which the FIA issued the World Championship for Drivers of Group A Cars. Swede Kenneth Eriksson, driving a Volkswagen Golf GTI 16V took the title ahead of Austrian Rudi Stohl in his Audi Coupé Quattro, a lower powered version of the Group B Quattros. This championship became unnecessary in future years due to the elimination of Group B cars. From 1987 onwards, Group A cars would be the vehicles used by drivers competing for the main World Rally Championship for Drivers.

== Calendar ==
Rd.	Start date	Finish date	Rally	Rally headquarters	Surface	Stages	Distance	Points
1	18 January	24 January	(Monaco) 54th Rallye Automobile Monte-Carlo	Monte Carlo	Mixed	36	881.20 km	Drivers & Manufacturers
2	14 February	16 February	(Sweden) 36th International Swedish Rally	Karlstad, Värmland County	Snow	30	556.79 km	Drivers & Manufacturers
3	5 March	8 March	20th Rallye de Portugal - Vinho do Porto	Estoril, Lisbon	Mixed	48	703.50 km	Drivers & Manufacturers
4	29 March	2 April	(Kenya) 34th Marlboro Safari Rally	Nairobi	Gravel	N/A	4190 km	Drivers & Manufacturers
5	1 May	3 May	30th Tour de Corse - Rallye de France	Ajaccio, Corsica	Tarmac	30	1122.34 km	Drivers & Manufacturers
6	2 June	4 June	(Greece) 33rd Bosch Acropolis Rally	Athens	Gravel	46	689.92 km	Drivers & Manufacturers
7	5 July	8 July	17th AWA Clarion Rally of New Zealand	Auckland	Gravel	35	597.76 km	Drivers & Manufacturers
8	6 August	9 August	6th Marlboro Rally of Argentina	Buenos Aires	Gravel	27	624.35 km	Drivers & Manufacturers
9	5 September	7 September	(Finland) 36th Rally of the 1000 Lakes	Jyväskylä, Central Finland	Gravel	48	389.97 km	Drivers & Manufacturers
10	24 September	27 September	(Ivory Coast) 18th Rallye Cote d'Ivoire	Yamoussoukro	Gravel	N/A	3763 km	Drivers only
11	13 October	17 October	(Italy) 28th Rallye Sanremo	Sanremo, Liguria	Mixed	40	532.60 km	Drivers & Manufacturers
12	16 November	19 November	(United Kingdom) 42nd Lombard RAC Rally	Bath, Somerset	Gravel	45	515.04 km	Drivers & Manufacturers
13	4 December	7 December	(United States) 14th Toyota Olympus Rally	Tacoma, Washington	Gravel	40	540.65 km	Drivers only

== Teams and drivers ==
Team	Manufacturer	Car	Tyre	Drivers	Rounds
(France) Peugeot Talbot Sport	Peugeot	205 Turbo 16 E2	M	(Finland) Timo Salonen	1–3, 5–7, 9, 11–12
(France) Peugeot Talbot Sport	Peugeot	205 Turbo 16 E2	M	(Finland) Juha Kankkunen	1–4, 6–9, 11–13
(France) Peugeot Talbot Sport	Peugeot	205 Turbo 16 E2	M	(France) Bruno Saby	1, 5–6, 8, 11
(France) Peugeot Talbot Sport	Peugeot	205 Turbo 16 E2	M	(France) Michèle Mouton	1, 5
(France) Peugeot Talbot Sport	Peugeot	205 Turbo 16 E2	M	(Kenya) Shekhar Mehta	4
(France) Peugeot Talbot Sport	Peugeot	205 Turbo 16 E2	M	(Sweden) Stig Blomqvist	9
(France) Peugeot Talbot Sport	Peugeot	205 Turbo 16 E2	M	(Italy) Andrea Zanussi	11
(France) Peugeot Talbot Sport	Peugeot	205 Turbo 16 E2	M	(Italy) Paolo Alessandrini	11
(France) Peugeot Talbot Sport	Peugeot	205 Turbo 16 E2	M	(Finland) Mikael Sundström	12
(France) Peugeot Talbot Sport	Peugeot	205 Turbo 16 E2	M	(United States) Jon Woodner	13
(Germany) Audi Sport	Audi	Quattro Sport S1	M	(Germany) Walter Röhrl	1, 3, 6
(Germany) Audi Sport	Audi	Quattro Sport S1	M	(Finland) Hannu Mikkola	1, 6
(Germany) Audi Sport	Audi	Quattro Sport S1	M	(Austria) Rudi Stohl	1, 3–4, 6–8, 10–11
(Germany) Audi Sport	Audi	Quattro Sport S1	M	(Sweden) Mikael Ericsson	2
(Germany) Audi Sport	Audi	Quattro Sport S1	M	(Sweden) Gunner Pettersson	2
(Germany) Audi Sport	Audi	Quattro Sport S1	M	(New Zealand) Malcolm Stewart	7
(Germany) Audi Sport	Audi	Quattro Sport S1	M	(Austria) Wilfred Wiedner	10
(Germany) Audi Sport	Audi	Quattro Sport S1	M	(France) Adolphe Choteau	10
(Germany) Audi Sport	Audi	Quattro Sport S1	M	(Germany) Harald Demuth	12
(Germany) Audi Sport	Audi	Quattro Sport S1	M	(United States) John Buffum	13
(Italy) Martini Lancia	Lancia	Delta S4; Rally 037 evo*	P	(Finland) Markku Alén	1–9, 11–13
(Italy) Martini Lancia	Lancia	Delta S4; Rally 037 evo*	P	(Finland) Henri Toivonen	1–3, 5
(Italy) Martini Lancia	Lancia	Delta S4; Rally 037 evo*	P	(Italy) Miki Biasion	1, 3–8, 11
(Italy) Martini Lancia	Lancia	Delta S4; Rally 037 evo*	P	(Kenya) Vic Preston Jr	4
(Italy) Martini Lancia	Lancia	Delta S4; Rally 037 evo*	P	(Kenya) Greg Criticos	4
(Italy) Martini Lancia	Lancia	Delta S4; Rally 037 evo*	P	(Kenya) John Hellier	4
(Italy) Martini Lancia	Lancia	Delta S4; Rally 037 evo*	P	(Sweden) Mikael Ericsson	6–7, 9, 12
(Italy) Martini Lancia	Lancia	Delta S4; Rally 037 evo*	P	(Argentina) Jorge Recalde	8
(Italy) Martini Lancia	Lancia	Delta S4; Rally 037 evo*	P	(Sweden) Kalle Grundel	9
(Italy) Martini Lancia	Lancia	Delta S4; Rally 037 evo*	P	(Italy) Dario Cerrato	11
(Italy) Martini Lancia	Lancia	Delta S4; Rally 037 evo*	P	(Italy) Paolo Alessandriani	13
(United Kingdom) Austin Rover World Rally Team	MG	Metro 6R4	M	(United Kingdom) Tony Pond	1, 3, 5, 11–12
(United Kingdom) Austin Rover World Rally Team	MG	Metro 6R4	M	(United Kingdom) Malcolm Wilson	1–3, 5, 9, 11–12
(United Kingdom) Austin Rover World Rally Team	MG	Metro 6R4	M	(Sweden) Per Eklund	2, 9, 12
(United Kingdom) Austin Rover World Rally Team	MG	Metro 6R4	M	(Belgium) Marc Duez	3, 11–12
(United Kingdom) Austin Rover World Rally Team	MG	Metro 6R4	M	(France) Didier Auriol	5
(United Kingdom) Austin Rover World Rally Team	MG	Metro 6R4	M	(Finland) Harri Toivonen	9, 12
(United Kingdom) Austin Rover World Rally Team	MG	Metro 6R4	M	(United Kingdom) David Llewellin	12
(United Kingdom) Austin Rover World Rally Team	MG	Metro 6R4	M	(United Kingdom) Jimmy McRae	12
(France) Citroën Compétitions	Citroën	BX 4TC	M	(France) Jean-Claude Andruet	1–2, 6
(France) Citroën Compétitions	Citroën	BX 4TC	M	(France) Philippe Wambergue	1–2, 6
(France) Citroën Compétitions	Citroën	BX 4TC	M	(France) Maurice Chomat	6
(United Kingdom) Ford Motor Co Ltd	Ford	RS200	P	(Sweden) Stig Blomqvist	2–3, 6, 12
(United Kingdom) Ford Motor Co Ltd	Ford	RS200	P	(Sweden) Kalle Grundel	2–3, 6, 12
(United Kingdom) Ford Motor Co Ltd	Ford	RS200	P	(Portugal) Joaquim Santos	3
(United Kingdom) Ford Motor Co Ltd	Ford	RS200	P	(United Kingdom) Mark Lovell	12
(United Kingdom) Ford Motor Co Ltd	Ford	RS200	P	(Sweden) Stig Andervang	12
(Japan) Toyota Team Europe	Toyota	Celica TCT	P	(Sweden) Björn Waldegård	4, 10, 13
(Japan) Toyota Team Europe	Toyota	Celica TCT	P	(Germany) Erwin Weber	4, 10
(Japan) Toyota Team Europe	Toyota	Celica TCT	P	(Sweden) Lars-Erik Torph	4, 10, 13
(Japan) Toyota Team Europe	Toyota	Celica TCT	P	(Kenya) Robin Ulyate	10
(Japan) Toyota Team Europe	Toyota	Celica TCT	P	(New Zealand) Steve Millen	13
(Germany) Opel Euro Team	Opel	Manta 400	M	(Kenya) Basil Criticos	4, 8
(Japan) Mazda Rally Team Europe	Mazda	Familia 4WD	M	(Sweden) Ingvar Carlsson	1–2, 9, 12
(Japan) Mazda Rally Team Europe	Mazda	Familia 4WD	M	(Germany) Achim Warmbold	1
(Japan) Mazda Rally Team Europe	Mazda	Familia 4WD	M	(New Zealand) Rod Millen	7, 13
(Germany) Volkswagen Motorsport	Volkswagen	Golf GTi	P	(Austria) Franz Wittmann	1, 3–6, 8
(Germany) Volkswagen Motorsport	Volkswagen	Golf GTi	P	(Sweden) Kenneth Eriksson	1–9, 11–12
(Japan) Fuji Heavy Industries	Subaru	RX Turbo	P	(Kenya) Mike Kirkland	4, 7
(Japan) Fuji Heavy Industries	Subaru	RX Turbo	P	(New Zealand) Possum Bourne	4, 7, 13
(Japan) Fuji Heavy Industries	Subaru	RX Turbo	P	(Kenya) Frank Tundo	4, 7
(France) Renault Elf Philips	Renault	11 Turbo	M	(France) Jean Ragnotti	5, 11
(Czech Republic) Škoda Motorsport	Škoda	Škoda 130 LR	P	(Czech Republic) Ladislav Krecek	6, 9
(Czech Republic) Škoda Motorsport	Škoda	Škoda 130 LR	P	(Czech Republic) Svatopluk Kvaizar	6, 9
Major entries not registered as manufacturers
(Italy) Jolly Club	Fiat	Uno Turbo	P	(Italy) Giovanni del Zoppo	1, 3, 5–6, 11
(Italy) Jolly Club	Fiat	Uno Turbo	P	(Italy) Michele Rayneri	1, 5–6, 11
(Italy) Jolly Club	Fiat	Uno Turbo	P	(Italy) Alex Fiorio	1, 3, 5, 11
(Japan) Team Nissan Europe	Nissan	240RS	D	(Kenya) Jayant Shah	4
(Japan) Team Nissan Europe	Nissan	240RS	D	(Greece) George Moschous	6
(Japan) Team Nissan Europe	Nissan	240RS	D	(Greece) Stratis Hatzipanayiotou	6
(Japan) Team Nissan Europe	Nissan	240RS	D	(New Zealand) Reg Cook	7
(Japan) Team Nissan Europe	Nissan	240RS	D	(New Zealand) Paddy Davidson	7
(Japan) Team Nissan Europe	Nissan	240RS	D	(France) Alain Ambrosino	10
(Japan) Team Nissan Europe	Nissan	240RS	D	(United Kingdom) Louise Aitken-Walker	12
(France) Société Diac	Renault	R5 Maxi Turbo	M	(France) François Chatriot	5
(Germany) Rothmans Porsche Rally Team	Porsche	911SC RS	M	(Qatar) Saeed Al-Hajri	6

- Lancia ran out of time to build the safari version of the Delta S4

== Events ==
=== Map ===
Black = Tarmac	Brown = Gravel	Blue = Snow/ice	Red = Mixed surface

=== Schedule and results ===
Round	Rally name	Stages	Podium finishers					
Round	Rally name	Stages	Rank	Driver	Co-driver	Team	Car	Time
1	(Monaco) Rallye Automobile Monte Carlo (18–24 January)	36 stages 867 km Tarmac/Snow	1	(Finland) Henri Toivonen	(United States) Sergio Cresto	(Italy) Martini Racing	Lancia Delta S4	10:11:24
1	(Monaco) Rallye Automobile Monte Carlo (18–24 January)	36 stages 867 km Tarmac/Snow	2	(Finland) Timo Salonen	(Finland) Seppo Harjanne	(France) Peugeot Talbot Sport	Peugeot 205 Turbo 16 E2	10:15:28
1	(Monaco) Rallye Automobile Monte Carlo (18–24 January)	36 stages 867 km Tarmac/Snow	3	(Finland) Hannu Mikkola	(Sweden) Arne Hertz	(West Germany) Audi Sport	Audi Sport Quattro S1	10:18:46
2	(Sweden) Swedish Rally (14–16 February)	30 stages 558 km Snow/Ice	1	(Finland) Juha Kankkunen	(Finland) Juha Piironen	(France) Peugeot Talbot Sport	Peugeot 205 Turbo 16 E2	5:09:19
2	(Sweden) Swedish Rally (14–16 February)	30 stages 558 km Snow/Ice	2	(Finland) Markku Alén	(Finland) Ilkka Kivimäki	(Italy) Martini Racing	Lancia Delta S4	5:11:13
2	(Sweden) Swedish Rally (14–16 February)	30 stages 558 km Snow/Ice	3	(Sweden) Kalle Grundel	(United Kingdom) Terry Harryman	(United Kingdom) Ford Motor Co Ltd	Ford RS200	5:15:35
3	Rallye de Portugal (5–8 March)	42 stages 556 km Gravel/Tarmac	1	(Portugal) Joaquim Moutinho	(Portugal) Edgar Fortes	(Portugal) Renault Galp	Renault 5 Turbo	7:50:44
3	Rallye de Portugal (5–8 March)	42 stages 556 km Gravel/Tarmac	2	(Portugal) Carlos Bica	(Portugal) Cândido Júnior	(Portugal) Duriforte Construções	Lancia Rally 037	8:04:11
3	Rallye de Portugal (5–8 March)	42 stages 556 km Gravel/Tarmac	3	(Italy) Giovanni Del Zoppo	(Italy) Loris Roggia	(Italy) Jolly Club	Fiat Uno Turbo	8:07:36
4	(Kenya) Safari Rally (29 March–2 April)	63 controls 4190 km Gravel	1	(Sweden) Björn Waldegård	(United Kingdom) Fred Gallagher	(Japan) Toyota Team Europe	Toyota Celica TCT	+5:06 pen
4	(Kenya) Safari Rally (29 March–2 April)	63 controls 4190 km Gravel	2	(Sweden) Lars-Erik Torph	(Sweden) Bo Thorszelius	(Japan) Toyota Team Europe	Toyota Celica TCT	+5:34 pen
4	(Kenya) Safari Rally (29 March–2 April)	63 controls 4190 km Gravel	3	(Finland) Markku Alén	(Finland) Ilkka Kivimäki	(Italy) Martini Racing	Lancia Rally 037 evo	+6.12 pen
5	(France) Tour de Corse (1–3 May)	24 stages 1017 km Tarmac	1	(France) Bruno Saby	(France) Jean-François Fauchille	(France) Peugeot Talbot Sport	Peugeot 205 Turbo 16 E2	11:52:44
5	(France) Tour de Corse (1–3 May)	24 stages 1017 km Tarmac	2	(France) François Chatriot	(France) Michel Périn	(France) Société Diac	Renault 5 Maxi Turbo	12:06:32
5	(France) Tour de Corse (1–3 May)	24 stages 1017 km Tarmac	3	(France) Yves Loubet	(France) Jean-Marc Andrié	(France) Alfa Romeo Rothmans Team	Alfa Romeo Alfetta GTV6	12:45:59
6	(Greece) Acropolis Rally (2–4 June)	38 stages 575 km Gravel	1	(Finland) Juha Kankkunen	(Finland) Juha Piironen	(France) Peugeot Talbot Sport	Peugeot 205 Turbo 16 E2	7:20:01
6	(Greece) Acropolis Rally (2–4 June)	38 stages 575 km Gravel	2	(Italy) Miki Biasion	(Italy) Tiziano Siviero	(Italy) Martini Racing	Lancia Delta S4	7:21:38
6	(Greece) Acropolis Rally (2–4 June)	38 stages 575 km Gravel	3	(France) Bruno Saby	(France) Jean-François Fauchille	(France) Peugeot Talbot Sport	Peugeot 205 Turbo 16 E2	7:29:55
7	Rally New Zealand (5–8 July)	34 stages 597 km Gravel/Tarmac	1	(Finland) Juha Kankkunen	(Finland) Juha Piironen	(France) Peugeot Talbot Sport	Peugeot 205 Turbo 16 E2	5:43:45
7	Rally New Zealand (5–8 July)	34 stages 597 km Gravel/Tarmac	2	(Finland) Markku Alén	(Finland) Ilkka Kivimäki	(Italy) Martini Racing	Lancia Delta S4	5:45:25
7	Rally New Zealand (5–8 July)	34 stages 597 km Gravel/Tarmac	3	(Italy) Miki Biasion	(Italy) Tiziano Siviero	(Italy) Martini Racing	Lancia Delta S4	5:53:36
8	Rally Argentina (6–9 August)	26 stages 569 km Gravel	1	(Italy) Miki Biasion	(Italy) Tiziano Siviero	(Italy) Martini Racing	Lancia Delta S4	6:36:26
8	Rally Argentina (6–9 August)	26 stages 569 km Gravel	2	(Finland) Markku Alén	(Finland) Ilkka Kivimäki	(Italy) Martini Racing	Lancia Delta S4	6:36:50
8	Rally Argentina (6–9 August)	26 stages 569 km Gravel	3	(Sweden) Stig Blomqvist	(Sweden) Bruno Berglund	(France) Peugeot Talbot Sport	Peugeot 205 Turbo 16 E2	6:40:42
9	(Finland) 1000 Lakes Rally (5–7 September)	47 stages 382 km Gravel	1	(Finland) Timo Salonen	(Finland) Seppo Harjanne	(France) Peugeot Talbot Sport	Peugeot 205 Turbo 16 E2	3:32:45
9	(Finland) 1000 Lakes Rally (5–7 September)	47 stages 382 km Gravel	2	(Finland) Juha Kankkunen	(Finland) Juha Piironen	(France) Peugeot Talbot Sport	Peugeot 205 Turbo 16 E2	3:33:09
9	(Finland) 1000 Lakes Rally (5–7 September)	47 stages 382 km Gravel	3	(Finland) Markku Alén	(Finland) Ilkka Kivimäki	(Italy) Martini Racing	Lancia Delta S4	3:34:30
10	(Ivory Coast) Rallye Côte d'Ivoire (24–27 September)	73 controls 3763 km Gravel	1	(Sweden) Björn Waldegård	(United Kingdom) Fred Gallagher	(Japan) Toyota Team Europe	Toyota Celica TCT	+1:29 pen
10	(Ivory Coast) Rallye Côte d'Ivoire (24–27 September)	73 controls 3763 km Gravel	2	(Sweden) Lars-Erik Torph	(Sweden) Bo Thorszelius	(Japan) Toyota Team Europe	Toyota Celica TCT	+1:37 pen
10	(Ivory Coast) Rallye Côte d'Ivoire (24–27 September)	73 controls 3763 km Gravel	3	(West Germany) Erwin Weber	(West Germany) Günter Wanger	(Japan) Toyota Team Europe	Toyota Celica TCT	+2:27 pen
11	(Italy) Rallye Sanremo^{[1]} (13–17 October)	39 stages 488 km Gravel/Tarmac	1	(Finland) Markku Alén	(Finland) Ilkka Kivimäki	(Italy) Martini Racing	Lancia Delta S4	5:31:35
11	(Italy) Rallye Sanremo^{[1]} (13–17 October)	39 stages 488 km Gravel/Tarmac	2	(Italy) Dario Cerrato	(Italy) Giuseppe Cerri	(Italy) Martini Racing	Lancia Delta S4	5:32:53
11	(Italy) Rallye Sanremo^{[1]} (13–17 October)	39 stages 488 km Gravel/Tarmac	3	(Italy) Miki Biasion	(Italy) Tiziano Siviero	(Italy) Martini Racing	Lancia Delta S4	5:33:17
12	(United Kingdom) RAC Rally (16–19 November)	45 stages 517 km Gravel	1	(Finland) Timo Salonen	(Finland) Seppo Harjanne	(France) Peugeot Talbot Sport	Peugeot 205 Turbo 16 E2	5:21:11
12	(United Kingdom) RAC Rally (16–19 November)	45 stages 517 km Gravel	2	(Finland) Markku Alén	(Finland) Ilkka Kivimäki	(Italy) Martini Racing	Lancia Delta S4	5:22:33
12	(United Kingdom) RAC Rally (16–19 November)	45 stages 517 km Gravel	3	(Finland) Juha Kankkunen	(Finland) Juha Piironen	(France) Peugeot Talbot Sport	Peugeot 205 Turbo 16 E2	5:27:16
13	(United States) Olympus Rally (4–7 December)	39 stages 525 km Gravel	1	(Finland) Markku Alén	(Finland) Ilkka Kivimäki	(Italy) Martini Racing	Lancia Delta S4	5:26:10
13	(United States) Olympus Rally (4–7 December)	39 stages 525 km Gravel	2	(Finland) Juha Kankkunen	(Finland) Juha Piironen	(France) Peugeot Talbot Sport	Peugeot 205 Turbo 16 E2	5:29:36
13	(United States) Olympus Rally (4–7 December)	39 stages 525 km Gravel	3	(United States) John Buffum	(United Kingdom) Neil Wilson	(United States) Audi Of America	Audi Sport Quattro	5:50:24

^{1} FISA later annulled the results.

== Standings ==
=== Drivers' championship ===
Rank	Driver	Event													Total points
Rank	Driver	(Monaco) MON	(Sweden) SWE	(Portugal) POR	(Kenya) KEN	(France) FRA	(Greece) GRC	(New Zealand) NZL	(Argentina) ARG	(Finland) FIN	(Ivory Coast) CIV	(Italy) ITA	(United Kingdom) GBR	(United States) USA	Total points
1	(Finland) Juha Kankkunen	5	1	WD	5		1	1	Ret	2		*	3	2	118
2	(Finland) Markku Alén	Ret	2	WD	3	WD	Ret	2	2	3		*	2	1	104
3	(Finland) Timo Salonen	2	Ret	WD		Ret	Ret	5		1		*	1		63
4	(Sweden) Björn Waldegård				1						1	*		5	48
5	(Italy) Miki Biasion	Ret		WD	Ret	WD	2	3	1			*			47
6	(Sweden) Lars-Erik Torph				2						2	*		4	40
7	(France) Bruno Saby	6				1	3		Ret			*			38
8	(Sweden) Mikael Ericsson		4				Ret	4		5		*	Ret		28
9	(Sweden) Kalle Grundel		3	WD			Ret			6		*	5		26
10	(Sweden) Kenneth Eriksson	9	7	WD	Ret	8	7	7	5	12		*	11		25
11	(Sweden) Stig Blomqvist		Ret	WD			Ret		3	4		*	Ret		22
11	(West Germany) Erwin Weber				4						3	*			22
13	(Finland) Henri Toivonen	1	Ret	WD		Ret						*			20
13	(Portugal) Joaquim Moutinho			1								*			20
15	(Austria) Rudi Stohl	17		WD	Ret		6	12	6		7	*			16
16	(Portugal) Carlos Bica			2								*			15
16	(France) François Chatriot					2						*			15
18	(Finland) Hannu Mikkola	3										*			12
18	(Italy) Giovanni Del Zoppo	Ret		3		Ret	Ret					*			12
18	(France) Yves Loubet					3						*			12
18	(United States) John Buffum											*		3	12
22	(West Germany) Walter Röhrl	4		WD								*			10
22	(Portugal) Jorge Ortigão			4								*			10
22	(France) Jean Ragnotti					4						*			10
22	(Qatar) Saeed Al-Hajri						4					*			10
22	(Argentina) Jorge Recalde								4			*			10
22	(Kenya) Robin Ulyate										4	*			10
22	(Finland) Mikael Sundström									Ret		*	4		10
29	(Sweden) Gunnar Pettersson		5							Ret		*			8
29	(Monaco) Auguste Turiani	Ret		5			Ret					*			8
29	(France) Jean-Claude Torre					5						*			8
29	(Greece) Stratis Hatzipanayiotou						5					*			8
29	(Ivory Coast) Samir Assef										5	*			8
34	(Sweden) Per Eklund		Ret							7		*	7		8
35	(Austria) Franz Wittmann	10		WD	12	Ret	9		7			*			7
36	(France) Jean-Claude Andruet	Ret	6				Ret					*			6
36	(France) Jean-Sébastien Couloumiès			6								*			6
36	(Kenya) Mike Kirkland				6			Ret				*			6
36	(France) Paul Rouby					6						*			6
36	(New Zealand) Neil Allport							6				*			6
36	(Austria) Wilfried Wiedner										6	*			6
36	(United Kingdom) Tony Pond	Ret		WD		Ret						*	6		6
36	(Italy) Paolo Alessandrini											*		6	6
44	(New Zealand) Rod Millen							10				*		7	5
45	(Spain) Salvador Servià	7										*			4
45	(Portugal) Ramiro Fernandes			7								*			4
45	(Kenya) Frank Tundo				7			Ret				*			4
45	(France) Michel Neri					7						*			4
49	(France) Alain Oreille	8				Ret						*			3
49	(Sweden) Roger Ericsson		8									*			3
49	(Italy) Giovanni Recordati			8		Ret	19					*			3
49	(Kenya) Shekhar Mehta				8							*			3
49	(Greece) Iórgos Moschous						8					*			3
49	(New Zealand) Paddy Davidson							8				*			3
49	(Chile) José Celsi								8			*			3
49	(Finland) Harri Toivonen									8		*	Ret		3
49	(France) Alain Ambrosino										8	*			3
49	(United Kingdom) Jimmy McRae											*	8		3
49	(New Zealand) Possum Bourne				Ret			Ret				*		8	3
60	(Sweden) Björn Johansson		9									*			2
60	(Portugal) António Segurado			9								*			2
60	(Kenya) Greg Criticos				9							*			2
60	(France) Gilbert Casanova					9						*			2
60	(New Zealand) Reg Cook							9				*			2
60	(Argentina) Ernesto Soto								9			*			2
60	(Finland) Lasse Lampi									9		*			2
60	(France) Patrick Copetti										9	*			2
60	(United Kingdom) David Llewellin											*	9		2
60	(New Zealand) Clive Smith											*		9	2
70	(Sweden) Sören Nilsson		10									*			1
70	(Portugal) António Coutinho			10								*			1
70	(Kenya) Johnny Hellier				10							*			1
70	(France) Christian Gardavot					10						*			1
70	(Italy) Michele Rayneri	Ret		Ret		Ret	10					*			1
70	(Kenya) Basil Criticos				11				10			*			1
70	(United Kingdom) Malcolm Wilson	Ret	Ret	WD		Ret				10		*	17		1
70	(Ivory Coast) Martial Yacé										10	*			1
70	(Sweden) Ingvar Carlsson	Ret	Ret							Ret		*	10		1
70	(United States) Paul Choiniere											*		10	1
	(Czech Republic) Ladislav Krecek						12			26		*			0
	(Czech Republic) Svatopluk Kvaizar						14			37		*			0
	(Italy) Alex Fiorio	Ret		Ret		WD	Ret					*			0
	(France) Philippe Wambergue	Ret	Ret				Ret					*			0
	(France) Michele Mouton	Ret				Ret						*			0
	(Germany) Achim Warmbold	Ret										*			0
	(Portugal) Joaquim Santos			Ret								*			0
	(Tanzania) Jayant Shah				Ret							*			0
	(Kenya) Vic Preston Jr.				Ret							*			0
	(France) Didier Auriol					Ret						*			0
	(France) Maurice Chomat						Ret					*			0
	(New Zealand) Malcolm Stewart							Ret				*			0
	(France) Adolphe Choteau										Ret	*			0
	(Belgium) Marc Duez			WD								*	Ret		0
* - Note: FISA annulled the results for the Rallye Sanremo

=== Manufacturers' championship ===
Rank	Manufacturers	Event											Total points
Rank	Manufacturers	(Monaco) MON	(Sweden) SWE	(Portugal) POR	(Kenya) KEN	(France) FRA	(Greece) GRC	(New Zealand) NZL	(Argentina) ARG	(Finland) FIN	(Italy) ITA	(United Kingdom) GBR	Total points
1	(France) Peugeot	17	20	-	(10)	20	20	20	(14)	20	*	20	137
2	(Italy) Lancia	20	17	-	(14)	-	17	17	20	14	*	17	122
3	(West Germany) Volkswagen	9	10	-	-	9	11	12	14	-	*	-	65
4	(West Germany) Audi	14	15	-	-	-	-	-	-	-	*	-	29
5	(United Kingdom) Ford	-	14	-	-	-	-	-	-	-	*	10	24
6	(Japan) Toyota	-	-	-	20	-	-	-	-	-	*	-	20
7	(France) Renault	-	-	-	-	14	-	-	-	-	*	-	14
8	(Japan) Subaru	-	-	-	13	-	-	-	-	-	*	-	13
9	(United Kingdom) Austin Rover	-	-	-	-	-	-	-	-	4	*	8	12
10	(France) Citroën	-	10	-	-	-	-	-	-	-	*	-	10
11	(Japan) Mazda	-	-	-	-	-	-	-	-	-	*	9	9
12	(West Germany) Opel	-	-	-	-	-	-	-	5	-	*	-	5
* - Note: FISA annulled the results for the Sanremo Rally

== Pointscoring systems ==
=== Drivers' championship ===
Points awarded by finish	1st	2nd	3rd	4th	5th	6th	7th	8th	9th	10th
Points awarded by finish	20	15	12	10	8	6	4	3	2	1

=== Manufacturers' championship ===
Points awarded by overall finish	1st	2nd	3rd	4th	5th	6th	7th	8th	9th	10th
Points awarded by overall finish	12	10	8	7	6	5	4	3	2	1

Points awarded by group finish	1st	2nd	3rd	4th	5th	6th	7th	8th
Points awarded by group finish	8	7	6	5	4	3	2	1
