= Joaquim Santos =

Portuguese rally driver (1952–2024)

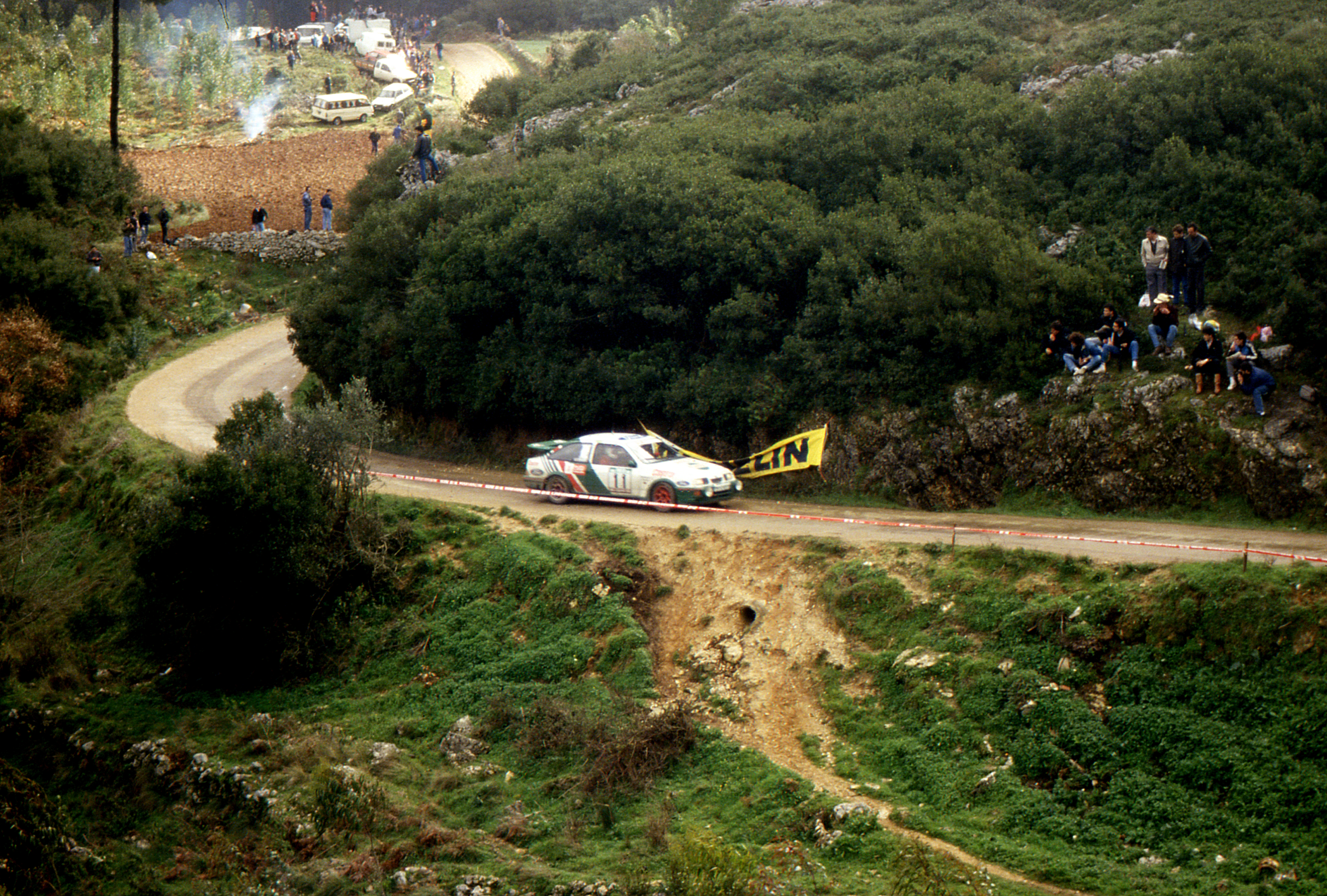
- Santos driving a Ford Sierra RS Cosworth in the 1989 Rallye de Portugal

Personal information
- Nationality: (Portugal) Portuguese
- Born: 9 June 1952; Penafiel, Portugal
- Died: 18 March 2024 (aged 71)

World Rally Championship record
- Years active: 1976–1980, 1982–1992
- Co-driver: (Portugal) Jorge Lopes (Portugal) Luís Alegria (Portugal) Teófila Tuna (Portugal) Albino Tristão (Portugal) Pompeu Moutinho (Portugal) Miguel Oliveira (Portugal) Carlos Magalhães
- Teams: Ford
- Rallies: 16
- Championships: 0
- Rally wins: 0
- Podiums: 0
- Stage wins: 27
- Total points: 10
- First rally: 1976 Rallye de Portugal
- Last rally: 1992 Rallye de Portugal

Joaquim Coelho da Rocha Santos (9 June 1952 – 18 March 2024) was a Portuguese rally driver.

== Biography ==
Born in Penafiel on 9 June 1952, Santos raced from the 1970s to the 1990s. He began his career at city circuits, winning the Austin Mini trophy in a Ford Fiesta 1300. He also did rallycross with his brother, Fernando, taking part in truck races in Lousada and winning the Toyota Starlet trophy. He also raced in a BMW, a Datsun, and an Opel Kadett. In 1986, his accident in a Ford RS200 in Sintra resulted in the deaths of three spectators. The race was eventually won by Joaquim Moutinho.

Santos died on 18 March 2024, at the age of 71.

== Racing record ==
=== Complete WRC results ===
Year	Entrant	Car	1	2	3	4	5	6	7	8	9	10	11	12	13	14	WDC	Points
1976	Joaquim Santos	Datsun 1200	MON	SWE	POR; 11	KEN	GRE	MOR	FIN	ITA	FRA	GBR					N/A	N/A
1977	Joaquim Santos	Datsun 1200	MON	SWE	POR; Ret	KEN	NZL	GRC	FIN	CAN	ITA	FRA	GBR				N/A	N/A
1978	Joaquim Santos	Datsun 1200	MON	SWE	KEN	POR; Ret	GRE	FIN	CAN	ITA	CIV	FRA	GBR				N/A	N/A
1979	Team Lopes Correia	Opel Kadett GT/E	MON	SWE	POR; 8	KEN	GRE	NZL	FIN	CAN	ITA	FRA	GBR	CIV			54th	3
1980	Proloco	Opel Ascona SR	MON	SWE	POR; Ret	KEN	GRC	ARG	FIN	NZL	ITA	FRA	GBR	CIV			NC	0
1982	Diabolique Motorsport	Ford Escort RS1800	MON	SWE	POR; Ret	KEN	FRA	GRC	NZL	BRA	FIN	ITA	CIV	GBR			NC	0
1983	Diabolique Motorsport	Ford Escort RS1800	MON	SWE	POR; 9	KEN	FRA	GRC	NZL	ARG	FIN	ITA	CIV	GBR			NC	0
1984	Diabolique Motorsport	Ford Escort RS1800	MON	SWE	POR; Ret	KEN	FRA	GRE	NZL	ARG	FIN	ITA	CIV	GBR			NC	0
1985	Diabolique Motorsport	Ford Escort RS1600i	MON	SWE	POR; 13	KEN	FRA	GRC	NZL	ARG	FIN	ITA	CIV	GBR			NC	0
1986	Ford Motor Company Ltd.	Ford RS200	MON	SWE	POR; Ret	KEN	FRA	GRE	NZL	ARG	FIN	CIV	ITA	GBR	USA		NC	0
1987	Diabolique Motorsport	Ford Sierra RS Cosworth	MON	SWE	POR; 9	KEN	FRA	GRE	USA	NZL	ARG	FIN	CIV	ITA	GBR		58th	2
1988	Diabolique Motorsport	Ford Sierra RS Cosworth	MON	SWE	POR; Ret	KEN	FRA	GRC	USA	NZL	ARG	FIN	CIV	ITA	GBR		NC	0
1989	Diabolique Motorsport	Ford Sierra RS Cosworth	SWE	MON	POR; Ret	KEN	FRA	GRC	NZL	ARG	FIN	AUS	ITA	CIV	GBR		NC	0
1990	Diabolique Motorsport	Ford Sierra RS Cosworth	MON	POR; 9	KEN	FRA	GRC	NZL	ARG	FIN	AUS	ITA	CIV	GBR			54th	2
1991	Team Salvador Caetano	Toyota Celica GT-Four ST165	MON	SWE	POR; Ret	KEN	FRA	GRE	NZL	ARG	FIN	AUS	ITA	CIV	ESP	GBR	NC	0
1992	Adventure Boots / Toyota-Mobil	Toyota Celica GT-Four ST165	MON	SWE	POR; 8	KEN	FRA	GRE	NZL	ARG	FIN	AUS	ITA	CIV	ESP	GBR	49th	3
