= Joaquim Moutinho =

Portuguese rally driver (1951–2019)

Personal information
- Nationality: (Portugal) Portuguese
- Born: 14 December 1951; Porto
- Died: 22 November 2019 (aged 67)

World Rally Championship record
- Years active: 1973, 1978–1981, 1984–1986
- Co-driver: (Portugal) Edgar Fortes (Portugal) Miguel Sottomayor (Portugal) Pina de Morais
- Teams: British Leyland Portugal; Arbö; Team Lopes Correia; Proloco; Team Miura; Renault Galp
- Rallies: 8
- Championships: 0
- Rally wins: 1
- Podiums: 1
- Stage wins: 27
- Total points: 22
- First rally: 1973 Rally de Portugal
- First win: 1986 Rally de Portugal
- Last rally: 1986 Rally de Portugal

Joaquim Moutinho da Silva Santos (14 December 1951 – 22 November 2019) was a Portuguese rally driver, who in 1986 won the Rally de Portugal, a round of the World Rally Championship. Moutinho, who was born in Porto, was also a champion in the Portuguese Touring Car Championship and Portuguese Rally Championship.

== Career ==
Moutinho participated mainly in the Portuguese Rally Championship, which he won in 1985 and 1986 in a Renault 5 Turbo. He took part in the Rally de Portugal nine times between 1973 and 1986. He finished ninth in 1981 in an Opel Kadett GT/E. Moutinho won the 1986 event following the accident of compatriot Joaquim Santos that killed three spectators. All of the factory teams withdrew from the event, allowing Moutinho to win the rally. It would be his final WRC event.

Moutinho also competed regularly in the Portuguese Touring Car Championship (CNV). He missed out on fighting for the title in 1980 due to repeated mechanical failures, but won the B2 class in 1981 in a heavily modified Group 5 Porsche 911.

== WRC victories ==
#	Event	Season	Co-driver	Car
1	20º Rallye de Portugal Vinho do Porto	1986	Edgar Fortes	Renault 5 Turbo

== Complete WRC results ==
Year	Entrant	Car	1	2	3	4	5	6	7	8	9	10	11	12	13	WDC	Points
1973	British Leyland Portugal	Austin Maxi 1750	MON	SWE	POR; Ret	KEN	MOR	GRE	POL	FIN	AUT	ITA	USA	GBR	FRA	N/A	N/A
1978	Arbö	Opel Kadett GT/E	MON	SWE	KEN	POR; Ret	GRE	FIN	CAN	ITA	CIV	FRA	GBR			N/A	N/A
1979	Team Lopes Correia	Ford Escort RS2000	MON	SWE	POR; Ret	KEN	GRE	NZL	FIN	CAN	ITA	FRA	GBR	CIV		NC	0
1980	Proloco	Ford Escort RS2000	MON	SWE	POR; Ret	KEN	GRC	ARG	FIN	NZL	ITA	FRA	GBR	CIV		NC	0
1981	Team Miura	Opel Kadett GT/E	MON	SWE	POR; 9	KEN	FRA	GRC	ARG	BRA	FIN	ITA	CIV	GBR		56th	2
1984	Renault Galp	Renault 5 Turbo	MON	SWE	POR; Ret	KEN	FRA	GRE	NZL	ARG	FIN	ITA	CIV	GBR		NC	0
1985	Renault Galp	Renault 5 Turbo	MON	SWE	POR; Ret	KEN	FRA	GRC	NZL	ARG	FIN	ITA	CIV	GBR		NC	0
1986	Renault Galp	Renault 5 Turbo	MON	SWE	POR; 1	KEN	FRA	GRE	NZL	ARG	FIN	CIV	ITA	GBR	USA	13th	20
