= Kalle Grundel =

Swedish rally driver (born 1948)

Personal information
- Nationality: (Sweden) Swedish
- Born: 2 October 1948 (age 78)

World Rally Championship record
- Years active: 1976–1988
- Co-driver: (Sweden) Leif Lindberg (Sweden) Tommy Andersson (Sweden) Lennart Söderberg (Sweden) Rolf Melleroth (West Germany) Reinhard Michel (West Germany) Peter Diekmann (United Kingdom) Terry Harryman (Sweden) Benny Melander (Sweden) Christian Bodén (Sweden) Johnny Johansson
- Teams: Volkswagen, Peugeot, Ford, Lancia
- Rallies: 32
- Rally wins: 0
- Podiums: 1
- Stage wins: 14
- Total points: 61
- First rally: 1976 Swedish Rally
- Last rally: 1988 RAC Rally

Karl-Erik "Kalle" Grundel (born 2 October 1948) is a Swedish former rally driver and military pilot. He made his international breakthrough in 1982, driving a Volkswagen Golf GTi for Volkswagen's factory team. He achieved his first and only podium finish in the World Rally Championship in 1986, steering his Ford RS200 to third place in the Swedish Rally.

== Complete WRC results ==
Year	Entrant	Car	1	2	3	4	5	6	7	8	9	10	11	12	13	WDC	Points
1976	Huddinge MK	Volkswagen Golf LS	MON	SWE ?	POR	KEN	GRC	MOR	FIN	ITA	FRA	GBR				N/A	N/A
1977	Huddinge MK	Saab 99 EMS	MON	SWE; Ret	POR	KEN	NZL	GRC	FIN	CAN	ITA	FRA				N/A	N/A
1977	Kalle Grundel	Saab 99 EMS											GBR; 32			N/A	N/A
1978	Huddinge MK	Saab 96 V4	MON	SWE; Ret	KEN	POR	GRC	FIN	CAN	ITA	CIV	FRA	GBR			N/A	N/A
1979	Kalle Grundel	Saab 96 V4	MON	SWE; Ret	POR	KEN	GRC	NZL	FIN	CAN	ITA	FRA	GBR	CIV		NC	0
1980	Saab Sport & Rally Team	Saab 96 V4	MON	SWE; Ret	POR	KEN	GRC	ARG	FIN	NZL	ITA	FRA				NC	0
1980	Saab Sport & Rally Team	Saab 99 Turbo											GBR; Ret	CIV		NC	0
1981	Saab Sport & Rally Team	Saab 99 Turbo	MON	SWE; Ret	POR	KEN	FRA	GRC	ARG	BRA	FIN	ITA	CIV	GBR		NC	0
1982	Volkswagen Motorsport Sweden	Volkswagen Golf GTI	MON	SWE; 8	POR	KEN	FRA	GRC	NZL	BRA	FIN	ITA	CIV	GBR		49th	3
1983	Volkswagen Motorsport Sweden	Volkswagen Golf GTI	MON	SWE; 5	POR	KEN	FRA	GRC	NZL	ARG	FIN	ITA	CIV			16th	11
1983	Volkswagen Motorsport	Volkswagen Golf GTI												GBR; 8		16th	11
1984	Volkswagen Motorsport	Volkswagen Golf GTI	MON; 9	SWE; Ret	POR; 7	KEN	FRA; 13	GRC; Ret	NZL	ARG	FIN; Ret	ITA; 6	CIV	GBR; Ret		18th	12
1985	Peugeot Talbot Sport	Peugeot 205 Turbo 16 E2	MON	SWE	POR	KEN	FRA	GRC	NZL	ARG	FIN; 5	ITA	CIV	GBR; Ret		25th	8
1986	Ford Motor Company Ltd	Ford RS200	MON	SWE; 3	POR; WD	KEN	FRA	GRE; Ret	NZL	ARG				GBR; 5	USA	9th	26
1986	Martini Lancia	Lancia Delta S4									FIN; 6	CIV	ITA			9th	26
1987	Ford Motor Company Ltd	Ford Sierra RS Cosworth	MON; 84				FRA; Ret	GRC	USA	NZL	ARG	FIN	CIV	ITA		NC	0
1987	Ford Motor Company Ltd	Ford Sierra XR 4x4		SWE; Ret	POR	KEN										NC	0
1987	Peugeot Talbot Sport	Peugeot 205 GTI													GBR; Ret	NC	0
1988	Rallysport Sweden	Mazda 323 4WD	MON	SWE; Ret	POR	KEN	FRA	GRC	USA	NZL	ARG	FIN	CIV	ITA		83rd	1
1988	Peugeot Talbot Sport	Peugeot 309 GTI													GBR; 10	83rd	1
