= Renault 5 Turbo =

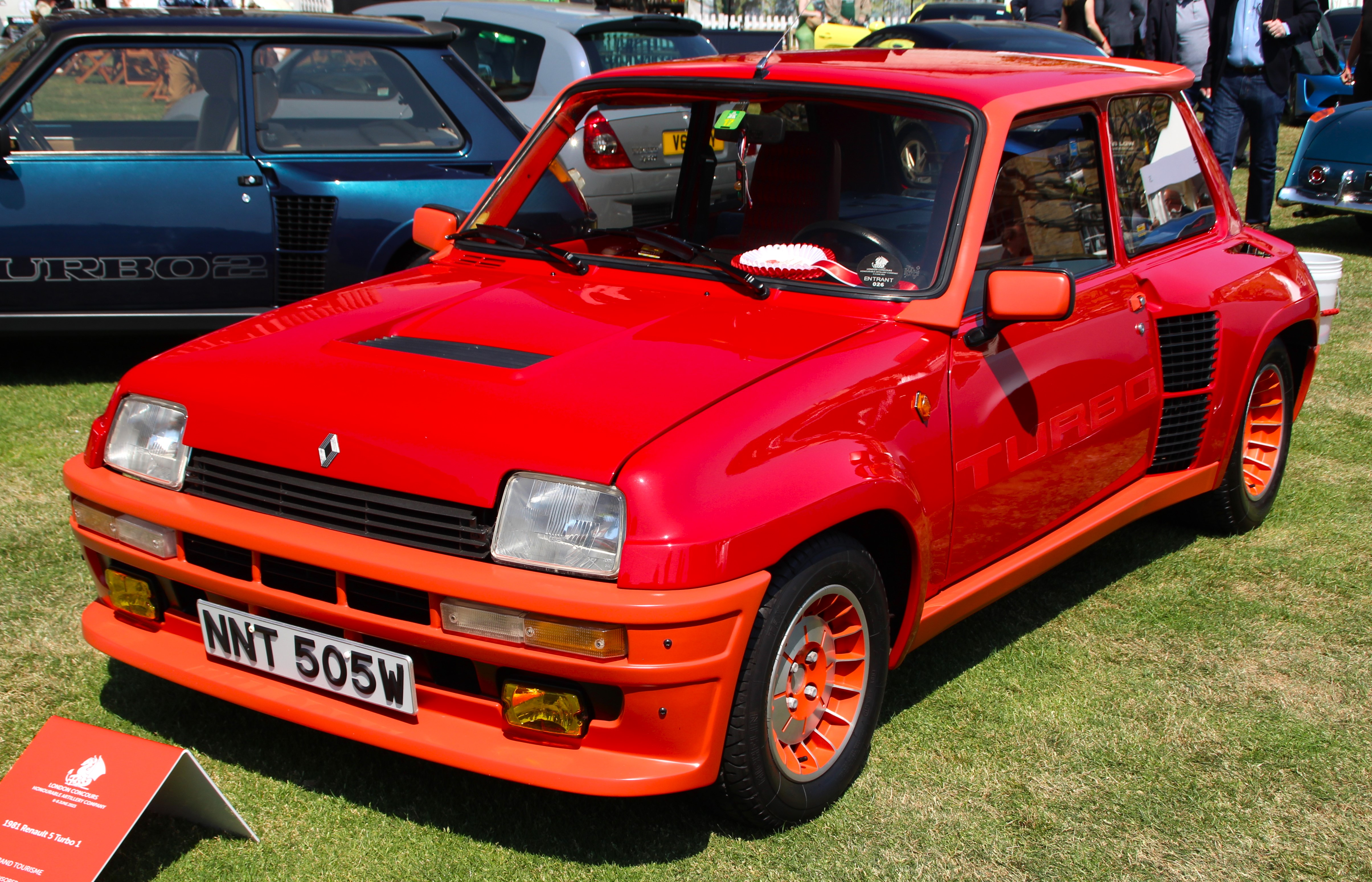

Overview
- Manufacturer: Renault
- Production: 1980–1984
- Assembly: France: Dieppe (Alpine)
- Designer: Marc Deschamps; Marcello Gandini at Bertone (interiors)

Body and chassis
- Class: Sport compact
- Body style: 3-door hatchback
- Layout: RMR layout
- Related: Renault 5

Powertrain
- Engine: 1.4 L C6J turbo I4; 1.5 L C7K turbo I4 (Maxi)
- Transmission: 5-speed type 369 manual

Dimensions
- Wheelbase: 2,430 mm (95.7 in)
- Length: 3,660 mm (144.1 in)
- Width: 1,750 mm (68.9 in)
- Height: 1,320 mm (52.0 in)
- Curb weight: 970 kg (2,138 lb)

Chronology
- Successor: Renault Clio V6 Renault Sport

The Renault 5 Turbo or R5 Turbo is a sports car which was produced by French manufacturer Renault from 1980 until 1984. It has a rear mid-engine, rear-wheel-drive layout and was originally designed as a homologation special to compete in rallying. The R5 Turbo is based on the Renault 5, a front-wheel-drive mass-market supermini. Launched at the Brussels Motor Show in January 1980, the car was sold in a street-legal version, to comply with homologation minimum production numbers regulations, certifying that the R5 Turbo was to a sufficient extent indeed a "production car".

Despite a hefty price-tag, market demand for the Renault 5 Turbos exceeded the required homologation production minimums, such that a total of 4,987 (1,820 Turbo 1 and 3,167 Turbo 2) R5 Turbos were manufactured during the six-year production run.

== Design ==
In response to Lancia's rallying success with the mid-engined Stratos, Renault's Jean Terramorsi, vice-president of production came up with the idea of creating a new sports version of the Renault 5 Alpine supermini. The distinctive new rear bodywork was styled by Marc Deschamps at Bertone, headed by Chief Designer Marcello Gandini. A Renault 5 Alpine was sent to Bertone in October 1977 to be used as a "mannequin." The car's code name was Projet 822.

Although the standard Renault 5 has a front-mounted engine, the 5 Turbo featured a mid-mounted 1,397 cc (1.4 L; 85.3 cu in) Cléon-Fonte with fuel fed by Bosch K-Jetronic fuel injection and a Garrett AiResearch T3 turbocharger OHV 2 valves per cylinder Inline-four engine placed behind the driver in mid-body in a modified Renault 5 chassis. In standard form, the engine developed 160 PS (158 hp; 118 kW) at 6000 rpm and maximum torque of 221 N⋅m (163 lb⋅ft) at 3250 rpm.

Though it used a modified body from a standard Renault 5 and was badged a Renault 5, the mechanicals were radically different. The most obvious difference was the rear-wheel drive and rear-mid engine instead of the normal version's front-wheel drive and front-mounted engine. The engineers creating the Turbo used parts from various other Renault models: the rear suspension was derived from that of the rear-engined Renault Alpine A310 V6 while the five-speed manual transmission was the unit from the Renault 30 TX, rotated through 180 degrees. At the time of its launch, it was the most powerful French production car. In side profile, the R5 Turbo looked largely the same as any other 2-door Renault 5 of the contemporaneous first generation, sharing the same greenhouse, rear hatch and doors shape, as well as a very similar looking nose, featuring only design tweaks typical of a sporty model, like a low front spoiler, wider front wheels and tires, widened fender flares to accommodate these, and side skirts that continued from the front airdam. But any similarities with a regular Renault 5 ended there.

Instead of the rear bench-seat is the engine compartment, housing a turbo-charged engine, far more powerful than in any other R5, longitudinally mounted ahead of the gearbox, driving a pair of very wide rear wheels, housed in rear quarter panels, widened by 11.25 cm (4.4 in), featuring near full-height air-intake grilles on their leading edges, as well as hot air exit vents to the left and right of the respective (standard) tail-light units. Behind the engine compartment, a surprisingly usable luggage compartment was, as usual, accessible through the rear hatch. The nose of the car, however lost much of its function. The now wider spare wheel stayed under the hood, and air entering through the front grille was let out via vents in the bonnet, perhaps adding some downforce.

In the interior remained only two sporty front bucket seats, and occupants faced an avant-garde restyled dashboard, including an asymmetrical steering wheel. Series one units were typically red with blue interior upholstery. The alternative was the reverse.

The first 400 production 5 Turbos were made to comply with Group 4 homologation to allow the car to compete in international rallies, and were manufactured at the Alpine factory in Dieppe. Many parts later transferred to the Alpine A310, such as the suspension or alloy wheel set.

=== Renault 5 Turbo 2 ===
Renault 5 Turbo 2
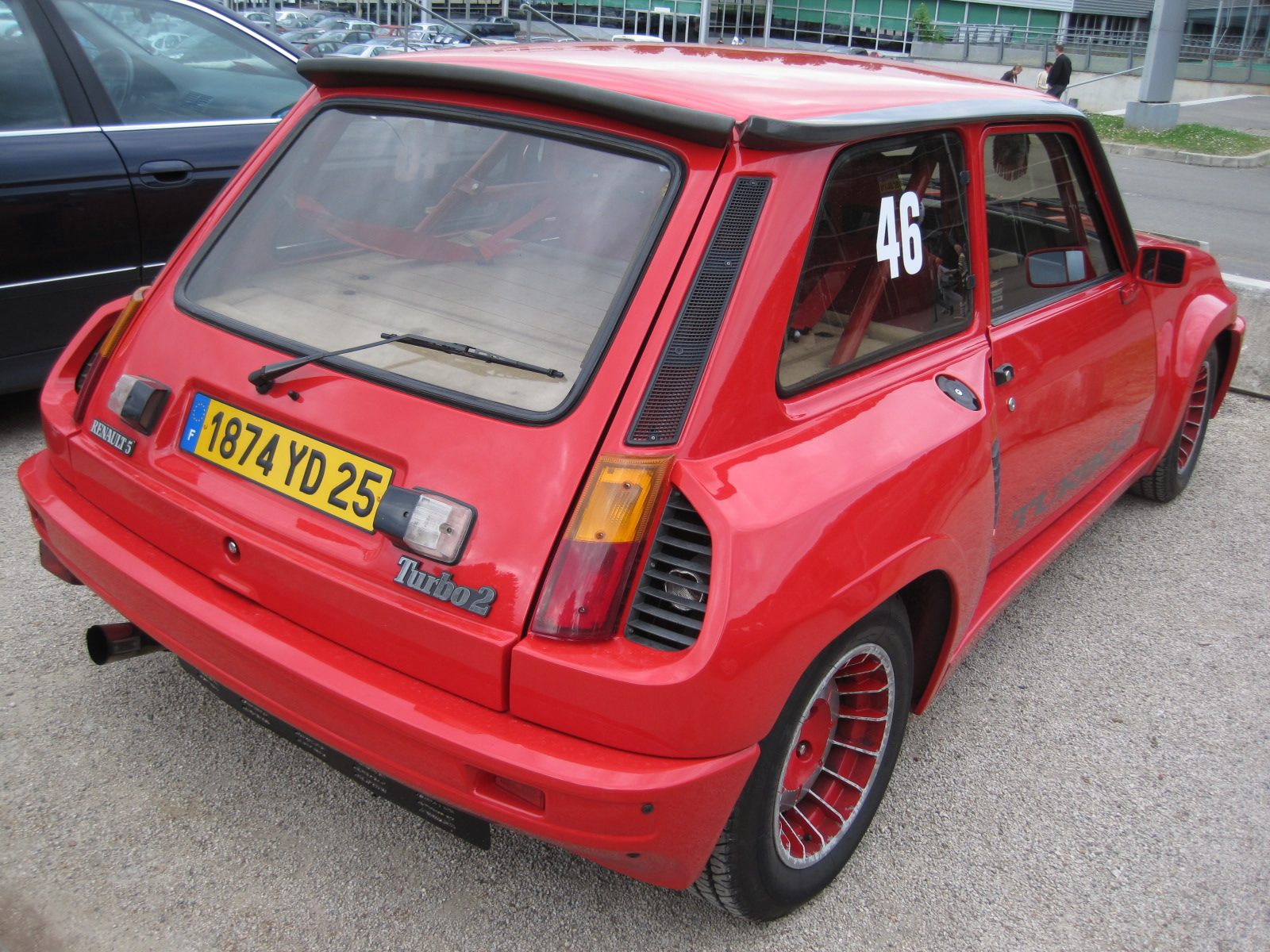
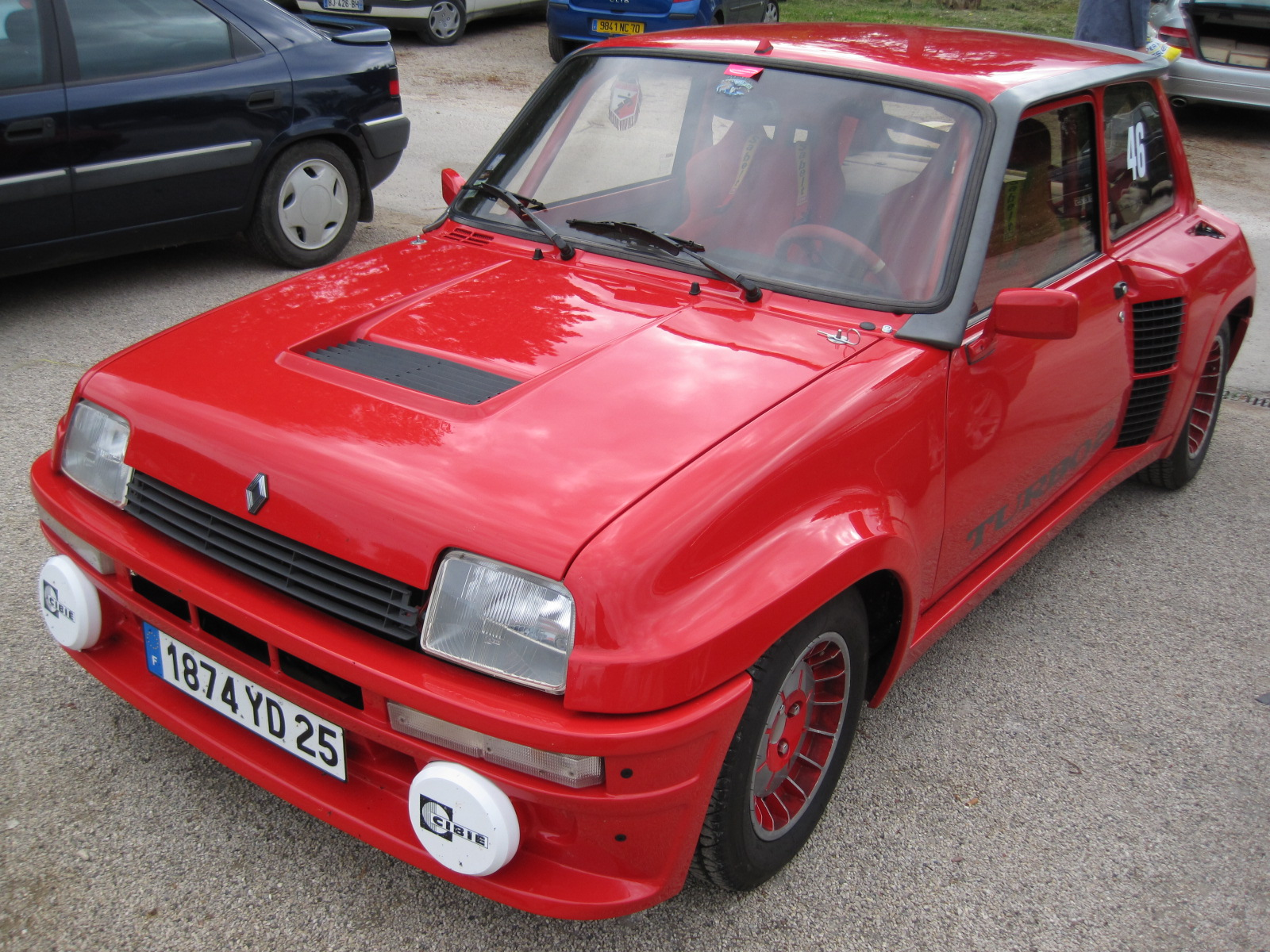

Once the homologation models were produced, a second version named Turbo 2 was introduced using more standard Renault 5 parts replacing many of the light-alloy components in the original 5 Turbo version, and dropping the specific Bertone seats and dashboard for the interior of the R5 Alpine. Many parts also became dark grey rather than the iconic red or blue.

The Turbo 2 was cheaper but had nearly the same levels of performance, with a top speed of 200 km/h (120 mph) and 0–100 km/h (62 mph) in 6.9 seconds. To differentiate it from the Turbo 2, the original 5 Turbo is often referred as "Turbo 1".

Although the Turbo 2 is not known as a Homologation special, 200 cars were made to homologate the car for the new Group B class. Known by the '8221' number in the chassis VIN, these featured an alloy-roof, a larger 1437cc engine, as well as a range of additional aerodynamic and geometry changes which allowed them to homologate the car that would compete against the Lancia 037 and the Audi Quattro in Group B rally class.

The concept of a mid-engined small Renault returned with the 1998 announcement of the Renault Clio V6.

== North America ==
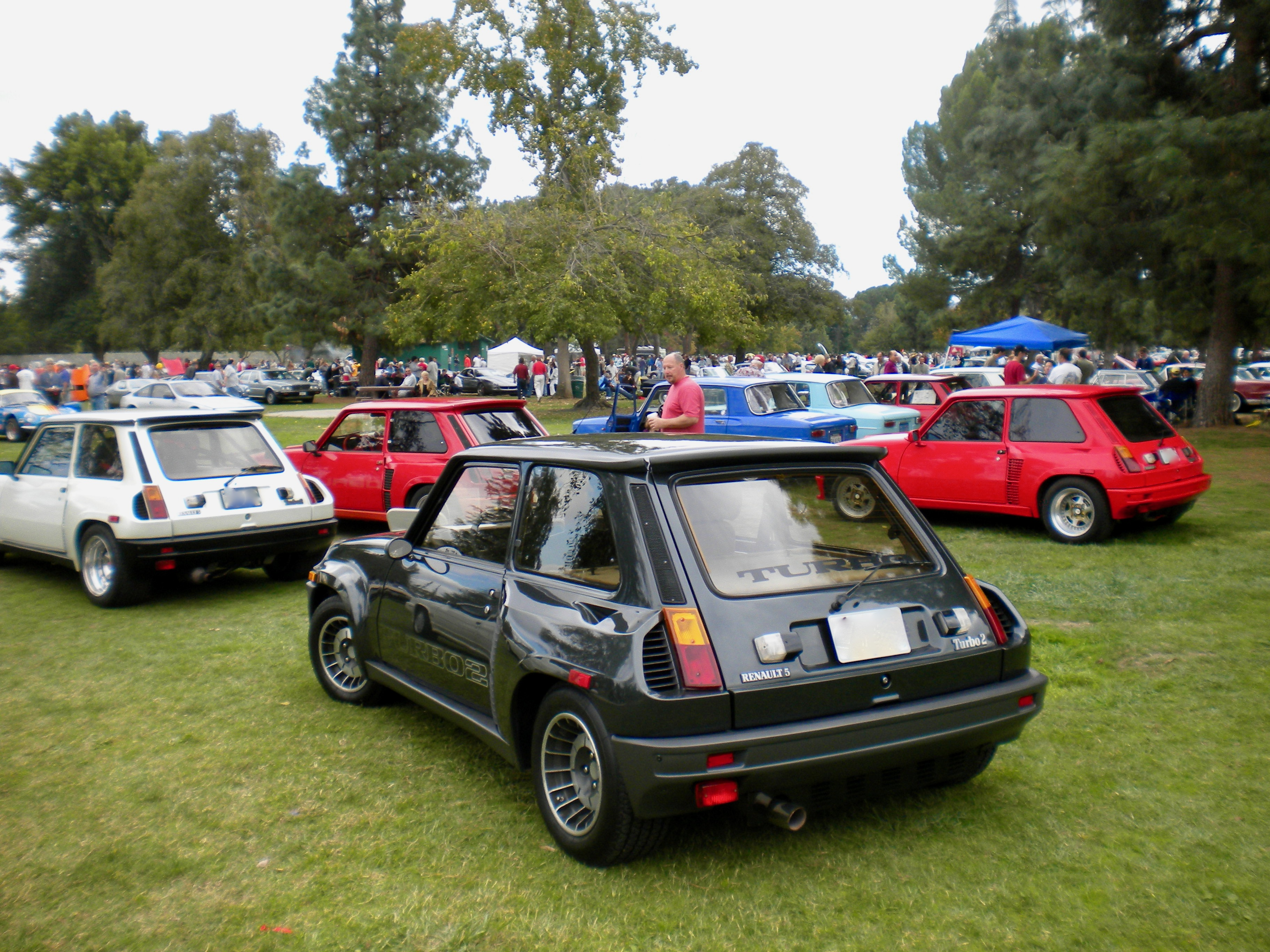
Grey Market R5 Turbo 2's in United States

The original plan called for 1,000 Renault 5 Turbo cars to be built to meet the requirements for Group 3 homologation, with an eye to building an additional 3,000 factory U.S. Models for sale in the United States. This did not actually happen.

Instead the vehicle was available to Americans via the burgeoning grey market (1976–1988), in which European street legal cars were converted to U.S. specifications.

== Awards ==
In 2004, Sports Car International named the R5 Turbo number nine on the list of Top Sports Cars of the 1980s.

== Motorsport ==
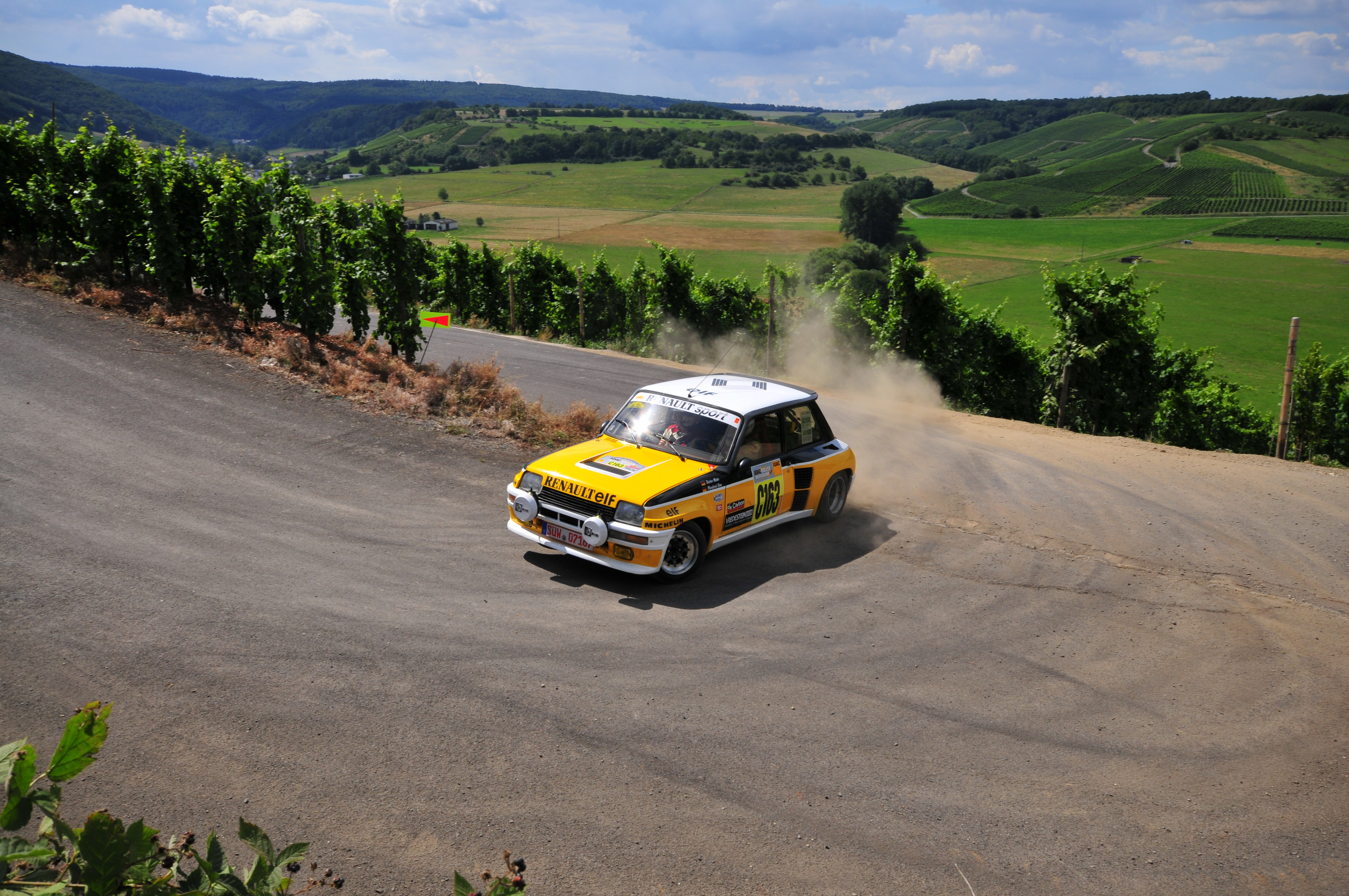
R5 Turbo rally version

The R5 Turbo was conceived with dual intent, promoting the sales of the common R5 and being homologated in the FIA group 3 and 4 categories of the rally championship (today WRC). All the motorsport derivatives were based on the Turbo 1.

The factory pushed the engine output up to 180 PS (132 kW; 178 hp) for the Critérium des Cévennes, 210 PS (154 kW; 207 hp) for the Tour de Corse, and by 1984 as much as 350 PS (257 kW; 345 hp) in the R5 Maxi Turbo. The final Renault 5 Maxi Turbo Superproduction reached 385 PS (283 kW; 380 hp) and won the 1987 French Supertouring Championship that year.

The Renault 5 Turbo competed in the sub-2000 cc category, thanks to the multiplication factor of 1.4 which was applied to turbocharged engines. FISA restricted tire and wheel sizes based on engine size, so for the Maxi Turbo, Renault enlarged to engine to 1527 cc which brought it up to 2138 cc in the eyes of the regulatory agencies - placing it in the 2000–2500 cc category and allowing for the fitment of wider wheels at the expense of a higher minimum weight.

Driven by Jean Ragnotti in 1981, the 5 Turbo won the Monte Carlo Rally on its first outing in the World Rally Championship. The 2WD R5 Turbo soon faced the competition of new Group B four-wheel drive cars that proved faster on dirt.

== WRC victories ==
Renault 5 Maxi Turbo being demonstrated by Jean Ragnotti

There are several victories throughout the early 1980s in the national championships in France, Portugal, Switzerland, Hungary, and Spain, as well as victories in international rallies throughout Europe, with wins in iconic rallies such as Monte Carlo.

After the factory ceased support, it underwent development by many teams and enthusiasts to compete in regional championships and local races in which it was ubiquitous and successful for almost 20 years.

Later, the newly created historical categories allowed these celebrated cars to return to international events and competitions.

No.	Event	Season	Driver	Co-driver	Car
1	(Monaco) 49ème Rallye Automobile de Monte-Carlo	1981	(France) Jean Ragnotti	(France) Jean-Marc Andrié	Renault 5 Turbo
2	(France) 26éme Tour de Corse	1982	(France) Jean Ragnotti	(France) Jean-Marc Andrié	Renault 5 Turbo
3	(France) 29ème Tour De Corse	1985	(France) Jean Ragnotti	(France) Pierre Thimonier	Renault R5 Maxi Turbo
4	20º Rallye de Portugal Vinho do Porto	1986	(Portugal) Joaquim Moutinho	(Portugal) Edgar Fortes	Renault 5 Turbo
