= Renault Clio V6 RS =

Renault Clio V6 Renault Sport
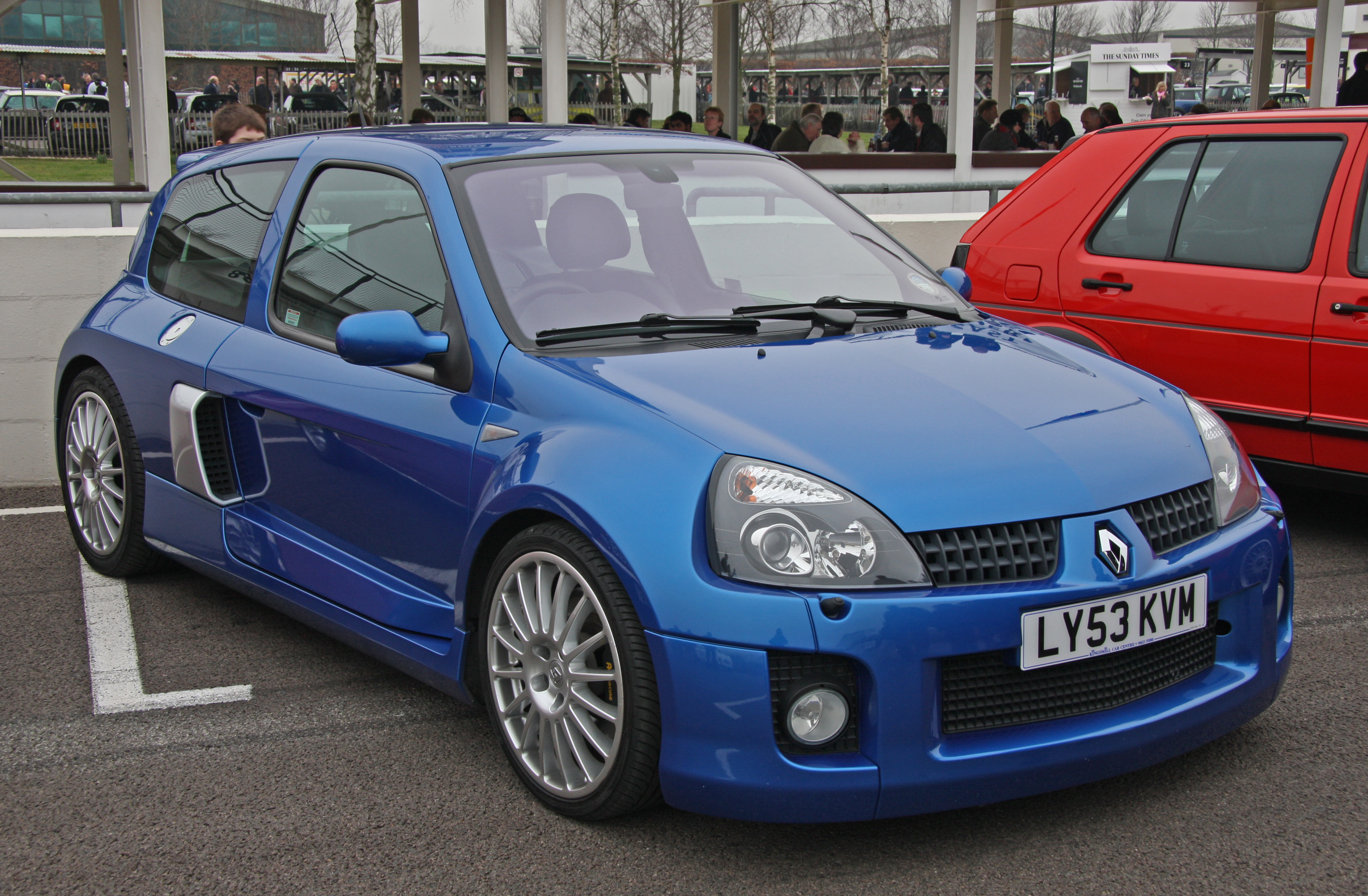
- Renault Clio V6 Phase 2

Overview
- Manufacturer: Renault Sport
- Also called: Renault Clio V6; Renault Lutécia Sport V6 (Japan)
- Production: 2001–2005
- Assembly: Sweden: Uddevalla (TWR: Phase 1); France: Dieppe (Alpine: Phase 2)

Body and chassis
- Class: Supermini car (B)
- Body style: 3-door hatchback
- Layout: Rear mid-engine, rear-wheel-drive
- Related: Renault Clio Sport

Powertrain
- Engine: PSA 2.9 L (2,946 cc) L7X V6 24v
- Transmission: 6-speed manual

Dimensions
- Wheelbase: Phase 2 – 2,530 mm (99.6 in) Phase 1 – 2,510 mm (98.8 in)
- Length: 3,830 mm (150.8 in)
- Width: 1,940 mm (76.4 in)
- Height: 1,420 mm (55.9 in)
- Curb weight: Phase 1 – 1,355 kg (2,987 lb) Phase 2 – 1,400 kg (3,086 lb)

Chronology
- Predecessor: Renault 5 Turbo
- Successor: Renault 5 Turbo 3E

The Renault Clio V6 RS (alternatively Renault Clio V6) is a rear mid-engine, rear-wheel-drive layout hot hatch based on the Renault Clio launched in 2001. Designed by French automaker Renault the Phase 1 models were built by Tom Walkinshaw Racing (TWR) in Uddevalla, Sweden and Phase 2 were designed and hand built by Renault Sport in Dieppe, France. Both variants were developed by TWR. The mid-engined, wide-body concept of the Clio V6 was very reminiscent of the 1980s Renault 5 Turbo. Both road going models were low volume production making them very rare cars. Alongside the road car, a circuit only version was produced, known as the Clio V6 Trophy. This was a full competition car, with sequential Sadev gearbox, full roll cage, magnesium wheels and engine output upped to 285 PS (210 kW; 281 bhp).

== Clio V6 Trophy (1999–2003) ==
The Trophy is a competition car built in Renaultsports' Dieppe facility. Built as a single make series competition car to promote the new Clio 2 range, the Clio V6 Trophy series replaced the Renaultsport Spider Trophy, which finished in 1998. Starting with the shell of a front wheel drive standard Clio, the cars were completely reworked to house a 3–litre V6 engine (derived from the PSA group engine used in the Renault Laguna). The race cars inspired the construction of a road going car, which resulted in the Clio V6 released in 2001. Whilst it bears a striking resemblance to the road cars, it was completely different, only sharing very minor body parts.

There were 159 cars built between 1999 and 2003.

== Clio V6 Phase 1 (2001–2003) ==
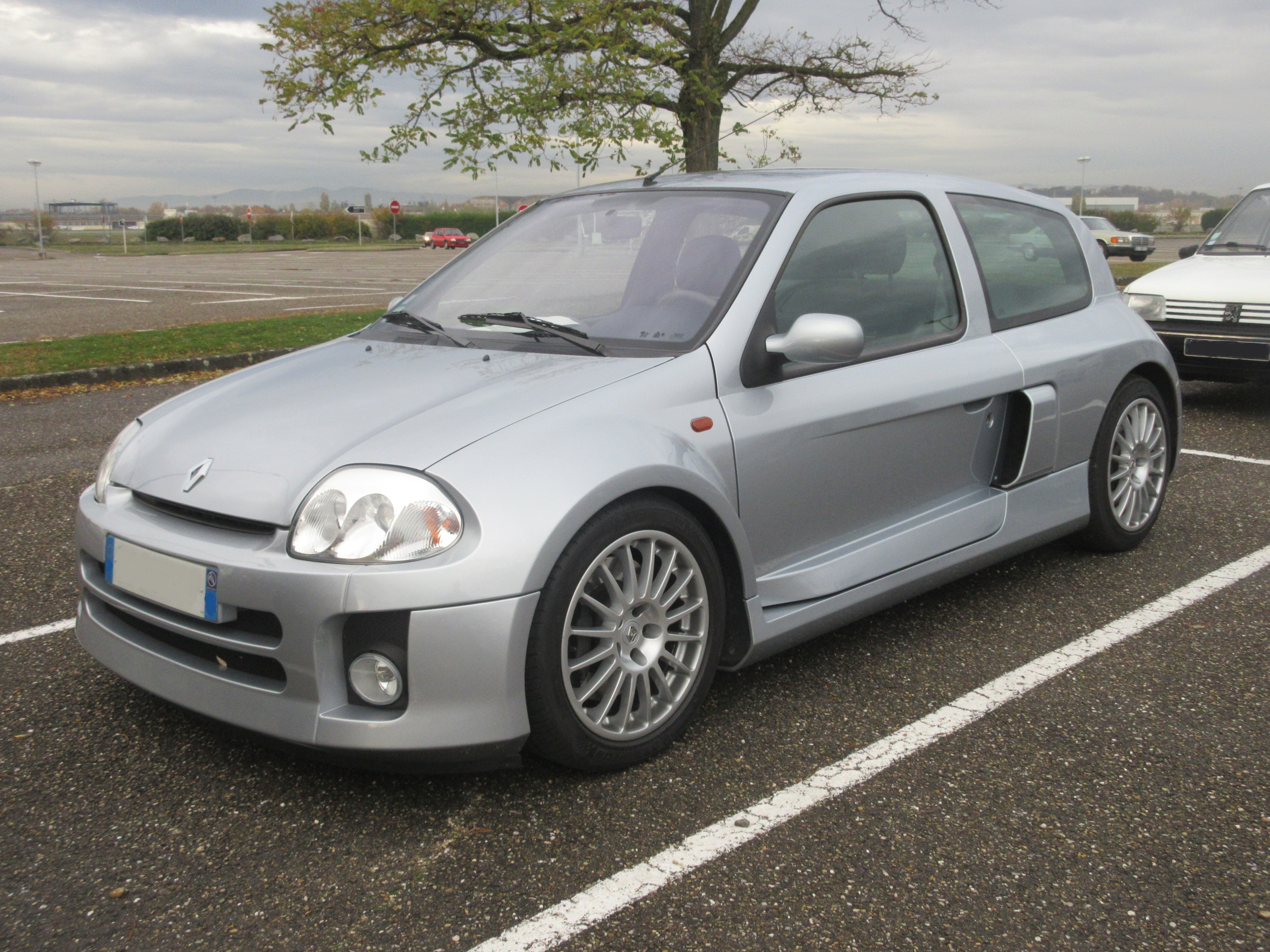
Renault Clio V6 Phase 1

The Clio V6 was based on the Clio Mk II, though it shares very few parts with that car. The 3.0 60° V6 ES9 engine, sourced from the PSA group was upgraded to around 230 PS (169 kW; 227 bhp) and placed in the middle of the vehicle where standard Clios have rear seats – making this car a two-seater hot hatch.

In order to accommodate the radical change from front-engine, front-wheel drive hatchback to mid-engine, rear-wheel drive two-seater quasi-coupé, the car had to be extensively reworked structurally, leading to the Phase 1 version being some 300 kg (660 lb) heavier than the sportiest "regular" Clio, the 172 Cup. Due to this, even though the V6 model had significantly more power, it was not remarkably faster in a straight line accelerating to legal road speeds than the 172 Cup – accelerating to 60 mph (97 km/h) in 6.2 seconds compared to the Cup's 6.7 seconds – though its maximum speed was significantly higher, 146 mph (235 km/h) compared to 138 mph (222 km/h). The raw sound and weight of the V6 engine just behind the driver and RWD made the driving experience very different from the normal front engined front wheel drive car.

There were 1,631 production cars built in total between 2001 and 2002.

== Clio V6 Phase 2 (2003–2005) ==
At the time of its launch in 2003, the upgraded Phase 2 Clio V6 was the most powerful serial produced hot hatch in the world with 255 PS (188 kW; 252 bhp), exceeding the Alfa Romeo 147 GTA (250 PS (184 kW; 247 bhp)) and the SEAT León Cupra R (225 PS (165 kW; 222 bhp)).

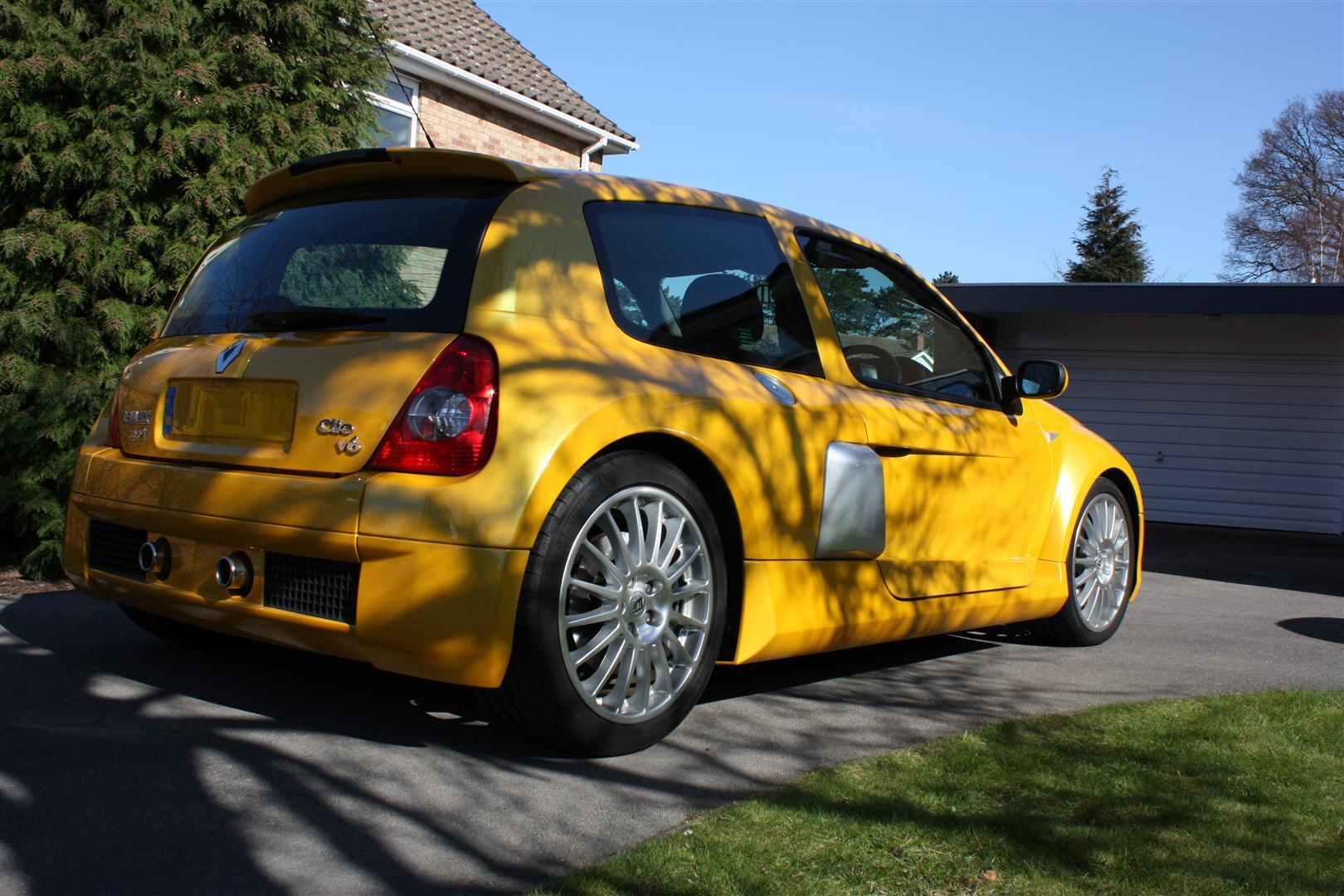
Renault Clio V6 rear view (Phase 2)

Though based on a utilitarian hatchback, the Clio V6 is not a practical family car. With an average fuel consumption of 24 miles per imperial gallon (12 L/100 km; 20 mpg_{‑US}), this resulted in an empty fuel tank in just over 300 miles (480 km). The loss of the back seats and most of the boot space, due to the engine placement, results in a severe restriction in luggage space – there is only a small space in the front where the engine used to be, suitable for a holdall or week-end groceries, a small netted area behind the seats plus a small stash area under the tailgate. The enhanced steering makes tight manoeuvring a little challenging, the turning circle is 13 m (42.7 ft) – around three car lengths – turning what might normally be a three-point turn into a five-point turn. The Clio V6 Phase 2 gained even more weight, but offset it with an additional 25 horsepower. This resulted in a reduced 0–60 mph (97 km/h) run at 5.9 seconds and a top speed of 153 mph (246 km/h).

Standard equipment includes rain sensing windscreen wipers, automatic headlights, air conditioning, and six speakers and CD changer. The Phase 2 Clio V6 retailed for £27,125 in the United Kingdom, until it was withdrawn from sale in 2005 coinciding with a facelift for the Clio range. The long-term reviews in Evo magazine were enthusiastic, claiming "It's a modern classic" for the Phase 2 version. Jeremy Clarkson once referred to the Clio V6 as one of his top 10 cars.

There were 1,309 production cars built in total between 2003 and 2005.

== Engines ==
Model	Engine	Years	Power	Torque	Displacement
Trophy	ES9J4 V6	1999–2003	285 PS (281 bhp; 210 kW)	307 N⋅m (226 lb⋅ft)	2,946 cc (2.9 L; 179.8 cu in)
Phase 1	ES9J4 V6	2001–2003	230 PS (227 bhp; 169 kW)	300 N⋅m (221 lb⋅ft)	2,946 cc (2.9 L; 179.8 cu in)
Phase 2	ES9J4 V6	2003–2005	255 PS (252 bhp; 188 kW)	300 N⋅m (221 lb⋅ft)	2,946 cc (2.9 L; 179.8 cu in)
