= Svatopluk Kvaizar =

Czech racing driver (1947–2025)

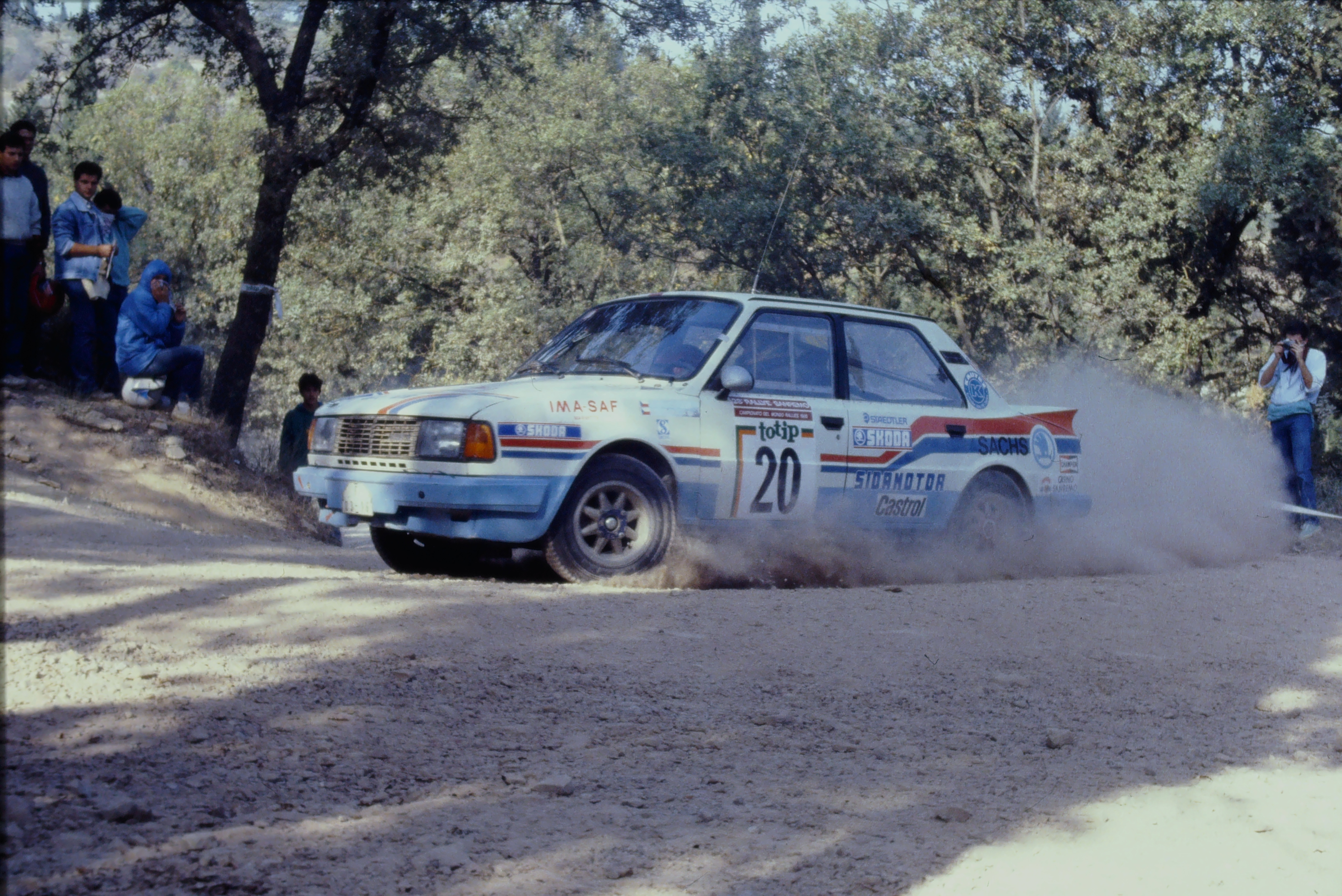
- Kvaizar on Škoda 130 LR at the 1986 Rallye Sanremo
- Nationality: Czech
- Born: 21 August 1947
- Died: 18 July 2025 (aged 77)

MČSSR career
- Years active: 1975–2025
- Former teams: Škoda Motorsport
- Wins: 9
- Podiums: 24
Medal record
1976	PMaP
1979	MČSSR
1980	PMaP
1983	PMaP
1985	PMaP
1985	MČSSR

Svatopluk Kvaizar (21 August 1947 – 18 July 2025) was a Czech rally driver. He was the winner of the Peace and Friendship Cup (1983, 1985) and champion of Czechoslovakia (1979, 1985). He was one of the first Czech drivers to compete in the WRC, where he competed 17 times. He also competed in the ERC and Mitropa. He was a long-time factory driver for the Škoda Motorsport team.

== Career ==
Kvaizar began competing in racing in 1976 and ended in 1988, after 13 years spent in Škoda 110, 120 and 130 cars.

His best classification in the WRC is 9th place at the Rally Sanremo in 1986 with Jiří Janeček as co-driver. (The competition was then cancelled by FISA in December of the same year, following the controversy over the Lancia/Peugeot cars due to their illegality.) In 1978, Kvaizar won the RAC Rally Class 1/2.

His co-driver was Jiří Kotek from the beginning until the middle of the 1981 season, replaced by Jan Soukup in mid-1983 and then Monika Eckardt (RAC Rally 1984). He was then co-driver by Janeček until the end of his career.

== Death ==
Kvaizar died on 18 July 2025, at the age of 77.
