= Ford RS200 =

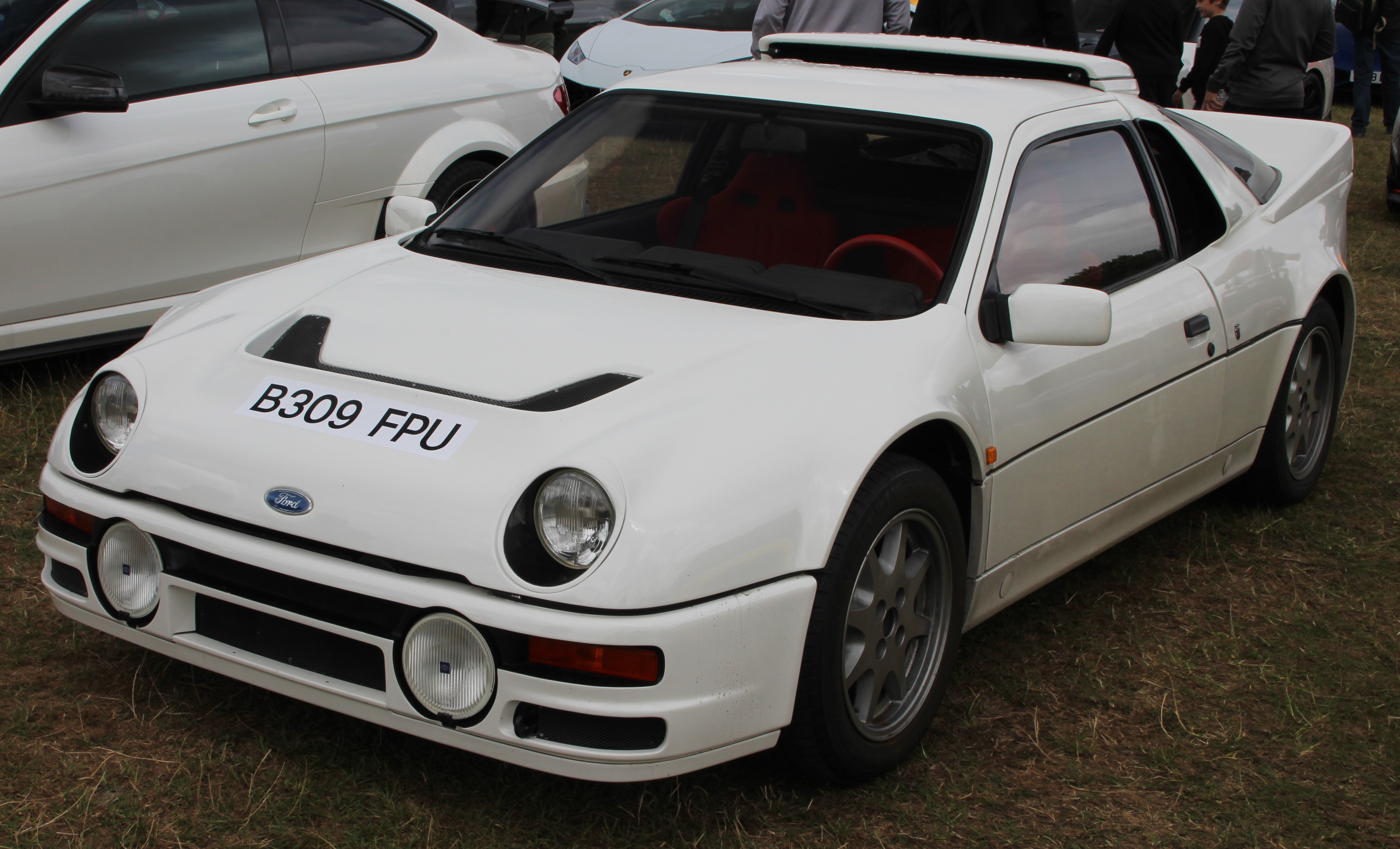

Overview
- Manufacturer: Reliant Motor Company for Ford Europe
- Production: 1984–1986
- Assembly: United Kingdom: Shenstone (Reliant)
- Designer: Tony Southgate; John Wheeler; Ian Callum; Filippo Sapino at Ghia

Body and chassis
- Class: Sports car (S)
- Body style: 2-door coupé
- Layout: Mid-engined four-wheel drive

Powertrain
- Engine: 1.8 L Cosworth BDT straight-4 2.1 L Cosworth BDT-E straight-4
- Transmission: 5-speed manual

Dimensions
- Wheelbase: 2,540 mm (100.0 in)
- Length: 3,988 mm (157.0 in)
- Width: 1,752 mm (69.0 in)
- Height: 1,320 mm (52.0 in)

Chronology
- Predecessor: Ford Escort RS 1700T
- Successor: Ford Sierra RS Cosworth

The Ford RS200 is a mid-engined, all-wheel-drive sports car that was produced by Reliant Motor Company for Ford Motorsport in Shenstone, UK, from 1984 to 1986. The road-going RS200 was the basis for Ford's Group B rally car and was designed to comply with FIA homologation regulations, which required 200 cars to be completed. The car was first displayed to the public at the Belfast Motor Show.

== History ==
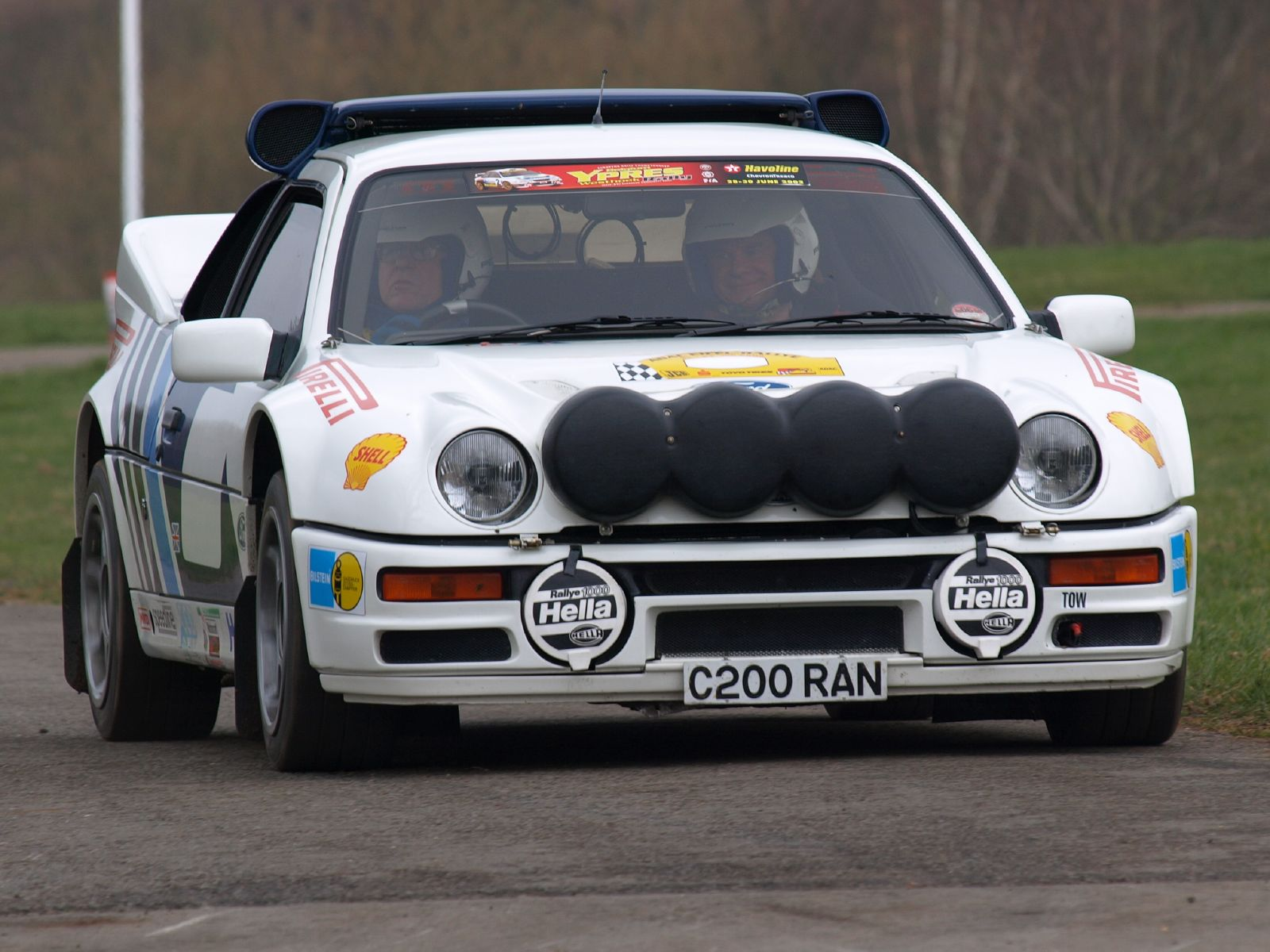
RS200 at the Race Retro 2008

Following the introduction of the Mk3 Escort in 1980, Ford Motorsport set about developing a rear-wheel-drive, turbocharged variant of the vehicle that could be entered into competition in Group B rally racing. Ford had dominated Group B's predecessors, Group 3 and Group 4 in the late 1960s and throughout the 1970s with the Mk1 and Mk2 Escorts. It dubbed the new vehicle the Escort RS 1700T. A problem-filled development, plus internal apathy against the car (which had little in common with the production version of the Mk3 Escort) led Ford to abandon the project in frustration in 1983, leaving them without a new vehicle to enter into Group B. Not wanting to abandon Group B or simply "write off" the cost of developing the failed 1700T, executives decided to make use of the lessons learned developing that vehicle in preparing a new, purpose-built rally car. In addition, Ford executives became adamant that the new vehicle would feature all-wheel-drive, an addition they felt would be necessary to allow it to compete properly with all-wheel-drive models from Peugeot and Audi.

The new vehicle was a unique design, featuring a plastic-fiberglass composite body designed by Ghia, a mid-mounted engine and four-wheel drive. The cars were built on behalf of Ford by Reliant, a British car manufacturer known for their expertise in producing fibreglass bodies. To aid weight distribution, designers mounted the transmission at the front of the car, which required that power from the mid-mounted engine go first up to the front wheels and then be run back again to the rear, creating a complex drive train setup. The chassis was designed by former Formula One designer Tony Southgate, and Ford's John Wheeler, a former F1 engineer, aided in early development. A double wishbone suspension setup with twin dampers on all four wheels aided handling and helped give the car what was often regarded as being the best balanced platform of any of the RS200's contemporary competitors. The Ford parts-bin was raided to help give the RS200 a Ford corporate look; for example, the front windscreen and rear lights were identical to those of the early Sierra and the doors were cut-down Sierra items. Small parts-bin items like switchgear were also used to save development time and expenses.

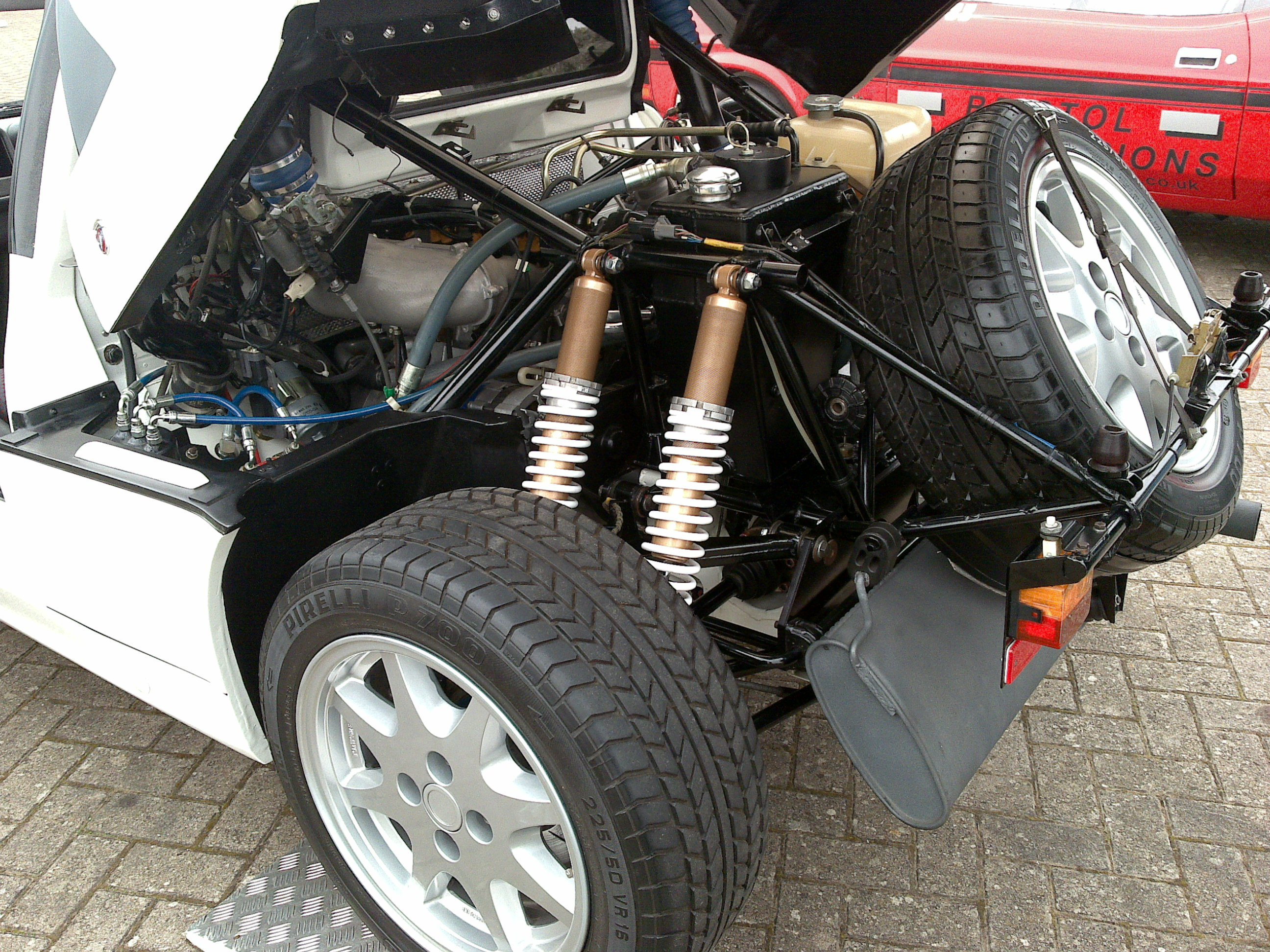
The mid-engined RS200's engine bay and rear suspension

Power came from a 1,803 cc (1.8 L; 110.0 cu in), single turbocharged Ford-Cosworth "BDT" engine producing 250 hp (186 kW) in road-going trim, and between 350 and 450 hp (261 and 336 kW) in racing trim; upgrade kits were available for road-going versions to boost power output to over 300 hp (224 kW). Although the RS had the balance and poise necessary to be competitive, its power-to-weight ratio was poor by comparison, and its engine produced notorious low-RPM lag, making it difficult to drive and ultimately less competitive. Factory driver Kalle Grundel's third-place finish at the 1986 WRC Rally of Sweden represented the vehicle's best-ever finish in Group B rallying competition, although the model did see limited success outside of the ultra-competitive Group B class. However, only one event later, at the Rally de Portugal, a Ford RS200 was involved in one of the most dramatic accidents in WRC history, claiming the lives of three spectators and injuring many others. Another Ford RS200 was crashed by Swiss Formula One driver Marc Surer against a tree during the 1986 Hessen-Rallye in Germany, killing his co-driver and friend Michel Wyder instantly.

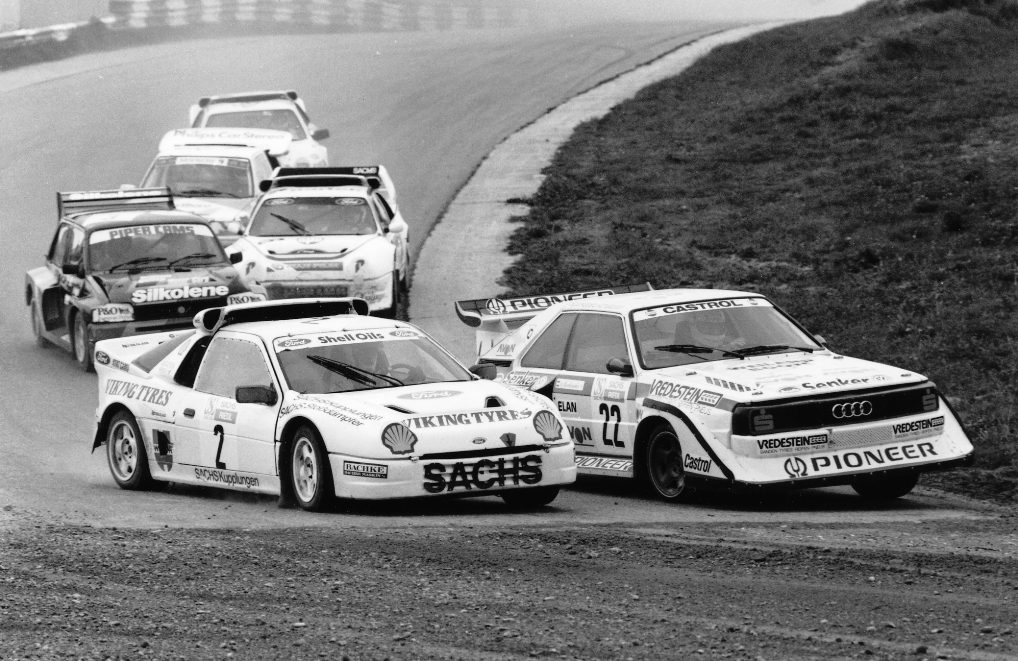
RS200 and Audi Quattro S1 competing in rallycross

The accident at Rally Portugal set off a chain reaction and the RS200 became obsolete after only one full year of competition as the FIA, the governing board, which at the time controlled WRC rally racing, abolished Group B after the 1986 season. For 1987, Ford had planned to introduce an "Evolution" variant of the RS200, featuring a development of the BDT engine, called later as BDT-E, displacing 2,137 cc (2.1 L; 130.4 cu in), developed by Briton Brian Hart. Power figures for the engine vary quite a bit from source to source, depending on the mechanical setup e.g. boost levels, power output ranges from 550 hp (558 PS; 410 kW) to 815 hp (826 PS; 608 kW); although most typical output was 580 hp (588 PS; 433 kW) at 8,000 rpm and 400 lb⋅ft (542 N⋅m) at 5,500 rpm of torque. The ban on Group B racing effectively forced the E2 model into retirement; however, more than a dozen of them were successfully run from August 1986 until October 1992 in the FIA European Championships for Rallycross Drivers events all over Europe, and Norwegian Martin Schanche claimed the 1991 European rallycross title with a Ford RS200 E2 that produced over 650 bhp (485 kW).

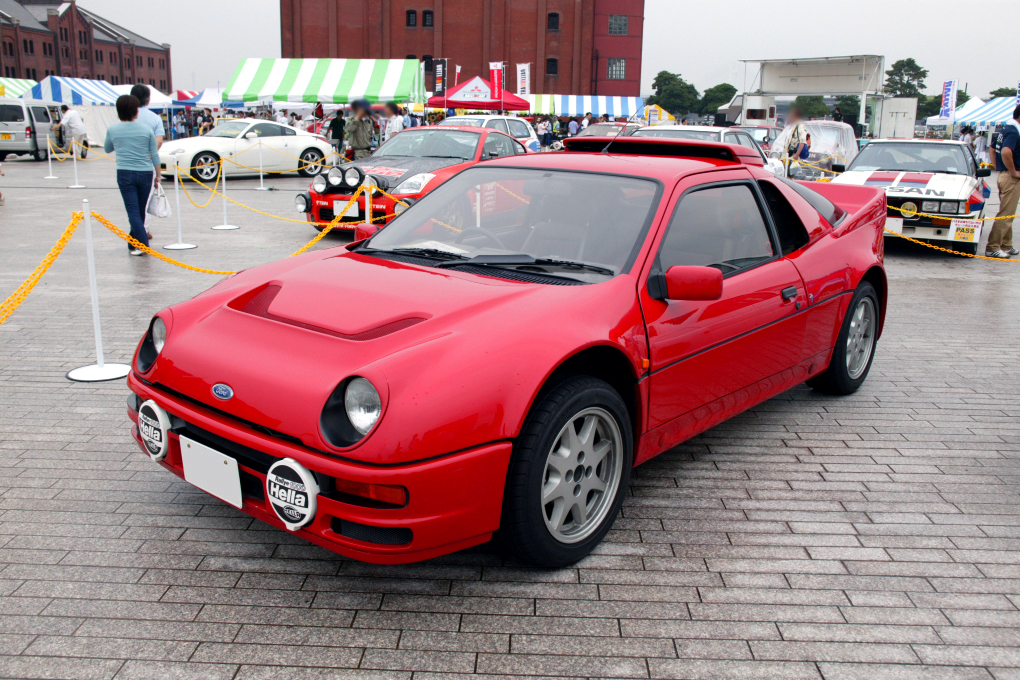
Ford RS200 at the Spirit of Rally 2005

One RS200, which found its way into circuit racing, originated as a road car; it was converted to IMSA GTO specification powered by an over-750 BHP 2.0 litre turbo BDTE Cosworth Evolution engine. Competing against the numerous factory-backed teams such as Mazda, Mercury and Nissan, with their newly built spaceframe specials as a privateer, the car never achieved any real success to be a serious contender and was kept by the original owner. A parts car was built in England and later used to compete in the unlimited category at the Pikes Peak International Hill Climb, where it was driven by Swede Stig Blomqvist in 2001, 2002 and 2004 and in 2009 by former British Rallycross champion Mark Rennison.

In June 2024, Ford & Boreham Motorworks teased a "Remaster" of the RS200, alongside the Ford Escort MK1 continuation.

== Production ==
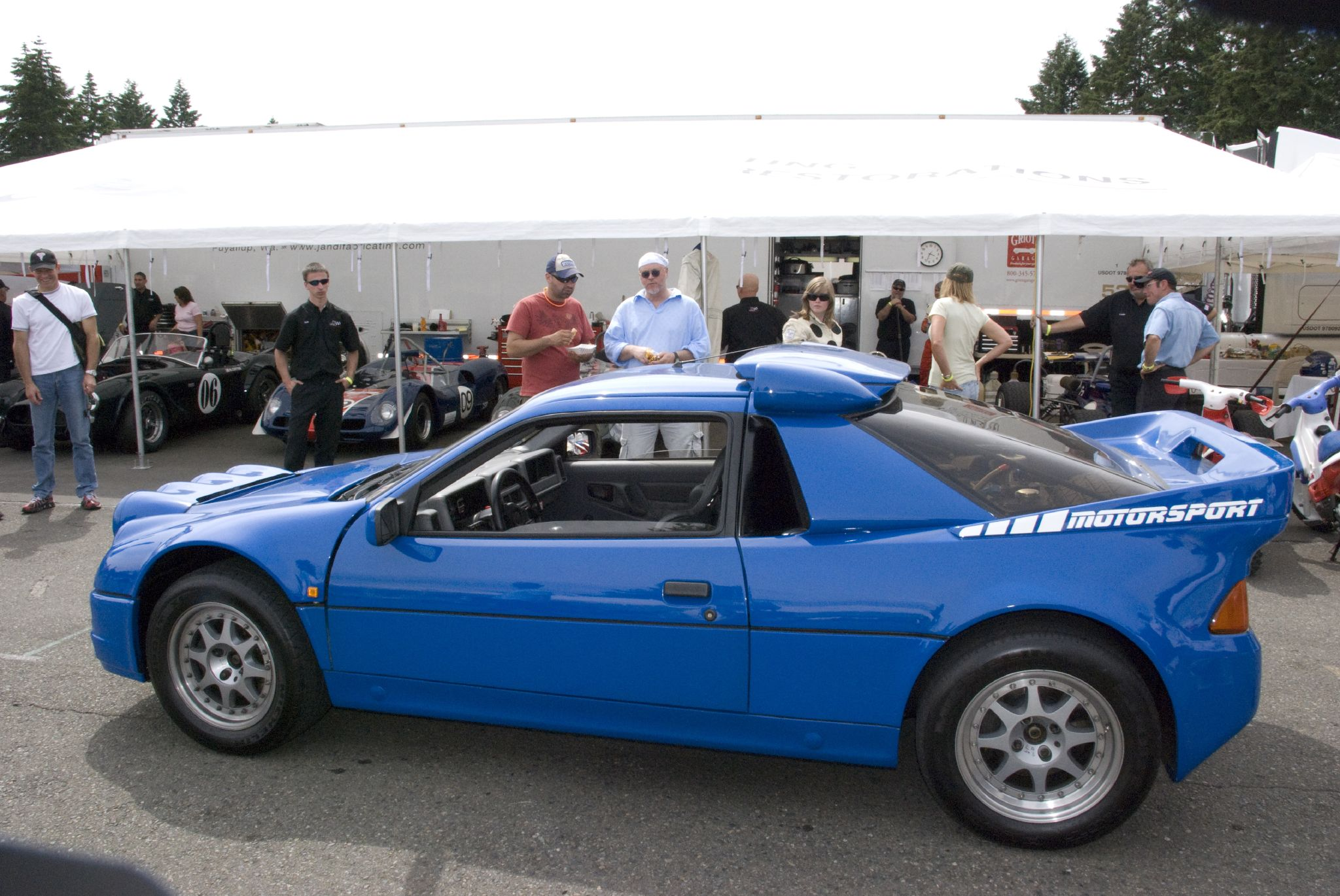
A blue production RS200.

FIA homologation rules for Group B required the construction of at least 200 road-legal vehicles, and Ford contracted Reliant Motors PLC to construct these 200 units at their Shenstone facility, with spare parts for another 20+ units put aside for the racing teams. Those chassis and spare parts were later also used to build a couple of non-genuine, so-called bitsa cars. The Ford RS200 originally cost £49,995 in 1985. However, due to its cult status and Group B legacy, the car's value has increased to over six figures, with the highly sought-after Evolution (EVO) models selling for significantly more. For example, in 2017, a Ford RS200 Evolution sold for $550,000 at a Bonhams auction in the US, which is the record auction price for the car. In November 2023, another Ford RS200 Evolution sold for £486,000 at Iconic Auctioneers.

=== Evolution (E/E2) ===
Group B required any modifications and upgrades had to be homologated by building a further batch of 20 road models to certify the revised specification. Even though Group B had been banned by the time the evolution model was ready, Ford produced the road cars regardless.

A total of 24 of the 200 original cars were reportedly later converted to the so-called "Evolution" models, mostly marked by their owners as "E" or "E2" types. Ford's first intention was to mark the FIA-required 20 "Evo" cars as series numbers 201 to 220 but as this was actually not necessary according to the FIA rules they later kept their original series numbers (e.g. 201 = 012, 202 = 146, 203 = 174 et cetera). Changes were mostly mechanical, with the engine being designated BDT-E. Additional cool ducts were fitted above the roof, on either side of the main engine intake.

=== 'S' Version ===
During the sales programme a Canadian entrepreneur, Murray H. de Weerdt, approached Ford with a proposal to purchase 20 cars and to commission them to have a better level of equipment in an attempt to produce a more marketable "ultimate RS200". He coined the term "The 'S' Version" although permission was never formerly granted by Ford to use this designation however he went on to produce sale literature. Changes included wider seats, Air Conditioning, improved cooling and increased power. A total of 20 were produced, 16 standard cars and 4 evolution spec, including 4 in red. The deal ultimately never came to fruition although Mr de Weerdt went on to own one of the cars himself, chassis number 110. The remaining 19 were sold by Ford to private buyers. The full chassis number list is still available where the "S" designation can be seen.

== Specification (Group B rally car) ==
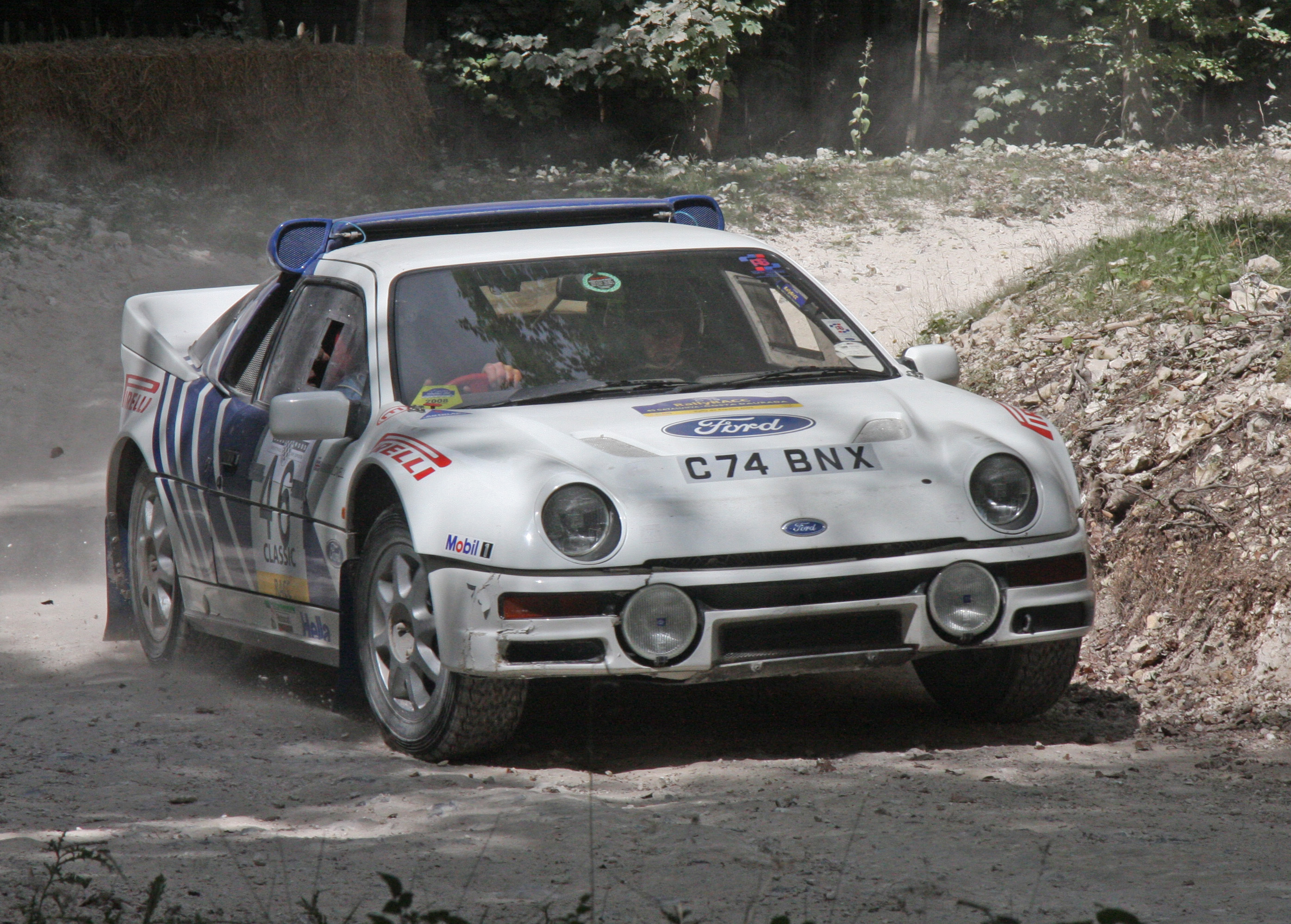
An RS200 driven at the 2010 Goodwood Festival of Speed

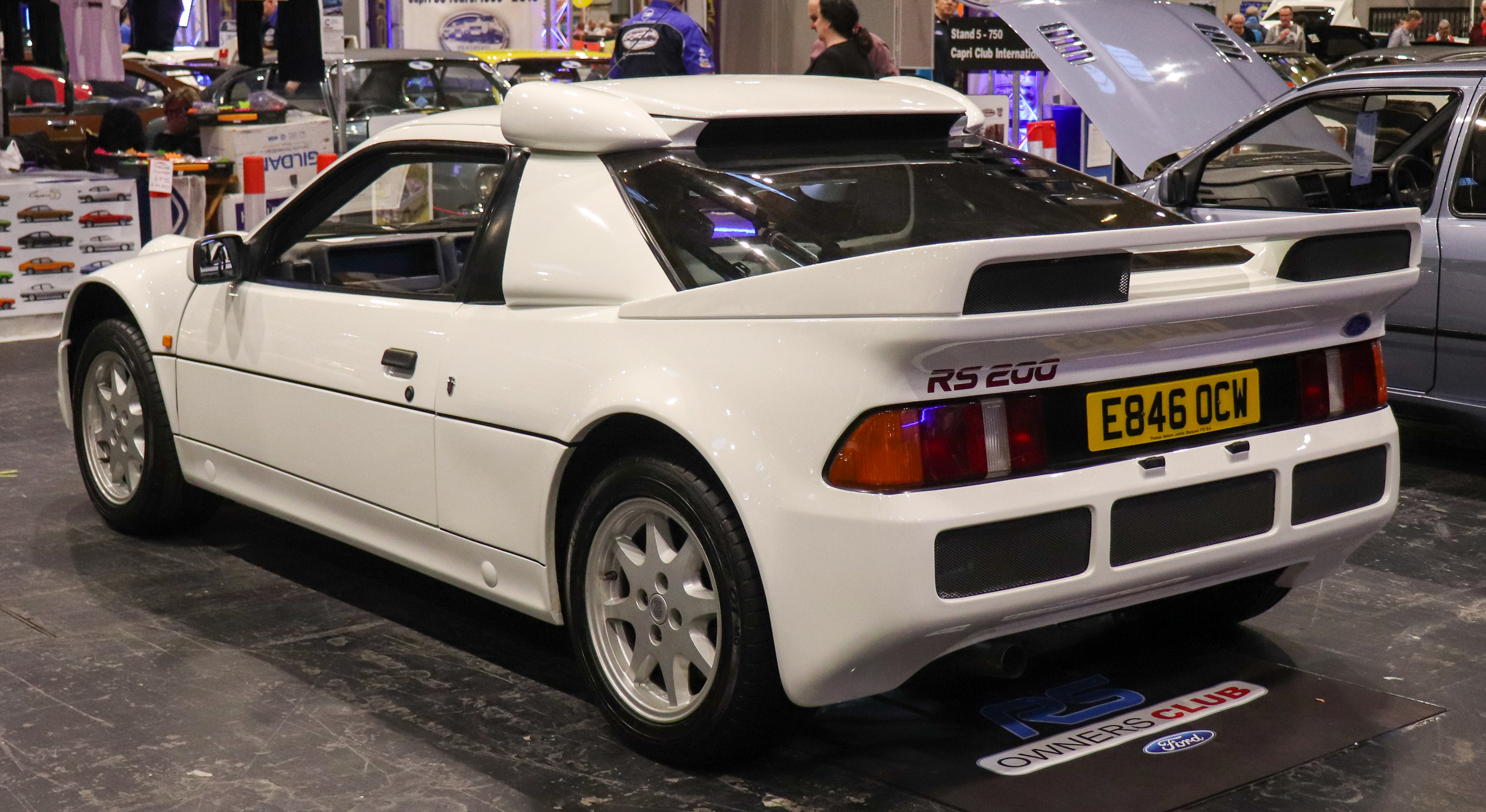
The rear of an RS200

Ford RS200 at Goodwood

=== Engine ===
- Longitudinally-mounted, mid-engine, four-wheel-drive layout
- Head/block aluminium alloy/aluminium alloy
- 4 cylinders in line, Nikasil integrated liners
- 5 main bearings. Water cooled, electric fan
- Bore: 86 mm (3.39 in)
- Stroke: 77.6 mm (3.06 in)
- Capacity: 1,803 cc (1.8 L; 110.0 cu in)
- Valve gear: Dual overhead cams, 4 valves per cylinder, toothed belt camshaft drive

Compression ratio: 7.2:1. Bosch Motronic engine management system and fuel injection. Garrett T3 turbocharger/boost pressure 23 psi (1.6 bar).

- Max. power: 450 PS (331 kW; 444 hp) at 8,000 rpm
- Max. torque: 360 lb⋅ft (490 N⋅m) at 5,500 rpm

=== Transmission ===
- 5-speed manual, AP twin plate paddle clutch with cerrametallic linings

Gear	Ratio	mph/1,000 rpm
5th	1.14	13.26
4th	1.36	10.90
3rd	1.68	8.88
2nd	2.14	7.08
1st	3.23	4.72

Final drive: Spiral bevel, ratio 4.375 to transfer ratio of 1.15

=== Suspension ===
- Front, independent, double wishbones, twin coil springs and telescopic dampers, anti-roll bar
- Rear, independent, double wishbones, twin coil springs and telescopic dampers, anti-roll bar, adjustable toe control link

=== Steering ===
- Rack and pinion, a small quantity of cars also had hydraulic power assistance. Steering wheel diameter 14 in, 1.8 turns lock-to-lock

=== Brakes ===
Dual circuits, split front/rear. Front 11.8 in (300 mm) diameter ventilated discs. Rear 11.8 in (300 mm) diameter ventilated discs, no vacuum servo. Handbrake, mechanical fly-off and hydraulic centre lever acting on separate, mechanically operated rear calipers.

=== Wheels ===
Ford magnesium alloy, 6–8 in rims (8¾ in and 11 in option for racing tyres). Tyre dependent on conditions (Pirelli Monte Carlo intermediates 245/40 16 on test car), 16 in diameter, pressures dependent on tyres used.

=== Dimensions and weights ===
- Length: 157.5 in (4,000 mm)
- Width: 69.0 in (1,753 mm)
- Height: variable
- Wheelbase: 99.6 in (2,530 mm)
- Track (Front/Rear): 59.1 / 58.9 in (1,501 / 1,496 mm)
- Weight: 2,315 lb (1,050 kg)

=== Performance ===
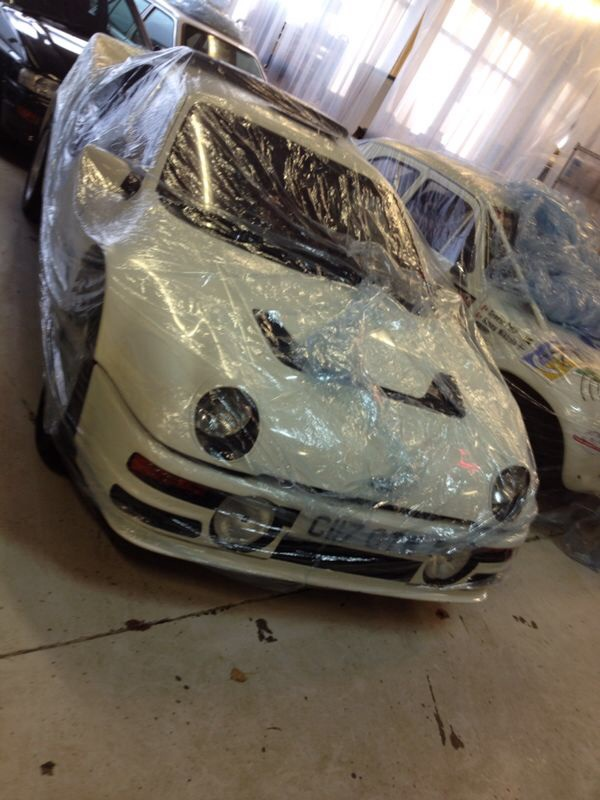
The preserved RS200 with chassis No. 200 at the Ford Heritage Centre, Dagenham

Top speeds:

Gear	mph	km/h	rpm
Top	118	190	8,900
4th	97	156	8,900
3rd	79	127	8,900
2nd	63	101	8,900
1st	42	68	8,900

Acceleration from rest:

True mph	Time (sec)
30	1.2
40	1.8
50	2.6
60	3.8
70	UNK
80	4.8
90	5.9
100	7.3
110	8.7

Standing 1/4-mile: 11.4 sec, 115 mph (185 km/h)

Standing km: Not known

Acceleration (s):

mph	Top	4th	3rd	2nd
10-30	-	-	-	-
20-40	-	-	-	-
30-50	-	-	2.2	1.2
40-60	-	2.3	1.0	1.1
50-70	2.2	1.4	-	-
60-80	1.6	1.5	-	-
70-90	1.7	1.6	-	-
80-100	2.0	-	-	-
90-110	2.4	-	-	-
