= Hämäläinen =

- Language: Finnish

Origin
- Meaning: "Tavastian", from hämäläinen ("a Tavastian"), derived from hämälä, form of Häme ("Tavastia") and -inen ("-ian")
- Region of origin: Finland

Hämäläinen is a surname originating in Finland (in Finnish, it means "Tavastian"), where it is the sixth most common surname. Notable people with the surname include:

- Aatu Hämäläinen (born 1987), Finnish professional ice hockey player
- Aleksi Hämäläinen (born 1995), Finnish ice hockey forward
- Alex Hämäläinen (1894–1943), Finnish farmworker, logger, party functionary and politician
- Anna Hämäläinen (born 1994), Finnish athlete
- Antony Hämäläinen (born 1980), Finnish musician and composer, now in the U.S.
- August Hämäläinen (1874–1956), Finnish farmer and politician
- Brian Hämäläinen (born 1989), Danish player of football (soccer)
- Eduard Hämäläinen (born 1969), Finnish decathlete
- Elias Hämäläinen (born 1985), Finnish musician, winner of Finnish X Factor 2010
- Erik Hämäläinen (born 1965), Finnish player of ice hockey
- Helvi Hämäläinen (1907–1998), Finnish author
- Ida Hämäläinen (1875–1961), Finnish seamstress and politician
- Inka Hämäläinen (born 2005), Finnish biathlete
- Jaana Hämäläinen, Finnish curler
- Juuso Hämäläinen (born 1993), Finnish association football player
- Jyrki Hämäläinen (1942–2008), Finnish magazine editor and biographer
- Kalevi Hämäläinen (1932–2005), Finnish cross country skier
- Kasper Hämäläinen (born 1986), Finnish footballer
- Kyösti Hämäläinen (born 1945), Finnish rally driver
- Lahja Hämäläinen, Finnish ice sledge speed racer
- Mika Hämäläinen (born 1967), Finnish cyclist
- Mikko Hämäläinen (1891–1965), Finnish gymnast
- Niko Hämäläinen (born 1997), Finnish-American Footballer
- Pekka Hämäläinen (born 1967), Finnish history professor at University of Oxford
- Pekka Hämäläinen (1938–2013), Finnish football player and administrator
- Pentti Hämäläinen (1929–1984), Finnish bantamweight boxer
- Pirkko Hämäläinen (disambiguation), multiple people
- Raimo Hämäläinen (born 1948), Finnish professor of mathematics
- Rasmus Hämäläinen (born 1994), Finnish ice hockey player
- Reeta Hämäläinen (born 1988), Finnish rallying co-driver
- Roope Hämäläinen (born 1992), Finnish ice hockey player
- Sirkka Hämäläinen (born 1939), Finnish economist, governor of the Bank of Finland
- Taneli Hämäläinen (born 2001), Finnish professional football player
- Tapio Hämäläinen (1922–2008), Finnish actor
- Tuomo Hämäläinen (born 1945), Finnish swimmer
- Tuulikki Hämäläinen (1940–2023), Finnish economist and politician
- Ville Hämäläinen (born 1981), Finnish professional ice hockey player
