= Finnish Rally Championship =

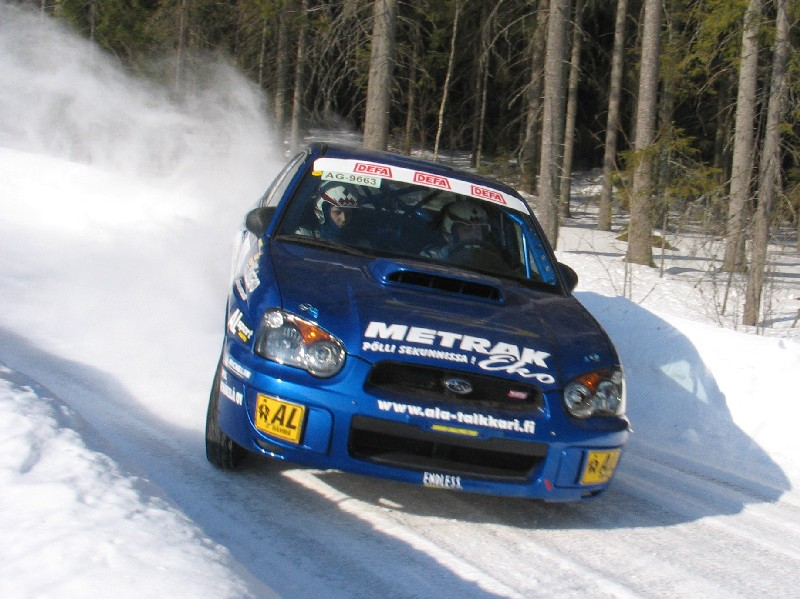
Jukka Ketomäki at the 2005 Peurunkaralli

The Finnish Rally Championship is the national rally championship in Finland. The series currently has four classes; Super4 (including R5, S2000 and old WRC cars), Production4 (including Group N cars), R2 (including R2 and R1 cars) and Super2 (including other 2WD cars apart from R2 and R1).

== History ==
The series began in 1959 and featured four events; Hankiralli, 500-ralli, Syysralli and the 1000 Lakes Rally. Esko Keinänen and his co-driver Kai Nuortila took the title with a Peugeot 403. In 1970, Group 2 was introduced with Timo Mäkinen taking the first title. Group 4 championship was contested from 1976 to 1978. In the 1980s, Group A cars were allowed in Group 1, eventually replacing the older homologation entirely. Group 2 was replaced by Group N in 1987 and a new championship was created for Group B cars from 1983 to 1988. Group 4 entrants were allowed to participate in the Group B championship in 1983 and 1984. In the late 1980s, groups A and N were divided into over and under 2000 cc classes, creating the new groups "a" and "n". In addition to the usual classes, the Finnish Rally Championship for Ladies has been contested from 1971 to 1978 and from 1986 to 2000.

== Champions ==
Year	Group			
Year	Group 1			
1959	(Finland) Esko Keinänen			
1960	(Finland) Carl-Otto Bremer			
1961	(Finland) Rauno Aaltonen			
1962	(Finland) Pauli Toivonen			
1963	(Finland) Simo Lampinen			
1964	(Finland) Simo Lampinen			
1965	(Finland) Rauno Aaltonen			
1966	(Finland) Timo Mäkinen			
1967	(Finland) Simo Lampinen			
1968	(Finland) Hannu Mikkola			
1969	(Finland) Jorma Lusenius			
Year	Group 2	Group 1		
1970	(Finland) Timo Mäkinen	(Finland) Eero Nuuttila		
1971	(Finland) Tapio Rainio	(Finland) Eero Nuuttila		
1972	(Finland) Tapio Rainio	(Finland) Esa Nuuttila		
1973	(Finland) Timo Mäkinen	(Finland) Kyösti Hämäläinen		
1974	(Finland) Hannu Mikkola	(Finland) Pentti Airikkala		
1975	(Finland) Simo Lampinen	(Finland) Kyösti Hämäläinen		
Year	Group 4	Group 2	Group 1	
1976	(Finland) Tapio Rainio	(Finland) Heikki Vilkman	(Finland) Kyösti Hämäläinen	
1977	(Finland) Ulf Grönholm	(Finland) Hannu Valtaharju	(Finland) Kyösti Hämäläinen	
1978	(Finland) Markku Alén	(Finland) Ulf Grönholm	(Finland) Kyösti Hämäläinen	
Year	Group 2	Group 1		
1979	(Finland) Kyösti Hämäläinen	(Finland) Veli Hirvonen		
1980	(Finland) Kyösti Hämäläinen	(Finland) Mikael Sundström		
1981	(Finland) Kyösti Hämäläinen	(Finland) Antero Laine		
1982	(Finland) Kyösti Hämäläinen	(Finland) Harri Väänänen		
Year	Group B	Group A	Group 2	
1983	(Finland) Lasse Lampi	(Finland) Mikael Sundström	(Finland) Kyösti Hämäläinen	
1984	(Finland) Antero Laine	(Finland) Mika Arpiainen	(Finland) Kyösti Hämäläinen	
1985	(Finland) Antero Laine	(Finland) Mika Arpiainen	(Finland) Kyösti Hämäläinen	
1986	(Finland) Timo Heinonen	(Finland) Risto Buri	(Finland) Kyösti Hämäläinen	
Year	Group B	Group A	Group N	
1987	(Finland) Petteri Lindström	(Finland) Mikael Sundström	(Finland) Sakari Vierimaa	
Year	Group B	Group A +2000cc	Group A -2000cc	Group N
1988	(Finland) Petteri Lindström	(Finland) Mikael Sundström	(Finland) Sampsa Junnila	(Finland) Tommi Mäkinen
Year	Group A +2000cc	Group A -2000cc	Group N +2000cc	Group N -2000cc
1989	(Finland) Mikael Sundström	(Finland) Teemu Tahko	(Finland) Timo Kuivinen	(Finland) Petri Kaura
1990	(Finland) Sebastian Lindholm	(Finland) Jarmo Kytölehto	(Finland) Arto Kumpumäki	(Finland) Jouni Ahvenlammi
1991	(Finland) Lasse Lampi	(Finland) Jarmo Kytölehto	(Finland) Marcus Grönholm	(Finland) Ari Saxberg
1992	(Finland) Esa Saarenpää	(Finland) Mika Kelkkanen	(Finland) Jarmo Kytölehto	(Finland) Jukka Mäenpää
1993	(Finland) Sebastian Lindholm	(Finland) Timo Niinimäki	(Finland) Juha Hellman	(Finland) Jorma Laakso
1994	(Finland) Marcus Grönholm	(Finland) Heikki Westerlund	(Finland) Jari Latvala	(Finland) Jorma Laakso
1995	(Finland) Sebastian Lindholm	(Finland) Harri Rovanperä	(Finland) Mika Korhonen	(Finland) Jorma Laakso
1996	(Finland) Marcus Grönholm	(Finland) Tapio Laukkanen	(Finland) Jouko Puhakka	(Finland) Harri Rämänen
1997	(Finland) Marcus Grönholm	(Finland) Toni Gardemeister	(Finland) Jouko Puhakka	(Finland) Jani Pirttinen
1998	(Finland) Marcus Grönholm	(Finland) Esa Saarenpää	(Finland) Jouko Puhakka	(Finland) Hannu Jokinen
1999	(Finland) Pasi Hagström	(Finland) Kari Kivenne	(Finland) Janne Tuohino	(Finland) Tomi Tukiainen
2000	(Finland) Sebastian Lindholm	(Finland) Jani Pirttinen	(Finland) Jani Paasonen	(Finland) Eero Räikkönen
2001	(Finland) Janne Tuohino	(Finland) Tomi Tukiainen	(Finland) Jouko Puhakka	(Finland) Kosti Katajamäki
2002	(Finland) Sebastian Lindholm	(Finland) Mikko Hirvonen	(Finland) Juha Salo	(Finland) Eero Räikkönen
2003	(Finland) Sebastian Lindholm	(Finland) Janne Vähämiko	(Finland) Hannu Hotanen	(Finland) Timo Mäenpää
2004	(Finland) Sebastian Lindholm	(Finland) Janne Vähämiko	(Finland) Juha Salo	(Finland) Juho Hänninen
Year	Group A	Group N +2000cc	Group N -2000cc	
2005	(Finland) Kosti Katajamäki	(Finland) Juha Salo	(Finland) Marko Mänty	
2006	(Finland) Sebastian Lindholm	(Finland) Jari Ketomaa	(Finland) Matti Rantanen	
2007	(Finland) Jussi Välimäki	(Finland) Jari Ketomaa	(Finland) Joonas Lindroos	
2008	(Finland) Ari Vihavainen	(Finland) Juha Salo	(Finland) Joonas Lindroos	

Year	Class				
Year	SM1 - 4WD	SM2 - 2WD			
2009	(Finland) Jari Ketomaa	(Finland) Joonas Lindroos			
2010	(Finland) Juha Salo	(Finland) Kalle Pinomäki			
2011	(Finland) Juha Salo	(Finland) Kalle Pinomäki			
Year	SM1 - 4WD	SM2	SM3		
2012	(Finland) Esapekka Lappi	(Finland) Ville Hautamäki	(Finland) Andreas Amberg		
2013	(Finland) Juha Salo	(Finland) Jussi Vainionpää	(Finland) Joonas Lindroos		
Year	SM1 - Super 4WD	SM2 - Production 4WD	SM3 - R2	SM4 - Super 2WD	
2014	(Estonia) Karl Kruuda	(Estonia) Kaspar Koitla	(Finland) Samuli Vuorisalo	(Finland) Ville Hautamäki	
2015	(Finland) Juha Salo	(Finland) Teemu Asunmaa	(Finland) Jari Huttunen	(Finland) Ville Hautamäki	
2016	(Finland) Juha Salo	(Finland) Teemu Asunmaa	(Finland) Anssi Rytkönen	(Finland) Jesse Turunen	
2017	(Finland) Teemu Asunmaa	(Finland) Eerik Pietarinen	(Finland) Miika Hokkanen	(Finland) Joonas Lindroos	
2018	(Finland) Eerik Pietarinen	(Finland) Henrik Pietarinen	(Finland) Jaro Kinnunen	(Finland) Erno Kinnunen	
2019	(Finland) Teemu Asunmaa	(Finland) Esa Ruotsalainen	(Finland) Sami Pajari	(Finland) Jesse Turunen	
Year	SM1 - Super 4WD	SM2 - Production 4WD	SM3 - R2	SM4 - V1600	
2020	(Finland) Teemu Asunmaa	(Finland) Ville Hautamäki	(Finland) Lauri Joona	(Finland) Sami Korvola	
2021	(Finland) Emil Lindholm	(Finland) Ville Hautamäki	(Finland) Lauri Joona	(Finland) Oskari Heikkinen	
Year	SM1 - Rally2	SM2 - Production 4WD	SM3 - Rally3	SM4 - Rally4	SM5 - V1600
2022	(Finland) Mikko Heikkilä	(Finland) Ville Hautamäki	(Finland) Roope Korhonen	(Finland) Henri Hokkala	(Finland) Jere Pensas
Year	SM1 - Rally2	SM2 - Rally3	SM3 - Rally4	SM4 - V1600	SM5 - National 4WD
2023	(Finland) Teemu Asunmaa	(Finland) Benjamin Korhola	(Finland) Justus Räikkönen	(Finland) Tuukka Kauppinen	(Finland) Ville Hautamäki
2024	(Finland) Roope Korhonen	(Finland) Henri Hokkala	(Finland) Tuukka Kauppinen	(Finland) Ville Vatanen	(Finland) Arttu Lähdeniemi
2025	(Finland) Esapekka Lappi	(Estonia) Patrick Enok	(Finland) Jarkko Nikara	(Finland) Lauri Halonen	(Finland) Jarno Pentinpuro
