= Marcus Grönholm =

Finnish rally driver (born 1968)

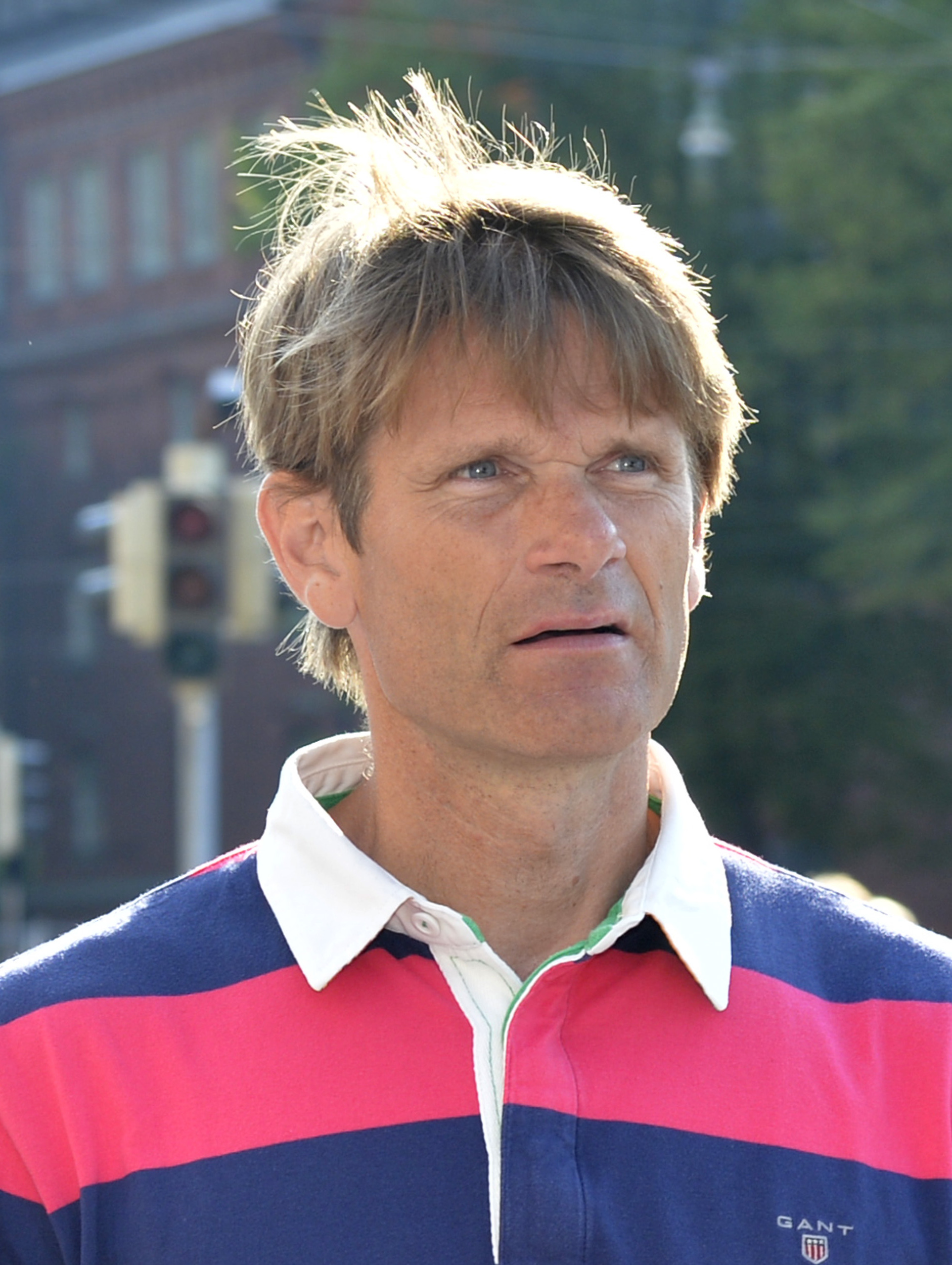
- Marcus Grönholm in 2014

Personal information
- Nationality: (Finland) Finnish
- Full name: Marcus Ulf Johan Grönholm
- Born: February 5, 1968 (age 58); Kauniainen, Finland

World Rally Championship record
- Years active: 1989–2007, 2009–2010, 2019
- Co-driver: (Finland) Ilkka Riipinen (Finland) Timo Rautiainen (Finland) Juha Repo (Finland) Voitto Silander
- Teams: Toyota, Peugeot, Ford
- Rallies: 153
- Championships: 2 (2000, 2002)
- Rally wins: 30
- Podiums: 61
- Stage wins: 542
- Total points: 615
- First rally: 1989 1000 Lakes Rally
- First win: 2000 Swedish Rally
- Last win: 2007 Rally New Zealand
- Last rally: 2019 Rally Sweden

Global RallyCross Championship
- Years active: 2011–2012
- Car number: 3
- Former teams: Olsbergs MSE
- Starts: 8
- Wins: 5
- Podiums: 8
- Best finish: 2nd in 2011

FIA ERX Division 1 Championship
- Years active: 2008
- Former teams: Ford Team RS Europe
- Starts: 3
- Wins: 1
- Podiums: 1
- Best finish: 16th in 2008

Marcus Ulf Johan "Bosse" Grönholm (born February 5, 1968) is a Finnish former rally and rallycross driver, being part of a family of the Swedish-speaking population of Finland lineage. His son, Niclas Grönholm, is an upcoming FIA World Rallycross Championship driver. Grönholm's nicknames are either "Bosse" (mainly in his native Finland and the Scandinavian countries) or "Magic Marcus". Grönholm is one of the most successful WRC drivers of all time, ranking third in rally wins (30), and winning two championships, in 2000 and 2002. After Peugeot withdrew from the World Rally Championship, Grönholm moved to Ford for the 2006 season and placed second in the drivers' world championship, losing out to Sébastien Loeb by one point. The next year, he again placed second, four points behind Loeb. He and his co-driver Timo Rautiainen retired from rallying after the 2007 season but returned to the championship in 2009 driving a private Subaru for a short period of time, and in the 2019 World Rally Championship where he competed in a Toyota Gazoo Racing WRT-maintained Toyota Yaris under the GRX Team banner.

== Career ==
=== Early career ===
Grönholm's father, Ulf "Uffe" Grönholm, had been an active rally driver in the late 1970s to early 1980s, and with measurable success too, winding up twice Finnish champion. He was killed during a practice run for Hankiralli on February 25, 1981, in Kirkkonummi. Despite this connection, his son, only 13 years old at the time of his father's death, refutes any suggestion that it was Ulf, and not fellow rally-driving cousin (and occasional Peugeot factory squad teammate at various points during the early 2000s), Sebastian Lindholm, who tempted him into following in his father's footsteps by also participating in the sport. In his teens Grönholm was fond of motocross as a recreational activity, but a serious knee injury forced a switch to boxing.

Grönholm featured in various bit-part roles in the world series throughout the 1990s, most notably with Toyota with whom he drove Celicas and Corolla WRCs. Much considered as a late-bloomer he did not become a factory driver until his early 30s. A staggering string of fastest stage times one year as a privateer, on the final day of the Rally Finland, subsequently brought him to the attention of such factory teams as Ford, Toyota and Peugeot, who all presented him with offers for further employment. It was only when he joined the latter marque, championship newcomers for 1999, that he began to enjoy such meteoric success.

=== 1999–2005: Peugeot ===
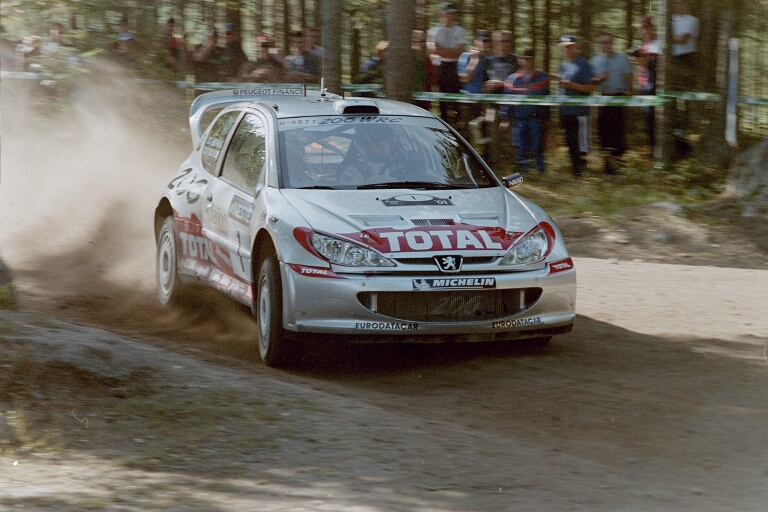
Grönholm driving a Peugeot 206 WRC at the 2001 Rally Finland.

After suffering an engine failure on the season-opening round in Monte Carlo in 2000, Grönholm took his first championship win on the Swedish Rally the following month, with the 206 WRC. Consequent wins, including on his home round of the series, were sufficient to see off closest points challenger, Subaru's Richard Burns and land a shock first title after finishing second to the Englishman in the Rally of Great Britain. After an irksome and unsuccessful championship defense in 2001 during which assorted mechanical problems kept him down to fourth overall in the points table, he easily won his second title in 2002.

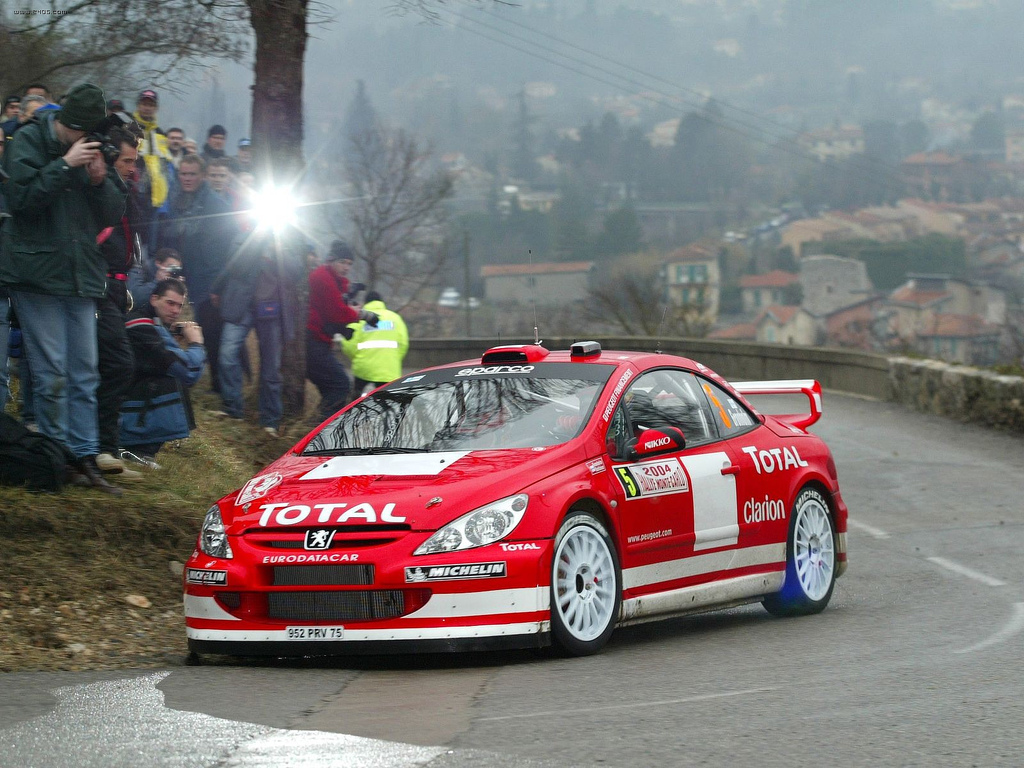
Grönholm with a Peugeot 307 WRC at the 2004 Monte Carlo Rally.

In 2003, Peugeot stuck with the same lineup as 2002 (Grönholm, Burns, Panizzi and Rovanperä) and also the 206. The only change was that the team now had major sponsorship from cigarette giants Marlboro painting the cars red and white. However the 206 was now four years old and showing its age. Grönholm covered this with three wins in Sweden, New Zealand and Argentina (the latter after an incident with a bank which dropped him to as low as 6th); however fuel pressure issues in Greece and a broken Propshaft in Cyprus meant Grönholm lost valuable points. A second in Germany was followed by accidents in Finland, Australia and Italy and by this stage he had fallen to sixth in the Championship. Fourth in France and sixth in Spain after a wrong tire choice was followed by another crash in Great Britain when he hit a pile of logs on a stage. The police soon caught him and despite his best efforts Grönholm was forbidden to go back to service. He finished sixth with 46 points.

In 2004, Peugeot introduced the new 307 to replace the 206, but the car was plagued by gearbox and power steering woes throughout the season. Grönholm took an immediate dislike to the new car because of its poor reliability, battling gearbox problems in Monte Carlo and power steering issues in Sweden. After more power steering woes in Mexico he stated "I'm fed up with this car". An eventful second in New Zealand was followed by heartbreak in Cyprus: Here, Grönholm thought he had taken the 307's first win but after the event both he and teammate Harri Rovanperä (who finished fifth) were disqualified for illegal water pumps. A damaged suspension took him out in Greece, while despite a second in Turkey, co-driver Rautiainen suffered two broken bones in his bottom after they ran over a loose steel rod lying on the stage they were driving on which went through Rautiainen's seat - this incident went viral when after a reporter's question, Grönholm explained that something went through the seat "up in the ass of Timo". In Finland everything clicked despite a gearbox issue and Grönholm finally got a win he was allowed to keep, but he went from hero to zero by crashing on the first stage in Germany. Spain would be his last podium of the year, coming home second after winning a battle with Carlos Sainz. This meant Grönholm finished a frustrating fifth with 62 points.

For 2005, Peugeot switched from Michelin to Pirelli tires, feeling that they could win on different rubber and to give Pirelli opportunities with other teams as only Subaru used their rubber in 2004. Grönholm also had a new teammate in Markko Märtin as Rovanperä joined Mitsubishi. After a difficult start with crashes in Monaco and Sweden Grönholm finished second in Mexico and New Zealand and was in contention for the win in Italy until a hefty roll down a hill cost him a heap of time and he had to settle for third. Retirement in Cyprus was followed by another third in Turkey where he lost a fight with Solberg for second; however both were comfortably beaten by Loeb who dominated the year with ten wins and Michelin tires that were superior to the Pirelli on the Peugeot. Groholm criticised the 307's speed in Argentina where despite coming second he stated "It's impossible to go faster with this car". He did take two wins in Finland and Japan, both of which creating contrasting emotions. In Finland, he won his home rally for the fifth time despite Rautiainen having another bizarre injury when he damaged a vertebra over a jump. The Japan event came just a week after the death of Märtin's co-driver Michael Park after a crash in Great Britain (Grönholm was therefore withdrawn from the event) and Grönholm was set to finish second until rally leader Petter Solberg crashed on the penultimate stage handing Grönholm the win. It would be Grönholm's last with Peugeot as he retired from the last three events of the year in France (gearbox issues) Spain (technical failure) and Australia (damaged suspension) and although he tied with Solberg on 71 points, the Norwegian pipped him to second with more wins (3-2) so Grönholm finished third. At the end of the year, Peugeot left the championship and Grönholm needed to find a new team.

=== 2006–2007: Ford ===
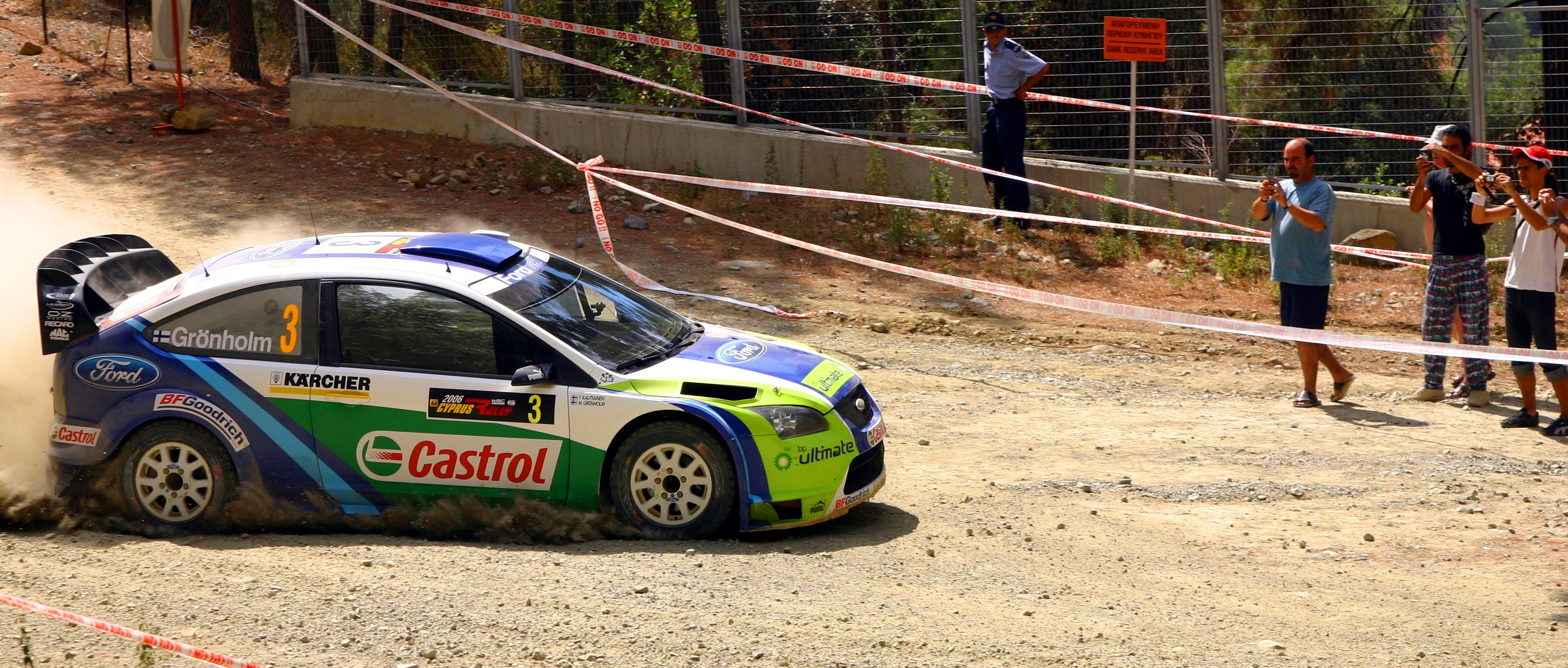
Grönholm driving a Ford Focus RS WRC 06 at the 2006 Cyprus Rally.

For the 2006 season, Grönholm switched to the Ford team, driving their all-new 2006-specification Focus RS WRC. On his debut, in January, he won his first ever tarmac rally in Monte Carlo, beating Sébastien Loeb by over a minute, albeit beaten by the Frenchman on the road with the championship's unliked 'Superally' regulations coming to his rescue as a shunt for the Citroën hastened its exit from Leg One. Although he was to follow this up with an entirely credible win in the second event of the season, Sweden, subsequent events saw Loeb surge past into a comfortable lead: the Frenchman was to never finish below second place in every event he entered, while his adversary was left to rue a string of retirements and errors that stymied his challenge.

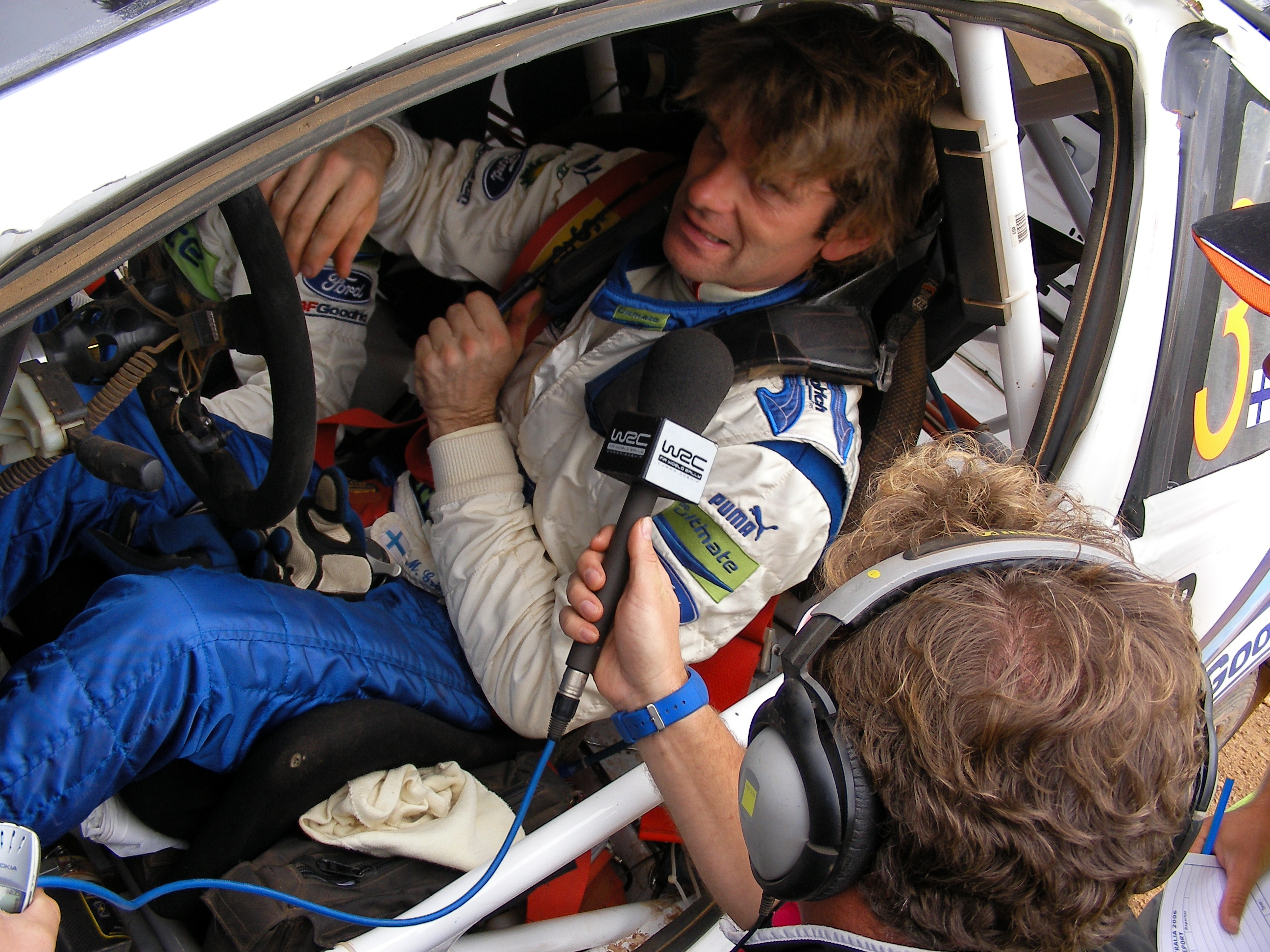
Grönholm at the 2006 Telstra Rally Australia.

In the meantime, the hopeful Grönholm collected victories over Loeb in Greece and Finland. Loeb's hopes seemed to be coming to fruition when yet another victory in Cyprus brought him to the brink of the title; however he was to suffer his own blow days later when injury from a biking accident forced him out of the last four rounds of the series. Grönholm was able to push within one point of the lead in the total standings as Loeb recovered, but his claim to the title was finally extinguished when he rolled out of contention on the first leg of the penultimate event in Australia. Some solace for Grönholm, though, came in that another victory in New Zealand ahead of teammate Mikko Hirvonen was to confirm the manufacturers' title for his Ford team over Loeb-less Kronos Citroën.

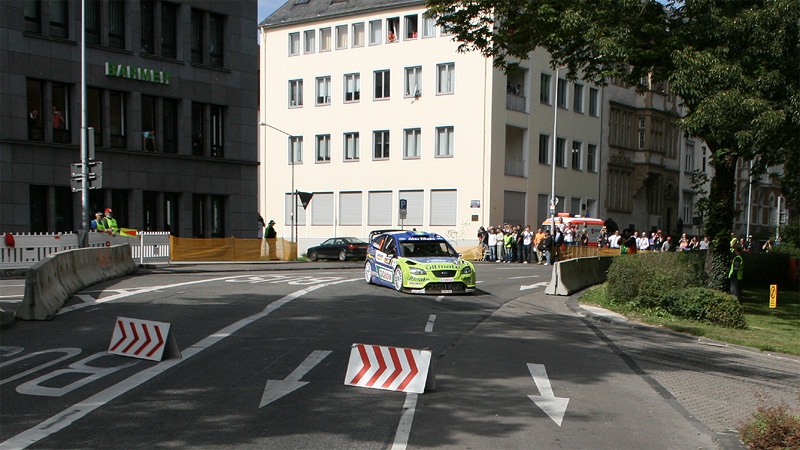
Marcus Grönholm at the "Circus Maximus" SSS of 2007 Rallye Deutschland.

The 2007 season started in good fashion for Grönholm. He claimed third place in the 75ème Rallye Automobile de Monte-Carlo behind the dominant returning works Citroens, and then the top spot in the Swedish Rally, mirroring the previous year's result. While the usually consummate Loeb tumbled out of the points from a potentially auspicious position in both Norway and Sardinia, Grönholm remained consistent and after winning for the 28th time in his career over the Citroen titan in Greece, led the championship by nine points over Loeb over the championship's summer break. At the 2007 Rally Finland, Ford secured a one-two with Grönholm taking the win and Hirvonen the second place ahead of Loeb. At the next rally, the 2007 Rallye Deutschland, Grönholm got distracted by a cow along the road and made a driving error while trying to secure a second place ahead of hard-charging François Duval, dropping him to fourth place behind his teammate.

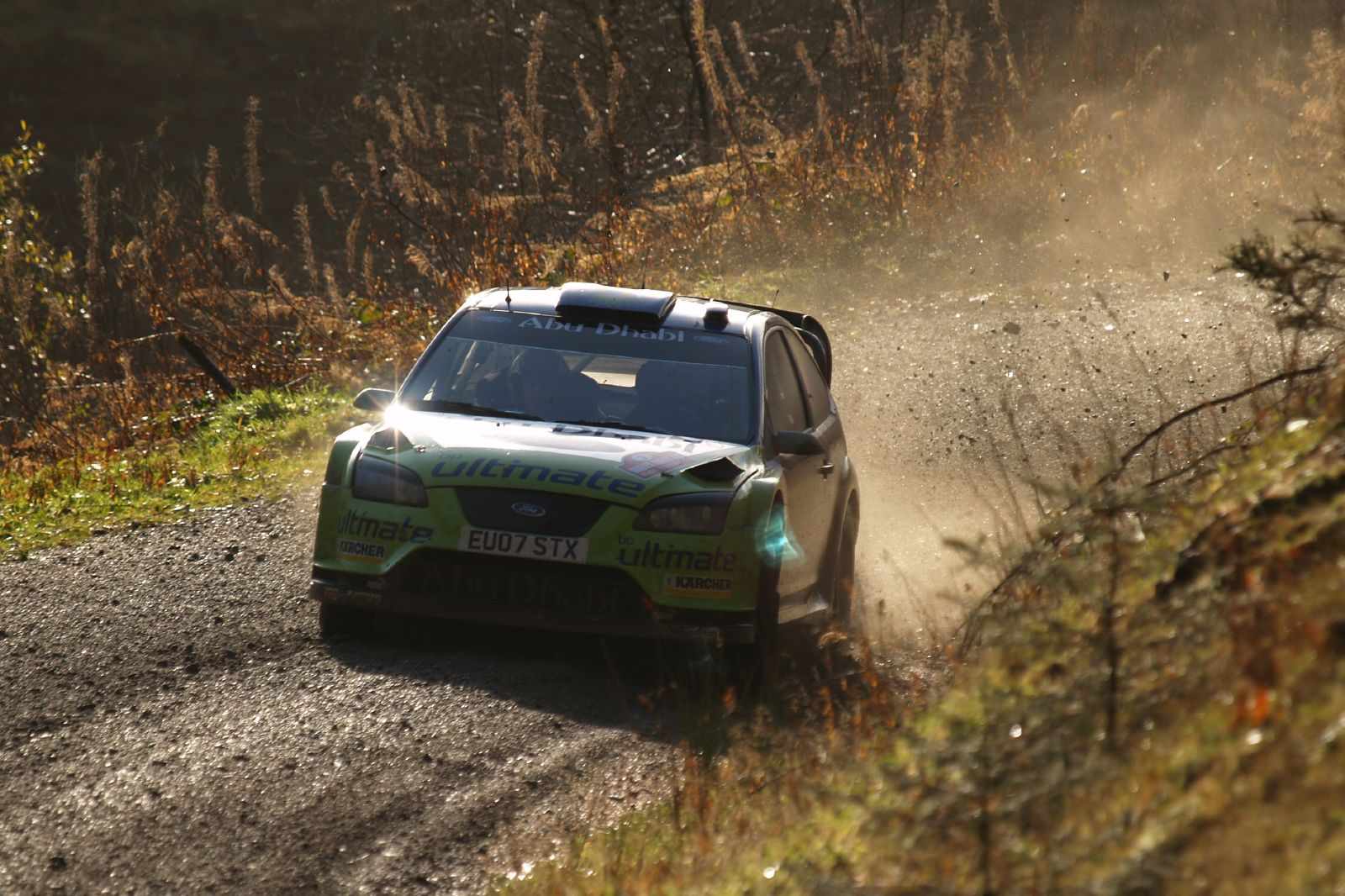
Grönholm in his last rally at the 2007 Wales Rally GB.

Then came New Zealand, where after a tight battle over all three legs, Grönholm took a victory of historic slenderness over Loeb. The final winning margin between the two represented the closest ever in the history of the World Rally Championship: 0.3 seconds. This victory put him ten points clear in the championship with five rounds remaining. Podium finishes in Spain and France kept him on track for the championship, but after crashing out early at both Japan and Ireland the championship lead switched back to Loeb. Second place at Wales Rally GB was not enough to dislodge Loeb and so Grönholm finished the season as runner-up.

On 14 September 2007, Grönholm announced long-rumoured plans to retire from rallying at the end of the 2007 season, stating that "I wanted to stop while I still had the speed to win rallies. I didn't want to leave the decision too late so that I wasn't capable of winning any longer", also citing the opportunity ahead of him to potentially retire as a three-time World Rally Champion.

=== Other success ===
Grönholm also won the 2002 Race of Champions, taking home the Henri Toivonen Memorial Trophy and earning the title "Champion of Champions". At the 2006 Race of Champions, he formed team Finland with Heikki Kovalainen and the pair won the Nations' Cup.

=== Rallycross ===
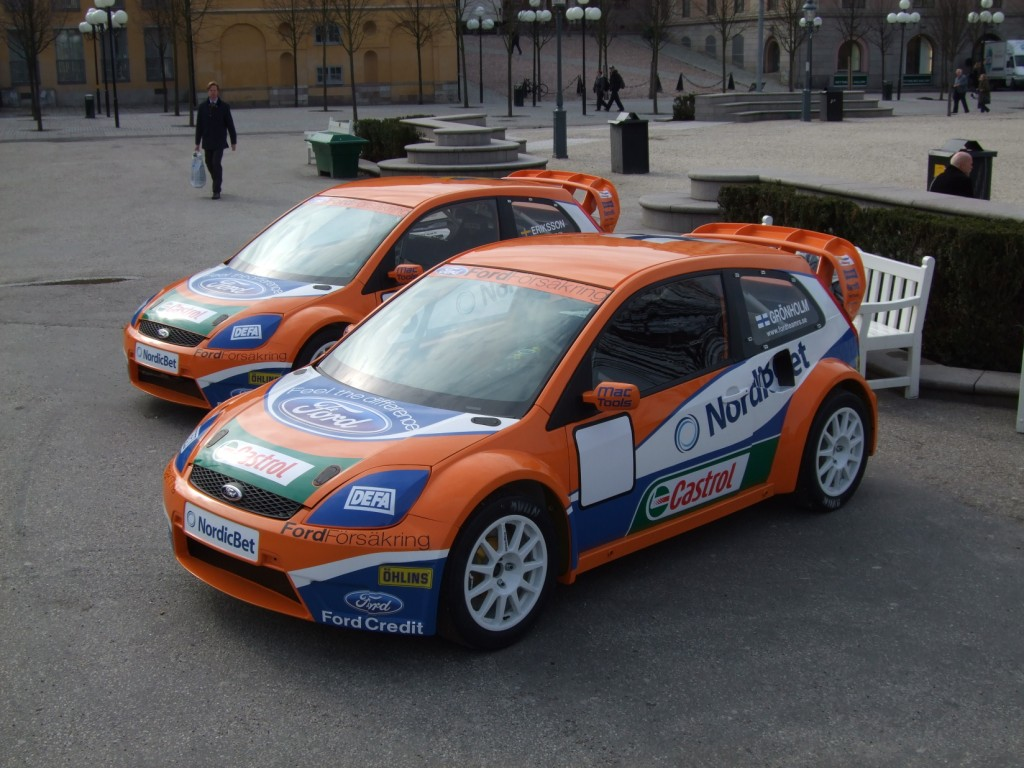
2008: The 560 bhp Ford Fiesta ST Rallycross cars of Marcus Grönholm and Andréas Eriksson in Stockholm

On April 16, 2008, Grönholm, at a press conference in the Kungsträdgården of Stockholm, announced a limited programme to take part in at least five rounds of the FIA European Championships for Rallycross Drivers (ERC). Grönholm participated in the series as team member of Andréas Eriksson's Ford Team RS Europe and, like the 2003 Swedish rally champion, drove a brand new 4WD Ford Fiesta ST European Rallycross Car (ERC) with 560 bhp (420 kW) and 800+ Nm torque that goes from 0 to 100 km/h in 2.2 seconds, faster than any current Formula One car. The programme was later reduced to three 2008 ERC rounds (Sweden, the Netherlands and Poland). Grönholm qualified on pole and went on to take the win in his ERC debut at Höljes in Sweden on July 6 in front of 23,400 spectators.

In 2011, Grönholm participated in the American Global RallyCross Championship (GRC) in a 560 bhp Best Buy Ford Fiesta Mk7 prepared by the Swedish company Olsbergs MSE. 2012 he continued in the GRC for the same team and car and started the season with two overall victories on two events. A career-ending injury took place during practice for the tjirdround, held at X Games Los Angeles 2012.

=== Later rally career ===
In August 2008, Grönholm turned down Stobart M-Sport Ford's offer to return to the WRC to replace the injured Gigi Galli. It was later reported that the factory teams of Citroën and Subaru both wanted to sign him for the 2009 season. In December, Grönholm and Subaru were reportedly close to signing to a full 12-event program, when the team re-structured the potential deal for financial reasons to include only four events, which did not interest Grönholm. Soon after, Subaru announced its shock withdrawal from the series due to the economic downturn.

Grönholm came out of retirement to contest the 2009 Rally Portugal in a Prodrive-prepared Subaru Impreza WRC2009. He stated that he was not aiming for the win and that "it will be fun to return [to the WRC], even in an ad hoc way, in a car that I don't know at all and after a year where I competed in some rallycross events." Despite this, Grönholm performed well and stayed in touch with the leaders; he was in 4th position when he crashed on Saturday's opening stage, damaging the car's engine and ending his rally.

Grönholm took part in the 2010 Rally Sweden driving a Ford Focus RS WRC 08 for Team Therminator, alongside countryman Matthias Therman. Grönholm was co-driven, as usual, by Timo Rautiainen. He finished the rally – the first round of the 2010 WRC season in 21st place after technical problems on stage 6 costing him 13 minutes making him drop down to 33rd then making all the way up again until he got to 24th place but then dropped again to 30th place because of a puncture costing him another seven minutes.

Grönholm made a return to the wheel of a Prodrive-run rally car in September 2010, when he test drove the Mini Countryman WRC in Portugal. Grönholm agreed to the test before taking any long-term decisions about his future. He also made a limited appearance in the 2019 World Rally Championship where he drove a Toyota Gazoo Racing-run Yaris under the GRX Team banner in the 2019 Rally Sweden.

== Personal life ==
Grönholm lives in Ingå with his wife Teresa and their three children. One of them is Niclas Grönholm, who currently competes in the FIA World Rallycross Championship. While Grönholm is a native speaker of Swedish, he is fully bilingual with Finnish and had his pace notes in the latter language.

Grönholm and his co-driver Timo Rautiainen are brothers-in-law. He is the cousin of Sebastian Lindholm.

Grönholm, along with Rautiainen, appeared in the first season of Amazing Race Suomi where they finished fifth place.

== Titles ==
Year	Title	Car
1991	Finnish champion (Group N)	Toyota Celica GT-Four ST165
1994	Finnish champion (Group A)	Toyota Celica Turbo 4WD
1996	Finnish champion (Group A)	Toyota Celica GT-Four ST205
1997	Finnish champion (Group A)	Toyota Celica GT-Four ST205
1998	Finnish champion (Group A)	Toyota Corolla WRC / Toyota Celica GT-Four
2000	World Rally Champion	Peugeot 206 WRC
2002	World Rally Champion	Peugeot 206 WRC
2002	Champion of Champions	Varies

== WRC wins ==
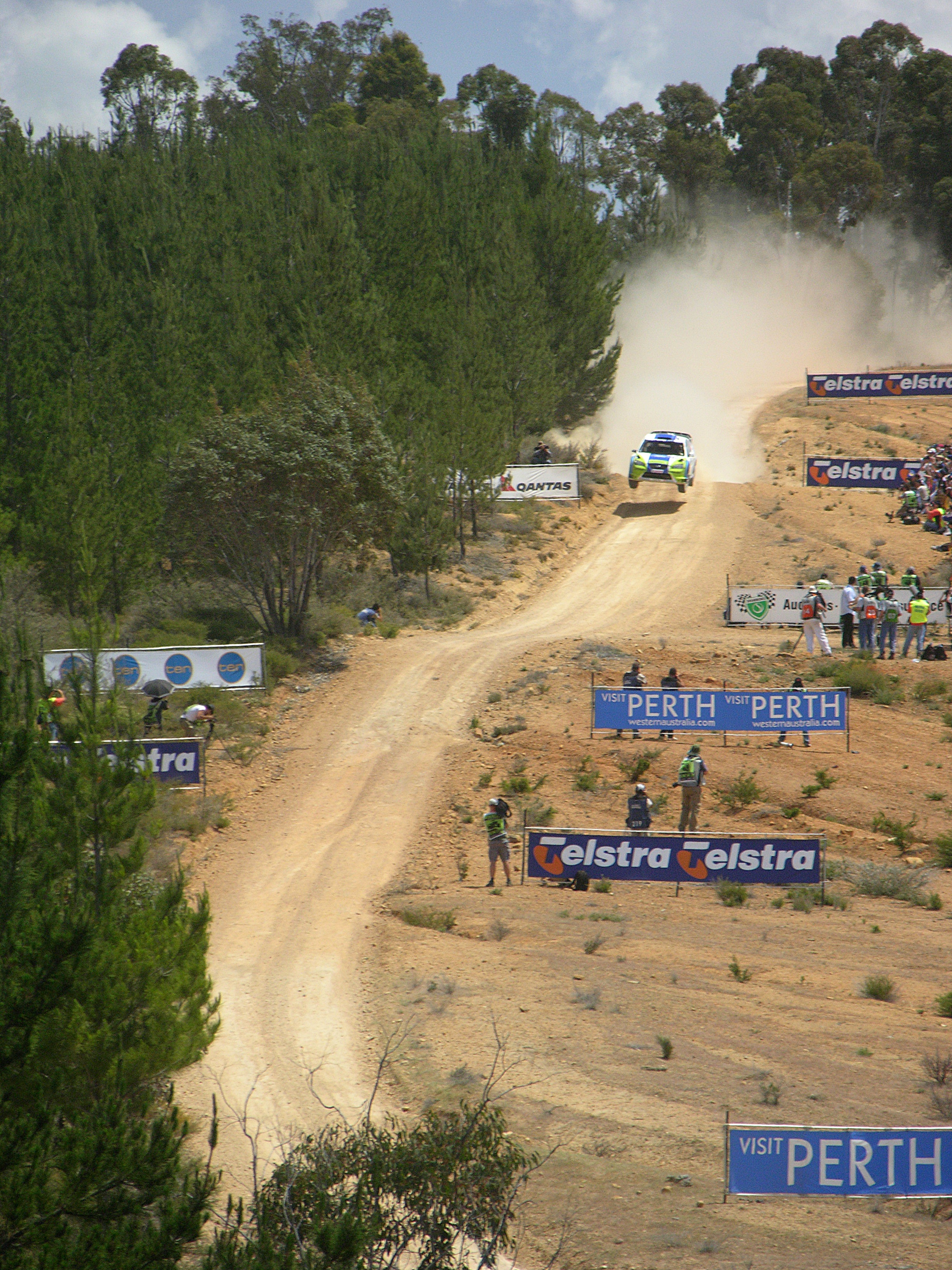
Grönholm at the famous Bunnings Jumps during the 2006 Rally Australia.

World Rally Championship victories (30)
#	Event	Season	Co-driver	Car
1	(Sweden) Swedish Rally	2000	Timo Rautiainen	Peugeot 206 WRC
2	Rally New Zealand	2000	Timo Rautiainen	Peugeot 206 WRC
3	Rally Finland	2000	Timo Rautiainen	Peugeot 206 WRC
4	Rally Australia	2000	Timo Rautiainen	Peugeot 206 WRC
5	Rally Finland	2001	Timo Rautiainen	Peugeot 206 WRC
6	Rally Australia	2001	Timo Rautiainen	Peugeot 206 WRC
7	(United Kingdom) Rally of Great Britain	2001	Timo Rautiainen	Peugeot 206 WRC
8	(Sweden) Swedish Rally	2002	Timo Rautiainen	Peugeot 206 WRC
9	Cyprus Rally	2002	Timo Rautiainen	Peugeot 206 WRC
10	Rally Finland	2002	Timo Rautiainen	Peugeot 206 WRC
11	Rally New Zealand	2002	Timo Rautiainen	Peugeot 206 WRC
12	Rally Australia	2002	Timo Rautiainen	Peugeot 206 WRC
13	(Sweden) Swedish Rally	2003	Timo Rautiainen	Peugeot 206 WRC
14	Rally New Zealand	2003	Timo Rautiainen	Peugeot 206 WRC
15	Rally Argentina	2003	Timo Rautiainen	Peugeot 206 WRC
16	Rally Finland	2004	Timo Rautiainen	Peugeot 307 WRC
17	Rally Finland	2005	Timo Rautiainen	Peugeot 307 WRC
18	Rally Japan	2005	Timo Rautiainen	Peugeot 307 WRC
19	(Monaco) Rallye Automobile Monte-Carlo	2006	Timo Rautiainen	Ford Focus RS WRC 06
20	(Sweden) Swedish Rally	2006	Timo Rautiainen	Ford Focus RS WRC 06
21	(Greece) Acropolis Rally	2006	Timo Rautiainen	Ford Focus RS WRC 06
22	Rally Finland	2006	Timo Rautiainen	Ford Focus RS WRC 06
23	Rally of Turkey	2006	Timo Rautiainen	Ford Focus RS WRC 06
24	Rally New Zealand	2006	Timo Rautiainen	Ford Focus RS WRC 06
25	(United Kingdom) Wales Rally GB	2006	Timo Rautiainen	Ford Focus RS WRC 06
26	(Sweden) Swedish Rally	2007	Timo Rautiainen	Ford Focus RS WRC 06
27	(Italy) Rally Italia Sardinia	2007	Timo Rautiainen	Ford Focus RS WRC 06
28	(Greece) Acropolis Rally	2007	Timo Rautiainen	Ford Focus RS WRC 06
29	Rally Finland	2007	Timo Rautiainen	Ford Focus RS WRC 07
30	Rally New Zealand	2007	Timo Rautiainen	Ford Focus RS WRC 07

== Racing record ==
=== Complete WRC results ===
Year	Entrant	Car	1	2	3	4	5	6	7	8	9	10	11	12	13	14	15	16	WDC	Points
1989	Marcus Grönholm	Lancia Delta Integrale	SWE	MON	POR	KEN	FRA	GRC	NZL	ARG	FIN; 23	AUS	ITA	CIV	GBR				NC	0
1990	Marcus Grönholm	Toyota Celica GT-Four ST165	MON	POR	KEN	FRA	GRC	NZL	ARG	FIN; Ret	AUS	ITA	CIV	GBR					NC	0
1991	Marcus Grönholm	Toyota Celica GT-Four ST165	MON	SWE	POR	KEN	FRA	GRC	NZL	ARG	FIN; 13	AUS	ITA	CIV	ESP	GBR			NC	0
1992	Finnish Junior Rally Team	Toyota Celica GT-Four ST165	MON	SWE; Ret	POR	KEN	FRA	GRC	NZL	ARG									NC	0
1992	Marcus Grönholm	Toyota Celica Turbo 4WD									FIN; Ret	AUS	ITA	CIV	ESP	GBR			NC	0
1993	Marcus Grönholm	Toyota Celica Turbo 4WD	MON	SWE	POR	KEN	FRA	GRC	ARG	NZL	FIN; 10	AUS	ITA	ESP	GBR				65th	1
1994	Marcus Grönholm	Toyota Celica Turbo 4WD	MON	POR	KEN	FRA	GRC	ARG	NZL	FIN; 5	ITA	GBR							19th	8
1995	Marcus Grönholm	Toyota Celica Turbo 4WD	MON	SWE; Ret		FRA	NZL; Ret	AUS	ESP	GBR									–	0
1995	H.F. Grifone	Toyota Celica Turbo 4WD			POR; Ret														–	0
1996	Marcus Grönholm	Toyota Celica Turbo 4WD	SWE; 7	KEN	IDN	GRC	ARG												10th	14
1996	Team Toyota Castrol Finland	Toyota Celica GT-Four ST205						FIN; 4	AUS	ITA	ESP								10th	14
1997	Toyota Castrol Team Sweden	Toyota Celica GT-Four ST205	MON	SWE; 8	KEN														12th	5
1997	Team Toyota Castrol Finland	Toyota Celica GT-Four ST205				POR; Ret	ESP	FRA											12th	5
1997	H.F. Grifone	Toyota Celica GT-Four ST205							ARG; 4	GRC	NZL								12th	5
1997	Toyota Castrol Team	Toyota Corolla WRC										FIN; Ret	IDN	ITA	AUS	GBR; 5			12th	5
1998	H.F. Grifone	Toyota Celica GT-Four ST205	MON	SWE; 5	KEN														16th	2
1998	H.F. Grifone	Toyota Corolla WRC				POR; Ret	ESP; Ret	FRA	ARG	GRC	NZL; Ret								16th	2
1998	Toyota Castrol Team	Toyota Corolla WRC										FIN; 7	ITA	AUS	GBR; Ret				16th	2
1999	SEAT Sport	SEAT Córdoba WRC	MON	SWE; Ret	KEN														15th	5
1999	Marlboro Mitsubishi Ralliart	Mitsubishi Carisma GT Evo VI				POR; Ret	ESP	FRA	ARG										15th	5
1999	Peugeot Esso	Peugeot 206 WRC								GRC; Ret	NZL	FIN; 4	CHN	ITA; 8	AUS; 5	GBR; Ret			15th	5
2000	Peugeot Esso	Peugeot 206 WRC	MON; Ret	SWE; 1	KEN; Ret	POR; 2	ESP; 5	ARG; 2	GRC; Ret	NZL; 1	FIN; 1	CYP; Ret	FRA; 5	ITA; 4	AUS; 1	GBR; 2			1st	65
2001	Peugeot Total	Peugeot 206 WRC	MON; Ret	SWE; Ret	POR; 3	ESP; Ret	ARG; Ret	CYP; Ret	GRC; Ret	KEN; Ret	FIN; 1	NZL; 5	ITA; 7	FRA; Ret	AUS; 1	GBR; 1			4th	36
2002	Peugeot Total	Peugeot 206 WRC	MON; 5	SWE; 1	FRA; 2	ESP; 4	CYP; 1	ARG; DSQ	GRC; 2	KEN; Ret	FIN; 1	GER; 3	ITA; 2	NZL; 1	AUS; 1	GBR; Ret			1st	77
2003	Marlboro Peugeot Total	Peugeot 206 WRC	MON; 13	SWE; 1	TUR; 9	NZL; 1	ARG; 1	GRC; Ret	CYP; Ret	GER; 2	FIN; Ret	AUS; Ret	ITA; Ret	FRA; 4	ESP; 6	GBR; Ret			6th	46
2004	Marlboro Peugeot Total	Peugeot 307 WRC	MON; 4	SWE; 2	MEX; 6	NZL; 2	CYP; DSQ	GRC; Ret	TUR; 2	ARG; Ret	FIN; 1	GER; Ret	JPN; 4	GBR; Ret	ITA; 7	FRA; 4	ESP; 2	AUS; Ret	5th	62
2005	Marlboro Peugeot Total	Peugeot 307 WRC	MON; 5	SWE; Ret	MEX; 2	NZL; 2	ITA; 3	CYP; Ret	TUR; 3	GRC; 4	ARG; 2	FIN; 1	GER; 3	GBR; Ret	JPN; 1	FRA; Ret	ESP; Ret	AUS; Ret	3rd	71
2006	BP Ford World Rally Team	Ford Focus RS WRC 06	MON; 1	SWE; 1	MEX; 8	ESP; 3	FRA; 2	ARG; 10	ITA; Ret	GRC; 1	GER; 3	FIN; 1	JPN; 2	CYP; 2	TUR; 1	AUS; 5	NZL; 1	GBR; 1	2nd	111
2007	BP Ford World Rally Team	Ford Focus RS WRC 06	MON; 3	SWE; 1	NOR; 2	MEX; 2	POR; 4	ARG; 2	ITA; 1	GRC; 1									2nd	112
2007	BP Ford World Rally Team	Ford Focus RS WRC 07									FIN; 1	GER; 4	NZL; 1	ESP; 3	FRA; 2	JPN; Ret	IRE; Ret	GBR; 2	2nd	112
2009	Prodrive	Subaru Impreza WRC2008	IRE	NOR	CYP	POR; Ret	ARG	ITA	GRE	POL	FIN	AUS	ESP	GBR					NC	0
2010	Stobart VK M-Sport Ford Rally Team	Ford Focus RS WRC 08	SWE; 21	MEX	JOR	TUR	NZL	POR	BUL	FIN	DEU	JPN	FRA	ESP	GBR				NC	0
2019	GRX Team	Toyota Yaris WRC	MON	SWE; 38	MEX	FRA	ARG	CHL	POR	ITA	FIN	GER	TUR	GBR	ESP	AUS; C			NC	0

=== WRC summary ===
Season	Team	Starts	Victories	Podiums	Stage wins	DNF	Points	Final result
1989	Private	1	0	0	0	0	0	NC
1990	Private	1	0	0	0	1	0	NC
1991	Private	1	0	0	0	0	0	NC
1992	Finnish Junior Rally Team	1	0	0	0	0	0	NC
1992	Private	1	0	0	1	1	0	NC
1993	Private	1	0	0	0	0	1	65th
1994	Private	1	0	0	0	0	8	19th
1995	Private	2	0	0	0	2	0	NC
1995	H.F. Grifone	1	0	0	0	1	0	NC
1996	Private	1	0	0	0	0	4	10th
1996	Team Toyota Castrol Finland	1	0	0	0	0	10	10th
1997	Toyota Castrol Team	2	0	0	5	1	2	12th
1997	H.F. Grifone	1	0	0	1	0	3	12th
1997	Toyota Castrol Team Sweden	1	0	0	0	0	0	12th
1997	Toyota Castrol Team Finland	1	0	0	0	1	0	12th
1998	H.F. Grifone	4	0	0	1	3	2	16th
1998	Toyota Castrol Team	2	0	0	8	1	0	16th
1999	Peugeot Esso	5	0	0	9	2	5	15th
1999	SEAT Sport	1	0	0	0	1	0	15th
1999	Marlboro Mitsubishi Ralliart	1	0	0	0	1	0	15th
2000	Peugeot Esso	14	4	7	42	4	65	1st
2001	Peugeot Total	14	3	4	34	8	36	4th
2002	Peugeot Total	14	5	9	69	2	77	1st
2003	Marlboro Peugeot Total	14	3	4	50	6	46	6th
2004	Marlboro Peugeot Total	16	1	5	71	5	62	5th
2005	Marlboro Peugeot Total	16	2	8	55	6	71	3rd
2006	BP Ford World Rally Team	16	7	12	124	1	111	2nd
2007	BP Ford World Rally Team	16	5	12	76	2	112	2nd
2009	Prodrive	1	0	0	0	1	0	NC
2010	Stobart VK M-Sport Ford Rally Team	1	0	0	1	0	0	NC
2019	GRX Team	1	0	0	0	0	0	NC
Total		153	30	61	547	50	615	

=== Complete FIA European Rallycross Championship results ===
==== Division 1 ====
Year	Entrant	Car	1	2	3	4	5	6	7	8	9	10	11	ERX	Points
2008	Ford Team RS Europe	Ford Fiesta ST	POR	FRA	HUN	AUT	NOR	SWE; 1	BEL	NED; 10	CZE	POL; 12	GER	16th	32

=== Complete Global RallyCross Championship results ===
==== AWD ====
Year	Entrant	Car	1	2	3	4	5	6	7	8	GRC	Points
2011	Best Buy Mobile Olsbergs MSE	Ford Fiesta	IRW1; 1	IRW2; 1	OLD1	OLD2	PIK1; 2	PIK2; 1	LA1; 2	LA2; 3	2nd	112

==== Supercar ====
Year	Entrant	Car	1	2	3	4	5	6	GRC	Points
2012	Best Buy Mobile Olsbergs MSE	Ford Fiesta	CHA; 1	TEX; 1	LA	NH	LVS	LVC	7th	43

Awards and achievements
Preceded by Richard Burns	Autosport; International Rally Driver Award; 2002	Succeeded by Petter Solberg
Preceded by Sébastien Loeb	Autosport; International Rally Driver Award; 2007	Succeeded by Sébastien Loeb
Sporting positions
Preceded by Tommi Mäkinen	World Rally Champion; 2000	Succeeded by Richard Burns
Preceded by Richard Burns	World Rally Champion; 2002	Succeeded by Petter Solberg
Preceded by Harri Rovanperä	Race of Champions; Champion of Champions; 2002	Succeeded by Sébastien Loeb
Preceded by Tom Kristensen; Mattias Ekström	Race of Champions; Nations' Cup; 2006 with: Heikki Kovalainen	Succeeded by Michael Schumacher; Sebastian Vettel
