= Rally Finland =

Motor rally competition

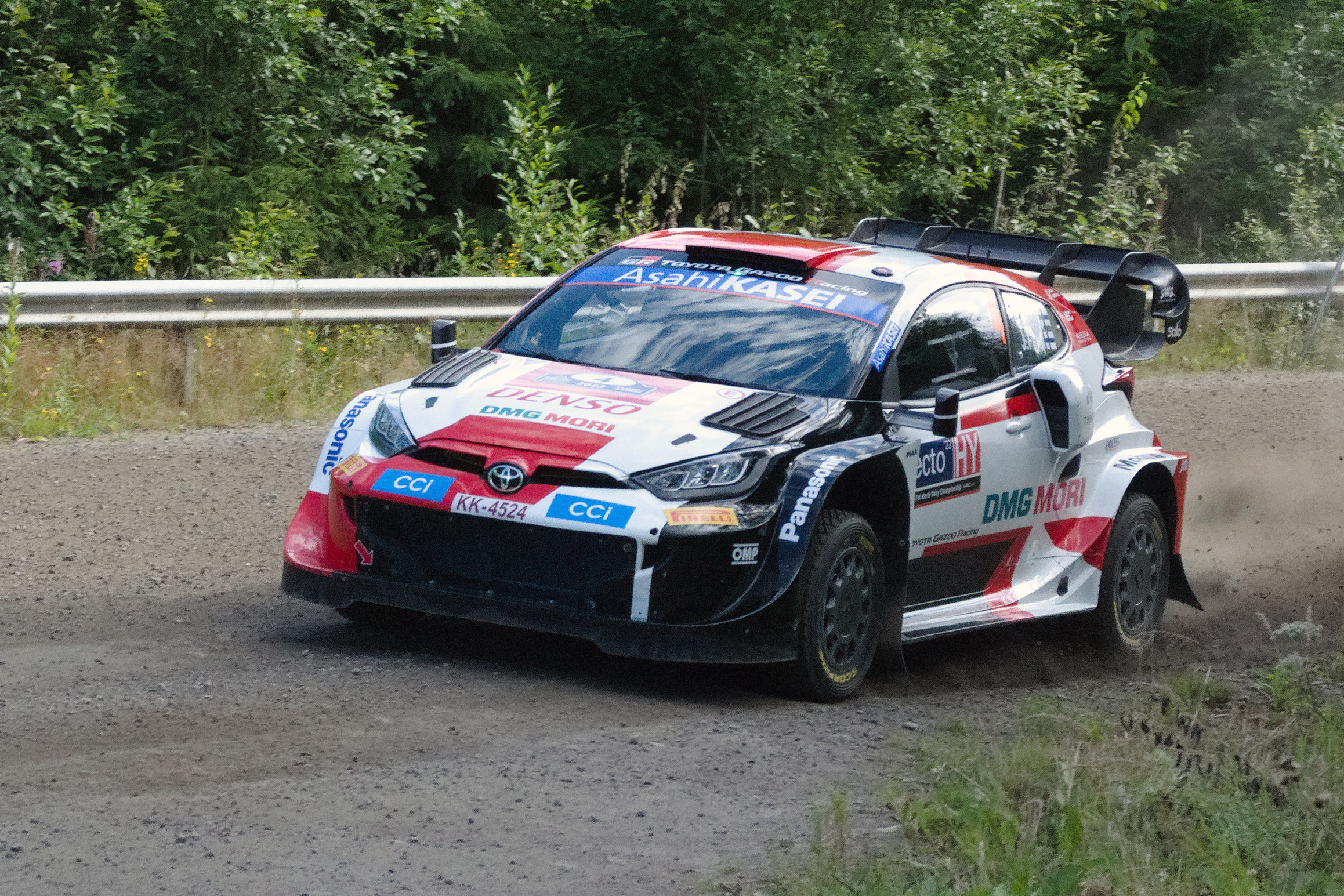
- Esapekka Lappi at the 2022 Rally Finland
- Status: Active
- Genre: Motorsporting event
- Date: July–August
- Frequency: Annual
- Location: Finnish Lakeland
- Country: Finland
- Inaugurated: 1951

Rally Finland (officially Secto Rally Finland; formerly known as the Neste Rally Finland, Neste Oil Rally Finland, 1000 Lakes Rally and Rally of the Thousand Lakes; Finnish: Suomen ralli, Swedish: Finska rallyt) is a rally competition in the Finnish Lakeland in Central Finland. The rally is driven on wide and smooth gravel roads, featuring blind crests and big jumps. It is the fastest event in the World Rally Championship and has been dubbed the "Grand Prix of Rallying" and the "Grand Prix on Gravel". Rally Finland is among the largest annually organised public events in the Nordic countries, attracting hundreds of thousands of spectators each year. The rally has been known to be very difficult for non-Nordic drivers; only eight drivers from countries other than Finland or Sweden have won the event. In the 1980s and earlier, the field was made up almost entirely of Finnish and Swedish drivers.

The city of Jyväskylä in the Central Finland region has often served as the main venue for Finnish rally competitions, because Rally Finland was first held under the name Jyväskylän Suurajot (Jyväskylä Grand Prix) in 1951. Originally an endurance event that stretched to Lapland in Northern Finland, the rally was at the forefront of the adoption of the modern rally format, splitting the route into a number of special stages in the mid-1950s. With increasing international attention, it became part of the European Rally Championship programme in 1959. After the start of the World Rally Championship in 1973, the event became the Finnish round in the series. Rally Finland is now among the most popular and prestigious rallies in the championship.

== History ==
This rally began to gain importance in the 1970s, and local heroes such as Hannu Mikkola, Markku Alén, Timo Salonen, Tommi Mäkinen and Marcus Grönholm are the most successful names at this rally, and Swedish drivers such as Stig Blomqvist also found success at this rally. The difficulty of this rally for non-Nordic drivers made notable competitors such as Walter Röhrl (who never competed at this rally) and Miki Biasion (who only competed at this rally twice in his 15-year career) make rare or no appearances at this rally.

=== 1950s ===
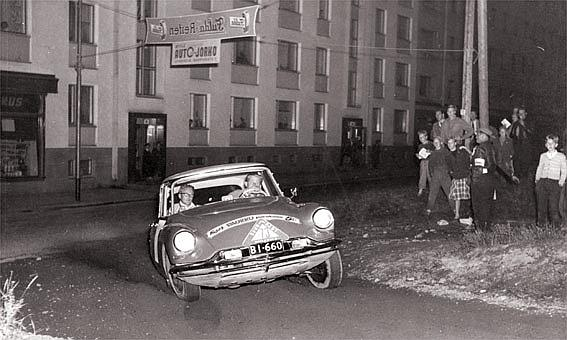
Citroën DS 19 driven in 1956

Rally Finland was started as a quickly improvised qualifier event for the Monte Carlo Rally; thirty Finnish drivers wanted to take part in Monte Carlo, but only 14 were able to fit within the quotas on Finns and Swedes. Previously, the entries had been decided in the Hanko Run in Southern Finland. The regulations in this race were not close to those of the Monte Carlo Rally, leading to a demand for a Monte Carlo type of rally in Finland. In July 1951, Pentti Barck's proposal for an annual competition in Jyväskylä was accepted. The first-ever rally began on 1 September 1951 as Jyväskylän Suurajot (Jyväskylä Grand Prix). 26 entrants tackled the 1,700 kilometre (1,060 mi) route that stretched to Rovaniemi in Lapland, through Kokkola and Oulu, and back to the rally headquarters in Jyväskylä. The winner Arvo Karlsson, driving an Austin Atlantic, had accumulated the least penalty points and had been the closest to the target times throughout the route and the special tests involving hillclimbing and acceleration.

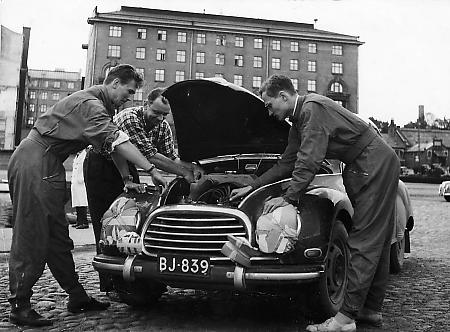
Osmo Kalpala servicing his DKW F93 during the 1956 rally.

The 1952 event included Helsinki as an alternative starting point and the field expanded to 48 entries. Eino Elo was the only driver to finish the route and the acceleration and braking tests without penalty points. In 1953, Oulu was added as a third starting point, and 66 crews started the 2,200 kilometre course in two-minute intervals. The 1954 running of the rally saw the introduction of the international name "The Rally of the Thousand Lakes". There were now eleven starting cities, one of which was Sundsvall in neighbouring Sweden. In 1955, the event became increasingly closer to the format of a modern rally competition; the number of special stages was increased to eleven, marking the highest amount in any European rally. Elo and Peugeot became the first two-time winners of the event. The 1956 rally featured 19 stages totaling 1,800 kilometres (1,100 mi).

In 1957, the rally had a record number of entries from foreign countries and the organisers developed a sign language that marshals could use to communicate with drivers. The event also started the Finland-Sweden international in rallying, comparable to the traditional Finland-Sweden athletics international. Sweden's Erik Carlsson drove his Saab 93 to victory as the first non-Finn. In the 1958 1000 Lakes, documented by a 20th Century Fox film crew, seven drivers crashed out on the same curve on a foggy night. Brothers Osmo and Eino Kalpala took a record third win in an Alfa Romeo Giulietta TI, which marked the first victory for an Italian car. In 1959, the 1000 Lakes Rally was included in the European Rally Championship calendar. It was also one of the four rallies that counted towards the first-ever Finnish Rally Championship.

=== 1960s ===
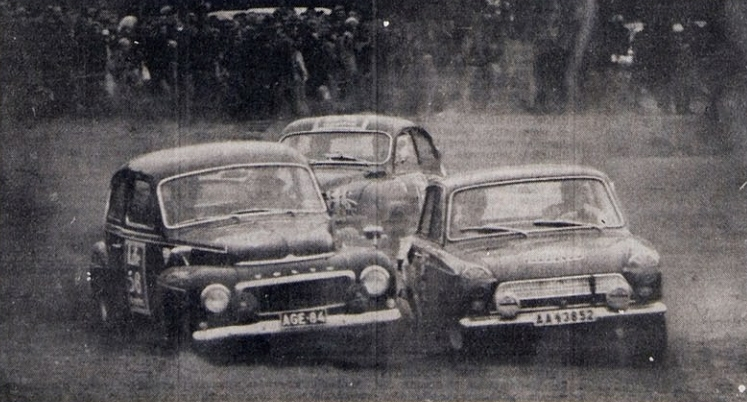
Leo Kinnunen and Bengt Söderström during the Hippos circuit stage in 1964

At the 1960 1000 Lakes Rally, nearly half of the 85 entries were from foreign countries. A deaf-mute road worker was hit by Germany's future European champion Eugen Böhringer in what was the event's first fatal accident. Although the rally ended with Finland's Carl-Otto Bremer leading home a Saab triple win, the best Finn had been only tenth after the opening Harju hill stage. Later in the 1960s, the 1000 Lakes was dominated by the first generation of "Flying Finns" of rallying. Rauno Aaltonen beat Pauli Toivonen to the win in 1961, while Toivonen took the honours in 1962. Esko Keinänen and Rainer Eklund finished second in a Škoda Felicia. A record 104 drivers started the 1962 event. Simo Lampinen, barely twenty years old, became the first driver to take consecutive wins, finishing ahead of Sweden's Tom Trana in 1963 and 1964.

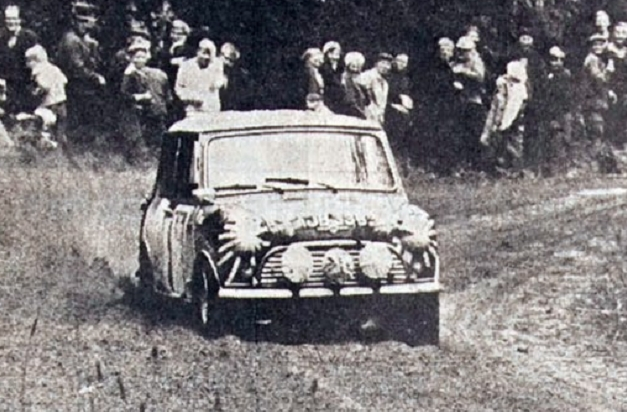
Timo Mäkinen drives a Mini in 1965.

Interest in the 1000 Lakes Rally continued to grow. It became known as the best organised rally competition after the Monte Carlo Rally, and as Finland's biggest sporting event by audience count. As practice had been allowed for 1965, speeds became higher than ever. These factors brought several challenges to the organisers. Spectators lined up the edge of the course and sometimes even blocked the road. One spectator was killed in a crash in 1965. 1,200 officials were appointed for the 1965 event, over 2,000 for 1967 and over 3,000 for 1968. As the organisers and the gravel roads could not handle fields close to 200 cars, only 130 of the 173 entries qualified for the start in 1965. In 1966, entries were only accepted from drivers who had finished in at least three rallies.

Along with the number of entrants, the percentage of retirements grew steadily throughout the decade, and 1966 saw nearly half of the 115 drivers fail to finish the 26 stages. Timo Mäkinen, who had already won in Monte Carlo, drove his Mini Cooper S to victory in 1965 and continued the success in 1966. In 1967, he beat Lampinen to the win by eight seconds despite driving the high-speed Ouninpohja stage with his bonnet open. His hat-trick of wins was followed by Hannu Mikkola's successes in a Ford Escort TC. In 1968, Castrol produced a film titled Flying Finns, documenting the duel between Mäkinen and Mikkola. The 1969 rally saw the circuit and street stages, which favoured faster sports cars and factory team drivers, dropped from the programme.

=== 1970s ===
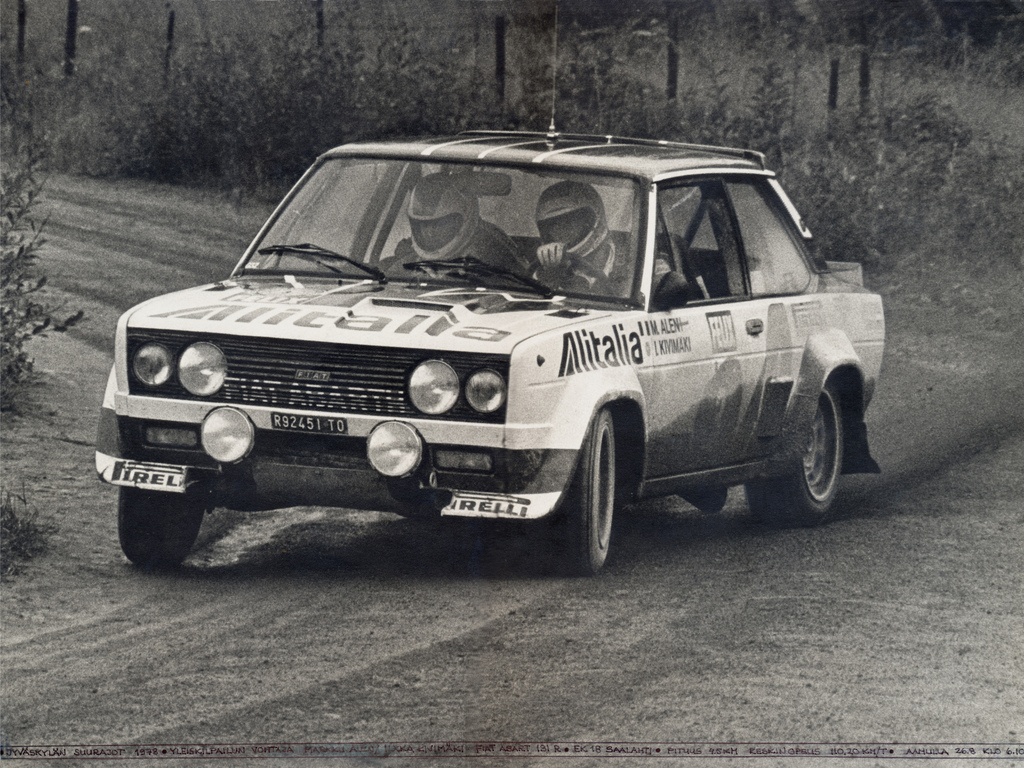
Markku Alén drives a Fiat 131 Abarth

The 1970 1000 Lakes had a record 52 stages, which totaled 460 competitive kilometres. An estimated audience of 350,000–500,000 spectators watched Mikkola match Mäkinen's feat of three wins in a row. However, the event suffered a drop in the number of foreign entries, which the international press attributed to the difficulty of defeating the Finns on their own roads. In 1971, the rally was won by a Swedish driver for the third time; Stig Blomqvist finished well ahead of Tapio Rainio and Markku Alén. The 1972 event increased the length of special stages to almost 700 km. The traditional Harju hill stage was left out of the route as Jyväskylä had banned racing in the city area.

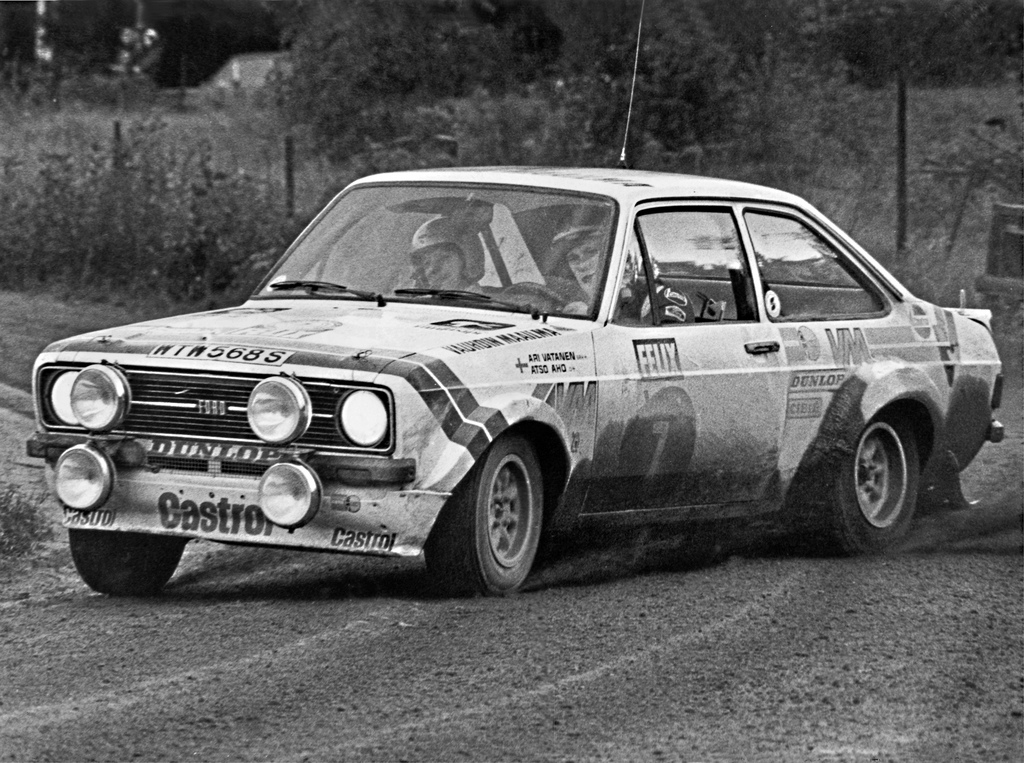
Ari Vatanen with a Ford Escort RS1800 in 1978

The 1000 Lakes was not among the five European rallies guaranteed a spot in the inaugural World Rally Championship calendar. It competed for the remaining three Europe-based entries with the Coupe des Alpes (Alpine Rally), Österreichische Alpenfahrt (Austrian Alpine Rally), Rally Poland and Rallye de Portugal. The number of rallies in the 1973 season was eventually expanded to 13 and only Coupe des Alpes was dropped. The 1973 1000 Lakes Rally ended with Ford's Timo Mäkinen becoming the first driver to win the event four times, and the first Finn to win a WRC round. Alén finished second in a Volvo and future Formula One driver Leo Kinnunen third in a Porsche. The world championship status had brought back a strong international field of about 50 teams from 13 different countries. The 1974 event was marred by the first fatal accident for a competitor in the World Rally Championship, after co-driver Seppo Jämsä died of injuries sustained in a crash in Ouninpohja.

The rally route became a secret again in 1975, and pre-event practice was heavily limited. Mikkola drove to a record fifth victory and Toyota became the first Japanese manufacturer to win the event. The 1977 and 1978 rallies were, in addition to the WRC, part of the FIA Cup for Rally Drivers, the predecessor to the drivers' world championship. In 1978, the course stretched to Kuopio and as a result 25 of the 45 special stages were new. The 1979 1000 Lakes raised the highest number of accepted entries to 150, and all 134 competitors could start the rally. World championship points were now awarded for drivers as well as for manufacturers. Fiat's Alén collected most by taking his third win in the event, ahead of Ari Vatanen and eventual champion Björn Waldegård.

=== 1980s ===
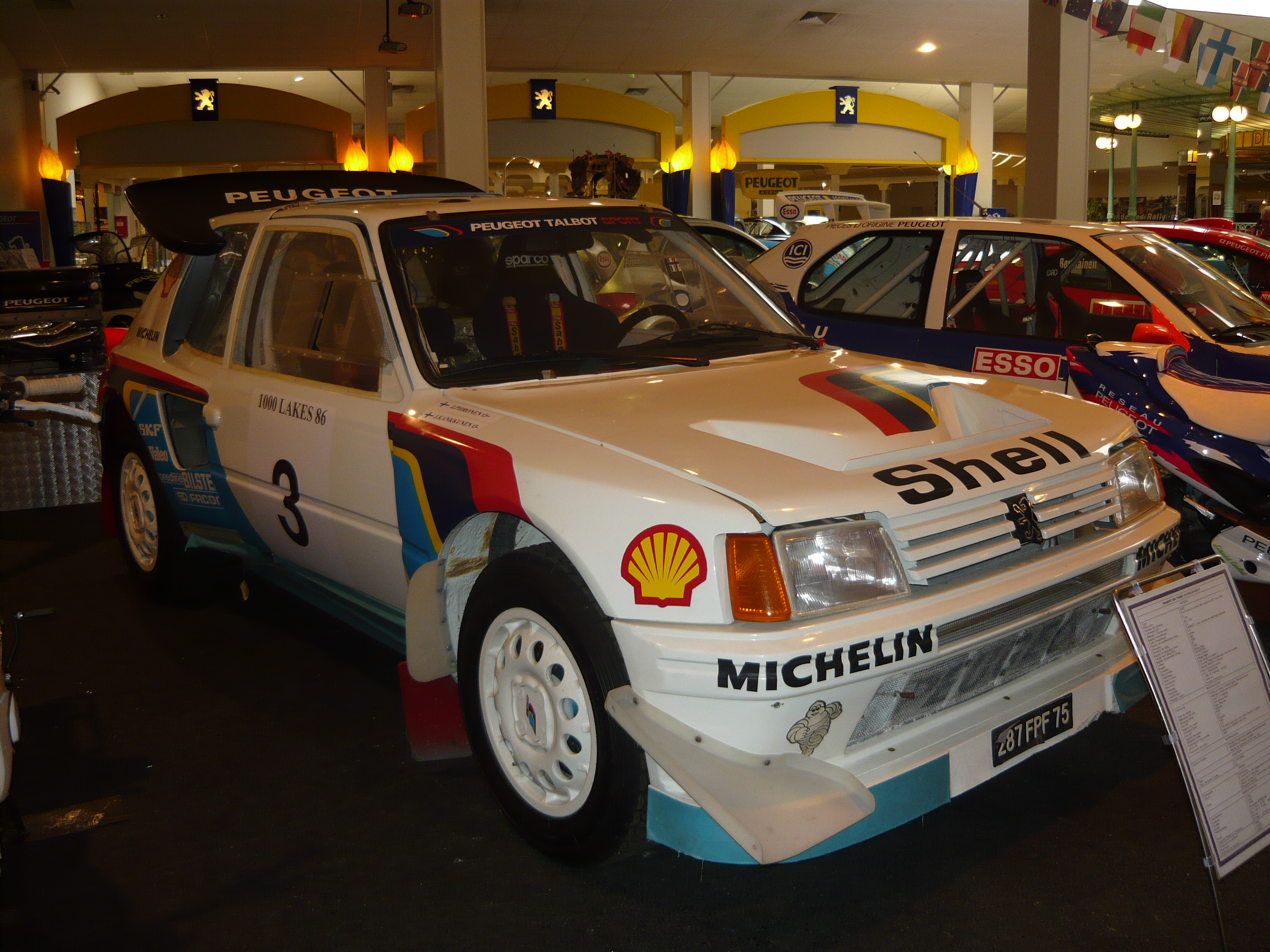
Juha Kankkunen's Peugeot 205 T16 E2 of the 1986 event

For the 1980 season, the 1000 Lakes Rally lost its status as a world championship event for manufacturers, running for the first and last time only as a world drivers' championship event. The rally saw the return of the short Harju asphalt stage held in the center of Jyväskylä. Although the rally became the first in the world to issue action and safety instructions in 1980, several serious accidents marred the event in the early 1980s. At the 1981 rally, Austrian driver Franz Wittmann lost control of his Audi Quattro after the finish line of the fourth stage and crashed into five end-of-stage officials. Raul Falin, the chairman of AKK-Motorsport, died of his injuries soon after reaching the hospital. In 1983, Pekka Mällinen slid off the road on a fast curve, rolled twice and crashed into a thick pine tree. The accident killed his co-driver Reijo Nygren. At the 1984 rally, British driver Julian Roderick lost control of his car on a popular spectator area in the Humalamäki jumpers. He rolled his car several times and hit a wall of people who had been spectating in a forbidden area. Along with Roderick and his co-driver, nine spectators suffered non-critical injuries.

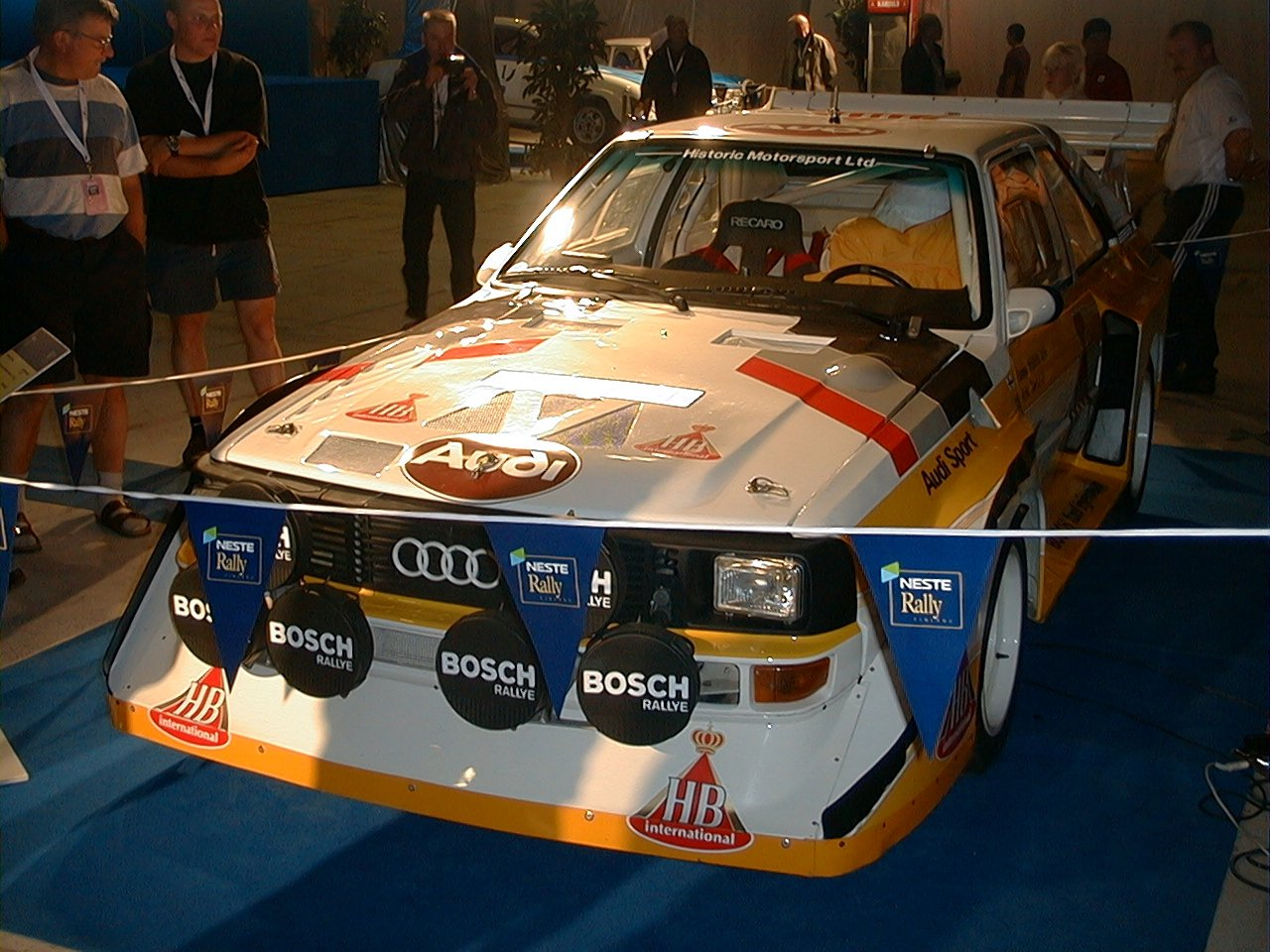
The Audi Quattro S1 used by Hannu Mikkola during tests for the 1985 rally

Although the 1000 Lakes continued to be dominated by Nordic drivers, David Richards became the third British co-driver to celebrate the win in 1981. In 1982, the pre-rally scrutineering was moved to the newly built Jyväskylän jäähalli (Jyväskylä Ice Hall). All over 150 contestants passed the inspection. King Carl XVI Gustaf of Sweden arrived to follow the event and a record 450 reporters were present. Dominant Audi took a one-two with its factory drivers Hannu Mikkola and Stig Blomqvist, with team orders keeping them in their positions for the last half of the race. The 1983 rally featured a field of 180 cars, over a hundred of which failed to make it to the finish. Mikkola edged out Blomqvist to extend the event record to a still-standing seven wins. Mikkola's time on the 24.5-kilometre (15.2 mi) Ouninpohja stage was 11:56; 52 seconds faster than his time just four years ago. In 1984, over half a million spectators were expected and about 5,000 marshals were appointed. Vatanen won the event and Peugeot continued their success in the last two Group B years, as Timo Salonen drove to victory in 1985 and 1986.

The 1985 event marked the first time the drivers' world championship had been decided in Finland; Salonen captured the title with three rallies to go. In 1986, the route was modified to bring the average speeds closer to the FISA limit of 110 km/h. The top drivers exceeded the limit almost regularly, but FISA had given the organisers a 10 percent flexibility. Combined with their dislike for the slower Group A cars, drivers were highly critical of the organisers for artificially slowing the rally in 1987. A record 214 drivers signed up for the 1988 event and 200 were qualified to start by the organisers. Albert II, Prince of Monaco arrived to follow the event and was scheduled to drive a few stages in an ex-Alén Lancia. In one of the tightest duels in the event's history, Toyota's Juha Kankkunen led Lancia's Markku Alén by just two seconds after 33 of the 39 stages. Kankkunen's engine failed on the next stage, and Alén became the first driver to win the same WRC round six times. As a taste of what was to come, only two Finnish drivers made it into top ten. In 1989, Mikael Ericsson of Sweden drove to victory as the first non-Finn in 18 years.

=== 1990s ===
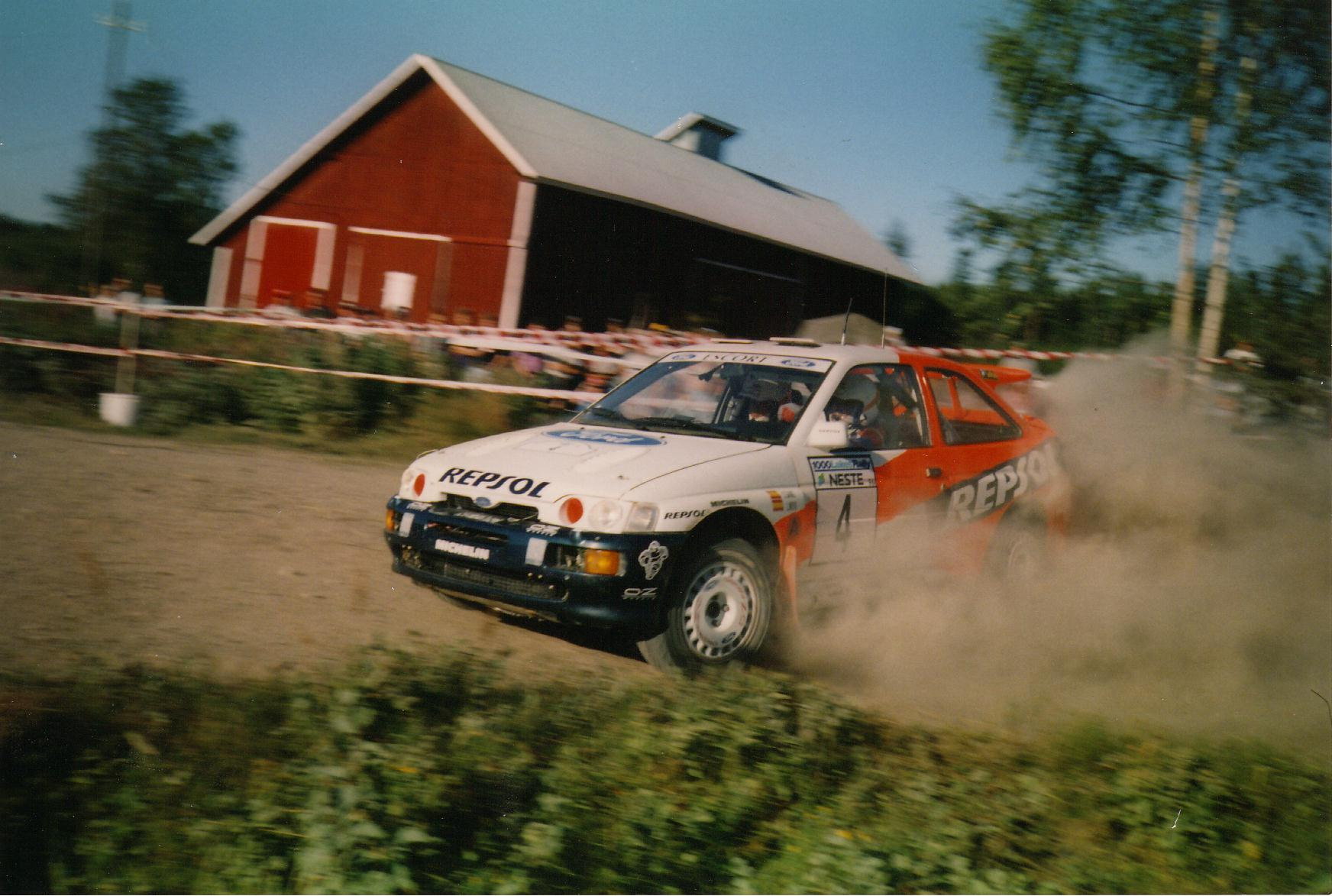
Carlos Sainz, the first non-Nordic winner behind the wheel of an Gr.A Escort RS Cosworth in 1996

The 40th anniversary event in 1990 featured a route stretching to Tampere and gathered a large audience, roughly estimated at 450,000–500,000. Toyota's Spanish driver Carlos Sainz became the first competitor outside Finland and Sweden to win the rally. He had been slightly injured earlier during the week, when he crashed during a night-time practice run in the Vesala stage. Sainz's feat was soon repeated; Didier Auriol, who had become the first Frenchman on the podium in his debut in 1988, beat his Lancia teammate Kankkunen to the win in 1992. Kankkunen took his second win in three years in 1993. In 1994, the rally was renamed to Neste 1000 Lakes Rally as Neste became the title sponsor. A new super special stage was built at a slope of the Himos ski centre in Jämsä and it quickly proved popular among spectators.

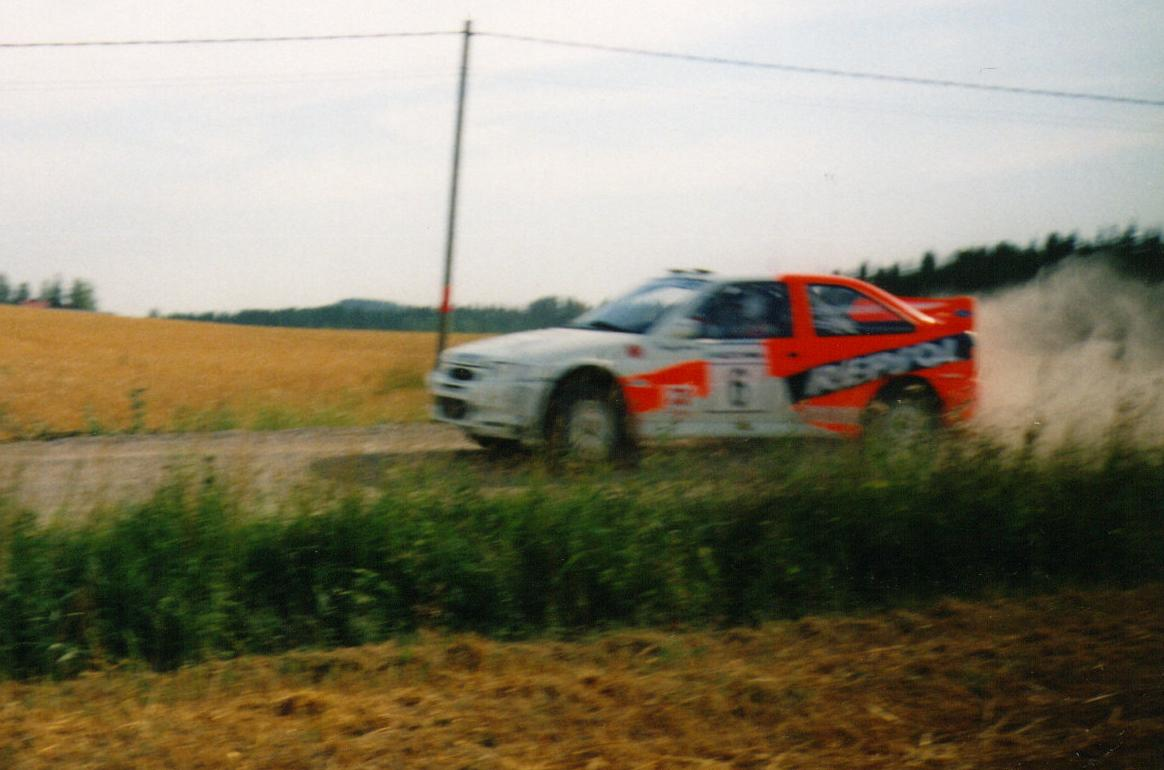
Kankkunen behind the wheel of an Escort WRC #6 in 1997

Due to the WRC round rotation from 1994 to 1996, the 1995 Rally Finland was only part of the 2-litre World Cup (better known as Formula 2). As a result, audience numbers dropped. The event was also overshadowed by a fatal accident. During the rainy and windy Hassi stage, a 20-year-old spectator did not hear the zero car driven by Bruno Thiry coming. Although Thiry was able to dodge into a ditch, his car bounced back on the road and hit the woman at 100–120 kilometres per hour (62–75 mph). She flew 50 metres (160 ft) down the road and succumbed to her injuries within minutes. Next year in Harju, Danish driver Karsten Richardt carried far too much speed into a right-hander. After hitting a bump and getting airborne, he missed the curve and went straight, hitting a road sign and a concrete barrier. Uncontrollably airborne, his car eventually plunged into the crowd 70 metres (230 ft) off the course. 29 spectators were brought to the hospital. 45-year-old Belgian tourist Ludo Briers was operated on within 38 minutes, but his injuries soon proved fatal. Before being hit, Briers had pushed one spectator to safety and protected another with his body. In a subdued celebration, drivers from Central Finland manned the podium; Tommi Mäkinen took his third win in a row, ahead of Kankkunen and Jarmo Kytölehto.

In 1997, AKK Sports, the marketing company of AKK-Motorsport, took over as the organiser and the WRC teams awarded the event for its safety efforts. A new super special stage was built at Hippos, along with a VIP village for 1,600 people. In the following year, teams voted the event as the Rally of the Year. On his way to a record third consecutive title, Mäkinen set a record with his fifth Rally Finland win in a row. Entry lists included ice hockey star and auto racing enthusiast Teemu Selänne, who finished 33rd in 1997 and 24th in 1998. The event also attracted environmental criticism throughout the decade; protests gathered about a hundred participants in 1997 and two hundred in 1998. In a 1997 study by the University of Jyväskylä, partly funded by AKK, Jyväskylä and Rally Finland, the environmental impact was estimated to be small; the noise from the rally cars, helicopters and speakers was considered the biggest harm. In 1999, Harju was dropped from the route and extra points were awarded to the three fastest drivers of the Ruuhimäki stage, which was televised live by Yle to millions around the world.

=== 2000s ===
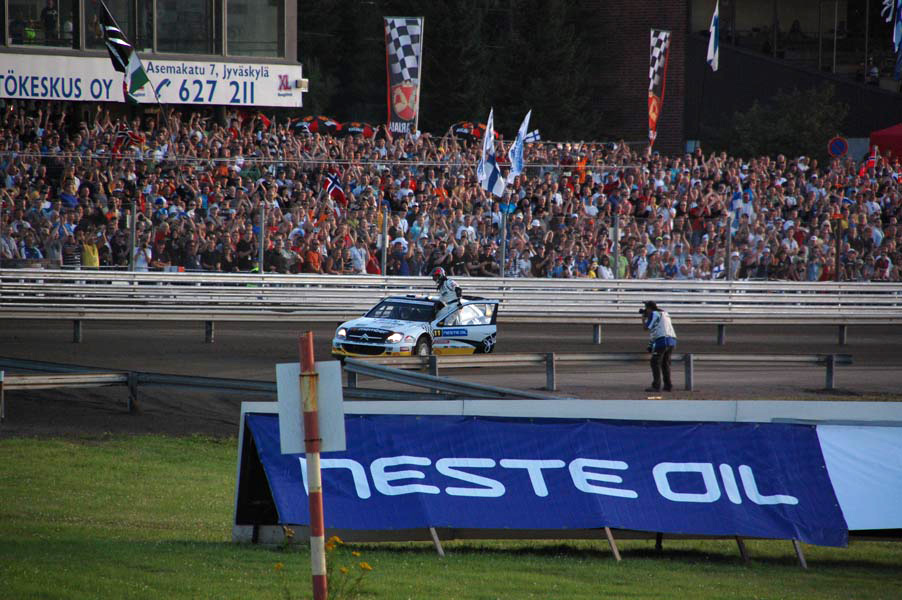
Petter Solberg on the Killeri stage

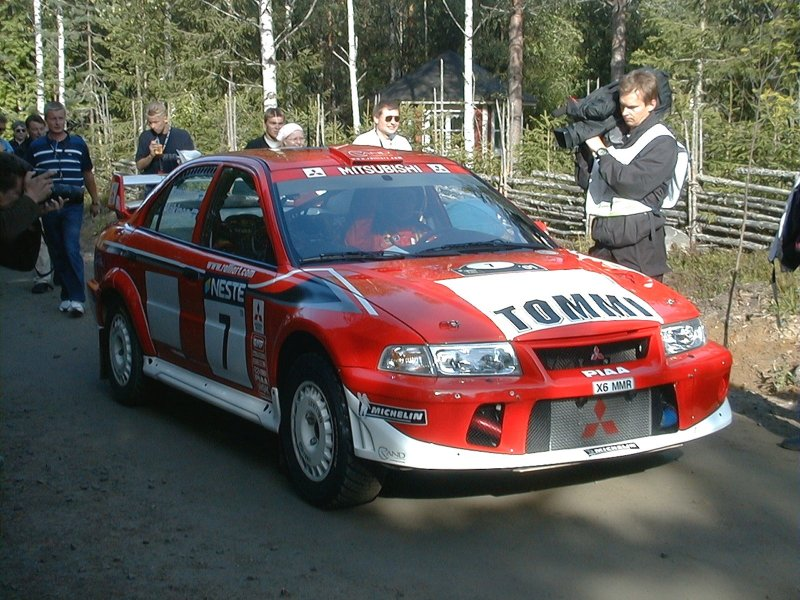
Tommi Mäkinen with a Mitsubishi Lancer Evo at the 2001 Rally Finland

After years of rumours of the rally moving from Jyväskylä to Southern Finland for better accommodations, Tampere announced its intention to host the event after 1999. Jyväskylä retained the event but the headquarters were relocated to the large newly built Paviljonki congress and trade fair centre. Previously, Laajavuori had served as the competition centre for 30 years. The Hippos super special was dropped in favour of a similar stage at the Killeri harness racing track by the lake Killerjärvi, where the audience had better visibility of the competing cars. The 50th running of the Rally Finland in 2000 was won by Peugeot's Marcus Grönholm, who would go on to dominate the event. In 2002, Englishman Richard Burns challenged teammate Grönholm to become the third non-Nordic competitor to win the rally, but broke his car on a jump in Ouninpohja while leading the event. The next foreign winner was Ford's Estonian driver Markko Märtin in the following year. For the first time in the history of the event, no Finnish driver made it onto the podium.

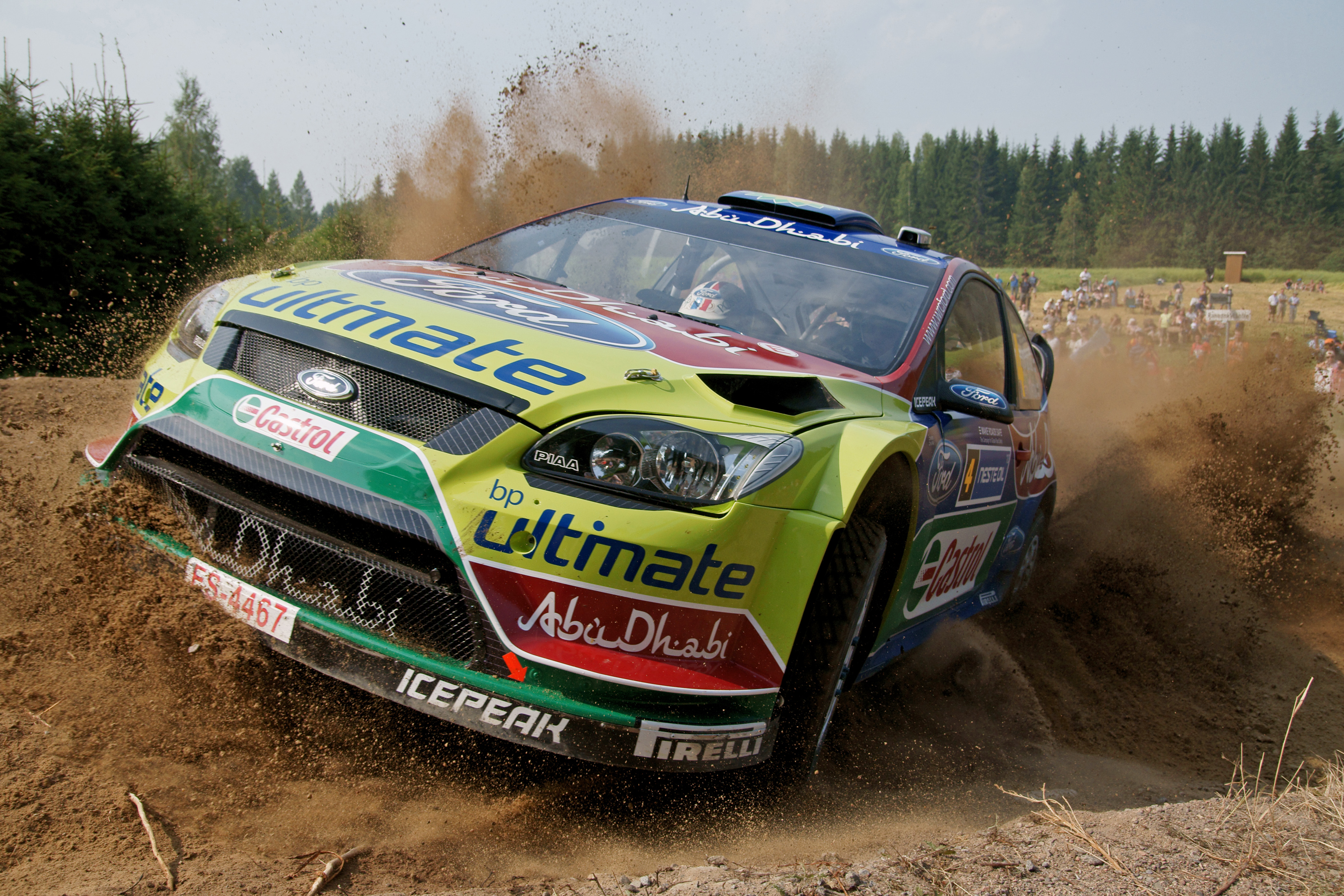
Jari-Matti Latvala during 2010 shakedown

Rally Finland was chosen the "Rally of the Year" for the third year in a row in 2004. Despite Lahti entering the race, a unanimous decision was made to keep Jyväskylä as the rally headquarters. In 2005, Grönholm set the still-standing record for the highest average speed in a world rally; 122.86 kilometres per hour (76.34 mph). In the 2007 Rally Finland, Grönholm equalled Mikkola's win record and became the first driver to win the same WRC event seven times. At the 2008 rally, Sébastien Loeb added his name to the list of non-Nordic winners. This also marked Citroën's first win since 1962.

As the World Rally Championship reintroduced round rotation in 2009, Rally Finland signed a five-year contract with WRC promoter International Sportsworld Communicators (ISC), ensuring that the event remained on the calendar annually.

==== 2010s ====
The 2010 event saw a major change; the rally was run in two days instead of three and finished on Saturday. Ford's Finns Mikko Hirvonen and Jari-Matti Latvala took their debut home wins in 2009 and 2010, respectively. At the 2011 Rally Finland, Loeb made history by becoming the first non-Finn to win the event twice. The event expanded to Lahti in the south and brought classic rally cars to the route, as some of the stages were also part of the Lahti Historic Rally.

==== 2020s ====
The 2020 rally Finland was cancelled because of the COVID-19 pandemic. The event returned in 2021 for its 70th running, held from 1 to 3 October after being moved from its usual summer date to improve the chances of spectator attendance.

== Characteristics ==
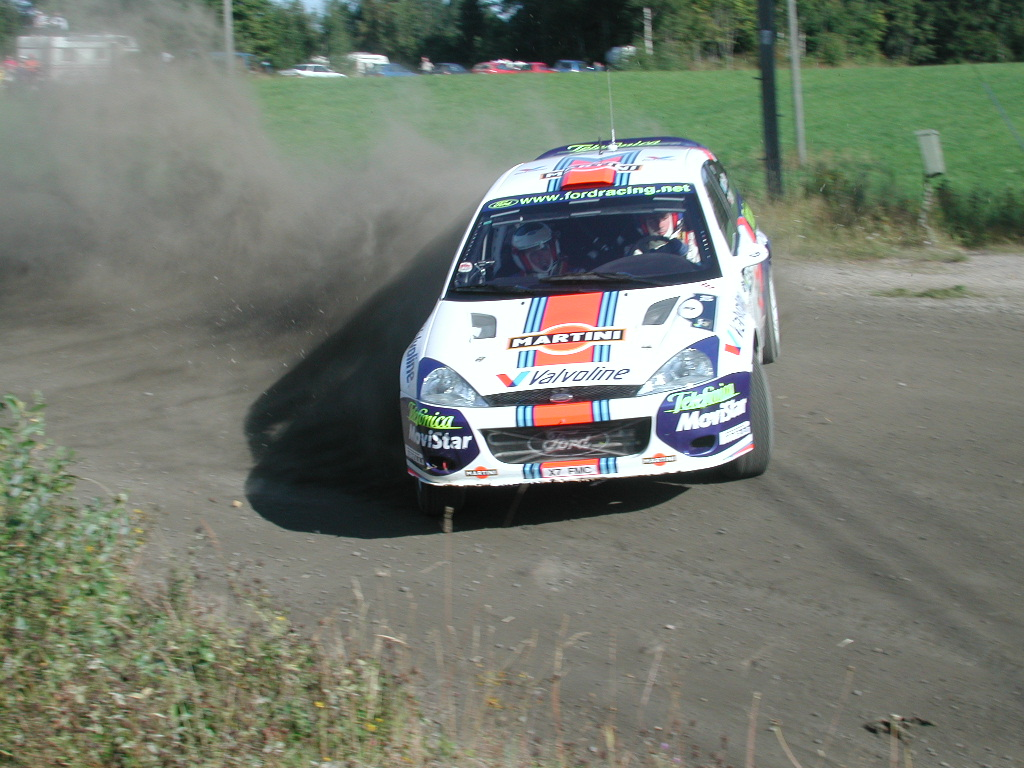
Colin McRae in a Focus RS WRC in 2001

=== Geographic features ===
Rally Finland is known for its smooth and wide gravel roads, numerous big jumps (or yumps) and blind crests.

It is the highest-speed rally in the World Rally Championship, having averaged 125.4 km/h in 2015. Of the nine fastest-ever WRC rallies by average speed, eight are editions of the Rally Finland. As a result, it has become known as the "Grand Prix of rallying", "Finnish Grand Prix" and "Gravel Grand Prix".

The high number of jumps led to the nickname "The Rally of the Thousand Jumps". Formula One world champion Kimi Räikkönen said that the event "is probably the closest to asphalt driving as you can get on gravel." According to The Sydney Morning Herald, the roads are considered the best in the world championship. As the high-speed corners are often surrounded by trees, carefully crafted pacenotes and correct racing lines are necessary to survive the event; small errors easily lead to big crashes.

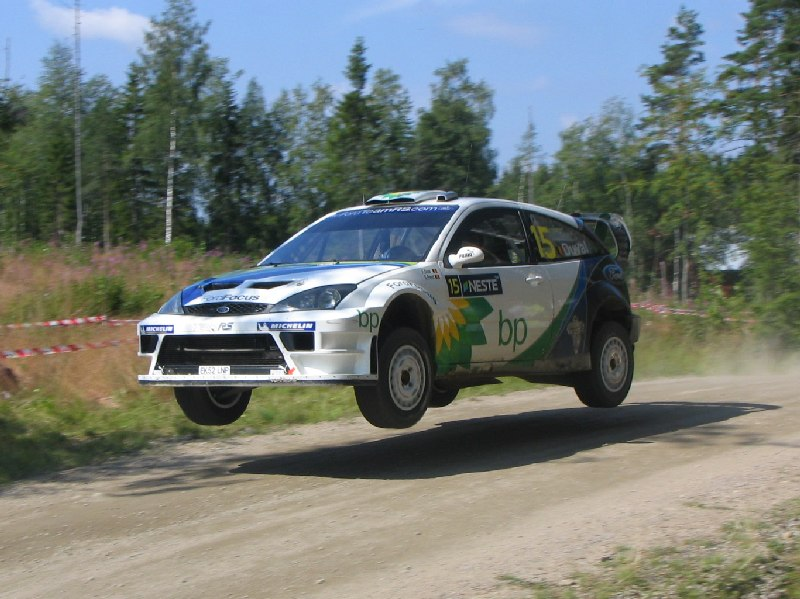
François Duval jumps in 2004

=== Popularity ===
Although Rally Finland has traditionally been a difficult event for non-Nordic competitors, it is popular among drivers as well as fans. The rally attracts hundreds of thousands of spectators each year, and only Monte Carlo Rally and Wales Rally GB have ever attracted more starters. Along with the Wales Rally GB, it is the only event to have featured in all but one WRC season. The WRC teams voted Rally Finland the "Rally of the Year" in 1998, 2002, 2003 and 2004. The official website of the World Rally Championship lists the event as one of the "undoubted highlights" of a season.

=== Ouninpohja stage ===
The most famous competitive section of the rally is Ouninpohja. Well known for its high-speed jumps and sweeping corners, it ranks among the most prestigious special stages in the world. At one jump located 6 kilometres (3.7 mi) from the start line, close to a landmark yellow house, spectators measure the length of the jumps and mark the distance by the roadside. In 2003, Markko Märtin set the record for the longest jump, travelling 57 metres (187 ft) in the air at a speed of 171 kilometres per hour (106 mph).

The Ouninpohja stage was split into two parts for the 2005 and 2006 events, as Petter Solberg had exceeded the FIA's maximum average speed (130 km/h) in 2004. The rule was changed for 2007 and Ouninpohja returned as a 33 km (21 mi) version, although the organisers added three chicanes. However, the stage was left out of the route in 2008. Jarmo Mahonen, managing director of AKK Sports, stated that "the matter was discussed with the FIA already last year, and at the time we were able to keep Ouninpohja as a part of our route. This year we have to leave it out for safety reasons." In 2012, the Ouninpohja stage returned and also served as the power stage. The stage ranges from 97 m to a maximum of 180 m in elevation.

== Winners ==
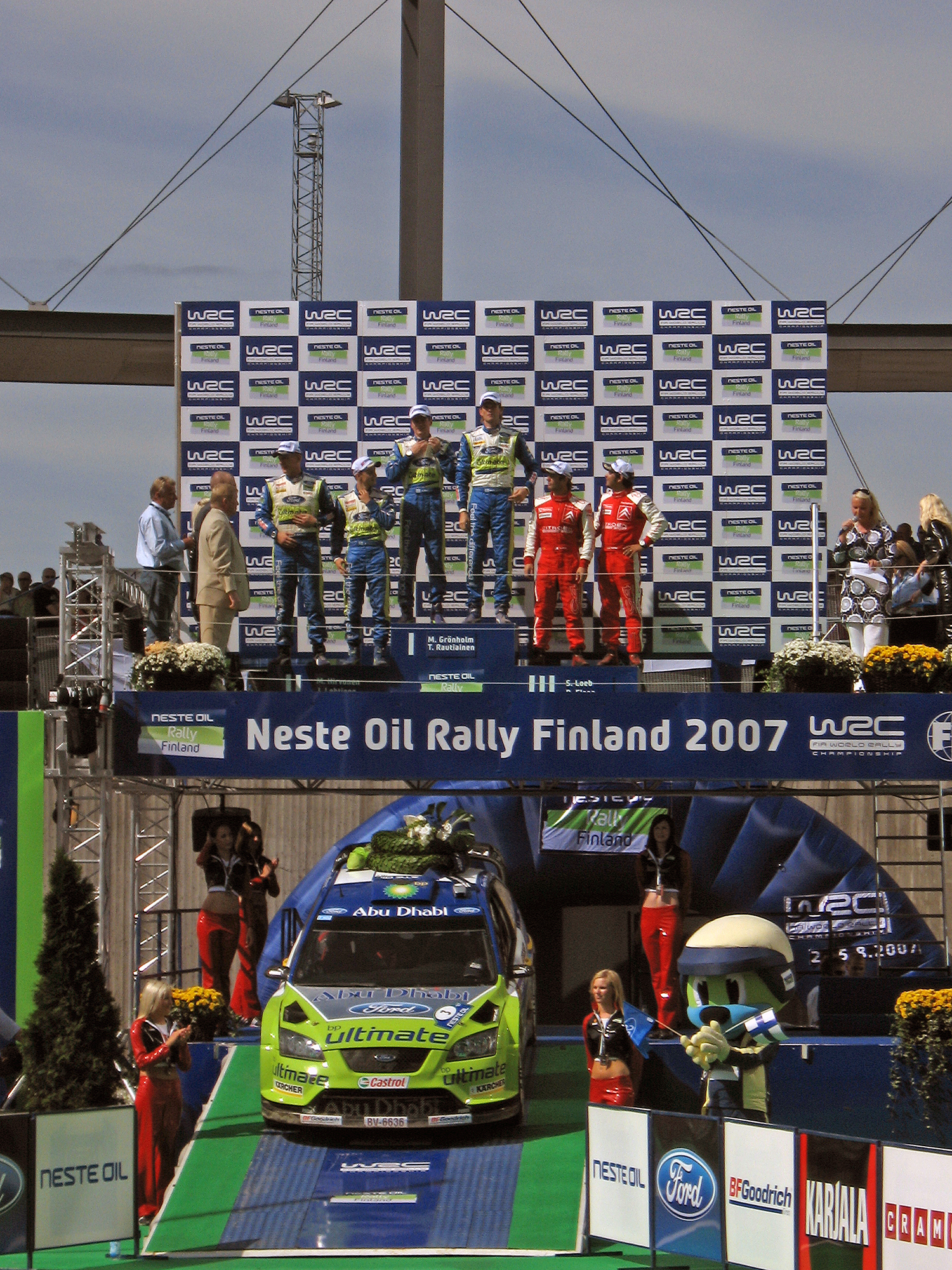
Marcus Grönholm celebrates his last Rally Finland victory in 2007

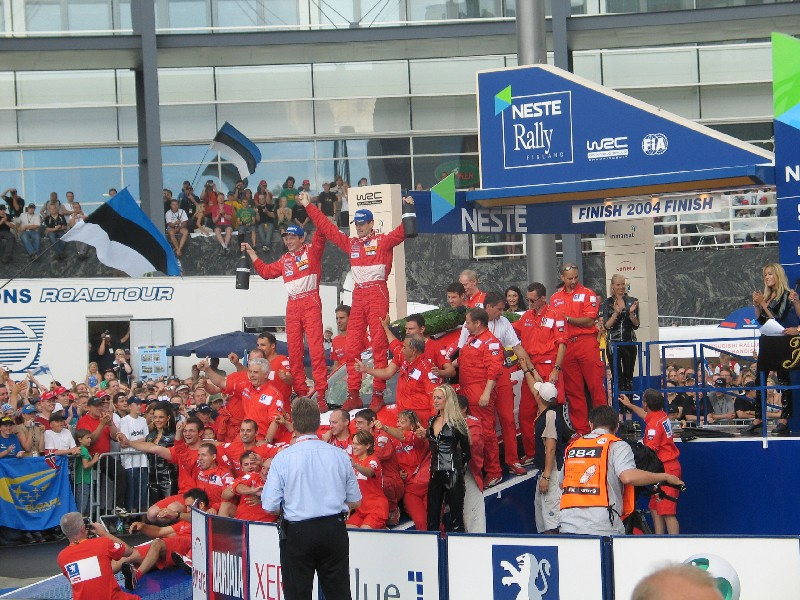
Marcus Grönholm and Peugeot Sport celebrate 2004 win

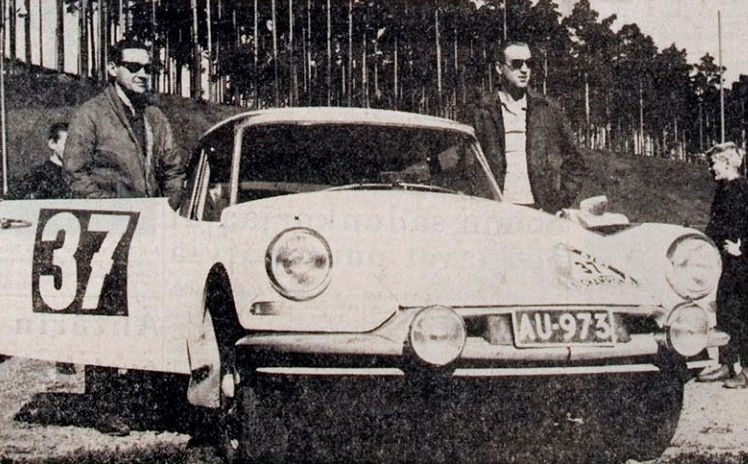
Pauli Toivonen, winner with his Citroën DS 19 in 1962

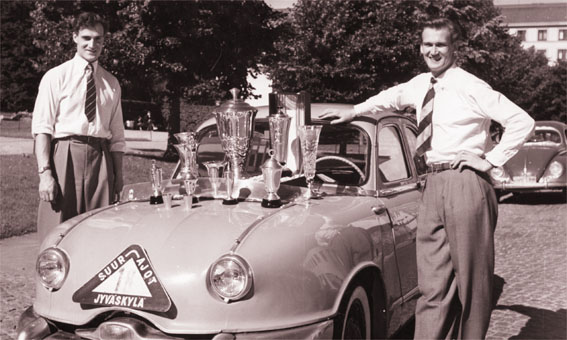
Kalpala brothers with their 1954 trophies

Season	Driver	Co-driver	Vehicle	Event report
1951	(Finland) Arvo Karlsson	(Finland) Vilho Mattila	(United Kingdom) Austin Atlantic	
1952	(Finland) Eino Elo	(Finland) Kai Nuortila	(France) Peugeot 203	
1953	(Finland) Vilho Hietanen	(Finland) Olof Hixén	(United Kingdom) Allard	
1954	(Finland) Osmo Kalpala	(Finland) Eino Kalpala	(France) Panhard Dyna Z	
1955	(Finland) Eino Elo	(Finland) Kai Nuortila	(France) Peugeot 403	
1956	(Finland) Osmo Kalpala	(Finland) Eino Kalpala	(Germany) DKW F93	
1957	(Sweden) Erik Carlsson	(Sweden) Mario Pavoni	(Sweden) Saab 93	
1958	(Finland) Osmo Kalpala	(Finland) Eino Kalpala	(Italy) Alfa Romeo Giulietta TI	
1959	(Sweden) Gunnar Callbo	(Finland) Väinö Nurmimaa	(Sweden) Volvo PV 544	
1960	(Finland) Carl-Otto Bremer	(Finland) Juhani Lampi	(Sweden) Saab 96	
1961	(Finland) Rauno Aaltonen	(Finland) Väinö Nurmimaa	(Germany) Mercedes-Benz 220 SE	
1962	(Finland) Pauli Toivonen	(Finland) Jaakko Kallio	(France) Citroën DS19	
1963	(Finland) Simo Lampinen	(Finland) Jyrki Ahava	(Sweden) Saab 96 Sport	
1964	(Finland) Simo Lampinen	(Finland) Jyrki Ahava	(Sweden) Saab 96 Sport	
1965	(Finland) Timo Mäkinen	(Finland) Pekka Keskitalo	(United Kingdom) Mini Cooper S	
1966	(Finland) Timo Mäkinen	(Finland) Pekka Keskitalo	(United Kingdom) Mini Cooper S	
1967	(Finland) Timo Mäkinen	(Finland) Pekka Keskitalo	(United Kingdom) Mini Cooper S	
1968	(Finland) Hannu Mikkola	(Finland) Anssi Järvi	(United Kingdom) Ford Escort TC	
1969	(Finland) Hannu Mikkola	(Finland) Anssi Järvi	(United Kingdom) Ford Escort TC	
1970	(Finland) Hannu Mikkola	(Sweden) Gunnar Palm	(United Kingdom) Ford Escort TC	
1971	(Sweden) Stig Blomqvist	(Sweden) Arne Hertz	(Sweden) Saab 96 V4	
1972	(Finland) Simo Lampinen	(Finland) Klaus Sohlberg	(Sweden) Saab 96 V4	
1973	(Finland) Timo Mäkinen	(United Kingdom) Henry Liddon	(United Kingdom) Ford Escort RS1600	Report
1974	(Finland) Hannu Mikkola	(United Kingdom) John Davenport	(United Kingdom) Ford Escort RS1600	Report
1975	(Finland) Hannu Mikkola	(Finland) Atso Aho	(Japan) Toyota Corolla	Report
1976	(Finland) Markku Alén	(Finland) Ilkka Kivimäki	(Italy) Fiat 131 Abarth	Report
1977	(Finland) Kyösti Hämäläinen	(Finland) Martti Tiukkanen	(United Kingdom) Ford Escort RS1800	Report
1978	(Finland) Markku Alén	(Finland) Ilkka Kivimäki	(Italy) Fiat 131 Abarth	Report
1979	(Finland) Markku Alén	(Finland) Ilkka Kivimäki	(Italy) Fiat 131 Abarth	Report
1980	(Finland) Markku Alén	(Finland) Ilkka Kivimäki	(Italy) Fiat 131 Abarth	Report
1981	(Finland) Ari Vatanen	(United Kingdom) David Richards	(United Kingdom) Ford Escort RS1800	Report
1982	(Finland) Hannu Mikkola	(Sweden) Arne Hertz	(Germany) Audi Quattro	Report
1983	(Finland) Hannu Mikkola	(Sweden) Arne Hertz	(Germany) Audi Quattro A2	Report
1984	(Finland) Ari Vatanen	(United Kingdom) Terry Harryman	(France) Peugeot 205 Turbo 16	Report
1985	(Finland) Timo Salonen	(Finland) Seppo Harjanne	(France) Peugeot 205 Turbo 16 E2	Report
1986	(Finland) Timo Salonen	(Finland) Seppo Harjanne	(France) Peugeot 205 Turbo 16 E2	Report
1987	(Finland) Markku Alén	(Finland) Ilkka Kivimäki	(Italy) Lancia Delta HF 4WD	Report
1988	(Finland) Markku Alén	(Finland) Ilkka Kivimäki	(Italy) Lancia Delta Integrale	Report
1989	(Sweden) Mikael Ericsson	(Sweden) Claes Billstam	(Japan) Mitsubishi Galant VR-4	Report
1990	(Spain) Carlos Sainz	(Spain) Luis Moya	(Japan) Toyota Celica GT-Four ST165	Report
1991	(Finland) Juha Kankkunen	(Finland) Juha Piironen	(Italy) Lancia Delta Integrale 16V	Report
1992	(France) Didier Auriol	(France) Bernard Occelli	(Italy) Lancia Delta HF Integrale	Report
1993	(Finland) Juha Kankkunen	(France) Denis Giraudet	(Japan) Toyota Celica Turbo 4WD	Report
1994	(Finland) Tommi Mäkinen	(Finland) Seppo Harjanne	(United Kingdom) Ford Escort RS Cosworth	Report
1995	(Finland) Tommi Mäkinen	(Finland) Seppo Harjanne	(Japan) Mitsubishi Lancer Evolution III	Report^{[A]}
1996	(Finland) Tommi Mäkinen	(Finland) Seppo Harjanne	(Japan) Mitsubishi Lancer Evolution III	Report
1997	(Finland) Tommi Mäkinen	(Finland) Seppo Harjanne	(Japan) Mitsubishi Lancer Evolution IV	Report
1998	(Finland) Tommi Mäkinen	(Finland) Risto Mannisenmäki	(Japan) Mitsubishi Lancer Evolution V	Report
1999	(Finland) Juha Kankkunen	(Finland) Juha Repo	(Japan) Subaru Impreza WRC 99	Report
2000	(Finland) Marcus Grönholm	(Finland) Timo Rautiainen	(France) Peugeot 206 WRC	Report
2001	(Finland) Marcus Grönholm	(Finland) Timo Rautiainen	(France) Peugeot 206 WRC	Report
2002	(Finland) Marcus Grönholm	(Finland) Timo Rautiainen	(France) Peugeot 206 WRC	Report
2003	(Estonia) Markko Märtin	(United Kingdom) Michael Park	(United Kingdom) Ford Focus RS WRC 03	Report
2004	(Finland) Marcus Grönholm	(Finland) Timo Rautiainen	(France) Peugeot 307 WRC	Report
2005	(Finland) Marcus Grönholm	(Finland) Timo Rautiainen	(France) Peugeot 307 WRC	Report
2006	(Finland) Marcus Grönholm	(Finland) Timo Rautiainen	(United Kingdom) Ford Focus RS WRC 06	Report
2007	(Finland) Marcus Grönholm	(Finland) Timo Rautiainen	(United Kingdom) Ford Focus RS WRC 07	Report
2008	(France) Sébastien Loeb	(Monaco) Daniel Elena	(France) Citroën C4 WRC	Report
2009	(Finland) Mikko Hirvonen	(Finland) Jarmo Lehtinen	(United Kingdom) Ford Focus RS WRC 09	Report
2010	(Finland) Jari-Matti Latvala	(Finland) Miikka Anttila	(United Kingdom) Ford Focus RS WRC 09	Report
2011	(France) Sébastien Loeb	(Monaco) Daniel Elena	(France) Citroën DS3 WRC	Report
2012	(France) Sébastien Loeb	(Monaco) Daniel Elena	(France) Citroën DS3 WRC	Report
2013	(France) Sébastien Ogier	(France) Julien Ingrassia	(Germany) Volkswagen Polo R WRC	Report
2014	(Finland) Jari-Matti Latvala	(Finland) Miikka Anttila	(Germany) Volkswagen Polo R WRC	Report
2015	(Finland) Jari-Matti Latvala	(Finland) Miikka Anttila	(Germany) Volkswagen Polo R WRC	Report
2016	(United Kingdom) Kris Meeke	(Republic of Ireland) Paul Nagle	(France) Citroën DS3 WRC	Report
2017	(Finland) Esapekka Lappi	(Finland) Janne Ferm	(Japan) Toyota Yaris WRC	Report
2018	(Estonia) Ott Tänak	(Estonia) Martin Järveoja	(Japan) Toyota Yaris WRC	Report
2019	(Estonia) Ott Tänak	(Estonia) Martin Järveoja	(Japan) Toyota Yaris WRC	Report
2020	Cancelled due to COVID-19 concerns			
2021	(United Kingdom) Elfyn Evans	(United Kingdom) Scott Martin	(Japan) Toyota Yaris WRC	Report
2022	(Estonia) Ott Tänak	(Estonia) Martin Järveoja	(South Korea) Hyundai i20 N Rally1	Report
2023	(United Kingdom) Elfyn Evans	(United Kingdom) Scott Martin	(Japan) Toyota GR Yaris Rally1	Report
2024	(France) Sébastien Ogier	(France) Vincent Landais	(Japan) Toyota GR Yaris Rally1	Report
2025	(Finland) Kalle Rovanperä	(Finland) Jonne Halttunen	(Japan) Toyota GR Yaris Rally1	Report
2026	(Finland) Sami Pajari	(Finland) Marko Salminen	(Japan) Toyota GR Yaris Rally1	Report

=== Multiple winners ===
Wins	Driver	Years won
7	(Finland) Hannu Mikkola	1968–1970, 1974–1975, 1982–1983
7	(Finland) Marcus Grönholm	2000–2002, 2004–2007
6	(Finland) Markku Alén	1976, 1978–1980, 1987–1988
5	(Finland) Tommi Mäkinen	1994–1998
4	(Finland) Timo Mäkinen	1965–1967, 1973
3	(Finland) Osmo Kalpala	1954, 1956, 1958
3	(Finland) Simo Lampinen	1963–1964, 1972
3	(Finland) Juha Kankkunen	1991, 1993, 1999
3	(France) Sébastien Loeb	2008, 2011–2012
3	(Finland) Jari-Matti Latvala	2010, 2014–2015
3	(Estonia) Ott Tänak	2018–2019, 2022
2	(Finland) Eino Elo	1952, 1955
2	(Finland) Ari Vatanen	1981, 1984
2	(Finland) Timo Salonen	1985–1986
2	(France) Sébastien Ogier	2013, 2024
2	(United Kingdom) Elfyn Evans	2021, 2023

Wins	Manufacturers
13	(United Kingdom) Ford
11	(Japan) Toyota
10	(France) Peugeot
6	(Sweden) Saab
5	(France) Citroën
5	(Japan) Mitsubishi
4	(Italy) Fiat
4	(Italy) Lancia
3	(United Kingdom) BMC
3	(Germany) Volkswagen
2	(Germany) Audi

=== Notes ===
^{A} Due to the World Rally Championship round rotation, the 1995 rally counted only for the 2-litre World Cup.
