= Ulf Grönholm =

Finnish rally driver (1943–1981)

Personal information
- Nationality: (Finland) Finnish
- Full name: Ulf Gunnar Johannes Grönholm
- Born: 8 January 1943; Helsinki, Finland
- Died: 26 February 1981 (aged 38); Kirkkonummi, Finland

World Rally Championship record
- Years active: 1973–1979
- Co-driver: (Finland) Henry Laine (Finland) Juhani Toivonen (Finland) Alf Krogell (Finland) Bob Rehnström
- Teams: Opel, Datsun, Fiat
- Rallies: 4
- Championships: 0
- Rally wins: 0
- Podiums: 0
- Stage wins: 0
- Total points: 10

Ulf Gunnar Johannes Grönholm (8 January 1943 – 26 February 1981) was a two-time national champion rally driver, from Finland. He was born in Helsinki. Grönholm was killed during an illegal practice run for Hankiralli in the middle of the night on 26 February 1981 in Kirkkonummi. He was the father of eventual 2000 and 2002 World Rally Champion, Marcus Grönholm.
