= August Hämäläinen =

Finnish farmer and politician (1874–1956)

August Hämäläinen (17 July 1874 – 29 January 1956) was a Finnish farmer and politician, born in Kuopio. He was a member of the Parliament of Finland from 1919 to 1922, representing the National Progressive Party.
