= Alex Hämäläinen =

Finnish politician

Aleksander (Alex) Hämäläinen (20 July 1894, Mikkelin maalaiskunta - 28 August 1943) was a Finnish farmworker, logger, party functionary and politician. He was a member of the Parliament of Finland from 1930 until his death in 1943, representing the Social Democratic Party of Finland (SDP).
