= Kyösti Hämäläinen =

Finnish rally driver (born 1945)

Personal information
- Nationality: (Finland) Finnish
- Born: 16 September 1945 (age 81); Helsinki, Finland

World Rally Championship record
- Years active: 1973–1982, 1985–1988
- Co-driver: (Finland) Veijo Aho (Finland) Urpo Vihervaara (Finland) Juhani Korhonen (Finland) Martti Tiukkanen (United Kingdom) Scott Howard (Finland) Matti Lammi (Belgium) Lionel Hennebel (Finland) Tapio Vanhala (Finland) Esa Virrankilpi (Finland) Martti Putkonen (Finland) Ossi Nurminen
- Teams: Ford
- Rallies: 19
- Championships: 0
- Rally wins: 1
- Podiums: 1
- Total points: 0
- First rally: 1973 1000 Lakes Rally
- Last rally: 1988 1000 Lakes Rally

Kyösti Hämäläinen (born 16 September 1945 in Helsinki) is a Finnish rally driver. He contested 19 World Rally Championship events, winning the 1977 1000 Lakes Rally overall. Hämäläinen also won 13 Finnish Rally Championship titles between 1973 and 1986.

== Career ==
Hämäläinen began his career in 1965 by taking part in ice racing events with rental cars. In 1969, he moved to rallying and in 1973 took his Finnish Rally Championship championship in group 1, driving an Alfa Romeo 2000 GTV. He followed it up with four consecutive Group 1 titles between 1975 and 1978, using a Sunbeam Avenger (1975) and Ford Escort (1976, 1977, 1978). In 1978 Hämäläinen moved to Group 2 and won eight consecutive Finnish Championships with a Ford Escort, from 1979 to 1986.

Hämäläinen's career in the World Rally Championship consisted mainly of his entries into 1000 Lakes Rally, which was also part of the Finnish Rally Championship. His first WRC start was the 1973 1000 Lakes Rally, in which he retired. 1977 was the most successful year of Hämäläinen's WRC career, including an unexpected victory in the 1000 Lakes Rally, a 5th-place finish in International Swedish Rally and a 6th place in Lombard RAC Rally.

== Complete WRC results ==
Year	Entrant	Car	1	2	3	4	5	6	7	8	9	10	11	12	13	WDC	Points
1973	Kyösti Hämäläinen	Alfa Romeo 2000 GTV	MON	SWE	POR	KEN	MOR	GRE	POL	FIN; Ret	AUT	ITA	USA	GBR	FRA	N/A	N/A
1974	Kyösti Hämäläinen	Alfa Romeo 2000 GTV	POR	KEN	FIN; 17	ITA	CAN	USA	GBR	FRA						N/A	N/A
1975	Kyösti Hämäläinen	Sunbeam Avenger	MON	SWE	KEN	GRE	MOR	POR	FIN; 9	ITA	FRA	GBR				N/A	N/A
1976	Ford Motor Co Ltd	Ford Escort RS 2000 MKII	MON	SWE	POR	KEN	GRE	MOR	FIN; Ret	ITA	FRA					N/A	N/A
1976	Kyösti Hämäläinen	Ford Escort RS 2000 MKII										GBR; Ret				N/A	N/A
1977	Kyösti Hämäläinen	Ford Escort RS 2000 MKII	MON	SWE; 5	POR	KEN	NZL	GRE								N/A	N/A
1977	Ford Motor Co Ltd	Ford Escort RS 1800 MKII							FIN; 1	CAN	ITA	FRA				N/A	N/A
1977	Kyösti Hämäläinen	Ford Escort RS 1800 MKII											GBR; 6			N/A	N/A
1978	Ford Motor Co Ltd	Ford Escort RS 1800 MKII	MON	SWE	KEN	POR	GRE	FIN; 8	CAN	ITA	CIV	FRA	GBR			-	0
1979	Kyösti Hämäläinen	Mercedes-Benz 300 D	MON	SWE	POR	KEN	GRE	NZL	FIN; 31	CAN	ITA	FRA	GBR	CIV		-	0
1980	Kyösti Hämäläinen	Lada VAZ 21011	MON	SWE	POR	KEN	GRE	ARG	FIN; 18	NZL	ITA	FRA	GBR	CIV		-	0
1981	VMJ Racing	Ford Escort RS	MON	SWE; Ret	POR	KEN	FRA	GRE	ARG	BRA						-	0
1981	Team Ralliart	Mitsubishi Lancer 2000 Turbo									FIN; 11	ITA	CIV	GBR		-	0
1982	Kyösti Hämäläinen	Ford Escort RS	MON	SWE	POR	KEN	FRA	GRE	NZL	BRA	FIN; Ret	ITA	CIV	GBR		-	0
1985	Ford Finland	Ford Escort RS Turbo	MON	SWE	POR	KEN	FRA	GRC	NZL	ARG	FIN; 28	ITA	CIV	GBR		-	0
1986	Kyösti Hämäläinen	Ford Sierra XR	MON	SWE	POR	KEN	FRA	GRC	NZL	ARG	FIN; Ret	CIV	ITA	GBR	USA	-	0
1987	Kyösti Hämäläinen	Ford Sierra RS Cosworth	MON	SWE	POR	KEN	FRA	GRC	USA	NZL	ARG	FIN; Ret	CIV	ITA	GBR	-	0
1988	Kyösti Hämäläinen	Ford Sierra RS Cosworth	MON	SWE	POR	KEN	FRA	GRC	USA	NZL	ARG	FIN; 15	CIV	ITA	GBR	-	0
