= Aatu Hämäläinen =

Finnish ice hockey player

- Born: 28 February 1987 (age 38); Suonenjoki, Finland
- Height: 5 ft 10 in (178 cm)
- Weight: 178 lb (81 kg; 12 st 10 lb)
- Position: Forward
- Shoots: Right
- Mestis team Former teams: IPK; KalPa; TPS; HPK
- Playing career: 2006–present

Aatu Hämäläinen (born 28 February 1987) is a Finnish professional ice hockey player playing for Iisalmen Peli-Karhut in Mestis, the second-tier league in Finland.

He previously played in the SM-liiga for KalPa, TPS and HPK. His younger brother Aleksi Hämäläinen also plays professionally and they are currently teammates at IPK.
