= Aleksi Hämäläinen =

Finnish ice hockey player

- Born: 30 November 1995 (age 29); Suonenjoki, Finland
- Height: 6 ft 0 in (183 cm)
- Weight: 159 lb (72 kg; 11 st 5 lb)
- Position: Forward
- Shoots: Left
- Ligue Magnus team Former teams: Gothiques d'Amiens; KalPa; IPK; STS Sanok; EK Zell am See
- Playing career: 2015–present

Aleksi Hämäläinen (born 30 November 1995) is a Finnish professional ice hockey forward currently playing for Gothiques d'Amiens in Ligue Magnus. He is the younger brother of Aatu Hämäläinen.

Hämäläinen made his Liiga debut for KalPa during the 2015–16 season.
