= Rallye Deutschland =

Car rally event

- Status: active
- Genre: motorsporting event
- Frequency: annual
- Country: Germany
- Inaugurated: 1982

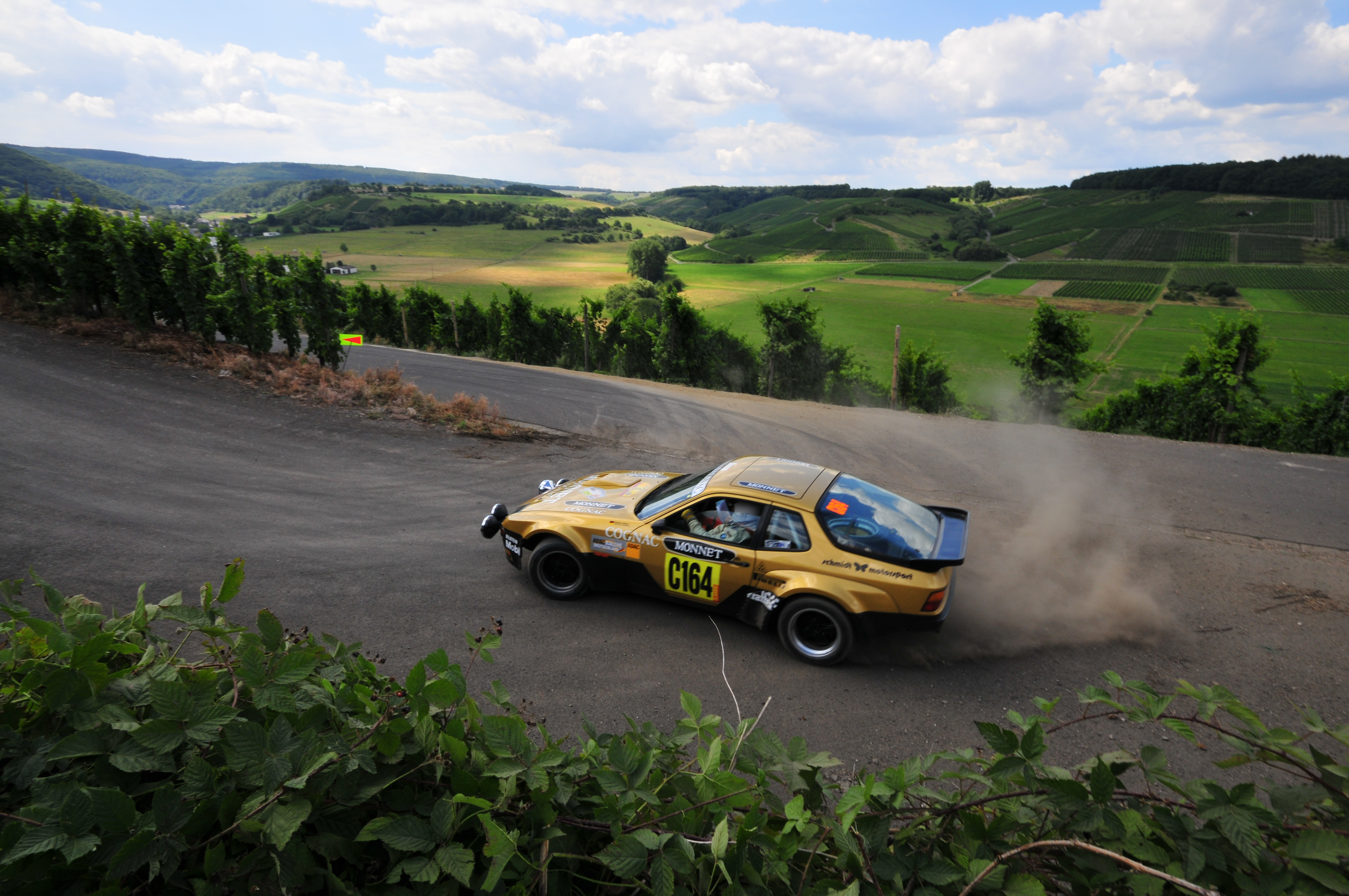
A historic Porsche 924 GTS driven through a stage during the 2008 rally.

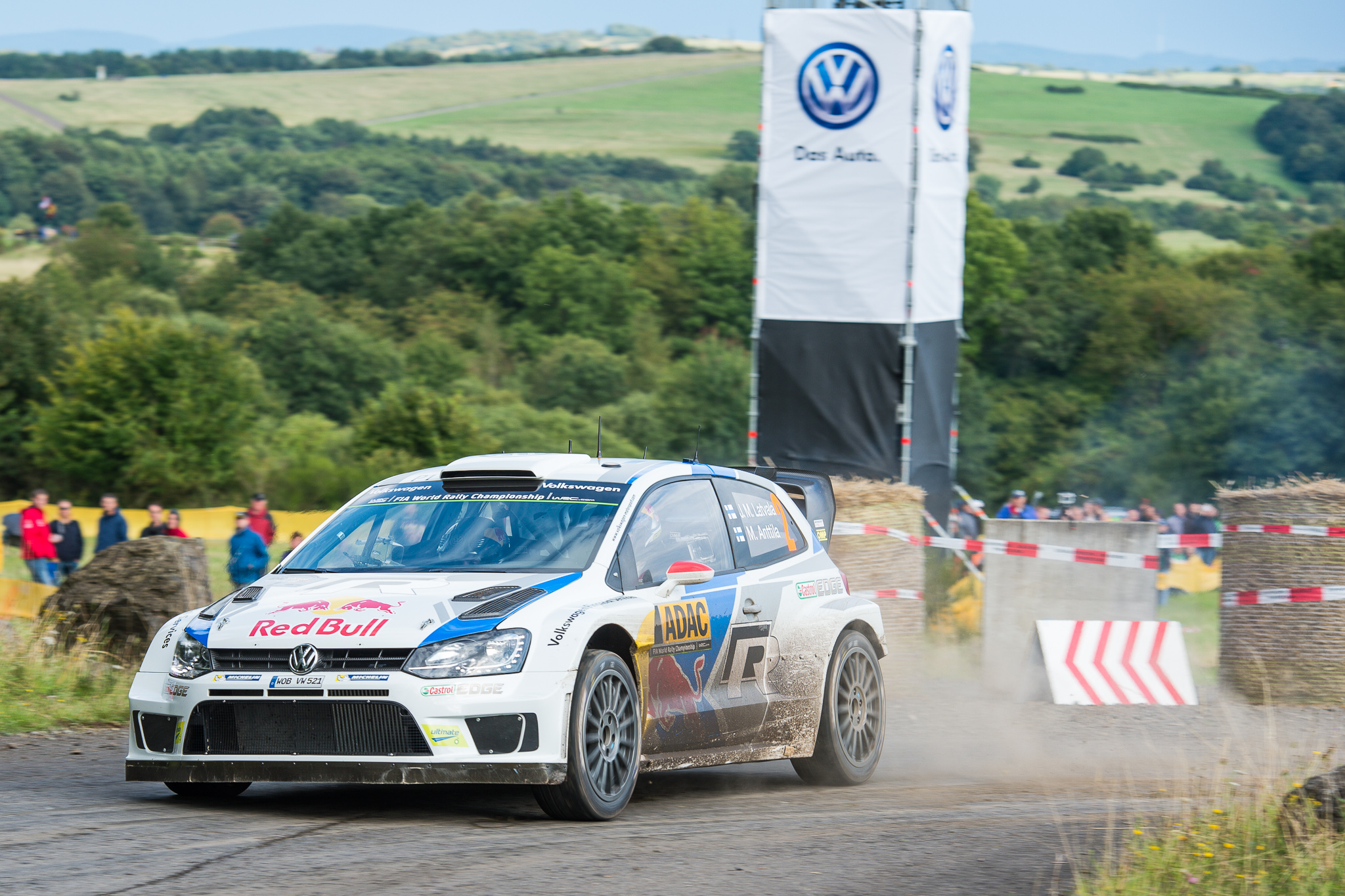
The Polo R WRC, the 2015 and 2016 winner in Germany.

The ADAC Rallye Deutschland is a rally event held in Germany. The event was first held in 1982 and originally hosted by e.g. Frankfurt, Mainz and Koblenz. In 2000, the rally was relocated to the region around Trier. Previously part of the European and German championships, the event was in the World Rally Championship calendar from the 2002 season to 2020 season. The 2020 event was cancelled due to the COVID-19 pandemic. Whilst Rallye Deutschland has not returned to the calendar since, Germany has since 2023 co-hosted a rally with Austria and the Czech Republic under the title of the Central European Rally.

== History ==
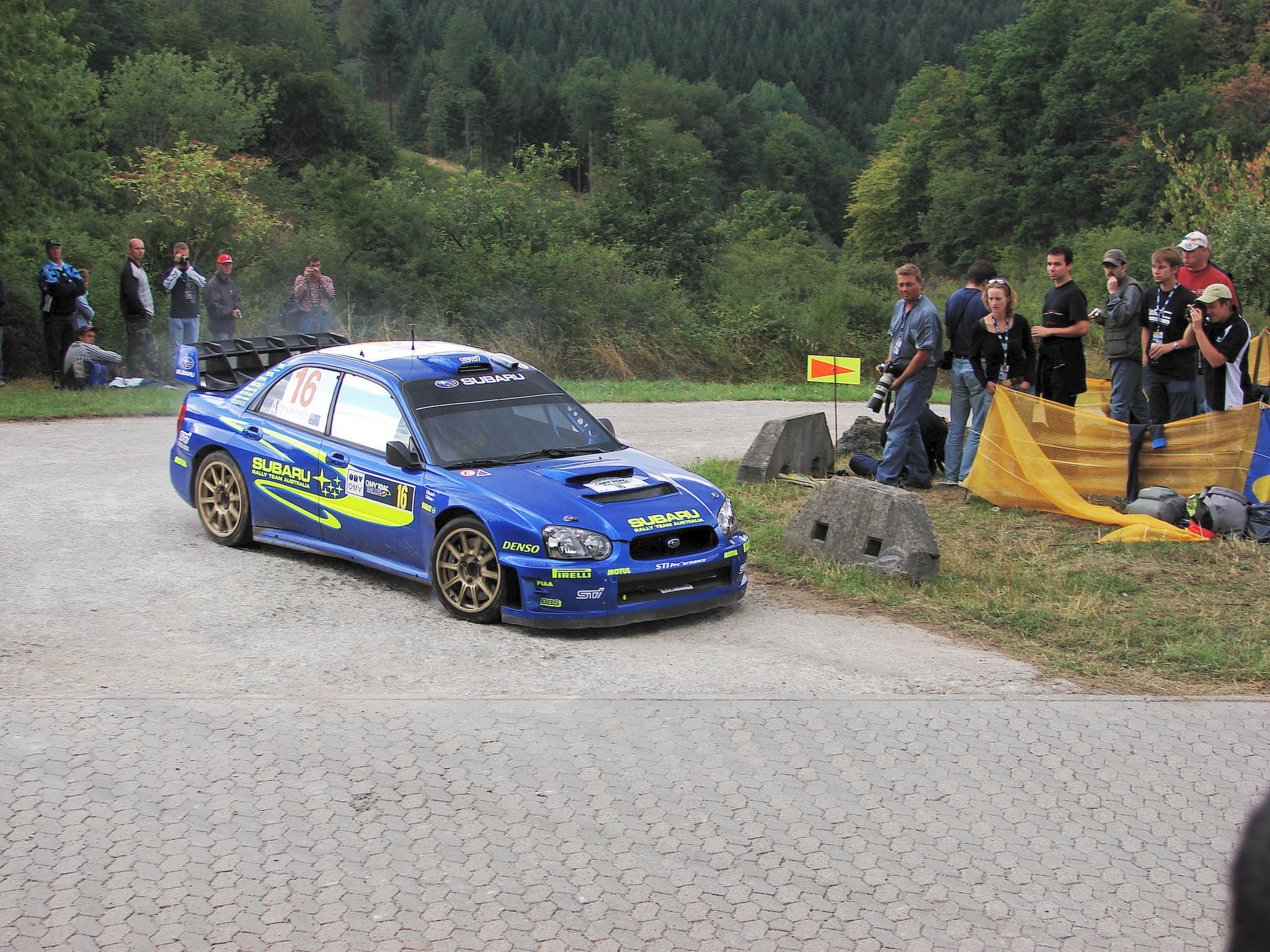
Chris Atkinson at the 2006 event

Previously part of the European Rally Championship and the German Rally Championship, the rally was included in the World Rally Championship calendar for the 2002 season. The organisers opted for a split in locations: media center, rally headquarters and the parc ferme were placed in Trier, the parc ferme being a prominent display of all remaining cars on the Viehmarkt, surrounded by restaurants, pubs and special events such as music and the brewery festival. Start and finish ceremonies were also held in Trier in front of the Porta Nigra with the cars making their way through the spectators. Meanwhile, the service park was located roughly 60 km southeast on the shore of the picturesque Bostalsee.

The rally traditionally started with the shakedown close to the servicepark on Thursday morning, before moving to Trier for the showstart. The next three days were separated according to the three different track characteristics. Friday's leg one was held to the northeast of Trier around the Moselle in the vineyards. For afternoon and evening service the cars returned to Bostalsee before heading to Trier and parc-ferme. Saturdays' stages were held on and around the military training grounds of Baumholder, including the famous special stage "Panzerplatte". The day ended with a spectator special stage in the small town of Sankt Wendel. Leg three was held in the northern Saarland around Sankt Wendel, followed by a second pass through the spectator special stage. In the early afternoon the crews returned to Trier for the Finish ceremony.

The existing layout received criticism from fans, teams and the FIA with many complaining about the long liaison between stages, and the town of Trier, especially its small businesses, looking for more involvement by moving Trier into the center of rally.

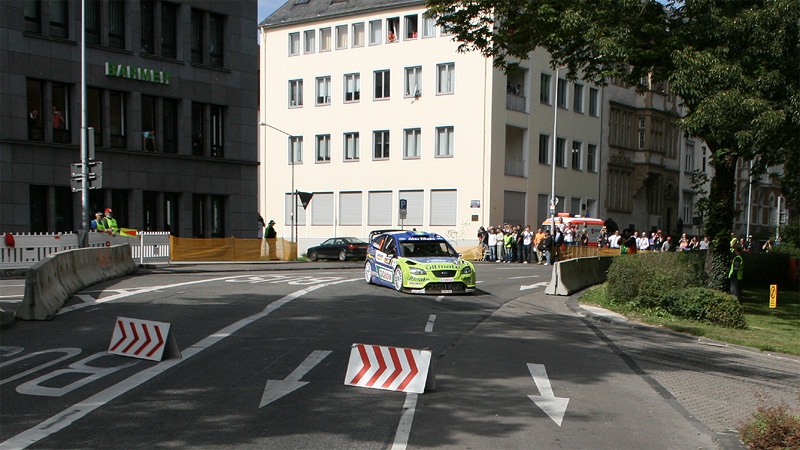
Marcus Grönholm at the "Circus Maximus" SSS of the 2007 rally.

For the 2007 edition, the layout was modified accordingly. The service park along with the media center moved from Bostalsee to Trier's convention center grounds, which offer better infrastructure and are easier to reach. Fans can park in the streets nearby or make use of special shuttle services serving large parking grounds throughout Trier. Both parking and the service park itself are now mostly based on asphalt making them more weather-safe. The shakedown was relocated to the Luxembourgish border and the stages reorganised altogether, putting more focus on the vineyards close to Trier. As before, Friday consists of stages northeast of Trier. However, the second day now combines both the military grounds of Baumholder with a shortened version of Panzerplatte as well as some of the previous Saarland-stages. Sunday again moves the crews back to the vineyards, before the teams return to Trier for the newly created spectator special stage Circus Maximus. Advertised as the highlight of three days of Rally Germany, this stage is a 4.37 km run through downtown Trier around the Porta Nigra. Four cars enter the track separated by 10 to 20 seconds and drive four laps on the roads of Trier. Fans can watch the stage on specially erected grandstands or simply from the curbside. In 2008, the WRC run through stage was broadcast live on television.

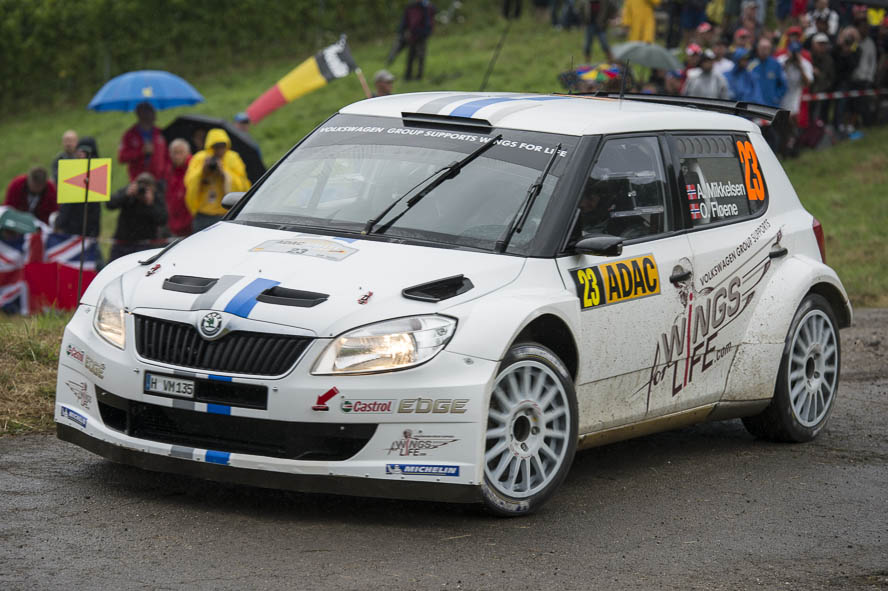
Volkswagen's preparations for their return began in 2012, entering a Škoda Fabia S2000 throughout the season to gain experience running a team.

The revised layout received a lot of praise. 2007 saw 15,000 spectators in Circus Maximus alone, with a total attendance of more than 200,000 for all three days. Due to a cutback in the number of rallies included in each season's calendar and the introduction of alternating rallies, Rallye Deutschland was not part of the 2009 calendar. It returned in the 2010 season, with Sébastien Loeb taking his eighth consecutive win; a WRC record for wins in a single event.

== Characteristics ==
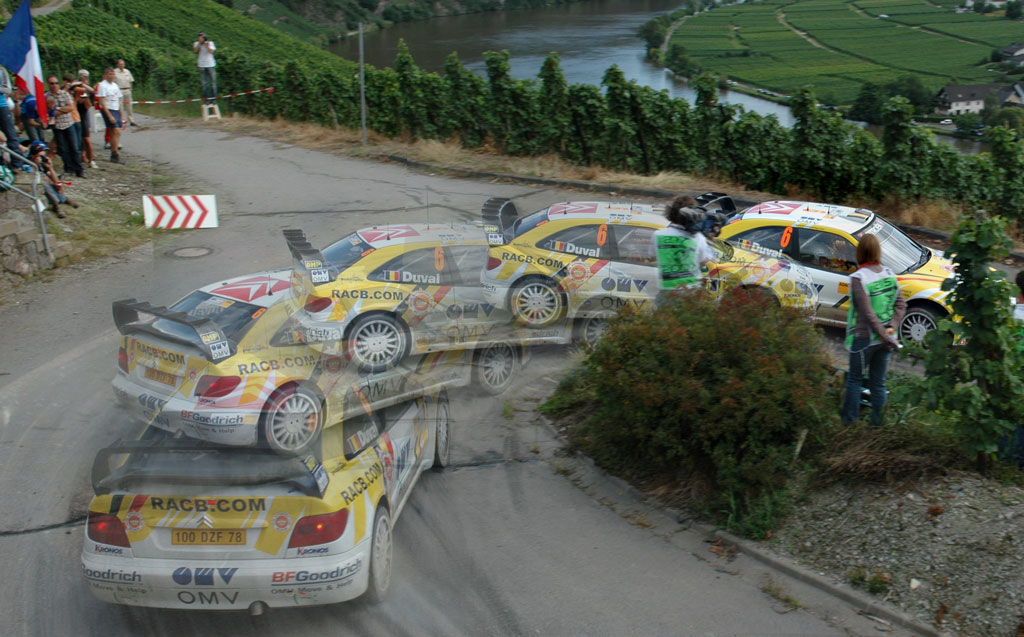
François Duval takes a hairpin turn.

Rally Deutschland is entirely held on asphalt. A significant part of its attraction originates in the mixture of track characteristics encountered throughout the three-day period. This setup has earned it the description of "three rallies in one".

The vineyard stages consist of tight and twisted support roads, with short straights and hairpins in the steep mountains surrounding the Moselle. Fans particularly like the stages because of the close proximity to the cars, sitting on small walls and in between the vines, often less than 2m from the ideal line. However, this layout has also raised serious concerns with the FIA regarding spectator safety. In 2008, the final stage of leg one was cancelled after too many fans where trying to make their way through the vineyards.

The roads on the military training ground, called the panzerplatte or armour flat, near Baumholder are made of rough concrete and surrounded by the dangerous "Hinkelstones" (Calque of "Hinkelstein" meaning Menhir in German) rocks up to a meter in size lining either side the roads as a restraint for military vehicles. The stages are fast and the vast military grounds offer endless spectator points, including the legendary crest known as "Gina". On this terrain small driving-errors almost automatically lead to serious damage to both car and driver, the most prominent victim being Petter Solberg in 2004. Finally, the asphalt roads in the rural northern Saarland are very fast with high-speed curves, only interrupted by some tight turns onto smaller roads.

Besides the different track characteristics, the frequently changing weather makes for additional excitement. Short but strong rainshowers can appear out of nowhere and significantly complicate the tyre-choice. In 2004, Marcus Grönholm became the prominent victim of a rainy morning when he crashed out of the introductory stage on Friday.

== Past winners ==
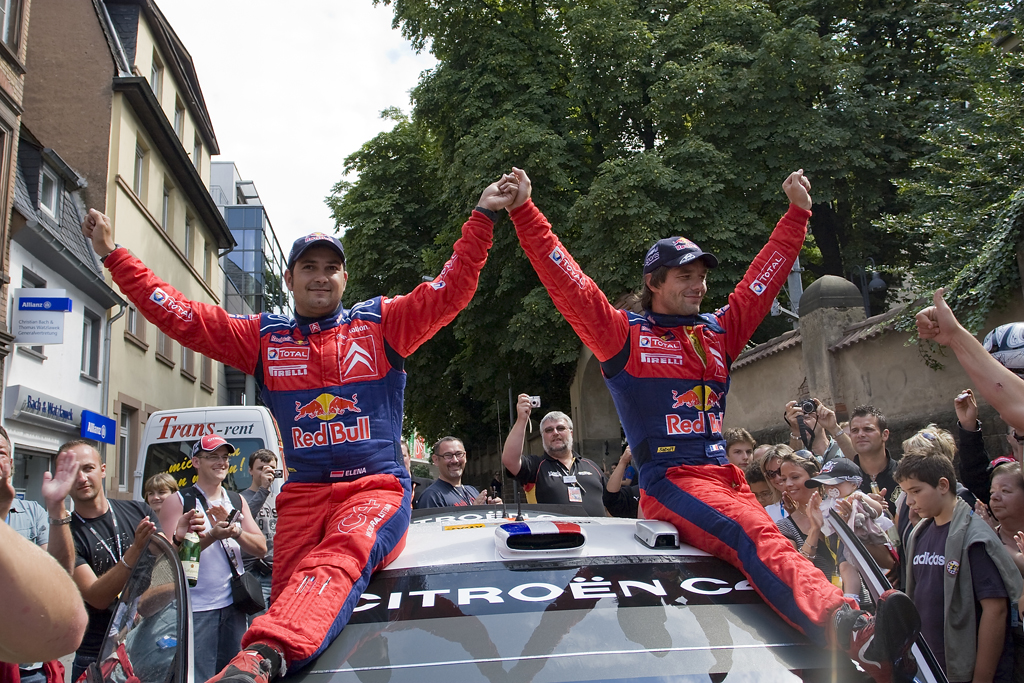
Nine-time winners Sébastien Loeb and Daniel Elena celebrating the 2008 win.

Part of the German Rally Championship
Year	Event	Winner	Vehicle
1982	1. Rallye Deutschland	(West Germany) Erwin Weber	Opel Ascona 400
1983	2. Rallye Deutschland	(West Germany) Walter Röhrl	Lancia 037 Rally
1984	3. Rallye Deutschland	(Finland) Hannu Mikkola	Audi Sport Quattro
1985	4. Rallye Deutschland	(Sweden) Kalle Grundel	Peugeot 205 Turbo 16
1986	5. Rallye Deutschland	(France) Michèle Mouton	Peugeot 205 Turbo 16 E2
1987	6. Rallye Deutschland	(West Germany) Jochi Kleint	VW Golf GTI
1988	7. Rallye Deutschland	(Belgium) Robert Droogmans	Ford Sierra RS Cosworth
1989	8. Rallye Deutschland	(Belgium) Patrick Snijers	Toyota Celica GT-Four ST165
1990	9. Rallye Deutschland	(Belgium) Robert Droogmans	Lancia Delta Integrale
1991	10. Rallye Deutschland	(Italy) Piero Liatti	Lancia Delta Integrale
1992	11. Rallye Deutschland	(Germany) Erwin Weber	Mitsubishi Galant VR-4
1993	12. Rallye Deutschland	(Belgium) Patrick Snijers	Ford Escort RS Cosworth
1994	13. Rallye Deutschland	(Germany) Dieter Depping	Ford Escort RS Cosworth
1995	14. Rallye Deutschland	(Italy) Enrico Bertone	Toyota Celica GT-Four
1996	15. Rallye Deutschland	(Germany) Dieter Depping	Ford Escort RS Cosworth
1997	16. Rallye Deutschland	(Germany) Dieter Depping	Ford Escort RS Cosworth
1998	17. Rallye Deutschland	(Germany) Matthias Kahle	Toyota Corolla WRC
1999	18. Rallye Deutschland	(Germany) Armin Kremer	Subaru Impreza WRC
2000	19. Rallye Deutschland	(Denmark) Henrik Lundgaard	Toyota Corolla WRC
2001	20. Rallye Deutschland	(France) Philippe Bugalski	Citroën Xsara WRC
Part of the World Rally Championship
Year	Event	Winner	Vehicle
2002	21. ADAC Rallye Deutschland	(France) Sébastien Loeb	Citroën Xsara WRC
2003	22. ADAC Rallye Deutschland	(France) Sébastien Loeb	Citroën Xsara WRC
2004	23. OMV ADAC Rallye Deutschland	(France) Sébastien Loeb	Citroën Xsara WRC
2005	24. OMV ADAC Rallye Deutschland	(France) Sébastien Loeb	Citroën Xsara WRC
2006	25. OMV ADAC Rallye Deutschland	(France) Sébastien Loeb	Citroën Xsara WRC
2007	26. ADAC Rallye Deutschland	(France) Sébastien Loeb	Citroën C4 WRC
2008	27. ADAC Rallye Deutschland	(France) Sébastien Loeb	Citroën C4 WRC
2009	Not held		
2010	28. ADAC Rallye Deutschland	(France) Sébastien Loeb	Citroën C4 WRC
2011	29. ADAC Rallye Deutschland	(France) Sébastien Ogier	Citroën DS3 WRC
2012	30. ADAC Rallye Deutschland	(France) Sébastien Loeb	Citroën DS3 WRC
2013	31. ADAC Rallye Deutschland	(Spain) Dani Sordo	Citroën DS3 WRC
2014	32. ADAC Rallye Deutschland	(Belgium) Thierry Neuville	Hyundai i20 WRC
2015	33. ADAC Rallye Deutschland	(France) Sébastien Ogier	Volkswagen Polo R WRC
2016	34. ADAC Rallye Deutschland	(France) Sébastien Ogier	Volkswagen Polo R WRC
2017	35. ADAC Rallye Deutschland	(Estonia) Ott Tänak	Ford Fiesta WRC
2018	36. ADAC Rallye Deutschland	(Estonia) Ott Tänak	Toyota Yaris WRC
2019	37. ADAC Rallye Deutschland	(Estonia) Ott Tänak	Toyota Yaris WRC

† — The 1994 rally only counted for the 2-Litre World Cup.

=== Multiple winners ===
Wins	Driver
9	(France) Sébastien Loeb
3	(France) Sébastien Ogier
3	(Germany) Dieter Depping
3	(Estonia) Ott Tänak
2	(Germany) Erwin Weber
2	(Belgium) Robert Droogmans
2	(Belgium) Patrick Snijers

Wins	Manufacturers
12	(France) Citroën
6	(United States) Ford
6	(Japan) Toyota
3	(Germany) Volkswagen
3	(Italy) Lancia
2	(France) Peugeot
