= Richard Burns =

British rally driver (1971–2005)

- Burns in 2003, with Peugeot Sport

Personal information
- Nationality: (United Kingdom) British
- Full name: Richard Alexander Burns
- Born: 17 January 1971; Reading, Berkshire, England
- Died: 25 November 2005 (aged 34); St John's Wood, London, England

World Rally Championship record
- Years active: 1990–2003
- Co-driver: (United Kingdom) Wayne Goble (United Kingdom) Robert Reid
- Teams: Subaru, Mitsubishi, Peugeot
- Rallies: 104
- Championships: 1 (2001)
- Rally wins: 10
- Podiums: 34
- Stage wins: 277
- Total points: 351
- First rally: 1990 RAC Rally
- First win: 1998 Safari Rally
- Last win: 2001 Rally New Zealand
- Last rally: 2003 Rally Catalunya

Richard Alexander Burns (17 January 1971 – 25 November 2005) was an English rally driver who won the 2001 World Rally Championship, having previously finished runner-up in the series in 1999 and 2000. He also helped Mitsubishi to the world manufacturers' title in 1998, and Peugeot in 2002. His co-driver in his whole career was Robert Reid. He is the only Englishman to have won the World Rally Championship as a driver.

== Career ==
=== Pre-WRC ===
Burns was born in Reading, Berkshire, and grew up in Checkendon, Oxfordshire. At the age of eight, he first started driving his father's old Triumph 2000 in a field near their house. At eleven Burns joined the Under 17 Car Club, where he became driver of the year in 1984. Just two years later, his father arranged a trip to Jan Churchill's Welsh Forest Rally School near Newtown, Powys, where Burns drove a Ford Escort for the day, and from that moment on he knew what he wanted to do. Richard badgered his father into letting him join the Craven Motor Club, in his home town of Reading, where his talent was quickly spotted by David Williams, a rally enthusiast who would play a major role in Burns's early career. In 1988, he entered his first rallies in his own Talbot Sunbeam, but the car was too basic and slow to make much of an impression, so in 1989, he borrowed other competitors' machines to progress. To this end he rallied the stages of Panaround, Bagshot, Mid-Wales, Millbrook, Severn Valley, Kayel Graphics, and the Cambrian Rally as these were all rallies which included stages used on more prestigious events.

In 1990, Burns joined the Peugeot Challenge after David Williams bought Burns a Peugeot 205 GTI. Upon winning that series, Richard's prize was a chance to drive a World Rally Championship event in Great Britain that same year. Then in 1991, Burns met Robert Reid, the man who was to become his co-driver for the rest of his career, finishing 16th overall in their first WRC rally together, winning the A7 car category. For 1992 Williams purchased a Group N Subaru Legacy for Burns; with support from Prodrive, they won the National Championship. This year also saw Burns help Colin McRae with his gravel notes as Prodrive viewed Richard as a promising talent for the future. Burns won that year's Severn Valley Rally outright despite being in a slower car.

In 1993, Burns joined the Subaru Rally Team for the British Rally Championship alongside Alister McRae in another Subaru Legacy. He won four rounds that year at the Vauxhall Sport, Pirelli, Scottish, and Manx International to become BRC's youngest champion. In the wake of his domestic success, plus a commendable seventh-place finish at a very snowy British WRC round, Burns remained with Subaru for the 1994 and 1995 seasons. He then competed in the Asia Pacific Rally Championship, which included rallies in New Zealand and Australia, but it also allowed him chances at his home event. At the end of 1995, Burns scored an impressive third place in the RAC Rally behind his Subaru teammates fighting for the overall championship, with Carlos Sainz (already a double world champion) finishing second, and Colin McRae winning his first and only WRC title.

=== WRC ===
==== 1996–1998: Mitsubishi ====
1996 saw an opening with Mitsubishi Ralliart at international level, seized upon with sufficient vigour to guide Burns to victory on that year's Rally New Zealand – albeit then, only a fixture within the Asia-Pacific Rally Championship and the FIA 2-Litre World Rally Cup. Even so, the fending off of such calibre competition as works-backed Subaru heavyweights Kenneth Eriksson and Piero Liatti only added gloss to an increasingly favoured reputation. In 1997, he was driving a same car as his team-mate Tommi Mäkinen had, Group A Mitsubishi Lancer Evolution III, IV, V; however it was re-badged as Carisma GT. His results continued to improve in 1997, from the eight rallies he participated in, he finished in fourth place five separate times, and was second at the Safari Rally, placing him seventh overall in the championship.

Come 1998, Burns had won his maiden World Rally Championship event on the Safari, which was known as the most challenging and difficult rally. He then added a second career victory on his swansong outing for Mitsubishi on that year's Rally GB, the event where Toyota's Carlos Sainz had a dramatic late retirement from fourth that secured the drivers' title for his team-mate, Tommi Makinen (who retired early in the event), as well as confirming the constructors' accolade for Mitsubishi.

==== 1999–2001: Return to Subaru ====
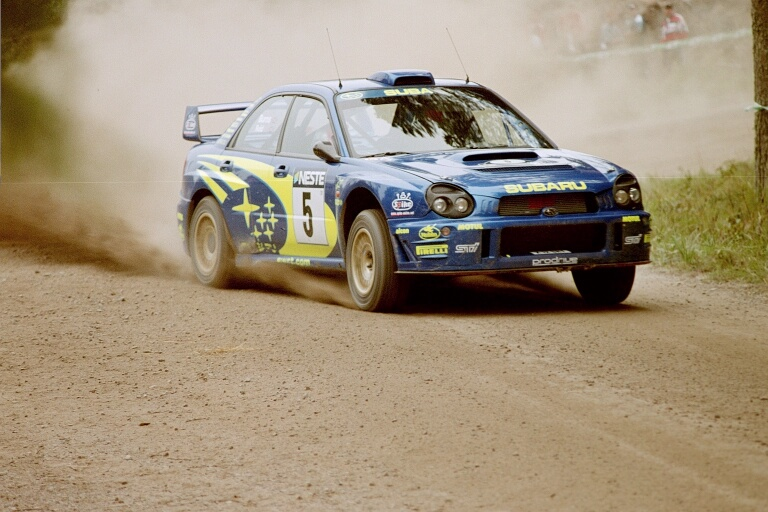
Burns driving a Subaru Impreza WRC at the 2001 Rally Finland.

Burns returned to the Prodrive-run Subaru World Rally Team under David Richards for the 1999 season, joining Juha Kankkunen and Bruno Thiry as part of the factory team driving Subaru Impreza WRCs, replacing Ford-bound fellow Briton, Colin McRae. Burns worked his way to a career high of second place in the drivers' standings, adding to his win tally. He also led Subaru to second in the constructors' series behind the Formula One departing Toyota Team Europe. On that year's Rally Argentina, he was upstaged for victory by virtue of a team order mix-up by veteran team-mate Kankkunen. Burns again finished second behind Kankkunen at the 1000 Lakes Rally, which was considered to be impressive given it was only his second start on a rally known for favouring experienced drivers. He was a long-time contender for the title in 2000, but crashed out on the Rally Finland in mid-season handing the momentum to eventual champion, and future team-mate, the Peugeot driver Marcus Grönholm who had been competing in his first year as a full-time factory driver. Even so, a stirling comeback from the lower reaches of the top thirty to win on the season-ending Rally of Great Britain kept the Burns name well entrenched within public consciousness.

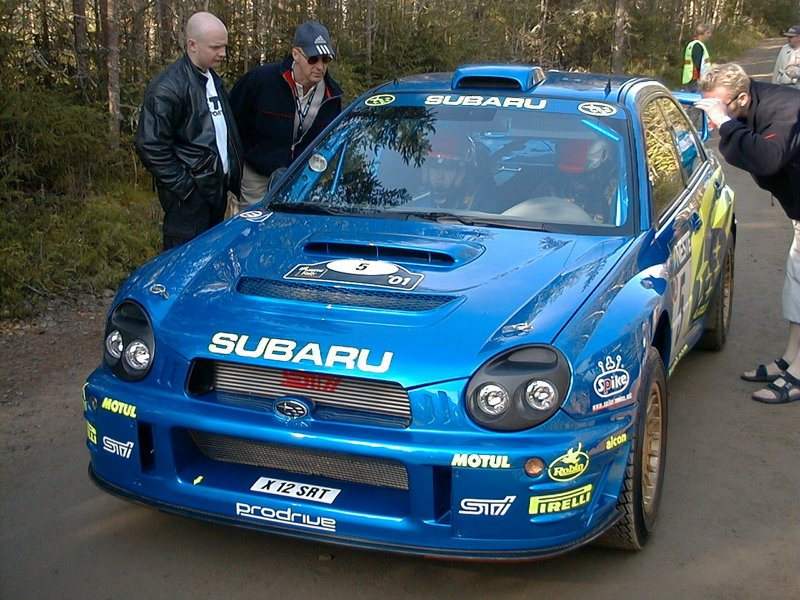
Burns at the 2001 Rally Finland.

The 2001 rally season began inauspiciously for Burns – neither of the season curtain raisers, the Monte Carlo Rally or the Swedish Rally, yielded points scores, placing in peril before it had begun, the Englishman's title bid. Fourth place in a rain-drenched Portugal kicked his campaign into action prior to second-place finishes on the gravel rallies of Argentina and Cyprus, on both occasions to Ford's Colin McRae. Nonetheless, both the Scotsman and Monte Carlo victor Tommi Mäkinen were later to hit upon snags of their own, while Burns's own consistent points scoring culminated in a first and only individual rally victory of the season in New Zealand, with McRae beaten into second. Burns then finished second on the Rally Australia to close within two points of new standalone series leader McRae, although the Scotsman and Mäkinen were to struggle to fifth and sixth respectively on this event (and the last of the drivers' points-scoring positions) amid controversy over McRae arriving to time control too late at the end of the first leg of the event to be able to choose a favourable running order on the ball-bearing gravel for day two. Meanwhile, the Finn, for his part, continued to struggle with a newly homologated version of the Mitsubishi Lancer Evolution World Rally Car he had been entrusted with, which had only been introduced by his team a few rounds earlier in San Remo. A four-way title decider, also including nine-point adrift outsider, Ford driver Carlos Sainz, thus beckoned on the final round of the series in Great Britain.

There, all three of Burns's rivals were to have suffered retirement from the event by the end of the second leg proceedings on Saturday. On Sunday, 25 November 2001, therefore, Burns's third-place finish behind Peugeot duo Gronholm and Harri Rovanperä enabled him to become the first Englishman to win the World Rally Championship, with 44 points, he was world champion with the lowest points total since the Formula 1-styled point system was introduced in 1997. When Burns passed the finishing line at the final stage of the final rally in 2001, he uttered words thought to be paying tribute to his codriver Robert Reid: "You're the best in the world". To commemorate the title success, Subaru produced a special edition of the Subaru Impreza in the UK called the RB5. A messy legal battle ensued for the Englishman's services for the following 2002 season, from which fresh suitors, 2000 and 2001 manufacturers' champions Peugeot emerged victorious.

==== 2002–2003: Return to Peugeot ====
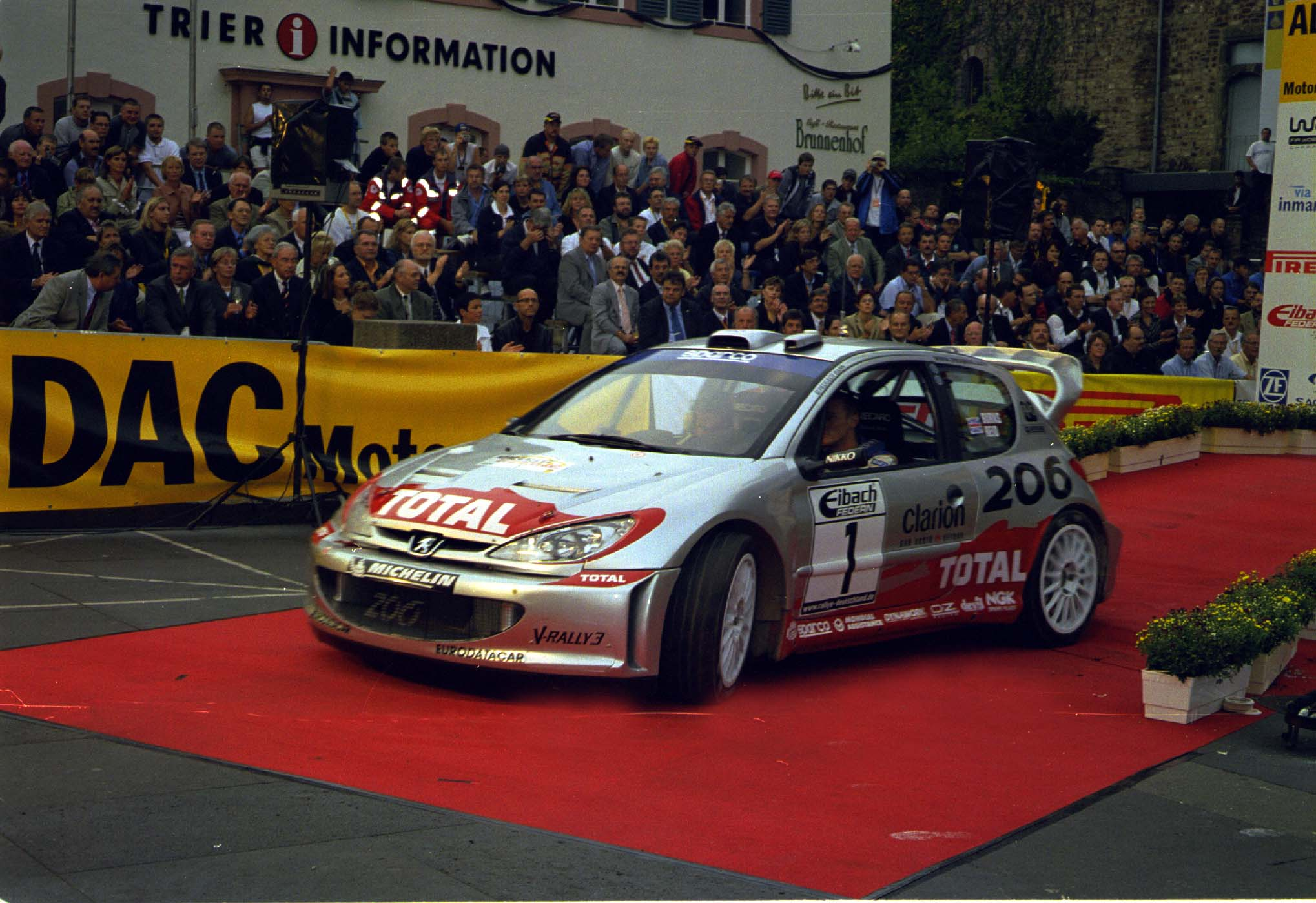
Burns with a Peugeot 206 WRC at the 2002 Rallye Deutschland

Burns returned to the Peugeot for the 2002 season. Although Peugeot were the pacesetting team of the period, Burns had difficulty matching the pace of team-mates Marcus Grönholm (on gravel) and Gilles Panizzi (on tarmac). Therefore, the existing tally of ten WRC triumphs were not to be added to, with the quest for a second world title proving equally fruitless for Burns. He won the Rally Argentina, but soon he was disqualified as his 206 was found underweight, handing the victory to Sainz, and in Rally New Zealand, he was leading until towards the end of day 2 when he rolled his car, forcing him to retire. He cobbled together a title challenge, albeit founded more on regular podium finishes than on victories, for much of the 2003 season – a feat which did not convince him to remain at the wheel of the 206 WRC.

In the 2003 season, Burns was still winless, although seven podiums means he led the championship at most of the season. The gloomy prospect of a continued winning drought with the French team left Burns poised to rejoin Subaru, having signed for them for the second time beginning with the 2004 season, the ploy being to couple him with the eventual 2003 title winner, Norway's Petter Solberg. In November 2003, however, with the Englishman heading to the season-ending Wales Rally GB still with a chance of winning the title, Burns suffered a blackout while driving with Ford driver Markko Märtin to the rally. He was withdrawn from the event, and thus the title fight, and was later diagnosed with an astrocytoma, a type of malignant brain tumour. Treatment during 2004 was followed by surgery in April 2005 that was described as "very successful"; however, the diagnosis that this type of brain tumor was malignant was only soon realised. In August 2005, a fan day was made in which Burns's supporters were invited to see his private car collection, but he was unable to drive so his co-driver Robert Reid took the seat on his private cars.

==== WRC victories ====
| # | Event | Season | Co-driver | Car |
|---|---|---|---|---|
| 1 | (Kenya) Safari Rally | 1998 | Robert Reid | Mitsubishi Lancer Evolution IV |
| 2 | (United Kingdom) Rally of Great Britain | 1998 | Robert Reid | Mitsubishi Lancer Evolution V |
| 3 | (Greece) Acropolis Rally | 1999 | Robert Reid | Subaru Impreza WRC 99 |
| 4 | Rally Australia | 1999 | Robert Reid | Subaru Impreza WRC 99 |
| 5 | (United Kingdom) Rally of Great Britain | 1999 | Robert Reid | Subaru Impreza WRC 99 |
| 6 | (Kenya) Safari Rally | 2000 | Robert Reid | Subaru Impreza WRC 99 |
| 7 | Rallye de Portugal | 2000 | Robert Reid | Subaru Impreza WRC 00 |
| 8 | Rally Argentina | 2000 | Robert Reid | Subaru Impreza WRC 00 |
| 9 | (United Kingdom) Rally of Great Britain | 2000 | Robert Reid | Subaru Impreza WRC 00 |
| 10 | Rally New Zealand | 2001 | Robert Reid | Subaru Impreza WRC 2001 |

== Complete WRC results ==
| Year | Entrant | Car | 1 | 2 | 3 | 4 | 5 | 6 | 7 | 8 | 9 | 10 | 11 | 12 | 13 | 14 | WDC | Points |
|---|---|---|---|---|---|---|---|---|---|---|---|---|---|---|---|---|---|---|
| 1990 | Peugeot Talbot Sport | Peugeot 309 GTI | MON | POR | KEN | FRA | GRE | NZL | ARG | FIN | AUS | ITA | IVO | GBR; 28 | | | NC | 0 |
| 1991 | Peugeot Talbot Sport | Peugeot 309 GTI | MON | SWE | POR | KEN | FRA | GRE | NZL | ARG | FIN | AUS | ITA | IVO | ESP | GBR; 16 | NC | 0 |
| 1992 | Richard Burns | Peugeot 309 GTI | MON | SWE | POR | KEN | FRA | GRE | NZL | ARG | FIN | AUS | ITA | IVO | ESP | GBR; Ret | NC | 0 |
| 1993 | 555 Subaru World Rally Team | Subaru Legacy RS | MON | SWE | POR | KEN | FRA | GRE | ARG | NZL | FIN | AUS | ITA | ESP | GBR; 7 | | 43rd | 4 |
| 1994 | SMSG / N. Koseki | Subaru Impreza WRX | MON | POR | KEN; 5 | FRA | GRE | ARG | | | | | | | | | 20th | 8 |
| 1994 | 555 Subaru World Rally Team | Subaru Impreza 555 | | | | | | | NZL; Ret | FIN | ITA | GBR; Ret | | | | | 20th | 8 |
| 1995 | 555 Subaru World Rally Team | Subaru Impreza 555 | MON | SWE | POR; 7 | FRA | NZL; Ret | AUS | ESP | GBR; 3 | | | | | | | 9th | 16 |
| 1996 | Mitsubishi Ralliart | Mitsubishi Lancer Evo III | SWE | KEN | INA; Ret | GRE | ARG; 4 | FIN | AUS; 5 | ITA | ESP; Ret | | | | | | 9th | 18 |
| 1997 | Mitsubishi Ralliart | Mitsubishi Lancer Evo IV | MON | SWE | KEN; 2 | POR; Ret | ESP | FRA | ARG; Ret | GRE; 4 | NZL; 4 | FIN | INA; 4 | ITA | AUS; 4 | GBR; 4 | 7th | 21 |
| 1998 | Mitsubishi Ralliart | Mitsubishi Lancer Evo IV | MON; 5 | SWE; 15 | KEN; 1 | POR; 4 | | | | | | | | | | | 6th | 33 |
| 1998 | Mitsubishi Ralliart | Mitsubishi Lancer Evo V | | | | | ESP; 4 | FRA; Ret | ARG; 4 | GRE; Ret | NZL; 9 | FIN; 5 | ITA; 7 | AUS; Ret | GBR; 1 | | 6th | 33 |
| 1999 | Subaru World Rally Team | Subaru Impreza WRC99 | MON; 8 | SWE; 5 | KEN; Ret | POR; 4 | ESP; 5 | FRA; 7 | ARG; 2 | GRE; 1 | NZL; Ret | FIN; 2 | CHN; 2 | ITA; Ret | AUS; 1 | GBR; 1 | 2nd | 55 |
| 2000 | Subaru World Rally Team | Subaru Impreza WRC99 | MON; Ret | SWE; 5 | KEN; 1 | | | | | | | | | | | | 2nd | 60 |
| 2000 | Subaru World Rally Team | Subaru Impreza WRC2000 | | | | POR; 1 | ESP; 2 | ARG; 1 | GRE; Ret | NZL; Ret | FIN; Ret | CYP; 4 | FRA; 4 | ITA; Ret | AUS; 2 | GBR; 1 | 2nd | 60 |
| 2001 | Subaru World Rally Team | Subaru Impreza WRC2001 | MON; Ret | SWE; 16 | POR; 4 | ESP; 7 | ARG; 2 | CYP; 2 | GRE; Ret | KEN; Ret | FIN; 2 | NZL; 1 | ITA; Ret | FRA; 4 | AUS; 2 | GBR; 3 | 1st | 44 |
| 2002 | Peugeot Total | Peugeot 206 WRC | MON; 8 | SWE; 4 | FRA; 3 | ESP; 2 | CYP; 2 | ARG; DSQ | GRE; Ret | KEN; Ret | FIN; 2 | GER; 2 | ITA; 4 | NZL; Ret | AUS; Ret | GBR; Ret | 5th | 34 |
| 2003 | Marlboro Peugeot Total | Peugeot 206 WRC | MON; 5 | SWE; 3 | TUR; 2 | NZL; 2 | ARG; 3 | GRE; 4 | CYP; Ret | GER; 3 | FIN; 3 | AUS; 3 | ITA; 7 | FRA; 8 | ESP; Ret | GBR; WD | 4th | 58 |

=== APRC results ===
| Year | Entrant | Car | 1 | 2 | 3 | 4 | 5 | 6 | APRC | Points |
|---|---|---|---|---|---|---|---|---|---|---|
| 1993 | Richard Burns | Subaru Legacy 4WD Turbo | IDN | NZL | MYS | AUS | THA; 2 | | ? | ? |
| 1994 | 555 Subaru World Rally Team | Subaru Impreza 555 | IDN; Ret | NZL; Ret | MYS; 2 | AUS; 5 | HKG; 2 | THA; 2 | 3rd | 45 |
| 1995 | 555 Subaru World Rally Team | Subaru Impreza 555 | IDN | NZL; Ret | MYS | AUS | HKG; 3 | THA; 3 | ? | ? |
| 1996 | Petronas Mitsubishi Ralliart | Mitsubishi Lancer Evo III | THA; Ret | IDN; Ret | MYS; 2 | NZL; 1 | AUS; 5 | HKG; 2 | 2nd | 58 |
| 1997 | Mitsubishi Ralliart | Mitsubishi Lancer Evo III | THA | CHN | NZL; 4 | MYS | IDN; 4 | AUS; 4 | 6th | 30 |

== Personal life ==
In 2001, Burns emigrated from Britain to Andorra, reportedly for tax purposes.

== Death ==
Late on Friday, 25 November 2005, four years to the day after winning the 2001 World Rally Championship, Burns died at the Wellington Hospital in St John’s Wood, London, aged 34, after having been in a coma for some days as a result of a brain tumour. A memorial service was held at St Luke's Church, Chelsea on Thursday 22 December 2005, with readings from BBC TV's Jeremy Clarkson and Steve Rider, and a tribute paid by one of his closest friends, photographer Colin McMaster. He was buried at St Peter and St Paul, Checkendon.

British television show Top Gear aired a tribute to Burns. The host, Jeremy Clarkson, said that "the news has been completely dominated, as far as we're concerned, by the sad death of Richard Burns." No other motoring news was announced in that episode. Burns had previously appeared on Top Gear twice, once touting rallying as more interesting and influential than Formula One, and then test-driving the Peugeot RC.

Subaru paid tribute to Burns at Castle Combe in 2006, when over fifty Subaru Impreza RB5s took to the track, including the RB5 No. 001 driven by Alex Burns, Richard's father. They also released a special edition Impreza WRX STI in 2007 – the RB320 – in memory of Burns. It features a 320 bhp (240 kW) Prodrive Performance Pack, Prodrive developed suspension, sports spring kit and is available only in obsidian black colour. Proceeds went to the RB Foundation.

During the 2006 Goodwood Festival of Speed, the RB foundation, named for Burns's initials, was inaugurated, with its stated aim being to "inspire and support people with serious injury and illness." The foundation also raises money for the Michael Park Fund, which deals with improving safety in motorsport events. British band Travis dedicated their album The Boy with No Name (2007) to Burns's memory.

=== Richard Burns Trophy ===
In 2006, the young driver's award in the Wales Rally GB was renamed the Richard Burns Trophy in his honour. It is awarded to the highest placed, non-priority driver who is 25 years old or younger.

== See also ==
- Richard Burns Rally, the video game starring Richard Burns.
- List of notable brain tumor patients
- The Under 17 Car Club

Awards and achievements
| Preceded by Colin McRae | Autosport; National Rally Driver of the Year; 1993 | Succeeded by Malcolm Wilson |
| Preceded by Tommi Mäkinen | Autosport; International Rally Driver Award; 2000–2001 | Succeeded by Marcus Grönholm |
Sporting positions
| Preceded by Marcus Grönholm | World Rally Champion; 2001 | Succeeded by Marcus Grönholm |
