= 1991 World Rally Championship =

19th season of the FIA World Rally Championship

Champions
- World Drivers' Champion: Juha Kankkunen
- World Manufacturers' Champion: Lancia

Seasons
- ← 1990 1992 →

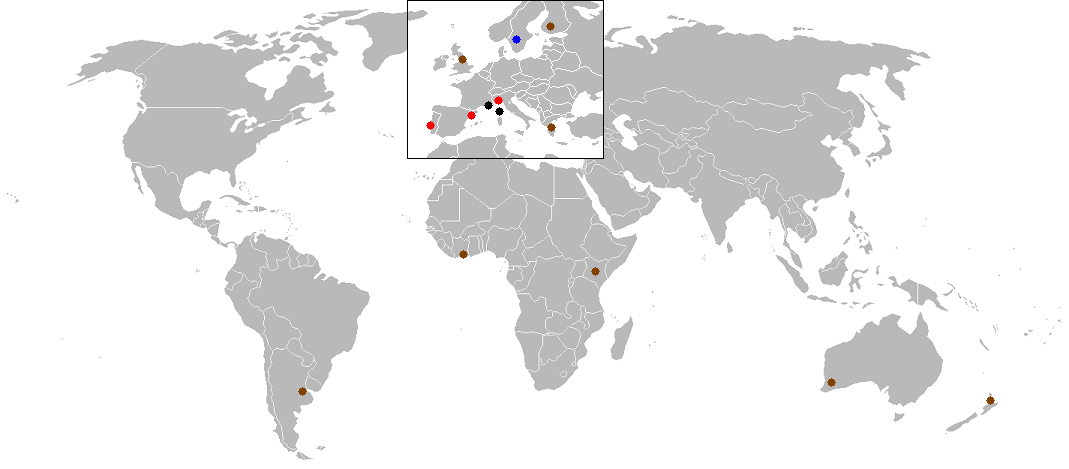
WRC-1991

The 1991 World Rally Championship was the 19th season of the Fédération Internationale de l'Automobile (FIA) World Rally Championship (WRC). The season consisted of 14 rallies. The drivers' world championship was won by Juha Kankkunen in a Lancia Delta Integrale 16V, ahead of Carlos Sainz and Didier Auriol. The manufacturers' title was won by Lancia, ahead of Toyota and Mitsubishi.

== Calendar ==
Rd.	Start date	Finish date	Rally	Rally headquarters	Surface	Stages	Distance	Points
1	26 January	30 January	(Monaco) 59th Rallye Automobile Monte-Carlo	Monte Carlo	Mixed	27	628.64 km	Drivers & Manufacturers
2	16 February	18 February	(Sweden) 40th International Swedish Rally	Karlstad, Värmland County	Snow	29	519.90 km	Drivers only
3	5 March	9 March	25th Rallye de Portugal - Vinho do Porto	Estoril, Lisbon	Mixed	38	564.20 km	Drivers & Manufacturers
4	27 March	1 April	(Kenya) 39th Martini Safari Rally	Nairobi	Gravel	N/A	4335.36 km	Drivers & Manufacturers
5	28 April	1 May	35th Tour de Corse - Rallye de France	Ajaccio, Corsica	Tarmac	27	626.21 km	Drivers & Manufacturers
6	2 June	5 June	(Greece) 38th Acropolis Rally	Athens	Gravel	48	597.35 km	Drivers & Manufacturers
7	26 June	30 June	22nd Rothmans Rally New Zealand	Manukau, Auckland	Gravel	40	630.66 km	Drivers only
8	23 July	27 July	11th Rally YPF Argentina	Buenos Aires	Gravel	30	594.20 km	Drivers & Manufacturers
9	22 August	25 August	(Finland) 41st 1000 Lakes Rally	Jyväskylä, Central Finland	Gravel	42	524.26 km	Drivers & Manufacturers
10	20 September	24 September	4th Commonwealth Bank Rally Australia	Perth, Western Australia	Gravel	39	592.59 km	Drivers & Manufacturers
11	13 October	17 October	(Italy) 33rd Rallye Sanremo - Rallye d'Italia	Sanremo, Liguria	Mixed	31	572.57 km	Drivers & Manufacturers
12	27 October	31 October	(Ivory Coast) 23rd Rallye Cote d'Ivoire - Bandama	Abidjan	Gravel	N/A	3272.82 km	Drivers only
13	10 November	13 November	(Spain) 27th Rallye Catalunya - Costa Brava - Rallye de España	Lloret de Mar, Catalonia	Mixed	35	594.01 km	Drivers only
14	24 November	27 November	(United Kingdom) 47th Lombard RAC Rally	Harrogate, North Yorkshire	Gravel	37	565.51 km	Drivers & Manufacturers

== Teams and drivers ==
=== Group A major entries ===
Team	Manufacturer	Car	Tyre	Drivers	Co-drivers	Rounds
(Japan) Marlboro Toyota Team Europe	Toyota	Celica GT-4 (ST165)	P	(Spain) Carlos Sainz	(Spain) Luis Moya	1, 3–11, 13–14
(Japan) Marlboro Toyota Team Europe	Toyota	Celica GT-4 (ST165)	P	(Germany) Armin Schwarz	(Sweden) Arne Hertz	1, 3, 5–6, 9–11, 13
(Japan) Marlboro Toyota Team Europe	Toyota	Celica GT-4 (ST165)	P	(Sweden) Mats Jonsson	(Sweden) Lars Bäckman	2, 9
(Japan) Marlboro Toyota Team Europe	Toyota	Celica GT-4 (ST165)	P	(Sweden) Mikael Ericsson	(Sweden) Claes Billstam	4, 6, 8
(Japan) Marlboro Toyota Team Europe	Toyota	Celica GT-4 (ST165)	P	(United Arab Emirates) Mohammed Ben Sulayem	(Republic of Ireland) Ronan Morgan	8
(Japan) Marlboro Toyota Team Europe	Toyota	Celica GT-4 (ST165)	P	(Australia) Neal Bates	(Australia) David Jorgensen	10
(Japan) Toyota Fina Team	Toyota	Celica GT-4 (ST165)	P	(Belgium) Marc Duez	(Germany) Klaus Wicha	1, 3, 5, 14
(Japan) Toyota Fina Team	Toyota	Celica GT-4 (ST165)	P	(Belgium) Renaud Verreydt	(Belgium) Georges Biar	11
Toyota Team Sweden	Toyota	Celica GT-4 (ST165)	P	(Sweden) Leif Asterhag	(Sweden) Claes Billstam	2
Toyota Kenya	Toyota	Celica GT-4 (ST165)	P	(Sweden) Björn Waldegård	(United Kingdom) Fred Gallagher	4
Toyota Team Finland	Toyota	Celica GT-4 (ST165)	P	(Finland) Antero Laine	(Finland) Jari Kiviniemi	9
Toyota Team Finland	Toyota	Celica GT-4 (ST165)	P	(Finland) Marcus Grönholm	(Finland) Juha Repo	9
(France) Adolphe Choteau	Toyota	Corolla AE86	?	(France) Adolphe Choteau	(France) Jean-Pierre Claverie	12
(Switzerland) Jean-Claude Dupuis	Toyota	Corolla AE86	?	(Switzerland) Jean-Claude Dupuis	(France) Nathalie Chastagnol	12
(Italy) Martini Lancia	Lancia	Delta Integrale 16V	M	(Finland) Juha Kankkunen	(Finland) Juha Piironen	1, 3–4, 6–11, 13–14
(Italy) Martini Lancia	Lancia	Delta Integrale 16V	M	(Italy) Miki Biasion	(Italy) Tiziano Siviero	1, 3–4, 6, 8, 11, 14
(Italy) Martini Lancia	Lancia	Delta Integrale 16V	M	(Argentina) Jorge Recalde	(Argentina) Martin Christie	4, 6, 8, 10, 13
(Italy) Martini Lancia	Lancia	Delta Integrale 16V	M	(France) Yves Loubet	(France) Jean-Paul Chiaroni	5
(Italy) Jolly Club	Lancia	Delta Integrale 16V	M	(France) Didier Auriol	(France) Bernard Occelli	1–3, 5–11, 14
(Italy) Jolly Club	Lancia	Delta Integrale 16V	M	(Italy) Andrea Aghini	(Italy) Sauro Farnocchia	11, 13
(Italy) Jolly Club	Lancia	Delta Integrale 16V	M	(Italy) Dario Cerrato	(Italy) Giuseppe Cerri	11
(Italy) Jolly Club	Lancia	Delta Integrale 16V	M	(Uruguay) Gustavo Trelles	(Uruguay) Daniel Muzio	13
(Italy) Lancia Fina	Lancia	Delta Integrale 16V	M	(France) Bruno Saby	(France) Daniel Grataloup	1, 5
(Italy) Lancia Fina	Lancia	Delta Integrale 16V	M	(France) Bruno Saby	(France) Jean-François Fauchille	14
(Italy) Lancia Fina	Lancia	Delta Integrale 16V	M	(France) Yves Loubet	(France) Jean-Paul Chiaroni	1
(Sweden) Clarion Team Europe	Lancia	Delta Integrale 16V	M	(Sweden) Per Eklund	(Sweden) Jan-Olof Bohlin	2, 14
(Portugal) Duriforte SG Gigante	Lancia	Delta Integrale 16V	M	(Portugal) Carlos Bica	(Portugal) Fernando Prata	3
(Austria) Ernst Harrach sen.	Lancia	Delta Integrale 16V	?	(Austria) Ernst Harrach sen.	(Germany) Michael Uhl	3
(Italy) Astra Racing	Lancia	Delta Integrale 16V	P	(Finland) Minna Sillankorva	(Italy) Michela Marangoni	5–6, 8–9, 11, 13
(Italy) Astra Racing	Lancia	Delta Integrale 16V	M	(Uruguay) Gustavo Trelles	(Uruguay) Ricardo Ivetich	8, 11
(Italy) Astra Racing	Lancia	Delta Integrale 16V	P	(Italy) Michele Gregis	(Italy) Claudio Giachino	11
(Italy) Astra Racing	Lancia	Delta Integrale 16V	P	(Italy) Piergiorgio Deila	(Italy) Pierangelo Scalvini	11
(Greece) "Jigger"	Lancia	Delta Integrale 16V	M	(Greece) "Jigger"	(Greece) Konstantinos Stefanis	6
(Italy) A.R.T. Engineering	Lancia	Delta Integrale 16V	P	(Italy) Piero Liatti	(Italy) Luciano Tedeschini	11
(Italy) A.R.T. Engineering	Lancia	Delta Integrale 16V	P	(Italy) Gilberto Pianezzola	(Italy) Loris Roggia	11
(Spain) Escudería Telde	Lancia	Delta Integrale 16V	M	(Spain) Luis Monzón	(Spain) Álex Romaní	13
(Spain) Jesús Puras	Lancia	Delta Integrale 16V	M	(Spain) Jesús Puras	(Spain) José Arrarte	13
(Japan) Mitsubishi Ralliart	Mitsubishi	Galant VR-4	M	(Finland) Timo Salonen	(Finland) Voitto Silander	1–2, 6, 9–10, 14
(Japan) Mitsubishi Ralliart	Mitsubishi	Galant VR-4	M	(Sweden) Kenneth Eriksson	(Sweden) Staffan Parmander	1–2, 6, 9–10, 14
(Japan) Mitsubishi Ralliart	Mitsubishi	Galant VR-4	M	(Germany) Ronald Holzer	(Germany) Klaus Wendel	1, 5
(Japan) Mitsubishi Ralliart	Mitsubishi	Galant VR-4	M	(Finland) Lasse Lampi	(Finland) Pentti Kuukkala	2, 9, 14
(Japan) Mitsubishi Ralliart	Mitsubishi	Galant VR-4	Y	(Japan) Kenjiro Shinozuka	(United Kingdom) John Meadows	4, 12
(Japan) Mitsubishi Ralliart	Mitsubishi	Galant VR-4	Y	(Australia) Ross Dunkerton	(Lithuania) Fred Gocentas	7, 10
(France) Patrick Tauziac	Mitsubishi	Galant VR-4	Y	(France) Patrick Tauziac	(France) Claude Papin	12
(Japan) Mazda Rally Team Europe	Mazda	323 GTX	M	(Finland) Hannu Mikkola	(Sweden) Johnny Johansson	1–3, 6, 9, 14
(Japan) Mazda Rally Team Europe	Mazda	323 GTX	M	(Spain) Jesús Puras	(Spain) José Arrarte	1, 3
(Japan) Mazda Rally Team Europe	Mazda	323 GTX	M	(Sweden) Ingvar Carlsson	(Sweden) Per Carlsson	2, 7, 10
(Japan) Mazda Rally Team Europe	Mazda	323 GTX	M	(Finland) Tommi Mäkinen	(Finland) Seppo Harjanne	9, 14
Mazda Team Sweden	Mazda	323 GTX	M	(Sweden) 'Nalle'	(Sweden) Anders Olsson	2
(New Zealand) Mazda Rally Team Asia Pacific	Mazda	323 GTX	?	(New Zealand) Rod Millen	(New Zealand) Tony Sircombe	7, 10
(New Zealand) Neil Allport	Mazda	323 GTX	?	(New Zealand) Neil Allport	(New Zealand) Jim Robb	7
Mazda Rally Team Finland	Mazda	323 GTX	D	(Finland) Mikael Sundström	(Finland) Jakke Honkanen	9
(Finland) Minna Sillankorva	Mazda	323 4WD	?	(Finland) Minna Sillankorva	(Italy) Michela Marangoni	1
(United Kingdom) Q8 Team Ford	Ford	Sierra RS Cosworth 4x4	P	(Italy) Alessandro Fiorio	(Italy) Luigi Pirollo	1, 3, 6, 11
(United Kingdom) Q8 Team Ford	Ford	Sierra RS Cosworth 4x4	P	(France) François Delecour	(France) Anne-Chantal Pauwels	1, 3, 5–6, 11
(United Kingdom) Q8 Team Ford	Ford	Sierra RS Cosworth 4x4	P	(France) François Delecour	(France) Daniel Grataloup	13–14
(United Kingdom) Q8 Team Ford	Ford	Sierra RS Cosworth 4x4	P	(United Kingdom) Malcolm Wilson	(United Kingdom) Nicky Grist	1, 3, 5–6, 11, 14
(United Kingdom) Q8 Team Ford	Ford	Sierra RS Cosworth 4x4	P	(United Kingdom) Gwyndaf Evans	(United Kingdom) Howard Davies	2, 14
(France) Ford Bastos Castrol	Ford	Sierra RS Cosworth 4x4	P	(France) Bernard Béguin	(France) Jean-Marc Andrié	5
(Italy) Ford Italia	Ford	Sierra RS Cosworth 4x4	P	(Italy) Gianfranco Cunico	(Italy) Stefano Evangelisti	5, 11
(New Zealand) Brian Stokes	Ford	Sierra RS Cosworth 4x4	?	(New Zealand) Brian Stokes	(New Zealand) Jeff Judd	7
Ford Finland	Ford	Sierra RS Cosworth 4x4	?	(Finland) Sebastian Lindholm	(Finland) Cedric Wrede	9
(United Kingdom) Louise Aitken-Walker	Ford	Sierra RS Cosworth 4x4	P	(United Kingdom) Louise Aitken-Walker	(Sweden) Christina Thörner	14
(Czech Republic) Škoda Motorsport	Škoda	Favorit 136 L	M	(Czech Republic) Pavel Sibera	(Czech Republic) Petr Gross	1, 6, 9, 14
(Czech Republic) Škoda Motorsport	Škoda	Favorit 136 L	M	(Finland) Kalevi Aho	(Finland) Carl-Johan Wolff	1, 9, 11
(Czech Republic) Škoda Motorsport	Škoda	Favorit 136 L	M	(Czech Republic) Vladimír Berger	(Czech Republic) Jiří Janeček	3, 6
(Czech Republic) Škoda Motorsport	Škoda	Favorit 136 L	M	(Portugal) Horácio Franco	(Portugal) Ricardo Jordão	3
(Japan) Subaru Rally Team Europe	Subaru	Legacy RS	M	(Finland) Markku Alén	(Finland) Ilkka Kivimäki	2–3, 6–7, 9–10, 14
(Japan) Subaru Rally Team Europe	Subaru	Legacy RS	M	(France) François Chatriot	(France) Michel Périn	2–3, 5
(Japan) Subaru Rally Team Europe	Subaru	Legacy RS	M	(New Zealand) Peter 'Possum' Bourne	(New Zealand) Rodger Freeth	7, 10
(Japan) Subaru Rally Team Europe	Subaru	Legacy RS	P	(United Kingdom) Colin McRae	(United Kingdom) Derek Ringer	14
(Kenya) Ian Duncan	Subaru	Legacy RS	M	(Kenya) Ian Duncan	(Kenya) David Williamson	4
(Kenya) Patrick Njiru	Subaru	Legacy RS	B	(Kenya) Patrick Njiru	(Kenya) Bob Khan	4, 10
Peugeot Dealer Team Sweden	Peugeot	309 GTI 16	M	(Sweden) Harry Joki	(Sweden) Ingemar Karlsson	2
Concessionnaires Peugeot France	Peugeot	309 GTI 16	M	(France) Patrick Magaud	(France) Guylène Brun	5
Concessionnaires Peugeot France	Peugeot	309 GTI 16	M	(France) Fabien Doenlen	(France) Evelyne Merciol	5
Peugeot Sport Finland	Peugeot	309 GTI 16	M	(Finland) Olavi Juntunen	(Finland) Kauko Mäki-Kuutti	9
(Spain) RACC Motorsport	Peugeot	309 GTI 16	M	(Spain) Joaquim Casasayas	(Spain) Manuel Dalmases	13
(United Kingdom) Peugeot Talbot Sport	Peugeot	309 GTI 16	D	(United Kingdom) Richard Burns	(United Kingdom) Robert Reid	14
(Japan) Nissan Motorsports Europe	Nissan	Sunny GTI-R	D	(Sweden) Stig Blomqvist	(Sweden) Benny Melander	4, 6, 9, 14
(Japan) Nissan Motorsports Europe	Nissan	Sunny GTI-R	D	(United Kingdom) David Llewellin	(United Kingdom) Peter Diekmann	4, 6, 9, 14
(Japan) Nissan Motorsports Europe	Nissan	Sunny GTI-R	D	(Kenya) Mike Kirkland	(Kenya) Surinder Thatthi	4
(Kenya) Ryce Motors Ltd.	Daihatsu	Charade	D	(Kenya) Guy Jack	(United Kingdom) Des Page-Morris	4
(Kenya) Ryce Motors Ltd.	Daihatsu	Charade	D	(Kenya) Steve Anthony	(Kenya) Philip Valentine	4
(Kenya) Ryce Motors Ltd.	Daihatsu	Charade	D	(Kenya) Ashok Pattni	(Kenya) Raffiq Cassam	4
(Kenya) Ryce Motors Ltd.	Daihatsu	Charade	D	(United Kingdom) Lynda Hughes-Morgan	(Australia) Vanessa Slee-Evans	4
(Austria) Stohl Racing	Audi	90 Quattro	M	(Austria) Rudolf Stohl	(Austria) Peter Diekmann	4, 8, 12
(France) Patrice Servant	Audi	90 Quattro	?	(France) Patrice Servant	(France) Thierry Pansolin	12
(France) Société Diac	Renault	Clio 16S	M	(France) Jean Ragnotti	(France) Gilles Thimonier	5
(France) Société Diac	Renault	Clio 16S	M	(France) Philippe Bugalski	(France) Denis Giraudet	5
Alfa Romeo France	Alfa Romeo	Alfa Romeo 75 Turbo	P	(France) Pierre-César Baroni	(France) Philippe David	5
Alfa Romeo France	Alfa Romeo	Alfa Romeo 75 Turbo	P	(France) Christine Driano	(France) Marie-Christine Lallement	5
(France) Citroën Sport	Citroën	AX Sport	M	(France) Laurent Poggi	(France) Didier Breton	5
(France) Citroën Sport	Citroën	AX Sport	M	(France) Sylvain Polo	(Monaco) "Tilber"	5
Opel Team Belgium	Opel	Kadett GSI 16V	P	(Belgium) Bruno Thiry	(Belgium) Stéphane Prévot	5, 11
(Spain) Opel Team España	Opel	Kadett GSI 16V	M	(Spain) Borja Moratal	(Spain) Arturo Fernández de La Puente	13
(Spain) Opel Team España	Opel	Corsa A GSi	M	(Spain) Luis Climent	(Spain) José Antonio Muñoz	13
(Spain) Opel Team España	Opel	Corsa A GSi	M	(Spain) Iñigo Lilly	(Spain) P Echevarria	13
(France) Patrick Bernardini	BMW	M3 E30	P	(France) Patrick Bernardini	(France) Philippe Dran-Padovani	5
(Soviet Union) Lada-Avtosport	Lada	Samara 21083	?	(Soviet Union) Sergey Alyasov	(Soviet Union) Aleksandr Levitan	6, 9, 14
(Soviet Union) Lada-Avtosport	Lada	Samara 21083	?	(Soviet Union) Aleksandr Artemenko	(Soviet Union) Viktor Timkovskiy	6, 9
(Japan) Team Suzuki	Suzuki	Swift GTi	?	(Japan) Nobuhiro Tajima	(Australia) Mark Nelson	10
(Japan) Team Suzuki	Suzuki	Swift GTi	?	(Malaysia) Kenny Lam	(Australia) Graeme Palmer	10
(Belgium) East Belgian Racing Team	Suzuki	Cultus GTI	?	(Belgium) Damien Chaballe	(Belgium) Jacky Delvaux	12

=== FIA Group N Cup major entries ===
Team	Manufacturer	Car	Tyre	Drivers	Co-drivers	Rounds
(Italy) Rally Team Italia	Mazda	323 GTX	M	(Belgium) Grégoire de Mevius	(France) Hervé Sauvage	1, 3, 6, 8, 11, 14
(Belgium) Nicolas Min	Mazda	323 GTX	?	(Belgium) Nicolas Min	(Belgium) Joseph Lambert	12
(Monaco) Christophe Spiliotis	Ford	Sierra RS Cosworth 4x4	M	(Monaco) Christophe Spiliotis	(Monaco) Isabelle Spiliotis	1, 3
(France) Eric Mauffrey	Ford	Sierra RS Cosworth 4x4	?	(France) Eric Mauffrey	(France) Hélène Main-Debard	1
(France) Jacques Tasso	Ford	Sierra RS Cosworth 4x4	?	(France) Jacques Tasso	(France) Michèle Ranchoux	1
(Monaco) "Tchine"	Ford	Sierra RS Cosworth 4x4	?	(Monaco) "Tchine"	(France) Jean-Pierre Fricout	1, 8, 11
Promoracing Finland	Ford	Sierra RS Cosworth 4x4	D	(Finland) Tommi Mäkinen	(Finland) Seppo Harjanne	2–3
(Spain) Canarias Sport Club	Ford	Sierra RS Cosworth 4x4	M	(Spain) Fernando Capdevila	(Spain) Alfredo Rodríguez	3, 5–6, 8–9, 11, 13–14
(Portugal) Amocargo	Ford	Sierra RS Cosworth 4x4	?	(Portugal) Fernando Peres	(Portugal) Ricardo Caldeira	3
(France) Jean-Marie Santoni	Ford	Sierra RS Cosworth 4x4	M	(France) Jean-Marie Santoni	(France) Marcel Cesarini	5
(Argentina) Mike Little Preparations	Ford	Sierra RS Cosworth 4x4	P	(Argentina) Carlos Menem jr.	(Argentina) Victor Zucchini	6, 8, 13–14
(Italy) GPR Star Racing	Ford	Sierra RS Cosworth 4x4	P	(Italy) Giovanni Manfrinato	(Italy) Andrea Pietro Renzo Nicoli	11
(United Kingdom) Shell / Asquith Autosport	Ford	Sierra RS Cosworth 4x4	D	(United Kingdom) Robbie Head	(United Kingdom) Campbell Roy	14
(United Kingdom) Jeremy Easson	Ford	Sierra RS Cosworth 4x4	D	(United Kingdom) Jeremy Easson	(United Kingdom) Alun Cook	14
(United Kingdom) Roderick Menzies	Ford	Sierra RS Cosworth 4x4	D	(United Kingdom) Roderick Menzies	(United Kingdom) Philip Stanway	14
(Australia) Ed Ordynski	Mitsubishi	Galant VR-4	B	(Australia) Ed Ordynski	(Australia) Harry Mansson	2, 7, 9–10
Mitsubishi Ralliart Sweden	Mitsubishi	Galant VR-4	M	(Sweden) Stig-Olov Walfridsson	(Sweden) Gunnar Barth	2
Mitsubishi Ralliart Sweden	Mitsubishi	Galant VR-4	M	(Sweden) Sören Nilsson	(Sweden) Per-Ove Persson	2
(New Zealand) Stuart Eyre	Mitsubishi	Galant VR-4	?	(New Zealand) Stuart Eyre	(New Zealand) Stuart McFarlane	7
(Finland) Tommi Mäkinen	Mitsubishi	Galant VR-4	?	(Finland) Tommi Mäkinen	(Finland) Seppo Harjanne	7
Mitsubishi Ralliart Finland	Mitsubishi	Galant VR-4	M	(Finland) Jouko Puhakka	(Finland) Keijo Eerola	9
Mitsubishi Ralliart Finland	Mitsubishi	Galant VR-4	M	(Finland) Arto Kumpumäki	(Finland) Veijo Vainio	9
(Australia) Westec Racing	Mitsubishi	Galant VR-4	?	(Australia) Challis Tolley	(Malaysia) Allen Oh	10
(Italy) Città di Castelfranco	Lancia	Delta Integrale 16V	?	(Italy) Piergiorgio Bedini	(Italy) Luca Bonvicini	3, 6, 11–12
(Kenya) Michael Hughes	Subaru	Legacy RS	?	(Kenya) Michael Hughes	(Kenya) Saleem Haji	4
(New Zealand) Brian Watkin	Subaru	Legacy RS	?	(New Zealand) Brian Watkin	(New Zealand) Stuart Roberts	7
(Japan) Yasuhiro Iwase	Toyota	Celica GT-4 (ST165)	?	(Japan) Yasuhiro Iwase	(Kenya) Sudhir Vinayak	4
(New Zealand) Ross Meekings	Toyota	Celica GT-4 (ST165)	?	(New Zealand) Ross Meekings	(New Zealand) Steve March	7
(Finland) Hockey Drivers	Toyota	Celica GT-4 (ST165)	M	(Finland) Mikko Kalliomaa	(Finland) Harri Steiner	9
(Japan) Hiroshi Nishiyama	Nissan	Sunny GTI-R	F	(Japan) Hiroshi Nishiyama	(Japan) Hiroki "Rocky" Sugiura	4, 6, 10, 12
(Greece) "Stratissino"	Nissan	Sunny GTI-R	P	(Greece) "Stratissino"	(Greece) Tonia Pavli	6
(France) Jean-Pierre Manzagol	Renault	5 GT Turbo	M	(France) Jean-Pierre Manzagol	(France) Georges Monti	5
(France) Philippe Doué	Renault	Clio 16S	?	(France) Philippe Doué	(France) Laurent Urlique	12
(France) Guy Fiori	BMW	325i E30	M	(France) Guy Fiori	(France) Xavier Pierlovisi	5
(Spain) José María Ponce	BMW	325 iX E30	?	(Spain) José María Ponce	(Spain) José Carlos Déniz	13

== Standings ==
=== Points scoring system ===
	1st	2nd	3rd	4th	5th	6th	7th	8th	9th	10th
Drivers' championship	20	15	12	10	8	6	4	3	2	1
Manufacturers' championship	20	17	14	12	10	8	6	4	2	1

=== Drivers' championship ===
Pos.	Driver	MON (Monaco)	SWE (Sweden)	POR (Portugal)	KEN (Kenya)	FRA (France)	GRE (Greece)	NZL (New Zealand)	ARG (Argentina)	FIN (Finland)	AUS (Australia)	ITA (Italy)	CIV (Ivory Coast)	ESP (Spain)	GBR (United Kingdom)	Points
1	(Finland) Juha Kankkunen	(5)		4	1		1	2	4	1	1	Ret		2	1	150
2	(Spain) Carlos Sainz	1		1	Ret	1	2	1	1	4	Ret	6		Ret	3	143
3	(France) Didier Auriol	Ret	9	2		2	4	3	3	2	Ret	1			12	101
4	(Italy) Miki Biasion	2		3	Ret		3		2			2			Ret	69
5	(Sweden) Kenneth Eriksson		1				7			3	2				2	66
6	(Germany) Armin Schwarz	4		Ret		Ret	5			9	3	8		1		55
7	(France) François Delecour	3		Ret		Ret	Ret					4		3	6	40
8	(Finland) Markku Alén		3	5			Ret	4		Ret	4				Ret	40
9	(Argentina) Jorge Recalde				3		Ret		5		8			6		29
10	(Sweden) Mikael Ericsson				2		6		6							27
11	(Japan) Kenjiro Shinozuka				8								1			23
12	(Sweden) Mats Jonsson		2							6						21
13	(Finland) Timo Salonen	8	Ret				Ret			DSQ	5				4	21
14	(Italy) Andrea Aghini											5		5		16
15	(France) Patrick Tauziac												2			15
16	(Sweden) Ingvar Carlsson		4					8			Ret					13
17	(Belgium) Marc Duez	11		Ret		4									8	13
18	(United Kingdom) Malcolm Wilson	7		Ret		5	Ret					10			Ret	13
19	(Italy) Gianfranco Cunico					3						Ret				12
20	(Italy) Dario Cerrato											3				12
21	(Austria) Rudi Stohl				Ret				Ret				3			12
22	(Finland) Ari Vatanen									7					5	12
23	(New Zealand) Rod Millen							6			6					12
24	(Sweden) Stig Blomqvist				5		Ret			8					Ret	11
25	(Finland) Hannu Mikkola	Ret	7	Ret			8			Ret					7	11
26	(Sweden) Björn Waldegård				4											10
27	(France) Patrice Servant												4			10
28	(Spain) Mía Bardolet													4		10
29	(Finland) Tommi Mäkinen		13	Ret				Ret		5					Ret	8
30	(Finland) Lasse Lampi		5							Ret					Ret	8
31	(New Zealand) Neil Allport							5								8
32	(Ivory Coast) Adolphe Choteau												5			8
33	(France) François Chatriot		19	6		9										8
34	(France) Bruno Saby	6				Ret									9	8
35	(France) Yves Loubet	9				6										8
36	(Sweden) Bjorn Johansson		6													6
37	(Kenya) Ian Duncan				6											6
38	(France) Philippe Doue												6			6
39	(Belgium) Grégoire de Mévius	Ret		8					9						22	5
40	(Spain) Jesús Puras	Ret		7										Ret		4
41	(Kenya) Mike Kirkland				7											4
42	(France) Patrick Bernardini					7										4
43	(New Zealand) Brian Stokes							7								4
44	(United Arab Emirates) Mohammed Ben Sulayem								7							4
45	(Australia) Ross Dunkerton							Ret			7					4
46	(Italy) Piero Liatti											7				4
47	(Belgium) Damien Chaballe												7			4
48	(Spain) Luis Monzon													7		4
49	(Sweden) Per Eklund		8												Ret	3
50	(France) Philippe Bugalski					8										3
51	(Uruguay) Gustavo Trelles								8			Ret		Ret		3
52	(Belgium) Nicolas Min												8			3
53	(Spain) Fernando Capdevila			13		Ret			Ret	26				8	Ret	3
54	(United Kingdom) David Llewellin				Ret		9			10						3
55	(Italy) Alex Fiorio	10		Ret			Ret					9				3
56	(Austria) Ernst Harrach			9												2
57	(Kenya) Guy Jack				9											2
58	(New Zealand) Ross Meekings							9								2
59	(Australia) Neal Bates										9					2
60	(Switzerland) Jean-Claude Dupuis												9			2
61	(Spain) Joaquim Casasayas													9		2
62	(Finland) Minna Sillankorva	18				Ret			10	22						1
63	(Sweden) Leif Asterhag		10													1
64	(Portugal) Carlos Bica			10												1
65	(Kenya) Steve Anthony				10											1
66	(France) Jean-Pierre Manzagol					10										1
67	(Greece) Giannis Vardinogiannis						10									1
68	(New Zealand) Brian Watkin							10								1
69	(Australia) Ed Ordynski							Ret		25	10					1
70	(Spain) Jose-Maria Ponce													10		1
71	(United Kingdom) Louise Aitken-Walker														10	1
Pos.	Driver	MON (Monaco)	SWE (Sweden)	POR (Portugal)	KEN (Kenya)	FRA (France)	GRE (Greece)	NZL (New Zealand)	ARG (Argentina)	FIN (Finland)	AUS (Australia)	ITA (Italy)	CIV (Ivory Coast)	ESP (Spain)	GBR (United Kingdom)	Points

=== Manufacturers' championship ===
Pos.	Manufacturer	MON (Monaco)	POR (Portugal)	KEN (Kenya)	FRA (France)	GRE (Greece)	ARG (Argentina)	FIN (Finland)	AUS (Australia)	ITA (Italy)	GBR (United Kingdom)	Points
1	(Italy) Lancia	(2)	(2)	1	(2)	1	2	1	1	1	1	137
2	(Japan) Toyota	1	1	2	1	2	1	(4)	3	(6)	(3)	128
3	(Japan) Mitsubishi	8		8		7		3	2		2	62
4	(United Kingdom) Ford	3			3			7		4	6	54
5	(Japan) Mazda		7			8	9	5	6		7	44
6	(Japan) Subaru		5	6	9				4		5	42
7	(Japan) Nissan			5		9		8				16
8	(Germany) BMW				7							6
9	(France) Renault				8							4
10	(Japan) Daihatsu			9								2
Pos.	Manufacturer	MON (Monaco)	POR (Portugal)	KEN (Kenya)	FRA (France)	GRE (Greece)	ARG (Argentina)	FIN (Finland)	AUS (Australia)	ITA (Italy)	GBR (United Kingdom)	Points

== Events ==
Round	Rally name	Start-end date	Podium drivers	Podium cars
1	(Monaco) Rallye Monte Carlo	24 January–30 January	1. (Spain) Carlos Sainz; 2. (Italy) Miki Biasion; 3. (France) François Delecour	1. Toyota Celica GT-Four ST165; 2. Lancia Integrale 16V; 3. Ford Sierra RS Cosworth 4x4
2	(Sweden) Swedish Rally	16 February–18 February	1. (Sweden) Kenneth Eriksson; 2. (Sweden) Mats Jonsson; 3. (Finland) Markku Alén	1. Mitsubishi Galant VR-4; 2. Toyota Celica GT-Four ST165; 3. Subaru Legacy RS
3	Rallye de Portugal	5 March–9 March	1. (Spain) Carlos Sainz; 2. (France) Didier Auriol; 3. (Italy) Miki Biasion	1. Toyota Celica GT-Four ST165; 2. Lancia Delta Integrale 16V; 3. Lancia Delta Integrale 16V
4	(Kenya) Safari Rally	27 March–1 April	1. (Finland) Juha Kankkunen; 2. (Sweden) Mikael Ericsson; 3. (Argentina) Jorge Recalde	1. Lancia Delta Integrale 16V; 2. Toyota Celica GT-Four ST165; 3. Lancia Integrale 16V
5	(France) Tour de Corse	28 April–1 May	1. (Spain) Carlos Sainz; 2. (France) Didier Auriol; 3. (Italy) Gianfranco Cunico	1. Toyota Celica GT-Four ST165; 2. Lancia Delta Integrale 16V; 3. Ford Sierra RS Cosworth 4x4
6	(Greece) Acropolis Rally	2 June–5 June	1. (Finland) Juha Kankkunen; 2. (Spain) Carlos Sainz; 3. (Italy) Miki Biasion	1. Lancia Delta Integrale 16V; 2. Toyota Celica GT-Four ST165; 3. Lancia Delta Integrale 16V
7	Rally New Zealand	26 June–30 June	1. (Spain) Carlos Sainz; 2. (Finland) Juha Kankkunen; 3. (France) Didier Auriol	1. Toyota Celica GT-Four ST165; 2. Lancia Delta Integrale 16V; 3. Lancia Delta Integrale 16V
8	Rally Argentina	23 July–27 July	1. (Spain) Carlos Sainz; 2. (Italy) Miki Biasion; 3. (France) Didier Auriol	1. Toyota Celica GT-Four ST165; 2. Lancia Delta Integrale 16V; 3. Lancia Delta Integrale 16V
9	(Finland) 1000 Lakes Rally	22 August–25 August	1. (Finland) Juha Kankkunen; 2. (France) Didier Auriol; 3. (Sweden) Kenneth Eriksson	1. Lancia Delta Integrale 16V; 2. Lancia Delta Integrale 16V; 3. Mitsubishi Galant VR-4
10	Rally Australia	20 September–24 September	1. (Finland) Juha Kankkunen; 2. (Sweden) Kenneth Eriksson; 3. (Germany) Armin Schwarz	1. Lancia Delta Integrale 16V; 2. Mitsubishi Galant VR-4; 3. Toyota Celica GT-Four ST165
11	(Italy) Rallye Sanremo	13 October–17 October	1. (France) Didier Auriol; 2. (Italy) Miki Biasion; 3. (Italy) Dario Cerrato	1. Lancia Delta Integrale 16V; 2. Lancia Delta Integrale 16V; 3. Lancia Delta Integrale 16V
12	(Ivory Coast) Rallye Côte d'Ivoire	27 October–31 October	1. (Japan) Kenjiro Shinozuka; 2. (France) Patrick Tauziac; 3. (Austria) Rudi Stohl	1. Mitsubishi Galant VR-4; 2. Mitsubishi Galant VR-4; 3. Audi 90 Quattro
13	(Spain) Rally Catalunya	10 November–13 November	1. (Germany) Armin Schwarz; 2. (Finland) Juha Kankkunen; 3. (France) François Delecour	1. Toyota Celica GT-Four ST165; 2. Lancia Delta Integrale 16V; 3. Ford Sierra RS Cosworth 4x4
14	(United Kingdom) RAC Rally	24 November–27 November	1. (Finland) Juha Kankkunen; 2. (Sweden) Kenneth Eriksson; 3. (Spain) Carlos Sainz	1. Lancia Delta Integrale 16V; 2. Mitsubishi Galant VR-4; 3. Toyota Celica GT-Four ST165
