= 1990 World Rally Championship =

18th season of the FIA World Rally Championship

Champions
- World Drivers' Champion: Carlos Sainz
- World Manufacturers' Champion: Lancia

Seasons
- ← 1989 1991 →

The 1990 World Rally Championship was the 18th season of the FIA World Rally Championship. The season consisted of 12 rallies. The drivers' world championship was won by Carlos Sainz in a Toyota Celica GT-Four ST165, ahead of Didier Auriol and Juha Kankkunen. The manufacturers' title was won by Lancia, ahead of Toyota and Mitsubishi.

== Calendar ==
Rd.	Start date	Finish date	Rally	Rally headquarters	Surface	Stages	Distance	Points
1	21 January	25 January	(Monaco) 58th Rallye Automobile Monte-Carlo	Monte Carlo	Mixed	28	604.63 km	Drivers & Manufacturers
C	10 February	12 February	(Sweden) International Swedish Rally	Karlstad, Värmland County	Snow	??	523.12 km	Drivers only
2	6 March	10 March	24th Rallye de Portugal - Vinho do Porto	Estoril, Lisbon	Mixed	39	556.10 km	Drivers & Manufacturers
3	11 April	16 April	(Kenya) 38th Marlboro Safari Rally	Nairobi	Gravel	N/A	4131.40 km	Drivers & Manufacturers
4	6 May	9 May	34th Tour de Corse - Rallye de France	Ajaccio, Corsica	Tarmac	30	602.25 km	Drivers & Manufacturers
5	3 June	6 June	(Greece) 37th Acropolis Rally	Athens	Gravel	48	622.98 km	Drivers & Manufacturers
6	30 June	3 July	21st Rothmans Rally of New Zealand	Manukau, Auckland	Gravel	43	599.49 km	Drivers only
7	24 July	28 July	10th Rally Argentina	Buenos Aires	Gravel	30	599.42 km	Drivers & Manufacturers
8	23 August	26 August	(Finland) 40th 1000 Lakes Rally	Jyväskylä, Central Finland	Gravel	42	527.61 km	Drivers & Manufacturers
9	20 September	23 September	3rd Commonwealth Bank Rally Australia	Perth, Western Australia	Gravel	35	570.28 km	Drivers & Manufacturers
10	14 October	18 October	(Italy) 32nd Rallye Sanremo - Rallye d'Italia	Sanremo, Liguria	Mixed	35	614.95 km	Drivers & Manufacturers
11	28 October	1 November	(Ivory Coast) 22nd Rallye Cote d'Ivoire	Abidjan	Gravel	N/A	3088 km	Drivers only
12	25 November	28 November	(United Kingdom) 46th Lombard RAC Rally	Harrogate, North Yorkshire	Gravel	41	566.27 km	Drivers & Manufacturers

Swedish Rally was cancelled due to warm weather and lack of snow.

== Teams and drivers ==
=== Group A major entries ===
Team	Manufacturer	Car	Tyre	Drivers	Co-drivers	Rounds
(Italy) Martini Lancia	Lancia	Delta Integrale 16V	M	(Finland) Juha Kankkunen	(Finland) Juha Piironen	1–3, 5, 7, 10, 12
(Italy) Martini Lancia	Lancia	Delta Integrale 16V	M	(Italy) Miki Biasion	(Italy) Tiziano Siviero	1–3, 5, 7–10, 12
(Italy) Martini Lancia	Lancia	Delta Integrale 16V	M	(France) Didier Auriol	(France) Bernard Occelli	1–2, 4–5, 7–10
(Italy) Martini Lancia	Lancia	Delta Integrale 16V	M	(Italy) Alessandro Fiorio	(Italy) Luigi Pirollo	3, 9
(Italy) Martini Lancia	Lancia	Delta Integrale 16V	M	(France) Yves Loubet	(France) Jean-Paul Chiaroni	4
(Italy) Jolly Club	Lancia	Delta Integrale 16V	M	(Italy) Dario Cerrato	(Italy) Giuseppe Cerri	1–2, 10
(Italy) Jolly Club	Lancia	Delta Integrale 16V	M	(Italy) Alessandro Fiorio	(Italy) Luigi Pirollo	5, 8, 10
(Italy) Jolly Club	Lancia	Delta Integrale 16V	M	(France) Didier Auriol	(France) Bernard Occelli	12
(Italy) Jolly Club	Lancia	Delta Integrale 16V	M	(Belgium) Robert Droogmans	(Belgium) Ronny Joosten	12
(Italy) Lancia Fina	Lancia	Delta Integrale 16V	M	(France) Bruno Saby	(France) Daniel Grataloup	1, 4
(Portugal) Duriforte SG Gigante	Lancia	Delta Integrale 16V	M	(Portugal) Carlos Bica	(Portugal) Fernando Prata	2
(Germany) Lancia Deutschland	Lancia	Delta Integrale 16V	M	(Germany) Ronald Holzer	(Germany) Klaus Wendel	2, 5
(Italy) Michele Rayneri	Lancia	Delta Integrale 16V	D	(Italy) Michele Rayneri	(Italy) Loris Roggia	5–6, 9
(Greece) "Jigger"	Lancia	Delta Integrale 16V	B	(Greece) "Jigger"	(Greece) Konstantinos Stefanis	5
(Italy) Paola De Martini	Lancia	Delta Integrale 16V	?	(Italy) Paola De Martini	(Italy) Umberta Gibellini	7
(Sweden) Clarion Team Europe	Lancia	Delta Integrale 16V	M	(Sweden) Per Eklund	(Sweden) Jan-Olof Bohlin	8, 12
Team Michelin Finland	Lancia	Delta Integrale 16V	M	(Finland) Sebastian Lindholm	(Finland) Timo Hantunen	8
(Italy) H.F. Grifone SRL	Lancia	Delta Integrale 16V	M	(Italy) Piero Liatti	(Italy) Luciano Tedeschini	10
(Italy) Astra Racing	Lancia	Delta Integrale 16V	?	(Italy) Piergiorgio Deila	(Italy) Pierangelo Scalvini	10
(Italy) Città di Castelfranco	Lancia	Delta Integrale 16V	?	(Italy) Pucci Giuseppe Grossi	(Italy) Alessandro Mari	10
(Japan) Toyota Team Europe	Toyota	Celica GT-4 (ST165)	P	(Spain) Carlos Sainz	(Spain) Luis Moya	1–10, 12
(Japan) Toyota Team Europe	Toyota	Celica GT-4 (ST165)	P	(Sweden) Mikael Ericsson	(Sweden) Claes Billstam	1, 3, 5, 8–10
(Japan) Toyota Team Europe	Toyota	Celica GT-4 (ST165)	P	(Germany) Armin Schwarz	(Germany) Klaus Wicha	1–2, 4, 10, 12
Toyota Team Kenya	Toyota	Celica GT-4 (ST165)	P	(Sweden) Björn Waldegård	(United Kingdom) Fred Gallagher	3
(United Arab Emirates) Toyota Team Middle East	Toyota	Celica GT-4 (ST165)	P	(United Arab Emirates) Mohammed Ben Sulayem	(Republic of Ireland) Ronan Morgan	5
(Argentina) Recalde Alpitour	Toyota	Celica GT-4 (ST165)	P	(Argentina) Jorge Recalde	(Argentina) Martin Christie	7
(France) Jean-Michel Dionneau	Toyota	Celica GT-4 (ST165)	?	(France) Jean-Michel Dionneau	(France) Thierry Brion	11
Toyota Team Sweden	Toyota	Celica GT-4 (ST165)	P	(Sweden) Mats Jonsson	(Sweden) Anders Olsson	12
(United Kingdom) Toyota Team Great Britain	Toyota	Celica GT-4 (ST165)	P	(United Kingdom) David Llewellin	(United Kingdom) Phil Short	12
(France) Patrice Servant	Toyota	Corolla 16V	?	(France) Patrice Servant	(France) David Charbonnel	11
(France) Michel Molinié	Toyota	Corolla 16V	?	(France) Michel Molinié	(France) Patrice Lemarie	11
(France) Jean-Philippe Bernier	Toyota	Corolla 16V	?	(France) Jean-Philippe Bernier	(France) Yves Malus	11
(France) Adolphe Choteau	Toyota	Corolla 16V	?	(France) Adolphe Choteau	(France) Jean-Pierre Claverie	11
(Japan) Mazda Rally Team Europe	Mazda	323 4WD	M	(Finland) Timo Salonen	(Finland) Voitto Silander	1–2
(Japan) Mazda Rally Team Europe	Mazda	323 GTX	M	(Finland) Timo Salonen	(Finland) Voitto Silander	8, 12
(Japan) Mazda Rally Team Europe	Mazda	323 4WD	M	(Finland) Hannu Mikkola	(Sweden) Arne Hertz	1–2
(Japan) Mazda Rally Team Europe	Mazda	323 GTX	M	(Finland) Hannu Mikkola	(Sweden) Arne Hertz	8, 12
(Japan) Mazda Rally Team Europe	Mazda	323 4WD	M	(Belgium) Grégoire de Mevius	(Belgium) Luc Manset	2
(Japan) Mazda Rally Team Europe	Mazda	323 4WD	M	(Belgium) Grégoire de Mevius	(Sweden) Arne Hertz	9
(Japan) Mazda Rally Team Europe	Mazda	323 GTX	M	(Finland) Mikael Sundström	(Finland) Juha Repo	8, 12
(Japan) Mazda Rally Team Europe	Mazda	323 4WD	M	(Sweden) Ingvar Carlsson	(Sweden) Per Carlsson	6, 9
(New Zealand) Mazda Rally Team Asia Pacific	Mazda	323 4WD	?	(New Zealand) Rod Millen	(New Zealand) Tony Sircombe	6, 9
(Japan) Mitsubishi Ralliart	Mitsubishi	Galant VR-4	M	(Sweden) Kenneth Eriksson	(Sweden) Staffan Parmander	1–2, 5, 8–9, 12
(Japan) Mitsubishi Ralliart	Mitsubishi	Galant VR-4	M	(Finland) Ari Vatanen	(Sweden) Bruno Berglund	1–2, 5, 8, 12
(Japan) Mitsubishi Oil Citizen	Mitsubishi	Galant VR-4	Y	(Japan) Kenjiro Shinozuka	(United Kingdom) John Meadows	3, 11
(Japan) Mitsubishi Oil Citizen	Mitsubishi	Galant VR-4	Y	(Australia) Ross Dunkerton	(Lithuania) Fred Gocentas	6
(Japan) Mitsubishi Oil Citizen	Mitsubishi	Galant VR-4	Y	(Australia) Ross Dunkerton	(Australia) Steve McKimmie	9
Mitsubishi Ralliart Finland	Mitsubishi	Galant VR-4	M	(Finland) Lasse Lampi	(Finland) Pentti Kuukkala	8
(France) Patrick Tauziac	Mitsubishi	Galant VR-4	?	(France) Patrick Tauziac	(France) Claude Papin	11
(Germany) Audi Sport Europa Team	Audi	90 Quattro	M	(Italy) Paola De Martini	(Italy) Umberta Gibellini	1–2, 4–5, 8–10
(Austria) Stohl Racing	Audi	90 Quattro	M	(Austria) Rudolf Stohl	(Austria) Reinhard Kaufmann	3, 7
(Austria) Stohl Racing	Audi	90 Quattro	M	(Austria) Rudolf Stohl	(Austria) Ernst Rohringer	5, 11
(Finland) VV-Auto	Audi	90 Quattro	?	(Finland) Esa Saarenpää	(Finland) Olli Männistö	8
(Finland) VV-Auto	Audi	200 Quattro	?	(Finland) Risto Buri	(Finland) Jyrki Stenroos	8
(United Kingdom) GM Euro Sport	GM	Kadett GSI 16V	M	(United Kingdom) Louise Aitken-Walker	(Sweden) Christina Thörner	1, 10, 12
(United Kingdom) GM Euro Sport	GM	Astra GTE	M	(United Kingdom) Louise Aitken-Walker	(Sweden) Christina Thörner	2, 4, 6, 9
(United Kingdom) Vauxhall Dealer Sport	GM	Nova GTE	M	(United Kingdom) David Metcalfe	(United Kingdom) Ian Grindrod	12
Concessionnaires Peugeot France	Peugeot	309 GTI	M	(France) François Delecour	(Monaco) "Tilber"	1, 4
Concessionnaires Peugeot France	Peugeot	205 Rallye	M	(France) Fabien Doenlen	(France) Evelyne Merciol	4
(United Kingdom) Peugeot Talbot Sport	Peugeot	205 GTI 1.6	M	(United Kingdom) Paul Frankland	(United Kingdom) Keith Chipcase	12
(United Kingdom) Peugeot Talbot Sport	Peugeot	309 GTI	M	(United Kingdom) Richard Burns	(United Kingdom) Wayne Goble	12
(Portugal) Diabolique Motorsport	Ford	Sierra RS Cosworth	M	(Portugal) Joaquim Santos	(Portugal) Miguel Oliveira	2
(Belgium) Ford Fina Rally Team	Ford	Sierra RS Cosworth	D	(Belgium) Marc Duez	(Belgium) Alain Lopes	2, 4
(Belgium) Ford Fina Rally Team	Ford	Sierra RS Cosworth 4x4	D	(Belgium) Marc Duez	(Belgium) Alain Lopes	10, 12
(United Kingdom) Q8 Team Ford	Ford	Sierra RS Cosworth 4x4	P	(Finland) Pentti Airikkala	(Republic of Ireland) Ronan McNamee	8, 10, 12
(United Kingdom) Q8 Team Ford	Ford	Sierra RS Cosworth 4x4	P	(United Kingdom) Malcolm Wilson	(United Kingdom) Nicky Grist	8, 10, 12
(United Kingdom) Q8 Team Ford	Ford	Sierra RS Cosworth 4x4	P	(Italy) Gianfranco Cunico	(Italy) Stefano Evangelisti	8, 10
(United Kingdom) Q8 Team Ford	Ford	Sierra RS Cosworth 4x4	P	(Italy) Alessandro Fiorio	(Italy) Luigi Pirollo	12
(United Kingdom) Shell Oil UK	Ford	Sierra RS Cosworth 4x4	P	(United Kingdom) Jimmy McRae	(United Kingdom) David Senior	12
(United Kingdom) Shell Oil UK	Ford	Sierra RS Cosworth 4x4	P	(United Kingdom) Colin McRae	(United Kingdom) Derek Ringer	12
(Japan) Subaru Technica International	Subaru	Legacy RS	M	(Finland) Markku Alén	(Finland) Ilkka Kivimäki	3, 5, 8, 10, 12
(Japan) Subaru Technica International	Subaru	Legacy RS	M	(New Zealand) Peter 'Possum' Bourne	(New Zealand) Rodger Freeth	3, 6, 9
(Japan) Subaru Technica International	Subaru	Legacy RS	M	(Kenya) Mike Kirkland	(Kenya) Surinder Thatthi	3, 6
(Japan) Subaru Technica International	Subaru	Legacy RS	M	(Kenya) Jim Heather-Hayes	(Kenya) Anton Levitan	3
(Japan) Subaru Technica International	Subaru	Legacy RS	M	(Kenya) Ian Duncan	(Kenya) Ian Munro	3
(Japan) Subaru Technica International	Subaru	Legacy RS	M	(France) François Chatriot	(France) Michel Périn	10
(Japan) Subaru Technica International	Subaru	Legacy RS	M	(United Kingdom) Derek Warwick	(Republic of Ireland) Ronan Morgan	12
(Austria) Vredestein Rally Team	Volkswagen	Golf II GTi 16V	M	(Austria) Raimund Baumschlager	(Austria) Ruben Zeltner	2, 4
(Germany) Volkswagen Motorsport	Volkswagen	Golf G60 Rallye	P	(Germany) Erwin Weber	(Germany) Matthias Feltz	5–6, 9
(Kenya) Ryce Motors Ltd.	Daihatsu	Charade	D	(Kenya) Ashok Pattni	(Kenya) Bob Khan	3
(Kenya) Ryce Motors Ltd.	Daihatsu	Charade	D	(Kenya) Steve Anthony	(Kenya) Philip Valentine	3
(Kenya) Ryce Motors Ltd.	Daihatsu	Charade	D	(Japan) Takeshi Hirabayashi	(Kenya) Thee Soin	3
(Kenya) Ryce Motors Ltd.	Daihatsu	Charade	D	(Kenya) Guy Jack	(Kenya) Dave Smith	3
(France) Bastos Motul BMW	BMW	M3 E30	P	(France) François Chatriot	(France) Michel Périn	4
(France) Citroën Sport	Citroën	AX Sport	M	(France) Christine Driano	(France) Marie-Christine Lallement	4
(France) Citroën Sport	Citroën	AX Sport	M	(France) Laurent Poggi	(France) Edouard Buresi	4
(Greece) N.I. Theocharakis	Nissan	200SX	?	(Greece) Pavlos Moschoutis	(Greece) Efthimios Sassalos	5
(France) Alain Ambrosino	Nissan	March Super Turbo	?	(France) Alain Ambrosino	(France) Daniel Le Saux	11
(Soviet Union) RSFSR	Lada	Samara 21083	?	(Soviet Union) Vladislav Shtykov	(Soviet Union) Yuriy Baykov	5, 8
(Soviet Union) RSFSR	Lada	Samara 21083	?	(Soviet Union) Sergey Alyasov	(Soviet Union) Aleksandr Levitan	5
(Czech Republic) Škoda Motorsport	Škoda	Favorit 136 L	M	(Czech Republic) Ladislav Křeček	(Czech Republic) Bořivoj Motl	5, 10
(Czech Republic) Škoda Motorsport	Škoda	Favorit 136 L	M	(Czech Republic) Pavel Sibera	(Czech Republic) Petr Gross	5, 8, 12
(Czech Republic) Škoda Motorsport	Škoda	Favorit 136 L	M	(Finland) Kalevi Aho	(Finland) Timo Hakala	8, 10
(United Kingdom) Škoda GB	Škoda	Favorit 136 L	?	(Norway) John Haugland	(Norway) Petter Vegel	12
(Argentina) Marcelo Raies	Renault	18 GTX	?	(Argentina) Marcelo Raies	(Argentina) Jorge Gonzalez	7
(Argentina) Oscar Maccari	Renault	18 GTX	?	(Argentina) Oscar Maccari	(Argentina) Carlos Ostaschinsky	7
(Argentina) Gabriel Martin	Fiat	Regatta 85	?	(Argentina) Gabriel Martin	(Argentina) José Maria Volta	7
(Argentina) Fernando Marino	Fiat	Regatta 85	?	(Argentina) Fernando Marino	(Argentina) Rodolfo Ghilini	7

=== FIA Group N Cup major entries ===
Team	Manufacturer	Car	Tyre	Drivers	Co-drivers	Rounds
(France) Simon Racing	Renault	5 GT Turbo	M	(France) Alain Oreille	(France) Michel Roissard	1–2, 4–7, 9–11
(France) Team Diac	Renault	5 GT Turbo	M	(France) Jean Ragnotti	(France) Gilles Thimonier	4
(France) Team Diac	Renault	5 GT Turbo	M	(France) Claude Balesi	(France) Jean-Paul Cirindini	4
(France) Team Diac	Renault	5 GT Turbo	M	(France) Sylvain Polo	(France) Hervé Sauvage	4
(France) Bertrand Balas	Lancia	Delta Integrale 16V	M	(France) Bertrand Balas	(France) Eric Lainé	1
(Italy) Top Run	Lancia	Delta Integrale 16V	M	(Argentina) Jorge Recalde	(Argentina) Martin Christie	2, 5–6, 8–9
(Italy) Astra Racing	Lancia	Delta Integrale 16V	M	(Uruguay) Gustavo Trelles	(Uruguay) Daniel Muzio	2, 5–12
(Italy) Astra Racing	Lancia	Delta Integrale 16V	M	(Argentina) Ernesto Soto	(Argentina) Jorge del Buono	2, 5–9
(United Kingdom) Walkers Radiators	Lancia	Delta Integrale 16V	?	(United Kingdom) Steve Smith	(United Kingdom) Brian Hughes	12
(Monaco) Pierre-Manuel Jenot	Alfa Romeo	Alfa Romeo 75 Turbo	?	(Monaco) Pierre-Manuel Jenot	(France) "Slo"	1
Alfa Romeo France	Alfa Romeo	Alfa Romeo 75 Turbo	P	(France) Laurent Albertini	(France) Ange Pasquali	4
(Kenya) Serena Hotels	Subaru	Legacy RS	B	(Kenya) Patrick Njiru	(Kenya) David Williamson	3
(Kenya) Ian Duncan	Subaru	Legacy RS	M	(Kenya) Ian Duncan	(Kenya) Yvonne Mehta	5
(Italy) Toyota Team Italia	Toyota	Celica GT-4 (ST165)	P	(Italy) Gilberto Pianezzola	(Italy) Lucio Baggio	3, 5–6, 9–10
(Cameroon) Viviane Evina	Toyota	Corolla FX-16V	?	(Cameroon) Viviane Evina	(France) Nathalie Chastagnol	11
(Finland) Pro Sport Rally Team	Mitsubishi	Galant VR-4	M	(Finland) Tommi Mäkinen	(Finland) Seppo Harjanne	6, 8–10, 12
(Japan) Team Mitsubishi-Ralliart	Mitsubishi	Galant VR-4	?	(Japan) Kiyoshi Inoue	(Japan) Satoshi Hayashi	6, 9
(Australia) Pedders Suspension	Mitsubishi	Galant VR-4	B	(Australia) Ed Ordynski	(Australia) Jeremy Browne	9
(United Kingdom) Q8 Team Ford	Ford	Sierra RS Cosworth 4x4	P	(United Kingdom) Gwyndaf Evans	(United Kingdom) Howard Davies	8, 10, 12
(Italy) Ford Italia	Ford	Sierra RS Cosworth 4x4	?	(Italy) Alessandro Fassina	(Italy) Massimo Chiapponi	10
(Italy) Rally Team Italia	Mazda	323 GTX	M	(Belgium) Grégoire de Mevius	(Belgium) Willy Lux	10
(United Kingdom) Team Daihatsu	Daihatsu	Charade GTi	D	(United Kingdom) Terry Kaby	(United Kingdom) Kevin Gormley	12

== Events ==
1990 World Rally Championship event map
Black = Tarmac	Brown = Gravel	Blue = Snow/Ice	Red = Mixed Surface

1990 World Rally Championship schedule and results
Round	Rally name		Podium finishers				
Round	Rally name	Rank	Driver	Co Driver	Team	Car	Time
1	(Monaco) Rallye Monte Carlo (19–25 January)	1	(France) Didier Auriol	(France) Bernard Occelli	(Italy) Martini Lancia	Lancia Delta Integrale 16V	5:56:52
1	(Monaco) Rallye Monte Carlo (19–25 January)	2	(Spain) Carlos Sainz	(Spain) Luis Moya	(Japan) Toyota Team Europe	Toyota Celica GT-Four ST165	5:57:44
1	(Monaco) Rallye Monte Carlo (19–25 January)	3	(Italy) Miki Biasion	(Italy) Tiziano Siviero	(Italy) Martini Lancia	Lancia Delta Integrale 16V	6:00:31
2	Rallye de Portugal (6–10 March)	1	(Italy) Miki Biasion	(Italy) Tiziano Siviero	(Italy) Martini Lancia	Lancia Delta Integrale 16V	6:17:57
2	Rallye de Portugal (6–10 March)	2	(France) Didier Auriol	(France) Bernard Occelli	(Italy) Martini Lancia	Lancia Delta Integrale 16V	6:20:33
2	Rallye de Portugal (6–10 March)	3	(Finland) Juha Kankkunen	(Finland) Juha Piironen	(Italy) Martini Lancia	Lancia Delta Integrale 16V	6:23:08
3	(Kenya) Safari Rally (11–16 April)	1	(Sweden) Björn Waldegård	(United Kingdom) Fred Gallagher	(Japan) Toyota Team Europe	Toyota Celica GT-Four ST165	8:39:11
3	(Kenya) Safari Rally (11–16 April)	2	(Finland) Juha Kankkunen	(Finland) Juha Piironen	(Italy) Martini Lancia	Lancia Delta Integrale 16V	9:17:23
3	(Kenya) Safari Rally (11–16 April)	3	(Sweden) Mikael Ericsson	(Sweden) Claes Billstam	(Japan) Toyota Team Europe	Toyota Celica GT-Four ST165	11:26:58
4	(France) Tour de Corse (6–9 May)	1	(France) Didier Auriol	(France) Bernard Occelli	(Italy) Martini Lancia	Lancia Delta Integrale 16V	6:45:16
4	(France) Tour de Corse (6–9 May)	2	(Spain) Carlos Sainz	(Spain) Luis Moya	(Japan) Toyota Team Europe	Toyota Celica GT-Four ST165	6:45:52
4	(France) Tour de Corse (6–9 May)	3	(France) François Chatriot	(France) Michel Périn	(France) Bastos Motul BMW	BMW M3	6:49:05
5	(Greece) Acropolis Rally (3–6 June)	1	(Spain) Carlos Sainz	(Spain) Luis Moya	(Japan) Toyota Team Europe	Toyota Celica GT-Four ST165	7:34:44
5	(Greece) Acropolis Rally (3–6 June)	2	(Finland) Juha Kankkunen	(Finland) Juha Piironen	(Italy) Martini Lancia	Lancia Delta Integrale 16V	7:35:30
5	(Greece) Acropolis Rally (3–6 June)	3	(Italy) Miki Biasion	(Italy) Tiziano Siviero	(Italy) Martini Lancia	Lancia Delta Integrale 16V	7:37:42
6	Rally New Zealand (30 June – 3 July)	1	(Spain) Carlos Sainz	(Spain) Luis Moya	(Japan) Toyota Team Europe	Toyota Celica GT-Four ST165	6:48:26
6	Rally New Zealand (30 June – 3 July)	2	(Sweden) Ingvar Carlsson	(Sweden) Per Carlsson	(Japan) Mazda Rally Team Europe	Mazda 323 4WD	6:49:57
6	Rally New Zealand (30 June – 3 July)	3	(West Germany) Erwin Weber	(West Germany) Matthias Feltz	(West Germany) Volkswagen Motorsport	Volkswagen Golf Rallye G60	6:56:24
7	Rally Argentina (24–28 July)	1	(Italy) Miki Biasion	(Italy) Tiziano Siviero	(Italy) Martini Lancia	Lancia Delta Integrale 16V	6:51:27
7	Rally Argentina (24–28 July)	2	(Spain) Carlos Sainz	(Spain) Luis Moya	(Japan) Toyota Team Europe	Toyota Celica GT-Four ST165	6:59:29
7	Rally Argentina (24–28 July)	3	(France) Didier Auriol	(France) Bernard Occelli	(Italy) Martini Lancia	Lancia Delta Integrale 16V	7:26:22
8	(Finland) 1000 Lakes Rally (23–26 August)	1	(Spain) Carlos Sainz	(Spain) Luis Moya	(Japan) Toyota Team Europe	Toyota Celica GT-Four ST165	4:40:55
8	(Finland) 1000 Lakes Rally (23–26 August)	2	(Finland) Ari Vatanen	(Sweden) Bruno Berglund	(Japan) Mitsubishi Ralliart Europe	Mitsubishi Galant VR-4	4:41:14
8	(Finland) 1000 Lakes Rally (23–26 August)	3	(Sweden) Kenneth Eriksson	(Sweden) Staffan Parmander	(Japan) Mitsubishi Ralliart Europe	Mitsubishi Galant VR-4	4:45:53
9	Rally Australia (20–23 September)	1	(Finland) Juha Kankkunen	(Finland) Juha Piironen	(Italy) Martini Lancia	Lancia Delta Integrale 16V	5:43:48
9	Rally Australia (20–23 September)	2	(Spain) Carlos Sainz	(Spain) Luis Moya	(Japan) Toyota Team Europe	Toyota Celica GT-Four ST165	5:45:28
9	Rally Australia (20–23 September)	3	(Italy) Alex Fiorio	(Italy) Luigi Pirollo	(Italy) Martini Lancia	Lancia Delta Integrale 16V	5:49:28
10	(Italy) Rallye Sanremo (14–18 October)	1	(France) Didier Auriol	(France) Bernard Occelli	(Italy) Martini Lancia	Lancia Delta Integrale 16V	7:30:38
10	(Italy) Rallye Sanremo (14–18 October)	2	(Finland) Juha Kankkunen	(Finland) Juha Piironen	(Italy) Martini Lancia	Lancia Delta Integrale 16V	7:31:23
10	(Italy) Rallye Sanremo (14–18 October)	3	(Spain) Carlos Sainz	(Spain) Luis Moya	(Japan) Toyota Team Europe	Toyota Celica GT-Four ST165	7:32:23
11	(Ivory Coast) Rallye Côte d'Ivoire (28 October – 1 November)	1	(France) Patrick Tauziac	(France) Claude Papin	(Japan) Mitsubishi Ralliart Europe	Mitsubishi Galant VR-4	4:54:00
11	(Ivory Coast) Rallye Côte d'Ivoire (28 October – 1 November)	2	(Austria) Rudi Stohl	(Austria) Ernst Röhringer	(Germany) Audi Sport	Audi 90 Quattro	5:56:00
11	(Ivory Coast) Rallye Côte d'Ivoire (28 October – 1 November)	3	(France) Alain Oreille	(France) Michel Roissard	(France) Simon Racing	Renault 5 GT Turbo	6:52:00
12	(United Kingdom) Rally GB (25–28 November)	1	(Spain) Carlos Sainz	(Spain) Luis Moya	(Japan) Toyota Team Europe	Toyota Celica GT-Four ST165	5:43:16
12	(United Kingdom) Rally GB (25–28 November)	2	(Sweden) Kenneth Eriksson	(Sweden) Staffan Parmander	(Japan) Mitsubishi Ralliart Europe	Mitsubishi Galant VR-4	5:44:58
12	(United Kingdom) Rally GB (25–28 November)	3	(Italy) Miki Biasion	(Italy) Tiziano Siviero	(Italy) Martini Lancia	Lancia Delta Integrale 16V	5:47:22

== Results ==
=== Driver championship ===
Pos.	Driver	MON (Monaco)	POR (Portugal)	KEN (Kenya)	COR (France)	GRC (Greece)	NZL (New Zealand)	ARG (Argentina)	FIN (Finland)	AUS (Australia)	SRM (Italy)	IVC (Ivory Coast)	GBR (United Kingdom)	Points
1	(Spain) Carlos Sainz	2	Ret	4	2	1	1	2	1	2	3		1	140
2	(France) Didier Auriol	1	2		1	Ret		3	Ret	Ret	1		5	95
3	(Finland) Juha Kankkunen	Ret	3	2		2		Ret	5	1	2		Ret	85
4	(Italy) Miki Biasion	3	1	Ret		3		1			Ret		3	76
5	(Sweden) Mikael Ericsson	7		3		4			Ret	Ret	6			32
6	(Italy) Dario Cerrato	4	4								4			30
7	(Austria) Rudi Stohl			7		Ret		4				2		29
8	(Sweden) Kenneth Eriksson	Ret	Ret			Ret			3	Ret			2	27
9	(Italy) Alex Fiorio			Ret		5			Ret	3	8		9	25
10	(Sweden) Ingvar Carlsson						2			5				23
11	(France) Alain Oreille	13	14		8	13	10	6		Ret	17	3		22
12	(Sweden) Björn Waldegård			1										20
13	(France) Patrick Tauziac											1		20
14	(New Zealand) Peter 'Possum' Bourne			Ret			5			4				18
15	(France) Bruno Saby	6			4									16
16	(Finland) Ari Vatanen	Ret	Ret			Ret			2				Ret	15
17	(France) François Chatriot				3						Ret			12
18	(Germany) Erwin Weber					Ret	3			DSQ				12
19	(Germany) Armin Schwarz	5	Ret		Ret						Ret		7	12
20	(Australia) Ross Dunkerton						4			Ret				10
21	(Finland) Markku Alén			Ret		Ret			4		Ret		Ret	10
22	(France) Alain Ambrosino											4		10
23	(Sweden) Mats Jonsson												4	10
24	(Finland) Tommi Mäkinen						6		11	7	13		Ret	10
25	(Finland) Timo Salonen	8	Ret						6				Ret	9
26	(Uruguay) Gustavo Trelles		11			9	7	Ret	15	8	15	Ret	Ret	9
27	(Portugal) Carlos Bica		5											8
28	(Japan) Kenjiro Shinozuka			5								Ret		8
29	(Austria) Raimund Baumschlager				5									8
30	(Argentina) Ernesto Soto		12				Ret	5	16					8
31	(Italy) Piero Liatti										5			8
32	(France) Patrice Servant											5		8
33	(Argentina) Jorge Recalde		7			Ret	8	Ret	22	11				7
34	(Finland) Hannu Mikkola	Ret	6						Ret				Ret	6
35	(Kenya) Jim Heather-Hayes			6										6
36	(France) Laurent Poggi				6									6
37	(Italy) Michele Rayneri					6	Ret							6
38	(Belgium) Grégoire de Mevius		Ret							6	Ret			6
39	(Ivory Coast) Michel Molinie											6		6
40	(United Kingdom) Colin McRae												6	6
41	(France) Claude Balesi				7									4
42	(Greece) Giannis Vardinogiannis					7								4
43	(Argentina) Marcelo Raies							7						4
44	(Finland) Lasse Lampi								7					4
45	(Italy) Piergiorgio Deila										7			4
46	(France) Jean-Philippe Bernier											7		4
47	(Belgium) Marc Duez		8		Ret									3
48	(Kenya) Patrick Njiru			8										3
49	(Kenya) Ian Duncan			Ret		8								3
50	(Argentina) Gabriel Martin							8						3
51	(Finland) Sebastian Lindholm								8					3
52	(Cameroon) Viviane Evina											8		3
53	(United Kingdom) David Llewellin												8	3
54	(Italy) Paola de Martini	Ret	16		9	Ret		WD	32	Ret	Ret			2
55	(France) François Delecour	9			Ret									2
56	(Portugal) Joaquim Santos		9											2
57	(Kenya) Ashok Pattni			9										2
58	(Italy) Gilberto Pianezzola		13				9							2
59	(Argentina) Oscar Maccari							9						2
60	(Finland) Esa Saarenpää								9					2
61	(Japan) Kiyoshi Inoue									9				2
62	(Italy) Giuseppe Grossi										9			2
63	(France) Jean-Michel Dionneau											9		2
64	(France) Bertrand Balas	10												1
65	(Germany) Ronald Holzer		10											1
66	(Kenya) Steve Anthony			10										1
67	(France) Sylvain Polo				10									1
68	(Greece) Pavlos Moschoutis					10								1
69	(Argentina) Fernando Marino							10						1
70	(Finland) Risto Buri								10					1
71	(Australia) Ed Ordynski									10				1
72	(Italy) Alessandro Fassina										10			1
73	(Ivory Coast) Adolphe Choteau											10		1
74	(Belgium) Robert Droogmans												10	1
Pos.	Driver	MON (Monaco)	POR (Portugal)	KEN (Kenya)	COR (France)	GRC (Greece)	NZL (New Zealand)	ARG (Argentina)	FIN (Finland)	AUS (Australia)	SRM (Italy)	IVC (Ivory Coast)	GBR (United Kingdom)	Points

Key
Colour	Result
Gold	Winner
Silver	2nd place
Bronze	3rd place
Green	Points finish
Blue	Non-points finish
Blue	Non-classified finish (NC)
Purple	Did not finish (Ret)
Black	Excluded (EX)
Black	Disqualified (DSQ)
White	Did not start (DNS)
White	Cancelled (C)
Blank	Withdrew entry from the event (WD)

=== Manufacturer championship ===
Pos.	Manufacturer	MON (Monaco)	POR (Portugal)	KEN (Kenya)	COR (France)	GRC (Greece)	ARG (Argentina)	FIN (Finland)	AUS (Australia)	SRM (Italy)	GBR (United Kingdom)	Points
1	(Italy) Lancia	1	1	2	1	2	1	5	1	1	3	137
2	(Japan) Toyota	2		1	2	1	2	1	2	3	1	131
3	(Japan) Mitsubishi			5				2	7		2	56
4	(Japan) Subaru			6		8		4	4			43
5	(Japan) Mazda	8	6					6	5			30
6	(France) Renault				7		6					24
7	(Germany) Audi			7	9		4	9				24
8	(United Kingdom) Ford		8							9	6	22
9	(Germany) BMW				3							14
10	(Germany) Volkswagen				5							10
11	(France) Citroën				6							8
12	Renault Argentina						7					8
13	Fiat Argentina						8					6
14	(Japan) Daihatsu			9								3
15	(France) Peugeot	9										2
16	(Japan) Nissan					10						2
Pos.	Manufacturer	MON (Monaco)	POR (Portugal)	KEN (Kenya)	COR (France)	GRC (Greece)	ARG (Argentina)	FIN (Finland)	AUS (Australia)	SRM (Italy)	GBR (United Kingdom)	Points
