= The Under 17 Car Club =

The Under 17 Car Club is a club where people under the age of 17 can drive motor vehicles. It was started in 1976 by author Sandy Barrie who realised there was no opportunity for youngsters under seventeen to drive cars. The Club is run entirely by volunteers with no full or part-time paid staff.

The aim of the club is "to enable under age drivers to practice and improve their driving skills legally and safely, in a variety of different vehicles, under properly supervised conditions, and to take an active interest in cars and motor sport and ultimately to produce safer young drivers on our roads at age 17 and beyond".

== Grading system ==
The club has a grading system, designed to help members progress to driving test standard.

- Ungraded - On first joining you are ungraded
- Grade 5 - After taking a skills test and passing you become grade 5 and can go forwards and backwards competently
- Grade 4 - You have mastered manoeuvres and roundabouts
- Grade 3 - Your driving is smooth and safe and you have good car control
- Grade 2 - Your driving shows finesse, you can drive a car at motorway speeds safely and are at the driving test standard
- Grade 1 - You are competent at all aspects of motoring including mechanics
- Grade X - You show outstanding skill at driving and are an exceptionally safe driver

== Activities ==
The club offers many activities at different venues, including:

- Skill Tests
- Skid Pans
- Advanced Driving
- Truck Day
- Magic Day - where they raise money for the Teenage Cancer Trust. The Club has so far raised over £100,000 for TCT.
- Motorway Driving
- Speed Awareness
- Peer Pressure / Distracted Driving
- Team Challenge
- Caterham Day
- 4x4 Day

== Meeting places ==
The Club use a variety of venues throughout the year to provide the best possible range of driving experience to Members. The number of events at each site is subject to availability. The locations of the current venues are below:

- Castle Combe Circuit
- Bovington Tank Proving Ground
- Kempton Park Racecourse
- MOD Lyneham
- Fire Service College, Moreton-in-Marsh
- Saffron Walden (Debden)
- Three Counties Showground, Malvern
- Seighford, Staffordshire
- Science and Technology Park in Berkeley Gloucestershire

== Well known members ==
One of the most famous members of the club was Richard Burns, who joined the club in 1982, and went on to become the first Englishman to win the World Rally Championship in 2001. Burns was patron of the club until his death in 2005.
