= Jacques Tasso =

French rally racer (1944–2024)

- Born: 31 March 1944
- Died: 1 March 2024 (aged 79)
- Occupation: Rally racer

Jacques Tasso (31 March 1944 – 1 March 2024) was a French rally racer.

== Biography ==
Born on 31 March 1944, Tasso began his competitive career in the 1970s with a Renault 8 Gordini before moving on to the Simca 1000 Rallye and the Opel Kadett KT/E. For most of his career, he raced Fords with Group N. He was co-champion in the French 2nd division in 1988 and 1989, twice winning the Rallye des Monts Dôme in a Ford Sierra. He also won the Rallye Ain-Jura in 1991 and 1992.

After a cancelled 1992 season due to lack of budget, Tasso returned in 1993 in a Ford Escort and again won the 2nd division, including a victory at the Rallye du Forez. He then retired in the mid-2000s.

Jacques Tasso died on 1 March 2024, at the age of 79.
