= Piero Liatti =

Italian rally driver (born 1962)

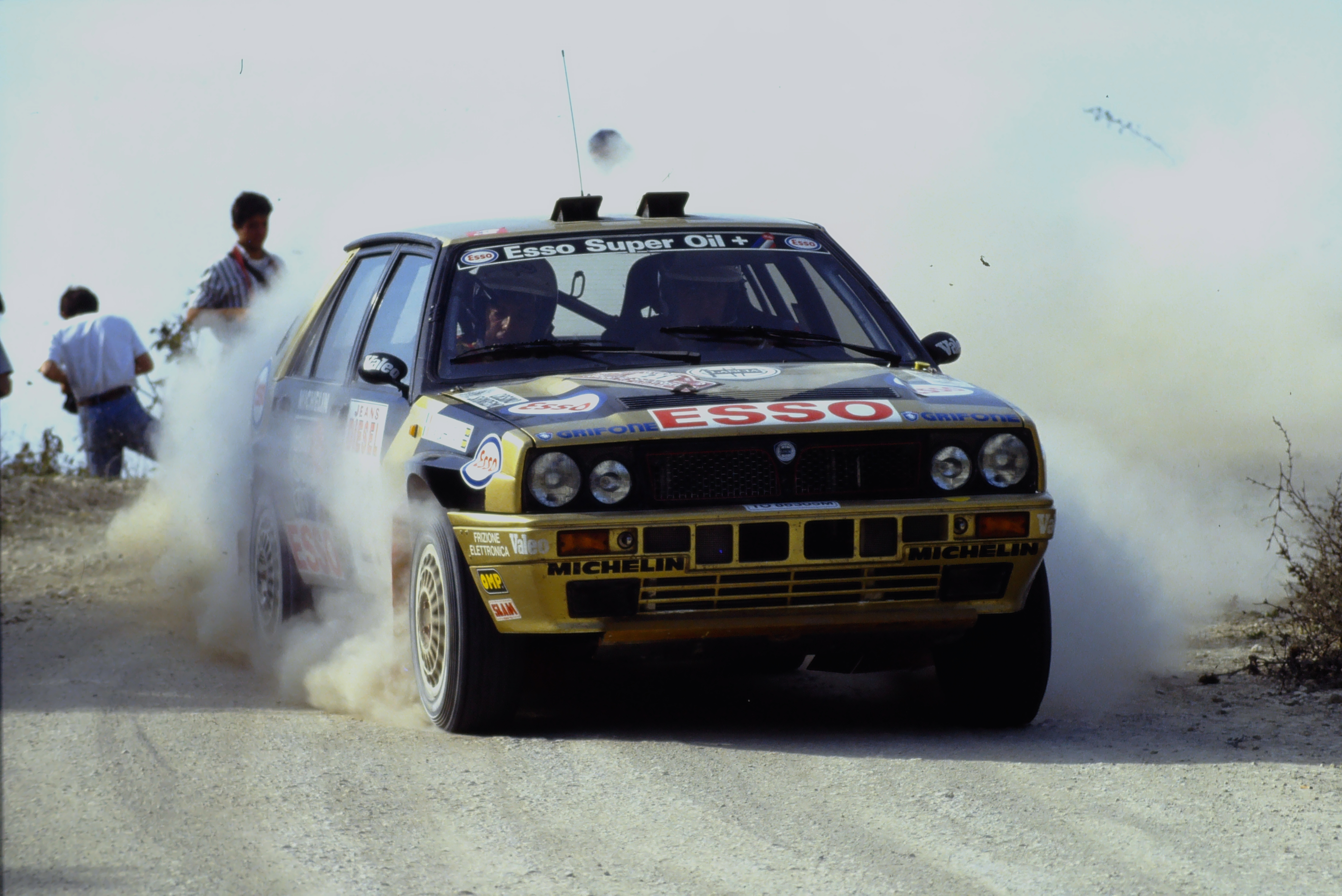
- Liatti and co-driver Luciano Tedeschini on Lancia Delta HF at the Sanremo Rally of 1990, closed in 5th place overall

Personal information
- Nationality: (Italy) Italian
- Born: 7 May 1962 (age 64); Biella

World Rally Championship record
- Years active: 1990–2004
- Co-driver: (Italy) Luciano Tedeschini (Italy) Alessandro Alessandrini (Italy) Luigi Pirollo (Italy) Mario Ferfoglia (Italy) Fabrizia Pons (Italy) Carlo Cassina (Italy) Vanda Geninatti
- Teams: Subaru, Ford, SEAT, Hyundai
- Rallies: 53
- Championships: 0
- Rally wins: 1
- Podiums: 9
- Stage wins: 72
- Total points: 164
- First rally: 1990 San Remo Rally
- First win: 1997 Monte Carlo Rally
- Last rally: 2004 Rally Sardinia

Piero Liatti (born 7 May 1962) is an Italian rally driver. His specialty was driving on tarmac rallies like Monte Carlo, Catalunya, Corsica and the San Remo Rally.

As of 2024, Liatti is the last Italian driver to win a rally in the World Rally Championship.

== Biography ==
Liatti's WRC career began as a private entrant, driving a Lancia Delta Integrale, then a Subaru Impreza. His exploits in the Subaru in 1994 caught the eye of the Prodrive Subaru team and he was signed by then for 1995 through to 1998. A year each with SEAT, Ford and Hyundai team followed before, in 2002 he found himself without a works drive. 2003 saw him return to the WRC, albeit as a private entrant in a Super 1600 class Peugeot 206.

The highlight of Liatti's career was in 1996 when he came fifth in the World Rally Championship with the Subaru 555 team gaining no less than 56 points. Other highlights were wins in the Sanremo rally in 1995 (although that year, the event was not a round of the WRC) and the Monte Carlo rally in 1997.

== WRC results ==
=== Victories ===
#	Event	Season	Co-driver	Car
1	(Monaco) 65ème Rallye Automobile de Monte-Carlo	1997	Fabrizia Pons	Subaru Impreza WRC 97

=== Results ===
Year	Entrant	Car	1	2	3	4	5	6	7	8	9	10	11	12	13	14	15	16	WDC	Points
1990	Piero Liatti	Lancia Delta Integrale 16V	MON	POR	KEN	FRA	GRC	NZL	ARG	FIN	AUS	ITA; 5	CIV	GBR					27th	8
1991	A.R.T. Engineering	Lancia Delta Integrale 16V	MON	SWE	POR	KEN	FRA	GRC	NZL	ARG	FIN	AUS	ITA; 5	CIV	ESP	GBR			40th	4
1992	A.R.T. Engineering	Lancia Delta Integrale 16V	MON	SWE	POR	KEN	FRA; 8	GRC	NZL; 2	ARG	FIN	AUS	ITA; 7	CIV	ESP	GBR			12th	22
1993	A.R.T. Engineering	Subaru Legacy RS	MON	SWE	POR	KEN	FRA	GRC	ARG	NZL	FIN	AUS	ITA; 4	ESP	GBR				24th	10
1994	A.R.T. Engineering	Subaru Impreza 555	MON	POR	KEN	FRA	GRC	ARG	NZL	FIN	ITA; Ret	GBR							-	0
1995	555 Subaru World Rally Team	Subaru Impreza 555	MON; 8	SWE	POR	FRA; 6	NZL	AUS	ESP; 3	GBR									8th	21
1996	555 Subaru WRT	Subaru Impreza 555	SWE; 12	KEN; 5	IDN; 2	GRC; 4	ARG; 7	FIN; DNS	AUS; 7	ITA; Ret	ESP; 2								5th	56
1997	555 Subaru WRT	Subaru Impreza WRC'97	MON; 1	SWE	KEN	POR	ESP; 2	FRA; 5	ARG	GRC	NZL	FIN	IDN	ITA; 2	AUS	GBR; 7			6th	24
1998	555 Subaru WRT	Subaru Impreza WRC'98	MON; 4	SWE; 9	KEN; Ret	POR; 6	ESP; Ret	FRA; 3	ARG; 6	GRC; 6	NZL; 6	FIN	ITA; 2	AUS; Ret	GBR				7th	17
1999	Seat Sport	Seat Cordoba WRC	MON; 6	SWE	KEN; Ret	POR; Ret	ESP; 10	FRA; 9	ARG; Ret	GRC; Ret	NZL	FIN							23rd	1
1999	Seat Sport	Seat Cordoba WRC Evo2											CHN; Ret	ITA; Ret	AUS	GBR			23rd	1
2000	Ford Motor Co Ltd	Ford Focus RS WRC '00	MON	SWE	KEN	POR	ESP	ARG	GRC	NZL	FIN	CYP	FRA; 6	ITA; Ret	AUS	GBR			24th	1
2001	Hyundai Castrol WRT	Hyundai Accent WRC	MON; Ret	SWE	POR														-	0
2001	Hyundai Castrol WRT	Hyundai Accent WRC2				ESP; Ret	ARG	CYP; Ret	GRC	KEN	FIN	NZL	ITA; Ret	FRA; 8	AUS	GBR; Ret			-	0
2003	Piero Liatti	Peugeot 206 S1600	MON	SWE	TUR	NZL	ARG	GRC	CYP	GER	FIN	AUS	ITA; 15	FRA	ESP	GBR			-	0
2004	Piero Liatti	Peugeot 206 S1600	MON	SWE	MEX	NZL	CYP	GRE	TUR	ARG	FIN	GER	JPN	GBR	ITA; Ret	FRA	ESP	AUS	-	0

=== Summary ===
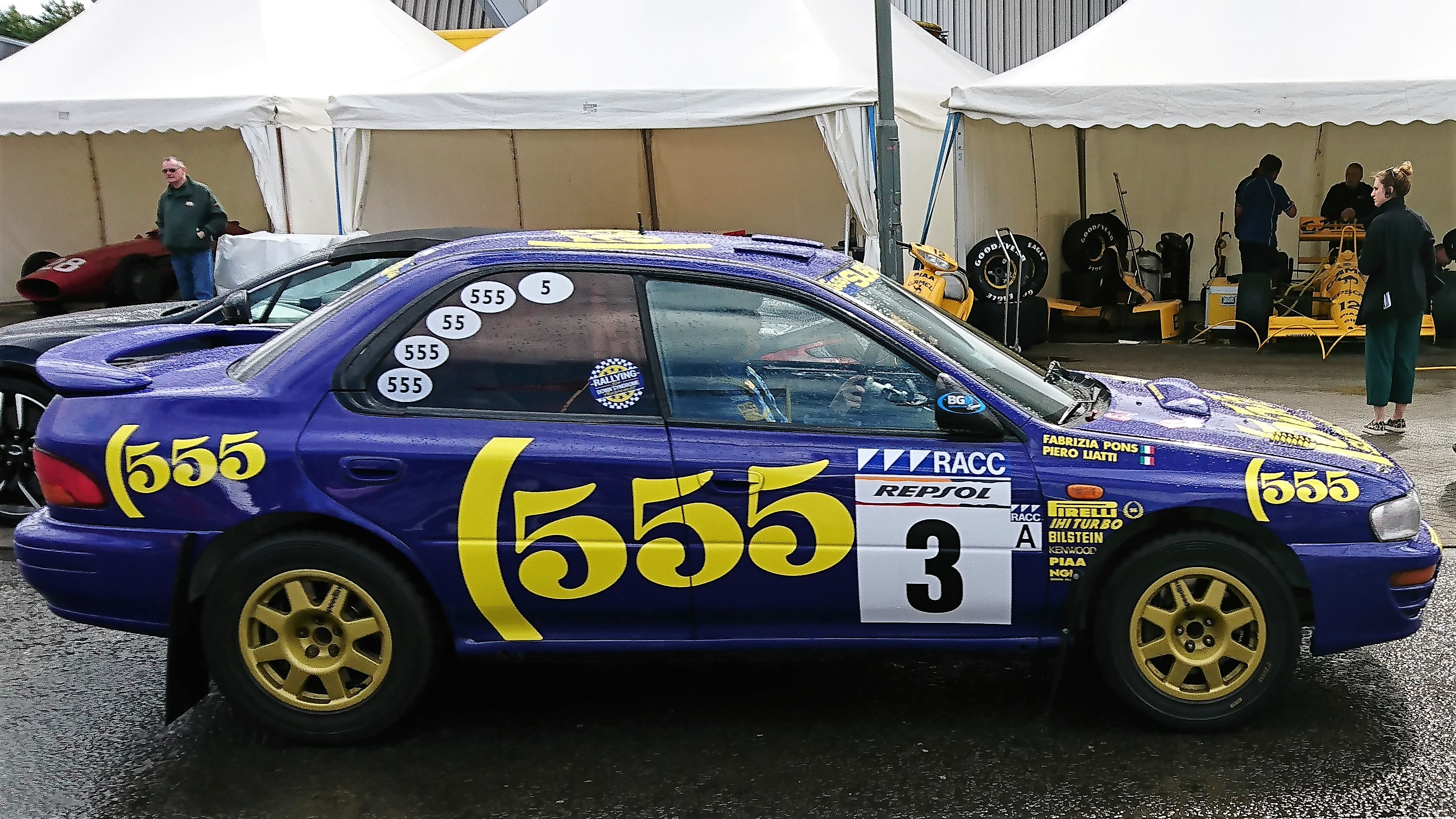
Liatti finished fifth in the 1996 World Rally Championship standings, his highest overall position during his WRC career. His car was paraded at the 2017 Ignition Festival of Motoring.

Year	Team	Starts	Wins	Podiums	DNF's	Points	Rank
1990	Private	1	0	0	0	8	31st
1991	Private	1	0	0	0	4	46th
1992	Private	3	0	1	0	22	12th
1993	Private	1	0	0	0	10	26th
1994	Private	1	0	0	1	0	-
1995	Subaru	3	0	1	0	21	8th
1996	Subaru	8	0	2	1	56	5th
1997	Subaru	5	1	3	0	24	6th
1998	Subaru	11	0	2	3	17	7th
1999	SEAT	9	0	0	6	1	23rd
2000	Ford	2	0	0	1	1	24th
2001	Hyundai	6	0	0	5	0	-
2003	Private	1	0	0	0	0	-
2004	Private	1	0	0	1	0	-

Sporting positions
Preceded by Robert Droogmans	European Rally Champion; 1991	Succeeded by Erwin Weber
