= Robert Droogmans =

Belgian rally driver (born 1954)

Personal information
- Nationality: (Belgium) Belgian
- Born: September 5, 1954 (age 72)

World Rally Championship record
- Years active: 1987–1990
- Co-driver: (Belgium) Ronny Joosten
- Teams: Jolly Club
- Rallies: 3
- Championships: 0
- Rally wins: 0
- Podiums: 0
- Stage wins: 0
- Total points: 1
- First rally: 1987 Rallye Monte Carlo
- Last rally: 1990 RAC Rally

Robert Droogmans nicknamed The Droog (born 5 September 1954) is a Belgian former rally driver. He was European Rally Champion in 1990.

Sporting positions
| Preceded by Yves Loubet | European Rally Champion; 1990 | Succeeded by Piero Liatti |
