= Erwin Weber =

German rally driver (born 1959)

Personal information
- Nationality: (Germany) German
- Born: June 12, 1959 (age 67); Munich, Germany

World Rally Championship record
- Years active: 1985–1990, 1995–1997
- Co-driver: (Germany) Gunter Wanger (Germany) Matthias Feltz (Germany) Manfred Hiemer
- Teams: Opel; Toyota; Volkswagen; SEAT
- Rallies: 22
- Rally wins: 0
- Podiums: 4
- Total points: 93
- First rally: 1985 Safari Rally
- Last rally: 1997 Rally of Indonesia

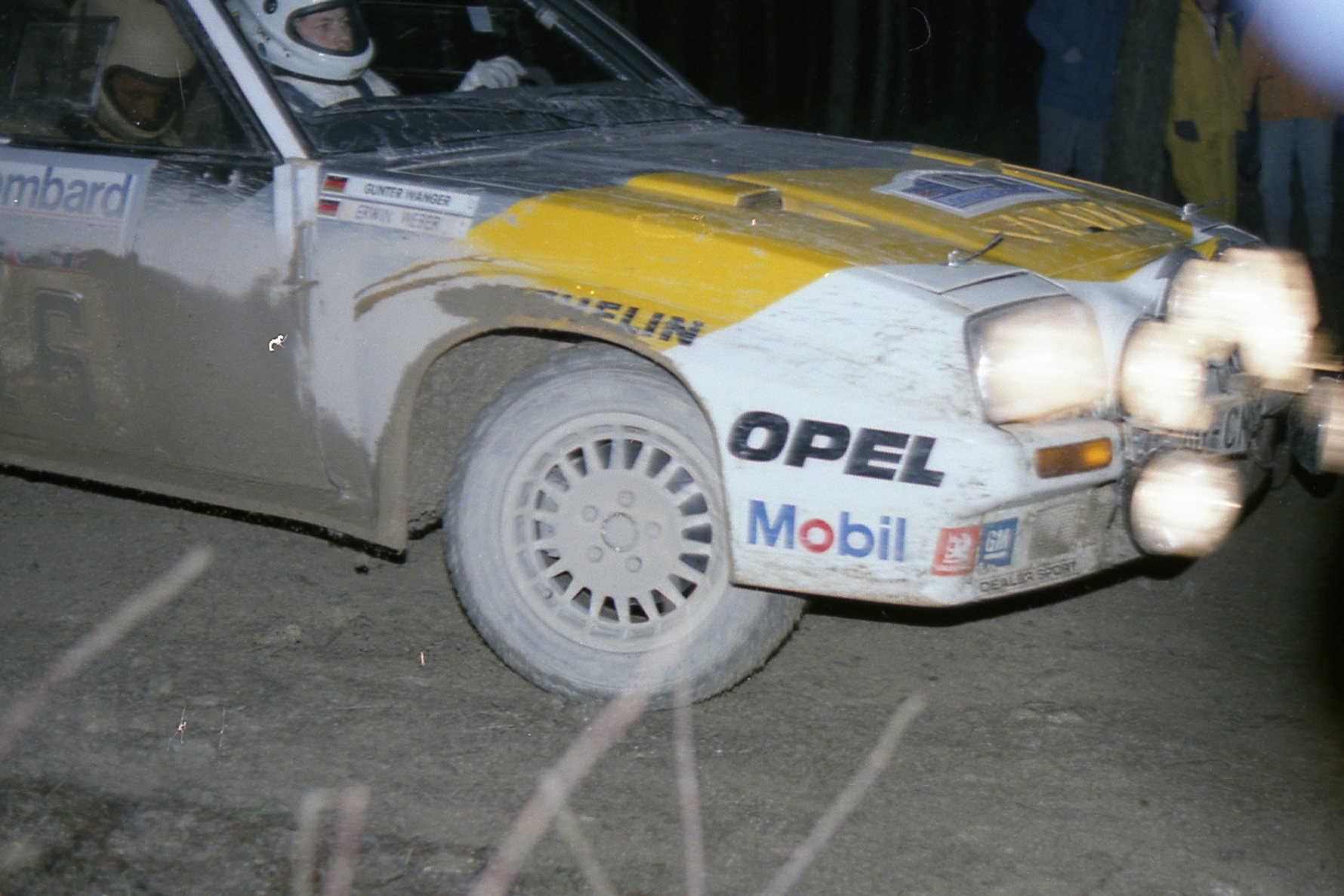
Erwin Weber in RAC Lombard Rally. Dalby Forest, Scarborough. UK November 1985

Erwin Weber (born 12 June 1959 in Munich) is a former German rally driver. He was the winner of the European Rally Championship in 1992, finished on the podium four times in the World Rally Championship.

Alongside, and following, his WRC career, Weber drover for the manufacturer Mitsubishi team in Rally Raid events, finishing 2nd in the 1992 Dakar Rally. After Mitsubishi, he joined the works Seat Rally Raid outfit, finished third on the 1994 Baja Aragón. Later, 2004, he was Team Manager for the X-Raid BMW team in Rally Raid and Dakar events.

== Podiums (WRC) ==
Year	Rally	Co-driver	Car	Pos.
1986	(Ivory Coast) Rallye Côte d'Ivoire	(West Germany) Gunter Wanger	Toyota Celica	3rd
1987	Rally Argentina	(West Germany) Matthias Feltz	Volkswagen Golf GTI	3rd
1987	(Ivory Coast) Rallye Côte d'Ivoire	(West Germany) Matthias Feltz	Volkswagen Golf GTI	3rd
1990	Rally New Zealand	(West Germany) Matthias Feltz	Volkswagen Golf Rallye G60	3rd
