= 1989 World Rally Championship =

17th season of the FIA World Rally Championship

Champions
- World Drivers' Champion: Miki Biasion
- World Manufacturers' Champion: Lancia

Seasons
- ← 1988 1990 →

The 1989 World Rally Championship was the 17th season of the Fédération Internationale de l'Automobile (FIA) World Rally Championship (WRC). The season consisted of 13 rallies, with some adjustments to the schedule versus the previous season. The WRC ended its participation in North America by removing the Olympus Rally from the schedule, implementing in its place Rally Australia. An anomaly in the schedule was that 1989 was the only year in which the Swedish Rally and the Rallye de Monte Carlo were switched in place, with the Swedish event taking place to start the year. This made it the second and last time that Monte Carlo would not mark the first event of the WRC season until the 2009 season.

Martini Lancia continued their domination of the sport for a third year in 1989, winning the first six rallies in which manufacturer points were awarded, and ultimately winning the title with plenty of room to spare. Italian Miki Biasion, Finn Markku Alén and Frenchman Bruno Saby returned to the team, while other successful drivers employed by the team through the year included French native Didier Auriol, Swede Mikael Ericsson, and Argentine driver Jorge Recalde. The team drove the Lancia Delta Integrale through the year. The car also remained the one of choice for the Jolly Club team's main drivers, Italians Alex Fiorio and Dario Cerrato. Complementing the manufacturer's success in the standings, Lancia drivers placed well throughout the top ranks in the drivers championship as well. Biasion seized the championship handily, becoming the WRC's second repeat champion, while Fiorio settled for a distant second, a position fought for through the year against Toyota's driver, Kankkunen. Other successful Lancia pilots included Mikael Ericsson in fourth and Auriol behind him in fifth place.

Toyota Team Europe represented the only serious challenge to Martini and the Lancias with it Toyota Celica GT-Four and a stable of drivers that included former world champion Finn Juha Kankkunen and the only Group A winner, Swede Kenneth Eriksson, as well as a rising star from Spain, Carlos Sainz. All three had successes during the year, though the team was never able to overcome Lancia's early domination of the manufacturer title race. Kankkunen challenged for second overall, but ultimately had to settle for third place, while Kenneth Eriksson took sixth and Sainz finished in eighth.

After an initial win in Sweden by its main driver, Swede Ingvar Carlsson, Mazda Rally Team Europe was unable to repeat their success, yet still captured third overall amongst manufacturers while Carlsson took seventh in the driver championship standings. Mitsubishi's competitive team Ralliart made its entrance to the WRC scene, taking two rally wins with its Galant VR-4 car, one by Swede Mikael Ericsson in Finland and a second by Finn Pentti Airikkala in England. Ericsson's victory in Finland followed his win in the previous round in Argentina driving a Lancia, giving him the distinction of being the first winner of consecutive WRC events for different manufacturers. Mitsubishi was able to obtain fourth place overall in the standings. The Audi Quattro continued to be competitive in the hands of privateers during the early part of the season, garnering the maker with enough points for fifth, while Simon Racing's Renault 5 GT Turbo powered their driver, Frenchman Alain Oreille to victory in the Ivory Coast and 10th place in the driver standings while securing sixth for the manufacturer.

For 1989, the number of rallies for which manufacturer points would be awarded was reduced to ten of the thirteen events, with events in Sweden, the Ivory Coast, and New Zealand only counting towards the driver titles.

== Calendar ==
Rd.	Start date	Finish date	Rally	Rally headquarters	Surface	Stages	Distance	Points
1	6 January	8 January	(Sweden) 39th International Swedish Rally	Karlstad, Värmland County	Snow	37	504.41 km	Drivers only
2	22 January	26 January	(Monaco) 57th Rallye Automobile Monte-Carlo	Monte Carlo	Mixed	24	613.25 km	Drivers & Manufacturers
3	28 February	4 March	23rd Rallye de Portugal - Vinho do Porto	Estoril, Lisbon	Mixed	38	593.60 km	Drivers & Manufacturers
4	23 March	27 March	(Kenya) 37th Marlboro Safari Rally	Nairobi	Gravel	N/A	4538 km	Drivers & Manufacturers
5	23 April	26 April	33rd Tour de Corse - Rallye de France	Ajaccio, Corsica	Tarmac	33	628.71 km	Drivers & Manufacturers
6	28 May	31 May	(Greece) 36th Acropolis Rally	Athens	Gravel	42	588.51 km	Drivers & Manufacturers
7	15 July	18 July	20th Rothmans Rally of New Zealand	Auckland	Gravel	42	595.00 km	Drivers only
8	2 August	5 August	9th Rally Argentina	Córdoba	Gravel	30	598.57 km	Drivers & Manufacturers
9	25 August	27 August	(Finland) 39th 1000 Lakes Rally	Jyväskylä, Central Finland	Gravel	43	507.83 km	Drivers & Manufacturers
10	14 September	17 September	2nd Commonwealth Bank Rally Australia	Perth, Western Australia	Gravel	32	544.27 km	Drivers & Manufacturers
11	8 October	12 October	(Italy) 31st Rallye Sanremo - Rallye d'Italia	Sanremo, Liguria	Mixed	33	544.20 km	Drivers & Manufacturers
12	29 October	2 November	(Ivory Coast) 21st Rallye Cote d'Ivoire	Abidjan	Gravel	N/A	3528 km	Drivers only
13	19 November	23 November	(United Kingdom) 45th Lombard RAC Rally	Nottingham	Gravel	55	603.57 km	Drivers & Manufacturers

== Teams and Drivers ==
Team	Manufacturer	Car	Tyre	Drivers	Rounds
(Japan) Mazda Rally Team Europe	Mazda	323 4WD	M	(Finland) Timo Salonen	1–2, 9, 13
(Japan) Mazda Rally Team Europe	Mazda	323 4WD	M	(Sweden) Ingvar Carlsson	1, 7, 10, 13
(Japan) Mazda Rally Team Europe	Mazda	323 4WD	M	(Finland) Hannu Mikkola	2, 9, 13
(Japan) Mazda Rally Team Europe	Mazda	323 4WD	M	(Finland) Mikael Sundström	1, 9, 13
(Japan) Mazda Rally Team Europe	Mazda	323 4WD	M	(Sweden) Thorbjörn Edling	1, 9
(Japan) Mazda Rally Team Europe	Mazda	323 4WD	M	(Belgium) Grégoire de Mévius	1–4, 6, 9, 11–13
(Japan) Mazda Rally Team Europe	Mazda	323 4WD	M	(New Zealand) Rod Millen	7, 10
(Japan) Mazda Rally Team Europe	Mazda	323 4WD	M	(Belgium) Didier Monin	12
(Italy) Martini Lancia	Lancia	Delta HF Integrale; Delta HF Integrale 16V	M	(Sweden) Mikael Ericsson	1, 8
(Italy) Martini Lancia	Lancia	Delta HF Integrale; Delta HF Integrale 16V	M	(France) Bruno Saby	2, 5
(Italy) Martini Lancia	Lancia	Delta HF Integrale; Delta HF Integrale 16V	M	(Italy) Miki Biasion	2–4, 6, 9, 11
(Italy) Martini Lancia	Lancia	Delta HF Integrale; Delta HF Integrale 16V	M	(France) Didier Auriol	2–3, 5–6, 9, 11
(Italy) Martini Lancia	Lancia	Delta HF Integrale; Delta HF Integrale 16V	M	(Finland) Markku Alén	3, 9–10
(Italy) Martini Lancia	Lancia	Delta HF Integrale; Delta HF Integrale 16V	M	(Argentina) Jorge Recalde	4, 8
(Italy) Martini Lancia	Lancia	Delta HF Integrale; Delta HF Integrale 16V	M	(France) Yves Loubet	5
(Japan) Toyota Team Europe	Toyota	Celica GT-Four ST165; Supra Turbo	P	(Sweden) Kenneth Eriksson	1, 6, 9–10, 13
(Japan) Toyota Team Europe	Toyota	Celica GT-Four ST165; Supra Turbo	P	(Sweden) Leif Asterhag	1
(Japan) Toyota Team Europe	Toyota	Celica GT-Four ST165; Supra Turbo	P	(Finland) Juha Kankkunen	2–3, 5–6, 9–11, 13
(Japan) Toyota Team Europe	Toyota	Celica GT-Four ST165; Supra Turbo	P	(Sweden) Björn Waldegård	2–4
(Japan) Toyota Team Europe	Toyota	Celica GT-Four ST165; Supra Turbo	P	(Belgium) Patrick Snijers	2, 5–6, 11
(Japan) Toyota Team Europe	Toyota	Celica GT-Four ST165; Supra Turbo	P	(Spain) Carlos Sainz	2–3, 5–6, 9, 11, 13
(Japan) Toyota Team Europe	Toyota	Celica GT-Four ST165; Supra Turbo	P	(Kenya) Ian Duncan	4
(Japan) Toyota Team Europe	Toyota	Celica GT-Four ST165; Supra Turbo	P	(United Kingdom) John Rowell	13
(Japan) Toyota Team Europe	Toyota	Celica GT-Four ST165; Supra Turbo	P	(United Kingdom) Graham Middleton	13
(United Kingdom) GM Euro Sport	Vauxhall Opel	Astra GTE; Kadett GSI 16V	M	(United Kingdom) Malcolm Wilson	1, 7, 10, 13
(United Kingdom) GM Euro Sport	Vauxhall Opel	Astra GTE; Kadett GSI 16V	M	(Sweden) Mats Jonsson	1, 7, 9, 13
(United Kingdom) GM Euro Sport	Vauxhall Opel	Astra GTE; Kadett GSI 16V	M	(Sweden) Björn Johansson	1
(United Kingdom) GM Euro Sport	Vauxhall Opel	Astra GTE; Kadett GSI 16V	M	(Sweden) Håkan Eriksson	1
(United Kingdom) GM Euro Sport	Vauxhall Opel	Astra GTE; Kadett GSI 16V	M	(Austria) Sepp Haider	9–10, 13
(United Kingdom) GM Euro Sport	Vauxhall Opel	Astra GTE; Kadett GSI 16V	M	(United Kingdom) Louise Aitken-Walker	13
(United Kingdom) GM Euro Sport	Vauxhall Opel	Astra GTE; Kadett GSI 16V	M	(United Kingdom) Brian Wiggins	13
(United Kingdom) GM Euro Sport	Vauxhall Opel	Astra GTE; Kadett GSI 16V	M	(United Kingdom) James Sutherland	13
(Italy) Top Run SRL	Lancia	Delta HF Integrale; Delta HF Integrale 16V	M	(Uruguay) Gustavo Trelles	1, 3, 6, 8–9, 11–13
(Italy) Top Run SRL	Lancia	Delta HF Integrale; Delta HF Integrale 16V	M	(Sweden) Fredrik Skoghag	1–3, 6–7, 9–13
(Italy) Top Run SRL	Lancia	Delta HF Integrale; Delta HF Integrale 16V	M	(Belgium) Pascal Gaban	2–3, 6, 9, 11–12
(Italy) Top Run SRL	Lancia	Delta HF Integrale; Delta HF Integrale 16V	M	(Italy) Giovanni Recordati	2–3, 6
(Italy) Top Run SRL	Lancia	Delta HF Integrale; Delta HF Integrale 16V	M	(Argentina) Jorge Recalde	6, 10, 13
(Italy) Top Run SRL	Lancia	Delta HF Integrale; Delta HF Integrale 16V	M	(San Marino) Massimo Ercolani	6, 11, 13
(United Kingdom) Ford Motor Co Ltd	Ford	Sierra XR 4x4 Sierra RS Cosworth	M P	(United Kingdom) Colin McRae	1, 7, 13
(United Kingdom) Ford Motor Co Ltd	Ford	Sierra XR 4x4 Sierra RS Cosworth	M P	(Portugal) Joaquim Santos	3
(United Kingdom) Ford Motor Co Ltd	Ford	Sierra XR 4x4 Sierra RS Cosworth	M P	(France) Pierre-César Baroni	5
(United Kingdom) Ford Motor Co Ltd	Ford	Sierra XR 4x4 Sierra RS Cosworth	M P	(Italy) Gianfranco Cunico	5, 13
(United Kingdom) Ford Motor Co Ltd	Ford	Sierra XR 4x4 Sierra RS Cosworth	M P	(United Kingdom) Mark Lovell	5, 13
(United Kingdom) Ford Motor Co Ltd	Ford	Sierra XR 4x4 Sierra RS Cosworth	M P	(United Kingdom) Jimmy McRae	7, 13
(United Kingdom) Ford Motor Co Ltd	Ford	Sierra XR 4x4 Sierra RS Cosworth	M P	(Qatar) Saeed Al-Hajri	7, 10
(United Kingdom) Ford Motor Co Ltd	Ford	Sierra XR 4x4 Sierra RS Cosworth	M P	(United Kingdom) Russell Brookes	13
(Italy) Jolly Club	Lancia	Delta HF Integrale	M	(Italy) Alex Fiorio	2–4, 6, 8, 10–11
(Italy) Jolly Club	Lancia	Delta HF Integrale	M	(Italy) Dario Cerrato	2, 11
(Italy) Jolly Club	Lancia	Delta HF Integrale	M	(France) Patricia Bertapelle	2
(Italy) Jolly Club	Lancia	Delta HF Integrale	M	(Italy) Paolo Andreucci	3, 6
(Italy) Jolly Club	Lancia	Delta HF Integrale	M	(Italy) Massimo Maneo	3, 11
(Japan) Mitsubishi Ralliart Europe	Mitsubishi	Galant VR-4	M	(Finland) Ari Vatanen	2, 6, 9, 13
(Japan) Mitsubishi Ralliart Europe	Mitsubishi	Galant VR-4	M	(Japan) Kenjiro Shinozuka	3, 6–7, 10
(Japan) Mitsubishi Ralliart Europe	Mitsubishi	Galant VR-4	M	(United Kingdom) Jimmy McRae	6
(Japan) Mitsubishi Ralliart Europe	Mitsubishi	Galant VR-4	M	(Australia) Ross Dunkerton	7, 10
(Japan) Mitsubishi Ralliart Europe	Mitsubishi	Galant VR-4	M	(Sweden) Mikael Ericsson	9
(Japan) Mitsubishi Ralliart Europe	Mitsubishi	Galant VR-4	M	(Finland) Lasse Lampi	9
(Japan) Mitsubishi Ralliart Europe	Mitsubishi	Galant VR-4	M	(Finland) Pentti Airikkala	13
(Germany) Audi Sport	Audi	90 Quattro; 200 Quattro; Coupé Quattro	M	(Italy) Paola de Martini	2–3, 5–6, 11–12
(Germany) Audi Sport	Audi	90 Quattro; 200 Quattro; Coupé Quattro	M	(Austria) Georg Fischer	3, 8
(Germany) Audi Sport	Audi	90 Quattro; 200 Quattro; Coupé Quattro	M	(Austria) Rudi Stohl	4, 6, 10, 12
(Germany) Audi Sport	Audi	90 Quattro; 200 Quattro; Coupé Quattro	M	(Germany) Armin Schwarz	6, 9, 11, 13
(Germany) Audi Sport	Audi	90 Quattro; 200 Quattro; Coupé Quattro	M	(Belgium) Bruno Thiry	6
(Germany) Audi Sport	Audi	90 Quattro; 200 Quattro; Coupé Quattro	M	(New Zealand) Malcolm Stewart	7
(France) Bastos Motul BMW	BMW	M3	P	(Belgium) Marc Duez	2–3, 5, 9, 11
(France) Bastos Motul BMW	BMW	M3	P	(France) Bernard Béguin	5
(France) Bastos Motul BMW	BMW	M3	P	(France) François Chatriot	5
(France) Simon Racing	Renault	5 GT Turbo	M	(France) Alain Oreille	2, 5, 10–12
(France) Simon Racing	Renault	5 GT Turbo	M	(France) Claude Balesi	5
(France) Simon Racing	Renault	5 GT Turbo	M	(France) Richard Frau	5, 11
(Japan) Nissan Motorsports International	Nissan	200SX	D	(Sweden) Per Eklund	4
(Japan) Nissan Motorsports International	Nissan	200SX	D	(Kenya) Mike Kirkland	4
(Japan) Nissan Motorsports International	Nissan	200SX	D	(Kenya) Vic Preston Jr	4
(Japan) Nissan Motorsports International	Nissan	200SX	D	(Kenya) Jayant Shah	4
(Japan) Nissan Motorsports International	Nissan	200SX	D	(Greece) Státhis Iorgakis	6
(Japan) Nissan Motorsports International	Nissan	200SX	D	(France) Alain Ambrosino	12
(Germany) Volkswagen Motorsport	Volkswagen	Golf GTI 16V	P	(Sweden) Stig Blomqvist	4
(Germany) Volkswagen Motorsport	Volkswagen	Golf GTI 16V	P	(Germany) Erwin Weber	4
(Germany) Volkswagen Motorsport	Volkswagen	Golf GTI 16V	P	(Tanzania) Manjit Sandhu	4
(Germany) Volkswagen Motorsport	Volkswagen	Golf GTI 16V	P	(Greece) Konstantinos Apostolou	6
(Japan) Subaru Technica International	Subaru	RX Turbo	D	(New Zealand) Peter 'Possum' Bourne	4, 7–8, 10
(Japan) Subaru Technica International	Subaru	RX Turbo	D	(Kenya) Patrick Njiru	4
(Japan) Subaru Technica International	Subaru	RX Turbo	D	(Kenya) Jim Heather-Hayes	4
(Japan) Subaru Technica International	Subaru	RX Turbo	D	(Chile) José Celsi	8

== Events ==
1989 World Rally Championship event map
Black = Tarmac	Brown = Gravel	Blue = Snow/Ice	Red = Mixed Surface

1989 World Rally Championship schedule and results
Round	Rally name	Stages	Podium finishers					
Round	Rally name	Stages	Rank	Driver	Co-driver	Team	Car	Time
1	(Sweden) Swedish Rally (6–8 January)	37 stages 504 km Snow/Ice	1	(Sweden) Ingvar Carlsson	(Sweden) Per Carlsson	(Japan) Mazda Rally Team Europe	Mazda 323 4WD	4:58.15
1	(Sweden) Swedish Rally (6–8 January)	37 stages 504 km Snow/Ice	2	(Sweden) Per Eklund	(United Kingdom) Dave Whittock	(Sweden) Clarion Team Europe	Lancia Delta Integrale	4:59.18
1	(Sweden) Swedish Rally (6–8 January)	37 stages 504 km Snow/Ice	3	(Sweden) Kenneth Eriksson	(Sweden) Staffan Parmander	Toyota Team Sweden	Toyota Celica GT-Four ST165	4:59.57
2	(Monaco) Rallye Automobile Monte Carlo (21–26 January)	24 stages 613 km Tarmac	1	(Italy) Miki Biasion	(Italy) Tiziano Siviero	(Italy) Martini Lancia	Lancia Delta Integrale	7:13.27
2	(Monaco) Rallye Automobile Monte Carlo (21–26 January)	24 stages 613 km Tarmac	2	(France) Didier Auriol	(France) Bernard Occelli	(Italy) Martini Lancia	Lancia Delta Integrale	7:19.54
2	(Monaco) Rallye Automobile Monte Carlo (21–26 January)	24 stages 613 km Tarmac	3	(France) Bruno Saby	(France) Jean-François Fauchille	(Italy) Martini Lancia	Lancia Delta Integrale	7:21.08
3	Rallye de Portugal (28 February–4 March)	37 stages 577 km Tarmac/Gravel	1	(Italy) Miki Biasion	(Italy) Tiziano Siviero	(Italy) Martini Lancia	Lancia Delta Integrale	6:47.01
3	Rallye de Portugal (28 February–4 March)	37 stages 577 km Tarmac/Gravel	2	(Finland) Markku Alén	(Finland) Ilkka Kivimäki	(Italy) Martini Lancia	Lancia Delta Integrale	6:57.19
3	Rallye de Portugal (28 February–4 March)	37 stages 577 km Tarmac/Gravel	3	(Italy) Alex Fiorio	(Italy) Luigi Pirollo	(Italy) Jolly Club	Lancia Delta Integrale	7:10.19
4	(Kenya) Safari Rally (31 March–4 April)	85 controls 4539 km Gravel	1	(Italy) Miki Biasion	(Italy) Tiziano Siviero	(Italy) Martini Lancia	Lancia Delta Integrale	+6:55.27 pen
4	(Kenya) Safari Rally (31 March–4 April)	85 controls 4539 km Gravel	2	(Kenya) Mike Kirkland	(Kenya) Robin Nixon	(Japan) Nissan Motorsports International	Nissan 200SX	+8:16.11 pen
4	(Kenya) Safari Rally (31 March–4 April)	85 controls 4539 km Gravel	3	(Sweden) Stig Blomqvist	(Sweden) Björn Cederberg	(Germany) Volkswagen Motorsport	Volkswagen Golf GTI 16V	+9:17.39 pen
5	(France) Tour de Corse (23–26 April)	33 stages 627 km Tarmac	1	(France) Didier Auriol	(France) Bernard Occelli	(Italy) Martini Lancia	Lancia Delta Integrale	7:12.39
5	(France) Tour de Corse (23–26 April)	33 stages 627 km Tarmac	2	(France) François Chatriot	(France) Michel Périn	(France) Bastos Motul BMW	BMW M3	7:14.36
5	(France) Tour de Corse (23–26 April)	33 stages 627 km Tarmac	3	(Finland) Juha Kankkunen	(Finland) Juha Piironen	(Japan) Toyota Team Europe	Toyota Celica GT-Four ST165	7:16.29
6	(Greece) Acropolis Rally (27 May–1 June)	42 stages 590 km Gravel	1	(Italy) Miki Biasion	(Italy) Tiziano Siviero	(Italy) Martini Lancia	Lancia Delta Integrale	7:31.43
6	(Greece) Acropolis Rally (27 May–1 June)	42 stages 590 km Gravel	2	(France) Didier Auriol	(France) Bernard Occelli	(Italy) Martini Lancia	Lancia Delta Integrale	7:33.41
6	(Greece) Acropolis Rally (27 May–1 June)	42 stages 590 km Gravel	3	(Italy) Alex Fiorio	(Italy) Luigi Pirollo	(Italy) Jolly Club	Lancia Delta Integrale	7:35.14
7	Rally New Zealand (15–18 July)	42 stages 595 km Gravel	1	(Sweden) Ingvar Carlsson	(Sweden) Per Carlsson	(Japan) Mazda Rally Team Europe	Mazda 323 4WD	6:59.55
7	Rally New Zealand (15–18 July)	42 stages 595 km Gravel	2	(New Zealand) Rod Millen	(New Zealand) Tony Sircombe	(New Zealand) Rod Millen Motorsport	Mazda 323 4WD	7:02.37
7	Rally New Zealand (15–18 July)	42 stages 595 km Gravel	3	(United Kingdom) Malcolm Wilson	(United Kingdom) Ian Grindrod	(United Kingdom) GM Euro Sport	Vauxhall Astra GTE	7:03.24
8	Rally Argentina (1–5 August)	30 stages 564 km Gravel	1	(Sweden) Mikael Ericsson	(Sweden) Claes Billstam	(Italy) Martini Lancia	Lancia Delta Integrale	7:06.00
8	Rally Argentina (1–5 August)	30 stages 564 km Gravel	2	(Italy) Alex Fiorio	(Italy) Luigi Pirollo	(Italy) Jolly Club	Lancia Delta Integrale	7:08.26
8	Rally Argentina (1–5 August)	30 stages 564 km Gravel	3	(Argentina) Jorge Recalde	(Argentina) Jorge del Bouno	(Italy) Martini Lancia	Lancia Delta Integrale	7:19.42
9	(Finland) 1000 Lakes Rally (25–27 August)	43 stages 507 km Gravel	1	(Sweden) Mikael Ericsson	(Sweden) Claes Billstam	(Japan) Mitsubishi Ralliart Europe	Mitsubishi Galant VR-4	4:42.03
9	(Finland) 1000 Lakes Rally (25–27 August)	43 stages 507 km Gravel	2	(Finland) Timo Salonen	(Finland) Voitto Silander	(Japan) Mazda Rally Team Europe	Mazda 323 4WD	4:43.44
9	(Finland) 1000 Lakes Rally (25–27 August)	43 stages 507 km Gravel	3	(Spain) Carlos Sainz	(Spain) Luis Moya	(Japan) Toyota Team Europe	Toyota Celica GT-Four ST165	4:44.38
10	Rally Australia (14–17 September)	32 stages 544 km Gravel	1	(Finland) Juha Kankkunen	(Finland) Juha Piironen	(Japan) Toyota Team Europe	Toyota Celica GT-Four ST165	5:32.09
10	Rally Australia (14–17 September)	32 stages 544 km Gravel	2	(Sweden) Kenneth Eriksson	(Sweden) Staffan Parmander	(Japan) Toyota Team Europe	Toyota Celica GT-Four ST165	5:33.16
10	Rally Australia (14–17 September)	32 stages 544 km Gravel	3	(Finland) Markku Alén	(Finland) Ilkka Kivimäki	(Italy) Martini Lancia	Lancia Delta Integrale	5:34.22
11	(Italy) Rallye Sanremo (8–12 October)	34 stages 544 km Tarmac/Gravel	1	(Italy) Miki Biasion	(Italy) Tiziano Siviero	(Italy) Martini Lancia	Lancia Delta Integrale 16V	6:48.30
11	(Italy) Rallye Sanremo (8–12 October)	34 stages 544 km Tarmac/Gravel	2	(Italy) Alex Fiorio	(Italy) Luigi Pirollo	(Italy) Jolly Club	Lancia Delta Integrale	6:48.35
11	(Italy) Rallye Sanremo (8–12 October)	34 stages 544 km Tarmac/Gravel	3	(Spain) Carlos Sainz	(Spain) Luis Moya	(Japan) Toyota Team Europe	Toyota Celica GT-Four ST165	6:48.55
12	(Ivory Coast) Rallye Côte d'Ivoire (29 October–2 November)	87 controls 3528 km Gravel	1	(France) Alain Oreille	(France) Gilles Thimonier	(France) Simon Racing	Renault 5 GT Turbo	+8:32.54 pen
12	(Ivory Coast) Rallye Côte d'Ivoire (29 October–2 November)	87 controls 3528 km Gravel	2	(France) Patrick Tauziac	(France) Claude Papin	(Japan) Ralliart	Mitsubishi Starion Turbo	+11:36.50 pen
12	(Ivory Coast) Rallye Côte d'Ivoire (29 October–2 November)	87 controls 3528 km Gravel	3	(France) Adolphe Choteau	(France) Jean-Pierre Claverie	(Belgium) Thiébaut Racing	Toyota Corolla GT	+13:41.07 pen
13	(United Kingdom) RAC Rally (19–23 November)	55 stages 603 km Gravel/Tarmac	1	(Finland) Pentti Airikkala	(United Kingdom) Ronan McNamee	(Japan) Mitsubishi Ralliart Europe	Mitsubishi Galant VR-4	6:19.22
13	(United Kingdom) RAC Rally (19–23 November)	55 stages 603 km Gravel/Tarmac	2	(Spain) Carlos Sainz	(Spain) Luis Moya	(Japan) Toyota Team Europe	Toyota Celica GT-Four ST165	6:20.50
13	(United Kingdom) RAC Rally (19–23 November)	55 stages 603 km Gravel/Tarmac	3	(Finland) Juha Kankkunen	(Finland) Juha Piironen	(Japan) Toyota Team Europe	Toyota Celica GT-Four ST165	6:23.11

== Championship for manufacturers ==
Pos.	Manufacturer	(Monaco) MON	(Portugal) POR	(Kenya) KEN	(France) FRA	(Greece) GRC	(Argentina) ARG	(Finland) FIN	(Australia) AUS	(Italy) ITA	(United Kingdom) GBR	Points
1	(Italy) Lancia	20	20	20	20	20	20	(8)	(14)	20	-	140
2	(Japan) Toyota	10	-	12	14	-	-	14	20	14	17	101
3	(Japan) Mazda	12	12	-	-	-	-	17	10	8	8	67
4	(Japan) Mitsubishi	-	-	-	-	12	-	20	6	-	20	58
5	(Germany) Audi	2	12	-	3	8	12	6	-	-	-	43
6	(Germany) BMW	4	10	-	17	-	-	-	-	6	-	37
7	(France) Renault	9	-	-	11	-	-	-	-	10	-	30
8	(Japan) Nissan	-	-	17	-	1	-	-	-	-	-	18
9	(Germany) Volkswagen	-	-	14	-	-	-	-	-	-	-	14
10	Renault Argentina	-	-	-	-	-	10	-	-	-	-	15
11	(United Kingdom) Vauxhall	-	-	-	-	-	-	-	8	-	1	9
12	(Japan) Subaru	-	-	6	-	-	-	-	1	-	-	7
13	(United Kingdom) Ford	-	-	-	6	-	-	-	-	-	-	6
14	Fiat Argentina	-	-	-	-	-	3	-	-	-	-	3
15	Volkswagen Argentina	-	-	-	-	-	1	-	-	-	-	1
Pos.	Manufacturer	(Monaco) MON	(Portugal) POR	(Kenya) KEN	(France) FRA	(Greece) GRC	(Argentina) ARG	(Finland) FIN	(Australia) AUS	(Italy) ITA	(United Kingdom) GBR	Points

Schedule of points by place:

Place	1st	2nd	3rd	4th	5th	6th	7th	8th	9th	10th
Points	20	15	12	10	8	6	4	3	2	1

== Championship for drivers ==
Pos.	Driver	(Sweden) SWE	(Monaco) MON	(Portugal) POR	(Kenya) KEN	(France) FRA	(Greece) GRC	(New Zealand) NZL	(Argentina) ARG	(Finland) FIN	(Australia) AUS	(Italy) ITA	(Ivory Coast) CIV	(United Kingdom) GBR	Points
1	(Italy) Miki Biasion	-	1	1	1	-	1	-	-	6	-	1	-	-	106
2	(Italy) Alex Fiorio	-	Ret	3	10	-	3	-	2	-	4	2	-	-	65
3	(Finland) Juha Kankkunen	-	5	Ret	-	3	Ret	-	-	Ret	1	5	-	3	60
4	(Sweden) Mikael Ericsson	4	-	-	-	-	-	-	1	1	-	-	-	-	50
5	(France) Didier Auriol	-	2	Ret	-	1	2	-	-	Ret	-	Ret	-	-	50
6	(Sweden) Kenneth Eriksson	3	-	-	-	-	Ret	-	-	4	2	-	-	4	47
7	(Sweden) Ingvar Carlsson	1	-	-	-	-	-	1	-	-	Ret	-	-	8	43
8	(Spain) Carlos Sainz	-	Ret	Ret	-	Ret	Ret	-	-	3	-	3	-	2	39
9	(Finland) Markku Alén	-	-	2	-	-	-	-	-	Ret	3	-	-	-	27
10	(France) Alain Oreille	-	10	-	-	8	-	-	-	-	12	9	1	-	26
11	(New Zealand) Rod Millen	-	-	-	-	-	-	2	-	-	5	-	-	-	23
12	(Finland) Timo Salonen	22	Ret	-	-	-	-	-	-	2	-	-	-	6	21
13	(Belgium) Marc Duez	-	8	5	-	6	-	-	-	-	-	7	-	-	21
14	(Finland) Pentti Airikkala	-	-	-	-	-	-	-	-	-	-	-	-	1	20
15	(Sweden) Stig Blomqvist	5	-	-	3	-	-	-	-	-	-	-	-	-	20
15	(Argentina) Jorge Recalde	-	-	-	Ret	-	8	-	3	-	-	-	-	-	20
17	(Austria) Georg Fischer	-	-	4	-	-	-	-	4	-	-	-	-	-	20
18	(United Kingdom) Malcolm Wilson	13	-	-	-	-	-	3	-	-	6	-	-	10	19
19	(Sweden) Per Eklund	2	Ret	-	Ret	-	10	-	-	-	-	-	-	-	16
20	(Kenya) Mike Kirkland	-	-	-	2	-	-	-	-	-	-	-	-	-	15
20	(France) François Chatriot	-	-	-	-	2	-	-	-	-	-	-	-	-	15
20	(France) Patrick Tauziac	-	-	-	-	-	-	-	-	-	-	-	2	-	15
23	(Italy) Dario Cerrato	-	7	-	-	-	-	-	-	-	-	4	-	-	14
24	(Japan) Kenjiro Shinozuka	-	-	18	-	-	7	6	-	-	7	-	-	-	14
25	(France) Bruno Saby	-	3	-	-	Ret	-	-	-	-	-	-	-	-	12
25	(France) Adolphe Choteau	-	-	-	-	-	-	-	-	-	-	-	3	-	12
27	(Finland) Hannu Mikkola	-	4	-	-	-	-	-	-	-	-	-	-	9	12
28	(Belgium) Patrick Snijers	-	6	-	-	Ret	-	-	-	-	-	6	-	-	12
29	(Sweden) Björn Waldegård	-	Ret	Ret	4	-	-	-	-	-	-	-	-	-	10
29	(France) Yves Loubet	-	-	-	-	4	-	-	-	-	-	-	-	-	10
29	(United Kingdom) Jimmy McRae	-	-	-	-	-	4	-	-	-	-	-	-	-	10
29	(Sweden) Mats Jonsson	12	-	-	-	-	-	4	-	-	-	-	-	-	10
29	(France) André Segolen	-	-	-	-	-	-	-	-	-	-	-	4	-	10
34	(Kenya) Ian Duncan	-	-	-	5	-	-	-	-	-	-	-	-	-	8
34	(France) Bernard Béguin	-	-	-	-	5	-	-	-	-	-	-	-	-	8
34	(United Kingdom) Colin McRae	15	-	-	-	-	-	5	-	-	-	-	-	-	8
34	(Argentina) Ernesto Soto	-	-	-	-	-	-	-	5	-	-	-	-	-	8
34	(Sweden) Thorbjörn Edling	Ret	-	-	-	-	-	-	-	5	-	-	-	-	8
34	(France) Patrice Servant	-	-	-	-	-	-	-	-	-	-	-	5	-	8
34	(Finland) Ari Vatanen	-	Ret	-	-	-	-	-	-	-	-	-	-	5	8
41	(Germany) Armin Schwarz	-	-	-	-	-	8	-	-	7	-	-	-	-	7
42	(Finland) Sebastian Lindholm	6	-	-	-	-	-	-	-	-	-	-	-	-	6
42	(Portugal) Carlos Bica	-	-	6	-	-	-	-	-	-	-	-	-	-	6
42	(Kenya) Vic Preston Jr	-	-	-	6	-	-	-	-	-	-	-	-	-	6
42	(Austria) Rudi Stohl	-	-	-	Ret	-	6	-	-	-	-	-	-	-	6
42	(Argentina) Fernando Stella	-	-	-	-	-	-	-	6	-	-	-	-	-	6
42	(France) José Graziani	-	-	-	-	-	-	-	-	-	-	-	6	-	6
48	(Sweden) Stig-Olov Walfridsson	8	-	-	-	-	-	-	-	8	-	-	-	-	6
49	(Belgium) Grégoire de Mévius	-	12	7	Ret	-	-	-	-	-	-	10	-	-	5
49	(Uruguay) Gustavo Trelles	-	-	10	-	-	-	-	7	-	-	-	-	-	5
49	(New Zealand) Possum Bourne	-	-	-	7	-	-	-	-	-	10	-	-	-	5
52	(Sweden) Leif Asterhag	7	-	-	-	-	-	-	-	-	-	-	-	-	4
52	(Italy) Gianfranco Cunico	-	-	-	-	7	-	-	-	-	-	-	-	-	4
52	(New Zealand) Ray Wilson	-	-	-	-	-	-	7	-	-	-	-	-	-	4
52	(France) Benoît Antoine	-	-	-	-	-	-	-	-	-	-	-	7	-	4
52	(Finland) Mikael Sundström	Ret	-	-	-	-	-	-	-	-	-	-	-	7	4
57	(Italy) Paola De Martini	-	9	Ret	-	9	-	-	-	-	-	-	-	-	4
58	(Italy) Paolo Andreucci	-	-	8	-	-	-	-	-	-	-	-	-	-	3
58	(Germany) Erwin Weber	-	-	-	8	-	-	-	-	-	-	-	-	-	3
58	(Qatar) Saeed Al-Hajri	-	-	-	-	-	-	8	-	-	-	-	-	-	3
58	(Argentina) Juan Maria Traverso	-	-	-	-	-	-	-	8	-	-	-	-	-	3
58	(Australia) Wayne Bell	-	-	-	-	-	-	-	-	-	8	-	-	-	3
58	(Italy) Paolo Alessandrini	-	-	-	-	-	-	-	-	-	-	8	-	-	3
64	(Sweden) Björn Johansson	9	-	-	-	-	-	-	-	-	-	-	-	-	2
64	(Sweden) Fredrik Skoghag	-	Ret	9	-	-	-	-	-	-	-	-	-	-	2
64	(Kenya) Jim Heather-Hayes	-	-	-	9	-	-	-	-	-	-	-	-	-	2
64	(Greece) Jigger	-	-	-	-	-	9	-	-	-	-	-	-	-	2
64	(Australia) Ross Dunkerton	-	-	-	-	-	-	9	-	-	-	-	-	-	2
64	(Argentina) Jorge Bescham	-	-	-	-	-	-	-	9	-	-	-	-	-	2
64	(Finland) Risto Buri	-	-	-	-	-	-	-	-	9	-	-	-	-	2
64	(Australia) Ed Ordynski	-	-	-	-	-	-	-	-	-	9	-	-	-	2
72	(Sweden) Hakån Eriksson	10	-	-	-	-	-	-	-	-	-	-	-	-	1
72	(France) Claude Balesi	-	-	-	-	10	-	-	-	-	-	-	-	-	1
72	(New Zealand) Ken Adamson	-	-	-	-	-	-	10	-	-	-	-	-	-	1
72	(Brazil) Edio Fuchter	-	-	-	-	-	-	-	10	-	-	-	-	-	1
72	(Finland) Esa Saarenpää	-	-	-	-	-	-	-	-	10	-	-	-	-	1
Pos.	Driver	(Sweden) SWE	(Monaco) MON	(Portugal) POR	(Kenya) KEN	(France) FRA	(Greece) GRC	(New Zealand) NZL	(Argentina) ARG	(Finland) FIN	(Australia) AUS	(Italy) ITA	(Ivory Coast) CIV	(United Kingdom) GBR	Points

Schedule of points by place:

Place	1st	2nd	3rd	4th	5th	6th	7th	8th	9th	10th
Points	20	15	12	10	8	6	4	3	2	1

== Cup for production car drivers ==
Pos.	Driver	(Sweden) SWE	(Monaco) MON	(Portugal) POR	(Kenya) KEN	(France) FRA	(Greece) GRC	(New Zealand) NZL	(Argentina) ARG	(Finland) FIN	(Australia) AUS	(Italy) ITA	(Ivory Coast) CIV	(United Kingdom) GBR	Points
1	(France) Alain Oreille	-	13	-	-	13	-	-	-	-	7	13	13	-	59
2	(Belgium) Grégoire de Mévius	4	10	13	-	-	-	-	-	-	-	11	-	13	51
3	(Uruguay) Gustavo Trelles	7	-	5	-	-	1	-	13	13	-	-	-	-	39
4	(Sweden) Fredrik Skoghag	-	-	7	-	-	2	-	-	2	10	-	-	-	21
5	(Japan) Kiyoshi Inoue	-	-	3	-	-	13	-	-	-	2	-	-	-	18
6	(Sweden) Sören Nilsson	13	-	-	-	-	-	-	-	-	-	-	-	-	13
6	(New Zealand) Ken Adamson	-	-	-	-	-	-	13	-	-	-	-	-	-	13
6	(Australia) Ed Ordynski	-	-	-	-	-	-	-	-	-	13	-	-	-	13
9	(Switzerland) Marc Hopf	-	-	-	-	-	-	-	-	-	-	5	-	7	12
10	(France) Patrice Servant	-	-	-	-	-	-	-	-	-	-	-	11	-	11
Pos.	Driver	(Sweden) SWE	(Monaco) MON	(Portugal) POR	(Kenya) KEN	(France) FRA	(Greece) GRC	(New Zealand) NZL	(Argentina) ARG	(Finland) FIN	(Australia) AUS	(Italy) ITA	(Ivory Coast) CIV	(United Kingdom) GBR	Points

== See also ==
- 1989 in sports
