= Production World Rally Championship =

Rally championship

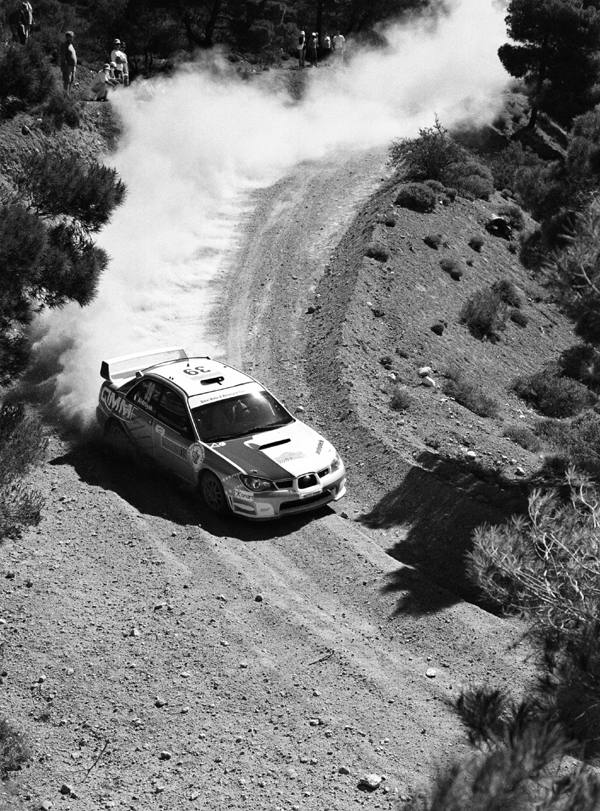
Nasser Al-Attiyah driving a Subaru Impreza WRX STI at the 2006 Acropolis Rally.

The FIA Production car World Rally Championship, or PWRC, was a companion rally series to the World Rally Championship, contested mainly by Group N rally cars.

== History ==
The series started in 1987 as FIA Cup for Production Rally Drivers and obtained the world championship status in 2002. The eligible cars were still Group N modified road cars such as the Subaru Impreza WRX and the Mitsubishi Lancer Evolution. Between 2007 and 2009 the PWRC allowed Super 2000 cars alongside regular Group N entries. In 2010 the S2000 cars were moved to a dedicated championship named SWRC (Super 2000 World Championship). With the introduction of Group R cars since 2008, the PWRC was cancelled at the end of 2012 and was replaced by the World Rally Championship-3 open exclusively to 2WD based cars homologated in R1, R2 and R3 classes. The 4WD Group N cars were moved to the new World Rally Championship-2 alongside S2000, RRC, R4 and R5 cars.

== Results ==
=== Drivers' Championship ===
Season	Champion		2nd place		3rd place	
Season	Driver	Car	Driver	Car	Driver	Car
PWRC
2012	(Mexico) Benito Guerra	Mitsubishi Lancer Evolution X	(Argentina) Marcos Ligato	Subaru Impreza WRX STI	(Ukraine) Valeriy Gorban	Mitsubishi Lancer Evolution IX
2011	(New Zealand) Hayden Paddon	Subaru Impreza WRX STI	(Sweden) Patrik Flodin	Subaru Impreza WRX STI	(Poland) Michał Kościuszko	Mitsubishi Lancer Evolution X
2010	(Portugal) Armindo Araújo	Mitsubishi Lancer Evolution X	(Sweden) Patrik Flodin	Subaru Impreza WRX STI	(New Zealand) Hayden Paddon	Mitsubishi Lancer Evolution X
2009	(Portugal) Armindo Araújo	Mitsubishi Lancer Evolution IX	(Czech Republic) Martin Prokop	Mitsubishi Lancer Evolution IX	(Qatar) Nasser Al-Attiyah	Subaru Impreza WRX STI
2008	(Austria) Andreas Aigner	Mitsubishi Lancer Evolution IX	(Finland) Juho Hänninen	Mitsubishi Lancer Evolution IX	(Finland) Jari Ketomaa	Subaru Impreza WRX STI
2007	(Japan) Toshi Arai	Subaru Impreza WRX STI	(Argentina) Gabriel Pozzo	Mitsubishi Lancer Evolution IX	(United Kingdom) Mark Higgins	Mitsubishi Lancer Evolution IX
2006	(Qatar) Nasser Al-Attiyah	Subaru Impreza WRX STI	(Japan) Fumio Nutahara	Mitsubishi Lancer Evolution IX	(San Marino) Mirco Baldacci	Mitsubishi Lancer Evolution IX
2005	(Japan) Toshi Arai	Subaru Impreza WRX STI	(Qatar) Nasser Al-Attiyah	Subaru Impreza WRX STI	(Argentina) Marcos Ligato	Subaru Impreza WRX STI
2004	(United Kingdom) Niall McShea	Subaru Impreza WRX STI	(Japan) Toshi Arai	Subaru Impreza WRX STI	(Finland) Jani Paasonen	Mitsubishi Lancer Evolution VII
2003	(United Kingdom) Martin Rowe	Subaru Impreza WRX STI	(Japan) Toshi Arai	Subaru Impreza WRX STI	(Sweden) Stig Blomqvist	Subaru Impreza WRX STI
2002	(Malaysia) Karamjit Singh	Proton Pert	(Finland) Kristian Sohlberg	Mitsubishi Lancer Evolution VII	(Peru) Ramón Ferreyros	Mitsubishi Lancer Evolution VII
FIA Cup for Production Rally Drivers
2001	(Argentina) Gabriel Pozzo	Mitsubishi Lancer Evolution VI	(Uruguay) Gustavo Trelles	Mitsubishi Lancer Evolution VI	(Austria) Manfred Stohl	Mitsubishi Lancer Evolution VI
2000	(Austria) Manfred Stohl	Mitsubishi Lancer Evolution VI	(Uruguay) Gustavo Trelles	Mitsubishi Lancer Evolution VI	(Argentina) Gabriel Pozzo	Mitsubishi Lancer Evolution VI
1999	(Uruguay) Gustavo Trelles	Mitsubishi Lancer Evo V / Evo VI	(Oman) Hamed Al-Wahaibi	Mitsubishi Lancer Evo V / Evo VI	(Japan) Toshi Arai	Subaru Impreza WRX
1998	(Uruguay) Gustavo Trelles	Mitsubishi Lancer Evo IV / Evo V	(Austria) Manfred Stohl	Mitsubishi Lancer Evo III / Evo V	(Spain) Luís Climent	Mitsubishi Lancer Evo III / Evo IV / Proton Wira 4WD
1997	(Uruguay) Gustavo Trelles	Mitsubishi Lancer Evo III	(Spain) Luís Climent	Mitsubishi Lancer Evo III / Evo IV	(Austria) Manfred Stohl	Mitsubishi Lancer Evo III / Evo IV
1996	(Uruguay) Gustavo Trelles	Mitsubishi Lancer Evo III / Subaru Impreza WRX	(Germany) Uwe Nittel	Mitsubishi Lancer Evo III	(Belgium) Pascal Smets	Mitsubishi Lancer Evo III
1995	(Portugal) Rui Madeira	Mitsubishi Lancer Evo II	(Argentina) Jorge Recalde	Mitsubishi Lancer Evo II	(Germany) Isolde Holderied	Mitsubishi Lancer Evo II
1994	(Spain) Jesús Puras	Ford Escort RS Cosworth	(Germany) Isolde Holderied	Mitsubishi Lancer Evo I / Evo II	(Argentina) Jorge Recalde	Mitsubishi Lancer RS / Evo II
1993	(Italy) Alex Fassina	Mazda 323 GTR	(Portugal) António Coutinho	Ford Escort RS Cosworth	(Finland) Jarmo Kytölehto	Mitsubishi Galant VR-4
1992	(Belgium) Grégoire De Mévius	Nissan Sunny GTI-R	(Japan) Hiroshi Nishiyama	Nissan Sunny GTI-R	(Argentina) Carlos Menem, Jr.	Lancia Delta HF Integrale
1991	(Belgium) Grégoire De Mévius	Mazda 323 GTX	(Spain) Fernando Capdevila	Ford Sierra RS Cosworth 4x4	(Argentina) Carlos Menem, Jr.	Ford Sierra RS Cosworth 4x4
1991	(Belgium) Grégoire De Mévius	Mazda 323 GTX	(Spain) Fernando Capdevila	Ford Sierra RS Cosworth 4x4	(Italy) Piergiorgio Bedini	Lancia Delta Integrale 16V / Volkswagen Golf GTi 16V
1990	(France) Alain Oreille	Renault 5 GT Turbo	(Uruguay) Gustavo Trelles	Lancia Delta Integrale 16V	(Finland) Tommi Mäkinen	Mitsubishi Galant VR-4
1989	(France) Alain Oreille	Renault 5 GT Turbo	(Belgium) Grégoire De Mévius	Mazda 323 4WD	(Uruguay) Gustavo Trelles	Lancia Delta Integrale 16V
1988	(Belgium) Pascal Gaban	Mazda 323 4WD	(Argentina) Jorge Recalde	Lancia Delta Integrale	(Italy) Giovanni Del Zoppo	Lancia Delta Integrale
1987	(Italy) Alex Fiorio	Lancia Delta HF Integrale	(Sweden) Ove Olofsson	Lancia Delta HF 4WD / Audi Coupé Quattro	(France) Bertrand Balas	Lancia Delta HF 4WD
1987	(Italy) Alex Fiorio	Lancia Delta HF Integrale	(Sweden) Ove Olofsson	Lancia Delta HF 4WD / Audi Coupé Quattro	(Sweden) Sören Nilsson	Audi Coupé Quattro
1987	(Italy) Alex Fiorio	Lancia Delta HF Integrale	(Sweden) Ove Olofsson	Lancia Delta HF 4WD / Audi Coupé Quattro	(France) Claude Balesi	Renault 5 GT Turbo
1987	(Italy) Alex Fiorio	Lancia Delta HF Integrale	(Sweden) Ove Olofsson	Lancia Delta HF 4WD / Audi Coupé Quattro	(Greece) Evangelos Gallo	Toyota Corolla GT
1987	(Italy) Alex Fiorio	Lancia Delta HF Integrale	(Sweden) Ove Olofsson	Lancia Delta HF 4WD / Audi Coupé Quattro	(Finland) Fredrik Donner	Subaru RX Turbo
1987	(Italy) Alex Fiorio	Lancia Delta HF Integrale	(Sweden) Ove Olofsson	Lancia Delta HF 4WD / Audi Coupé Quattro	(Italy) Franco Cunico	Lancia Delta HF 4WD
1987	(Italy) Alex Fiorio	Lancia Delta HF Integrale	(Sweden) Ove Olofsson	Lancia Delta HF 4WD / Audi Coupé Quattro	(United Kingdom) George Donaldson	Ford Sierra RS Cosworth

== See also ==
- Junior World Rally Championship
- World Rally Championship-2
- World Rally Championship-3
