= Pentti Airikkala =

Finnish rally driver (1945–2009)

Personal information
- Nationality: (Finland) Finnish
- Full name: Pentti Juhani Airikkala
- Born: 4 September 1945; Helsinki, Finland
- Died: 30 September 2009 (aged 64); Bray, Berkshire, United Kingdom

World Rally Championship record
- Years active: 1973–1990, 2003
- Co-driver: (Finland) Heikki Haaksiala (United Kingdom) John Davenport (Finland) Risto Virtanen (United Kingdom) Mike Greasley (United Kingdom) Mike Nicholson (New Zealand) Rodger Freeth (New Zealand) Chris Porter (United Kingdom) Phil Short (Finland) Juha Piironen (Finland) Seppo Harjanne (Republic of Ireland) Ronan McNamee (Republic of Ireland) Brian Murphy (United Kingdom) Nigel Gardner
- Teams: Privateer, Vauxhall, Rothmans Ford, Mitsubishi Ralliart, Martini Lancia, Nissan, Q8 Team Ford
- Rallies: 37
- Championships: 0
- Rally wins: 1
- Podiums: 6
- Stage wins: 147
- Total points: 102
- First rally: 1973 1000 Lakes Rally
- First win: 1989 RAC Rally
- Last rally: 2003 Wales Rally GB

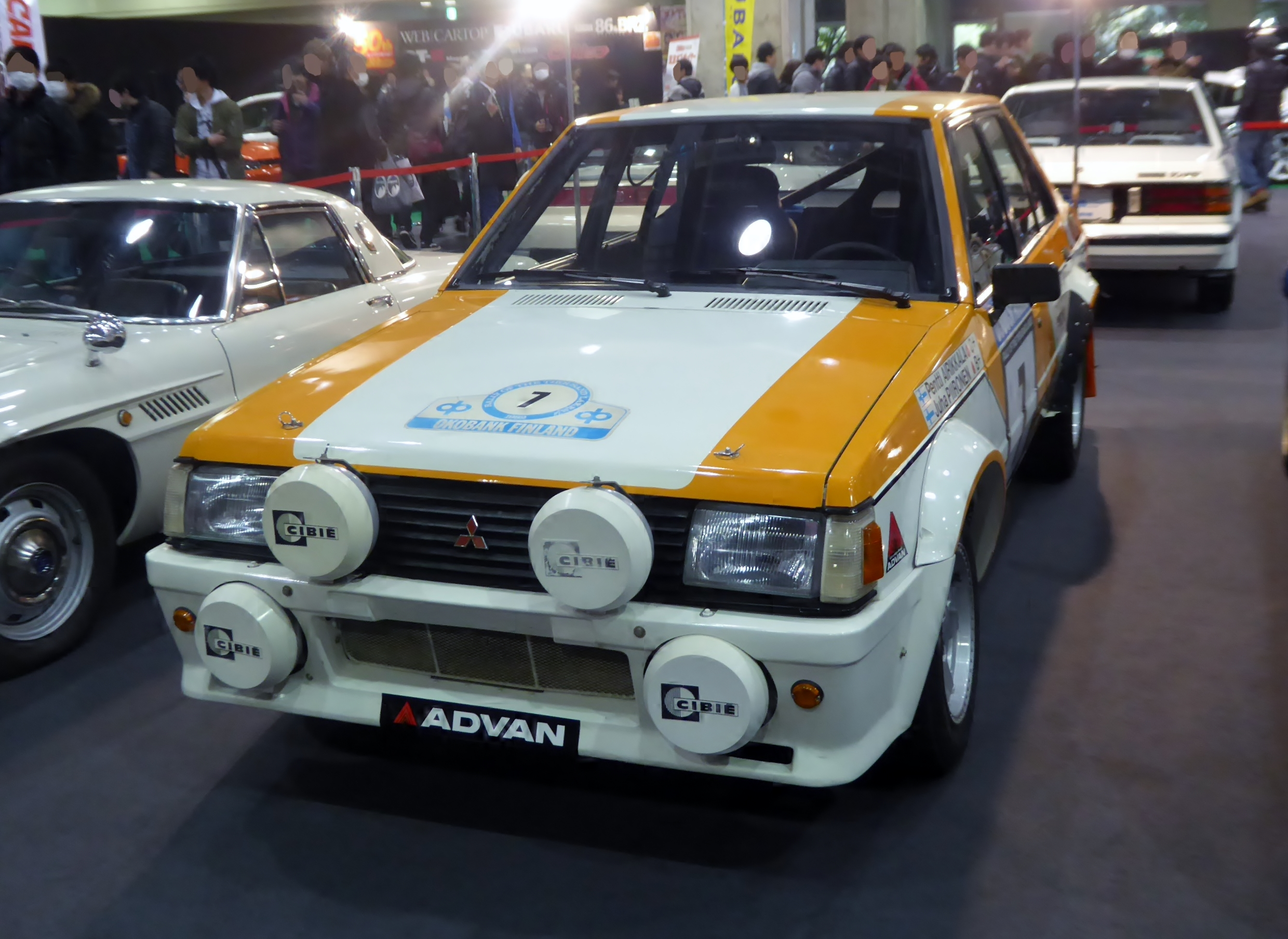
Airikkala's Team Ralliart-entered Mitsubishi Lancer 2000 Turbo from the 1982 1000 Lakes Rally.

Pentti Juhani Airikkala (4 September 1945 – 30 September 2009) was one of the "Flying Finns" who dominated world rallying in the past four decades. His career was more sporadic than many of his contemporaries, and he competed in only three World Rally Championship (WRC) events regularly; the two Scandinavian rallies (the 1000 Lakes and the Swedish Rally) and the RAC Rally in the United Kingdom.

Airikkala was born in Helsinki, Finland. Most of his top flight competitive experience was behind the wheel of various rear wheel drive Vauxhall/Opels like the Chevette HS and Magnum coupé, but his greatest success came in the twilight of his career, when he won the 1989 RAC Rally in a Group A Mitsubishi Galant VR-4. He is still the fourth oldest driver to win a WRC event.

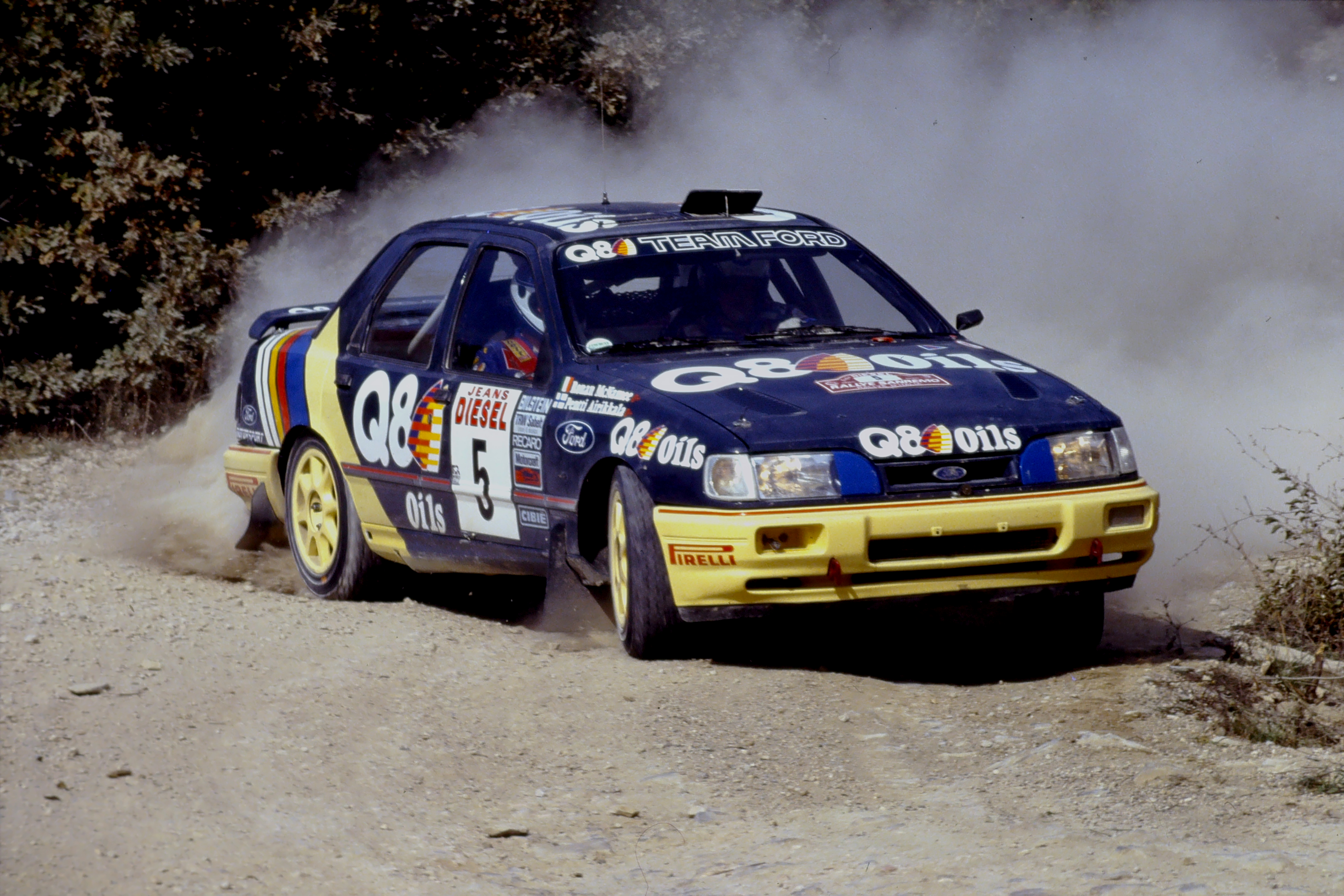
Airikkala/McNamee's Ford Sierra barely missed a Top10 finish at 1990 Sanremo rally.

Altogether he competed in 36 WRC events between 1973 and 1990, and a 37th in 2003, scoring 102 points and achieving a best of 9th overall in the 1981 Drivers' Championship. He also contested the British Rally Championship in the 1970s/80s, becoming British Rally Champion in 1979. Since retiring from full-time international competition he operated a highly successful rally driving school in Oxfordshire teaching left-foot braking, where his roster of pupils included subsequent World Champions Colin McRae and Richard Burns.

== Death ==
Airikkala died at Bray, Berkshire, UK, aged 64. He had been battling illness in recent years and was admitted to hospital shortly before his death after suffering liver problems and a fall.

== WRC victories ==
#	Event	Season	Co-driver	Car
1	(United Kingdom) 38th Lombard RAC Rally	1989	Ronan McNamee	Mitsubishi Galant VR-4

== Racing record ==
=== Complete IMC results ===
Year	Entrant	Car	1	2	3	4	5	6	7	8	9
1971	Opel Mobil Team	Opel Kadett Rallye	MON	SWE	ITA	KEN	MAR	AUT	GRE	FRA	GBR; Ret

=== Complete WRC results ===
Year	Entrant	Car	1	2	3	4	5	6	7	8	9	10	11	12	13	14	WDC	Pts
1973	Auto-Airikkala Oy	Opel Kadett GT/E	MON	SWE	POR	KEN	MOR	GRE	POL	FIN; Ret	AUT	ITA	USA	GBR	FRA		N/A	N/A
1974	Auto-Airikkala Oy	Vauxhall Magnum Coupé	POR	KEN	FIN; 16	ITA	CAN	USA									N/A	N/A
1974	Centre Hotels / Clarke & Simpson	Ford Escort RS1600							GBR; Ret	FRA							N/A	N/A
1975	Dealer Team Vauxhall	Vauxhall Magnum Coupé	MON	SWE	KEN	GRE	MOR	POR	FIN; Ret	ITA	FRA	GBR; 20					N/A	N/A
1976	Team Avon Tyres	Ford Escort RS1800	MON	SWE	POR	KEN	GRE	MOR	FIN; 2	ITA	FRA	GBR; DSQ					N/A	N/A
1977	Toyota Team Europe	Toyota Celica 2000 GT	MON	SWE; Ret	POR	KEN	NZL	GRE									N/A	N/A
1977	Dealer Team Vauxhall	Vauxhall Chevette 2300 HS							FIN; Ret	CAN	ITA	FRA	GBR; 16				N/A	N/A
1978	Dealer Team Vauxhall	Vauxhall Chevette 2300 HS	MON	SWE; Ret	KEN	POR; DNS	GRE	FIN; 3	CAN	ITA	CIV	FRA	GBR; Ret				N/A	N/A
1979	Dealer Team Vauxhall	Vauxhall Chevette 2300 HS	MON	SWE; 3	POR	KEN	GRE		FIN; Ret	CAN	ITA	FRA	GBR; 7	CIV			15th	16
1979	GM Dealer Team New Zealand	Vauxhall Chevette 2300 HS						NZL; Ret									15th	16
1980	Dealer Team Vauxhall	Vauxhall Chevette 2300 HSR	MON	SWE; 6	POR	KEN	GRC	ARG	FIN; Ret				GBR; Ret	CIV			36th	6
1980	Masport	Ford Escort RS1800								NZL; Ret	ITA	FRA					36th	6
1981	Rothmans Rally Team	Ford Escort RS1800	MON	SWE; 3	POR	KEN	FRA	GRC	ARG	BRA	FIN; 5	ITA	CIV	GBR; 4			9th	30
1982	Team Ralliart	Mitsubishi Lancer 2000 Turbo	MON	SWE	POR	KEN	FRA	GRC	NZL	BRA	FIN; 3	ITA	CIV	GBR; Ret			15th	12
1983	Martini Racing	Lancia Rally 037	MON	SWE	POR	KEN	FRA	GRC	NZL	ARG	FIN; 5	ITA	CIV	GBR			21st	8
1984	Team Nissan Europe	Nissan 240RS	MON	SWE	POR	KEN	FRA	GRE	NZL	ARG	FIN; Ret	ITA	CIV	GBR			NC	0
1985	British Telecom / GM Dealer Sport	Vauxhall Astra GTE	MON	SWE	POR	KEN	FRA	GRC	NZL	ARG	FIN	ITA	CIV	GBR; Ret			NC	0
1986	British Telecom / GM Dealer Sport	Vauxhall Astra GTE	MON	SWE	POR	KEN	FRA	GRE	NZL	ARG	FIN	CIV	ITA	GBR; 16	USA		NC	0
1987	GM Euro Sport	Opel Kadett GSi	MON	SWE	POR	KEN	FRA	GRE	USA	NZL	ARG	FIN	CIV	ITA	GBR; Ret		NC	0
1988	Safety Devices	Lancia Delta Integrale	MON	SWE	POR	KEN	FRA	GRC	USA	NZL	ARG	FIN	CIV	ITA	GBR; 4		30th	10
1989	Mitsubishi Ralliart Europe	Mitsubishi Galant VR-4	SWE	MON	POR	KEN	FRA	GRC	NZL	ARG	FIN	AUS	ITA	CIV	GBR; 1		14th	20
1990	Q8 Team Ford	Ford Sierra Cosworth 4X4	MON	POR	KEN	FRA	GRC	NZL	ARG	FIN; Ret	AUS	ITA; 11	CIV	GBR; Ret			NC	0
2003	Pentti Airikkala	Mitsubishi Lancer Evo VI	MON	SWE	TUR	NZL	ARG	GRC	CYP	GER	FIN	AUS	ITA	FRA	ESP	GBR; Ret	NC	0
