= Kenneth Eriksson =

Swedish rally driver (born 1956)

Personal information
- Nationality: (Sweden) Swedish
- Born: 13 May 1956 (age 70); Äppelbo

World Rally Championship record
- Years active: 1980 – 2002
- Co-driver: (Sweden) Lennart Larsson (Sweden) Sven-Erik Heinstedt (Sweden) Ragnar Spjuth (Sweden) Bo Thorszelius (West Germany) Peter Diekmann (Sweden) Staffan Parmander (Sweden) Tina Thörner
- Teams: Subaru, Mitsubishi, Hyundai, Škoda
- Rallies: 138
- Championships: 0
- Rally wins: 6
- Podiums: 21
- Stage wins: 214
- Total points: 489
- First rally: 1980 Swedish Rally
- First win: 1987 Rallye Côte d'Ivoire
- Last win: 1997 Rally New Zealand
- Last rally: 2002 Rally Great Britain

Kenneth Eriksson (born 13 May 1956 in Äppelbo, in the kommun of Vansbro) is a now retired World Rally Championship rally driver. He drove for several manufacturer teams, including the Subaru World Rally Team, Mitsubishi, Hyundai and Škoda. He also competed for the manufacturer Mitsubishi squad in the Cross-Country World Cup and Dakar events between 1991 and 1992, finishing fourth overall in '91. He was the 1986 Group A Champion in the competition's only year, his best performance, overshadowed by the fatalities that occurred in that season.

Eriksson's finest showing in the top-tier World Rally Championship was third place overall for Mitsubishi in 1995. He controversially won the Swedish Rally that year under pressure on the road from second-placed young teammate Tommi Mäkinen, as well as winning directly ahead of the Champion-elect, Subaru World Rally Team's Colin McRae in Australia. He then switched to Subaru for the 1996 season to drive the Impreza WRC alongside McRae. He excelled for them as a second points-scorer on the championship's loose-surface rounds. Conversely, Italian Piero Liatti often took on the same responsibility for asphalt rounds. By the end of the 1997 season, Eriksson and regular co-driver Staffan Parmander had collected six individual World Rally victories. These included a famous win aboard the Impreza in New Zealand in 1997, on which occasion he took advantage of the altercation with a sheep that befell long-time leader, Ford's Carlos Sainz. Between 1995 and 1997, he also notched up a hat-trick of Asia-Pacific rally titles.

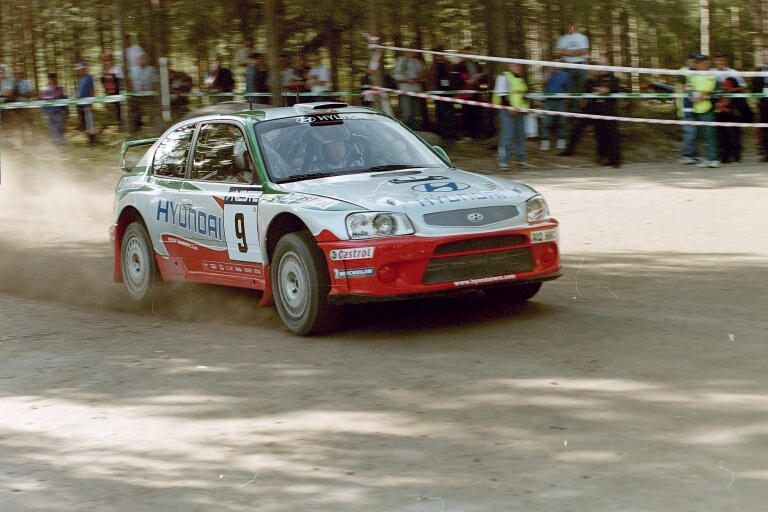
Eriksson with a Hyundai Accent WRC at the 2001 Rally Finland.

After finishing fourth on the 1998 Swedish Rally, Eriksson was released from his contract at Subaru in order to pursue a kit-car and latterly a World Rally Car chance with Hyundai. He was joined as factory driver of both the Hyundai Coupe and eventual Hyundai Accent WRC by fellow eventual one-time Subaru driver, Alister McRae. Sixth on the 2001 Rally Great Britain marked his solitary points finish for the team, on his last outing with them. He then enjoyed his final season with Škoda, in 2002, alongside navigator Tina Thörner in the light of Parmander's retirement and with his teammate in the sister Octavia WRC being the young Finn Toni Gardemeister.

Eriksson departed the 'works' world rally scene at the end of 2002. He has since been competing in the Race to the Sky hillclimb event held in Cardrona Valley, New Zealand. He finished second in 2005, 2006 and 2007.

== WRC victories ==
| # | Event | Season | Co-driver | Car |
|---|---|---|---|---|
| 1 | (Ivory Coast) 19ème Rallye Côte d'Ivoire | 1987 | Peter Diekmann | Volkswagen Golf GTI 16V |
| 2 | (Sweden) 40th International Swedish Rally | 1991 | Staffan Parmander | Mitsubishi Galant VR-4 |
| 3 | (Sweden) 44th International Swedish Rally | 1995 | Staffan Parmander | Mitsubishi Lancer Evolution II |
| 4 | 8th Telstra Rally Australia | 1995 | Staffan Parmander | Mitsubishi Lancer Evolution III |
| 5 | (Sweden) 46th International Swedish Rally | 1997 | Staffan Parmander | Subaru Impreza WRC 97 |
| 6 | 27th Smokefree Rally New Zealand | 1997 | Staffan Parmander | Subaru Impreza WRC 97 |

== WRC results ==
| Year | Entrant | Car | 1 | 2 | 3 | 4 | 5 | 6 | 7 | 8 | 9 | 10 | 11 | 12 | 13 | 14 | WDC | Points |
|---|---|---|---|---|---|---|---|---|---|---|---|---|---|---|---|---|---|---|
| 1980 | Kenneth Eriksson | Saab 96 V4 | MON | SWE; 51 | POR | KEN | GRC | ARG | FIN | NZL | ITA | FRA | GBR | CIV | | | - | 0 |
| 1981 | Kenneth Eriksson | Saab 96 V4 | MON | SWE; 31 | POR | KEN | FRA | GRC | ARG | BRA | FIN | ITA | CIV | GBR | | | - | 0 |
| 1982 | Kenneth Eriksson | Saab 96 V4 | MON | SWE; 15 | POR | KEN | FRA | GRC | NZL | BRA | FIN | ITA | CIV | GBR | | | - | 0 |
| 1983 | Kenneth Eriksson | Opel Ascona 400 | MON | SWE; 16 | POR | KEN | FRA | GRC | NZL | ARG | FIN | ITA | CIV | GBR | | | - | 0 |
| 1984 | Opel Team Sweden | Opel Kadett GT/E | MON | SWE; 7 | POR | KEN | FRA | GRC | NZL | ARG | FIN | ITA | CIV | | | | 36th | 4 |
| 1984 | Kenneth Eriksson | Opel Kadett GSI | | | | | | | | | | | | GBR; Ret | | | 36th | 4 |
| 1985 | Opel Team Sweden | Opel Kadett GSi | MON | SWE; 10 | POR | KEN | FRA | GRC | NZL | ARG | FIN | ITA | CIV | GBR | | | 68th | 1 |
| 1986 | Volkswagen Motorsport | Volkswagen Golf GTi 16V | MON; 9 | SWE; 7 | POR; Ret | KEN; Ret | FRA; 8 | GRC; 7 | NZL; 7 | ARG; 5 | FIN; 12 | CIV | ITA; 5* | GBR; 11 | USA | | 10th | 25 |
| 1987 | Volkswagen Motorsport | Volkswagen Golf GTi 16V | MON; 5 | SWE; 8 | POR; 3 | KEN; Ret | FRA; Ret | GRC; Ret | USA | NZL; 2 | ARG; 4 | FIN | CIV; 1 | ITA | GBR; 9 | | 4th | 70 |
| 1988 | Toyota Team Europe | Toyota Supra Turbo | MON | SWE | POR | KEN; 4 | | | | | | | | | | | 12th | 22 |
| 1988 | Toyota Team Europe | Toyota Celica GT-Four ST165 | | | | | FRA; 6 | GRC | USA | NZL | ARG | FIN; Ret | CIV | ITA; 6 | GBR; Ret | | 12th | 22 |
| 1989 | Toyota Team Europe | Toyota Celica GT-Four ST165 | SWE; 3 | MON | POR | KEN | FRA | GRC; Ret | NZL | ARG | FIN; 4 | AUS; 2 | ITA | CIV | GBR; 4 | | 6th | 47 |
| 1990 | Mitsubishi Ralliart Europe | Mitsubishi Galant VR-4 | MON; Ret | POR; Ret | KEN | FRA | GRC; Ret | NZL | ARG | FIN; 3 | AUS; Ret | ITA | CIV | GBR; 2 | | | 8th | 27 |
| 1991 | Mitsubishi Ralliart Europe | Mitsubishi Galant VR-4 | MON; Ret | SWE; 1 | POR | KEN | FRA | GRC; 7 | NZL | ARG | FIN; 3 | AUS; 2 | ITA | CIV | ESP | GBR; 2 | 5th | 66 |
| 1992 | Mitsubishi Ralliart Europe | Mitsubishi Galant VR-4 | MON; Ret | SWE | POR; Ret | KEN | FRA | GRC; Ret | NZL | ARG | FIN | AUS | ITA | CIV | ESP | GBR; 7 | 41st | 4 |
| 1993 | Mitsubishi Ralliart | Mitsubishi Lancer RS | MON; 4 | SWE | POR; 5 | KEN | FRA | GRC; Ret | ARG | NZL | FIN; 5 | AUS | ITA | ESP | GBR; 2 | | 6th | 41 |
| 1994 | Mitsubishi Ralliart | Mitsubishi Lancer RS | MON; 5 | POR | KEN | FRA | | | | | | | | | | | 12th | 18 |
| 1994 | Mitsubishi Ralliart | Mitsubishi Lancer Evo II | | | | | GRC; Ret | ARG | NZL; 4 | FIN | ITA | GBR | | | | | 12th | 18 |
| 1995 | Mitsubishi Ralliart | Mitsubishi Lancer Evo II | MON | SWE; 1 | POR | FRA | | | | | | | | | | | 3rd | 48 |
| 1995 | Mitsubishi Ralliart | Mitsubishi Lancer Evo III | | | | | NZL; 5 | AUS; 1 | ESP | GBR; Ret | | | | | | | 3rd | 48 |
| 1996 | 555 Subaru WRT | Subaru Impreza 555 | SWE; 5 | KEN; 2 | IDN; Ret | GRC; 5 | ARG; 3 | FIN; 5 | AUS; 2 | ITA; 5 | ESP; 7 | | | | | | 4th | 78 |
| 1997 | 555 Subaru WRT | Subaru Impreza WRC'97 | MON | SWE; 1 | KEN; Ret | POR; Ret | ESP | FRA | ARG; 3 | GRC; Ret | NZL; 1 | FIN; Ret | IDN; 3 | ITA | AUS; Ret | GBR; Ret | 5th | 28 |
| 1998 | 555 Subaru WRT | Subaru Impreza WRC'97 | MON | SWE; 4 | KEN | | | | | | | | | | | | 14th | 3 |
| 1998 | Hyundai Motor Sport | Hyundai Coupé Kit Car | | | | POR; Ret | ESP; 21 | FRA | ARG; Ret | GRC; Ret | | | | | | | 14th | 3 |
| 1998 | Hyundai Motor Sport | Hyundai Coupe Kit Car Evo2 | | | | | | | | | NZL; 20 | FIN; Ret | ITA; Ret | AUS; 22 | GBR; Ret | | 14th | 3 |
| 1999 | Hyundai Motor Sport | Hyundai Coupe Kit Car Evo2 | MON | SWE; Ret | KEN | POR; 14 | ESP; Ret | FRA | ARG | GRC; 15 | NZL; 17 | FIN; Ret | CHN; 11 | ITA; Ret | AUS; 9 | GBR; 25 | - | 0 |
| 2000 | Hyundai Castrol WRT | Hyundai Accent WRC | MON | SWE; 13 | KEN | POR; Ret | ESP; 23 | ARG; 8 | GRC; Ret | NZL; 5 | FIN; 15 | CYP | FRA; Ret | ITA; 45 | AUS; 4 | GBR; Ret | 11th | 5 |
| 2001 | Hyundai Castrol WRT | Hyundai Accent WRC | MON | SWE; 8 | | | | | | | | | | | | | 21st | 1 |
| 2001 | Hyundai Castrol WRT | Hyundai Accent WRC2 | | | POR; 7 | ESP | ARG; Ret | CYP; Ret | GRC; Ret | KEN | FIN; 12 | NZL; 10 | ITA | FRA | AUS; 12 | GBR; 6 | 21st | 1 |
| 2002 | Škoda Motorsport | Škoda Octavia WRC Evo2 | MON; 13 | SWE; Ret | FRA; Ret | ESP; 17 | CYP; 9 | ARG; 6 | GRE; 14 | KEN; Ret | | | | | | | 18th | 1 |
| 2002 | Škoda Motorsport | Škoda Octavia WRC Evo3 | | | | | | | | | FIN; Ret | GER; 10 | ITA; 11 | NZL; Ret | AUS; 8 | GBR; 13 | 18th | 1 |

Sporting positions
| Preceded by Inaugural event | Race of Champions; Rally Master; 1990 | Succeeded by Josep Maria Bardolet |
| Preceded by Possum Bourne | Winner of the Asia-Pacific Rally Championship; 1995, 1996 & 1997 | Succeeded by Yoshio Fujimoto |
