= Alain Oreille =

French rally driver (born 1953)

Personal information
- Nationality: (France) French
- Born: 22 April 1953 (age 73)

World Rally Championship record
- Years active: 1984 – 1995
- Co-driver: (France) Sylvie Oreille (France) Jean-Marc Andrié (France) Gilles Thimonier (France) Michel Roissard (France) Jack Boyère
- Teams: Renault
- Rallies: 28
- Championships: 0
- Rally wins: 1
- Podiums: 2
- Stage wins: 0
- Total points: 68
- First rally: 1984 Tour de Corse
- First win: 1989 Rallye Côte d'Ivoire
- Last rally: 1995 RAC Rally

Alain Oreille (born 22 April 1953 in Sarre-Union) is a former French rally driver, who won the Rallye Côte d'Ivoire in 1989, a round of the World Rally Championship. He won the FIA Cup for Drivers of Production Cars in 1989 and 1990.

== Career ==
Oreille's first race was a 24-hour endurance race at Paul Ricard in 1974, where he raced his own Simca Rallye 2. He worked full time as a mason to finance his racing, but his race winnings were enough to invest in a rally-prepped Opel Kadett GT/E at the end of 1980. From an underdog position Oreille managed to win the French Trophée Opel (Opel Trophy) in 1983, the last year in which it was contested. After this Oreille signed up with the Budget Marseille racing team, which is how he ended up in his first Renaults, an R5 Alpine Turbo and soon thereafter an R11 Turbo. He finished fifth in the national championship in his first year. Until 1987, his wife Sylvie acted as his navigator. In 1985 he won the Group N class at the Rallye Monte Carlo in an R11 Turbo.

In 1986 he won the Group A category at Monte Carlo, again in an R11 Turbo. This was enough for an eighth position in the overall standings. In 1988 Group B was no more, and Oreille's fourth place in his group in Monte Carlo was also fourth overall. Oreille went on to win the Group N world championships in both 1989 and 1990, both times in an R5 GT Turbo for the Diac-Simon Racing Team. In 1989 Gilles Thimonier was his navigator, in 1990 Michel Roissard.

Oreille drove Renaults for most of his professional career, including all 28 of his WRC starts. He took back-to-back wins in the FIA Cup for Drivers of Production Cars in 1989 and 1990 in a Group N Renault 5 GT Turbo. By winning the Rallye Côte d'Ivoire in 1989 he became the first and only driver to win a WRC round in a Group N car.

== WRC victories ==
#	Event	Season	Co-driver	Car
1	(Ivory Coast) 21ème Rallye Côte d'Ivoire	1989	Gilles Thimonier	Renault 5 GT Turbo
