= Rallye Côte d'Ivoire =

Rally Sport

The Rallye Côte d'Ivoire, perhaps better known as the Rallye Bandama as it was originally called, or the Ivory Coast Rally, is a rally race held annually in Ivory Coast in Africa. In common with other races on the continent, it is known for its arduous conditions and high attrition rate among competitors; the chances of finishing were 1 out of 10 and in 1972, 45 cars started, and no cars finished. It was part of the World Rally Championship for drivers and manufacturers from 1978 to 1981, and part of the drivers' championship only in 1977 and from 1982 to 1992. In 2006, the event was part of the African Rally Championship, but was dropped for the 2007 season due to reports by observers.

The 2010 event was cancelled due to the political situation in the country.

== Winners ==
Year	Event	Winner(s)	Vehicle
1969	1er Rallye Bandama	(France) Marc Gérenthon (France) Hélène Gérenthon	Renault 8 Gordini
1970	2ème Rallye Bandama	(West Germany) Hans Schuller (France) Grassiot	Datsun 1600 SSS
1971	3ème Rallye Bandama	(France) Robert Neyret (France) Jacques Terramorsi	Peugeot 504
1972	4ème Rallye Bandama	no finishers	
1973	5ème Rallye Bandama	(Kenya) Edgar Herrmann (West Germany) Hans Schuller	Datsun 180B SSS
1974	6ème Rallye Bandama	(Finland) Timo Mäkinen (United Kingdom) Henry Liddon	Peugeot 504
1975	7ème Rallye Bandama	(France) Bernard Consten (France) Flocon	Peugeot 504
1976	8ème Rallye Bandama	(Finland) Timo Mäkinen (United Kingdom) Henry Liddon	Peugeot 504 V6
1977	9ème Rallye Bandama Côte d'Ivoire	(United Kingdom) Andrew Cowan (United Kingdom) Johnstone Syer	Mitsubishi/Colt Lancer 1600 GSR
1978	10ème Rallye Bandama Côte d'Ivoire	(France) Jean-Pierre Nicolas (France) Michel Gamet	Peugeot 504 V6 Coupé
1979	11ème Rallye Côte d'Ivoire	(Finland) Hannu Mikkola (Sweden) Arne Hertz	Mercedes 450 SLC 5.0
1980	12ème Rallye "Marlboro" Côte d'Ivoire	(Sweden) Björn Waldegård (Sweden) Hans Thorszelius	Mercedes 500 SLC
1981	13ème Rallye "Marlboro" Côte d'Ivoire	(Finland) Timo Salonen (Finland) Seppo Harjanne	Datsun Violet GT
1982	14ème Rallye "Marlboro" Côte d'Ivoire	(West Germany) Walter Röhrl (West Germany) Christian Geistdörfer	Opel Ascona 400
1983	15ème Rallye "Marlboro" Côte d'Ivoire	(Sweden) Björn Waldegård (Sweden) Hans Thorszelius	Toyota Celica TCT
1984	16ème Rallye "Marlboro" Côte d'Ivoire	(Sweden) Stig Blomqvist (Sweden) Björn Cederberg	Audi Sport Quattro
1985	17ème Rallye "Marlboro" Côte d'Ivoire	(Finland) Juha Kankkunen (United Kingdom) Fred Gallagher	Toyota Celica TCT
1986	18ème Rallye "Marlboro" Côte d'Ivoire	(Sweden) Björn Waldegård (United Kingdom) Fred Gallagher	Toyota Celica TCT
1987	19ème Rallye "Marlboro" Côte d'Ivoire	(Sweden) Kenneth Eriksson (West Germany) Peter Diekmann	Volkswagen Golf GTI 16V
1988	20ème Rallye "Marlboro" Côte d'Ivoire	(Ivory Coast) Alain Ambrosino (Ivory Coast) Daniel Le Saux	Nissan 200SX
1989	21ème Rallye "Marlboro" Côte d'Ivoire	(France) Alain Oreille (France) Gilles Thimonier	Renault 5 GT Turbo
1990	22ème Rallye "Viking" Côte d'Ivoire Bandama	(Ivory Coast) Patrick Tauziac (France) Claude Papin	Mitsubishi Galant VR-4
1991	23ème Rallye "Viking" Côte d'Ivoire Bandama	(Japan) Kenjiro Shinozuka (United Kingdom) John Meadows	Mitsubishi Galant VR-4
1992	24ème Rallye "Viking" Côte d'Ivoire Bandama	(Japan) Kenjiro Shinozuka (United Kingdom) John Meadows	Mitsubishi Galant VR-4
1993	25ème Rallye Côte d'Ivoire Bandama	(France) Patrice Servant (France) Thierry Brion	Audi Quattro S2
1994	26ème Rallye Côte d'Ivoire Bandama	(France) Patrice Servant (France) Thierry Brion	Audi Quattro S2
1995	not held		
1996	27ème Rallye "Marlboro" Côte d'Ivoire	(Ivory Coast) Alain Ambrosino (France) Alain Florentin	Mitsubishi Lancer Evolution III
1997	28ème Rallye Côte d'Ivoire Bandama	(Ivory Coast) Alain Ambrosino (France) Alain Florentin	Mitsubishi Lancer Evolution III
1998	29ème Rallye Côte d'Ivoire Bandama	(France) Patrice Servant (France) Alain Florentin	Peugeot 106
1999	30ème Rallye Côte d'Ivoire Bandama	(France) Marc Molinié (France) Christian Tribout	Toyota Celica GT-Four ST205
2000	not held		
2001	31ème Rallye Côte d'Ivoire Bandama	(Belgium) Tom Colsoul (Belgium) Bob Colsoul	Mitsubishi Lancer Evolution VI
2002	not held		
2003	32ème Rallye Côte d'Ivoire Bandama	(Ivory Coast) Fané Bakary (Ivory Coast) Konan Clément	Subaru Impreza WRX
2004	not held		
2005	33ème Rallye Côte d'Ivoire Bandama	(Ivory Coast) Fané Bakary (Ivory Coast) Konan Clément	Subaru Impreza WRX
2006	34ème Rallye Côte d'Ivoire Bandama	(Belgium) Patrick Emontspool (Belgium) Alain Robert	Subaru Impreza WRX
2007– 2008	not held		
2009	35ème Rallye Côte d'Ivoire Bandama	(Ivory Coast) Moriféré Soumaoro (France) Philippe Garcia	Mitsubishi Lancer Evolution IX
2010	36ème Rallye Côte d'Ivoire Bandama	event cancelled	
2011	37ème Rallye Côte d'Ivoire Bandama	(Ivory Coast) Moriféré Soumaoro (France) Philippe Garcia	Mitsubishi Lancer Evolution IX
2012	38ème Rallye Côte d'Ivoire Bandama	(Ivory Coast) Moriféré Soumaoro (France) Philippe Garcia	Mitsubishi Lancer Evolution IX
2013	39ème Rallye Côte d'Ivoire Bandama	(Ivory Coast) Bakary Fane (Ivory Coast) Moussa Fane	Subaru Impreza WRX STi
2014	40ème Rallye Côte d'Ivoire Bandama	(Ivory Coast) Gary Chaynes (Ivory Coast) Romain Comas	Mitsubishi Lancer Evolution IX
2015	41ème Rallye Côte d'Ivoire Bandama	(Ivory Coast) Gary Chaynes (Belgium) David Israel	Mitsubishi Lancer Evolution IX
2016	42ème Rallye Côte d'Ivoire Bandama	(Ivory Coast) Gary Chaynes (Belgium) David Israel	Mitsubishi Lancer Evolution IX
2017	43ème Rallye Côte d'Ivoire Bandama	(Ivory Coast) Moriféré Soumaoro (Ivory Coast) Romain Comas	Mitsubishi Lancer Evolution X
2018	44ème Rallye Côte d'Ivoire Bandama	(Ivory Coast) Gary Chaynes (France) Didier Le Borgne	Mitsubishi Lancer Evolution X
2019	45ème Rallye Côte d’Ivoire Bandama	(Kenya) Manvir Baryan (Scotland) Drew Sturrock	Škoda Fabia R5
2020	46ème Rallye Côte d’Ivoire Bandama	(Ivory Coast) Gary Chaynes (Ivory Coast) Romain Comas	Mitsubishi Lancer Evolution X
2021	47ème Rallye Côte d’Ivoire Bandama	(Ivory Coast) Gary Chaynes (Ivory Coast) Romain Comas	Mitsubishi Lancer Evolution IX
2022	48ème Rallye Côte d’Ivoire Bandama	(Zambia) Leroy Gomes (Zambia) Urshlla Gomes	Mitsubishi Lancer Evolution IX
2023	49ème Rallye Côte d’Ivoire Bandama	(Ivory Coast) Gary Chaynes (Ivory Coast) Romain Comas	Mitsubishi Lancer Evolution X
2024	50ème Rallye Côte d’Ivoire Bandama	(Ivory Coast) Gary Chaynes (Ivory Coast) Romain Comas	Citroën C3 Rally2
