= Mikael Ericsson =

Swedish rally driver (born 1960)

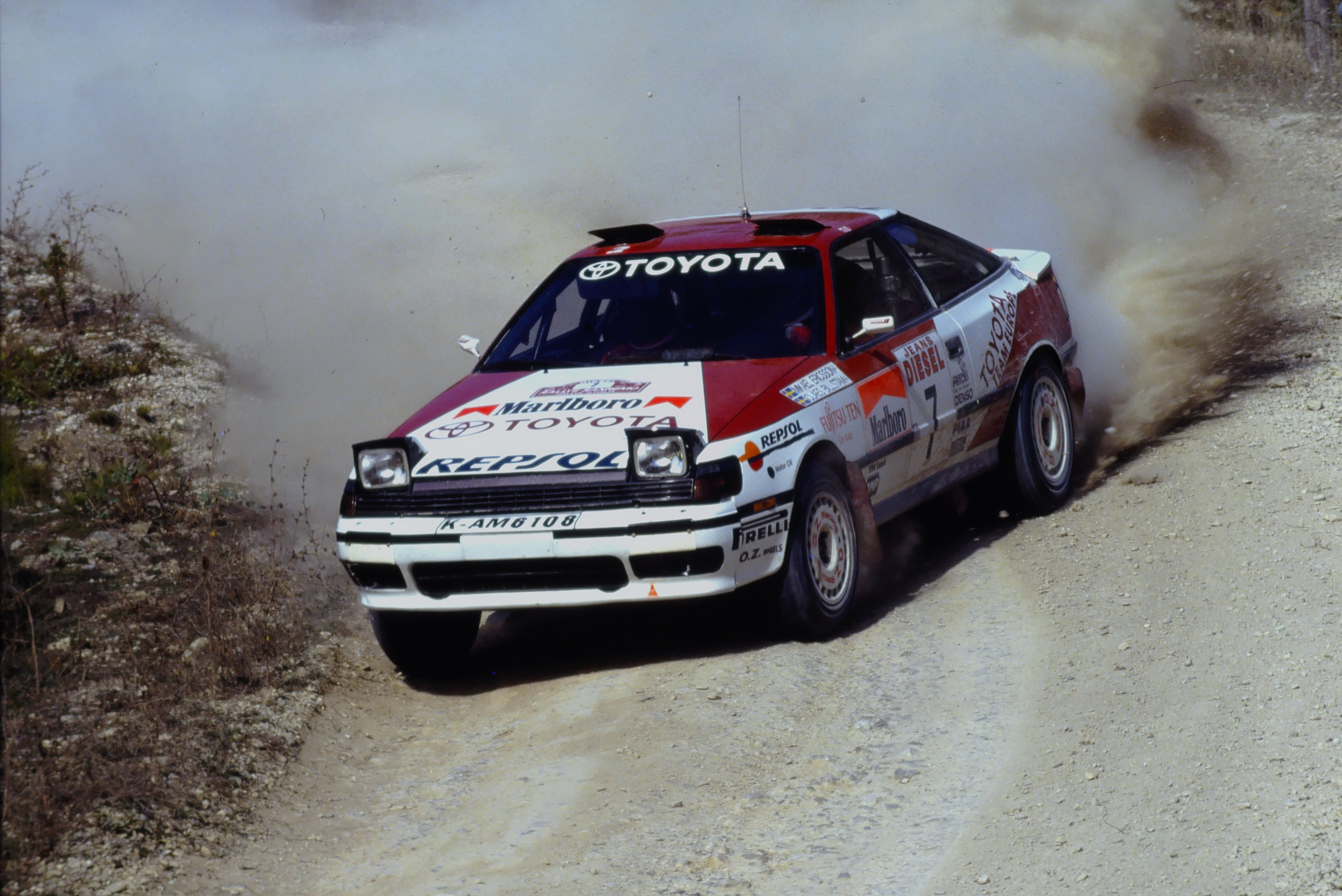
- Ericsson and co-driver Claes Billstam on Toyota Celica GT-Four at the Sanremo Rally of 1990, they claimed 6th place overall

Personal information
- Nationality: (Sweden) Swedish
- Born: 28 February 1960 (age 66)

World Rally Championship record
- Years active: 1981–1993
- Co-driver: (Sweden) Hans Bonnedahl (Sweden) Jan Sandström (Sweden) Bo Thorszelius (Sweden) Rolf Melleroth (Sweden) Claes Billstam (Sweden) Johnny Johansson (West Germany) Reinhard Michel (United Kingdom) Nicky Grist (Sweden) Tina Thörner
- Teams: Volkswagen, Audi, Lancia, Nissan, Mitsubishi, Toyota, Ford
- Rallies: 40
- Rally wins: 2
- Podiums: 7
- Total points: 230
- First rally: 31st International Swedish Rally, 1981
- Last rally: 42nd International Swedish Rally, 1993

Mikael Ericsson (born 28 February 1960) is a Swedish former rally driver. During his career he competed in 40 events in the World Rally Championship, including two victories consecutively in 1989, his best year, when he finished fourth overall.

== WRC victories ==
#	Event	Season	Co-driver	Car
1	9º Rally Argentina	1989	Claes Billstam	Lancia Delta Integrale
2	(Finland) 39th 1000 Lakes Rally	1989	Claes Billstam	Mitsubishi Galant VR-4

== WRC results ==
Year	Entrant	Car	1	2	3	4	5	6	7	8	9	10	11	12	13	14	WDC	Points
1981	Mikael Ericsson	Volkswagen Golf GTi	MON	SWE; 28	POR	KEN	FRA	GRC	ARG	BRA	FIN	ITA	CIV	GBR			-	0
1982	Mikael Ericsson	Audi Coupé	MON	SWE; 10	POR	KEN	FRA	GRC	NZL	BRA	FIN	ITA	CIV				66th	1
1982	Audi Sport Sweden	Audi Coupé Quattro												GBR; 21			66th	1
1983	Audi Sweden	Audi 80 Quattro	MON	SWE; 8	POR	KEN	FRA	GRC	ARG	BRA	FIN; Ret	ITA	CIV	GBR			41st	3
1984	Mikael Ericsson	Audi 80 Quattro	MON	SWE; Ret	POR	KEN	FRA	GRC	ARG	BRA	FIN; Ret	ITA	CIV	GBR; 10			62nd	1
1985	Mikael Ericsson	Audi 80 Quattro	MON	SWE; 7	POR	KEN	FRA	GRC	NZL	ARG				GBR; Ret			33rd	7
1985	Blue Rose Team	Audi 80 Quattro									FIN; 8	ITA	CIV				33rd	7
1986	Audi Sport	Audi 90 Quattro	MON	SWE; 4	POR	KEN	FRA										8th	28
1986	Martini Lancia	Lancia Delta S4						GRC; Ret	NZL; 4	ARG	FIN; 5	CIV	ITA	GBR; Ret	USA		8th	28
1987	Martini Lancia	Lancia Delta HF 4WD	MON	SWE; 2	POR	KEN	FRA								GBR; 4		10th	28
1987	Jolly Club	Lancia Delta HF 4WD						GRC; Ret									10th	28
1987	Nissan Motorsports International	Nissan 200SX							USA; Ret	NZL	ARG	FIN	CIV				10th	28
1987	Jolly Club Totip	Lancia Delta HF 4WD												ITA; 8			10th	28
1988	Martini Lancia	Lancia Delta HF 4WD	MON	SWE; Ret													8th	30
1988	Martini Lancia	Lancia Delta Integrale			POR; Ret	KEN	FRA	GRC; 2	USA	NZL	ARG	FIN; 2	CIV	ITA	GBR; Ret		8th	30
1989	Astra Team Italia	Lancia Delta Integrale	SWE; 4	MON	POR	KEN	FRA	GRC	NZL								4th	50
1989	Martini Lancia	Lancia Delta Integrale								ARG; 1							4th	50
1989	Mitsubishi Ralliart Europe	Mitsubishi Galant VR-4									FIN; 1	AUS	ITA	CIV	GBR		4th	50
1990	Toyota Team Europe	Toyota Celica GT-Four	MON; 7	POR		FRA	GRC; 4	NZL	ARG	FIN; Ret	AUS; Ret	ITA; 6	CIV	GBR			5th	32
1990	Toyota Team Kenya	Toyota Celica GT-Four			KEN; 3												5th	32
1991	Toyota Kenya	Toyota Celica GT-Four	MON	SWE	POR	KEN; 2	FRA										10th	27
1991	Toyota Team Europe	Toyota Celica GT-Four						GRC; 6	NZL	ARG; 6	FIN	AUS	ITA	CIV	ESP	GBR	10th	27
1992	Toyota Kenya	Toyota Celica Turbo 4WD	MON	SWE	POR	KEN; 4	FRA	GRC	NZL	ARG	FIN	AUS	ITA	CIV	ESP	GBR	25th	10
1993	Ford Motor Co Ltd	Ford Escort RS Cosworth	MON	SWE; Ret	POR	KEN	FRA	GRC	ARG	NZL	FIN	AUS	ITA	ESP	GBR		-	0
