= Patrick Tauziac =

French rally driver (born 1955)

Patrick Tauziac.
Personal information
- Nationality: (France) French
- Born: January 18, 1955 (age 71); Saigon, Vietnam

World Rally Championship record
- Years active: 1984 – 1992
- Co-driver: (Ivory Coast) Lois Cournil (France) Alain Olinger (France) Claude Papin (France) Christian Boy
- Teams: Mitsubishi Ralliart
- Rallies: 9
- Championships: 0
- Rally wins: 1
- Podiums: 4
- Stage wins: 2
- Total points: 78
- First rally: 1984 Rallye Côte d'Ivoire
- First win: 1990 Rallye Côte d'Ivoire
- Last rally: 1992 Rallye Côte d'Ivoire

Patrick Tauziac (born 18 January 1955, in Saigon, Vietnam) is a French former rally driver. Tauziac competed in the Rallye Côte d'Ivoire nine times as a World Rally Championship event, winning it in 1990.

== Career ==
Born in Saigon, Tauziac left Vietnam at the age of two to spend his entire childhood in Madagascar. At the age of 20 he went to France for four years before moving to the Côte d'Ivoire.

After getting into rallying, Tauziac first entered the country's World Rally Championship round in 1984, and finished sixth in a Mitsubishi Colt. As the rally was only a round of the World Drivers' Championship and not the Manufacturers' Championship, it was not well supported by the factory teams. Tauziac finished the rally third in 1988 and second in 1989 before winning it in 1990.

== WRC victories ==
#	Event	Season	Co-driver	Car
1	(Ivory Coast) 22ème Rallye Côte d'Ivoire	1990	Claude Papin	Mitsubishi Galant VR-4
