= Mitsubishi Galant VR-4 =

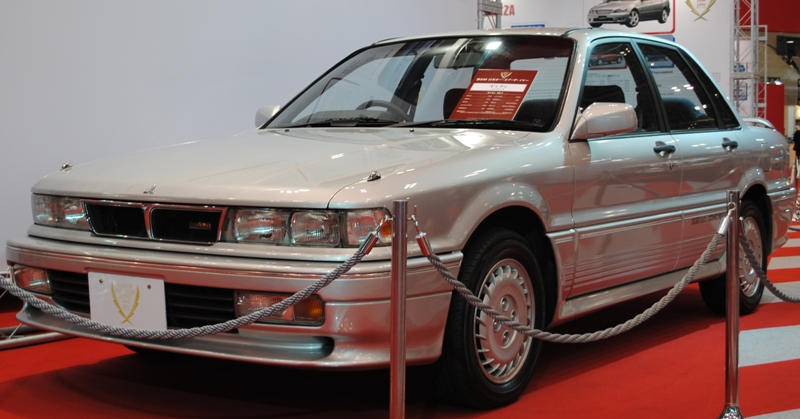
- A first generation Mitsubishi Galant VR-4 on display at the Tokyo Motor Show in 2009

Overview
- Manufacturer: Mitsubishi Motors
- Production: 1987–2002
- Assembly: Okazaki, Aichi (Nagoya Plant)

Body and chassis
- Class: Sport compact (1987–1992); Mid-size car (1992–2002)
- Body style: 4-door sedan 5-door liftback (1987–1996); 5-door station wagon (1996–2002)
- Layout: Front-engine, all-wheel drive
- Related: Mitsubishi Galant

Chronology
- Successor: Mitsubishi Lancer Evolution (sport compact)

The Mitsubishi Galant VR-4 (Viscous Realtime 4WD) was the range-topping version of Mitsubishi Motors' Galant, which lasted for three generations, corresponding to the sixth (1987–1992), seventh (1992–1996) and eighth (1996–2002) generations of the original Galant model. Originally introduced to comply with the new Group A regulations of the World Rally Championship, it was soon superseded as Mitsubishi's competition vehicle by the Lancer Evolution, and subsequently developed into a high-performance showcase of the company's technology.

== Background and competition history ==
Throughout the 1970s and 1980s, Mitsubishi Motors Corporation (MMC) sought to improve its image through the established path of participation in motorsport. The Lancer 1600 GSR and Pajero/Montero/Shogun both achieved great success in rallying and rally raid events, and eventually the company planned an attempt on the Group B class of the World Rally Championship with a four-wheel drive version of its Starion coupé. However, the class was outlawed following several fatal accidents in 1985 and '86, and Mitsubishi was forced to reassess its approach. It instead homologated the recently introduced sixth generation of its Galant sedan for the Group A class, using the mechanical underpinnings from its aborted Starion prototype. Between 1988 and '92, it was campaigned by the official factory outfit, Mitsubishi Ralliart Europe, winning three events in the hands of Mikael Ericsson (1989 1000 Lakes Rally), Pentti Airikkala (1989 Lombard RAC Rally) and Kenneth Eriksson (1991 Swedish Rally). It was also driven to outright victory in the Asia-Pacific Rally Championships by Kenjiro Shinozuka (1988) and Ross Dunkerton (1991–92), and the American National GT Championship (1992) by Tim O'Neil.

However, Mitsubishi — and their competitors — realised that the WRC cars of the '80s were simply too big and ungainly for the tight, winding roads of rally stages. Sometime around 1992, Ford migrated the Sierra/Sapphire Cosworth to a smaller Escort-based bodyshell; Subaru developed the Impreza to succeed their Legacy; and Toyota eventually replaced the Celica coupe with the Corolla. Mitsubishi, meanwhile, carried the VR-4's engine/transmission over to the new Lancer Evolution, bringing to an end the Galant's representation in MMC's motorsport efforts.

=== WRC victories ===
No.	Event	Season	Driver	Co-driver
1	(Finland) 39th 1000 Lakes Rally	1989	(Sweden) Mikael Ericsson	(Sweden) Claes Billstam
2	(United Kingdom) 38th Lombard RAC Rally	1989	(Finland) Pentti Airikkala	(United Kingdom) Ronan McNamee
3	(Ivory Coast) 22ème Rallye Côte d'Ivoire Bandama	1990	(France) Patrick Tauziac	(France) Claude Papin
4	(Sweden) 40th International Swedish Rally	1991	(Sweden) Kenneth Eriksson	(Sweden) Staffan Parmander
5	(Ivory Coast) 23ème Rallye Côte d'Ivoire Bandama	1991	(Japan) Kenjiro Shinozuka	(United Kingdom) John Meadows
6	(Ivory Coast) 24ème Rallye Côte d'Ivoire Bandama	1992	(Japan) Kenjiro Shinozuka	(United Kingdom) John Meadows

== First generation (E38A/E39A; 1987) ==
First generation
- First generation Galant VR-4 (facelift)

Overview
- Model code: E38A, E39A
- Also called: Mitsubishi Eterna ZR-4 (liftback, Japan)
- Production: 1987–1992

Body and chassis
- Related: Mitsubishi Galant (sixth generation)

Powertrain
- Engine: 2.0 L 4G63T turbo I4
- Power output: 151–177 kW (202–237 hp)
- Transmission: 4-speed automatic 5-speed manual

Dimensions
- Wheelbase: 2,600 mm (102.4 in)
- Length: 4,560 mm (179.5 in)
- Height: 1,440 mm (56.7 in)
- Curb weight: 1,483 kg (3,269 lb)

Chronology
- Successor: Mitsubishi Lancer Evolution

Group A regulations dictated a turbocharged engine of 2.0 L displacement and a four-wheel drive transmission. In order to satisfy the mandatory minimum sales requirements of 5,000 units, Mitsubishi made it available in North America, New Zealand, Australia, Japan, and other Asian Pacific Rim territories, with 2,000 reaching the United States in 1991, and 1000 units imported in 1992. It also satisfied Japanese regulations concerning external dimensions and engine displacement, thereby reducing a sales handicap in Japan with regards to additional taxes paid by Japanese owners. In road-going trim the four-door sedan produced up to 195 horsepower depending on market, giving the car a top speed of over 130 mph (210 km/h) and allowing it to accelerate from 0–60 in 7.3 seconds, with a quarter mile elapsed time of 15.3 seconds. This car also featured power-assisted speed-sensitive four-wheel steering: the rear wheels steered in the same phase as the front wheels above 30 mph (48 km/h), up to 1.5 degrees.

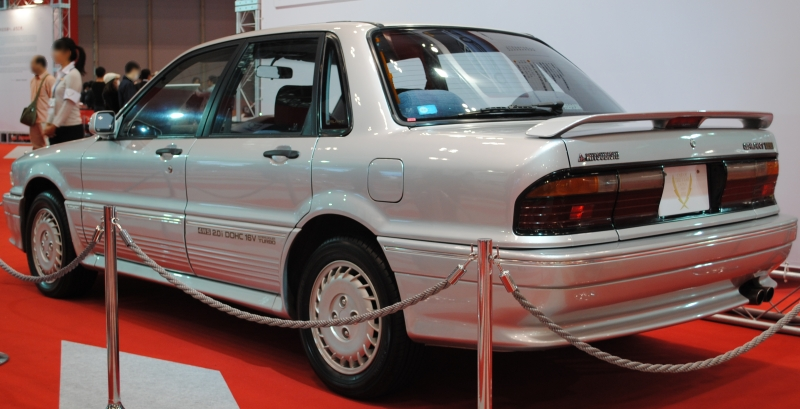
Rear view (pre-facelift)

A liftback version was also produced, known as the Eterna ZR-4. This had some minor cosmetic differences, but mechanically was the same as the VR-4 sedan. And also there are some special trim levels introduced, included VR-4 R (1987), VR-4 RS (1988), Super VR-4 (1990), VR-4 Monte Carlo (1990) and VR-4 Armed by Ralliart (1991).

Mitsubishi developed its first high performance four-wheel drive vehicle in 1987, when it equipped the Galant VR-4 with "Dynamic Four" (Mitsubishi AWC), which featured a center differential-type full-time four-wheel drive system (this system incorporated a viscous coupling unit), a four wheel steering system, four-wheel independent suspension, and a four-wheel ABS (the first total integration of these systems in the world that were highly advanced at the time).

== Second generation (E74A/E84A; 1992) ==
Second generation
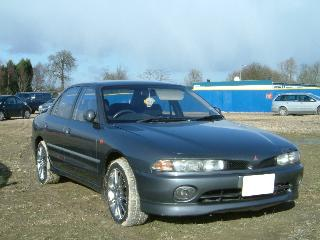
- 1993 Galant VR-4 (pre-facelift) with aftermarket wheels

Overview
- Model code: E74A, E84A
- Also called: Mitsubishi Eterna XX-4 (liftback, Japan; 1992); Mitsubishi Galant Sports GT (liftback, Japan; 1994–1996)
- Production: 1992–1997

Body and chassis
- Related: Mitsubishi Galant (seventh generation)

Powertrain
- Engine: 2.0 L 6A12TT twin-turbo V6
- Power output: 177 kW (237 hp) (manual); 158 kW (212 hp) (automatic)
- Transmission: 5-speed manual 4-speed INVECS automatic

For 1992, the emergence of the homologated Lancer Evolution meant that the top-spec Galant VR-4 was no longer constrained by sporting regulations. The new generation thus became a less overtly competition oriented vehicle. The existing, proven 4WD transmission was carried over, in keeping with Mitsubishi's reputation for performance-enhancing technology, but the old inline-four was superseded by a smoother twin-turbo 2.0-litre V6, and mated either to a conventional five-speed manual, or a four-speed INVECS auto complete with "fuzzy logic", which allowed the transmission to adapt to the driver's style and road conditions "on the fly". It was capable of accelerating from 0–60 mph (97 km/h) in about 6.5 seconds, and if derestricted could reach about 140 mph (230 km/h).

Variants of the VR-4 using the same engine and drivetrain were sold in Japan as the Eterna XX-4 liftback (1992) and the Galant Sports GT liftback (1994–96).

In 1994, the Galant VR-4 received a facelift sporting a new front bumper, new tail lights, new 15 inch wheels, and a high rise spoiler, the window glass were also changed from a brownish shade to greenish shade. Inside, the Galant featured a new seat pattern, and a new climate control similar to the ones used in the Lancer Evolution IV, V, and VI.

== Third generation (EC5A/EC5W; 1996) ==
Third generation
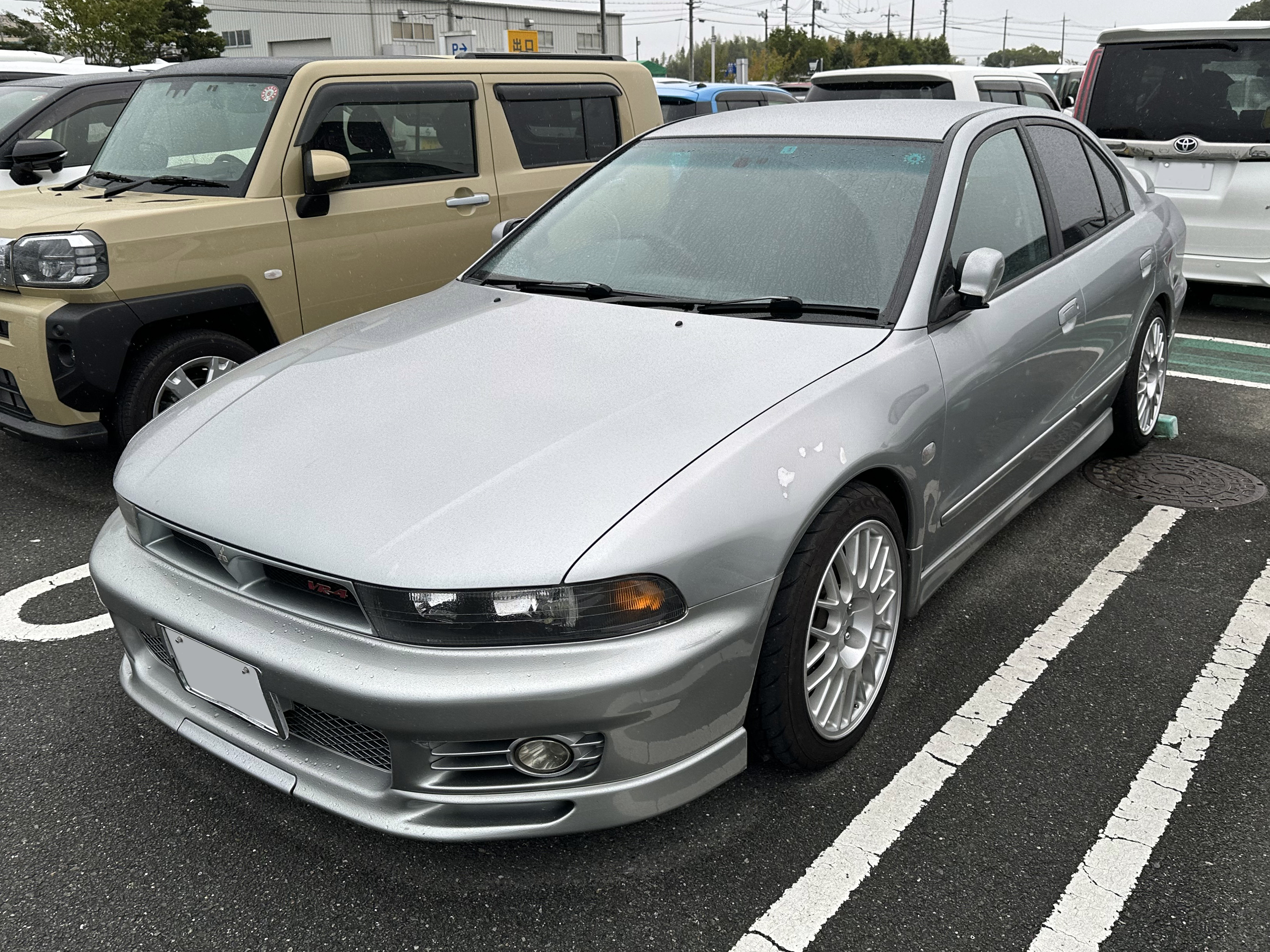
- Third generation Galant VR-4 (pre-facelift)

Overview
- Model code: EC5A, EC5W
- Also called: Mitsubishi Legnum VR-4 (wagon)
- Production: 1996–2002

Body and chassis
- Related: Mitsubishi Galant (eighth generation)

Powertrain
- Engine: 2.5 L 6A13TT twin-turbo V6
- Power output: 191 kW (256 hp) (pre-facelift); 210 kW (282 hp) (facelift)
- Transmission: 5-speed manual 5-speed INVECS-II automatic

Dimensions
- Wheelbase: 2,635 mm (103.7 in)
- Length: 4,680 mm (184.3 in)
- Width: 1,760 mm (69.3 in)
- Height: 1,420 mm (55.9 in)
- Curb weight: 1,480–1,570 kg (3,263–3,461 lb)

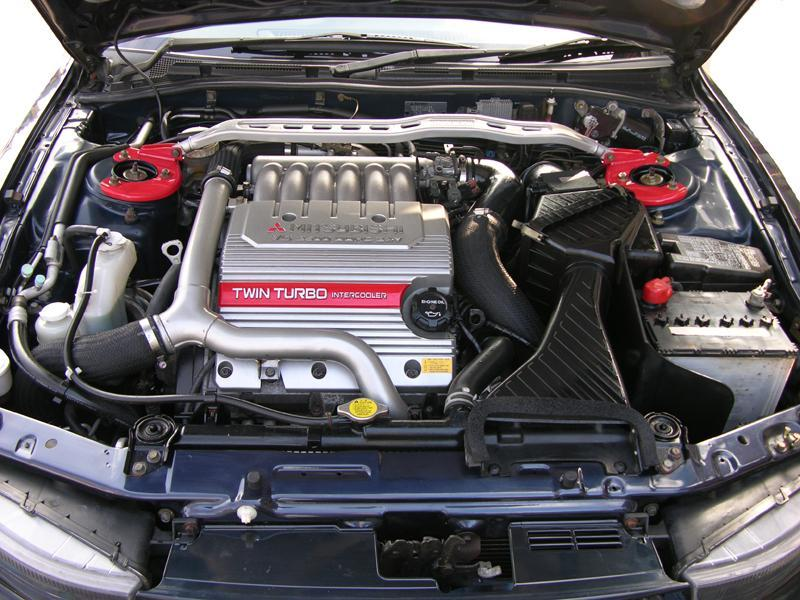
6A13TT engine.

The final VR-4 (Viscous Realtime Four Wheel Drive) was introduced in 1996. The engine capacity was enlarged substantially to 2.5 L, which pushed the power up by 15 percent to the Japanese voluntary limit of 206 kW (280 PS; 276 hp) (191 kW (260 PS; 256 hp) for the pre-facelift automatic version. The car was now capable of over 160 mph (260 km/h) when derestricted, and could accelerate from 0–60 mph (0–96 km/h) in 5.3 seconds for the 5-speed manual and 5.7 seconds for the 5-speed INVECS-II Auto, which was now an advanced self-learning automatic based on Porsche's Tiptronic transmission.

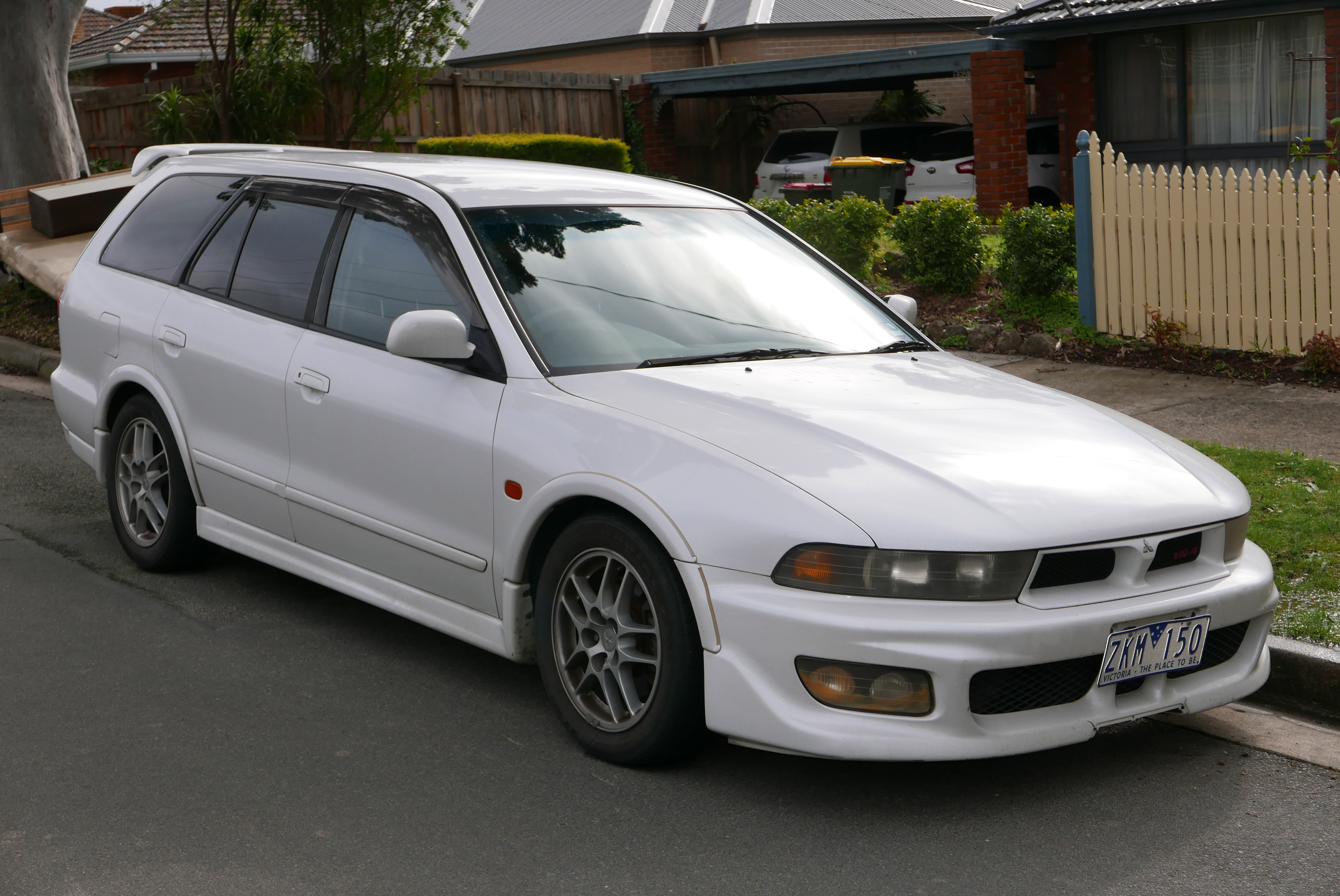
Mitsubishi Legnum VR-4 Type S (facelift)

With the eighth generation of the Galant, Mitsubishi introduced a station wagon (known in many markets as the Legnum) to replace the old 5-door hatchback, and the VR-4 was now available in both body styles.

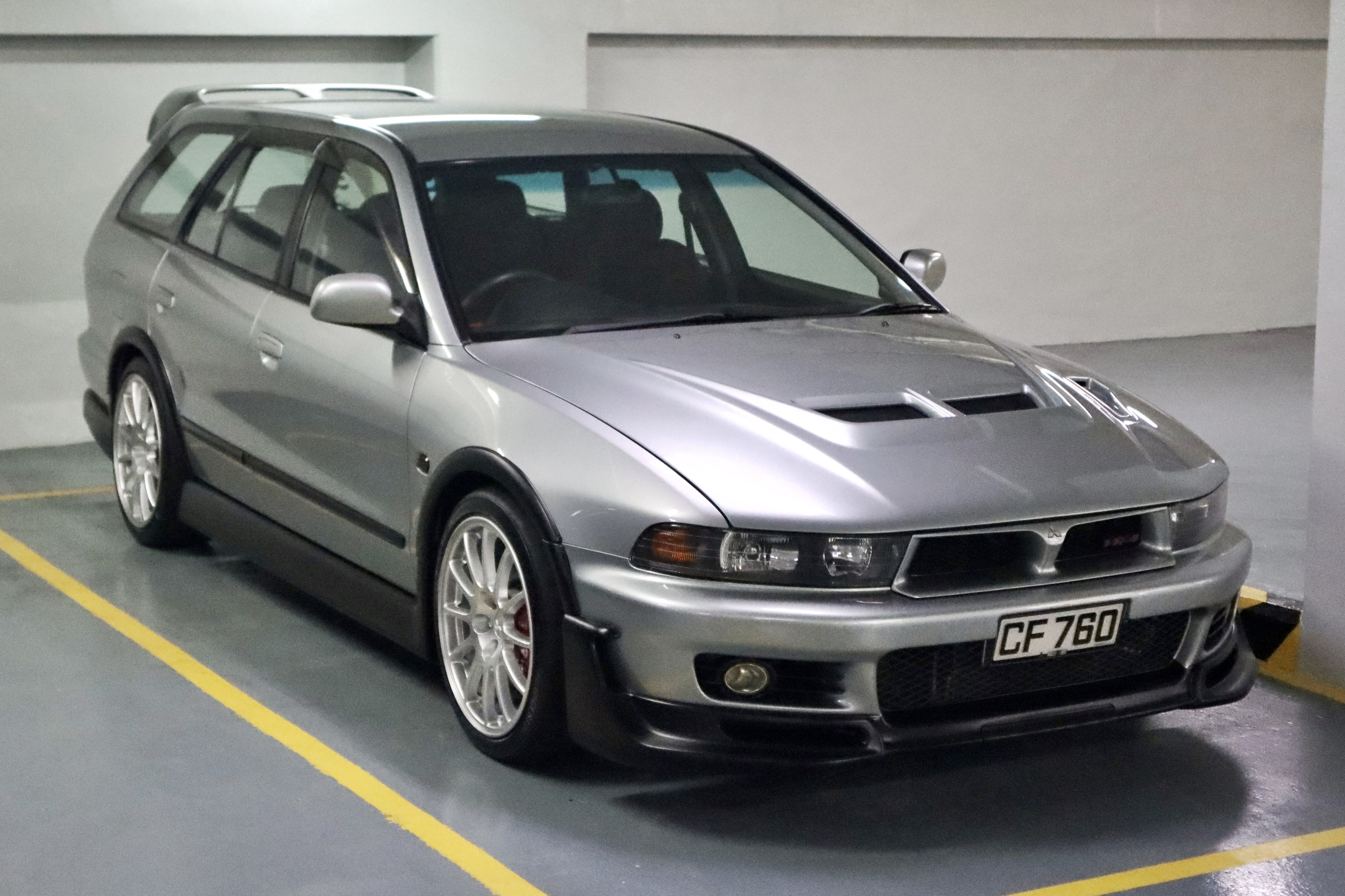
1998 Mitsubishi Legnum Super VR-4

All of the variants for the pre-facelift model offered the Active Yaw Control (AYC). This complex rear diff was first seen on the Lancer Evolution IV, and used an array of sensors to detect and quell oversteer, giving the ultimate VR-4 great agility for a vehicle of its size and weight.

The Super VR-4 trim level from this model was based on the pre-facelift Type-S and sold only in January 1998 on both the Galant sedan and the Legnum wagon, with a limited run of approximately 800 units. Only available in two colors, Redma, a bright red and Hamilton Silver. There are some cosmetic changes for the interior such as Recaro front seats and Momo steering wheel.

The facelift model was introduced in August 1998. The Recaro front seats and Momo steering wheel from the Super VR-4 could be optioned on all models. The ASC and TCL system was now optional on the automatic variants rather than included. The Type-S remained INVECS-II automatic only for the Galant sedan but manual could be available for the Legnum wagon from May 1999, along with the flared guards.

North America and Europe were again denied this model which was originally planned to be exclusively for the Japanese domestic market, much like the Nissan Skyline GTR but the burgeoning grey import trade meant that it developed a cult following in several overseas territories, especially United Kingdom, New Zealand and Australia. This model also sold in Hong Kong by grey import and official dealer (only Galant VR-4s with INVECS-II were officially imported). In 2000 MMC's motorsport partner Ralliart was contracted to type-approve Galants and Lancers for UK sales, and 200 VR-4s were officially imported before production finally ceased two years later due to the revision of vehicle emission standards in Japan.

=== Type V and Type S ===
With the eighth generation, models called Type V model and Type S were introduced to the line up as the base model VR-4 in the manual configuration and due to the popularity of the car. The Mitsubishi Galant VR-4 Type V shared the same engine as all the other eighth generation variants, twin turbo V6 6A13 and was offered in both manual and automatic transmissions. The Type V never came with AYC (active yaw control).

The eighth generation Type S model was originally introduced with manual and INVECS-II from 1996 to 1998 and the facelift (1998-2002) was only offered in INVECS-II automatic and was thus marginally slower than a manual optioned Type V. To counter this, many extras were included on the car to increase performance, such as Active Yaw Control (AYC), Traction Control Logic (TCL, Mitsubishi's branding for the traction control system) and Active Stability Control (ASC). The most notable difference is the flared guards of the Type S to fit the wider tyres offered to the automatic only. While the automatic was still slower than the manual by 4 tenths when measuring 0-100 times, the automatic transmission Mitsubishi had manufactured was very sophisticated and offered much more similar performance between manual and automatic models than many other cars of the time.
