= Rally Argentina =

Argentine motorsporting competition

- Status: active
- Genre: motorsporting event
- Frequency: annual
- Country: Argentina
- Inaugurated: 1980

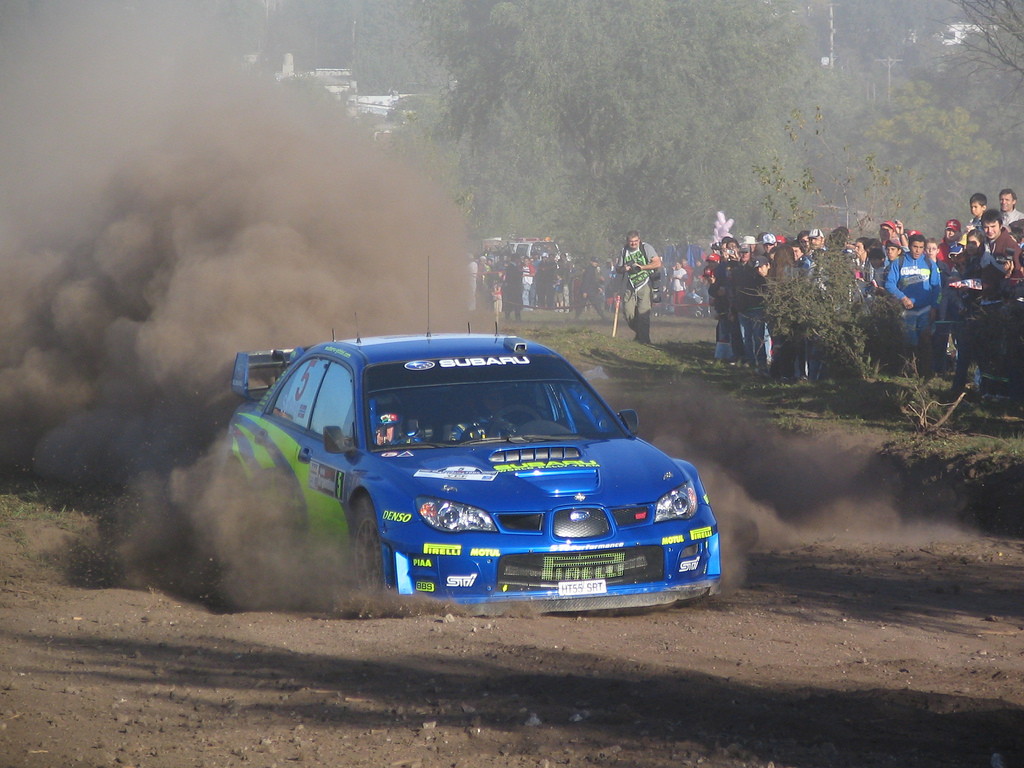
Petter Solberg during the shakedown of the 2006 event.

The Rally Argentina (Spanish: Rally de Argentina) is an Argentine rally competition that has been a round of the World Rally Championship, the Intercontinental Rally Challenge, the South American Rally Championship and the Argentine Rally Championship. It is held in the area around Villa Carlos Paz in Córdoba Province, on narrow gravel roads best known for their water-splashes.

== History ==
The rally was first run in 1980, in Tucumán Province and organized by the Automovil Club Argentino. The winners of that first edition were Walter Röhrl and Christian Geistdörfer (Fiat 131 Abarth). In the 1981 season the rally took again place in Tucumán, but in 1982 was not held due to the Falklands War. In 1983 it was moved to San Carlos de Bariloche, but in 1984 was moved to Córdoba Province, where it has been held ever since.

In the 2006 season, the rally was held on April 28, 2006 through April 30, 2006 as the fifth rally on the World Rally Championship schedule for 2006. In order to attract more spectators, in 2007 one of the sections of the rally was run in Buenos Aires in the River Plate Football Stadium, and another section in the Chateau Carreras Stadium in Córdoba city.

In 2012, the route was expanded to include some 500 km (300 mi) of competitive stages, making it the longest rally in the modern era of the sport. Famous stages include El Condor-Copina and Mina Clavero.

== Winners since 1980 ==
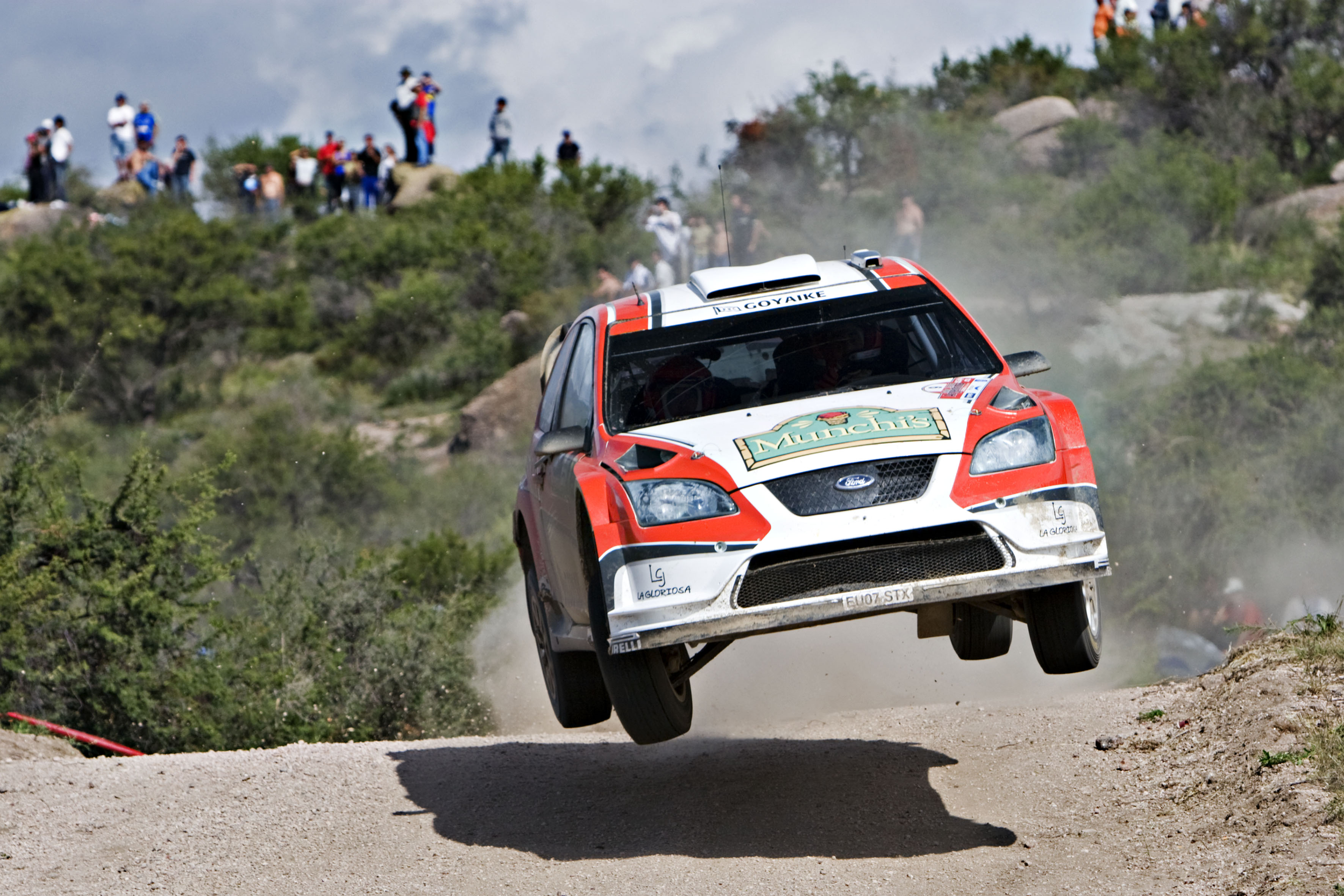
Federico Villagra during the 2008 Rally Argentina.

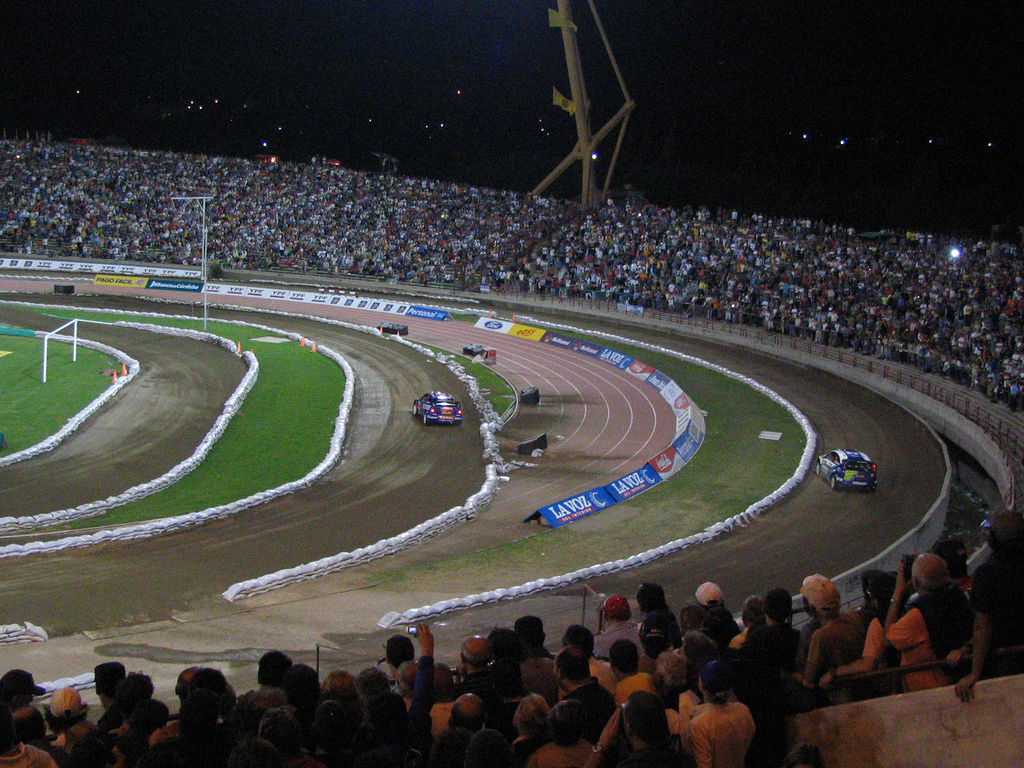
Marcus Grönholm (on the right) and Sébastien Loeb compete at a 2006 superspecial.

Pink background indicates that in that year the rally was not part of WRC calendar.

| Season | Driver | Car | Report |
|---|---|---|---|
| 1980 | (West Germany) Walter Röhrl | Fiat | |
| 1981 | (France) Guy Fréquelin | Talbot | |
| 1983 | (Finland) Hannu Mikkola | Audi | |
| 1984 | (Sweden) Stig Blomqvist | Audi | |
| 1985 | (Finland) Timo Salonen | Peugeot | |
| 1986 | (Italy) Miki Biasion | Lancia | |
| 1987 | (Italy) Miki Biasion | Lancia | |
| 1988 | (Argentina) Jorge Recalde | Lancia | |
| 1989 | (Sweden) Mikael Ericsson | Lancia | |
| 1990 | (Italy) Miki Biasion | Lancia | |
| 1991 | (Spain) Carlos Sainz | Toyota | |
| 1992 | (France) Didier Auriol | Lancia | |
| 1993 | (Finland) Juha Kankkunen | Toyota | |
| 1994 | (France) Didier Auriol | Toyota | |
| 1995 | (Argentina) Jorge Recalde | Lancia | |
| 1996 | (Finland) Tommi Mäkinen | Mitsubishi | |
| 1997 | (Finland) Tommi Mäkinen | Mitsubishi | |
| 1998 | (Finland) Tommi Mäkinen | Mitsubishi | |
| 1999 | (Finland) Juha Kankkunen | Subaru | |
| 2000 | (United Kingdom) Richard Burns | Subaru | |
| 2001 | (United Kingdom) Colin McRae | Ford | |
| 2002 | (Spain) Carlos Sainz | Ford | Report |
| 2003 | (Finland) Marcus Grönholm | Peugeot | Report |
| 2004 | (Spain) Carlos Sainz | Citroën | Report |
| 2005 | (France) Sébastien Loeb | Citroën | Report |
| 2006 | (France) Sébastien Loeb | Citroën | Report |
| 2007 | (France) Sébastien Loeb | Citroën | Report |
| 2008 | (France) Sébastien Loeb | Citroën | Report |
| 2009 | (France) Sébastien Loeb | Citroën | Report |
| 2010 | (Finland) Juho Hänninen | Škoda | Report |
| 2011 | (France) Sébastien Loeb | Citroën | Report |
| 2012 | (France) Sébastien Loeb | Citroën | Report |
| 2013 | (France) Sébastien Loeb | Citroën | Report |
| 2014 | (Finland) Jari-Matti Latvala | Volkswagen | Report |
| 2015 | (United Kingdom) Kris Meeke | Citroën | Report |
| 2016 | (New Zealand) Hayden Paddon | Hyundai | Report |
| 2017 | (Belgium) Thierry Neuville | Hyundai | Report |
| 2018 | (Estonia) Ott Tänak | Toyota | Report |
| 2019 | (Belgium) Thierry Neuville | Hyundai | Report |
| 2020 | Cancelled due to COVID-19 concerns | | |

=== Multiple winners ===
| Wins | Driver | Years won |
|---|---|---|
| 8 | (France) Sébastien Loeb | 2005–2009, 2011–2013 |
| 3 | (Italy) Miki Biasion | 1986–1987, 1990 |
| 3 | (Spain) Carlos Sainz | 1991, 2002, 2004 |
| 3 | (Finland) Tommi Mäkinen | 1996–1998 |
| 2 | (Argentina) Jorge Recalde | 1988, 1995 |
| 2 | (France) Didier Auriol | 1992, 1994 |
| 2 | (Finland) Juha Kankkunen | 1993, 1999 |
| 2 | (Belgium) Thierry Neuville | 2017, 2019 |

| Wins | Manufacturers |
|---|---|
| 10 | (France) Citroën |
| 7 | (Italy) Lancia |
| 4 | (Japan) Toyota |
| 3 | (Japan) Mitsubishi (South Korea) Hyundai |
| 2 | (Germany) Audi (France) Peugeot (Japan) Subaru (United States) Ford |
