= Ronan McNamee =

Gaelic footballer

Personal information
- Native name: Rónán Mac Con Midhe (Irish)
- Born: 31 July 1991 (age 35)
- Occupation: Sales developer

Sport
- Sport: Gaelic football
- Position: Full back
Club
- Years: Club
- Aghyaran
Inter-county
- Years: County
- 2012–2023: Tyrone
Inter-county titles
- Ulster titles: 3
- All-Irelands: 1
- All Stars: 1

Ronan McNamee (born 31 July 1991) is a Gaelic footballer who plays for the Aghyaran club and the Tyrone county team. He usually lines out at full back.

== Honours ==
Tyrone

- All-Ireland Senior Football Championship (1): 2021
- Ulster Senior Football Championship (3): 2016, 2017, 2021

Individual

- All Star Award (1): 2019
