= Jorge Recalde (rally driver) =

Argentine rally driver (1951–2001)

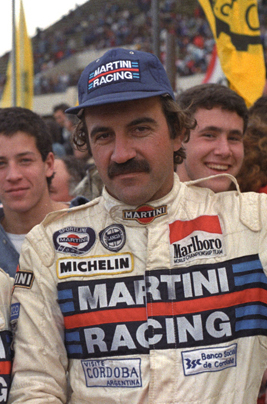

Personal information
- Nationality: (Argentina) Argentine
- Born: August 9, 1951
- Died: March 10, 2001 (aged 49)

World Rally Championship record
- Years active: 1980 – 2000
- Co-driver: (Argentina) Hector Moyana (Argentina) Enrique Tettamanti (Argentina) Nestor Straimel (Argentina) Jorge Del Buono (Italy) Pierangelo Scalvini (Argentina) Martin Christie (Argentina) José Garcia (Argentina) Diego Curletto
- Teams: Audi, Lancia, Mitsubishi
- Rallies: 69
- Championships: 0
- Rally wins: 1
- Podiums: 8
- Stage wins: 58
- Total points: 218
- First rally: 1980 Rally Portugal
- First win: 1988 Rally Argentina
- Last rally: 2000 Rally Argentina

Jorge Raúl Recalde (August 9, 1951 – March 10, 2001) was an Argentine rally driver born in Mina Clavero.

== Biography ==
Recalde had a great knowledge of the roads of the Sierras de Córdoba, and began racing in 1970 in the "Turismo Mejorado" class. He won his first rally in 1971.

Nicknamned El Cóndor de Traslasierra, Recalde was an enthusiastic promoter of motorsports in the Córdoba region of Argentina. He was the only Argentine to have won the Rally Argentina, doing so in a Lancia Delta Integrale in 1988, also becoming the only Argentine and South American to win a World Rally Championship round. He won the event again in 1995, when it was part of the 2-litre world championship due to the WRC round rotation system.

Recalde died of myocardial infarction while competing in the ninth edition of the Villa Dolores rally. On March 10, 2001, the Argentine National Congress passed national law number 26,030 declaring Recalde's home town of Mina Clavero as the national capital of rally and the date of his death March 10 as "Día Nacional del Rally Argentino" (National day of Argentine rally) in his honour.
