= Jakke Honkanen =

Finnish rally co-driver (born 1960)

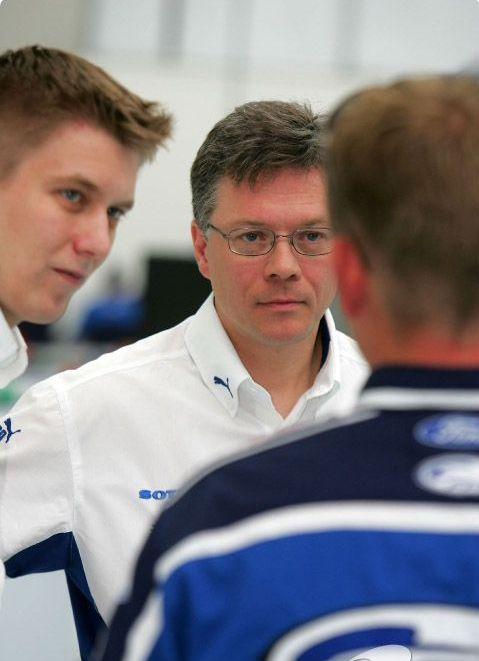
- New Zealand 2005.

Personal information
- Nationality: (Finland) Finnish
- Born: 22 May 1960 (age 66)

World Rally Championship record
- Years active: 1989–1992, 1999–2007
- Driver: (Finland) Sakari Vierimaa (United States) Tim O'Neil (Finland) Mikael Sundström (Finland) Jouko Puhakka (Finland) Jani Paasonen (Sweden) Patric Carlsson (Finland) Jussi Välimäki (Norway) Martin Stenshorne (Finland) Kosti Katajamäki (Finland) Kristian Sohlberg (Finland) Toni Gardemeister
- Teams: Mazda, Mitsubishi, Hyundai, Ford
- Rallies: 70
- Championships: 0
- Rally wins: 0
- Podiums: 5
- Stage wins: 17
- First rally: 1989 1000 Lakes Rally
- Last rally: 2007 Rallye Deutschland

Jakke Honkanen (born 22 May 1960) is a Finnish former rally co-driver, participating as co-driver in the World Rally Championship from 1989 to 2007. Past drivers include Toni Gardemeister (e.g. 2006 Monte Carlo Rally, 2007 Swedish Rally) and Jani Paasonen.
