= 1992 World Rally Championship =

20th season of the FIA World Rally Championship

Champions
- World Drivers' Champion: Carlos Sainz
- World Manufacturers' Champion: Lancia

Seasons
- ← 1991 1993 →

The 1992 World Rally Championship was the 20th season of the FIA World Rally Championship. The season consisted of 14 rallies. Carlos Sainz won his second drivers' world championship in a Toyota Celica GT-Four ST185, ahead of Juha Kankkunen and Didier Auriol. The manufacturers' title was won by Lancia, ahead of Toyota and Ford.

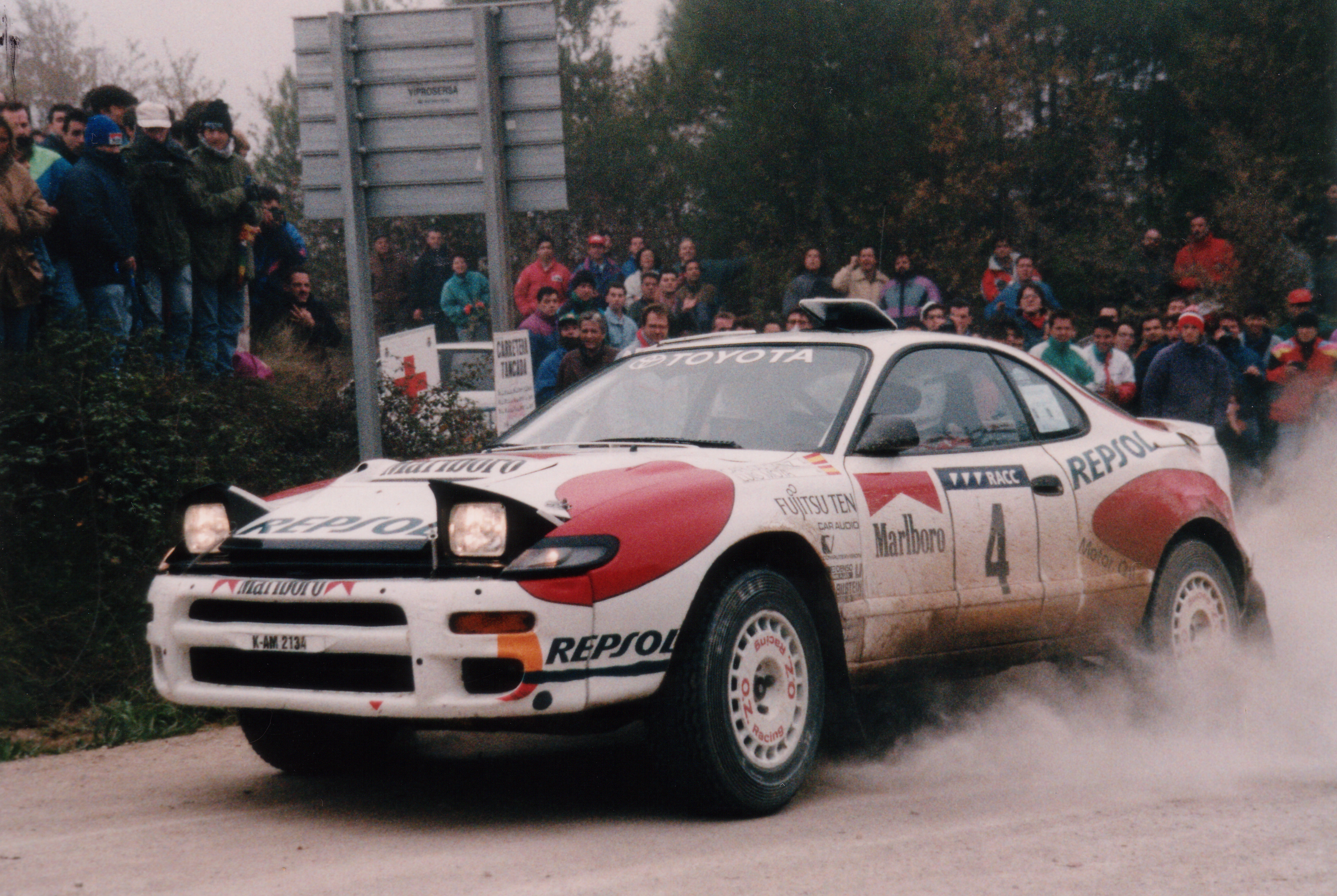
Eventual champion Carlos Sainz driving a Toyota Celica Turbo 4WD at the 1992 Rallye Catalunya.

== Calendar ==
| Rd. | Start date | Finish date | Rally | Rally headquarters | Surface | Stages | Distance | Points |
|---|---|---|---|---|---|---|---|---|
| 1 | 25 January | 29 January | (Monaco) 60th Rallye Automobile Monte-Carlo | Monte Carlo | Mixed | 26 | 628.29 km | Drivers & Manufacturers |
| 2 | 13 February | 16 February | (Sweden) 41st International Swedish Rally | Karlstad, Värmland County | Snow | 31 | 571.19 km | Drivers only |
| 3 | 3 March | 7 March | 26th Rallye de Portugal - Vinho do Porto | Estoril, Lisbon | Gravel | 40 | 577.30 km | Drivers & Manufacturers |
| 4 | 27 March | 1 April | (Kenya) 40th Safari Rally | Nairobi | Gravel | N/A | 2827.59 km | Drivers & Manufacturers |
| 5 | 3 May | 6 May | 36th Tour de Corse - Rallye de France | Ajaccio, Corsica | Tarmac | 27† | 618.37 km† | Drivers & Manufacturers |
| 6 | 31 May | 3 June | (Greece) 39th Acropolis Rally | Athens | Gravel | 40 | 564.06 km | Drivers & Manufacturers |
| 7 | 25 June | 28 June | 23rd Rothmans Rally New Zealand | Manukau, Auckland | Gravel | 38 | 584.54 km | Drivers only |
| 8 | 22 July | 25 July | 12th Rally YPF Argentina | San Miguel de Tucumán | Gravel | 28 | 579.39 km | Drivers & Manufacturers |
| 9 | 27 August | 30 August | (Finland) 42nd 1000 Lakes Rally | Jyväskylä, Central Finland | Gravel | 37 | 524.82 km | Drivers & Manufacturers |
| 10 | 19 September | 22 September | 5th Telecom Rally Australia | Perth, Western Australia | Gravel | 35 | 536.62 km | Drivers & Manufacturers |
| 11 | 12 October | 15 October | (Italy) 34th Rallye Sanremo - Rallye d'Italia | Sanremo, Liguria | Mixed | 25 | 527.48 km | Drivers & Manufacturers |
| 12 | 31 October | 3 November | (Ivory Coast) 24th Rallye Cote d'Ivoire - Bandama | Abidjan | Gravel | N/A | 2149.86 km | Drivers only |
| 13 | 9 November | 11 November | (Spain) 28th Rallye Catalunya - Costa Brava - Rallye de España | Lloret de Mar, Catalonia | Mixed | 29 | 519.65 km | Drivers only |
| 14 | 22 November | 25 November | (United Kingdom) 48th Lombard RAC Rally | Chester, Cheshire | Gravel | 34 | 567.80 km | Drivers & Manufacturers |

† - The final part of the Tour de Corse was cancelled after all medical resources on the island had to be taken due to the Furiani disaster.

== Teams and drivers ==
=== Group A major entries ===
| Team | Manufacturer | Car | Tyre | Drivers | Co-drivers | Rounds |
|---|---|---|---|---|---|---|
| (Italy) Martini Lancia | Lancia | Delta HF Intergale | M | (Finland) Juha Kankkunen | (Finland) Juha Piironen | 1, 3–4, 6, 9–11, 13–14 |
| (Italy) Martini Lancia | Lancia | Delta HF Intergale | M | (France) Didier Auriol | (France) Bernard Occelli | 1, 3, 5–6, 8–11, 13–14 |
| (Italy) Martini Lancia | Lancia | Delta HF Intergale | M | (Italy) Andrea Aghini | (Italy) Sauro Farnocchia | 3, 5, 11, 13–14 |
| (Italy) Martini Lancia | Lancia | Delta HF Intergale | M | (Argentina) Jorge Recalde | (Argentina) Martin Christie | 4, 8 |
| (Italy) Martini Lancia | Lancia | Delta HF Intergale | M | (Sweden) Björn Waldegård | (United Kingdom) Fred Gallagher | 4 |
| (Italy) Martini Lancia | Lancia | Delta HF Intergale | M | (France) Philippe Bugalski | (France) Denis Giraudet | 5, 9 |
| (Italy) Martini Lancia | Lancia | Delta HF Intergale | M | (Italy) Giorgio Faletti | (Italy) Giuseppe Cerri | 11 |
| (Italy) Jolly Club | Lancia | Delta HF Intergale | M | (France) Philippe Bugalski | (France) Denis Giraudet | 1 |
| (Italy) Jolly Club | Lancia | Delta HF Intergale | M | (Italy) Piergiorgio Deila | (Italy) Pierangelo Scalvini | 11 |
| (Portugal) Duriforte Construções | Lancia | Delta Integrale 16V | P | (Portugal) Jorge Bica | (Portugal) João Sena | 3 |
| (Italy) Giovanni Recordati | Lancia | Delta Integrale 16V | ? | (Italy) Giovanni Recordati | (Italy) Marco Verdelli | 5–6, 11 |
| (Greece) Konstantinos Apostolou | Lancia | Delta Integrale 16V | M | (Greece) Konstantinos Apostolou | (Greece) Mihalis Kriadis | 6 |
| (Italy) A.R.T. Engineering | Lancia | Delta HF Integrale | M | (Italy) Piero Liatti | (Italy) Luciano Tedeschini | 5, 7, 11 |
| (Argentina) Jorge Recalde | Lancia | Delta HF Integrale | M | (Argentina) Jorge Recalde | (Argentina) Martin Christie | 6, 10 |
| (Italy) Astra Racing | Lancia | Delta HF Integrale | P | (Italy) Alessandro Fiorio | (Italy) Vittorio Brambilla | 6, 8, 11, 13 |
| (Italy) Astra Racing | Lancia | Delta HF Integrale | P | (France) Pierre-César Baroni | (France) Philippe David | 11 |
| (Italy) Astra Racing | Lancia | Delta Integrale 16V | P | (Italy) "Artemio" | (Italy) Fabio Barisone | 11 |
| (Italy) Astra Racing | Lancia | Delta HF Integrale | P | (Spain) Pedro Javier Diego | (Spain) Icíar Muguerza | 13 |
| (Italy) Mauro Rallye Team | Lancia | Delta HF Integrale | M | (Uruguay) Gustavo Trelles | (Argentina) Jorge Del Buono | 8, 13 |
| (Italy) Mauro Rallye Team | Lancia | Delta HF Integrale | M | (Spain) Jesús Puras | (Spain) Álex Romaní | 13 |
| (Italy) Città di Castelfranco | Lancia | Delta HF Integrale | M | (Italy) Gilberto Pianezzola | (Italy) Loris Roggia | 11 |
| (Italy) Race Line Srl | Lancia | Delta HF Integrale | M | (Italy) Enrico Bertone | (Italy) Flavio Zanella | 14 |
| (Japan) Toyota Team Europe | Toyota | Celica Turbo 4WD (ST185) | P | (Spain) Carlos Sainz | (Spain) Luis Moya | 1, 3–8, 10, 13–14 |
| (Japan) Toyota Team Europe | Toyota | Celica Turbo 4WD (ST185) | P | (Germany) Armin Schwarz | (Sweden) Arne Hertz | 1, 3, 5–6, 13 |
| (Japan) Toyota Team Europe | Toyota | Celica Turbo 4WD (ST185) | P | (Finland) Markku Alén | (Finland) Ilkka Kivimäki | 1, 3–4, 6, 9, 14 |
| Toyota Team Sweden | Toyota | Celica GT-4 (ST165) | M | (Finland) Markku Alén | (Finland) Ilkka Kivimäki | 2 |
| Toyota Team Sweden | Toyota | Celica GT-4 (ST165) | M | (Sweden) Mats Jonsson | (Sweden) Lars Bäckman | 2 |
| Toyota Team Sweden | Toyota | Celica GT-4 (ST165) | M | (Sweden) Leif Asterhag | (Sweden) Christina Thörner | 2 |
| (Finland) Finnish Junior Rally Team | Toyota | Celica GT-4 (ST165) | ? | (Finland) Marcus Grönholm | (Finland) Ilkka Riipinen | 2, 9 |
| (Portugal) Adventure Boots/Toyota - Mobil | Toyota | Celica GT-4 (ST165) | ? | (Portugal) Joaquim Santos | (Portugal) Carlos Magalhães | 3 |
| Toyota Kenya | Toyota | Celica Turbo 4WD (ST185) | P | (Sweden) Mikael Ericsson | (United Kingdom) Nicky Grist | 4 |
| Toyota Kenya | Toyota | Celica GT-4 (ST165) | P | (Kenya) Ian Duncan | (Kenya) David Williamson | 4 |
| (Kenya) Sarbi Rai | Toyota | Celica GT-4 (ST165) | ? | (Kenya) Sarbi Rai | (Kenya) Supee Soin | 4 |
| (Kenya) Jonathan Toroitich | Toyota | Celica GT-4 (ST165) | ? | (Kenya) Jonathan Toroitich | (Kenya) Ibrahim Choge | 4 |
| (Japan) Yasuhiro Iwase | Toyota | Celica Turbo 4WD (ST185) | ? | (Japan) Yasuhiro Iwase | (Kenya) Sudhir Vinayak | 4 |
| (Greece) Toyota Hellas | Toyota | Celica GT-4 (ST165) | P | (Greece) "Jigger" | (Greece) Konstantinos Stefanis | 6 |
| Toyota Team Finland | Toyota | Celica GT-4 (ST165) | M | (Finland) Antero Laine | (Finland) Risto Virtanen | 9 |
| (Lebanon) Samir Assef | Toyota | Celica GT-4 (ST165) | ? | (Lebanon) Samir Assef | (Republic of Ireland) Clement Konan | 12 |
| (France) Adolphe Choteau | Toyota | Corolla AE86 | ? | (France) Adolphe Choteau | (France) Patrick Langlais | 12 |
| (Ivory Coast) Denis Occelli | Toyota | Corolla AE86 | ? | (Ivory Coast) Denis Occelli | (France) Frank Michel | 12 |
| (Switzerland) Jean-Claude Dupuis | Toyota | Corolla AE86 | ? | (Switzerland) Jean-Claude Dupuis | (France) Nathalie Copetti | 12 |
| (United Kingdom) Ford Motor Co. Ltd. | Ford | Sierra RS Cosworth 4x4 | M | (Italy) Miki Biasion | (Italy) Tiziano Siviero | 1, 3–6, 9, 11, 14 |
| (United Kingdom) Ford Motor Co. Ltd. | Ford | Sierra RS Cosworth 4x4 | M | (France) François Delecour | (France) Daniel Grataloup | 1, 3, 5–6, 9, 11, 13 |
| (United Kingdom) Ford Motor Co. Ltd. | Ford | Sierra RS Cosworth 4x4 | M | (Spain) Josep María Bardolet | (Spain) Josep Autet | 13 |
| (United Kingdom) Ford Motor Co. Ltd. | Ford | Sierra RS Cosworth 4x4 | M | (United Kingdom) Malcolm Wilson | (United Kingdom) Bryan Thomas | 14 |
| (Finland) Oy Ford Ab | Ford | Sierra RS Cosworth 4x4 | M | (Finland) Sebastian Lindholm | (Finland) Timo Hantunen | 2, 9 |
| (Finland) Eija Jurvanen | Ford | Sierra RS Cosworth 4x4 | D | (Finland) Eija Jurvanen | (Finland) Marjo Berglund | 2, 9–14 |
| (Spain) Ford España | Ford | Sierra RS Cosworth 4x4 | M | (Spain) Josep María Bardolet | (Spain) Josep Autet | 3 |
| (New Zealand) Brian Stokes | Ford | Sierra RS Cosworth 4x4 | ? | (New Zealand) Brian Stokes | (New Zealand) Jeff Judd | 7 |
| (Finland) Esa Saarenpää | Ford | Sierra RS Cosworth 4x4 | M | (Finland) Esa Saarenpää | (Finland) Lasse Hirvijärvi | 9 |
| (Italy) Ford Italia | Ford | Sierra RS Cosworth 4x4 | P | (Italy) Gianfranco Cunico | (Italy) Stefano Evangelisti | 11 |
| (United Kingdom) Gwyndaf Evans | Ford | Sierra RS Cosworth 4x4 | ? | (United Kingdom) Gwyndaf Evans | (United Kingdom) Howard Davies | 14 |
| (United Kingdom) Russell Brookes | Ford | Sierra RS Cosworth 4x4 | ? | (United Kingdom) Russell Brookes | (United Kingdom) Neil Wilson | 14 |
| (Portugal) Rodamsport | Ford | Sierra RS Cosworth | M | (Portugal) José Miguel | (Portugal) Luís Lisboa | 3 |
| (Japan) Mitsubishi Ralliart | Mitsubishi | Galant VR-4 | M | (Sweden) Kenneth Eriksson | (Sweden) Staffan Parmander | 1, 3, 6, 14 |
| (Japan) Mitsubishi Ralliart | Mitsubishi | Galant VR-4 | M | (Finland) Timo Salonen | (Finland) Voitto Silander | 1, 3 |
| (Japan) Mitsubishi Ralliart | Mitsubishi | Galant VR-4 | M | (Finland) Lasse Lampi | (Finland) Pentti Kuukkala | 2, 9, 14 |
| (Japan) Mitsubishi Ralliart | Mitsubishi | Galant VR-4 | Y | (Japan) Kenjiro Shinozuka | (United Kingdom) John Meadows | 4, 12 |
| (Japan) Mitsubishi Ralliart | Mitsubishi | Galant VR-4 | Y | (Australia) Ross Dunkerton | (Lithuania) Fred Gocentas | 7, 10 |
| (Japan) CFAO | Mitsubishi | Galant VR-4 | ? | (France) Patrick Tauziac | (France) Christian Boy | 12 |
| (Japan) Nissan Motorsports Europe | Nissan | Sunny GTI-R | D | (France) François Chatriot | (France) Michel Périn | 1, 3 |
| (Japan) Nissan Motorsports Europe | Nissan | Sunny GTI-R | D | (Finland) Tommi Mäkinen | (Finland) Seppo Harjanne | 1, 3, 9, 14 |
| (Japan) Nissan Motorsports Europe | Nissan | Sunny GTI-R | D | (Sweden) Stig Blomqvist | (Sweden) Benny Melander | 9, 14 |
| (Japan) Nissan Motorsports Europe | Nissan | Sunny GTI-R | M | (Sweden) Stig Blomqvist | (Sweden) Benny Melander | 2 |
| (Czech Republic) Škoda Motorsport | Škoda | Favorit 136 L | M | (Czech Republic) Vladimír Berger | (Czech Republic) Jiří Janeček | 1, 6 |
| (Czech Republic) Škoda Motorsport | Škoda | Favorit 136 L | M | (Czech Republic) Vladimír Berger | (Czech Republic) Miroslav Fanta | 9, 11, 13–14 |
| (Czech Republic) Škoda Motorsport | Škoda | Favorit 136 L | M | (Czech Republic) Pavel Sibera | (Czech Republic) Petr Gross | 1, 6, 9, 11, 13–14 |
| (Japan) Prodrive Subaru Rally Team Europe | Subaru | Legacy RS | M | (Finland) Ari Vatanen | (Sweden) Bruno Berglund | 2, 6–7, 9–10, 14 |
| (Japan) Prodrive Subaru Rally Team Europe | Subaru | Legacy RS | M | (United Kingdom) Colin McRae | (United Kingdom) Derek Ringer | 2, 6–7, 9, 14 |
| (Sweden) Clarion Team Europe | Subaru | Legacy RS | M | (Sweden) Per Eklund | (Sweden) Johnny Johansson | 2, 14 |
| (Kenya) Azar Anwar | Subaru | Legacy Estate | ? | (Kenya) Azar Anwar | (Kenya) Kuwinder Sandhu | 4 |
| Subaru Rally Team Australia | Subaru | Legacy RS | M | (New Zealand) Peter 'Possum' Bourne | (New Zealand) Rodger Freeth | 7, 10 |
| (New Zealand) Joe McAndrew | Subaru | Legacy RS | P | (New Zealand) Joe McAndrew | (New Zealand) Bob Haldane | 7 |
| Mazda Team Sweden | Mazda | 323 GTX | M | (Sweden) 'Nalle' | (Sweden) Anders Olsson | 2 |
| (New Zealand) Mazda Rally Team Asia Pacific | Mazda | 323 GTX | ? | (New Zealand) Rod Millen | (New Zealand) Tony Sircombe | 7, 10 |
| (New Zealand) Mazda Rally Team Asia Pacific | Mazda | 323 GTX | ? | (New Zealand) Neil Allport | (New Zealand) Jim Robb | 7 |
| Opel Team Sweden | Opel | Corsa A GSi | M | (Sweden) Per Svan | (Sweden) Johan Olsson | 2 |
| Opel Team Belgium | Opel | Calibra 16V | P | (Belgium) Bruno Thiry | (Belgium) Stéphane Prévot | 5, 11 |
| Opel Team Belgium | Opel | Kadett GSI 16V | P | (Belgium) Bruno Thiry | (Belgium) Stéphane Prévot | 12 |
| Opel Team Belgium | Opel | Astra GSi 16V | P | (Belgium) Alain Lopes | (Belgium) Jacky Delvaux | 12 |
| (Spain) Opel Team España | Opel | Corsa A GSi | M | (Spain) Luis Climent | (Spain) José Antonio Muñoz | 13 |
| (Spain) Opel Team España | Opel | Corsa A GSi | M | (Spain) Iñigo Lilly | (Spain) Mario Saguillo | 13 |
| (Portugal) Renault Galp | Renault | Clio 1.8 16V | M | (Portugal) José Carlos Macedo | (Portugal) Miguel Borges | 3 |
| (France) Société Diac | Renault | Clio 16S | M | (France) Alain Oreille | (France) Jean-Marc Andrié | 5 |
| (France) Société Diac | Renault | Clio 16S | M | (France) Jean Ragnotti | (France) Gilles Thimonier | 5 |
| (Argentina) Gabriel Raies | Renault | 18 GTX | ? | (Argentina) Gabriel Raies | (Argentina) Jose Maria Volta | 8 |
| (Argentina) Juan Pablo Raies | Renault | 18 GTX | ? | (Argentina) Juan Pablo Raies | (Argentina) Rodolfo Amelio Ortiz | 8 |
| (Argentina) Walter Augusto D'Agostini | Renault | 18 GTX | ? | (Argentina) Walter Augusto D'Agostini | (Argentina) Juan Turra | 8 |
| (Portugal) Axergie | Citroën | AX Sport | M | (Portugal) Adruzilo Lopes | (Portugal) António Abreu | 3 |
| (France) Citroën Sport | Citroën | AX GTI | M | (France) Yves Loubet | (France) Jean-Paul Chiaroni | 5 |
| (France) Citroën Sport | Citroën | AX Sport | M | (France) Christine Driano | (France) Catherine François | 5, 13 |
| (Austria) Stohl Racing | Audi | 90 Quattro | ? | (Austria) Rudolf Stohl | (Austria) Peter Diekmann | 4, 6, 8, 12 |
| (Austria) Stohl Racing | Audi | 90 Quattro | ? | (Austria) Manfred Stohl | (Germany) Kay Gerlach | 4, 12 |
| (France) Patrice Servant | Audi | 90 Quattro | ? | (France) Patrice Servant | (France) Thierry Brion | 12 |
| (Belgium) Belgian Audi Club | Audi | 90 Quattro | ? | (Belgium) Damien Chaballe | (Belgium) Dany Delvaux | 12 |
| (Kenya) Ryce Motors Ltd. | Daihatsu | Charade | D | (Kenya) Marco Brighetti | (Kenya) Abdul Sidi | 4 |
| (Kenya) Ryce Motors Ltd. | Daihatsu | Charade | D | (Kenya) Guy Jack | (United Kingdom) Des Page-Morris | 4 |
| (Kenya) Ryce Motors Ltd. | Daihatsu | Charade | D | (Kenya) Ashok Pattni | (Kenya) Zahid Mogul | 4 |
| (France) Patrick Bernardini | BMW | M3 E30 | P | (France) Patrick Bernardini | (France) Rocky Demedardi | 5 |
| (Spain) Escudería Aterura | BMW | M3 E30 | P | (Spain) José María Ponce | (Spain) José Carlos Déniz | 13 |
| Peugeot France | Peugeot | 309 GTI 16 | M | (France) Fabien Doenlen | (France) Evelyne Merciol | 5 |
| (Greece) Lion Hellas SA | Peugeot | 205 Rallye | ? | (Greece) Sotiris Kokkinis | (Greece) Stathis Mokkas | 6 |
| (Spain) Peugeot Talbot España | Peugeot | 309 GTI 16 | M | (Spain) "Capi Saiz" | (Spain) Carlos del Barrio | 13 |
| (Spain) RACC Motorsport | Peugeot | 309 GTI 16 | P | (Spain) Miguel Solé | (Spain) Joan Moreno | 13 |
| (United Kingdom) Peugeot Talbot Sport | Peugeot | 309 GTI 16 | D | (United Kingdom) Richard Burns | (United Kingdom) Robert Reid | 14 |
| (Russia) RSFSR | Lada | Samara 21083 | ? | (Russia) Sergey Alyasov | (Russia) Aleksandr Levitan | 6, 9 |
| (Russia) RSFSR | Lada | Samara 21083 | ? | (Russia) Aleksandr Artemenko | (Russia) Viktor Timkovskiy | 7, 9 |
| (Greece) Lada Hellas | Lada | Samara 21083 | ? | (Russia) Vladislav Shtykov | (Russia) Yuriy Baykov | 6 |
| (Japan) Suzuki Sport | Suzuki | Swift GTi | ? | (Australia) Russell Palmer | (Malaysia) Roland Pickering | 10 |
| (Japan) Suzuki Sport | Suzuki | Swift GTi | ? | (Japan) Nobuhiro Tajima | (Australia) Ross Runnalls | 10 |

=== FIA Group N Cup major entries ===
| Team | Manufacturer | Car | Tyre | Drivers | Co-drivers | Rounds |
|---|---|---|---|---|---|---|
| (Monaco) Christophe Spiliotis | Ford | Sierra RS Cosworth 4x4 | M | (Monaco) Christophe Spiliotis | (Monaco) Isabelle Spiliotis | 1 |
| (Italy) Lorenzo Colbrelli | Ford | Sierra RS Cosworth 4x4 | ? | (Italy) Lorenzo Colbrelli | (Italy) Gianfranco Imerito | 1 |
| (France) Jean-Paul Aymé | Ford | Sierra RS Cosworth 4x4 | ? | (France) Jean-Paul Aymé | (France) Brigitte Aymé | 1 |
| (Italy) Giovanni Manfrinato | Ford | Sierra RS Cosworth 4x4 | ? | (Italy) Giovanni Manfrinato | (Italy) Claudio Condotta | 1, 5, 9, 11 |
| (Germany) Team Matter Sicherheit | Ford | Sierra RS Cosworth 4x4 | M | (Germany) Dieter Depping | (Germany) Klaus Wendel | 1, 5 |
| (Portugal) Amocargo | Ford | Sierra RS Cosworth 4x4 | M | (Portugal) Fernando Peres | (Portugal) Ricardo Caldeira | 3 |
| (Spain) Canarias Sport Club | Ford | Sierra RS Cosworth 4x4 | M | (Spain) Fernando Capdevila | (Spain) Alfredo Rodríguez | 3, 5–6, 8, 13–14 |
| (United Kingdom) Marlboro Team Ford | Ford | Sierra RS Cosworth 4x4 | M | (United Arab Emirates) Mohammed Ben Sulayem | (Republic of Ireland) Ronan Morgan | 3, 6–7, 10–11, 13 |
| (France) Jean-Marie Santoni | Ford | Sierra RS Cosworth 4x4 | ? | (France) Jean-Marie Santoni | (France) Marcel Cesarini | 5 |
| (United Kingdom) Shell Helix Motor Oils | Ford | Sierra RS Cosworth 4x4 | D | (United Kingdom) Alister McRae | (United Kingdom) David Senior | 14 |
| (United Kingdom) Jonny Milner | Ford | Sierra RS Cosworth 4x4 | D | (United Kingdom) Jonny Milner | (United Kingdom) Chris Wood | 14 |
| Mitsubishi Ralliart Sweden | Mitsubishi | Galant VR-4 | M | (Sweden) Sören Nilsson | (Sweden) Per-Ove Persson | 2 |
| Mitsubishi Ralliart Finland | Mitsubishi | Galant VR-4 | M | (Finland) Jarmo Kytölehto | (Finland) Arto Kapanen | 2, 9–10, 14 |
| (Australia) Ed Ordynski | Mitsubishi | Galant VR-4 | ? | (Australia) Ed Ordynski | (Australia) Harry Mansson | 7 |
| (Australia) Ed Ordynski | Mitsubishi | Galant VR-4 | ? | (Australia) Ed Ordynski | (Australia) Mark Stacey | 10 |
| (Japan) Seiichiro Taguchi | Mitsubishi | Galant VR-4 | ? | (Japan) Seiichiro Taguchi | (New Zealand) Chris Clarke | 7 |
| (Australia) Craig Stallard | Mitsubishi | Galant VR-4 | ? | (Australia) Craig Stallard | (Australia) Graeme Jesse | 7, 10 |
| (Japan) Kiyoshi Inoue | Mitsubishi | Galant VR-4 | ? | (Japan) Kiyoshi Inoue | (Japan) Satoshi Hayashi | 7, 10 |
| (Finland) Juha Hellman | Mitsubishi | Galant VR-4 | ? | (Finland) Juha Hellman | (Finland) Tapio Järvi | 9 |
| (Australia) Westec Racing | Mitsubishi | Galant VR-4 | ? | (Australia) Challis Tolley | (New Zealand) Rod van der Straaten | 10 |
| (Belgium) Ecurie Hesbaye | Mitsubishi | Galant VR-4 | M | (Belgium) Guy Colsoul | (Belgium) Edy Paquay | 12 |
| (Sweden) Roger Ericsson | Subaru | Legacy RS | ? | (Sweden) Roger Ericsson | (Sweden) Ola Carlsson | 2 |
| (Kenya) Patrick Njiru | Subaru | Legacy RS | B | (Kenya) Patrick Njiru | (Kenya) Ian Munro | 4 |
| (Sweden) Per Eklund | Subaru | Legacy RS | B | (Sweden) Per Eklund | (Sweden) Johnny Johansson | 4 |
| (New Zealand) Will Orr | Subaru | Legacy RS | ? | (New Zealand) Will Orr | (New Zealand) Heather Orr | 7 |
| (Finland) Mikael Sundström | Lancia | Delta Integrale 16V | ? | (Finland) Mikael Sundström | (Finland) Jakke Honkanen | 2–3, 7 |
| (Italy) Città di Castelfranco | Lancia | Delta HF Integrale | ? | (Italy) Lorenzo Colbrelli | (Italy) Liliana Armand | 3, 5 |
| (Italy) Top Run | Lancia | Delta HF Integrale | P | (Argentina) Carlos Menem jr. | (Argentina) Victor Zucchini | 3, 5, 7–8, 10, 13 |
| (Italy) Meteco Corse | Lancia | Delta HF Integrale | P | (Italy) Romeo Deila | (Italy) Claudio Giachino | 11 |
| Nissan Belgium Rally Team | Nissan | Sunny GTI-R | P | (Belgium) Grégoire de Mevius | (Belgium) Willy Lux | 3, 6, 8–9, 12 |
| (Japan) Hiroshi Nishiyama | Nissan | Sunny GTI-R | F | (Japan) Hiroshi Nishiyama | (Japan) Hisashi Yamaguchi | 4, 8, 12 |
| (Greece) "Stratissino" | Nissan | Sunny GTI-R | P | (Greece) "Stratissino" | (Greece) Tonia Pavli | 6 |
| (Finland) Mikael Sundström | Nissan | Sunny GTI-R | ? | (Finland) Mikael Sundström | (Finland) Jakke Honkanen | 9 |
| (France) Alain Oudit | Nissan | Sunny GTI-R | ? | (France) Alain Oudit | (France) Frédéric Spaak | 12 |
| (Japan) Yoshio Fujimoto | Nissan | Pulsar GTi-R | Y | (Japan) Yoshio Fujimoto | (Japan) Hakaru Ichino | 7, 10 |
| (Italy) Rally Team Italia | Mazda | 323 GTX | M | (Italy) Alessandro Fassina | (Italy) Luigi Pirollo | 3, 6, 11, 14 |
| (New Zealand) Barry Sexton | Mazda | 323 GTX | ? | (New Zealand) Barry Sexton | (New Zealand) Neil Cathcart | 7 |
| (France) Pierre Benazzi | BMW | M3 E30 | ? | (France) Pierre Benazzi | (France) Vincent Benazzi | 5 |
| (Chile) Alejandro Schmauk | Alfa Romeo | 33 | ? | (Chile) Alejandro Schmauk | (Chile) Jaime Rojas | 8 |
| (Italy) Mirabella Mille Miglia | Peugeot | 309 GTI | M | (Italy) Angelo Medeghini | (Italy) Paolo Cecchini | 11 |
| (Spain) Armangue Competicion | Peugeot | 309 GTI | M | (Spain) David Guixeras | (Spain) Josep María Falcó | 13 |

== Results and standings ==
=== Drivers' championship ===
| Pos. | Driver | MON (Monaco) | SWE (Sweden) | POR (Portugal) | KEN (Kenya) | FRA (France) | GRE (Greece) | NZL (New Zealand) | ARG (Argentina) | FIN (Finland) | AUS (Australia) | ITA (Italy) | CIV (Ivory Coast) | ESP (Spain) | GBR (United Kingdom) | Pts |
|---|---|---|---|---|---|---|---|---|---|---|---|---|---|---|---|---|
| 1 | (Spain) Carlos Sainz | 2 | | 3 | 1 | 4 | Ret | 1 | 2 | | 3 | | | 1 | 1 | 144 |
| 2 | (Finland) Juha Kankkunen | 3 | | 1 | 2 | | 2 | | | 2 | 2 | 2 | | 2 | 3 | 134 |
| 3 | (France) Didier Auriol | 1 | | Ret | | 1 | 1 | | 1 | 1 | 1 | Ret | | 10 | Ret | 121 |
| 4 | (Italy) Miki Biasion | 8 | | 2 | | 7 | 3 | | | 5 | | 4 | | | 5 | 60 |
| 5 | (Finland) Markku Alén | Ret | 4 | 4 | 5 | | Ret | | | 3 | | | | | 4 | 50 |
| 6 | (France) François Delecour | 4 | | Ret | | 2 | 5 | | | Ret | | 3 | | Ret | | 45 |
| 7 | (Italy) Andrea Aghini | | | Ret | | 6 | | | | | | 1 | | 3 | 10 | 39 |
| 8 | (United Kingdom) Colin McRae | | 2 | | | | 4 | Ret | | 8 | | | | | 6 | 34 |
| 9 | (Italy) Alex Fiorio | | | | | | 7 | | 4 | | | 5 | | 4 | | 32 |
| 10 | (Argentina) Jorge Recalde | | | | 3 | | 6 | | Ret | | 4 | | | | | 28 |
| 11 | (Finland) Ari Vatanen | | Ret | | | | Ret | Ret | | 4 | Ret | | | | 2 | 25 |
| 12 | (Italy) Piero Liatti | | | | | 8 | | 2 | | | | 7 | | | | 22 |
| 13 | (France) Philippe Bugalski | 5 | | | | 3 | | | | 9 | | | | | | 22 |
| 14 | (Japan) Kenjiro Shinozuka | | | | 10 | | | | | | | | 1 | | | 21 |
| 15 | (Sweden) Mats Jonsson | | 1 | | | | | | | | | | | | | 20 |
| 16 | (Australia) Ross Dunkerton | | | | | | | 3 | | | 5 | | | | | 20 |
| 17 | (Belgium) Bruno Thiry | | | | | | | | | | | 9 | 2 | | | 17 |
| 18 | (Uruguay) Gustavo Trelles | | | | | | | | 3 | | | | | 7 | | 16 |
| 19 | (Germany) Armin Schwarz | Ret | | Ret | | 5 | Ret | | | | | | | 5 | | 16 |
| 20 | (Finland) Timo Salonen | 6 | | 5 | | | | | | | | | | | | 14 |
| 21= | (Sweden) Stig Blomqvist | | 3 | | | | | | | Ret | | | | | Ret | 12 |
| 21= | (France) Patrice Servant | | | | | | | | | | | | 3 | | | 12 |
| 23 | (Japan) Hiroshi Nishiyama | | | | 16 | | | | 9 | | | | 4 | | | 12 |
| 24 | (Australia) Ed Ordynski | | | | | | | 5 | | | 7 | | | | | 12 |
| 25= | (Sweden) Mikael Ericsson | | | | 4 | | | | | | | | | | | 10 |
| 25= | (Finland) Mikael Sundström | | Ret | Ret | | | | 4 | | Ret | | | | | | 10 |
| 27 | (France) François Chatriot | 7 | | 6 | | | | | | | | | | | | 10 |
| 28 | (Finland) Lasse Lampi | | 8 | | | | | | | 6 | | | | | 11 | 9 |
| 29= | (Sweden) Leif Asterhag | | 5 | | | | | | | | | | | | | 8 |
| 29= | (Austria) Rudolf Stohl | | | | 13 | | 13 | | 5 | | | | Ret | | | 8 |
| 29= | (Lebanon) Samir Assef | | | | | | | | | | | | 5 | | | 8 |
| 32= | (Sweden) Per Eklund | | 6 | | 9 | | | | | | | | | | 12 | 8 |
| 32= | (Argentina) Carlos Menem, Jr. | | | 9 | | Ret | | Ret | 6 | | Ret | | | Ret | | 8 |
| 34= | (Kenya) Ian Duncan | | | | 6 | | | | | | | | | | | 6 |
| 34= | (Japan) Yoshio Fujimoto | | | | | | | 6 | | | Ret | | | | | 6 |
| 34= | (New Zealand) Peter 'Possum' Bourne | | | | | | | Ret | | | 6 | | | | | 6 |
| 34= | (Italy) Gilberto Pianezzola | | | | | Ret | Ret | | | | | 6 | | | | 6 |
| 34= | (France) Alain Oudit | | | | | | | | | | | | 6 | | | 6 |
| 34= | (Spain) Jesús Puras | | | | | | | | | | | | | 6 | | 6 |
| 40 | (Finland) Tommi Mäkinen | 9 | | Ret | | | | | | Ret | | | | | 8 | 5 |
| 41= | (Sweden) Björn 'Nalle' Johansson | | 7 | | | | | | | | | | | | | 4 |
| 41= | (Spain) Josep María Bardolet | | | 7 | | | | | | | | | | Ret | | 4 |
| 41= | (Kenya) Sarbi Rai | | | | 7 | | | | | | | | | | | 4 |
| 41= | (New Zealand) Will Orr | | | | | | | 7 | | | | | | | | 4 |
| 41= | (Argentina) Gabriel Raies | | | | | | | | 7 | | | | | | | 4 |
| 41= | (Finland) Sebastian Lindholm | | Ret | | | | | | | 7 | | | | | | 4 |
| 41= | (Austria) Manfred Stohl | | | | Ret | | | | | | | | 7 | | | 4 |
| 41= | (Sweden) Kenneth Eriksson | Ret | | Ret | | | Ret | | | | | | | | 7 | 4 |
| 49= | (Portugal) Joaquim Santos | | | 8 | | | | | | | | | | | | 3 |
| 49= | (Kenya) Patrick Njiru | | | | 8 | | | | | | | | | | | 3 |
| 49= | (Greece) 'Jigger' | | | | | | 8 | | | | | | | | | 3 |
| 49= | (Japan) Seiichiro Taguchi | | | | | | | 8 | | | | | | | | 3 |
| 49= | (Argentina) Miguel Torrás | | | | | | | | 8 | | | | | | | 3 |
| 49= | (Australia) Tolley Challis | | | | | | | | | | 8 | | | | | 3 |
| 49= | (France) César Baroni | | | | | | | | | | | 8 | | | | 3 |
| 49= | (Ivory Coast) Denis Occelli | | | | | | | | | | | | 8 | | | 3 |
| 49= | (Spain) Pedro Diego | | | | | | | | | | | | | 8 | | 3 |
| 58= | (Sweden) Sören Nilsson | | 9 | | | | | | | | | | | | | 2 |
| 58= | (France) Jean Ragnotti | | | | | 9 | | | | | | | | | | 2 |
| 58= | (Belgium) Grégoire De Mévius | | | 13 | | | 9 | | Ret | 13 | | | Ret | | 15 | 2 |
| 58= | (New Zealand) Barry Sexton | | | | | | | 9 | | | | | | | | 2 |
| 58= | (Japan) Kiyoshi Inoue | | | | | | | 11 | | | 9 | | | | | 2 |
| 58= | (Switzerland) Jean-Claude Dupuis | | | | | | | | | | | | 9 | | | 2 |
| 58= | (United Arab Emirates) Mohammed Ben Sulayem | | | 20 | | | Ret | Ret | | | 14 | Ret | | 9 | | 2 |
| 58= | (United Kingdom) Malcolm Wilson | | | | | | | | | | | | | | 9 | 2 |
| 66= | (Finland) Jarmo Kytölehto | | 10 | | | | | | | 10 | Ret | | | | Ret | 2 |
| 66= | (Australia) Craig Stallard | | | | | | | 10 | | | 10 | | | | | 2 |
| 68= | (Monaco) Christophe Spiliotis | 10 | | | | | | | | | | | | | | 1 |
| 68= | (Portugal) José Miguel | | | 10 | | | | | | | | | | | | 1 |
| 68= | (France) Alain Oreille | | | | | 10 | | | | | | | | | | 1 |
| 68= | (Spain) Fernando Capdevila | | | 15 | | Ret | 10 | | Ret | | | | | 17 | Ret | 1 |
| 68= | (Argentina) Walter d'Agostini | | | | | | | | 10 | | | | | | | 1 |
| 68= | (Italy) Giovanni Manfrinato | Ret | | | | 19 | | | | Ret | | 10 | | | | 1 |
| 68= | (Belgium) Guy Colsoul | | | | | | | | | | | | 10 | | | 1 |
| Pos. | Driver | MON (Monaco) | SWE (Sweden) | POR (Portugal) | KEN (Kenya) | FRA (France) | GRE (Greece) | NZL (New Zealand) | ARG (Argentina) | FIN (Finland) | AUS (Australia) | ITA (Italy) | CIV (Ivory Coast) | ESP (Spain) | GBR (United Kingdom) | Pts |

Key
| Colour | Result |
|---|---|
| Gold | Winner |
| Silver | 2nd place |
| Bronze | 3rd place |
| Green | Points finish |
| Blue | Non-points finish |
| Blue | Non-classified finish (NC) |
| Purple | Did not finish (Ret) |
| Black | Excluded (EX) |
| Black | Disqualified (DSQ) |
| White | Did not start (DNS) |
| White | Cancelled (C) |
| Blank | Withdrew entry from the event (WD) |

=== Manufacturers' championship ===
| Pos. | Manufacturer | MON (Monaco) | POR (Portugal) | KEN (Kenya) | FRA (France) | GRE (Greece) | ARG (Argentina) | FIN (Finland) | AUS (Australia) | ITA (Italy) | GBR (United Kingdom) | Pts. |
|---|---|---|---|---|---|---|---|---|---|---|---|---|
| 1 | (Italy) Lancia | 1 | 1 | (2) | 1 | 1 | 1 | 1 | 1 | (1) | (3) | 140 |
| 2 | (Japan) Toyota | 2 | 3 | 1 | (4) | (8) | 2 | 3 | 3 | | 1 | 116 |
| 3 | (United Kingdom) Ford | 4 | 2 | | 2 | 3 | | 5 | | 3 | 5 | 94 |
| 4 | (Japan) Subaru | | | 8 | | 4 | | 4 | 6 | | 2 | 60 |
| 5 | (Japan) Mitsubishi | 6 | 5 | 10 | | | | 6 | 5 | | 7 | 44 |
| 6 | (Japan) Nissan | 7 | 6 | | | 9 | 9 | | | | 8 | 37 |
| 7 | (Germany) Audi | | | | | | 5 | | | | | 10 |
| 8 | (France) Renault | | | | 9 | | 7 | | | | | 9 |
| 9 | (Germany) Opel | | | | | | | | | 9 | | 2 |
| Pos. | Manufacturer | MON (Monaco) | POR (Portugal) | KEN (Kenya) | FRA (France) | GRE (Greece) | ARG (Argentina) | FIN (Finland) | AUS (Australia) | ITA (Italy) | GBR (United Kingdom) | Pts. |

== Events ==
1992 World Rally Championship schedule and results
| Rally Name | Dates run | Podium Drivers (Finishing Time) | Podium Cars |
|---|---|---|---|
| (Monaco) Rallye Monte Carlo | 23 January-28 January | 1. (France) Didier Auriol (6h:54m:20s); 2. (Spain) Carlos Sainz (6h:56m:25s); 3. (Finland) Juha Kankkunen (6h:57m:17s) | 1. Lancia Delta HF Integrale; 2. Toyota Celica Turbo 4WD; 3. Lancia Delta HF Integrale |
| (Sweden) Swedish Rally | 13 February-16 February | 1. (Sweden) Mats Jonsson (5h:24m:37s); 2. (United Kingdom) Colin McRae (5h:25m:16s); 3. (Sweden) Stig Blomqvist (5h:26m:09s) | 1. Toyota Celica GT-Four ST165; 2. Subaru Legacy RS; 3. Nissan Sunny GTi-R |
| Rallye de Portugal | 3 March-7 March | 1. (Finland) Juha Kankkunen (6h:24m:37s); 2. (Italy) Miki Biasion (6h:26m:10s); 3. (Spain) Carlos Sainz (6h:29m:36s) | 1. Lancia Delta HF Integrale; 2. Ford Sierra RS Cosworth 4x4 3. Toyota Celica Turbo 4WD |
| (Kenya) Safari Rally | 27 March-1 April | 1. (Spain) Carlos Sainz (+2m:35s penalties); 2. (Finland) Juha Kankkunen (+3m:27s penalties); 3. (Argentina) Jorge Recalde (+3m:34s penalties) | 1. Toyota Celica Turbo 4WD; 2. Lancia Delta HF Integrale; 3. Lancia Delta HF Integrale |
| (France) Tour de Corse | 3 May-6 May | 1. (France) Didier Auriol (5h:34m:49s); 2. (France) François Delecour (5h:36m:15s); 3. (France) Philippe Bugalski (5h:38m:04s) | 1. Lancia Delta HF Integrale; 2. Ford Sierra RS Cosworth 4x4 3. Lancia Delta HF Integrale |
| (Greece) Acropolis Rally | 31 May-3 June | 1. (France) Didier Auriol (7h:12m:08s); 2. (Finland) Juha Kankkunen (7h:13m:37s); 3. (Italy) Miki Biasion (7h:14m:33s) | 1. Lancia Delta HF Integrale; 2. Lancia Delta HF Integrale; 3. Ford Sierra RS Cosworth 4x4 |
| Rally New Zealand | 25 June-29 June | 1. (Spain) Carlos Sainz (6h:36m:10s); 2. (Italy) Piero Liatti (6h:40m:40s); 3. (Australia) Ross Dunkerton (6h:46m:22s) | 1. Toyota Celica Turbo 4WD; 2. Lancia Delta HF Integrale; 3. Mitsubishi Galant VR-4 |
| Rally Argentina | 22 July-25 July | 1. (France) Didier Auriol (4h:47m:26s); 2. (Spain) Carlos Sainz (4h:49m:44s); 3. (Uruguay) Gustavo Trelles (5h:01m:31s) | 1. Lancia Delta HF Integrale; 2. Toyota Celica Turbo 4WD; 3. Lancia Delta HF Integrale |
| (Finland) 1000 Lakes Rally | 27 August-30 August | 1. (France) Didier Auriol (4h:32m:45s); 2. (Finland) Juha Kankkunen (4h:33m:25s); 3. (Finland) Markku Alén (4h:34m:44s) | 1. Lancia Delta HF Integrale; 2. Lancia Delta HF Integrale; 3. Toyota Celica Turbo 4WD |
| Rally Australia | 19 September-22 September | 1. (France) Didier Auriol (5h:13m:12s); 2. (Finland) Juha Kankkunen (5h:14m:53s); 3. (Spain) Carlos Sainz (5h:15m:16s) | 1. Lancia Delta HF Integrale; 2. Lancia Delta HF Integrale; 3. Toyota Celica Turbo 4WD |
| (Italy) Rallye Sanremo | 12 October-14 October | 1. (Italy) Andrea Aghini (5h:52m:11s); 2. (Finland) Juha Kankkunen (5h:52m:51s); 3. (France) François Delecour (5h:53m:53s) | 1. Lancia Delta HF Integrale; 2. Lancia Delta HF Integrale; 3. Ford Sierra RS Cosworth 4x4 |
| (Ivory Coast) Rallye Côte d'Ivoire | 31 October-2 November | 1. (Japan) Kenjiro Shinozuka (+4h:09m:41s penalties); 2. (Belgium) Bruno Thiry (+5h:32m:59s penalties); 3. (France) Patrice Servant (+5h:38m:02s penalties) | 1. Mitsubishi Galant VR-4; 2. Opel Kadett GSI 16V; 3. Audi 90 Quattro |
| (Spain) Rally Catalunya | 9 November-11 November | 1. (Spain) Carlos Sainz (6h:21m:13s); 2. (Finland) Juha Kankkunen (6h:21m:49s); 3. (Italy) Andrea Aghini (6h:22m:45s) | 1. Toyota Celica Turbo 4WD; 2. Lancia Delta HF Integrale; 3. Lancia Delta HF Integrale |
| (United Kingdom) RAC Rally | 22 November-25 November | 1. (Spain) Carlos Sainz (5h:23m:06s); 2. (Finland) Ari Vatanen (5h:25m:22s); 3. (Finland) Juha Kankkunen (5h:25m:51s) | 1. Toyota Celica Turbo 4WD; 2. Subaru Legacy RS; 3. Lancia Delta HF Integrale |

== See also ==
- 1992 in sports
