= Peter Argetsinger =

American racing driver (1950–2020)

Peter Argetsinger (February 22, 1950 – February 6, 2020) was an American racing driver and instructor.

Argetsinger participated in numerous junior open wheel racing formulae in the late 1970s and early 1980s, finishing 14th in the 1980 Formula Ford Festival. He competed in the British Formula 3 Championship in 1982 and finished 19th in points. While in Britain, he served as a racing instructor at Brands Hatch racing school. In the mid-1980s, he switched to sports car racing, largely in the United States. He drove in the 12 Hours of Sebring as well as the 24 Hours of Daytona, driving a Mazda RX-7 in 1997, a Pillbeam prototype in 2001, and a Chevrolet Corvette in 2004. He won the inaugural Petit Le Mans in 1998. In 2007, he competed in the Koni Challenge Series. In the last decade of his life, he served as an instructor for Skip Barber Racing School and lived in Sebring, Florida.

Argetsinger's father Cameron was a founder of Watkins Glen International and was instrumental in bringing the United States Grand Prix there in 1961 and his brother Michael was also a professional racing driver, co-driving with Peter in a Lola T616 in 1985.

== Racing record ==
=== Complete British Saloon Car Championship results ===
(key) (Races in bold indicate pole position – 1980–1990 in class) (Races in italics indicate fastest lap – 1 point awarded ?–1989 in class)

| Year | Team | Car | Class | 1 | 2 | 3 | 4 | 5 | 6 | 7 | 8 | 9 | DC | Pts | Class |
|---|---|---|---|---|---|---|---|---|---|---|---|---|---|---|---|
| 1986 | Brands Hatch Racing School | Ford Escort XR3i | **XR3i** | SIL | THR | SIL | DON | BRH | SNE | BRH ovr:16 cls:5 | DON | SIL | NC | 0 | NC |
