= 1986 British Saloon Car Championship =

29th season of the British Touring Car Championship

Seasons
- ← 1985 1987 →

The 1986 RAC British Saloon Car Championship was the 29th season of the championship, and the final under the name of The British Saloon Car Championship. Chris Hodgetts won the title with his class C Toyota Corolla.

== Teams & Drivers ==
Guest drivers in italics.

Team	Car	No.	Drivers	Rounds
Class A
Industrial Control Services Ltd.	Ford Sierra XR4Ti	1	(United Kingdom) Andy Rouse	All
Industrial Control Services Ltd.	Rover Vitesse	2	(United Kingdom) Pete Hall	All
BBW Motorsport	Mitsubishi Starion Turbo	3	(United Kingdom) Dave Brodie	5
BBW Motorsport	Mitsubishi Starion Turbo	6	(United Kingdom) Dave Brodie	9
Dennis Leech	Rover Vitesse	4	(United Kingdom) Dennis Leech	1–5, 9
Burlington Wallcoverings Ltd.	BMW 635CSi	5	(United Kingdom) Mike Newman	All
Linden Racing/Connells Estate Agents	Rover Vitesse	6	(United Kingdom) Neil McGrath	5
Linden Racing/Connells Estate Agents	Rover Vitesse	7	(United Kingdom) Neil McGrath	3
Linden Racing/Connells Estate Agents	Rover Vitesse	7	(United Kingdom) Mike O'Brien	2, 4–9
Hughes of Beaconsfield	Toyota Celica Supra	9	(United Kingdom) Pete Lovett	1
Hughes of Beaconsfield	Toyota Celica Supra	9	(United Kingdom) David Sears	5
Mann's Garage	BMW 635CSi	13	(United Kingdom) Barry Barnes	1
TWR – Herbie Clips	Rover Vitesse	20	(United Kingdom) Jeff Allam	5
TWR – Herbie Clips	Rover Vitesse	22	(France) Jean-Louis Schlesser	5
T.W. Robinson Demolition/SDC Builders	BMW 635CSi	25	(United Kingdom) Barry Robinson	9
Brian Chatfield	Ford Capri III 3.0S	8	(United Kingdom) Brian Chatfield	3, 5–6
Class B
John West Foods – Alfa Romeo Dealer Team	Alfa Romeo GTV6	30	(United Kingdom) Rob Kirby	1
John West Foods – Alfa Romeo Dealer Team	Alfa Romeo 75 V6	30	(United Kingdom) Rob Kirby	2–9
John West Foods – Alfa Romeo Dealer Team	Alfa Romeo 75 V6	31	(United Kingdom) Jon Dooley	2–9
Royal Mail Datapost	Ford Escort RS Turbo	33	(United Kingdom) Alan Curnow	All
Royal Mail Datapost	Ford Escort RS Turbo	44	(United Kingdom) Richard Longman	All
Carroll's Transport	Mercedes 190E 2.3–16	36	(United Kingdom) Martin Carroll	5
Terry Drury Racing	Ford Escort RS Turbo	38	(United Kingdom) Mark Hales	All
Smith & Latimer	MG Metro Turbo	55	(United Kingdom) Colin Pearcy	5, 9
David Gibson	Renault 5 GT Turbo	45	(United Kingdom) David Gibson	5
David Grimshaw	Renault 5 GT Turbo	35	(United Kingdom) David Grimshaw	5
Antony Pownall	Renault 5 GT Turbo	46	(United Kingdom) Antony Pownall	5
Roger Saunders	Renault 5 GT Turbo	48	(United Kingdom) Roger Saunders	5
Class C
Peugeot Talbot Sport UK	Peugeot 205 GTi	61	(Finland) Mikael Sundström	5, 7
Tony Crudgington	Toyota Corolla GT	62	(United Kingdom) Tony Crudgington	All
Team Toyota GB/Duckhams; CHMS Team/Demon Tweeks Racing	Toyota Corolla GT	66	(United Kingdom) Chris Hodgetts	All
Team Toyota GB/Duckhams; CHMS Team/Demon Tweeks Racing	Toyota Corolla GT	77	(United Kingdom) Alan Minshaw	5–6
Team Toyota GB/Duckhams; CHMS Team/Demon Tweeks Racing	Toyota Corolla GT	77	(United Kingdom) Barry Sheene	9
Brooklyn Motorsport/ECS	Ford Escort RS1600i	69	(United Kingdom) Paul Taft	All
North Essex Motorsport	Ford Escort RS1600i	74	(United Kingdom) Richard Belcher	5–6, 9
AGK Motorsport	Toyota Corolla GT	77	(United Kingdom) Geoff Kimber-Smith	1
Abbott Racing	Ford Escort RS1600i	?	(United Kingdom) Lionel Abbott	2
Alastair Davidson	Ford Fiesta XR2	72	(United Kingdom) Alastair Davidson	2–3, 5
Nick Sismey	Alfa Romeo Alfasud Ti 1.5	78	(United Kingdom) Nick Sismey	5
Class D
Containerships	Vauxhall Nova Sport	93	(United Kingdom) James Kaye	5
Monorep Ltd. Vauxhall Opel Main Dealer	Vauxhall Nova Sport	91	(United Kingdom) Tony Lanfranchi	3, 5–6
Brands Hatch Racing School
Brands Hatch Racing School	Ford Escort XR3i	?	(United States) Peter Argetsinger	7
Brands Hatch Racing School	Ford Escort XR3i	?	(United Kingdom) Stuart Cole	7
Brands Hatch Racing School	Ford Escort XR3i	?	(United Kingdom) Chris Creswell	7
Brands Hatch Racing School	Ford Escort XR3i	?	(United Kingdom) Ben Edwards	7
Brands Hatch Racing School	Ford Escort XR3i	?	(United Kingdom) Pete King	7
Brands Hatch Racing School	Ford Escort XR3i	?	(United Kingdom) Lucy Rogers	7
Brands Hatch Racing School	Ford Escort XR3i	?	(United Kingdom) Pete Rogers	7
Brands Hatch Racing School	Ford Escort XR3i	?	(United Kingdom) Rick Shortle	7

== Calendar & Winners ==
All races were held in the United Kingdom. Overall winners in **bold**.

Round	Circuit	Date	Class A Winner	Class B Winner	Class C Winner	Class D Winner
1	Silverstone Circuit, Northamptonshire	13 April	(United Kingdom) **Andy Rouse**	(United Kingdom) Richard Longman	(United Kingdom) Chris Hodgetts	None (no entries)
2	Thruxton Circuit, Hampshire	26 May	(United Kingdom) **Mike Newman**	(United Kingdom) Rob Kirby	(United Kingdom) Chris Hodgetts	None (no entries)
3	Silverstone Circuit, Northamptonshire	8 June	(United Kingdom) **Andy Rouse**	(United Kingdom) Richard Longman	(United Kingdom) Chris Hodgetts	(United Kingdom) Tony Lanfranchi
4	Donington Park, Leicestershire	15 June	(United Kingdom) **Andy Rouse**	(United Kingdom) Richard Longman	(United Kingdom) Chris Hodgetts	None (no entries)
5	Brands Hatch, Kent	13 July	(United Kingdom) **Jeff Allam**	(United Kingdom) Richard Longman	(United Kingdom) Chris Hodgetts	(United Kingdom) James Kaye
6	Snetterton Motor Racing Circuit, Norfolk	10 August	(United Kingdom) **Pete Hall**	(United Kingdom) Richard Longman	(United Kingdom) Chris Hodgetts	(United Kingdom) Tony Lanfranchi
7	Brands Hatch, Kent	25 August	(United Kingdom) **Andy Rouse**	(United Kingdom) Alan Curnow	(Finland) Mikael Sundström	None (no entries)
8	Donington Park, Leicestershire	14 September	(United Kingdom) **Andy Rouse**	(United Kingdom) Mark Hales	(United Kingdom) Chris Hodgetts	None (no entries)
9	Silverstone Circuit, Northamptonshire	5 October	(United Kingdom) **Dave Brodie**	(United Kingdom) Richard Longman	(United Kingdom) Chris Hodgetts	None (no entries)

== Championship Standings ==
=== Drivers' championship ===
Points were awarded on a 9, 6, 4, 3, 2, 1 basis to the top six finishers in each class, with one bonus point for the fastest lap in each class. Unlike previous seasons, full points were awarded to all classes regardless of how many cars started. Only a driver's best seven scores counted towards the championship. Positions are shown as overall/class.

Pos	Driver	Class	SIL	THR	SIL	DON	BRA	SNE	BRA	DON	SIL	Pts
1	(United Kingdom) Chris Hodgetts	C	**9/1**	**4/1**	**7/1**	**4/1**	**12/1**	**7/1**	**5/2**	**7/1**	**8/1**	70
2	(United Kingdom) Richard Longman	B	5/1	**7/3**	**3/1**	**3/1**	**8/1**	**3/1**	**7/2**	**Ret**	**3/1**	64
3	(United Kingdom) Andy Rouse	A	**1/1**	**2/2**	**1/1**	**1/1**	Ret	**Ret**	**1/1**	**1/1**	**Ret**	57
4	(United Kingdom) Rob Kirby	B	**7/2**	3/1	10/3	5/2	9/2	8/5	11/5	8/3	7/4	38
5	(United Kingdom) Mike Newman	A	6/5	1/1	6/4	2/2	7/7	2/2	8/4	2/2	4/3	37
6	(United Kingdom) Pete Hall	A	3/3	9/3	4/3	Ret	5/5	1/1	4/3	4/4	2/2	34
7	(United Kingdom) Paul Taft	C	12/4	5/2	8/2	6/2	Ret	9/2	Ret	Ret	9/2	33
8	(United Kingdom) Alan Curnow	B	Ret	8/4	5/2	Ret	19/6	4/2	6/1	Ret	5/2	32
9	(United Kingdom) Tony Lanfranchi	D			**12/1**		24/2	**11/1**				26
10	(United Kingdom) Jon Dooley	B		6/2	Ret	Ret	NC	6/4	9/3	6/2	6/3	23
11	(United Kingdom) Tony Crudgington	C	10/2	DNS	9/3	7/3	Ret	DNS	17/3	Ret	10/3	23
12	(United Kingdom) Mark Hales	B	Ret	Ret	Ret	Ret	18/5	5/3	10/4	5/1	Ret	20
13	(Finland) Mikael Sundström	C					14/3		3/1			14
14	(United Kingdom) Mike O'Brien	A		Ret		DNS	6/6	Ret	2/2	3/3	Ret	11
15	(United Kingdom) James Kaye	D					**17/1**					10
15	(United Kingdom) Alan Minshaw	C					13/2	10/3				10
15	(United Kingdom) Dennis Leech	A	2/2	Ret	DNS	DNS	4/4				DNS	10
15	(United Kingdom) Dave Brodie	A					Ret				1/1	10
19	(United Kingdom) Jeff Allam	A					1/1					9
20	(United Kingdom) Alastair Davidson	C		11/4	11/4		23/5					8
21	(France) Jean-Louis Schlesser	A					**2/2**					7
22	(United Kingdom) Neil McGrath	A			2/2		Ret					6
22	(United Kingdom) Colin Pearcy	B					11/3				12/5	6
24	(United Kingdom) David Sears	A					3/3					4
24	(United Kingdom) Lionel Abbott	C		10/3								4
24	(United Kingdom) Geoff Kimber-Smith	C	11/3									4
27	(United Kingdom) Pete Lovett	A	4/4									3
27	(United Kingdom) Nick Sismey	C					15/4					3
27	(United Kingdom) Roger Saunders	B					16/4					3
29	(United Kingdom) Richard Belcher	C					Ret	Ret			13/5	2
30	(United Kingdom) Barry Barnes	A	8/6									1
31	(United Kingdom) David Grimshaw	B					20/7					0
32	(United Kingdom) Brian Chatfield	A			DSQ		10/8	Ret				0
33	(United Kingdom) David Gibson	B					21/8					0
34	(United Kingdom) Antony Pownall	B					22/9					0
NC	(United Kingdom) Martin Carroll	B					Ret					0
NC	(United Kingdom) Barry Robinson	A									Ret	0
guest drivers ineligible for points
	(United Kingdom) Stuart Cole	XR3i							12/1			0
	(United Kingdom) Chris Creswell	XR3i							13/2			0
	(United Kingdom) Rick Shortle	XR3i							**14/3**			0
	(United Kingdom) Barry Sheene	C									11/4	0
	(United Kingdom) Pete Rogers	XR3i							15/4			0
	(United States) Peter Argetsinger	XR3i							16/5			0
	(United Kingdom) Ben Edwards	XR3i							18/6			0
	(United Kingdom) Lucy Rogers	XR3i							19/7			0
	(United Kingdom) Pete King	XR3i							20/8			0
Pos	Driver	Class	SIL	THR	SIL	DON	BRA	SNE	BRA	DON	SIL	Pts

Colour	Result
Gold	Winner
Silver	Second place
Bronze	Third place
Green	Points classification
Blue	Non-points classification
Blue	Non-classified finish (NC)
Purple	Retired, not classified (Ret)
Red	Did not qualify (DNQ)
Red	Did not pre-qualify (DNPQ)
Black	Disqualified (DSQ)
White	Did not start (DNS)
White	Withdrew (WD)
White	Race cancelled (C)
Blank	Did not practice (DNP)
Blank	Did not arrive (DNA)
Blank	Excluded (EX)

**Bold** - Pole in class
Italics - Fastest lap in class
