= Mikael Sundström =

Finnish rally driver (1957–2001)

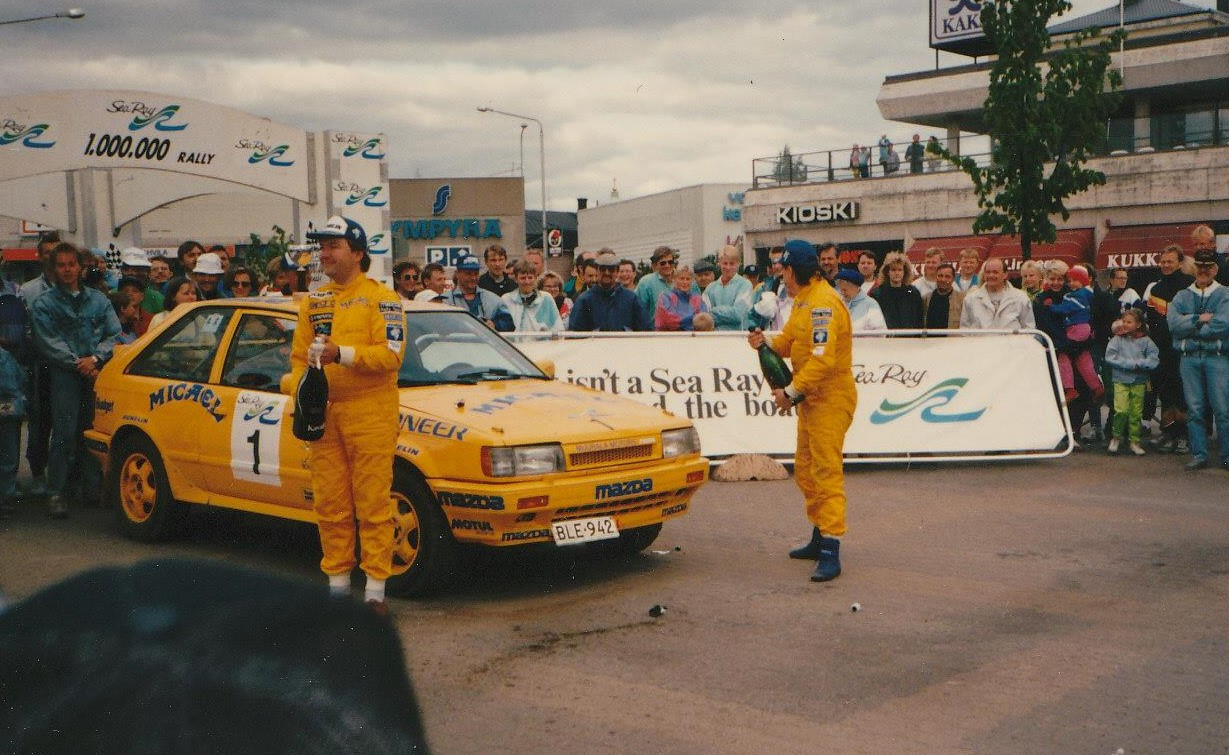
- Sundström and co-driver Juha Repo after winning Miljoonaralli Hamina in 1990.

Personal information
- Nationality: (Finland) Finnish
- Born: 10 September 1957
- Died: 23 January 2001 (aged 43)

World Rally Championship record
- Years active: 1979–1992
- Co-driver: (Finland) Rauno Sorjonen (Finland) Voitto Silander (United Kingdom) Martin Coleman (Finland) Hannu Wallinheimo (Finland) Jaakko Markkula (United Kingdom) David Orrick (United Kingdom) Paul White (Finland) Juha Repo (Finland) Jakke Honkanen
- Teams: Peugeot, Mazda
- Rallies: 28
- Championships: 0
- Rally wins: 0
- Podiums: 0
- Stage wins: 0
- Total points: 26
- First rally: 1979 1000 Lakes Rally
- Last rally: 1992 1000 Lakes Rally

Mikael Sundström (10 September 1957 – 23 January 2001) was a five-time national champion rally driver, from Finland.

== World Rally Championship ==
Sundström competed sporadically in the World Rally Championship from 1979 to 1992.

Sundström's best result was fourth in the 1986 Rally Great Britain and the 1992 Rally New Zealand

== British Touring Car Championship ==
Sundström entered the two Brands Hatch rounds of the 1986 British Saloon Car Championship. He raced a Peugeot 205, making him the first driver to race a Peugeot in the series. He notably came third outright and won his class on his second outing after starting from the pitlane.

== Racing record ==
=== Complete WRC results ===
Year	Entrant	Car	1	2	3	4	5	6	7	8	9	10	11	12	13	14	WDC	Pts
1979	Oy Nowerco Ab	Chrysler Avenger	MON	SWE	POR	KEN	GRE	NZL	FIN; Ret	CAN	ITA	FRA	GBR	CIV			NC	0
1980	Oy Nowerco Ab	Ford Escort RS2000	MON	SWE	POR	KEN	GRC	ARG	FIN; Ret	NZL	ITA	FRA	GBR; 14	CIV			NC	0
1981	Autonovo Oy	Fiat Ritmo 75 Abarth	MON	SWE	POR	KEN	FRA	GRE	ARG	BRA	FIN; 19	ITA	CIV				NC	0
1981	Mikael Sundström	Ford Escort RS2000												GBR; Ret			NC	0
1983	Muurala Motors	Opel Ascona	MON	SWE	POR	KEN	FRA	GRE	NZL	ARG	FIN; 11	ITA	CIV				49th	3
1983	Mikael Sundström	Opel Ascona												GBR; 9			49th	3
1984	Autonovo	Fiat Ritmo Abarth 130 TC	MON	SWE	POR	KEN	FRA	GRE	NZL	ARG	FIN; Ret	ITA	CIV	GBR			NC	0
1985	Autonovo	Fiat Ritmo 130	MON	SWE	POR	KEN	FRA	GRE	NZL	ARG	FIN; Ret	ITA	CIV				NC	0
1985	Peugeot Talbot Sport	Peugeot 205 Turbo 16												GBR; Ret			NC	0
1986	Autonovo	Fiat Uno Turbo	MON	SWE	POR	KEN	FRA	GRE	NZL	ARG	FIN; Ret	CIV	ITA				22nd	10
1986	Peugeot Talbot Sport	Peugeot 205 Turbo 16 E2												GBR; 4	USA		22nd	10
1987	Mikael Sundström	Mazda 323 4WD	MON	SWE; Ret	POR	KEN	FRA	GRE	USA	NZL	ARG						NC	0
1987	Haka-Auto	Mazda 323 4WD										FIN; Ret	CIV	ITA	GBR; Ret		NC	0
1988	Haka-Auto	Mazda 323 4WD	MON	SWE; Ret	POR	KEN	FRA	GRE	USA	NZL	ARG	FIN; Ret	CIV	ITA	GBR; Ret		NC	0
1989	Haka-Auto	Mazda 323 4WD	SWE; Ret	MON	POR	KEN	FRA	GRE	NZL	ARG							52nd	4
1989	Mazda Rally Team Finland	Mazda 323 4WD									FIN; Ret	AUS	ITA	CIV	GBR; 7		52nd	4
1990	Mazda Rally Team Finland	Mazda 323 4WD	MON	POR	KEN	FRA	GRC	NZL	ARG	FIN; Ret	AUS	ITA	CIV	GBR; Ret			NC	0
1991	Mazda Rally Team Finland	Mazda 323 4WD	MON	SWE	POR	KEN	FRA	GRC	NZL	ARG	FIN; 12	AUS	ITA	CIV	ESP	GBR	NC	0
1992	Mikael Sundström	Lancia Delta Integrale 16V	MON	SWE; Ret	POR; Ret	KEN	FRA	GRE	NZL; 4	ARG							25th	10
1992	Mikael Sundström	Nissan Sunny GTI-R									FIN; Ret	AUS	ITA	CIV	ESP	GBR	25th	10

=== Complete British Saloon Car Championship results ===
(key) (Races in bold indicate pole position; races in italics indicate fastest lap.)

Year	Team	Car	Class	1	2	3	4	5	6	7	8	9	DC	Pts	Class
1986	Peugeot Talbot Sport UK	Peugeot 205 GTI	C	SIL	THR	SIL	DON	BRH ovr:14 cls:3	SNE	BRH ovr:3 cls:1	DON	SIL	13th	15	4th
