= Rally Australia =

Automobile rally in Australia

- Genre: Motorsport Event
- Locations: Perth (1988-2006); Northern Rivers (2009); Coffs Harbour (2011-2018)
- Country: Australia
- Inaugurated: 1988
- Most recent: 2018

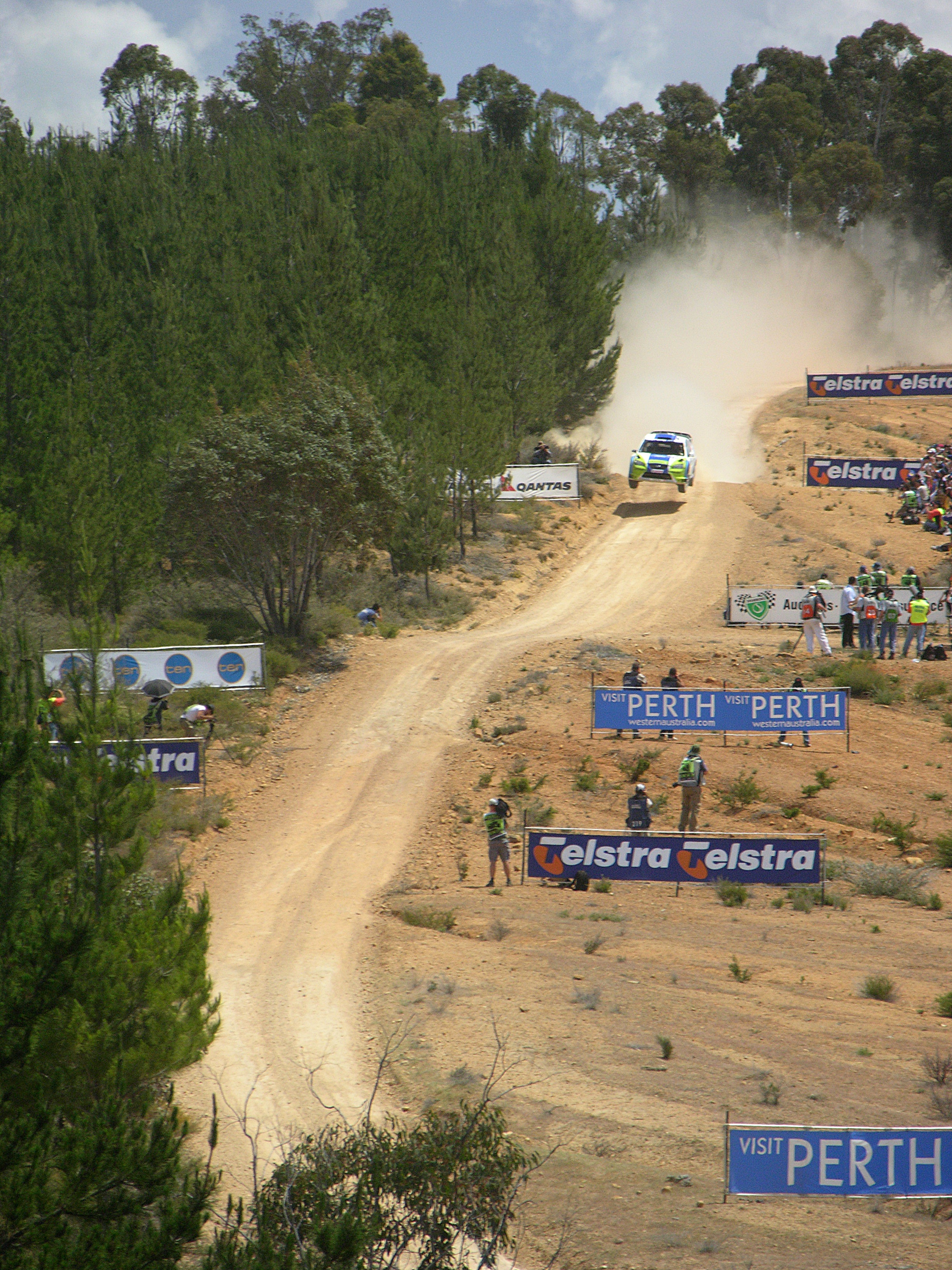
Marcus Grönholm at the Bunnings Jumps, one of the most famous features of the Rally Australia.

Rally Australia is an automobile rally event which was held as a round of the World Rally Championship (WRC), most recently in 2018 based in Coffs Harbour as the final round of the series.

First run in 1988, the rally was held in and around Perth, Western Australia until 2006. It was part of the Asia-Pacific Rally Championship in 1988 and the WRC from 1989 to 2006. The rally returned in 2009 to the Northern Rivers region of New South Wales in early September and alternated with Rally New Zealand for 2010 and 2012 before becoming an annual fixture again in its own right from 2013. From 2011, the event was relocated to Coffs Harbour. As of August 2019, the Rally Australia event did not have a contract with WRC to be part of the World Championship beyond 2019.

The event has also been a round of the Australian Rally Championship although not consistently as the ARC technical regulations has been incompatible with the WRC in some years. Similarly the Western Australian Rally Championship has also been a part of Rally Australia during its Perth-based history.

== History ==
The FIA World Rally Championship first came to Australia hosted in Perth, the state capital of Western Australia. Initially a super-special stage was run at Richmond Raceway near Fremantle, before the famous Langley Park stage became revolutionary on the banks of the Swan River. World-famous stages included those in the Bannister Forest, with the Bunnings Jumps drawing thousands of fans each year, and the likes of Muresk, Wellington and Dwellingup areas.

It was praised for its unique road surface, consisting of tiny, smooth round stones that had the effect of driving on ball bearings. Rally Australia was voted "Rally of the Year" in 1995, 1999 and 2000 by the WRC teams.

The 2006 rally held on 26 to 29 October was the final event staged in Western Australia. It was cancelled by the holders of the rally contract, the Western Australia Tourism Commission after the Australian Labor Party, then in Parliament, decided to withdraw funding. This was despite widespread support for the rally, which saw it as the largest annual international event held in Perth.

After missing a year from the 2007 WRC calendar, Rally Australia was heavily expected have a new home from 2008, based on the Gold Coast, Queensland on the east coast of Australia. However without planning approval from the Queensland state government to construct the proposed I-METT facility to headquarter the rally, the event remained on hiatus.

Rally Australia's return was announced for September 2009, with the event to be based out of Kingscliff in northern New South Wales (NSW). The event was to alternate year to year with the Rally New Zealand for a place on the World Rally Championship. The NSW state government designated the rally a major event, citing the huge impact of the event upon the economy of the region. The location for the event, planned to run there every second year until roughly 2020, was agreed upon between Rally Australia directors, local mayors and representatives from Events NSW, a state government tourism body.

After a sole year in Kingscliff, the event moved to Coffs Harbour, a city which had decades of rally history in the Australian Rally Championship and through Southern Cross Rally events in the decades prior.

The final time it was on the calendar, 2019, the event was cancelled due to bushfires rapidly closing in on the rally's base.

== Controversy ==
When the event moved to New South Wales, an Act of New South Wales Parliament, the Motor Sports (WRC) Act 2009, helped the event run through the area to the standard required by the Fédération Internationale de l'Automobile.

Many residents objected to the legislation and also felt that the event was incompatible with the Northern Rivers' social fabric and reputation as an ecotourism destination. As a result, the 2009 event was marked by significant public protests in the lead-up to and during the event. Two stages were abandoned due to protest activities where rocks were allegedly laid on the road prior to the cars coming through the stage. A stage marshall claimed protesters had thrown rocks at rally cars, resulting in worldwide media reports and an outcry against protesters.

In September 2010, as controversy over the event continued in local communities, the Australian motorsport administrative body, the Confederation of Australian Motor Sports (CAMS), which owns Rally Australia, announced that the rally would relocate to Coffs Harbour, where there is an established rally event, the Coffs Coast Rally.

Rally Australia Chairman Alan Evans stated that the event's departure from the Northern Rivers marks the first time a leg of the WRC has ever been relocated due to residents' concerns.

The 2011 Rally Australia event was run successfully at Coffs Harbour under the stewardship of Ben Rainsford as Chairman and Michael Masi as Chief Executive.

== Winners ==
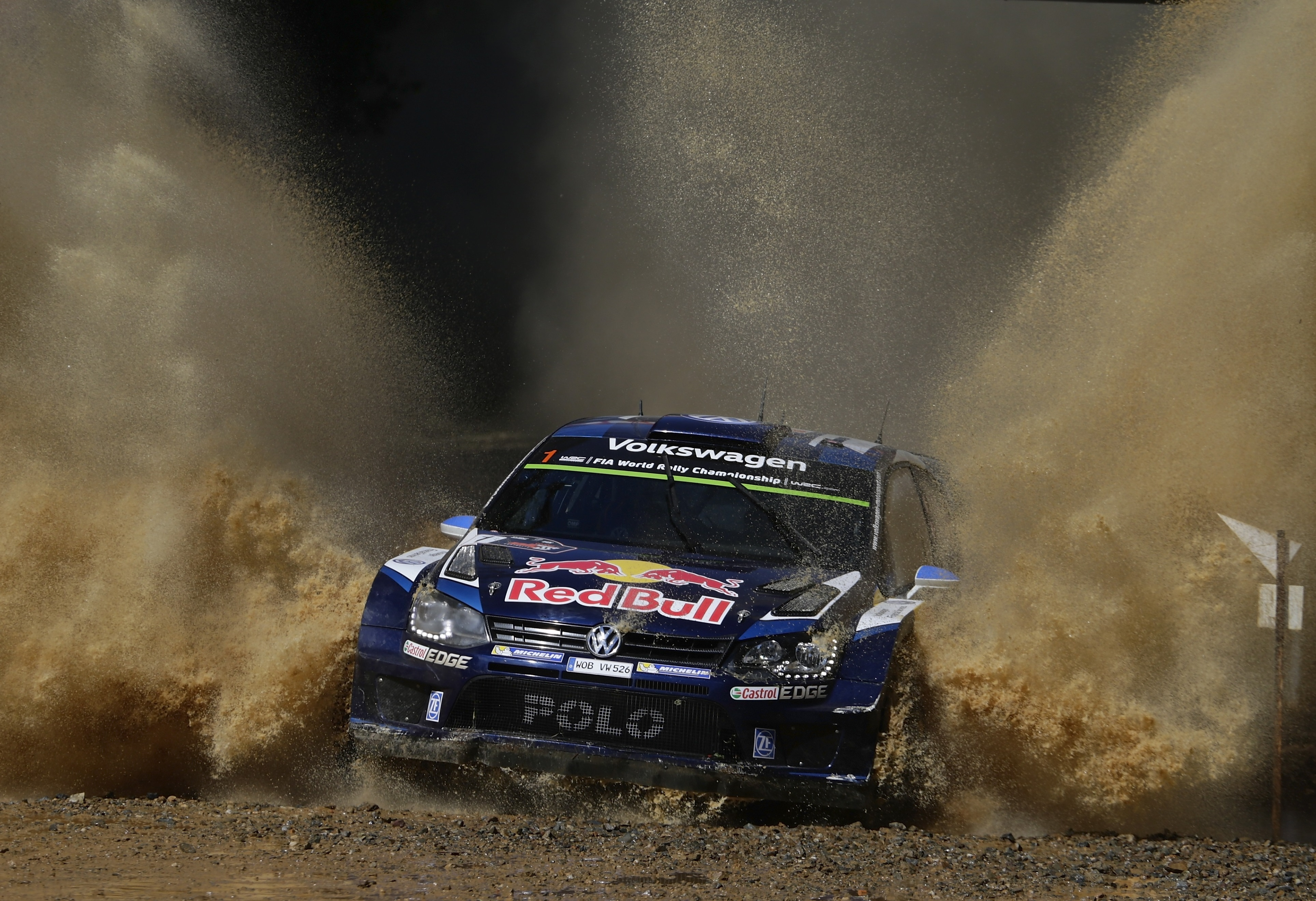
Sébastien Ogier in 2015

Season	Driver	Co-driver	Car	Location	Event report
1988	(Sweden) Ingvar Carlsson	(Sweden) Per Carlsson	(Japan) Mazda 323 4WD	Perth	Report
1989	(Finland) Juha Kankkunen	(Finland) Juha Piironen	(Japan) Toyota Celica GT-Four ST165	Perth	Report
1990	(Finland) Juha Kankkunen	(Finland) Juha Piironen	(Italy) Lancia Delta Integrale 16V	Perth	Report
1991	(Finland) Juha Kankkunen	(Finland) Juha Piironen	(Italy) Lancia Delta Integrale 16V	Perth	Report
1992	(France) Didier Auriol	(France) Bernard Occelli	(Italy) Lancia Delta HF Integrale	Perth	Report
1993	(Finland) Juha Kankkunen	(United Kingdom) Nicky Grist	(Japan) Toyota Celica GT-Four ST185	Perth	Report
1994	(United Kingdom) Colin McRae	(United Kingdom) Derek Ringer	(Japan) Subaru Impreza 555	Perth	Report ^{[A]}
1995	(Sweden) Kenneth Eriksson	(Sweden) Staffan Parmander	(Japan) Mitsubishi Lancer Evolution III	Perth	Report
1996	(Finland) Tommi Mäkinen	(Finland) Seppo Harjanne	(Japan) Mitsubishi Lancer Evolution III	Perth	Report
1997	(United Kingdom) Colin McRae	(United Kingdom) Nicky Grist	(Japan) Subaru Impreza WRC 97	Perth	Report
1998	(Finland) Tommi Mäkinen	(Finland) Risto Mannisenmäki	(Japan) Mitsubishi Lancer Evolution V	Perth	Report
1999	(United Kingdom) Richard Burns	(United Kingdom) Robert Reid	(Japan) Subaru Impreza WRC 99	Perth	Report
2000	(Finland) Marcus Grönholm	(Finland) Timo Rautiainen	(France) Peugeot 206 WRC	Perth	Report
2001	(Finland) Marcus Grönholm	(Finland) Timo Rautiainen	(France) Peugeot 206 WRC	Perth	Report
2002	(Finland) Marcus Grönholm	(Finland) Timo Rautiainen	(France) Peugeot 206 WRC	Perth	Report
2003	(Norway) Petter Solberg	(United Kingdom) Phil Mills	(Japan) Subaru Impreza WRC 2003	Perth	Report
2004	(France) Sébastien Loeb	(Monaco) Daniel Elena	(France) Citroën Xsara WRC	Perth	Report
2005	(Belgium) François Duval	(Belgium) Sven Smeets	(France) Citroën Xsara WRC	Perth	Report
2006	(Finland) Mikko Hirvonen	(Finland) Jarmo Lehtinen	(United Kingdom) Ford Focus RS WRC 06	Perth	Report
2009	(Finland) Mikko Hirvonen	(Finland) Jarmo Lehtinen	(United Kingdom) Ford Focus RS WRC 09	Kingscliff	Report
2011	(Finland) Mikko Hirvonen	(Finland) Jarmo Lehtinen	(United Kingdom) Ford Fiesta RS WRC	Coffs Harbour	Report
2013	(France) Sébastien Ogier	(France) Julien Ingrassia	(Germany) Volkswagen Polo R WRC	Coffs Harbour	Report
2014	(France) Sébastien Ogier	(France) Julien Ingrassia	(Germany) Volkswagen Polo R WRC	Coffs Harbour	Report
2015	(France) Sébastien Ogier	(France) Julien Ingrassia	(Germany) Volkswagen Polo R WRC	Coffs Harbour	Report
2016	(Norway) Andreas Mikkelsen	(Norway) Anders Jæger	(Germany) Volkswagen Polo R WRC	Coffs Harbour	Report
2017	(Belgium) Thierry Neuville	(Belgium) Nicolas Gilsoul	(South Korea) Hyundai i20 Coupe WRC	Coffs Harbour	Report
2018	(Finland) Jari-Matti Latvala	(Finland) Miikka Anttila	(Japan) Toyota Yaris WRC	Coffs Harbour	Report
2019	Event cancelled			Coffs Harbour	Report

=== Notes ===
^{A} Due to the World Rally Championship round rotation, the 1994 rally counted only for the 2-litre World Cup.

=== Multiple winners ===
Wins	Driver
4	(Finland) Juha Kankkunen
3	(Finland) Marcus Grönholm
3	(Finland) Mikko Hirvonen
3	(France) Sebastien Ogier
2	(Finland) Tommi Mäkinen
2	(United Kingdom) Colin McRae

Wins	Manufacturers
4	(Japan) Subaru
4	(Germany) Volkswagen
3	(Italy) Lancia
3	(Japan) Mitsubishi
3	(France) Peugeot
3	(United States) Ford
3	(Japan) Toyota
2	(France) Citroën

== See also ==
- Motorsport in Australia
- List of Australian motor racing series
