= Mark Hales =

British racing driver (born 1950)

- Nationality: (United Kingdom) British
- Born: 7 November 1950 (age 76) Birmingham, England

British Saloon / Touring Car Championship
- Years active: 1983, 1985–1988, 1990–1991
- Teams: Terry Drury Racing; Chris Hodgetts Motor Sport; Arquati Racing Team; ICS plc MIL Motorsport; John Maguire Racing
- Starts: 58
- Wins: 0 (8 in class)
- Poles: 0
- Fastest laps: 7
- Best finish: 2nd in 1987

Championship titles
- 1987: British Touring Car Championship - Class B

Mark Hales (born 7 November 1950) is a British auto racing driver and instructor. He is best known for finishing as runner-up in the 1987 British Touring Car Championship season.

== Career ==
Hales was a class B winner in 1987 with his Ford Escort RS Turbo. He switched to the Group N Production Championship in 1988, winning his class in a Ford Sierra in 1989. This led to him being hired for the 1990 BTCC by John McGuire Racing team, running a works backed Mitsubishi Starion. His final season in the BTCC was in 1991. He stayed with Mitsubishi, and was the sole driver for the works driver. He competed in a Mitsubishi Lancer in the first part of the season, switching to a Mitsubishi Galant for the second part. He got one championship point at Snetterton. He raced in the TVR Tuscan championship in 1993 and 1994, winning the title in both seasons for Team Rallytech. Most recently he has competed in historic racing, winning the Historic Six Hours of Spa in 2004. He was also a contributor and track-tester for the British motorracing magazines Evo and Octane. He also writes for the Daily Telegraph, and has published a book co-written by Nick Mason, called Into The Red.

== Racing record ==
=== Complete British Saloon / Touring Car Championship results ===
(key) (Races in bold indicate pole position – 1973–1990 in class) (Races in italics indicate fastest lap – 1 point awarded ?–1989 in class)

Year	Team	Car	Class	1	2	3	4	5	6	7	8	9	10	11	12	13	14	15	DC	Pts	Class
1983	Mark Hales	Ford Capri III 3.0S	A	SIL	OUL	THR	BRH	THR	SIL	DON	SIL ovr:19 cls:11	DON	BRH	SIL					NC	0	NC
1985	Terry Drury Racing	Alfa Romeo GTV6	B	SIL	OUL	THR	DON	THR	SIL	DON ovr:10 cls:4	SIL ovr:8 cls:3	SNE ovr:9 cls:5	BRH	BRH	SIL				19th	9	6th
1986	Terry Drury Racing	Ford Escort RS Turbo	B	SIL; Ret	THR; Ret	SIL; Ret	DON; Ret	BRH ovr:18 cls:5	SNE ovr:5 cls:3	BRH ovr:10 cls:4	DON ovr:5 cls:1	SIL; Ret							12th	20	5th
1987	Terry Drury Racing	Ford Escort RS Turbo	B	SIL ovr:7 cls:1	OUL ovr:7 cls:1	THR ovr:8 cls:1	THR ovr:9 cls:1	SIL ovr:8 cls:1	SIL; Ret	BRH ovr:14 cls:2	SNE; Ret	DON ovr:10 cls:4	OUL ovr:7‡ cls:1‡	DON ovr:9 cls:3					**2nd**	**51**	**1st**
1987	Chris Hodgetts Motor Sport	Toyota Corolla GT	D												SIL ovr:9† cls:1†				**2nd**	**51**	NC
1988	Chris Hodgetts Motor Sport	Toyota Corolla GT	D	SIL	OUL ovr:11 cls:2	THR	DON ovr:21 cls:5	THR	SIL; DNS										30th	8	6th
1988	Arquati Racing Team	Ford Sierra RS500	A				DON; Ret‡												30th	8	NC
1988	ICS plc	Ford Sierra RS500	A													SIL; Ret			30th	8	NC
1988	MIL Motorsport	Toyota Supra Turbo	A							SIL; Ret	BRH; NC	SNE ovr:11 cls:9	BRH	BIR; DNQ	DON ovr:18 cls:13				30th	8	NC
1990	John Maguire Racing	Mitsubishi Starion	B	OUL; Ret	DON; Ret	THR; Ret	SIL; Ret	OUL ovr:16 cls:8	SIL ovr:17 cls:10	BRH ovr:9 cls:6	SNE ovr:9 cls:4	BRH ovr:15 cls:9	BIR ovr:12 cls:7	DON ovr:15 cls:9	THR ovr:17 cls:12	SIL; Ret			18th	28	11th
1991	John Maguire Racing	Mitsubishi Lancer		SIL; 17	SNE; 10	DON; 16	THR; 16	SIL; DNS	BRH	SIL									23rd	1	
1991	John Maguire Racing	Mitsubishi Galant									DON; 1; 14	DON; 2 Ret	OUL; 14	BRH; 1; 13	BRH; 2 Ret	DON; Ret	THR; 11	SIL; Ret	23rd	1	

‡ Endurance driver.

† Ineligible for points.

=== Complete European Touring Car Championship results ===
(key) (Races in bold indicate pole position) (Races in italics indicate fastest lap)

Year	Team	Car	1	2	3	4	5	6	7	8	9	10	11	DC	Pts
1988	(United Kingdom) Arquati UK Ltd	Ford Sierra RS500	MNZ	DON	EST	JAR	DIJ	VAL	NÜR	SPA	ZOL	SIL; 12	NOG	NC	0
