= Ingvar Carlsson (rally driver) =

Swedish rally driver (1947–2009)

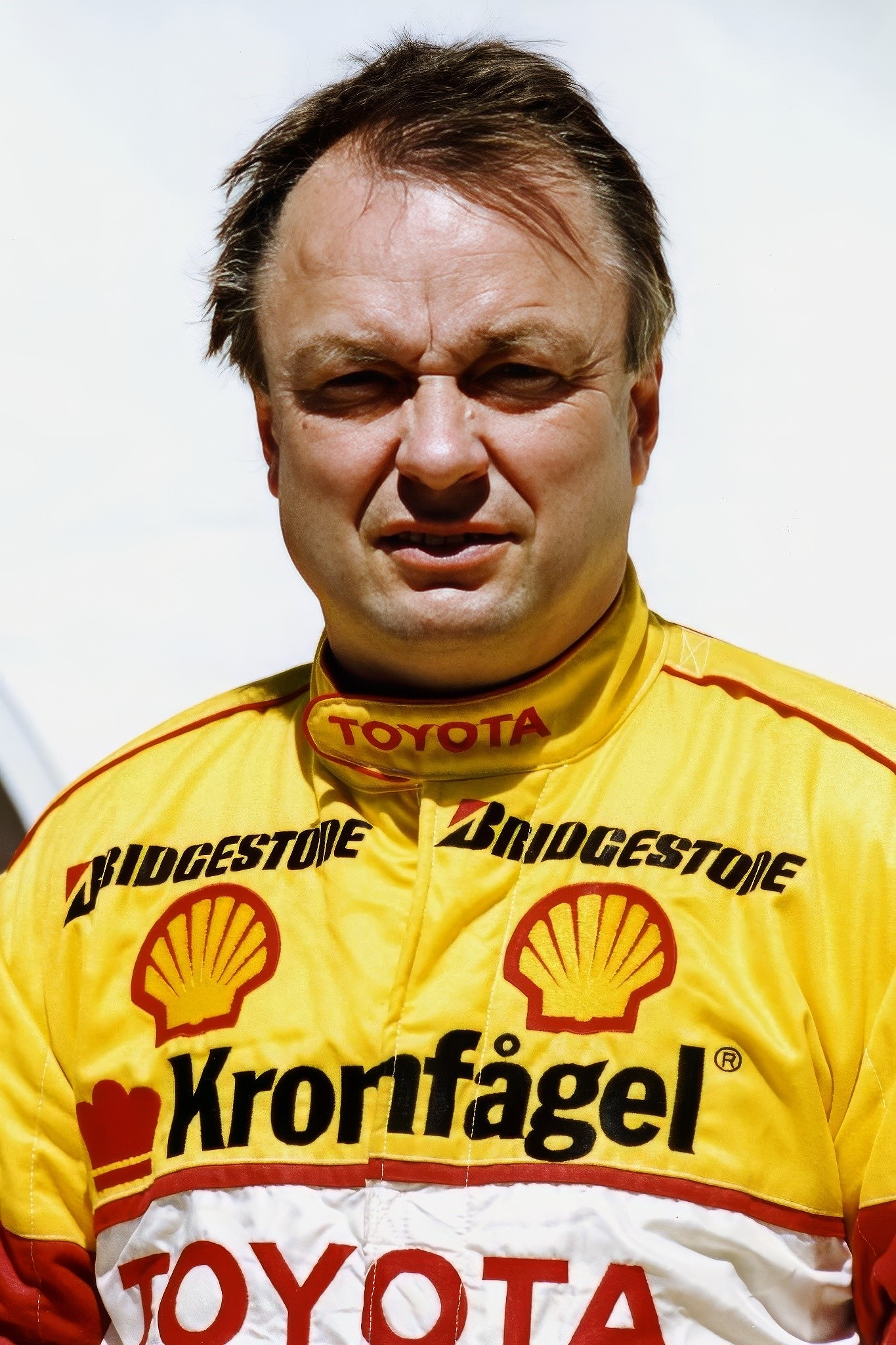
- Carlsson pictured in 1995

Personal information
- Nationality: (Sweden) Swedish
- Born: 2 April 1947; Nyköping, Sweden
- Died: 28 October 2009 (aged 62); Nyköping

World Rally Championship record
- Years active: 1974 – 1991
- Co-driver: (Sweden) Sölve Andreasson (Sweden) Bo Reinicke (Sweden) Claes Billstam (Sweden) Roine Hasselberg (Sweden) Christian Bodén (Sweden) Ragnar Spjuth (Sweden) Benny Melander (Sweden) Jan-Olof Bohlin (Sweden) Per Carlsson
- Teams: Datsun, Fiat, BMW, Mercedes, Mazda
- Rallies: 42
- Championships: 0
- Rally wins: 2
- Podiums: 4
- Stage wins: 56
- Total points: 125
- First rally: 1974 Rally de Portugal
- First win: 1989 Swedish Rally
- Last rally: 1991 Rally Australia

FIA ERX Division 1 Championship
- Years active: 1994–1996
- Former teams: Christer Bohlin Motorsport
- Starts: 24
- Wins: 1
- Podiums: 6
- Best finish: 4th in 1996

Per Allan Ingvar Carlsson (2 April 1947 in Nyköping – 28 October 2009 in Nyköping) was a Swedish rally driver, who won two World Rally Championship events in 1989.

== Career ==
Carlsson began his rallying career in 1966, competing in national rallies in a Volvo PV544. He won his fourth rally. Carlsson's first World Rally Championship (WRC) event came in 1974, when he drove a works Datsun 260Z on Rally de Portugal. He then drove for Fiat in an Abarth 124 on that year's RAC Rally and the 1975 Swedish Rally, where he finished fifth, ahead of teammate Markku Alen. He then spent many years driving for BMW, although he also drove for Mercedes in 1980, gaining a fifth place in Rally de Portugal as his best finish.

In 1984, Carlsson joined Mazda, initially playing a key role in developing the rear-wheel drive Group B RX-7. In 1987, Mazda introduced the Group A 323 4WD. Following the prohibition of Group B, Carlsson found himself with a competitive advantage due to his extensive experience in lesser-powered cars. Carlsson took his first WRC victory on the opening round of the 1989 season in Sweden, and also went on to win Rally New Zealand later in the year. At the end of 1991, Mazda pulled the plug on its rally programme and Carlsson retired from the WRC. He also drove for Toyota in the FIA European Rallycross Championship in 1995 (with teammate Gunde Svan) and 1996. He finished fifth in 1995 and fourth in 1996.

== Death ==
Ingvar Carlsson died on 28 October 2009, aged 62.

== WRC victories ==
#	Event	Season	Co-driver	Car
1	(Sweden) 39th Swedish Rally	1989	Per Carlsson	Mazda 323 4WD
2	19th Rally New Zealand	1989	Per Carlsson	Mazda 323 4WD

== Racing record ==
=== Complete FIA European Rallycross Championship results ===
==== Division 1 ====
Year	Entrant	Car	1	2	3	4	5	6	7	8	9	10	11	12	ERX	Points
1994	Christer Bohlin Motorsport	Toyota Celica Turbo 4WD	AUT	POR	FRA	IRE	GBR	SWE	FIN	BEL	NED	NOR	GER; 7		24th	10
1995	Christer Bohlin Motorsport	Toyota Celica GT-Four	AUT; 4	POR; 2	FRA; 5	SWE (7)	GBR (11)	IRE (NC)	BEL; 2	NED; 5	NOR; 2	FIN; 3	CZE; 6	GER (6)	5th	114
1996	Christer Bohlin Motorsport	Toyota Celica GT-Four	AUT; 6	POR; 5	FRA (11)	SWE (NC)	IRE (7)	GBR (11)	BEL; 2	NED; 5	NOR; 4	CZE; 4	GER; 1		4th	98
