= Mazda Rally Team Europe =

Professional rally race team from Belgium

MRT/E, Mazda
- Full name: Mazda Rally Team Europe
- Base: Brussels, Belgium
- Team principal(s): Achim Warmbold
- Drivers: see below
- Chassis: Mazda 323 GTX; Mazda RX-7 Rally; Mazda Familia 4WD
- Tyres: Michelin; Pirelli

World Rally Championship history
- Debut: 1985
- Manufacturers' Championships: 0
- Drivers' Championships: 0
- Rally wins: 3

The Mazda Rally Team Europe was a rally team created by Achim Warmbold that competed in the World Rally Championship from 1985 to 1992.

== History ==
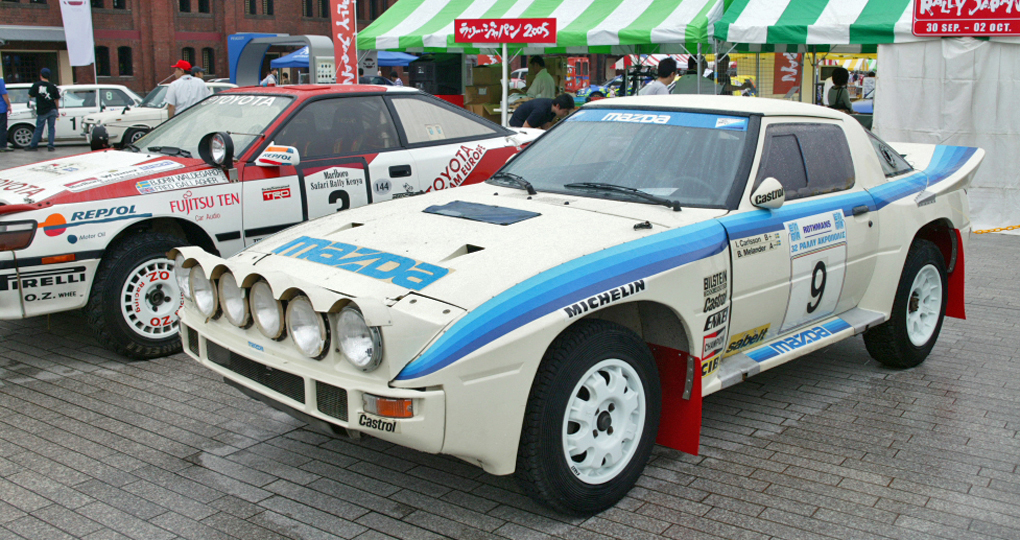
Group B Mazda RX-7

The Mazda Rally Team Europe was created by Achim Warmbold as European Mazda preparation business based in Brussels, Belgium. Mazda headquarters appeared to ignore it. Although eventually Warmbold gained their attention, this did not seem to help the project much at first. Warmbold first created a Group A Mazda 323. This 323 was old fashioned and front wheel drive, but did feature a turbo engine. The 323 was short lived as it was only a warm-up for a Group B Mazda RX-7 with a Wankel engine. It managed to get a podium in the 1985 Acropolis Rally.

=== Group A ===
The first Group A model was based on the BF 323 with a turbo engine and 4WD. The timing of this project could not have been more perfect: the 323 4WD Turbo debuted in the 1986 Monte Carlo Rally. While this was before the Group B accidents at the Rally Portugal and the Tour de Corse, its launch was only one year away from the ban of Group B and by the time Group A became the main WRC class, only Mazda had a well proven 4x4 turbo car. With Ingvar Carlsson and Timo Salonen at the wheel, the BF 323 GT-X brought Mazda three wins in the World Rally Championship.

The new 5th generation BG 323 GT-X was debuted midway through the 1990 season at the 1000 Lakes Rally The new model was much improved over its predecessor, its enlarged 1839cc engine, canted forward so as to provide greater freedom to locate the Xtrac transmission. It was also wider, offered improved suspension travel and had better thermal management, even if the addition of so many grilles lent the GT-X a somewhat fussy frontal appearance. Mazda's driver line-up was also improving what with the team's stalwart; Finns Hannu Mikkola and Timo Salonen now supported by Ingvar Carlsson and, from time to time, Gregoire de Mevius and Jesus Puras. But it wasn't to be. The frenetic, relentless pace of Group A development meant that while the GT-X was a marked improvement over what had gone before, it was still behind Lancia and Toyota and Ford.

The new, larger engine gave more power, but its 275bhp still wasn't enough, especially when mated to an intercooler deemed too small and too inefficient for WRC. Nor was it especially reliable, as evidenced by a rash of retirements following its Finnish debut. More power was extracted through a change of ECU supplier. Come the start of the 1991 season, and the Mazda outfit had also Timo Salonen to Mitsubishi however Carlsson, Puras and Rod Millen remained as did a young Finn called Tommi Makinen. The latter would actually deliver Mazda its best result of the year with drive to fifth on Rally Finland, but that was the only bright spot on otherwise frustrating WRC year.

Mazda withdrew its factory team from WRC programme at the end of the 1992 season, just as the BG 323 GT-R homologation run had been completed for 1993 as a replacement for the GT-X. MRTE built five Group A cars in 1992, one of which went to Bjorn Johansson and Mazda's Swedish rally arm who bought the team from Mazda. The 323 GT-R was run by several privateer teams from 1993 onwards, its best results being a 5th place in 1993 and second place in 1994, both at Rally Sweden.

The capability of the GT-R was further demonstrated by its success in Group N, in which guise Alex Fassina scooped the FIA Production Cup.

== Drivers ==
- Philippe Wambergue (1984)
- Minna Sillankorva (1984)
- Achim Warmbold (1984–1986)
- Rod Millen (1985)
- Ingvar Carlsson (1985–1990)
- Timo Salonen (1987–1990)
- Hannu Mikkola (1988–1991)
- Grégoire De Mévius (1990)
- Jesús Puras (1991)
- Tommi Mäkinen (1991)

== Group B era (1984-1985) ==
| Year | Car | Driver | 1 | 2 | 3 | 4 | 5 | 6 | 7 | 8 | 9 | 10 | 11 | 12 | WDC | Points | WMC | Points |
|---|---|---|---|---|---|---|---|---|---|---|---|---|---|---|---|---|---|---|
| 1984 | Mazda RX-7 | (Sweden) Ingvar Carlsson | MON | SWE | POR | KEN | FRA | GRC; Ret | ARG | BRA | FIN | ITA | CIV | GBR; Ret | - | 0 | 14th | 2 |
| 1984 | Mazda RX-7 | (Germany) Achim Warmbold | MON | SWE | POR | KEN | FRA | GRC; 9 | ARG | BRA | FIN | ITA | CIV | GBR | 53rd | 2 | 14th | 2 |
| 1984 | Mazda RX-7 | (France) Philippe Wambergue | MON | SWE | POR | KEN | FRA | GRC | ARG | BRA | FIN | ITA | CIV | GBR; Ret | - | 0 | 14th | 2 |
| 1985 | Mazda RX-7 | (Sweden) Ingvar Carlsson | MON | SWE; 8 | POR | KEN | FRA | GRC; 3 | NZL | ARG | FIN | ITA | CIV | GBR; 10 | 16th | 16 | 10th | 22 |
| 1985 | Mazda RX-7 | (Germany) Achim Warmbold | MON | SWE | POR | KEN | FRA | GRC; 6 | NZL | ARG | FIN | ITA | CIV | GBR | 34th | 6 | 10th | 22 |
| 1985 | Mazda RX-7 | (New Zealand) Mike Montgomery | MON | SWE | POR | KEN | FRA | GRC | NZL; 11 | ARG | FIN | ITA | CIV | GBR | 60th | 2 | 10th | 22 |
| 1985 | Mazda RX-7 | (New Zealand) Neil Allport | MON | SWE | POR | KEN | FRA | GRC | NZL; Ret | ARG | FIN | ITA | CIV | GBR | - | 0 | 10th | 22 |
| 1985 | Mazda RX-7 | (New Zealand) Stuart Eyre | MON | SWE | POR | KEN | FRA | GRC | NZL; Ret | ARG | FIN | ITA | CIV | GBR | - | 0 | 10th | 22 |
| 1985 | Mazda RX-7 | (Finland) Minna Sillankorva | MON | SWE | POR | KEN | FRA | GRC | NZL | ARG | FIN; Ret | ITA | CIV | GBR | - | 0 | 10th | 22 |
| 1985 | Mazda RX-7 | (New Zealand) Rod Millen | MON | SWE | POR | KEN | FRA | GRC | NZL | ARG | FIN | ITA | CIV | GBR; 9 | 60th | 2 | 10th | 22 |

== Group A era (1986-1991) ==
| Year | Car | Driver | 1 | 2 | 3 | 4 | 5 | 6 | 7 | 8 | 9 | 10 | 11 | 12 | 13 | 14 | WDC | Points | WMC | Points |
|---|---|---|---|---|---|---|---|---|---|---|---|---|---|---|---|---|---|---|---|---|
| 1986 | Mazda 323 4WD | (Sweden) Ingvar Carlsson | MON; Ret | SWE; Ret | POR | KEN | FRA | GRE | NZL | ARG | FIN; Ret | CIV | ITA | GBR; 10 | USA | | 70th | 1 | 11th | 9 |
| 1986 | Mazda 323 4WD | (Germany) Achim Warmbold | MON; Ret | SWE | POR | KEN | FRA | GRE | NZL | ARG | FIN | CIV | ITA | GBR | USA | | - | 0 | 11th | 9 |
| 1986 | Mazda 323 4WD | (New Zealand) Rod Millen | MON | SWE | POR | KEN | FRA | GRE | NZL; 7 | ARG | FIN | CIV | ITA | GBR | USA; 10 | | 44th | 5 | 11th | 9 |
| 1987 | Mazda 323 4WD | (Finland) Timo Salonen | MON; Ret | SWE; 1 | POR; Ret | KEN | FRA | GRE | USA | NZL | ARG | FIN; Ret | CIV | ITA | GBR | | 14th | 20 | 6th | 52 |
| 1987 | Mazda 323 4WD | (Sweden) Ingvar Carlsson | MON; 4 | SWE; 4 | POR; Ret | KEN | FRA | GRE | USA | NZL | ARG; Ret | FIN; Ret | CIV | ITA | GBR | | 17th | 20 | 6th | 52 |
| 1987 | Mazda 323 4WD | (New Zealand) Rod Millen | MON | SWE | POR | KEN | FRA | GRE | USA; 4 | NZL | ARG | FIN | CIV | ITA | GBR | | 26th | 10 | 6th | 52 |
| 1988 | Mazda 323 4WD | (Finland) Timo Salonen | MON; 5 | SWE; Ret | POR | KEN | FRA | GRC; Ret | USA | NZL | ARG | FIN; 4 | CIV | ITA | GBR; 2 | | 5th | 33 | 4th | 66 |
| 1988 | Mazda 323 4WD | (Finland) Hannu Mikkola | MON; Ret | SWE; Ret | POR; 4 | KEN | FRA | GRC; Ret | USA | NZL | ARG | FIN; Ret | CIV | ITA | GBR; Ret | | 30th | 10 | 4th | 66 |
| 1988 | Mazda 323 4WD | (Sweden) Ingvar Carlsson | MON; Ret | SWE | POR; Ret | KEN | FRA | GRC | USA | NZL | ARG | FIN | CIV | ITA | GBR | | - | 0 | 4th | 66 |
| 1988 | Mazda 323 4WD | (New Zealand) Ray Wilson | MON | SWE | POR | KEN | FRA | GRC | USA | NZL; 2 | ARG | FIN | CIV | ITA | GBR | | 18th | 15 | 4th | 66 |
| 1988 | Mazda 323 4WD | (New Zealand) Rod Millen | MON | SWE | POR | KEN | FRA | GRC | USA; 8 | NZL | ARG | FIN | CIV | ITA | GBR | | 59th | 3 | 4th | 66 |
| 1989 | Mazda 323 4WD | (Sweden) Ingvar Carlsson | SWE; 1 | MON | POR | KEN | FRA | GRC | NZL; 1 | ARG | FIN | AUS; Ret | ITA | CIV | GBR; 8 | | 7th | 43 | 3rd | 67 |
| 1989 | Mazda 323 4WD | (Finland) Timo Salonen | SWE; 22 | MON; Ret | POR | KEN | FRA | GRC | NZL | ARG | FIN; 2 | AUS | ITA | CIV | GBR; 6 | | 12th | 21 | 3rd | 67 |
| 1989 | Mazda 323 4WD | (Sweden) Thorbjörn Edling | SWE; Ret | MON | POR | KEN | FRA | GRC | NZL | ARG | FIN; 5 | AUS | ITA | CIV | GBR | | 34th | 8 | 3rd | 67 |
| 1989 | Mazda 323 4WD | (Finland) Mikael Sundström | SWE; Ret | MON | POR | KEN | FRA | GRC | NZL | ARG | FIN; Ret | AUS | ITA | CIV | GBR; 7 | | 52nd | 4 | 3rd | 67 |
| 1989 | Mazda 323 4WD | (Finland) Hannu Mikkola | SWE | MON; 4 | POR | KEN | FRA | GRC | NZL | ARG | FIN; Ret | AUS | ITA | CIV | GBR; 9 | | 27th | 12 | 3rd | 67 |
| 1989 | Mazda 323 4WD | (New Zealand) Rod Millen | SWE | MON | POR | KEN | FRA | GRC | NZL; 2 | ARG | FIN | AUS; 5 | ITA | CIV | GBR | | 11th | 23 | 3rd | 67 |
| 1989 | Mazda 323 4WD | (New Zealand) Ray Wilson | SWE | MON | POR | KEN | FRA | GRC | NZL; 7 | ARG | FIN | AUS; Ret | ITA | CIV | GBR | | 52nd | 4 | 3rd | 67 |
| 1990 | Mazda 323 4WD Mazda 323 GTX | (Finland) Timo Salonen | MON; 8 | POR; Ret | KEN | FRA | GRC | NZL | ARG | FIN; 6 | AUS | ITA | CIV | GBR; Ret | | | 25th | 9 | 5th | 30 |
| 1990 | Mazda 323 4WD Mazda 323 GTX | (Finland) Hannu Mikkola | MON; Ret | POR; 6 | KEN | FRA | GRC | NZL | ARG | FIN; Ret | AUS | ITA | CIV | GBR; Ret | | | 34th | 6 | 5th | 30 |
| 1990 | Mazda 323 4WD Mazda 323 GTX | (Belgium) Grégoire de Mevius | MON | POR; Ret | KEN | FRA | GRC | NZL | ARG | FIN | AUS; 6 | ITA; Ret | CIV | GBR | | | 34th | 6 | 5th | 30 |
| 1990 | Mazda 323 4WD Mazda 323 GTX | (Sweden) Ingvar Carlsson | MON | POR | KEN | FRA | GRC | NZL; 2 | ARG | FIN | AUS; 5 | ITA | CIV | GBR | | | 10th | 23 | 5th | 30 |
| 1990 | Mazda 323 4WD Mazda 323 GTX | (New Zealand) Rod Millen | MON | POR | KEN | FRA | GRC | NZL; Ret | ARG | FIN | AUS; Ret | ITA | CIV | GBR | | | - | 0 | 5th | 30 |
| 1990 | Mazda 323 4WD Mazda 323 GTX | (Finland) Mikael Sundström | MON | POR | KEN | FRA | GRC | NZL | ARG | FIN; Ret | AUS | ITA | CIV | GBR; Ret | | | - | 0 | 5th | 30 |
| 1991 | Mazda 323 GTX | (Finland) Hannu Mikkola | MON; Ret | SWE; 7 | POR; Ret | KEN | FRA | GRC; 8 | NZL | ARG | FIN; Ret | AUS | ITA | CIV | ESP | GBR; 7 | 25th | 11 | 5th | 44 |
| 1991 | Mazda 323 GTX | (Spain) Jesús Puras | MON; Ret | SWE | POR; 7 | KEN | FRA | GRC | NZL | ARG | FIN | AUS | ITA | CIV | ESP | GBR | 40th | 4 | 5th | 44 |
| 1991 | Mazda 323 GTX | (Sweden) Ingvar Carlsson | MON | SWE; 4 | POR | KEN | FRA | GRC | NZL; 8 | ARG | FIN | AUS; Ret | ITA | CIV | ESP | GBR | 16th | 13 | 5th | 44 |
| 1991 | Mazda 323 GTX | (New Zealand) Rod Millen | MON | SWE | POR | KEN | FRA | GRC | NZL; 6 | ARG | FIN | AUS; 6 | ITA | CIV | ESP | GBR | 23rd | 12 | 5th | 44 |
| 1991 | Mazda 323 GTX | (Finland) Tommi Mäkinen | MON | SWE | POR | KEN | FRA | GRC | NZL | ARG | FIN; 5 | AUS | ITA | CIV | ESP | GBR; Ret | 29th | 8 | 5th | 44 |
