= Subaru World Rally Team WRC results =

The table below shows all results of Subaru World Rally Team in World Rally Championship.

Year	Car	No	Driver	1	2	3	4	5	6	7	8	9	10	11	12	13	14	15	16	WDC	Points	WMC	Points
1990	Subaru Legacy RS		(Finland) Markku Alén	MON	POR	KEN; Ret	FRA	GRE; Ret	NZL	ARG	FIN; 4	AUS	ITA; Ret	CIV	GBR; Ret					20th	10	4th	43
1990	Subaru Legacy RS		(Kenya) Jim Heather-Hayes	MON	POR	KEN; 6	FRA	GRE	NZL	ARG	FIN	AUS	ITA	CIV	GBR					34th	6	4th	43
1990	Subaru Legacy RS		(Kenya) Mike Kirkland	MON	POR	KEN; Ret	FRA	GRE	NZL; Ret	ARG	FIN	AUS	ITA	CIV	GBR					-	0	4th	43
1990	Subaru Legacy RS		(New Zealand) Peter 'Possum' Bourne	MON	POR	KEN; Ret	FRA	GRE	NZL; 5	ARG	FIN	AUS; 4	ITA	CIV	GBR					14th	18	4th	43
1990	Subaru Legacy RS		(Kenya) Ian Duncan	MON	POR	KEN; Ret	FRA	GRE; 8	NZL	ARG	FIN	AUS	ITA	CIV	GBR					47th	3	4th	43
1990	Subaru Legacy RS		(France) François Chatriot	MON	POR	KEN	FRA	GRE	NZL	ARG	FIN	AUS	ITA; Ret	CIV	GBR					-	0	4th	43
1990	Subaru Legacy RS		(United Kingdom) Derek Warwick	MON	POR	KEN	FRA	GRE	NZL	ARG	FIN	AUS	ITA	CIV	GBR; Ret					-	0	4th	43
1991	Subaru Legacy RS		(Finland) Markku Alén	MON	SWE; 3	POR; 5	KEN	FRA	GRE; Ret	NZL; 4	ARG	FIN; Ret	AUS; 4	ITA	CIV	ESP	GBR; Ret			8th	40	6th	42
1991	Subaru Legacy RS		(France) François Chatriot	MON	SWE; 19	POR; 6	KEN	FRA; 9	GRE	NZL	ARG	FIN	AUS	ITA	CIV	ESP	GBR			33rd	8	6th	42
1991	Subaru Legacy RS		(New Zealand) Peter 'Possum' Bourne	MON	SWE	POR	KEN	FRA	GRE	NZL; Ret	ARG	FIN	AUS; Ret	ITA	CIV	ESP	GBR			-	0	6th	42
1991	Subaru Legacy RS		(Finland) Ari Vatanen	MON	SWE	POR	KEN	FRA	GRE	NZL	ARG	FIN	AUS	ITA	CIV	ESP	GBR; 5			22nd	12	6th	42
1991	Subaru Legacy RS		(Scotland) Colin McRae	MON	SWE	POR	KEN	FRA	GRE	NZL	ARG	FIN	AUS	ITA	CIV	ESP	GBR; Ret			-	0	6th	42
1992	Subaru Legacy RS		(Finland) Ari Vatanen	MON	SWE; Ret	POR	KEN	FRA	GRC; Ret	NZL; Ret	ARG	FIN; 4	AUS; Ret	ITA	CIV	ESP	GBR; 2			11th	25	4th	60
1992	Subaru Legacy RS		(Scotland) Colin McRae	MON	SWE; 2	POR	KEN	FRA	GRC; 4	NZL; Ret	ARG	FIN; 8	AUS	ITA	CIV	ESP	GBR; 6			8th	34	4th	60
1992	Subaru Legacy RS		(Sweden) Per Eklund	MON	SWE; 6	POR	KEN; 9	FRA	GRC	NZL	ARG	FIN	AUS	ITA	CIV	ESP	GBR; 12			32nd	8	4th	60
1992	Subaru Legacy RS		(Kenya) Patrick Njiru	MON	SWE	POR	KEN; 8	FRA	GRC	NZL	ARG	FIN	AUS	ITA	CIV	ESP	GBR			49th	3	4th	60
1992	Subaru Legacy RS		(Australia) Peter 'Possum' Bourne	MON	SWE	POR	KEN	FRA	GRC	NZL; Ret	ARG	FIN	AUS; 6	ITA	CIV	ESP	GBR			34th	6	4th	60
1992	Subaru Legacy RS		(Australia) Rob Herridge	MON	SWE	POR	KEN	FRA	GRC	NZL	ARG	FIN	AUS; Ret	ITA	CIV	ESP	GBR			-	0	4th	60
1993	Subaru Legacy RS		(Scotland) Colin McRae	MON	SWE; 3	POR; 7		FRA; 5	GRC; Ret	ARG	NZL; 1	FIN	AUS; 6	ITA	ESP					5th	50	3rd	112
1993	Subaru Vivio Sedan 4WD		(Scotland) Colin McRae				KEN; Ret													5th	50	3rd	112
1993	Subaru Impreza 555		(Scotland) Colin McRae													GBR; Ret				5th	50	3rd	112
1993	Subaru Legacy RS		(Finland) Hannu Mikkola	MON	SWE; Ret	POR	KEN	FRA	GRC	ARG	NZL	FIN	AUS	ITA	ESP	GBR				38th*	4*	3rd	112
1993	Subaru Legacy RS		(Sweden) Per Eklund	MON	SWE; 6	POR	KEN	FRA	GRC	ARG	NZL	FIN	AUS	ITA	ESP	GBR				31st	6	3rd	112
1993	Subaru Vivio Sedan 4WD		(Kenya) Patrick Njiru	MON	SWE	POR	KEN; 12	FRA	GRC	ARG	NZL	FIN	AUS	ITA	ESP	GBR				-	0	3rd	112
1993	Subaru Vivio Sedan 4WD		(Japan) Masashi Ishida	MON	SWE	POR	KEN; Ret	FRA	GRC	ARG	NZL	FIN	AUS	ITA	ESP	GBR				-	0	3rd	112
1993	Subaru Legacy RS		(Finland) Ari Vatanen	MON	SWE	POR	KEN	FRA	GRC; Ret	ARG; Ret	NZL		AUS; 2	ITA	ESP	GBR; 5				7th	38	3rd	112
1993	Subaru Impreza 555		(Finland) Ari Vatanen									FIN; 2								7th	38	3rd	112
1993	Subaru Legacy RS		(Australia) Peter 'Possum' Bourne	MON	SWE	POR	KEN	FRA	GRC	ARG	NZL; 6	FIN	AUS; Ret	ITA	ESP	GBR				31st	6	3rd	112
1993	Subaru Legacy RS		(Italy) Piero Liatti	MON	SWE	POR	KEN	FRA	GRC	ARG	NZL	FIN	AUS	ITA; 4	ESP	GBR				24th	10	3rd	112
1993	Subaru Legacy RS		(England) Richard Burns	MON	SWE	POR	KEN	FRA	GRC	ARG	NZL	FIN	AUS	ITA	ESP	GBR; 7				28th	4	3rd	112
1993	Subaru Legacy RS		(Scotland) Alister McRae	MON	SWE	POR	KEN	FRA	GRC	ARG	NZL	FIN	AUS	ITA	ESP	GBR; 10				65th	1	3rd	112
1994	Subaru Impreza 555		(Spain) Carlos Sainz	MON; 3	POR; 4	KEN	FRA; 2	GRC; 1	ARG; 2	NZL; Ret	FIN; 3	ITA; 2	GBR; Ret							2nd	99	2nd	140
1994	Subaru Impreza 555		(Scotland) Colin McRae	MON; 10	POR; Ret	KEN	FRA; Ret	GRC; Ret	ARG; Ret	NZL; 1	FIN	ITA; 5	GBR; 1							4th	49	2nd	140
1994	Subaru Impreza 555		(Australia) Peter 'Possum' Bourne	MON	POR	KEN	FRA	GRC	ARG	NZL; Ret	FIN	ITA	GBR							-	0	2nd	140
1994	Subaru Impreza 555		(England) Richard Burns							NZL; Ret	FIN	ITA	GBR; Ret							19th	8	2nd	140
1994	Subaru Impreza WRX		(England) Richard Burns	MON	POR	KEN; 5	FRA	GRC	ARG											19th	8	2nd	140
1994	Subaru Impreza WRX		(Kenya) Patrick Njiru	MON	POR	KEN; 4	FRA	GRC	ARG	NZL	FIN	ITA	GBR							15th	10	2nd	140
1995	Subaru Impreza 555	4	(Scotland) Colin McRae	MON; Ret	SWE; Ret	POR; 3	FRA; 5	NZL; 1	AUS; 2	ESP; 2	GBR; 1									1st	90	1st	350
1995	Subaru Impreza 555	5	(Spain) Carlos Sainz	MON; 1	SWE; Ret	POR; 1	FRA; 4	NZL; DNS	AUS; Ret	ESP; 1	GBR; 2									2nd	85	1st	350
1995	Subaru Impreza 555	5	(Italy) Piero Liatti	MON; 8			FRA; 6			ESP; 3										8th	26	1st	350
1995	Subaru Impreza 555	5	(Sweden) Mats Jonsson		SWE; Ret															-	0	1st	350
1995	Subaru Impreza 555	5	(Australia) Peter 'Possum' Bourne					NZL; 7	AUS; Ret											14th	4	1st	350
1995	Subaru Impreza 555	5	(England) Richard Burns			POR; 7			AUS; Ret		GBR; 3									9th	16	1st	350
1995	Subaru Impreza 555	14	(England) Richard Burns	MON	SWE		FRA	NZL; Ret		ESP										9th	16	1st	350
1996	Subaru Impreza 555	1	(Scotland) Colin McRae	SWE; 3	KEN; 4	IDN; Ret	GRC; 1	ARG; Ret	FIN; Ret	AUS; 4	ITA; 1	ESP; 1								2nd	92	1st	401
1996	Subaru Impreza 555	2	(Sweden) Kenneth Eriksson	SWE; 5	KEN; 2	IDN; Ret	GRC; 5	ARG; 3	FIN; 5	AUS; 2	ITA; 5	ESP; 7								4th	78	1st	401
1996	Subaru Impreza 555	3	(France) Didier Auriol	SWE; 10																25th*	4*	1st	401
1996	Subaru Impreza 555	3	(Italy) Piero Liatti		KEN; 5	IDN; 2	GRC; 4	ARG; 7	FIN; DNS	AUS; 7	ITA; Ret	ESP; 2								5th	56	1st	401
1996	Subaru Impreza 555	10	(Italy) Piero Liatti	SWE; 12																5th	56	1st	401
1997	Subaru Impreza WRC 97	3	(Scotland) Colin McRae	MON; Ret	SWE; 4	KEN; 1	POR; Ret	ESP; 4	FRA; 1	ARG; 2	GRC; Ret	NZL; Ret	FIN; Ret	IDN; Ret	ITA; 1	AUS; 1	GBR; 1			2nd	62	1st	114
1997	Subaru Impreza WRC 97	4	(Sweden) Kenneth Eriksson	MON	SWE; 1	KEN; Ret	POR; Ret	ESP	FRA	ARG; 3	GRC; Ret	NZL; 1	FIN; Ret	IDN; 3	ITA	AUS; Ret	GBR; Ret			5th	28	1st	114
1997	Subaru Impreza WRC 97	4	(Italy) Piero Liatti	MON; 1				ESP; 2	FRA; 5						ITA; 2		GBR			6th	24	1st	114
1997	Subaru Impreza WRC 97	8	(Italy) Piero Liatti		SWE	KEN	POR			ARG	GRC	NZL	FIN	IDN		AUS	GBR; 7			6th	24	1st	114
1998	Subaru Impreza WRC 98	3	(Scotland) Colin McRae	MON; 3		KEN; Ret	POR; 1	ESP; Ret	FRA; 1	ARG; 5	GRC; 1	NZL; 5	FIN; Ret	ITA; 3	AUS; 4	GBR; Ret				3rd	45	3rd	65
1998	Subaru Impreza WRC 97	3	(Scotland) Colin McRae		SWE; Ret															3rd	45	3rd	65
1998	Subaru Impreza WRC 98	4	(Italy) Piero Liatti	MON; 4		KEN; Ret	POR; 6	ESP; Ret	FRA; 3	ARG; 6	GRC; 6	NZL; 6		ITA; 2	AUS; Ret					7th	17	3rd	65
1998	Subaru Impreza WRC 97	4	(Sweden) Kenneth Eriksson		SWE; 4															13th	3	3rd	65
1998	Subaru Impreza WRC 98	4	(Finland) Jarmo Kytölehto										FIN; 8							-	0	3rd	65
1998	Subaru Impreza WRC 98	4	(Scotland) Alister McRae													GBR; Ret				-	0	3rd	65
1998	Subaru Impreza WRC 98	10	(Italy) Piero Liatti		SWE; 9								FIN			GBR				17th	7	3rd	65
1998	Subaru Impreza WRC 98	12	(Finland) Ari Vatanen	MON	SWE	KEN	POR	ESP	FRA	ARG	GRC	NZL	FIN	ITA	AUS	GBR; Ret				11th*	6*	3rd	65
1998	Subaru Impreza WRC 98	15	(Finland) Jarmo Kytölehto	MON	SWE	KEN	POR	ESP	FRA	ARG	GRC	NZL; Ret	FIN	ITA	AUS	GBR				-	0	3rd	65
1999	Subaru Impreza WRC 99	5	(England) Richard Burns	MON; 8	SWE; 5		POR; 4	ESP; 5	FRA; 7	ARG; 2	GRE; 1	NZL; Ret	FIN; 2	CHN; 2	ITA; Ret	AUS; 1	GBR; 1			2nd	55	2nd	105
1999	Subaru Impreza WRC 98	5	(England) Richard Burns			KEN; Ret														2nd	55	2nd	105
1999	Subaru Impreza WRC 99	6	(Finland) Juha Kankkunen	MON; 2	SWE; 6		POR; Ret			ARG; 1	GRE; Ret	NZL; 2	FIN; 1	CHN; 4	ITA; 6	AUS; Ret	GBR; 2			4th	44	2nd	105
1999	Subaru Impreza WRC 98	6	(Finland) Juha Kankkunen			KEN; Ret														4th	44	2nd	105
1999	Subaru Impreza WRC 99	6	(Belgium) Bruno Thiry					ESP; 7	FRA; Ret											14th*	6*	2nd	105
1999	Subaru Impreza WRC 99	14	(Belgium) Bruno Thiry	MON; 5	SWE; 10		POR; 6			ARG	GRE	NZL	FIN	CHN	ITA	AUS	GBR			14th*	6*	2nd	105
1999	Subaru Impreza WRC 98	14	(Belgium) Bruno Thiry			KEN; Ret														14th*	6*	2nd	105
1999	Subaru Impreza WRC 99	14	(Finland) Juha Kankkunen					ESP; 6												4th	44	2nd	105
2000	Subaru Impreza WRC 99	3	(England) Richard Burns	MON; Ret	SWE; 5	KEN; 1														2nd	60	3rd	88
2000	Subaru Impreza WRC2000	3	(England) Richard Burns				POR; 1	ESP; 2	ARG; 1	GRE; Ret	NZL; Ret	FIN; Ret	CYP; 4	FRA; 4	ITA; Ret	AUS; 2	GBR; 1			2nd	60	3rd	88
2000	Subaru Impreza WRC 99	4	(Finland) Juha Kankkunen	MON; 3	SWE; 6	KEN; 2														8th	20	3rd	88
2000	Subaru Impreza WRC2000	4	(Finland) Juha Kankkunen				POR; Ret	ESP; Ret	ARG; 4	GRC; 3	NZL; Ret	FIN; 8	CYP; 7			AUS; Ret	GBR; 5			8th	20	3rd	88
2000	Subaru Impreza WRC2000	4	(France) Simon Jean-Joseph											FRA; 7	ITA; 7					-	0	3rd	88
2000	Subaru Impreza WRC2000	16	(Norway) Petter Solberg	MON	SWE	KEN	POR	ESP	ARG	GRE	NZL	FIN	CYP	FRA; Ret	ITA; 9	AUS; Ret	GBR; Ret			10th*	6*	3rd	88
2000	Subaru Impreza WRC2000	18	(Estonia) Markko Märtin	MON	SWE	KEN	POR	ESP	ARG	GRE	NZL	FIN	CYP	FRA	ITA	AUS; Ret	GBR			23rd*	1*	3rd	88
2001	Subaru Impreza WRC2001	5	(England) Richard Burns	MON; Ret	SWE; 16	POR; 4	ESP; 7	ARG; 2	CYP; 2	GRE; Ret	KEN; Ret	FIN; 2	NZL; 1	ITA; Ret	FRA; 4	AUS; 2	GBR; 3			1st	44	4th	66
2001	Subaru Impreza WRC2001	6	(Norway) Petter Solberg	MON; Ret	SWE; 6	POR; Ret	ESP; Ret	ARG; 5	CYP; Ret	GRE; 2	KEN; Ret	FIN; 7	NZL; 7	ITA; 9	FRA; 5	AUS; 7	GBR; Ret			10th	11	4th	66
2001	Subaru Impreza WRC2001	18	(Estonia) Markko Märtin	MON; Ret	SWE; 12	POR; Ret	ESP; Ret			GRC; Ret		FIN; 5		ITA; Ret	FRA; 6		GBR; Ret			19th	3	4th	66
2001	Subaru Impreza WRC2001	18	(Japan) Toshihiro Arai					ARG; 8	CYP; 4		KEN; Ret		NZL; 14			AUS; Ret				18th	3	4th	66
2001	Subaru Impreza WRC2001	21	(Japan) Toshihiro Arai	MON	SWE	POR; Ret	ESP			GRC; Ret		FIN		ITA; Ret	FRA; Ret		GBR; 10			18th	3	4th	66
2002	Subaru Impreza WRC2001	10	(Finland) Tommi Mäkinen	MON; 1	SWE; Ret															8th	22	3rd	67
2002	Subaru Impreza WRC2002	10	(Finland) Tommi Mäkinen			FRA; Ret	ESP; Ret	CYP; 3	ARG; Ret	GRE; Ret	KEN; Ret	FIN; 6	GER; 7	ITA; Ret	NZL; 3	AUS; DSQ	GBR; 4			8th	22	3rd	67
2002	Subaru Impreza WRC2001	11	(Norway) Petter Solberg	MON; 6	SWE; Ret															2nd	37	3rd	67
2002	Subaru Impreza WRC2002	11	(Norway) Petter Solberg			FRA; 5	ESP; 5	CYP; 5	ARG; 2	GRE; 5	KEN; Ret	FIN; 3	GER; Ret	ITA; 3	NZL; Ret	AUS; 3	GBR; 1			2nd	37	3rd	67
2002	Subaru Impreza WRC2002	12	(Austria) Achim Mörtl										GER; Ret	ITA; Ret	NZL	AUS	GBR			-	0	3rd	67
2002	Subaru Impreza WRC2002	12	(Japan) Toshihiro Arai	MON	SWE	FRA	ESP	CYP	ARG	GRE; 13	KEN	FIN								-	0	3rd	67
2002	Subaru Impreza WRC2002	26	(Japan) Toshihiro Arai										GER; Ret	ITA	NZL	AUS	GBR			-	0	3rd	67
2003	Subaru Impreza WRC 03	7	(Norway) Petter Solberg	MON; Ret	SWE; 6	TUR; Ret	NZL; 3	ARG; 5	GRE; 3	CYP; 1	GER; 8	FIN; 2	AUS; 1	ITA; Ret	FRA; 1	ESP; 5	GBR; 1			1st	72	3rd	109
2003	Subaru Impreza WRC 03	8	(Finland) Tommi Mäkinen	MON; Ret	SWE; 2	TUR; 8	NZL; 7	ARG; Ret	GRE; 5	CYP; Ret	GER; Ret	FIN; 6	AUS; 6	ITA; 10	FRA; 7	ESP; 8	GBR; 3			8th	30	3rd	109
2004	Subaru Impreza WRC 03	1	(Norway) Petter Solberg	MON; 7	SWE; 3															2nd	82	3rd	122
2004	Subaru Impreza WRC 04	1	(Norway) Petter Solberg			MEX; 4	NZL; 1	CYP; 4	GRE; 1	TUR; 3	ARG; Ret	FIN; Ret	GER; Ret	JPN; 1	GBR; 1	ITA; 1	FRA; 5	ESP; 5	AUS; Ret	2nd	82	3rd	122
2004	Subaru Impreza WRC 03	2	(Finland) Mikko Hirvonen	MON; Ret	SWE; 9															7th	29	3rd	122
2004	Subaru Impreza WRC 04	2	(Finland) Mikko Hirvonen			MEX; 5	NZL; 7	CYP; 5	GRC; Ret	TUR; 6	ARG; 4	FIN; Ret	GER; 8	JPN; 7	GBR; 7	ITA; Ret	FRA; 10	ESP; 8	AUS; 4	7th	29	3rd	122
2005	Subaru Impreza WRC 04	5	(Norway) Petter Solberg	MON; Ret	SWE; 1															2nd	71	4th	97
2005	Subaru Impreza WRC 05	5	(Norway) Petter Solberg			MEX; 1	NZL; 3	ITA; 2	CYP; Ret	TUR; 2	GRE; 9	ARG; 3	FIN; 4	GER; 7	GBR; 1	JPN; Ret	FRA; 3	ESP; 13	AUS; Ret	2nd	71	4th	97
2005	Subaru Impreza WRC 04	6	(France) Stéphane Sarrazin	MON; 14	SWE; 13															17th	6	4th	97
2005	Subaru Impreza WRC 05	6	(France) Stéphane Sarrazin											GER; 8			FRA; 4	ESP; Ret		17th	6	4th	97
2005	Subaru Impreza WRC 05	6	(Australia) Chris Atkinson			MEX; Ret	NZL; 7	ITA; 18	CYP; 10	TUR; 24	GRE; Ret	ARG; 9	FIN; Ret		GBR; 38	JPN; 3			AUS; 4	12th	13	4th	97
2005	Subaru Impreza WRC 04	16	(Australia) Chris Atkinson	MON	SWE; 19															12th	13	4th	97
2005	Subaru Impreza WRC 05	16	(Australia) Chris Atkinson											GER; 11			FRA; 4	ESP; 9		12th	13	4th	97
2005	Subaru Impreza WRC 05	16	(France) Stéphane Sarrazin			MEX	NZL	ITA; 12	CYP	TUR	GRE; 13	ARG	FIN		GBR; Ret	JPN			AUS	17th	6	4th	97
2006	Subaru Impreza WRC 06	5	(Norway) Petter Solberg	MON; Ret	SWE; Ret	MEX; 2	ESP; 7	FRA; 11	ARG; 2	ITA; 9	GRE; 7	GER; Ret	FIN; Ret	JPN; 7	CYP; 8	TUR; 13	AUS; 2	NZL; 6	GBR; 3	6th	40	3rd	106
2006	Subaru Impreza WRC 06	6	(France) Stéphane Sarrazin	MON; 5			ESP; 8	FRA; 8				GER; Ret								18th	6	3rd	106
2006	Subaru Impreza WRC 06	6	(Australia) Chris Atkinson		SWE; 11	MEX; 7			ARG; 6	ITA; 10	GRE; 11		FIN; 13	JPN; 4	CYP; 9	TUR; 6	AUS; 9	NZL; Ret	GBR; 6	10th*	20*	3rd	106
2006	Subaru Impreza WRC 06	14	(Japan) Toshihiro Arai	MON	SWE	MEX	ESP	FRA	ARG	ITA	GRE	GER	FIN	JPN; 6	CYP	TUR	AUS	NZL	GBR	25th	3	3rd	106
2007	Subaru Impreza WRC 06	5	(Norway) Petter Solberg	MON; 6	SWE; Ret	NOR; 4														5th	47	3rd	87
2007	Subaru Impreza WRC 07	5	(Norway) Petter Solberg				MEX; Ret	POR; 2	ARG; Ret	ITA; 5	GRE; 3	FIN; Ret	GER; 6	NZL; 7	ESP; 6	FRA; 5	JPN; 16	IRE; 5	GBR; 4	5th	47	3rd	87
2007	Subaru Impreza WRC 06	6	(Australia) Chris Atkinson	MON; 4	SWE; 8	NOR; 19														7th	31	3rd	87
2007	Subaru Impreza WRC 07	6	(Australia) Chris Atkinson				MEX; 5	POR; Ret	ARG; 7	ITA; 10	GRE; 6	FIN; 4	GER; 15	NZL; 4	ESP; 8	FRA; 6	JPN; Ret	IRE; 42	GBR; 7	7th	31	3rd	87
2007	Subaru Impreza WRC 07	17	(Spain) Xavier Pons	MON	SWE	NOR	MEX	POR	ARG	ITA	GRE	FIN; 6	GER; 18	NZL; Ret	ESP; 9	FRA; 8	JPN; 35	IRE; Ret	GBR; 9	17th	4	3rd	87
2008	Subaru Impreza WRC 07	5	(Norway) Petter Solberg	MON; 5	SWE; 4	MEX; 11	ARG; Ret	JOR; Ret	ITA; 10											6th	46	3rd	98
2008	Subaru Impreza WRC 08	5	(Norway) Petter Solberg							GRE; 2	TUR; 6	FIN; 6	GER; 5	NZL; 4	ESP; 5	FRA; 5	JPN; 8	GBR; 4		6th	46	3rd	98
2008	Subaru Impreza WRC 07	6	(Australia) Chris Atkinson	MON; 3	SWE; 21	MEX; 2	ARG; 2	JOR; 3	ITA; 6											5th	50	3rd	98
2008	Subaru Impreza WRC 08	6	(Australia) Chris Atkinson							GRE; Ret	TUR; 13	FIN; 3	GER; 6	NZL; Ret	ESP; 7	FRA; 6	JPN; 4	GBR; Ret		5th	50	3rd	98
2008	Subaru Impreza WRC 08	14	(France) Brice Tirabassi	MON	SWE	MEX	ARG	JOR	ITA	GRE	TUR	FIN	GER	NZL	ESP; 10	FRA; Ret	JPN	GBR		-	0	3rd	98
