= Sebastian Lindholm =

Finnish rally driver (born 1961)

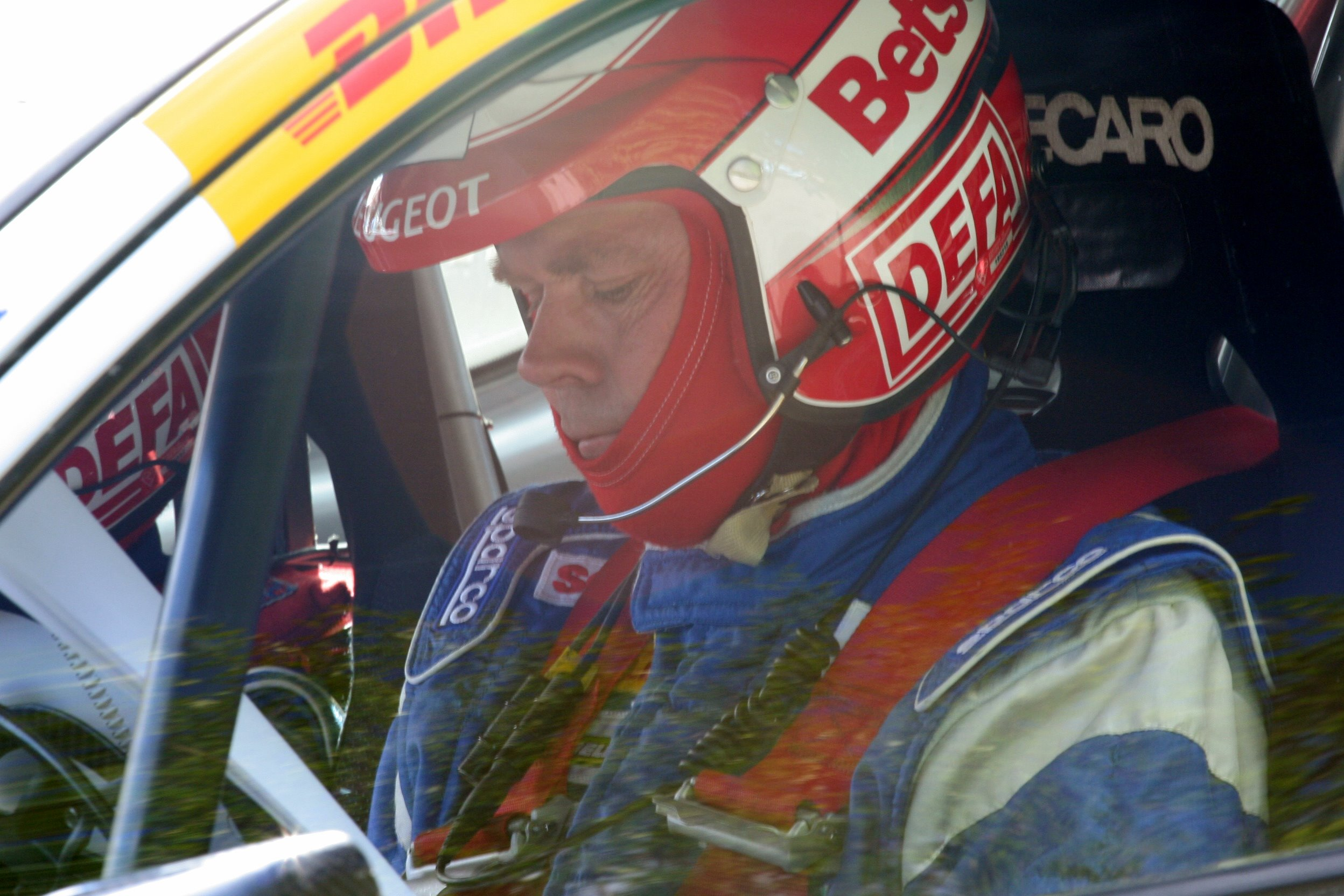
- Lindholm at the Uusikaupunki-rally in 2006.

Personal information
- Nationality: (Finland) Finnish
- Full name: Sebastian Hans Kurt Lindholm
- Born: 30 January 1961 (age 65); Helsinki, Finland

World Rally Championship record
- Years active: 1984 – 2012
- Co-driver: (Finland) Göran Nyberg (Finland) Staffan Petterson (Finland) Juha Saarinen (United Kingdom) Steve Bond (Finland) Pentti Kuukkala (Finland) Seppo Harjanne (Finland) Timo Hantunen (Finland) Cedric Wrede (Finland) Timo Hakala (Finland) Ilkka Riipinen (Finland) Jukka Aho (Finland) Tomi Tuominen
- Teams: Ford, Peugeot, Suzuki
- Rallies: 39
- Championships: 0
- Rally wins: 0
- Podiums: 0
- Stage wins: 6
- Total points: 40
- First rally: 1984 1000 Lakes Rally
- Last rally: 2012 Rally Finland

Sebastian Hans Kurt "Basti" Lindholm (born 30 January 1961 in Helsinki) is a rally driver from Finland. He is a cousin of Marcus Grönholm and a father of Emil Lindholm. Lindholm has won the Finnish Rally Championship eight times; 1990, 1993, 1995, 2000, 2002, 2003, 2004 and 2006.

Lindholm has also competed in 37 World Rally Championship events. His best result is fourth at the 1997 Rally Finland, driving a Ford Escort WRC. In 2007, Lindholm drove Suzuki's SX 4 WRC in its gravel debut at the 2007 Rally GB.

On 19 July 2009, Lindholm was involved in a fatal accident in Estonia at Lõuna-Eesti Rally when he crashed on the fourth stage. With the speed around 160 km/h (99 mph), Lindholm hit a spectator who died instantly.

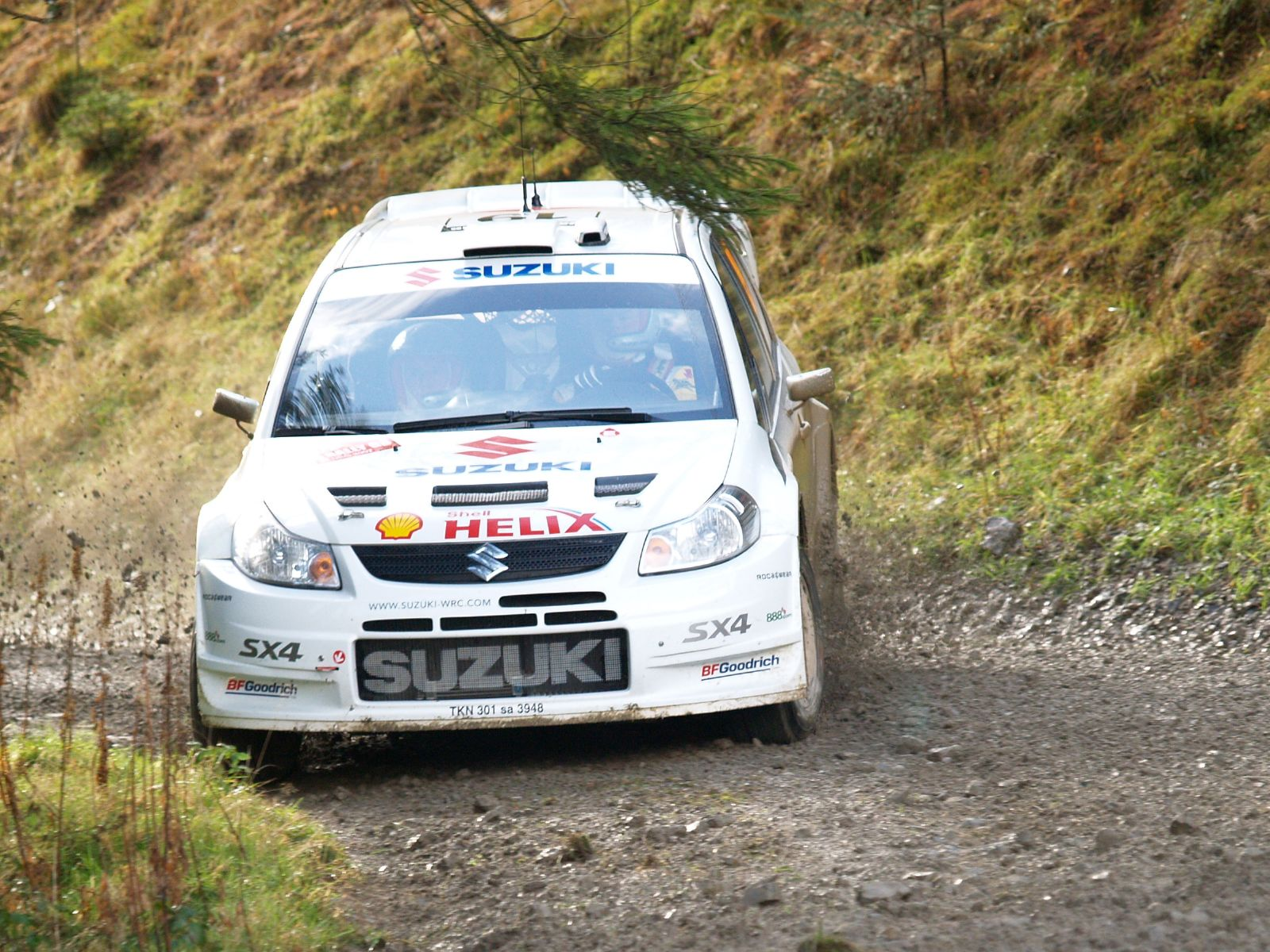
Lindholm driving his Suzuki SX4 WRC at the 2007 Rally GB.

== Complete WRC results ==
Year	Entrant	Car	1	2	3	4	5	6	7	8	9	10	11	12	13	14	15	16	WDC	Points
1984	Sebastian Lindholm	Opel Ascona i2000	MON	SWE	POR	KEN	FRA	GRC	NZL	ARG	FIN; Ret	ITA	CIV	GBR					NC	0
1985	Sebastian Lindholm	Audi 80 Quattro	MON	SWE	POR	KEN	FRA	GRE	NZL	ARG	FIN; 10	ITA	CIV	GBR					76th	1
1986	Sebastian Lindholm	Audi 80 Quattro	MON	SWE; Ret	POR	KEN	FRA	GRC	NZL	ARG	FIN; 13	CIV	ITA	GBR	USA				NC	0
1987	VW-Auto Oy	Audi Coupé Quattro	MON	SWE	POR	KEN	FRA	GRC	USA	NZL	ARG	FIN; 7	CIV	ITA	GBR				46th	4
1988	Sebastian Lindholm	Audi Coupé Quattro	MON	SWE; 9											GBR; Ret				73rd	2
1988	David Sutton Motorsport	Audi Coupé Quattro			POR; Ret	KEN	FRA	GRE; Ret	USA	NZL	ARG								73rd	2
1988	Autodrive	Lancia Delta Integrale										FIN; Ret	CIV	ITA					73rd	2
1989	Autonovo	Lancia Delta Integrale	SWE; 6	MON	POR	KEN	FRA	GRE	NZL	ARG									42nd	6
1989	Sebastian Lindholm	Lancia Delta Integrale									FIN; Ret	AUS	ITA	CIV	GBR; Ret				42nd	6
1990	Team Michelin Finland	Lancia Delta Integrale 16V	MON	POR	KEN	FRA	GRE	NZL	ARG	FIN; 8	AUS	ITA	CIV	GBR					47th	3
1991	Ford Finland	Ford Sierra RS Cosworth 4x4	MON	SWE	POR	KEN	FRA	GRE	NZL	ARG	FIN; Ret	AUS	ITA	CIV	ESP	GBR			NC	0
1992	Sebastian Lindholm	Ford Sierra RS Cosworth 4x4	MON	SWE; Ret	POR	KEN	FRA	GRE	NZL	ARG	FIN; 7	AUS	ITA	CIV	ESP	GBR			41st	4
1993	Ford Motor Co. Ltd.	Ford Escort RS Cosworth	MON	SWE; Ret	POR	KEN	FRA	GRE	ARG	NZL									31st	6
1993	Ford Team Finland	Ford Escort RS Cosworth									FIN; 6	AUS	ITA	ESP					31st	6
1993	Sebastian Lindholm	Ford Escort RS Cosworth													GBR; Ret				31st	6
1994	Ford Team Finland	Ford Escort RS Cosworth	MON	POR	KEN	FRA	GRE	ARG	NZL	FIN; Ret	ITA	GBR							NC	0
1995	Sebastian Lindholm	Ford Escort RS2000	MON	SWE	POR	FRA	NZL	AUS	ESP	GBR; Ret									NC	0
1996	Ford Team Finland	Ford Escort RS Cosworth	SWE; Ret	KEN	IDN	GRE	ARG	FIN; 7	AUS	ITA	ESP								23rd	4
1997	Ford Team Finland	Ford Escort WRC	MON	SWE	KEN	POR	ESP	FRA	ARG	GRE	NZL	FIN; 4	IDN	ITA	AUS	GBR			19th	3
1998	Ford Team Finland	Ford Escort WRC	MON	SWE	KEN	POR	ESP	FRA	ARG	GRE	NZL	FIN; Ret	ITA						17th	2
1998	Gazprom Rally Team	Ford Escort WRC												AUS; 9	GBR; 5				17th	2
1999	Gazprom Rally Team	Ford Escort WRC	MON	SWE; Ret	KEN	POR	ESP	FRA	ARG	GRE	NZL								NC	0
1999	Ford Team Finland	Ford Escort WRC										FIN; 7	CHN	ITA	AUS	GBR			NC	0
2000	Peugeot Esso	Peugeot 206 WRC	MON	SWE	KEN	POR	ESP	ARG	GRE	NZL	FIN; 5	CYP	FRA	ITA	AUS	GBR			19th	2
2001	Sebastian Lindholm	Peugeot 206 WRC	MON	SWE	POR	ESP	ARG	CYP	GRC	KEN	FIN; 8	NZL	ITA	FRA	AUS	GBR			NC	0
2002	Sebastian Lindholm	Peugeot 206 WRC	MON	SWE; 9	FRA	ESP	CYP	ARG	GRE	KEN									14th	2
2002	Peugeot Sport Finland	Peugeot 206 WRC									FIN; 7	GER	ITA	NZL	AUS	GBR			14th	2
2003	Peugeot Sport Finland	Peugeot 206 WRC	MON	SWE	TUR	NZL	ARG	GRE	CYP	GER	FIN; 8	AUS	ITA	FRA	ESP	GBR			24th	1
2004	Marlboro Peugeot Total	Peugeot 307 WRC	MON	SWE	MEX	NZL	CYP	GRE	TUR	ARG	FIN; Ret	GER	JPN	GBR	ITA	FRA	ESP	AUS	NC	0
2005	Sebastian Lindholm	Peugeot 307 WRC	MON	SWE	MEX	NZL	ITA	CYP	TUR	GRE	ARG	FIN; Ret	GER	GBR	JPN	FRA	ESP	AUS	NC	0
2007	Suzuki World Rally Team	Suzuki SX4 WRC	MON	SWE	NOR	MEX	POR	ARG	ITA	GRE	FIN	GER	NZL	ESP	FRA	JPN	IRE	GBR; 27	NC	0
2012	Sebastian Lindholm	Ford Fiesta RS WRC	MON	SWE	MEX	POR	ARG	GRE	NZL	FIN; 14	GER	GBR	FRA	ITA	ESP				NC	0
