= Sepo =

Sepo may refer to:

- Sepo County, a county in North Korea
  - Sepo Chongnyon Station
- Sepo, Illinois, a town in the United States
- Sepo ceramics, Mississippian culture
- SEPO (State Enterprise Policy Office), Ministry of Finance Thailand

== See also ==
- Seppo
