= 1996 World Rally Championship =

24th season of the FIA World Rally Championship

1996 FIA World Rally Championship

Champions
- World Drivers' Champion: Tommi Mäkinen
- World Manufacturers' Champion: Subaru

Seasons
- ← 1995 1997 →

The 1996 World Rally Championship was the 24th season of the FIA World Rally Championship. The season consisted of 9 rallies. As a result of their 1995 disqualification, Toyota Team Europe were not allowed to compete in this year's championship, so only three works teams contested the championship. The drivers' world championship was won by Tommi Mäkinen in a Mitsubishi Lancer Evo 3, ahead of Colin McRae and Carlos Sainz. The manufacturers' title was won by Subaru.

== Calendar ==
The 1996 championship was contested over nine rounds in Europe, Africa, Asia, South America and Oceania.

Rd.	Start date	Finish date	Rally	Rally headquarters	Surface	Stages	Distance
1	9 February	11 February	(Sweden) 45th International Swedish Rally	Karlstad, Värmland County	Snow	27	490.64 km
2	5 April	7 April	44th Safari Rally Kenya	Nairobi	Gravel	15	1784.40 km
3	10 May	12 May	21st Bank Utama Rally Indonesia	Medan, North Sumatra	Gravel	27	452.29 km
4	2 June	4 June	(Greece) 43rd Acropolis Rally	Athens	Gravel	21	454.34 km
5	4 July	6 July	16th Rally Argentina	Carlos Paz, Córdoba	Gravel	28	516.15 km
6	23 August	26 August	(Finland) 46th Neste 1000 Lakes Rally	Jyväskylä, Central Finland	Gravel	29	478.93 km
7	13 September	16 September	9th Rally Australia	Perth, Western Australia	Gravel	27	475.92 km
8	13 October	16 October	(Italy) 38th Rallye Sanremo - Rallye d'Italia	Sanremo, Liguria	Mixed	18	413.32 km
9	23 November	25 November	(Spain) 32nd Rallye Catalunya - Costa Brava - Rallye de España	Lloret de Mar, Catalonia	Tarmac	18	393.26 km

== Teams and drivers ==
=== Manufacturer entries ===
Team	Manufacturer	Car	Tyre	No.	Driver	Co-Driver	Rounds
(Japan) 555 Subaru WRT	Subaru	Impreza 555	P	1	(United Kingdom) Colin McRae	(United Kingdom) Derek Ringer	All
(Japan) 555 Subaru WRT	Subaru	Impreza 555	P	2	(Sweden) Kenneth Eriksson	(Sweden) Staffan Parmander	All
(Japan) 555 Subaru WRT	Subaru	Impreza 555	P	3	(France) Didier Auriol	(France) Bernard Occelli	1
(Japan) 555 Subaru WRT	Subaru	Impreza 555	P	3	(Italy) Piero Liatti	(Italy) Mario Ferfoglia	2
(Japan) 555 Subaru WRT	Subaru	Impreza 555	P	3	(Italy) Piero Liatti	(Italy) Fabrizia Pons	3–5, 7–9
(Japan) 555 Subaru WRT	Subaru	Impreza 555	P	10	(Italy) Piero Liatti	(Italy) Mario Ferfoglia	1
(United States) Ford Motor Co. Ltd.	Ford	Escort RS Cosworth	M	4	(Spain) Carlos Sainz	(Spain) Luis Moya	All
(United States) Ford Motor Co. Ltd.	Ford	Escort RS Cosworth	M	5	(France) François Delecour	(France) Daniel Grataloup	1
(United States) Ford Motor Co. Ltd.	Ford	Escort RS Cosworth	M	5	(Sweden) Stig Blomqvist	(Sweden) Benny Melander	2
(United States) Ford Motor Co. Ltd.	Ford	Escort RS Cosworth	M	5	(United Kingdom) Gwyndaf Evans	(United Kingdom) Howard Davies	3
(United States) Ford Motor Co. Ltd.	Ford	Escort RS Cosworth	M	5	(Belgium) Bruno Thiry	(Belgium) Stéphane Prévot	4–9
(United States) Ford Motor Co. Ltd.	Ford	Escort RS Cosworth	M	6	(Sweden) Stig Blomqvist	(Sweden) Benny Melander	1
(United States) Ford Motor Co. Ltd.	Ford	Escort RS Cosworth	M	6	(Indonesia) Dandy Rukmana	(Indonesia) Supi Sabastian	3
(United States) Ford Motor Co. Ltd.	Ford	Escort RS Cosworth	M	14	(Finland) Ari Vatanen	(Italy) Fabrizia Pons	1
(United States) Ford Motor Co. Ltd.	Ford	Escort RS Cosworth	M	16	(Finland) Ari Mökkönen	(Finland) Voitto Silander	4
(Japan) Mitsubishi Ralliart	Mitsubishi	Lancer Evo III	M	7	(Finland) Tommi Mäkinen	(Finland) Seppo Harjanne	1–8
(Japan) Mitsubishi Ralliart	Mitsubishi	Lancer Evo III	M	7	(Finland) Tommi Mäkinen	(Finland) Juha Repo	9
(Japan) Mitsubishi Ralliart	Mitsubishi	Lancer Evo III (Grp. N)	M	8	(Sweden) Kenneth Bäcklund	(Sweden) Tord Andersson	1
(Japan) Mitsubishi Ralliart	Mitsubishi	Lancer Evo III	M	8	(Japan) Kenjiro Shinozuka	(Finland) Pentti Kuukkala	2
(Japan) Mitsubishi Ralliart	Mitsubishi	Lancer Evo III	M	8	(United Kingdom) Richard Burns	(United Kingdom) Robert Reid	3, 5, 7, 9
(Japan) Mitsubishi Ralliart	Mitsubishi	Lancer Evo III (Grp. N)	P	8	(Germany) Uwe Nittel	(Sweden) Tina Thörner	4
(Japan) Mitsubishi Ralliart	Mitsubishi	Lancer Evo III	M	8	(Finland) Lasse Lampi	(Finland) Jyrki Stenroos	6
(Japan) Mitsubishi Ralliart	Mitsubishi	Lancer Evo III	M	8	(France) Didier Auriol	(France) Denis Giraudet	8
(Japan) Mitsubishi Ralliart	Mitsubishi	Lancer Evo III (Grp. N)	P	9	(Germany) Uwe Nittel	(Sweden) Tina Thörner	1, 5, 8
(Japan) Mitsubishi Ralliart	Mitsubishi	Lancer Evo III	?	9	(Japan) Yoshihiro Kataoka	(Japan) Satoshi Hayashi	3
(Japan) Mitsubishi Ralliart	Mitsubishi	Lancer Evo III (Grp. N)	M	9	(Finland) Jouko Puhakka	(Finland) Keijo Eerola	6
(Japan) Mitsubishi Ralliart	Mitsubishi	Lancer Evo III (Grp. N)	?	9	(Australia) Ed Ordynski	(Australia) Mark Stacey	7
(Japan) Mitsubishi Ralliart	Mitsubishi	Lancer Evo III (Grp. N)	?	29	(Japan) Yoshihiro Kataoka	(Japan) Satoshi Hayashi	7
(Japan) Mitsubishi Ralliart	Mitsubishi	Lancer Evo III (Grp. N)	P	*	(Germany) Uwe Nittel	(Sweden) Christina Thörner	6–7, 9

=== Non Manufacturer Entries ===
Major entries not registered as manufacturers
Team	Manufacturer	Car	Tyre	Drivers	Co-drivers	Rounds
Toyota Castrol Team Sweden	Toyota	Celica GT-Four (ST205)	M	(Sweden) Thomas Rådström	(Sweden) Lars Bäckman	1
Toyota Castrol Team Sweden	Toyota	Celica GT-Four (ST205)	M	(Sweden) Thomas Rådström	(France) Denis Giraudet	9
Toyota Castrol Team Sweden	Toyota	Celica GT-Four (ST205)	M	(Finland) Juha Kankkunen	(United Kingdom) Nicky Grist	1
Toyota Castrol Team Sweden	Toyota	Celica GT-Four (ST205)	M	(Sweden) 'Gullabo'	(Sweden) Ingemar Algerstedt	1
Toyota Castrol Finland	Toyota	Celica GT-Four (ST205)	M	(Finland) Marcus Grönholm	(Finland) Timo Rautiainen	1, 6
Toyota Castrol Finland	Toyota	Celica GT-Four (ST205)	M	(Sweden) Thomas Rådström	(Sweden) Lars Bäckman	6
Toyota Castrol Finland	Toyota	Celica GT-Four (ST205)	M	(Finland) Juha Kankkunen	(United Kingdom) Nicky Grist	6
Toyota Kenya	Toyota	Celica GT-Four (ST205)	M	(Kenya) Ian Duncan	(Kenya) David Williamson	2
Toyota Team Australia	Toyota	Celica GT-Four (ST205)	M	(Finland) Juha Kankkunen	(United Kingdom) Nicky Grist	3
Toyota Team Australia	Toyota	Celica GT-Four (ST205)	?	(Australia) Neal Bates	(Australia) Coral Taylor	7
(Indonesia) Reza Pribadi	Toyota	Celica GT-Four (ST205)	?	(Indonesia) Reza Pribadi	(France) Denis Giraudet	3
(Italy) H.F. Grifone SRL	Toyota	Celica GT-Four (ST205)	M	(Portugal) Rui Madeira	(Portugal) Nuno Rodrigues da Silva	4–5, 8–9
(Italy) H.F. Grifone SRL	Toyota	Celica GT-Four (ST205)	M	(Sweden) Thomas Rådström	(France) Denis Giraudet	4
(Italy) H.F. Grifone SRL	Toyota	Celica GT-Four (ST205)	M	(Italy) Gilberto Pianezzola	(Italy) Loris Roggia	4–5, 8
(Italy) H.F. Grifone SRL	Toyota	Celica GT-Four (ST205)	M	(Italy) Andrea Dallavilla	(Italy) Danilo Fappani	6, 8
(Italy) H.F. Grifone SRL	Toyota	Celica GT-Four (ST205)	M	(Hungary) János jun. Tóth	(Hungary) Danilo Fappani	8
(Italy) H.F. Grifone SRL	Toyota	Celica GT-Four (ST205)	M	(Italy) Matteo Luise	(Italy) Raffaele Caliro	8
Toyota Team Belgium	Toyota	Celica GT-Four (ST205)	M	(Belgium) Freddy Loix	(Belgium) Sven Smeets	4, 8–9
(Japan) Toyotoshi	Toyota	Celica Turbo 4WD (ST185)	M	(Paraguay) Marco Galanti Jr.	(Argentina) Victor Zucchini	1, 5
(Japan) Toyotoshi	Toyota	Celica Turbo 4WD (ST185)	M	(Paraguay) Marco Galanti Jr.	(Argentina) Martin Christie	2
(Poland) Mobil 1 Stomil Olsztyn	Toyota	Celica Turbo 4WD (ST185)	M	(Poland) Krzysztof Hołowczyc	(Poland) Maciej Wisławski	1
(Kenya) Jonathan Toroitich	Toyota	Celica Turbo 4WD (ST185)	P	(Kenya) Jonathan Toroitich	(Kenya) Ibrahim Choge	2
(Japan) Tein Sport	Toyota	Celica Turbo 4WD (ST185)	M	(Japan) Yoshio Fujimoto	(Sweden) Arne Hertz	3, 7
(Monaco) Jean-Pierre Richelmi	Toyota	Celica Turbo 4WD (ST185)	M	(Monaco) Jean-Pierre Richelmi	(France) Thierry Barjou	4
Ford Team Finland	Ford	Escort RS Cosworth	M	(Finland) Sebastian Lindholm	(Finland) Timo Hantunen	1, 6
Shell Motorsport Norway	Ford	Escort RS Cosworth	?	(Norway) Birger Gundersen	(Norway) Cato Menkerud	1
(United Kingdom) Mobil Ford Motorsport	Ford	Escort RS Cosworth	M	(Sweden) Per Svan	(Sweden) Johan Olsson	1
Ford Motorsport Indonesia	Ford	Escort RS Cosworth	?	(Indonesia) Dolly Indra Nasution	(Indonesia) Farid Sungkar	3
Ford Motorsport Indonesia	Ford	Escort RS Cosworth	?	(Indonesia) Danny Rukmana	(Indonesia) Raphael Arioseno	3
(Indonesia) Bank Utama Rally Team	Ford	Escort RS Cosworth	?	(Indonesia) Pratikto Singgih	(Indonesia) Hervian Soejono	3
(Indonesia) Bank Utama Rally Team	Ford	Escort RS Cosworth	?	(Indonesia) Pratikto Singgih	(United Kingdom) Bobby Willis	7
(France) Yacco R.A.S. Ford	Ford	Escort RS Cosworth	M	(France) Patrick Bernardini	(France) Bernard Occelli	4
(France) Yacco R.A.S. Ford	Ford	Escort RS Cosworth	M	(France) Patrick Bernardini	(France) Catherine François	5
(France) Yacco R.A.S. Ford	Ford	Escort RS Cosworth	M	(France) Patrick Bernardini	(France) Dominique Savignoni	8–9
(United Kingdom) Stephen Finlay	Ford	Escort RS Cosworth	M	(United Kingdom) Stephen Finlay	(United Kingdom) Robbie Philpott	4
(Greece) Leonídas Kirkos	Ford	Escort RS Cosworth	M	(Greece) Leonídas Kirkos	(Greece) Ioánnis Stavropoulos	4
(Finland) Blue Rose Team	Ford	Escort RS Cosworth	M	(Finland) Jarmo Kytölehto	(Finland) Arto Kapanen	6, 8–9
Promoracing Finland	Ford	Escort RS Cosworth	M	(Finland) Harri Rovanperä	(Finland) Juha Repo	6
(South Africa) Jan Habig	Ford	Escort RS Cosworth	?	(South Africa) Jan Habig	(South Africa) Douglas Judd	7
(Italy) Jolly Club	Ford	Escort RS Cosworth	P	(Italy) Gianfranco Cunico	(Italy) Pierangelo Scalvini	8
(Spain) Ford España	Ford	Escort RS 2000 MKVI	M	(Spain) Daniel Alonso Villarón	(Spain) Salvador Belzunces	9
(Sweden) Clarion Team Europe	Subaru	Legacy RS	P	(Sweden) Per Eklund	(Sweden) Anders Olsson	1
(Indonesia) Goro Rally Team	Subaru	Impreza 555	?	(Indonesia) Ricardo Gelael	(Indonesia) Adiguna Sutowo	3
(Indonesia) Impreza Motorsport	Subaru	Impreza 555	?	(Indonesia) Tony Hardianto	(Indonesia) Anthony Sarwono	3
(Indonesia) Gading Rally Team	Subaru	Impreza 555	?	(Indonesia) Irvan Gading	(Indonesia) Karel Harilatu	3
(Japan) Impreza Recaro Fujitsubo	Subaru	Impreza 555	?	(Japan) Masao Kamioka	(United Kingdom) Kevin Gormley	4, 6
(Italy) A.R.T Engineering	Subaru	Impreza 555	P	(Italy) Angelo Medeghini	(Italy) Barbara Medeghini	4–6, 8–9
(Italy) A.R.T Engineering	Subaru	Impreza 555	P	(Italy) Andrea Navarra	(Italy) Renzo Casazza	6, 8
(France) F.Dor Rally Team	Subaru	Impreza 555	P	(France) Frédéric Dor	(France) Didier Breton	4, 6
(France) F.Dor Rally Team	Subaru	Impreza 555	P	(France) Frédéric Dor	(United Kingdom) Kevin Gormley	8
(Austria) Manfred Stohl	Subaru	Impreza 555	P	(Austria) Manfred Stohl	(Austria) Peter Müller	5
(New Zealand) Growth International Motorsport	Subaru	Impreza 555	?	(New Zealand) Peter 'Possum' Bourne	(New Zealand) Craig Vincent	7
(Lebanon) "Zeeohg"	Subaru	Impreza 555	?	(Lebanon) "Zeeohg"	(Lebanon) Raffy Etyemezian	9
(Sweden) Joakim Andersson	Volkswagen	Golf III GTi 16V	?	(Sweden) Joakim Andersson	(Sweden) Micael Eriksson	1
Volkswagen Motorsport Sweden	Volkswagen	Golf III GTi 16V	?	(Sweden) Jörgen Jonasson	(Sweden) Nicklas Jonasson	1
Volkswagen Motorsport Sweden	Volkswagen	Golf III GTi 16V	?	(Sweden) Harry Joki	(Sweden) Per Carlsson	1
(Finland) Blue Rose Team	Volkswagen	Golf III GTi 16V	?	(Finland) Tapio Laukkanen	(Finland) Risto Mannisenmäki	6
(Slovenia) Darko Peljhan	Volkswagen	Golf III GTi 16V	?	(Slovenia) Darko Peljhan	(Slovenia) Miran Kacin	8
Opel Team Sweden	Opel	Astra GSi 16V	?	(Sweden) Mats Jonsson	(Sweden) Johnny Johansson	1
(Austria) Remus Racing	Opel	Astra GSi 16V	?	(Austria) Kris Rosenberger	(Germany) Peter Diekmann	5, 8–9
(Austria) Stohl Racing	Audi	Coupé S2	M	(Austria) Rudolf Stohl	(Germany) Jürgen Bertl	2
(Austria) Stohl Racing	Audi	Coupé S2	M	(Austria) Rudolf Stohl	(Germany) Kay Gerlach	4
(Austria) Stohl Racing	Audi	Coupé S2	M	(Austria) Manfred Stohl	(Germany) Kay Gerlach	2
(Austria) Stohl Racing	Audi	Coupé S2	M	(Austria) Manfred Stohl	(Austria) Peter Müller	9
(Japan) Silverstone Suzuki Sport	Suzuki	Swift GTi MK2	S	(Japan) Nobuhiro Tajima	(Thailand) Visut Sukosi	3
(Japan) Silverstone Suzuki Sport	Suzuki	Baleno	S	(Japan) Nobuhiro Tajima	(Australia) Ross Runnalls	7
(Australia) Hyundai Rally Sport	Hyundai	Lantra	?	(Australia) Wayne Bell	(Australia) Iain Stewart	3, 7
(Australia) Hyundai Rally Sport	Hyundai	Coupé	?	(Australia) Greg Carr	(Australia) Glenn Macneall	3, 7
(Australia) Hyundai Rally Sport	Hyundai	Coupé	?	(South Korea) Kim Dong-Ok	(United Kingdom) Andrew Graham Walker	3
(Australia) Hyundai Rally Sport	Hyundai	Coupé	?	(South Korea) Kim Han Bong	(United Kingdom) Andrew Graham Walker	7
(South Korea) Kia Motorsport Korea	Kia	Sephia	?	(Australia) Rob Herridge	(Australia) Chris Randell	3, 7
(South Korea) Kia Motorsport Korea	Kia	Sephia	?	(Australia) Dean Herridge	(New Zealand) Rod van der Straaten	3, 7
(South Korea) Kia Motorsport Korea	Kia	Sephia	?	(South Korea) Park Jeong-Ryong	(Australia) Jim Carlton	3, 7
(Greece) Konstantinos Apostolou	Lancia	Delta HF Integrale	?	(Greece) Konstantinos Apostolou	(Greece) Mihalis Kriadis	4
(Belgium) Autostal Duindistel	Mazda	323 GT-R	?	(Belgium) Gaby Goudezeune	(Belgium) Filip De Pelsemaeker	4
(Greece) Technocar	SEAT	Ibiza GTi 16V	?	(Greece) "Stratissino"	(Greece) Tonia Pavli	4
(Spain) SEAT Sport	SEAT	Ibiza Kit Car	M	(Spain) Jesús Puras	(Spain) Carlos del Barrio	5, 7, 9
(Spain) SEAT Sport	SEAT	Ibiza Kit Car	M	(Germany) Erwin Weber	(Germany) Manfred Hiemer	5, 7
(Spain) SEAT Sport	SEAT	Ibiza Kit Car	M	(Spain) Antonio Rius	(Spain) Manuel Casanova	7, 9
(Spain) SEAT Sport	SEAT	Ibiza Kit Car	M	(Spain) Josep María Bardolet	(Spain) Joaquim Muntada	9
(Czech Republic) Škoda Motorsport	Škoda	Felicia Kit Car	M	(Czech Republic) Emil Triner	(Czech Republic) Pavel Štanc	5, 7, 9
(Czech Republic) Škoda Motorsport	Škoda	Felicia Kit Car	M	(Czech Republic) Pavel Sibera	(Czech Republic) Petr Gross	5, 7, 9
(Czech Republic) Škoda Motorsport	Škoda	Felicia Kit Car	M	(Sweden) Stig Blomqvist	(Sweden) Benny Melander	7
(Czech Republic) Škoda Motorsport	Škoda	Felicia Kit Car	M	(Belgium) Bernard Munster	(Belgium) Jean-François Elst	9
(Argentina) Cimauto Sport	Renault	Clio Williams	?	(Argentina) Gabriel Raies	(Argentina) Jose Maria Volta	5
(Argentina) Walter Suriani	Renault	Clio Williams	?	(Argentina) Walter Suriani	(Argentina) Raúl Rosso	5
Renault Team Sweden	Renault	Clio Williams	?	(Sweden) Jonas Kruse	(Sweden) Anders Dawidson	1
Renault Team Sweden	Renault	Mégane Maxi	?	(Sweden) Jonas Kruse	(Sweden) Anders Olsson	6
(Italy) Paolo Andreucci	Renault	Mégane Maxi	M	(Italy) Paolo Andreucci	(Italy) Simona Fedeli	8
(Italy) Husky S.R.L.	Renault	Mégane Maxi	M	(Italy) Piero Longhi	(Italy) Luigi Pirollo	8
(Italy) Mirabella Mille Miglia	Renault	Mégane Maxi	M	(Italy) Diego Oldrati	(Italy) Paolo Lizzi	8
(Spain) Renault Sport España	Renault	Mégane Maxi	M	(Spain) Oriol Gómez	(Spain) Marc Martí	9
(Taiwan) SanYang MIT Motorsport	Honda	Civic VTi	?	(United Kingdom) Alister McRae	(United Kingdom) David Senior	7
Daihatsu Australia	Daihatsu	Charade GTi	?	(Australia) Robert Nicoli	(Australia) Claire Parker	7
(Spain) Peugeot Sport España	Peugeot	306 S16	?	(Spain) Jaime Azcona	(Spain) Alfredo Rodríguez	9
(Spain) Peugeot Sport España	Peugeot	306 S16	?	(Spain) Manuel Muniente	(Spain) Joan Ibáñez Sotos	9

=== Group N Cup major entries ===
Team	Manufacturer	Car	Tyre	Drivers	Co-drivers	Rounds
Mitsubishi Ralliart Sweden	Mitsubishi	Lancer Evo III	M	(Sweden) Kenneth Bäcklund	(Sweden) Tord Andersson	1
Mitsubishi Ralliart Sweden	Mitsubishi	Lancer Evo III	M	(Sweden) Stig-Olov Walfridsson	(Sweden) Gunnar Barth	1
Mitsubishi Ralliart Germany	Mitsubishi	Lancer Evo III	P	(Germany) Uwe Nittel	(Sweden) Christina Thörner	1, 4–9
Mitsubishi Ralliart Germany	Mitsubishi	Lancer Evo III	P	(Argentina) Jorge Recalde	(Argentina) Martin Christie	4–9
(Estonia) Eesti Helkama Auto AS	Mitsubishi	Lancer Evo III	M	(Estonia) Ivar Raidam	(Estonia) Margus Karjane	1, 6
(Uruguay) Race-Rent Motorsport	Mitsubishi	Lancer Evo III	P	(Uruguay) Gustavo Trelles	(Argentina) Jorge Del Buono	3–9
(Indonesia) Chandra Alim	Mitsubishi	Lancer Evo III	?	(Indonesia) Chandra Alim	(Indonesia) Prihatin Kasiman	3
Mitsubishi Ralliart Indonesia	Mitsubishi	Lancer Evo III	?	(Indonesia) Bambang Hartono	(Indonesia) Agung Baskoro	3
(Japan) Toshiaki Endo	Mitsubishi	Lancer Evo III	?	(Japan) Toshiaki Endo	(Japan) Yutaka Yasunami	3
(Japan) Mitsubishi Ralliart Zushi	Mitsubishi	Lancer Evo III	?	(Japan) Yoshihiro Kataoka	(Japan) Satoshi Hayashi	3, 7
(Belgium) Renstal de Bokkenrijders	Mitsubishi	Lancer Evo III	M	(Belgium) Pascal Smets	(Belgium) Jean-Paul S'Heeren	4, 8
Esso Motorsports Finland	Mitsubishi	Lancer Evo III	?	(Finland) Olli Harkki	(Finland) Kari Mustalahti	6
(Italy) Jolly Club	Mitsubishi	Lancer Evo III	P	(Italy) Piergiorgio Bedini	(Italy) Luciano Tedeschini	6, 8
(Australia) Les Walkden Racing	Mitsubishi	Lancer Evo III	?	(Australia) Ed Ordynski	(Australia) Mark Stacey	7
(Australia) Michael Guest	Mitsubishi	Lancer Evo III	?	(Australia) Michael Guest	(Australia) Steve O'Brien-Pounde	7
(Japan) Masayuki Akaba	Mitsubishi	Lancer Evo III	?	(Japan) Masayuki Akaba	(Japan) Takako Akaba	7
(Italy) Antonello Fidanza	Mitsubishi	Lancer Evo III	?	(Italy) Antonello Fidanza	(Italy) Raffaele Farina	7–8
(France) Jacques Andreani	Mitsubishi	Lancer Evo III	M	(France) Jacques Andreani	(Belgium) Cédric Pirotte	9
(Sweden) Bilsport Magazine	Mitsubishi	Lancer Evo II	?	(Sweden) Gert Blomqvist	(Sweden) Lena Lindberg	1
Mitsubishi Ralliart Finland	Mitsubishi	Lancer Evo II	?	(Finland) Juha Kangas	(Finland) Jani Laaksonen	1
(Estonia) EMEX	Mitsubishi	Lancer Evo II	?	(Estonia) Riho Parts	(Estonia) Aare Kaaristo	1, 6
(Finland) Mikko Dahlman	Mitsubishi	Lancer Evo II	?	(Finland) Mikko Dahlman	(Finland) Risto Niukkanen	1, 6
(Indonesia) Resupra Auto Sport	Mitsubishi	Lancer Evo II	?	(Indonesia) Harun Nasution	(Indonesia) "Uche"	3
(Japan) Mikio Saito	Mitsubishi	Lancer Evo II	?	(Japan) Mikio Saito	(Japan) Masahiko Tanaka	3
(Argentina) Daniel Preto	Mitsubishi	Lancer Evo II	?	(Argentina) Daniel Preto	(Argentina) Ricardo Kember	5
(Sweden) MK Ratten	Mitsubishi	Galant VR-4	?	(Sweden) Anders Rådström	(Sweden) Lars-Ove Larsson	1
(Uruguay) Race-Rent Motorsport	Subaru	Impreza WRX	P	(Uruguay) Gustavo Trelles	(Argentina) Jorge Del Buono	1
Subaru Team Sweden	Subaru	Impreza WRX	?	(Sweden) Bror Danielsson	(Sweden) Arne Johansson	1
Subaru Rally Team Japan	Subaru	Impreza Wagon	?	(Kenya) Patrick Njiru	(Kenya) Rick Mathews	2
Subaru Rally Team Japan	Subaru	Impreza Wagon	?	(Japan) Hideaki Miyoshi	(Kenya) Tinu Khan	2
Subaru Rally Team Japan	Subaru	Impreza WRX	?	(Japan) Hideaki Miyoshi	(New Zealand) Colin Smith	7
Subaru Rally Team Japan	Subaru	Impreza WRX	?	(Kenya) Tanveer Alam	(Kenya) Tariq Alam	2
Subaru Rally Team Japan	Subaru	Impreza WRX	?	(Kenya) Jamil Khan	(Kenya) Peter Stone	2
(Kenya) Jim Heather-Hayes	Subaru	Impreza WRX	?	(Kenya) Jim Heather-Hayes	(Kenya) Surinder Thatthi	2
(Kenya) Nishit Patel	Subaru	Impreza WRX	?	(Kenya) Nishit Patel	(Kenya) Farakh Yusuf	2
(Japan) Tein Sport Junior Team	Subaru	Impreza WRX	M	(Japan) Shigeyuki Konishi	(Japan) Hakaru Ichino	3
(Japan) Tein Sport Junior Team	Subaru	Impreza WRX	M	(Japan) Shigeyuki Konishi	(Japan) Yoshimasa Nakahara	7
(Japan) Tein Sport Junior Team	Subaru	Impreza WRX	M	(Hong Kong) Michael Lieu	(Japan) Yoshimasa Nakahara	3
(Japan) Tein Sport Junior Team	Subaru	Impreza WRX	M	(Hong Kong) Michael Lieu	(Malaysia) Edmond Lim	7
(Italy) Piergiorgio Bedini	Ford	Escort RS Cosworth	P	(Italy) Piergiorgio Bedini	(Italy) Luciano Tedeschini	1
(Italy) Scuderia Città di Monselice	Ford	Escort RS Cosworth	P	(Italy) Giovanni Manfrinato	(Italy) Claudio Condotta	8
(Italy) Fabio Bolognesi	Ford	Escort RS Cosworth	P	(Italy) Fabio Bolognesi	(Italy) G Tofani	8
(Italy) Luca Baldini	Ford	Escort RS Cosworth	P	(Italy) Luca Baldini	(Italy) Massimo Agostinelli	8
(Italy) Roberto Cirio	Ford	Escort RS Cosworth	?	(Italy) Roberto Cirio	(Italy) Umberto Tesi	8
(Italy) Alberto Alberti	Ford	Escort RS Cosworth	?	(Italy) Giancarlo Storti	(Italy) Andrea Nicoli	9
(Greece) "Simetra"	Ford	Sierra RS Cosworth	?	(Greece) "Simetra"	(Greece) "Azet"	4
(United Kingdom) Mark Tilbury	Nissan	Pulsar GTi-R	?	(United Kingdom) Mark Tilbury	(Kenya) Bill Kirk	2
(Japan) Tomoyuki Yamanaka	Nissan	Pulsar GTi-R	?	(Japan) Tomoyuki Yamanaka	(Japan) Kohei Kusaka	4
(Greece) Níkos Politanos	Nissan	Sunny GTI-R	?	(Greece) Níkos Politanos	(Greece) Giorgos Vlahos	4
(Austria) Stefan Reininger	Renault	Clio Williams	?	(Austria) Stefan Reininger	(Austria) Robert Csösz	1, 4–5
(Spain) Gamace MC Competición	Renault	Clio Williams	M	(Spain) Jordi Grinyó	(Spain) Samira Lanaya	9
(South Korea) Kia Motorsport Korea	Kia	Sephia	?	(Australia) Dean Herridge	(New Zealand) Rod van der Straaten	3, 7
(Malaysia) Petronas EON Racing Team	Proton	Wira 4WD	Y	(Malaysia) Karamjit Singh	(Malaysia) Allen Oh	3, 7
(Malaysia) Petronas EON Racing Team	Proton	Wira 4WD	Y	(Japan) Katsuhiko Taguchi	(Colombia) Fred Gocentas	7
(Greece) Pavlos Moschoutis	Mazda	323 GT-R	M	(Greece) Pavlos Moschoutis	(Greece) Giorgos Petropoulos	4
Andorra Auto Club	SEAT	Ibiza GTi 16V	M	(Andorra) Ferran Font	(Spain) Eduard Andueza	5, 7
(Spain) JLM Team	SEAT	Ibiza GTi 16V	M	(Spain) David Nafría	(Spain) F. Gallego	9
(Chile) Alejandro Schmauk	Daewoo	Cielo	?	(Chile) Alejandro Schmauk	(Chile) Jaime Rojas	5
(Argentina) Norberto Gomez	Daewoo	Cielo	?	(Argentina) Norberto Gomez	(Argentina) Gustavo Dechecchi	5
(Chile) Enrique Levalle	Suzuki	Swift GTi	?	(Chile) Enrique Levalle	(Argentina) Heriberto Carlos Ortiz	5
(Argentina) Marcelo Regunaschi	Suzuki	Swift GTi	?	(Argentina) Marcelo Regunaschi	(Argentina) Angel Blázquez	5
(Finland) Pasi Hagström	Toyota	Celica GT-Four (ST205)	M	(Finland) Pasi Hagström	(Finland) Tero Gardemeister	6
(Italy) Promosport Italia	Opel	Astra GSi 16V	?	(Italy) Eugenio Lozza	(Italy) Antonella Fiorendi	8
(Italy) Promosport Italia	Opel	Astra GSi 16V	?	(Italy) Marco Tempestini	(Italy) Michele Giovanni Viel	8
(Spain) A.I.A	Peugeot	106 Rallye	M	(Spain) Miguel Fuster	(Spain) José Vicente Medina	9

== Results and standings ==
=== Drivers' championship ===
Pos	Driver	SWE (Sweden)	KEN (Kenya)	INA (Indonesia)	GRE (Greece)	ARG (Argentina)	FIN (Finland)	AUS (Australia)	ITA (Italy)	ESP (Spain)	Pts
1	(Finland) Tommi Mäkinen	1	1	Ret	2	1	1	1	Ret	5	123
2	(United Kingdom) Colin McRae	3	4	Ret	1	Ret	Ret	4	1	1	92
3	(Spain) Carlos Sainz	2	Ret	1	3	2	Ret	3	2	Ret	89
4	(Sweden) Kenneth Eriksson	5	2	Ret	5	3	5	2	5	7	78
5	(Italy) Piero Liatti	12	5	2	4	7	DNS	7	Ret	2	56
6	(Belgium) Bruno Thiry				6	5	11	6	3	3	44
7	(Finland) Juha Kankkunen	4		3			2				37
8	(Belgium) Freddy Loix				7				4	4	24
9	(United Kingdom) Richard Burns			Ret		4		5		Ret	18
10	(Finland) Marcus Grönholm	7					4				14
11	(Italy) Gilberto Pianezzola				8	6			7		13
12=	(Kenya) Ian Duncan		3								12
12=	(Finland) Jarmo Kytölehto						3		Ret	Ret	12
14	(Japan) Yoshio Fujimoto			4				9			12
15	(Sweden) Thomas Rådström	6			Ret		6			Ret	12
16	(France) Patrick Bernardini				9	9			10	6	11
17	(Indonesia) Reza Pribadi			5							8
18	(Sweden) Stig Blomqvist	8	7					Ret			7
19	(Portugal) Rui Madeira				Ret	8	9		Ret	9	7
20=	(Japan) Kenjiro Shinozuka		6								6
20=	(Hong Kong) Michael Lieu			6				Ret			6
20=	(Italy) Franco Cunico								6		6
23=	(Japan) Shigeyuki Konishi			7				25			4
23=	(Finland) Sebastian Lindholm	Ret					7				4
25	(France) Didier Auriol	10							8		4
26	(Italy) Angelo Medeghini				Ret	12	10		9	10	4
27=	(Japan) Hideaki Miyoshi		8					29			3
27=	(Indonesia) Irvan Gading			8							3
27=	(Finland) Lasse Lampi						8				3
27=	(New Zealand) Peter 'Possum' Bourne							8			3
27=	(Spain) Oriol Gómez									8	3
32=	(Sweden) Tomas Jansson	9									2
32=	(Kenya) Patrick Njiru		9								2
32=	(Indonesia) Chandra Alim			9							2
35=	(Kenya) Jonathan Toroitich		10								1
35=	(Indonesia) Bambang Hartono			10							1
35=	(Monaco) Jean-Pierre Richelmi				10						1
35=	(Germany) Uwe Nittel	16			14	10	16	DSQ	Ret	16	1
35=	(Australia) Ed Ordynski							10			1
Pos	Driver	SWE (Sweden)	KEN (Kenya)	INA (Indonesia)	GRE (Greece)	ARG (Argentina)	FIN (Finland)	AUS (Australia)	ITA (Italy)	ESP (Spain)	Pts

Key
Colour	Result
Gold	Winner
Silver	2nd place
Bronze	3rd place
Green	Points finish
Blue	Non-points finish
Blue	Non-classified finish (NC)
Purple	Did not finish (Ret)
Black	Excluded (EX)
Black	Disqualified (DSQ)
White	Did not start (DNS)
White	Cancelled (C)
Blank	Withdrew entry from the event (WD)

=== Manufacturers' championship ===
Each works team had to nominate up to three drivers 30 days before each event; only two best placed nominated drivers were eligible to score points for the manufacturers' championship.

Pos.	Manufacturer	No.	SWE (Sweden)	KEN (Kenya)	INA (Indonesia)	GRE (Greece)	ARG (Argentina)	FIN (Finland)	AUS (Australia)	ITA (Italy)	ESP (Spain)	Points
1	(Japan) Subaru	1	3	4	Ret	1	Ret	Ret	4	1	1	401
1	(Japan) Subaru	2	5	2	Ret	(5)	3	5	2	5	(7)	401
1	(Japan) Subaru	3	(10)	(5)	2	4	7		(7)	Ret	2	401
2	(Japan) Mitsubishi	7	1	1	Ret	2	1	1	1	Ret	5	322
2	(Japan) Mitsubishi	8	14	6	Ret	14	4	8	5	8	Ret	322
2	(Japan) Mitsubishi	9			Ret		(10)	Ret	(10)	Ret		322
3	(United States) Ford	4	2	Ret	1	3	2	Ret	3	2	Ret	299
3	(United States) Ford	5	(11)	7	Ret	6	5	11	6	3	3	299
3	(United States) Ford	6	8		Ret							299
Pos.	Manufacturer	No.	SWE (Sweden)	KEN (Kenya)	INA (Indonesia)	GRE (Greece)	ARG (Argentina)	FIN (Finland)	AUS (Australia)	ITA (Italy)	ESP (Spain)	Points

Key
Colour	Result
Gold	Winner
Silver	2nd place
Bronze	3rd place
Green	Points finish
Blue	Non-points finish
Blue	Non-classified finish (NC)
Purple	Did not finish (Ret)
Black	Excluded (EX)
Black	Disqualified (DSQ)
White	Did not start (DNS)
White	Cancelled (C)
Blank	Withdrew entry from the event (WD)

=== Group N Cup ===
Pos	Driver	SWE (Sweden)	KEN (Kenya)	INA (Indonesia)	GRE (Greece)	ARG (Argentina)	FIN (Finland)	AUS (Australia)	ITA (Italy)	ESP (Spain)	Pts
1	(Uruguay) Gustavo Trelles	Ret		Ret	2	2	4	5	1	1	55
2	(Germany) Uwe Nittel	3			1	1	3	Ret	Ret	2	50
3	(Belgium) Pascal Smets				3				2		17
4	(Sweden) Kenneth Bäcklund	1									13
4	(Japan) Hideaki Miyoshi		1					14			13
4	(Hong Kong) Michael Lieu			1				Ret			13
4	(Finland) Pasi Hagström						1				13
4	(Australia) Ed Ordynski							1			13
9	(Sweden) Stig-Olov Walfridsson	2									10
9	(Kenya) Patrick Njiru		2								10
9	(Japan) Shigeyuki Konishi			2				11			10
9	(Finland) Olli Harkki						2				10
9	(Japan) Yoshihiro Kataoka							2			10
14	(Argentina) Jorge Recalde				Ret	Ret	6	Ret	Ret	4	8
15	(Kenya) Jim Heather-Hayes		3								7
15	(Indonesia) Chandra Alim			3							7
15	(Argentina) Daniel Alejandro Preto					3					7
15	(Malaysia) Karamjit Singh			Ret				3			7
15	(Italy) Giovanni Manfrinato								3		7
15	(France) Jacques Andreani									3	7
Pos	Driver	SWE (Sweden)	KEN (Kenya)	INA (Indonesia)	GRE (Greece)	ARG (Argentina)	FIN (Finland)	AUS (Australia)	ITA (Italy)	ESP (Spain)	Pts

Key
Colour	Result
Gold	Winner
Silver	2nd place
Bronze	3rd place
Green	Points finish
Blue	Non-points finish
Blue	Non-classified finish (NC)
Purple	Did not finish (Ret)
Black	Excluded (EX)
Black	Disqualified (DSQ)
White	Did not start (DNS)
White	Cancelled (C)
Blank	Withdrew entry from the event (WD)

== Events ==
1996 World Rally Championship event map
Black = Tarmac	Brown = Gravel	Blue = Snow/Ice	Red = Mixed Surface

Rally Name	Start-End Date	Podium Drivers (Finishing Time)	Podium Cars
(Sweden) Swedish Rally	9–11 February	1. (Finland) Tommi Mäkinen (4h:37m:10s); 2. (Spain) Carlos Sainz (4h:37m:33s); 3. (United Kingdom) Colin McRae (4h:38m:15s)	1. Mitsubishi Lancer Evolution III; 2. Ford Escort RS Cosworth; 3. Subaru Impreza 555
(Kenya) Safari Rally	5–7 April	1. (Finland) Tommi Mäkinen (12h:41m:24s); 2. (Sweden) Kenneth Eriksson (12h:55m:40s); 3. (Kenya) Ian Duncan (13h:23m:24s)	1. Mitsubishi Lancer Evolution III; 2. Subaru Impreza 555; 3. Toyota Celica GT-Four ST205
Rally Indonesia	10–12 May	1. (Spain) Carlos Sainz (5h:30m:00s); 2. (Italy) Piero Liatti (5h:30m:23s); 3. (Finland) Juha Kankkunen (5h:31m:02s)	1. Ford Escort RS Cosworth; 2. Subaru Impreza 555; 3. Toyota Celica GT-Four ST205
(Greece) Acropolis Rally	2–4 June	1. (United Kingdom) Colin McRae (5h:33m:12s); 2. (Finland) Tommi Mäkinen (5h:34m:02s); 3. (Spain) Carlos Sainz (5h:36m:33s)	1. Subaru Impreza 555; 2. Mitsubishi Lancer Evolution III; 3. Ford Escort RS Cosworth
Rally Argentina	4–6 July	1. (Finland) Tommi Mäkinen (5h:48m:42s); 2. (Spain) Carlos Sainz (5h:50m:17s); 3. (Sweden) Kenneth Eriksson (5h:53m:21s)	1. Mitsubishi Lancer Evolution III; 2. Ford Escort RS Cosworth; 3. Subaru Impreza 555
(Finland) 1000 Lakes Rally	23–26 August	1. (Finland) Tommi Mäkinen (4h:04m:13s); 2. (Finland) Juha Kankkunen (4h:04m:59s); 3. (Finland) Jarmo Kytölehto (4h:06m:50s)	1. Mitsubishi Lancer Evolution III; 2. Toyota Celica GT-Four ST205; 3. Ford Escort RS Cosworth
Rally Australia	13–16 September	1. (Finland) Tommi Mäkinen (4h:08m:50s); 2. (Sweden) Kenneth Eriksson (4h:10m:07s); 3. (Spain) Carlos Sainz (4h:10m:11s)	1. Mitsubishi Lancer Evolution III; 2. Subaru Impreza 555; 3. Ford Escort RS Cosworth
(Italy) Rallye Sanremo	13–16 October	1. (United Kingdom) Colin McRae (4h:26m:57s); 2. (Spain) Carlos Sainz (4h:27m:19s); 3. (Belgium) Bruno Thiry (4h:29m:06s)	1. Subaru Impreza 555; 2. Ford Escort RS Cosworth; 3. Ford Escort RS Cosworth
(Spain) Rally Catalunya	4–6 November	1. (United Kingdom) Colin McRae (4h:14m:20s); 2. (Italy) Piero Liatti (4h:14m:27s); 3. (Belgium) Bruno Thiry (4h:15m:38s)	1. Subaru Impreza 555; 2. Subaru Impreza 555; 3. Ford Escort RS Cosworth

== FIA 2 Litre World Cup For Manufacturers ==
Pos	Manufacturer	R1	R2	R3	R4	R5	R6	R7	R8	Pts
1	SEAT	(25)	60	(13)	36	46	47	46	39	274
2	Renault	36	39	53	64	-	-	48	25	265
3	Skoda	39	44	-	46	35	60	(16)	40	264
4	Peugeot	46	9	54	-	9	-	40	10	168
5	General Motors Europe	43	31	11	-	-	-	18	-	103
6	Suzuki	-	-	-	16	36	-	-	-	52
=	Hyundai	-	-	-	-	21	31	-	-	52
8	Daihatsu	-	-	-	-	15	35	-	-	50
9	Honda	9	6	-	-	8	-	-	20	43
10	Nissan	-	-	-	-	-	-	-	42	42
11	Kia	-	-	-	-	-	32	-	-	32
=	Toyota	-	1	-	-	31	-	-	-	32
13	Renault Argentina	-	-	-	28	-	-	-	-	28
14	Citroën	20	-	-	-	-	-	7	-	27
15	Daewoo	-	-	-	26	-	-	-	-	26
16	Toyota Australia	-	-	-	-	-	21	-	-	21
17	Volkswagen	-	-	3	-	-	-	-	15	18
18	Ford	-	-	-	-	-	-	15	-	15
19	Mitsubishi	-	-	-	-	14	-	-	-	14
20	Fiat	10	-	-	-	-	-	-	-	10

() Denotes dropped score
