= 1994 World Rally Championship =

22nd season of the FIA World Rally Championship

Champions
- World Drivers' Champion: Didier Auriol
- World Manufacturers' Champion: Toyota

Seasons
- ← 1993 1995 →

The 1994 World Rally Championship was the 22nd season of the FIA World Rally Championship. The season consisted of 10 rallies. The drivers' world championship was won by Didier Auriol in a Toyota Celica Turbo 4WD, ahead of Carlos Sainz and Juha Kankkunen. The manufacturers' title was won by Toyota, ahead of Subaru and Ford.

== Calendar ==
In 1994 started a system of rotation on the World Rally Championship. Because of this, Sweden, Australia and Spain were dropped from the championship and instead were run as part of 1994 FIA 2-Litre World Rally Cup. This reduced number of full WRC events to ten, the lowest number since 1974–76.

Rd.	Start date	Finish date	Rally	Rally headquarters	Surface	Stages	Distance
1	24 January	27 January	(Monaco) 62nd Rallye Automobile Monte Carlo	Monte Carlo	Mixed	22	588.43 km
2	1 March	4 March	28th TAP Rallye de Portugal	Estoril, Lisbon	Mixed	36	571.82 km
3	31 March	3 April	(Kenya) 42nd Trust Bank Safari Rally	Nairobi	Gravel	??	2393 km
4	5 May	7 May	38th Tour de Corse - Rallye de France	Ajaccio, Corsica	Tarmac	23	545.48 km
5	29 May	31 May	(Greece) 41st Acropolis Rally	Athens	Gravel	33	503.53 km
6	30 June	2 July	14th Rally YPF Argentina	Carlos Paz, Córdoba	Gravel	29	563.90 km
7	29 July	31 July	25th Rothmans Rally New Zealand	Manukau, Auckland	Gravel	30	519.31 km
8	26 August	28 August	(Finland) 44th Neste 1000 Lakes Rally	Jyväskylä, Central Finland	Gravel	35	522.76 km
9	10 October	12 October	(Italy) 36th Rallye Sanremo - Rallye d'Italia	Sanremo, Liguria	Mixed	26	526.03 km
10	20 November	23 November	(United Kingdom) 50th Network Q RAC Rally	Chester, Cheshire	Gravel	29	520.66 km

== Teams and drivers ==
=== Manufacturer entries ===
Team	Manufacturer	Car	Tyre	Driver	Co-Driver	Rounds
(Japan) Toyota Castrol Team	Toyota	Celica Turbo 4WD (ST185)	M	(Finland) Juha Kankkunen	(United Kingdom) Nicky Grist	1–8
(Japan) Toyota Castrol Team	Toyota	Celica GT-Four (ST205)	M	(Finland) Juha Kankkunen	(United Kingdom) Nicky Grist	9–10
(Japan) Toyota Castrol Team	Toyota	Celica Turbo 4WD (ST185)	M	(France) Didier Auriol	(France) Bernard Occelli	All
(Japan) Toyota Castrol Team	Toyota	Celica Turbo 4WD (ST185)	M	(Italy) Andrea Aghini	(Italy) Sauro Farnocchia	2, 4
(Japan) Toyota Castrol Team	Toyota	Celica Turbo 4WD (ST185)	M	(Kenya) Ian Duncan	(Kenya) David Williamson	3
(Japan) Toyota Castrol Team	Toyota	Celica Turbo 4WD (ST185)	M	(Japan) Yoshio Fujimoto	(Japan) Hakaru Ichino	3
(Japan) Toyota Castrol Team	Toyota	Celica Turbo 4WD (ST185)	M	(Japan) Yoshio Fujimoto	(Sweden) Arne Hertz	5, 7, 10
(Japan) Toyota Castrol Team	Toyota	Celica Turbo 4WD (ST185)	M	(Finland) Marcus Grönholm	(Finland) Voitto Silander	8
(Japan) 555 Subaru WRT	Subaru	Impreza 555	P	(Spain) Carlos Sainz	(Spain) Luis Moya	1–2, 4–10
(Japan) 555 Subaru WRT	Subaru	Impreza 555	P	(United Kingdom) Colin McRae	(United Kingdom) Derek Ringer	1–2, 4–7, 9–10
(Japan) 555 Subaru WRT	Subaru	Impreza 555	P	(United Kingdom) Richard Burns	(United Kingdom) Robert Reid	7, 10
(Japan) 555 Subaru WRT	Subaru	Impreza 555	P	(New Zealand) Peter 'Possum' Bourne	(New Zealand) Tony Sircombe	7
(Japan) 555 Subaru WRT	Subaru	Impreza WRX (Grp. N)	B	(Kenya) Patrick Njiru	(Kenya) Abdul Sidi	3
(Japan) 555 Subaru WRT	Subaru	Impreza WRX (Grp. N)	B	(United Kingdom) Richard Burns	(United Kingdom) Robert Reid	3
(United States) Ford Motor Co. Ltd.	Ford	Escort RS Cosworth	M	(Italy) Miki Biasion	(Italy) Tiziano Siviero	1–2, 4–7, 9–10
(United States) Ford Motor Co. Ltd.	Ford	Escort RS Cosworth	M	(France) François Delecour	(France) Daniel Grataloup	1–2, 8–10
(United States) Ford Motor Co. Ltd.	Ford	Escort RS Cosworth	M	(Belgium) Bruno Thiry	(Belgium) Stéphane Prévot	1–2, 4, 6, 8–10
(United States) Ford Motor Co. Ltd.	Ford	Escort RS Cosworth	M	(Italy) Gianfranco Cunico	(Italy) Stefano Evangelisti	4
(United States) Ford Motor Co. Ltd.	Ford	Escort RS Cosworth	M	(United Kingdom) Malcolm Wilson	(United Kingdom) Bryan Thomas	5, 10
(United States) Ford Motor Co. Ltd.	Ford	Escort RS Cosworth	P	(Finland) Ari Vatanen	(Italy) Fabrizia Pons	5, 8
(United States) Ford Motor Co. Ltd.	Ford	Escort RS Cosworth	M	(Finland) Ari Vatanen	(Italy) Fabrizia Pons	6–7
(United States) Ford Motor Co. Ltd.	Ford	Escort RS Cosworth	M	(Finland) Tommi Mäkinen	(Finland) Seppo Harjanne	8
(United States) Ford Motor Co. Ltd.	Ford	Escort RS Cosworth	M	(Sweden) Stig Blomqvist	(Sweden) Benny Melander	10
(Japan) Mitsubishi Ralliart	Mitsubishi	Lancer Evo I	M	(Germany) Armin Schwarz	(Germany) Klaus Wicha	1
(Japan) Mitsubishi Ralliart	Mitsubishi	Lancer Evo II	M	(Germany) Armin Schwarz	(Germany) Klaus Wicha	5, 7, 9
(Japan) Mitsubishi Ralliart	Mitsubishi	Lancer Evo I	M	(Sweden) Kenneth Eriksson	(Sweden) Staffan Parmander	1
(Japan) Mitsubishi Ralliart	Mitsubishi	Lancer Evo II	M	(Sweden) Kenneth Eriksson	(Sweden) Staffan Parmander	5, 7
(Japan) Mitsubishi Ralliart	Mitsubishi	Lancer Evo I	M	(Japan) Kenjiro Shinozuka	(Finland) Pentti Kuukkala	3
(Japan) Mitsubishi Ralliart	Mitsubishi	Lancer Evo II	M	(Finland) Tommi Mäkinen	(Finland) Seppo Harjanne	9

=== Non Manufacturer Entries ===
Major entries not registered as manufacturers
Team	Manufacturer	Car	Tyre	Drivers	Co-drivers	Rounds
(France) Société Diac	Renault	Clio Williams	M	(France) Jean Ragnotti	(France) Gilles Thimonier	1, 4
(France) Société Diac	Renault	Clio Williams	M	(France) Alain Oreille	(France) Jean-Marc Andrié	1, 4
(France) Société Diac	Renault	Clio Williams	M	(France) Philippe Bugalski	(France) Thierry Renaud	4
(France) Société Diac	Renault	Clio Williams	M	(France) Serge Jordan	(France) Jack Boyère	4
(France) Société Diac	Renault	Clio Williams	M	(France) Claude Balesi	(France) Jean-Paul Cirindini	4
Renault Portugal	Renault	Clio Williams	M	(Portugal) José Carlos Macedo	(Portugal) Miguel Borges	2
(Italy) Renault Rally Team	Renault	Clio Williams	M	(Italy) Renato Travaglia	(Italy) Alessandro Mari	9
(Italy) Renault Rally Team	Renault	Clio Williams	M	(Italy) Diego Oldrati	(Italy) Paolo Vinzioli	9
(Italy) Italian Promotor Sport	Renault	Clio Williams	M	(Italy) Paolo Andreucci	(Italy) Simona Fedeli	9
(Argentina) Gabriel Raies	Renault	18 GTX	?	(Argentina) Gabriel Raies	(Argentina) Jose Maria Volta	6
(Argentina) Juan Pablo Raies	Renault	18 GTX	?	(Argentina) Juan Pablo Raies	(Argentina) Rodolfo Amelio Ortiz	6
(Czech Republic) Škoda Motorsport	Škoda	Favorit 136 L	M	(Czech Republic) Pavel Sibera	(Czech Republic) Petr Gross	1–2, 5, 8–10
(Czech Republic) Škoda Motorsport	Škoda	Favorit 136 L	M	(Czech Republic) Vladimír Berger	(Czech Republic) Pavel Štanc	1
(Czech Republic) Škoda Motorsport	Škoda	Favorit 136 L	M	(Czech Republic) Emil Triner	(Czech Republic) Jiří Klíma	2, 5, 8–10
(Italy) Mauro Rally Tuning	Lancia	Delta HF Integrale	P	(Italy) Maurizio Verini	(Italy) Baldovino Dassu	1
(Italy) Michele Gregis	Lancia	Delta HF Integrale	P	(Italy) Michele Gregis	(Italy) Massimo Chiapponi	1
(Portugal) Duriforte Construções	Lancia	Delta HF Integrale	P	(Portugal) Jorge Bica	(Portugal) João Sena	2, 9
(Italy) Astra Racing	Lancia	Delta HF Integrale	P	(Italy) Alessandro Fiorio	(Italy) Vittorio Brambilla	5
(Italy) Astra Racing	Lancia	Delta HF Integrale	P	(Italy) "Artemio"	(Italy) Aleandro Dal Monte	9
(Greece) Armodios Vovos	Lancia	Delta HF Integrale	M	(Greece) Armodios Vovos	(Greece) Kóstas Fertakis	5
(Germany) Nikolai Burkart	Opel	Astra GSi 16V	?	(Germany) Nikolai Burkart	(Germany) Regine Rausch	1
Opel Team Belgium	Opel	Astra GSi 16V	M	(Belgium) Grégoire de Mevius	(Belgium) Willy Lux	2, 5, 8–10
Opel Team Belgium	Opel	Astra GSi 16V	M	(Belgium) Freddy Loix	(Belgium) Sven Smeets	8–9
(France) Grenoble Sport Auto	Opel	Astra GSi 16V	P	(France) Yves Loubet	(France) Dominique Savignoni	4
(United Kingdom) Nissan F2	Nissan	Sunny GTi	P	(Finland) Tommi Mäkinen	(Finland) Seppo Harjanne	2, 10
(United Kingdom) Nissan F2	Nissan	Sunny GTi	P	(Greece) "Stratissino"	(Greece) Tonia Pavli	5
(United Kingdom) Nissan F2	Nissan	Sunny GTi	P	(United Kingdom) Alister McRae	(United Kingdom) David Senior	8–10
(United Kingdom) Nissan F2	Nissan	Sunny GTi	P	(Finland) Ari Mökkönen	(Finland) Risto Virtanen	8
(Italy) Alessandro Fiorio	Ford	Escort RS Cosworth	M	(Italy) Alessandro Fiorio	(Italy) Vittorio Brambilla	2
(Portugal) Totta Peres Competição	Ford	Escort RS Cosworth	M	(Portugal) Fernando Peres	(Portugal) Ricardo Caldeira	2
(Portugal) Rodamsport	Ford	Escort RS Cosworth	M	(Portugal) José Miguel	(Portugal) António Manuel	2
(France) Yacco	Ford	Escort RS Cosworth	M	(France) Patrick Bernardini	(France) Rocky Demedardi	4
(Germany) SMS AG Revo Ingenieure	Ford	Escort RS Cosworth	P	(Austria) Raimund Baumschlager	(Austria) Manfred Hiemer	5, 8
(Germany) SMS AG Revo Ingenieure	Ford	Escort RS Cosworth	P	(Finland) Ari Vatanen	(Italy) Fabrizia Pons	10
(Greece) Leonídas Kirkos	Ford	Escort RS Cosworth	M	(Greece) Leonídas Kirkos	(Greece) Ioánnis Stavropoulos	5
(New Zealand) Brian Stokes	Ford	Escort RS Cosworth	M	(New Zealand) Brian Stokes	(New Zealand) Jeff Judd	7
Ford Team Finland	Ford	Escort RS Cosworth	M	(Finland) Sebastian Lindholm	(Finland) Timo Hantunen	8
(Finland) Mika Sohlberg	Ford	Escort RS Cosworth	M	(Finland) Mika Sohlberg	(Finland) Risto Mannisenmäki	8
(Italy) Jolly Club	Ford	Escort RS Cosworth	P	(Italy) Gianfranco Cunico	(Italy) Stefano Evangelisti	9
(Italy) Jolly Club	Ford	Escort RS Cosworth	P	(United Kingdom) Malcolm Wilson	(United Kingdom) Bryan Thomas	9
(South Africa) Jan Habig	Ford	Escort RS Cosworth	?	(South Africa) Jan Habig	(South Africa) Douglas Judd	10
(United Kingdom) Ford Motorsport	Ford	Escort RS 2000 MKVI	M	(United Kingdom) Gwyndaf Evans	(United Kingdom) Howard Davies	10
(Austria) Remus Racing	Audi	Coupé S2	M	(Austria) Raphael Sperrer	(Austria) Ernest Loidl	2
(Austria) Stohl Racing	Audi	Coupé S2	M	(Austria) Rudolf Stohl	(Germany) Jürgen Bertl	3
(Austria) Stohl Racing	Audi	Coupé S2	M	(Austria) Rudolf Stohl	(Austria) Peter Diekmann	6
(Austria) Stohl Racing	Audi	Coupé S2	M	(Austria) Manfred Stohl	(Austria) Peter Diekmann	5
(Austria) Stohl Racing	Audi	Coupé S2	M	(Austria) Manfred Stohl	(Germany) Kay Gerlach	7
(Uganda) Karim Hirji	Toyota	Celica GT-4 (ST165)	?	(Uganda) Karim Hirji	(Uganda) Frank Nekusa	3
(Kenya) Jonathan Toroitich	Toyota	Celica Turbo 4WD (ST185)	?	(Kenya) Jonathan Toroitich	(Kenya) Ibrahim Choge	3
(Zambia) Satwant Singh	Toyota	Celica Turbo 4WD (ST185)	?	(Zambia) Satwant Singh	(Kenya) Surinder Thatthi	3
(Sweden) Vännäs MK	Toyota	Celica Turbo 4WD (ST185)	M	(Sweden) Thomas Rådström	(Sweden) Lars Bäckman	8
(Finland) Pasi Hagström	Toyota	Celica Turbo 4WD (ST185)	M	(Finland) Pasi Hagström	(Finland) Tero Gardemeister	8
(Italy) H.F. Grifone SRL	Toyota	Celica Turbo 4WD (ST185)	M	(Italy) Gilberto Pianezzola	(Italy) Loris Roggia	9
(Italy) H.F. Grifone SRL	Toyota	Celica Turbo 4WD (ST185)	M	(Italy) Andrea Aghini	(Italy) Sauro Farnocchia	9
(Italy) H.F. Grifone SRL	Toyota	Celica Turbo 4WD (ST185)	M	(Italy) Piero Longhi	(Italy) Flavio Zanella	9
(Kenya) Rob Hellier	Mitsubishi	Galant VR-4	?	(Kenya) Rob Hellier	(Kenya) Philip Valentine	3
Mitsubishi Ralliart Finland	Mitsubishi	Galant VR-4	Y	(Finland) Lasse Lampi	(Finland) Pentti Kuukkala	8
(Kenya) Azar Anwar	Subaru	Legacy Estate	?	(Kenya) Azar Anwar	(Kenya) Shailen Shah	3
(New Zealand) Joe McAndrew	Subaru	Legacy RS	P	(New Zealand) Joe McAndrew	(New Zealand) Bob Haldane	7
(Italy) A.R.T. Engineering	Subaru	Impreza 555	P	(Italy) Piero Liatti	(Italy) Luigi Pirollo	9
(Kenya) Chemigas Limited	Volkswagen	Golf II GTi 16V	?	(Kenya) Sammy Aslam	(Kenya) Joey Ghose	3
(France) Marco Massarotto	BMW	M3 E30	P	(France) Marco Massarotto	(France) Jean-Pierre Gordon	4
(France) Peugeot Sport	Peugeot	106 Rallye	M	(France) Fabien Doenlen	(France) Hervé Sauvage	4
(United Kingdom) Peugeot Sport Great Britain	Peugeot	306 S16	M	(United Kingdom) Martin Rowe	(United Kingdom) Chris Wood	10
(Russia) Russian Automobile Federation	Lada	Samara 21083	?	(Russia) Aleksandr Nikonenko	(Russia) Sergey Talantsev	5, 8
(Russia) Russian Automobile Federation	Lada	Samara 21083	?	(Russia) Sergey Alyasov	(Russia) Vladlen Ishimov	5, 8
(Japan) Suzuki Sport	Suzuki	Swift GTi MK2	S	(Japan) Nobuhiro Tajima	(Australia) Ross Runnalls	7
(United Kingdom) Vauxhall Motorsport	Vauxhall	Astra GSI 16V	M	(United Kingdom) David Llewellin	(United Kingdom) Ian Grindrod	10

=== FIA Group N Cup major entries ===
Team	Manufacturer	Car	Tyre	Drivers	Co-drivers	Rounds
(Spain) Jesús Puras	Ford	Escort RS Cosworth	M	(Spain) Jesús Puras	(Spain) Álex Romaní	1, 10
(Spain) Jesús Puras	Ford	Escort RS Cosworth	M	(Spain) Jesús Puras	(Spain) Carlos del Barrio	2, 4, 6–7, 9
(Monaco) Pierre-Manuel Jenot	Ford	Escort RS Cosworth	M	(Monaco) Pierre-Manuel Jenot	(France) "Slo"	1
(Monaco) Franck Phillips	Ford	Escort RS Cosworth	?	(Monaco) Franck Phillips	(France) Olivier Peyret	1
(Monaco) "Tchine"	Ford	Escort RS Cosworth	M	(Monaco) "Tchine"	(France) Jean-Pierre Fricout	1
(France) Daniel Ducruet	Ford	Escort RS Cosworth	M	(France) Daniel Ducruet	(Monaco) Freddy Delorme	1, 9
(Austria) Kris Rosenberger	Ford	Escort RS Cosworth	P	(Austria) Kris Rosenberger	(Germany) Klaus Wendel	1–2, 4–5, 7, 9
(Portugal) Albano Costa	Ford	Escort RS Cosworth	?	(Portugal) Albano Costa	(Portugal) Mendes Marques	2
(United Kingdom) Marlboro Team Ford	Ford	Escort RS Cosworth	M	(United Arab Emirates) Mohammed Ben Sulayem	(Republic of Ireland) Ronan Morgan	2, 4–5
(Argentina) Mike Little Preparations	Ford	Escort RS Cosworth	?	(Argentina) Carlos Menem jr.	(Argentina) Victor Zucchini	2, 4–6
(Argentina) Mike Little Preparations	Ford	Escort RS Cosworth	?	(Argentina) Jorge Bescham	(Argentina) José Garcia	6
(Argentina) Mike Little Preparations	Ford	Escort RS Cosworth	?	(Republic of Ireland) Richie Holfeld	(United Kingdom) Ed Morgan	10
(France) Jean-Jacques Padovani	Ford	Escort RS Cosworth	?	(France) Jean-Jacques Padovani	(France) Guy Voillemier	4
(France) François Faggianelli	Ford	Escort RS Cosworth	?	(France) François Faggianelli	(France) Jean-Dominique Mattei	4
(United Kingdom) Shell Helix Motor Oils	Ford	Escort RS Cosworth	P	(United Kingdom) Jonny Milner	(United Kingdom) Steve Turvey	10
(United Kingdom) Jeremy Easson	Ford	Escort RS Cosworth	D	(United Kingdom) Jeremy Easson	(United Kingdom) Alun Cook	10
(United Kingdom) Steve Petch	Ford	Escort RS Cosworth	?	(United Kingdom) Steve Petch	(United Kingdom) Peter Croft	10
(Australia) Paul Dyas	Ford	Escort RS Cosworth	?	(Australia) Paul Dyas	(United Kingdom) Stuart Derry	10
(Italy) Paolo Persico	Ford	Sierra RS Cosworth 4x4	?	(Italy) Paolo Persico	(Italy) Marco Vialli	1
(Portugal) Rui Madeira	Ford	Sierra RS Cosworth 4x4	?	(Portugal) Rui Madeira	(Portugal) Nuno Rodrigues da Silva	2
(Germany) Josef Burkhard	Ford	Sierra RS Cosworth 4x4	?	(Germany) Josef Burkhard	(Germany) Detlef Schaller	2
(United Kingdom) Robin Boyd-Moss	Ford	Sierra RS Cosworth 4x4	?	(United Kingdom) Robin Boyd-Moss	(United Kingdom) Mark Trower	3
(Finland) Jukka Saikkonen	Ford	Sierra RS Cosworth 4x4	?	(Finland) Jukka Saikkonen	(Finland) Kari Kallio	8
(France) Hervé Malbert	Ford	Sierra RS Cosworth 4x4	?	(France) Hervé Malbert	(France) Eric Vaurin	9
Mitsubishi Ralliart Germany	Mitsubishi	Lancer Evo I	P	(Germany) Isolde Holderied	(Sweden) Christina Thörner	1–2, 4, 6
Mitsubishi Ralliart Germany	Mitsubishi	Lancer Evo II	P	(Germany) Isolde Holderied	(Sweden) Christina Thörner	8–10
Mitsubishi Ralliart Germany	Mitsubishi	Lancer Evo I	P	(Argentina) Jorge Recalde	(Argentina) Martin Christie	2, 4
Mitsubishi Ralliart Germany	Mitsubishi	Lancer Evo II	P	(Argentina) Jorge Recalde	(Argentina) Martin Christie	6–9
(Australia) Les Walkden Racing	Mitsubishi	Lancer Evo II	B	(Australia) Ed Ordynski	(Australia) Mark Stacey	7
(Japan) Kiyoshi Inoue	Mitsubishi	Lancer Evo II	?	(Japan) Kiyoshi Inoue	(Japan) Yoshimasa Nakahara	7
(New Zealand) Reece Jones	Mitsubishi	Lancer Evo I	?	(New Zealand) Reece Jones	(New Zealand) Leo Bult	7
(Japan) Hikaru Teshigawara	Mitsubishi	Lancer Evo I	?	(Japan) Hikaru Teshigawara	(Japan) Tadayoshi Sato	7
(Hong Kong) Michael Lieu	Mitsubishi	Lancer Evo I	?	(Hong Kong) Michael Lieu	(Japan) Hakaru Ichino	7
(Japan) Yoshihiro Kataoka	Mitsubishi	Lancer Evo I	?	(Japan) Yoshihiro Kataoka	(Japan) Akira Kojima	7
Mitsubishi Ralliart Finland	Mitsubishi	Lancer Evo I	M	(Finland) Jarmo Kytölehto	(Finland) Arto Kapanen	8
Mitsubishi Ralliart Finland	Mitsubishi	Lancer Evo I	M	(Finland) Olli Harkki	(Finland) Antti Virjula	8
Mitsubishi Ralliart Netherlands	Mitsubishi	Lancer Evo II	?	(Netherlands) Erwin Doctor	(Netherlands) Theo Badenberg	10
(Argentina) Gustavo Ramonda	Mitsubishi	Galant VR-4	?	(Argentina) Gustavo Ramonda	(Argentina) Horacio Berra	6
(Finland) Harri Rovanperä	Mitsubishi	Galant VR-4	?	(Finland) Harri Rovanperä	(Finland) Risto Pietiläinen	8
(Finland) Pasi Laaksomaa	Mitsubishi	Galant VR-4	?	(Finland) Pasi Laaksomaa	(Finland) Jari Salo	8
(France) Eddie Mercier	Renault	Clio Williams	M	(France) Eddie Mercier	(France) Jean-Michel Véret	1, 4
(Austria) Stefan Reininger	Renault	Clio Williams	?	(Austria) Stefan Reininger	(Austria) Robert Csösz	2, 4, 6, 10
(France) Michel Farnaud	Renault	5 GT Turbo	?	(France) Michel Farnaud	(France) Thierry Giraud	1
(Portugal) José Pereira	Toyota	Celica Turbo 4WD (ST185)	?	(Portugal) José Pereira	(Portugal) Armando Veiga	2
Toyota Castrol Finland	Toyota	Celica Turbo 4WD (ST185)	?	(Finland) Jouni Ahvenlammi	(Finland) Teppo Leino	8
Toyota Castrol Finland	Toyota	Celica Turbo 4WD (ST185)	?	(Finland) Mika Utria	(Finland) Marko Lehtinen	8
(Japan) Subaru M.S.G.	Subaru	Impreza WRX	B	(Kenya) Patrick Njiru	(Kenya) Abdul Sidi	3
(Japan) Subaru M.S.G.	Subaru	Impreza WRX	B	(United Kingdom) Richard Burns	(United Kingdom) Robert Reid	3
(Japan) Impreza IPF Fujitsubo	Subaru	Impreza WRX	?	(Japan) Mitsuo Maejima	(United Kingdom) Kevin Gormley	7
(Japan) Impreza IPF Fujitsubo	Subaru	Impreza WRX	?	(Japan) Masao Kamioka	(Australia) Iain Stewart	7, 10
(Austria) Stefan Reininger	Subaru	Legacy RS	?	(Austria) Stefan Reininger	(Austria) Robert Csösz	3
(Finland) Panu Plosila	Subaru	Legacy RS	?	(Finland) Panu Plosila	(Finland) Antti Tala	8
(Argentina) Gustavo Dechecchi	Subaru	Justy 4WD	?	(Argentina) Gustavo Dechecchi	(Argentina) Mario Ramos	6
(Kenya) Phineas Kimathi	Mazda	323 4WD	?	(Kenya) Phineas Kimathi	(Kenya) Allan Muhindi	3
(Greece) "Maverick"	Mazda	323 GTX	?	(Greece) "Maverick"	(Greece) Ioánna Takanikou	5
(Greece) Giorgos Galanakis	Mazda	323 GTX	?	(Greece) Giorgos Galanakis	(Greece) Mihalis Patrikoussis	5
(Italy) Rally Team Italia	Mazda	323 GT-R	?	(Italy) Pier Lorenzo Zanchi	(Italy) Paolo Belotti	9
(Italy) Rally Team Italia	Mazda	323 GT-R	?	(Italy) Gerolamo Pelli	(Italy) Maurizio Barone	9
(United Kingdom) Mark Tilbury	Nissan	Pulsar GTi-R	?	(United Kingdom) Mark Tilbury	(Kenya) Chris McLean	3
(Greece) Manolis Panagiotopoulos	Nissan	Sunny GTI-R	?	(Greece) Manolis Panagiotopoulos	(Greece) Nikos Panou	5
(France) Guy Fiori	BMW	325i E30	M	(France) Guy Fiori	(France) Mario Bastelica	4
(Austria) Fritz Waldherr	Audi	Coupé S2	?	(Austria) Fritz Waldherr	(Austria) Werner Jahrbacher	5
(France) Francis Leymarie	Peugeot	205 Rallye	?	(France) Francis Leymarie	(France) Patrick Vieux-Rochat	5
(Chile) Enrique Levalle	Suzuki	Swift GTi	?	(Chile) Enrique Levalle	(Chile) Patricio Isakson	6
(Argentina) Heriberto Ortiz	Suzuki	Swift GTi	?	(Argentina) Heriberto Ortiz	(Argentina) Atilio Rolandi	6
(Australia) Hyundai Rally Sport	Hyundai	Lantra	?	(Australia) Wayne Bell	(Australia) David Boddy	7
(Italy) Giacomo Trisconi	Opel	Astra GSi 16V	M	(Italy) Giacomo Trisconi	(Italy) Massimo Tarrano	9
(Malaysia) Petronas EON Racing Team	Proton	Wira 4WD	Y	(Malaysia) Karamjit Singh	(Malaysia) Ron Teoh	10

== Standing ==
=== Drivers' Championship ===
For the Drivers' Championship, points were awarded to the top 10 finishers.

Position	1st	2nd	3rd	4th	5th	6th	7th	8th	9th	10th
Points	20	15	12	10	8	6	4	3	2	1

Pos.	Driver	MON (Monaco)	POR (Portugal)	KEN (Kenya)	FRA (France)	GRE (Greece)	ARG (Argentina)	NZL (New Zealand)	FIN (Finland)	ITA (Italy)	GBR (United Kingdom)	Points
1	(France) Didier Auriol	Ret	2	3	1	Ret	1	5	2	1	6	116
2	(Spain) Carlos Sainz	3	4		2	1	2	Ret	3	2	Ret	99
3	(Finland) Juha Kankkunen	2	1	Ret	4	3	Ret	2	9	7	2	93
4	(United Kingdom) Colin McRae	10	Ret		Ret	EX	Ret	1		5	1	49
5	(Belgium) Bruno Thiry	6	Ret		6		4		Ret	4	3	44
6	(Italy) Miki Biasion	4	3		5	Ret	Ret	Ret		3	Ret	42
7	(Germany) Armin Schwarz	7				2		3		Ret		31
8	(France) François Delecour	1	Ret						4	Ret	EX	30
9	(Finland) Ari Vatanen					5	3	Ret	Ret		5	28
10	(Finland) Tommi Mäkinen		Ret						1	Ret	9	22
11	(Kenya) Ian Duncan			1								20
12	(Sweden) Kenneth Eriksson	5				Ret		4				18
13	(Japan) Kenjiro Shinozuka			2								15
14	(Italy) Andrea Aghini		Ret		3					Ret		12
15	(Kenya) Patrick Njiru			4								10
16	(Italy) Alex Fiorio		Ret			4						10
17	(Sweden) Stig Blomqvist										4	10
18	(Austria) Rudi Stohl			6			7					10
19	(Portugal) Fernando Peres		5									8
20	(United Kingdom) Richard Burns			5				Ret			Ret	8
21	(Argentina) Jorge Recalde		Ret		17		5	Ret	Ret	16		8
22	(Finland) Marcus Grönholm								5			8
23	(United Kingdom) Malcolm Wilson					6				9	Ret	8
24	(Japan) Yoshio Fujimoto			WD		7		7			Ret	8
25	(Portugal) José Carlos Macedo		6									6
26	(Argentina) Jorge Bescham						6					6
27	(New Zealand) Joe McAndrew							6				6
28	(Finland) Lasse Lampi								6			6
29	(Italy) Gianfranco Cunico				Ret					6		6
30	(Spain) Jesús Puras	9	8		12		Ret	Ret		17	15	5
31	(Austria) Raphael Sperrer		7									4
32	(Uganda) Karim Hirji			7								4
33	(France) Patrick Bernardini				7							4
34	(Sweden) Thomas Rådström								7			4
35	(United Kingdom) Gwyndaf Evans										7	4
36	(Germany) Isolde Holderied	15	11		16		8		29	15	16	3
37	(France) Jean Ragnotti	13			8							3
38	(France) Pierre-Manuel Jenot	8										3
39	(Kenya) Sammy Aslam			8								3
40	(Greece) Aris Vovos					8						3
41	(New Zealand) Brian Stokes							8				3
42	(Finland) Jarmo Kytölehto								8			3
43	(Italy) Piero Longhi									8		3
44	(South Africa) Jan Habig										8	3
45	(Czech Republic) Emil Triner		12			9			19	18	22	2
46	(Portugal) Rui Madeira		9									2
47	(Kenya) Rob Hellier			9								2
48	(France) Serge Jordan	Ret			9							2
49	(Argentina) Gabriel Raies						9					2
50	(Australia) Ed Ordynski							9				2
51	(Czech Republic) Pavel Sibera	20	10			10			18	Ret	19	2
52	(Belgium) Grégoire De Mévius		Ret			Ret			14	Ret	10	1
53	(Kenya) Azar Anwar			10								1
54	(France) Marco Massarotto				10							1
55	(Argentina) Gustavo Ramonda						10					1
56	(Japan) Kiyoshi Inoue							10				1
57	(Finland) Olli Harkki								10			1
58	(Portugal) Jorge Bica		Ret							10		1
Pos.	Driver	MON (Monaco)	POR (Portugal)	KEN (Kenya)	FRA (France)	GRE (Greece)	ARG (Argentina)	NZL (New Zealand)	FIN (Finland)	ITA (Italy)	GBR (United Kingdom)	Points

Key
Colour	Result
Gold	Winner
Silver	2nd place
Bronze	3rd place
Green	Points finish
Blue	Non-points finish
Blue	Non-classified finish (NC)
Purple	Did not finish (Ret)
Black	Excluded (EX)
Black	Disqualified (DSQ)
White	Did not start (DNS)
White	Cancelled (C)
Blank	Withdrew entry from the event (WD)

=== Manufacturers' Championship ===
Points were awarded to the top 10 finishers, but only the best placed car of each registered manufacturer obtained points.

Overall position	1st	2nd	3rd	4th	5th	6th	7th	8th	9th	10th
Points	12	10	8	7	6	5	4	3	2	1

Group position	1st	2nd	3rd	4th	5th	6th	7th	8th
Points	8	7	6	5	4	3	2	1

Pos.	Manufacturer	MON (Monaco)	POR (Portugal)	KEN (Kenya)	FRA (France)	GRE (Greece)	ARG (Argentina)	NZL (New Zealand)	FIN (Finland)	ITA (Italy)	GBR (United Kingdom)	Points
1	(Japan) Toyota	2	1	1	1	(3)	1	2	2	1	(2)	151
2	(Japan) Subaru	3	(4)	(4)	2	1	2	1	3	2	1	140
3	(United Kingdom) Ford	1	3		5	5	3	(Ret)	1	3	3	116
NC	(Japan) Mitsubishi	5				2		3		Ret		41
Pos.	Manufacturer	MON (Monaco)	POR (Portugal)	KEN (Kenya)	FRA (France)	GRE (Greece)	ARG (Argentina)	NZL (New Zealand)	FIN (Finland)	ITA (Italy)	GBR (United Kingdom)	Points

=== Group N Cup ===
Pos.	Driver	MON (Monaco)	POR (Portugal)	KEN (Kenya)	FRA (France)	GRE (Greece)	ARG (Argentina)	NZL (New Zealand)	FIN (Finland)	ITA (Italy)	GBR (United Kingdom)	Points
1	(Spain) Jesús Puras	2	1		1		Ret	Ret		3	3	50
2	(Germany) Isolde Holderied	4	3		4		3		9	1	4	42
3	(Argentina) Jorge Recalde		Ret		5		1	Ret	Ret	2		27
4	(Monaco) Pierre-Manuel Jenot	1										13
4	(Kenya) Patrick Njiru			1								13
4	(Argentina) Carlos Menem jr.		Ret		Ret	1	Ret					13
4	(Australia) Ed Ordynski							1				13
4	(Finland) Jarmo Kytölehto								1			13
4	(United Kingdom) Jonny Milner										1	13
4	(Japan) Masao Kamioka							6			2	13
11	(Portugal) Rui Madeira		2									10
11	(United Kingdom) Richard Burns			2								10
11	(France) Gabriel Padovani				2							10
11	(Greece) "Maverick"					2						10
11	(Argentina) Jorge Bescham						2					10
11	(Japan) Kiyoshi Inoue							2				10
11	(Finland) Olli Harkki								2			10
11	(Austria) Stefan Reininger		8	4	Ret		5				Ret	10
19	(Monaco) Franck Phillips	3										7
19	(United Kingdom) Mark Tilbury			3								7
19	(France) Guy Fiori				3							7
19	(Greece) Manolis Panagiotopoulos					3						7
19	(New Zealand) Reece Jones							3				7
19	(Finland) Harri Rovanperä								3			7
19	(France) Eddie Mercier	5			6							7
Pos.	Driver	MON (Monaco)	POR (Portugal)	KEN (Kenya)	FRA (France)	GRE (Greece)	ARG (Argentina)	NZL (New Zealand)	FIN (Finland)	ITA (Italy)	GBR (United Kingdom)	Points

Key
Colour	Result
Gold	Winner
Silver	2nd place
Bronze	3rd place
Green	Points finish
Blue	Non-points finish
Blue	Non-classified finish (NC)
Purple	Did not finish (Ret)
Black	Excluded (EX)
Black	Disqualified (DSQ)
White	Did not start (DNS)
White	Cancelled (C)
Blank	Withdrew entry from the event (WD)

== Results ==
Colour	Rally Surface
Gold	Gravel
Silver	Tarmac
Blue	Snow/Ice
Bronze	Mixed Surface

Round	Rally name	Podium finishers				Statistics			
Round	Rally name	Rank	Driver	Car	Time	Stages	Length	Starters	Finishers
1	(Monaco) Monte Carlo Rally (22–27 January) – Results and report	1	(France) François Delecour	Ford Escort RS Cosworth	6:12:20	22	588.43 km	186	94
1	(Monaco) Monte Carlo Rally (22–27 January) – Results and report	2	(Finland) Juha Kankkunen	Toyota Celica Turbo 4WD	6:13:25	22	588.43 km	186	94
1	(Monaco) Monte Carlo Rally (22–27 January) – Results and report	3	(Spain) Carlos Sainz	Subaru Impreza 555	6:14:07	22	588.43 km	186	94
2	Rallye de Portugal (1–4 March) – Results and report	1	(Finland) Juha Kankkunen	Toyota Celica Turbo 4WD	6:20:59	36	571,82 km	89	34
2	Rallye de Portugal (1–4 March) – Results and report	2	(France) Didier Auriol	Toyota Celica Turbo 4WD	6:21:39	36	571,82 km	89	34
2	Rallye de Portugal (1–4 March) – Results and report	3	(Italy) Miki Biasion	Ford Escort RS Cosworth	6:21:49	36	571,82 km	89	34
3	(Kenya) Safari Rally (31 March–3 April) – Results and report	1	(Kenya) Ian Duncan	Toyota Celica Turbo 4WD	20:49	¿?	2,393.10 km	43	14
3	(Kenya) Safari Rally (31 March–3 April) – Results and report	2	(Japan) Kenjiro Shinozuka	Mitsubishi Lancer Evo II	21:14	¿?	2,393.10 km	43	14
3	(Kenya) Safari Rally (31 March–3 April) – Results and report	3	(France) Didier Auriol	Toyota Celica Turbo 4WD	21:59	¿?	2,393.10 km	43	14
4	(France) Tour de Corse (5–7 May) – Results and report	1	(France) Didier Auriol	Toyota Celica Turbo 4WD	5:57:46	23	545,48 km	84	43
4	(France) Tour de Corse (5–7 May) – Results and report	2	(Spain) Carlos Sainz	Subaru Impreza 555	5:58:47	23	545,48 km	84	43
4	(France) Tour de Corse (5–7 May) – Results and report	3	(Italy) Andrea Aghini	Toyota Celica Turbo 4WD	5:59:57	23	545,48 km	84	43
5	(Greece) Acropolis Rally (29–31 May) – Results and report	1	(Spain) Carlos Sainz	Subaru Impreza 555	6:36:38	33	503,53 km	88	36
5	(Greece) Acropolis Rally (29–31 May) – Results and report	2	(Germany) Armin Schwarz	Mitsubishi Lancer Evo II	6:40:39	33	503,53 km	88	36
5	(Greece) Acropolis Rally (29–31 May) – Results and report	3	(Finland) Juha Kankkunen	Toyota Celica Turbo 4WD	6:42:31	33	503,53 km	88	36
6	Rally Argentina (30 June–2 July) – Results and report	1	(France) Didier Auriol	Toyota Celica Turbo 4WD	5:50:42	29	563,90 km	90	25
6	Rally Argentina (30 June–2 July) – Results and report	2	(Spain) Carlos Sainz	Subaru Impreza 555	5:50:48	29	563,90 km	90	25
6	Rally Argentina (30 June–2 July) – Results and report	3	(Finland) Ari Vatanen	Ford Escort RS Cosworth	5:57:22	29	563,90 km	90	25
7	Rally New Zealand (29–31 July) – Results and report	1	(United Kingdom) Colin McRae	Subaru Impreza 555	5:39:56	30	502,70 km	78	46
7	Rally New Zealand (29–31 July) – Results and report	2	(Finland) Juha Kankkunen	Toyota Celica Turbo 4WD	5:42:10	30	502,70 km	78	46
7	Rally New Zealand (29–31 July) – Results and report	3	(Germany) Armin Schwarz	Mitsubishi Lancer Evo II	5:45:27	30	502,70 km	78	46
8	(Finland) 1000 Lakes Rally (26–28 August) – Results and report	1	(Finland) Tommi Mäkinen	Ford Escort RS Cosworth	4:33:44	35	522,76 km	85	41
8	(Finland) 1000 Lakes Rally (26–28 August) – Results and report	2	(France) Didier Auriol	Toyota Celica Turbo 4WD	4:34:06	35	522,76 km	85	41
8	(Finland) 1000 Lakes Rally (26–28 August) – Results and report	3	(Spain) Carlos Sainz	Subaru Impreza 555	4:34:48	35	522,76 km	85	41
9	(Italy) Rallye Sanremo (09–12 October) – Results and report	1	(France) Didier Auriol	Toyota Celica Turbo 4WD	5:56:40	26	516,63 km	92	40
9	(Italy) Rallye Sanremo (09–12 October) – Results and report	2	(Spain) Carlos Sainz	Subaru Impreza 555	5:57:01	26	516,63 km	92	40
9	(Italy) Rallye Sanremo (09–12 October) – Results and report	3	(Italy) Miki Biasion	Ford Escort RS Cosworth	5:57:27	26	516,63 km	92	40
10	(United Kingdom) RAC Rally (20–23 November) – Results and report	1	(United Kingdom) Colin McRae	Subaru Impreza 555	5:17:25	29	520,66 km	178	97
10	(United Kingdom) RAC Rally (20–23 November) – Results and report	2	(Finland) Juha Kankkunen	Toyota Celica GT-Four ST205	5:20:58	29	520,66 km	178	97
10	(United Kingdom) RAC Rally (20–23 November) – Results and report	3	(Belgium) Bruno Thiry	Ford Escort RS Cosworth	5:27:37	29	520,66 km	178	97
