= Seppo =

Seppo (Finnish pronunciation: [ˈsepːo]) is a masculine given name of Finnish origin. It has two distinct origins; Seppo is a character in the Kalevala, whose name is derived from the Finnish word seppä, meaning smith, and the name is also a diminutive for Sebastian in Finland.

It may refer to:

== People ==
- Seppo Evwaraye (born 1982), Finnish National Football League offensive guard
- Seppo Harjanne (born 1948), Finnish WRC co-driver
- Seppo Kääriäinen (born 1948), Finnish politician
- Seppo Kolehmainen (1933–2009), Finnish film actor
- Seppo Lahtela (born 1947), Finnish farmer and politician
- Seppo Lehto (born 1962), Finnish political activist
- Seppo Pääkkönen (born 1957), Finnish actor
- Seppo Parkkila (born 1966), Finnish anatomy professor
- Seppo Räty (born 1962), Finnish javelin thrower
- Seppo Reijonen (1944–2026), Finnish ski jumper
- Seppo Ruohonen (1946–2020), Finnish opera singer
- Seppo Sairanen (born 1952), Finnish football manager and former goalkeeper
- Seppo Seluska, Swedish neo-Nazi and subject of the historical photo A Woman Hitting a Neo-Nazi With Her Handbag
- Seppo Simola (1936–2003), Finnish shotputter
- Seppo Telenius (born 1954), Finnish writer
- Seppō Gison, the Japanese surname of Chinese Zen Master Xuefeng Yicun (822–908)

== Fictional or mythological characters ==
- Seppo Ilmarinen, the smith in the Kalevala of Finnish mythology
- Seppo Taalasmaa, in the Finnish soap opera Salatut elämät

== See also ==
- Sepo (disambiguation)
