= Fabrizia Pons =

Italian rally co-driver (born 1955)

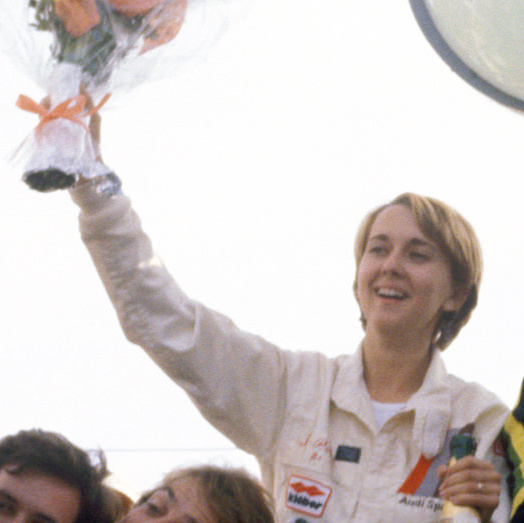
- Fabrizia Pons at the 1981 Sanremo Rallye

Personal information
- Nationality: (Italy) Italian
- Born: 26 June 1955 (age 71); Turin, Italy

World Rally Championship record
- Years active: 1976–1979, 1981–1984, 1986, 1994, 1996–1998, 2024–2025
- Driver: (Italy) Amedeo Gerbino (Italy) Franco Berruto (France) Roger Grimaud (Italy) "Lucky" (France) Michèle Mouton (Finland) Ari Vatanen (Italy) Piero Liatti (Turkey) Burcu Çetinkaya
- Rallies: 73 (Note: Pons has started 70 events as a co-driver and three as a driver.)
- Championships: 0
- Rally wins: 5
- Podiums: 17
- Stage wins: 223
- First rally: 1976 Rallye du Maroc
- First win: 1981 Rallye Sanremo
- Last win: 1997 Rally Monte Carlo
- Last rally: 2025 Rally Saudi Arabia

Fabrizia Pons (born 26 June 1955) is an Italian rally co-driver best known for her partnership with Michèle Mouton.

== Biography ==
The pair won four rallies with the first being Rallye Sanremo in 1981 and then a further three to finish second in the 1982 championship. Pons is one of two people to have achieved world championship points as a driver and co-driver, having finished ninth overall in the 1978 Sanremo Rally before switching to co-driving. Pons is a recipient of the Halda Trophy for 1982, the highest honor for a co-driver.

From 2003 to 2006, Pons was the co-driver to German Dakar Rally racer Jutta Kleinschmidt.

=== Personal life ===
Pons has two children and is from Turin.

=== WRC victories ===
Nº	Year	Rally	Driver	Car
1.	1981	(Italy) Rallye Sanremo	(France) Michèle Mouton	Audi Quattro
2.	1982	Rally de Portugal	(France) Michèle Mouton	Audi Quattro
3.	1982	(Greece) Acropolis Rally	(France) Michèle Mouton	Audi Quattro
4.	1982	Rally of Brazil	(France) Michèle Mouton	Audi Quattro
5.	1997	(Monaco) Monte Carlo Rally	(Italy) Piero Liatti	Subaru Impreza WRC

=== Complete WRC results ===
==== As co-driver ====
Year	Entrant	Car	1	2	3	4	5	6	7	8	9	10	11	12	13	14	WDC	Points
1976	Amedeo Gerbino	Opel Kadett GT/E	MON	SWE	POR	KEN	GRC	MOR ?	FIN	ITA	FRA	GBR					N/A	N/A
1977	Franco Berruto	Alfa Romeo Alfasud TI	MON; Ret	SWE	POR	KEN	NZL	GRC	FIN	CAN	ITA	FRA	GBR				N/A	N/A
1978	Franco Berruto	Alfa Romeo Alfasud TI	MON; 80	SWE	KEN	POR	GRC	FIN	CAN	ITA	CIV	FRA	GBR				N/A	N/A
1979	Roger Grimaud	Opel Kadett GT/E	MON; 98	SWE	POR	KEN	GRC	NZL	FIN	CAN	ITA	FRA					NC	0
1979	4 Rombi Corse	Fiat 131 Abarth											GBR; Ret	CIV			NC	0
1981	Audi Sport	Audi Quattro	MON	SWE	POR; 4	KEN	FRA; Ret	GRC; Ret	ARG	BRA	FIN; 13	ITA; 1	CIV	GBR; Ret			8th	30
1982	Audi Sport	Audi Quattro	MON; Ret	SWE; 5	POR; 1	KEN	FRA; 7	GRC; 1	NZL; Ret	BRA; 1	FIN; Ret	ITA; 4	CIV; Ret	GBR; 2			2nd	97
1983	Audi Sport	Audi Quattro A1	MON; Ret	SWE; 4	POR; 2	KEN; 3											5th	53
1983	Audi Sport	Audi Quattro A2					FRA; Ret	GRC; Ret	NZL; Ret	ARG; 3	FIN; 16	ITA; 7	CIV	GBR; Ret			5th	53
1984	Audi Sport	Audi Quattro A2	MON	SWE; 2	POR	KEN; Ret	FRA										12th	25
1984	Audi Sport	Audi Sport Quattro						GRC; Ret	NZL	ARG	FIN; Ret	ITA	CIV	GBR; 4			12th	25
1986	Peugeot Talbot Sport	Peugeot 205 Turbo 16 E2	MON	SWE	POR	KEN	FRA; Ret	GRE	NZL	ARG	FIN	CIV	ITA	GBR	USA		NC	0
1994	SMS AG Revo Ingenieure	Ford Escort RS Cosworth	MON	POR	KEN	FRA	GRC; 5			FIN; Ret	ITA	GBR; 5					9th	28
1994	Ford Motor Company Ltd	Ford Escort RS Cosworth						ARG; 3	NZL; Ret								9th	28
1996	Ford Motor Company Ltd	Ford Escort RS Cosworth	SWE; Ret	KEN													5th	56
1996	555 Subaru World Rally Team	Subaru Impreza 555			IDN; 2	GRC; 4	ARG; 7	FIN	AUS; 7	ITA; Ret	ESP; 2						5th	56
1997	555 Subaru World Rally Team	Subaru Impreza WRC	MON; 1	SWE	KEN	POR	ESP; 2	FRA; 5	ARG	GRC	NZL	FIN	ITA; 2	AUS	GBR; 7		6th	24
1998	555 Subaru World Rally Team	Subaru Impreza WRC	MON; 4	SWE; 9	KEN; Ret	POR; 6	ESP; Ret	FRA; 3	ARG; 6	GRC; 6	NZL; 6	FIN	ITA; 2	AUS; Ret	GBR; Ret		7th	17
2024	Toksport WRT	Škoda Fabia Rally2 evo	MON	SWE	KEN	CRO	POR	ITA	POL	LAT	FIN	GRE; 43	CHL	EUR	JPN		NC	0
2025	Burcu Çetinkaya	Renault Clio Rally3	MON	SWE	KEN	ESP	POR	ITA	GRE	EST	FIN	PAR	CHL	EUR	JPN	SAU; 43	NC	0

==== As driver ====
Year	Entrant	Car	1	2	3	4	5	6	7	8	9	10	11	12	13	14	WDC	Points
1976	Fabrizia Pons	Alfa Romeo Alfasud	MON	SWE	POR	KEN	GRC	MOR	FIN	ITA; 29	FRA	GBR					N/A	N/A
1977	Fabrizia Pons	Opel Kadett GT/E	MON	SWE	POR	KEN	NZL	GRC	FIN	CAN	ITA; Ret	FRA	GBR				N/A	N/A
1978	Conrero Squadra Corse	Opel Kadett GT/E	MON	SWE	KEN	POR	GRC	FIN	CAN	ITA; 9	CIV	FRA	GBR				N/A	N/A
