= Sepo ceramics =

Sepo people are a theoretical Mississippian culture of the late Woodland period around 1000 BCE, present in Mississippian culture pottery of the Dickson Mounds. Sepo occupations are confined to the Illinois River Valley between Anderson Lake in southern Fulton County, Illinois and Peoria Lake, including Sepo, Illinois an unincorporated community.
