= Seppo Parkkila =

Finnish anatomist

Seppo Parkkila (born 1966) is a professor of anatomy at the University of Tampere, Finland. He graduated from the University of Oulu in 1991 (M.D.) and obtained his PhD from the same university in 1994. In 1996-1998 he worked as a visiting researcher at Saint Louis University. In 2002 he moved to the University of Tampere where he started to work as a professor of medical technology and biotechnology and later in 2008 he was appointed to the post of professor in anatomy. Between 2016 and 2018, he served as vice-rector of research at the university. His research work has been focused on pH-regulation, carbonic anhydrases and regulation of iron homeostasis.
