= Sepo, Illinois =

- Unincorporated community
- Location within Illinois Location within the United States
- Coordinates: 40°20′37″N 90°07′09″W
- Country: United States
- State: Illinois
- County: Fulton
- Elevation: 455 ft (139 m)
- Time zone: UTC-6 (Central (CST))
  - Summer (DST): UTC-5 (CDT)
- Area code: 309
- GNIS feature ID: 423176

Sepo is an unincorporated community in Fulton County, Illinois, United States. Sepo is southeast of Lewistown. The name has been given to the Sepo ceramics culture c. 1000 BCE.
