= Patrick Njiru =

Kenyan rally driver (born 1957)

Patrick Njirū
Personal information
- Nationality: (Kenya) Kenyan
- Born: 12 July 1957 (age 69); Kevote, Kenya

World Rally Championship record
- Years active: 1984–1994, 1996–1998
- Co-driver: (Kenya) Dave Macharia (Kenya) Chris Davey (Kenya) Gavin Bennett (Kenya) Rick Mathews (Kenya) Aslam Khan (Kenya) David Williamson (Kenya) Bob Khan (Australia) Chris Shearer (Kenya) Ian Munro (Kenya) Abdul Sidi (United Kingdom) Gillian Webb
- Teams: Subaru
- Rallies: 15
- Championships: 0
- Rally wins: 0
- Podiums: 0
- Total points: 18
- First rally: 1984 Safari Rally
- Last rally: 1998 Safari Rally

Patrick Njirū (born 12 July 1957) is a former Kenyan rally driver with Subaru World Rally Team from 1983 to 2002. He hails from Kevote area of Manyatta constituency, Embu County. He attended St Paul's Kevote Boys' Secondary School. He started participating in rally championships after returning from Japan where he studied for three years.

He has retired from competitive racing but often takes part in organizing and competing in charity races like the November 2011 Race4Change in Kenya.
