= Rui Madeira =

Portuguese rally driver (born 1969)

Personal information
- Nationality: (Portugal) Portuguese
- Born: 1 March 1969 (age 57); Almada, Portugal

World Rally Championship record
- Years active: 1992–2001, 2007, 2014
- Co-driver: (Portugal) Nuno Rodrigues da Silva (Portugal) Fernando Prata
- Teams: Mitsubishi, Grifone, Subaru Allstars, Procar Rally Team, SEAT, Ford Galp Racing
- Rallies: 28
- Championships: 0
- Rally wins: 0
- Podiums: 0
- Stage wins: 4
- Total points: 17
- First rally: 1992 Rally de Portugal
- Last rally: 2014 Rally de Portugal

Rui Adelino Pinto Madeira (born 1 March 1969 in Almada) is a Portuguese former rally driver. He was the first Portuguese rally driver to win an FIA rally title, when he won the Group N class of WRC in 1995.

== Career ==
Madeira started rallying in 1990, taking part in the SEAT Marbella Trophy, held inside the Portuguese Rally Championship for Beginners. Madeira graduated to the main Portuguese Rally Championship in 1992, where he won the Citroën AX Trophy.

In 1993, Madeira purchased the ex-Fernando Peres Group N Ford Sierra RS Cosworth, winning the Group N national title, which he repeated the following year in a Mitsubishi Lancer Evolution.

In 1995, Madeira started an international career, taking part in the seven rounds of the World Rally Championship. Madeira took four class wins on his way to the title in the FIA Cup for Drivers in Production Cars. In the following years, he participated in several WRC events as a privateer, usually in Toyota or Subaru cars, winning the 1996 Rally of Portugal.

Madeira returned to the Portuguese national championship in 2000, as a works driver driving a SEAT Cordoba WRC. In 2001 and 2002, he switched to a works Ford Focus WRC, retiring at the end of the season, making sporadic appearances afterwards.

Madeira currently works as an architect for his family's construction company, Construciv.
