= Seppo Harjanne =

Finnish rally co-driver (born 1948)

Personal information
- Nationality: (Finland) Finnish
- Born: February 20, 1948 (age 78); Helsinki, Finland

World Rally Championship record
- Years active: 1974–1977, 1979–1997
- Driver: (Finland) Timo Salonen (Finland) Erkki Pitkänen (Finland) Tapio Vanhala (Finland) Matti Johansson (Finland) Pentti Airikkala (Finland) Hannu Mikkola (Finland) Tomi Palmqvist (Finland) Pekka Rantakari (Finland) Sebastian Lindholm (Finland) Tommi Mäkinen
- Teams: Datsun, Nissan, Peugeot, Mazda, Mitsubishi
- Rallies: 128
- Co-championships: 3 (1985, 1996, 1997)
- Rally wins: 20
- Podiums: 45
- Stage wins: 397
- First rally: 1974 1000 Lakes Rally
- First win: 1980 Rally New Zealand
- Last win: 1997 Rally Finland
- Last rally: 1997 Wales Rally GB

Seppo Harjanne (born 20 February 1948) is a Finnish former rally co-driver. He is best known for co-driving for Timo Salonen from 1979 to 1988 and for Tommi Mäkinen from 1990 to 1997. With Salonen, Harjanne took ten World Rally Championship victories for the factory teams of Datsun, Peugeot and Mazda, and the 1985 drivers' world championship title in a Peugeot 205 Turbo 16 E2. With Mäkinen, competing mainly for the Team Mitsubishi Ralliart, he won ten more WRC events along with the 1996 and 1997 drivers' titles in a Lancer Evolution.

Harjanne retired after the 1997 season and Mäkinen went on to take two more titles with Risto Mannisenmäki. At the time of his retirement, Harjanne held the co-driver records for most wins and most titles (tied with Juha Piironen) in the WRC. His record for most wins has since been surpassed by Luís Moya, Nicky Grist, Daniel Elena and Timo Rautiainen, and his record for most titles by Elena.

Since 2000, Harjanne has worked as a Deputy Clerk of the Course of Rally Finland and assisted in organising several other international rallies.
