= Ian Duncan (rally driver) =

Kenyan rally driver (born 1961)

Personal information
- Nationality: (Kenya) Kenyan
- Born: 23 June 1961 (age 65)

World Rally Championship record
- Years active: 1983–1999
- Co-driver: (Kenya) Saleem Haji (Kenya) Gavin Bennett (Kenya) Ian Munro (Kenya) Yvonne Mehta (Kenya) David Williamson
- Teams: Subaru, Toyota
- Rallies: 15
- Championships: 0
- Rally wins: 1
- Podiums: 4
- Stage wins: 4
- Total points: 80
- First rally: 1983 Safari Rally
- First win: 1994 Safari Rally
- Last rally: 1999 Safari Rally

Ian Duncan (born 23 June 1961) is a rally driver of Kenya. He was Kenyan Rally Champion six times (1987, 1988, 1989, 1991, 2000 and 2011), and achieved outright victory in a World Rally Championship round when he won the 42nd Trustbank Safari Rally in 1994. This was one of seven consecutive top ten finishes in the event from 1990 to 1996, despite its notorious attrition rate.

== Career ==
He spent his childhood at his parents' farm in Limuru. His first tastes of driving occurred when he was aged around ten, as he helped his mother when she got stuck on farm roads during the rainy season. He went to St. Mary's High School, but was more interested in repairing cars and motorcycles. He also competed in motocross winning the national 125 cc title in 1979 and 1980. He competed in the Safari Rally for the first time in 1983 driving a Nissan pick-up navigated by Gavin Bennett, reaching ninth position and a class victory, gaining the attention of rally people.

His first victorious national rally was the Nakuru Rally in 1987 driving a Toyota Celica twin-cam turbo navigated by Ian Munro. Duncan won his first national championship the same year winning most of the races. He won the 1987 national Motor Sportsman of the Year Award.

Having competed with a Group A Subaru Legacy RS and Toyota Celica Turbo 4WD in the 1990s. Apart from the Safari Rally, he competed in WRC rallies only a few times. The best result was finishing 3rd overall during the 1993 WRC safari Rally. During this edition, Toyota achieved a famous 1-2-3-4 that was repeated during the 2022 WRC Safari Rally. He would also finish eighth overall and win the Group N class in a Subaru Legacy RS at the 1990 Acropolis Rally in Greece, navigated by Yvonne Mehta (the wife of Shekhar Mehta).

Later he was running a non-homologated Toyota Hilux with a turbocharged 4.5 L engine in the Kenyan National Rally Championship (KNRC). In November 2006 Duncan won the Guru Nanak Rally, becoming the first driver to win a KNRC round for the tenth time. He was imposed a four percent time penalty due to his non-homologated vehicle. He extended the record in 2007 by winning the Guru Nanak Rally again.

Duncan has won the Rhino Charge off-road event in 1998, 2006 and 2007. He has competed in motorcycling. In 2003, he was the runner up of the Kenyan enduro, motocross as well as rally championships.

He introduced his newest rally car, a Nissan Patrol pick-up, in October 2008. In 2008 he also won the national autocross championship. In 2009, 15 years after winning the Safari Rally proper, Duncan won the Safari classic rally driving a 1968 Ford Mustang navigated by his current navigator Amaar Slatch. The defending champion Björn Waldegård was left in second place.

On 23 October 2011 he won the Kenyan National Rally Championship for the sixth time. Duncan entered the 2011 Classic Safari Rally as a defending champion, now driving a Ford Capri. He finished seventh In 2012 he came close to winning his second Safari Rally, now with ARC status, but lost to Carl Tundo by just 15 seconds

== WRC victories ==
#	Event	Season	Co-driver	Car
1	(Kenya) 42nd Trustbank Safari Rally	1994	David Williamson	Toyota Celica Turbo 4WD
