= 1993 Monte Carlo Rally =

Rallying motorsport event

1993 Monte Carlo Rally 61ème Rallye Automobile de Monte-Carlo
Round 1 of the 1993 World Rally Championship
Next event →
- Host country: Monaco
- Dates run: 21 – 27 January 1994
- Stages: 22
- Stage surface: Asphalt/Snow
- Overall distance: 593.62 km (368.86 miles)

Statistics
- Crews: 170 at start, 86 at finish

Overall results
- Overall winner: (France) Didier Auriol; Toyota Celica Turbo 4WD (ST185); 6:13:43

The 1993 Monte Carlo Rally was the 61st Rallye Automobile de Monte-Carlo. It was won by Didier Auriol.

It was part of the 1993 World Rally Championship.

== Results ==
Pos.	No.	Driver	Car	Time/Retired	Pts.
1	3	(France) Didier Auriol	Toyota Celica Turbo 4WD (ST185)	6:13:43	20
2	6	(France) François Delecour	Ford Escort RS Cosworth	6:13:58	15
3	2	(Italy) Massimo Biasion	Ford Escort RS Cosworth	6:16:59	12
4	8	(Sweden) Kenneth Eriksson	Mitsubishi Lancer Evo I	6:31:30	10
5	7	(Finland) Juha Kankkunen	Toyota Celica Turbo 4WD (ST185)	6:32:43	8
6	4	(Germany) Armin Schwarz	Mitsubishi Lancer Evo I	6:39:45	6
7	15	(Switzerland) Olivier Burri	Ford Sierra Cosworth 4x4	6:51:03	4
8	10	(Belgium) Bruno Thiry	Opel Astra	6:54:08	3
9	16	(Monaco) Christophe Spiliotis	Lancia Delta HF Integrale	6:56:24	2
10	29	(France) Jean-Baptiste Serpaggi	Ford Escort RS Cosworth	6:57:58	1
