= 1994 Monte Carlo Rally =

Rallying motorsport event

1994 Monte Carlo Rally 62ème Rallye Automobile de Monte-Carlo
Round 1 of the 1994 World Rally Championship
Next event →
- Host country: Monaco
- Dates run: 22 – 27 January 1994
- Stages: 22
- Stage surface: Asphalt/Snow
- Overall distance: 588.43 km (365.63 miles)

Statistics
- Crews: 186 at start, 94 at finish

Overall results
- Overall winner: (France) François Delecour; Ford Escort RS Cosworth; 6:12:20

The 1994 Monte Carlo Rally was the 62nd Rallye Automobile de Monte-Carlo. It was won by François Delecour.

It was part of the 1994 World Rally Championship.

== Results ==
| Pos. | No. | Driver | Car | Time/Retired | Pts. |
|---|---|---|---|---|---|
| 1 | 6 | (France) François Delecour | Ford Escort RS Cosworth | 6:12:20 | 20 |
| 2 | 1 | (Finland) Juha Kankkunen | Toyota Celica Turbo 4WD (ST185) | 6:13:25 | 15 |
| 3 | 2 | (Spain) Carlos Sainz | Subaru Impreza 555 | 6:14:07 | 12 |
| 4 | 4 | (Italy) Massimo Biasion | Ford Escort RS Cosworth | 6:16:56 | 10 |
| 5 | 9 | (Sweden) Kenneth Eriksson | Mitsubishi Lancer Evo I | 6:19:17 | 8 |
| 6 | 8 | (Belgium) Bruno Thiry | Ford Escort RS Cosworth | 6:19:18 | 6 |
| 7 | 5 | (Germany) Armin Schwarz | Mitsubishi Lancer Evo I | 6:29:19 | 4 |
| 8 | 19 | (France) Pierre-Manuel Jenot | Ford Escort RS Cosworth | 6:49:16 | 3 |
| 9 | 23 | (Spain) Jesús Puras | Ford Escort RS Cosworth | 6:54:49 | 2 |
| 10 | 7 | (Scotland) Colin McRae | Subaru Impreza 555 | 7:01:30 | 1 |
