= Jarmo Kytölehto =

Finnish rally driver (born 1961)

Personal information
- Nationality: (Finland) Finnish
- Born: June 23, 1961 (age 65)

World Rally Championship record
- Years active: 1990–1999
- Co-driver: (Finland) Kari Jokinen (Finland) Arto Kapanen (Finland) Voitto Silander
- Teams: Mitsubishi, Nissan, Subaru, Vauxhall
- Rallies: 23
- Podiums: 2
- First rally: 40th 1000 Lakes Rally, 1990
- Last rally: 55th Network Q Rally of Great Britain, 1999

Jarmo Kytölehto (born 23 June 1961) is a Finnish former rally driver from Petäjävesi. He won the Finnish Rally Championship for three consecutive years, first in Group A (1990, 1991) and then in Group N (1992). He also competed in 23 events in the World Rally Championship, with his best results coming in his home event at Rally Finland where he had three consecutive podium finishes in 1995, 1996 and 1997. He competed in the British Rally Championship from 1995 until 2000, driving for several Formula 2 teams, including Vauxhall, Ford and Hyundai.

Sporting positions
Preceded by Flavio Alonso	Race of Champions; Rally Master; 1997	Succeeded by Alister McRae
