= Toyota World Rally Championship results =

Toyota results in the World Rally Championship

The table below shows all results of Toyota Motorsport GmbH and Toyota Gazoo Racing WRT in World Rally Championship. To date, Toyota had won 117 WRC races.

== WRC Results (Group A era) ==
| Year | Entrant | Car | No | Driver | 1 | 2 | 3 | 4 | 5 | 6 | 7 | 8 | 9 | 10 | 11 | 12 | 13 | 14 | WDC | Points | WMC | Points |
|---|---|---|---|---|---|---|---|---|---|---|---|---|---|---|---|---|---|---|---|---|---|---|
| 1987 | Toyota Team Europe | Toyota Supra 3.0i | | (Sweden) Björn Waldegård | MON | SWE | POR | KEN; Ret | FRA | GRE | USA; 6 | NZL | ARG | FIN | | | | | 36th | 6 | 7th | 22 |
| 1987 | Toyota Team Europe | Toyota Supra Turbo | | (Sweden) Björn Waldegård | | | | | | | | | | | CIV; Ret | ITA | GBR | | 36th | 6 | 7th | 22 |
| 1987 | Toyota Team Europe | Toyota Supra 3.0i | | (Sweden) Lars-Erik Torph | MON | SWE | POR | KEN; 3 | FRA | GRE | USA; Ret | NZL | ARG | FIN | | | | | 23rd | 12 | 7th | 22 |
| 1987 | Toyota Team Europe | Toyota Supra Turbo | | (Sweden) Lars-Erik Torph | | | | | | | | | | | CIV; Ret | ITA | GBR | | 23rd | 12 | 7th | 22 |
| 1987 | Toyota Team Europe | Toyota Supra 3.0i | | (Kenya) Robin Ulyate | MON | SWE | POR | KEN; 6 | FRA | GRE | USA | NZL | ARG | FIN | CIV; Ret | ITA | GBR | | 36th | 6 | 7th | 22 |
| 1988 | Toyota Team Europe | Toyota Supra Turbo | | (Sweden) Kenneth Eriksson | MON | SWE | POR | KEN; 4 | | | | | | | | | | | 12th | 22 | 5th | 46 |
| 1988 | Toyota Team Europe | Toyota Celica GT-Four ST165 | | (Sweden) Kenneth Eriksson | | | | | FRA; 6 | GRE | USA | NZL | ARG | FIN; Ret | CIV | ITA; 6 | | | 12th | 22 | 5th | 46 |
| 1988 | Toyota Team Great Britain | Toyota Celica GT-Four ST165 | | (Sweden) Kenneth Eriksson | | | | | | | | | | | | | GBR; Ret | | 12th | 22 | 5th | 46 |
| 1988 | Toyota Team Europe | Toyota Supra Turbo | | (Finland) Juha Kankkunen | MON | SWE | POR | KEN; 5 | | | | | | | | | | | 37th | 8 | 5th | 46 |
| 1988 | Toyota Team Europe | Toyota Celica GT-Four ST165 | | (Finland) Juha Kankkunen | | | | | FRA; Ret | GRE; Ret | USA | NZL | ARG | FIN; Ret | CIV | ITA; Ret | | | 37th | 8 | 5th | 46 |
| 1988 | Toyota Team Great Britain | Toyota Celica GT-Four ST165 | | (Finland) Juha Kankkunen | | | | | | | | | | | | | GBR; Ret | | 37th | 8 | 5th | 46 |
| 1988 | Toyota Team Europe | Toyota Supra Turbo | | (Sweden) Björn Waldegård | MON | SWE | POR | KEN; 7 | | | | | | | | | | | 17th | 16 | 5th | 46 |
| 1988 | Toyota Team Europe | Toyota Celica GT-Four ST165 | | (Sweden) Björn Waldegård | | | | | FRA | GRE; Ret | USA | NZL | ARG | FIN | CIV | ITA | | | 17th | 16 | 5th | 46 |
| 1988 | Toyota Team Great Britain | Toyota Celica GT-Four ST165 | | (Sweden) Björn Waldegård | | | | | | | | | | | | | GBR; 3 | | 17th | 16 | 5th | 46 |
| 1988 | Toyota Team Great Britain | Toyota Celica GT-Four ST165 | | (United Kingdom) Jimmy McRae | | | | | | | | | | | | | GBR; Ret | | - | 0 | 5th | 46 |
| 1989 | Toyota Team Sweden | Toyota Celica GT-Four ST165 | | (Sweden) Leif Asterhag | SWE; 7 | MON | POR | KEN | FRA | GRC | NZL | ARG | FIN | AUS | ITA | CIV | GBR | | 52nd | 4 | 2nd | 101 |
| 1989 | Toyota Team Sweden | Toyota Celica GT-Four ST165 | | (Sweden) Kenneth Eriksson | SWE; 3 | MON | POR | KEN | FRA | | | | | | | | | | 6th | 47 | 2nd | 101 |
| 1989 | Toyota Team Europe | Toyota Celica GT-Four ST165 | | (Sweden) Kenneth Eriksson | | | | | | GRC; Ret | NZL | ARG | FIN; 4 | AUS; 2 | ITA | CIV | GBR; 4 | | 6th | 47 | 2nd | 101 |
| 1989 | Toyota Team Europe | Toyota Celica GT-Four ST165 | | (Finland) Juha Kankkunen | SWE | MON; 5 | POR; Ret | KEN | FRA; 3 | GRC; Ret | NZL | ARG | FIN; Ret | AUS; 1 | ITA; 5 | CIV | GBR; 3 | | 3rd | 60 | 2nd | 101 |
| 1989 | Toyota Team Europe | Toyota Celica GT-Four ST165 | | (Spain) Carlos Sainz | SWE | MON; Ret | POR; Ret | KEN | FRA; Ret | GRC; Ret | NZL | ARG | FIN; 3 | AUS | ITA; 3 | CIV | GBR; 2 | | 8th | 39 | 2nd | 101 |
| 1989 | Toyota Team Europe | Toyota Celica GT-Four ST165 | | (Sweden) Björn Waldegård | SWE | MON; Ret | POR; Ret | | | | | | | | | | | | 29th | 10 | 2nd | 101 |
| 1989 | Toyota Team Kenya | Toyota Supra Turbo | | (Sweden) Björn Waldegård | | | | KEN; 4 | FRA | GRC | NZL | ARG | FIN | AUS | ITA | CIV | GBR | | 29th | 10 | 2nd | 101 |
| 1989 | Toyota Team Kenya | Toyota Supra Turbo | | (Kenya) Ian Duncan | SWE | MON | POR | KEN; 5 | FRA | GRC | NZL | ARG | FIN | AUS | ITA | CIV | GBR | | 34th | 8 | 2nd | 101 |
| 1990 | Toyota Team Europe | Toyota Celica GT-Four ST165 | | (Spain) Carlos Sainz | MON; 2 | POR; Ret | KEN; 4 | FRA; 2 | GRE; 1 | NZL; 1 | ARG; 2 | FIN; 1 | AUS; 2 | ITA; 3 | CIV | GBR; 1 | | | 1st | 162 | 2nd | 131 |
| 1990 | Toyota Team Europe | Toyota Celica GT-Four ST165 | | (Sweden) Mikael Ericsson | MON; 7 | POR | KEN; 3 | FRA | GRE; 4 | NZL | ARG | FIN; Ret | AUS; Ret | ITA; 6 | CIV | GBR | | | 5th | 32 | 2nd | 131 |
| 1990 | Toyota Team Europe | Toyota Celica GT-Four ST165 | | (Germany) Armin Schwarz | MON; 5 | POR; Ret | KEN | FRA; Ret | GRE | NZL | ARG | FIN | AUS | ITA; Ret | CIV | GBR; 7 | | | 19th | 12 | 2nd | 131 |
| 1990 | Toyota Team Kenya | Toyota Celica GT-Four ST165 | | (Sweden) Björn Waldegård | MON | POR | KEN; 1 | FRA | GRE | NZL | ARG | FIN | AUS | ITA | CIV | GBR | | | 12th | 20 | 2nd | 131 |
| 1990 | Toyota Team Sweden | Toyota Celica GT-Four ST165 | | (Sweden) Mats Jonsson | MON | POR | KEN | FRA | GRE | NZL | ARG | FIN | AUS | ITA | CIV | GBR; 4 | | | 20th | 10 | 2nd | 131 |
| 1990 | Toyota Team Great Britain | Toyota Celica GT-Four ST165 | | (United Kingdom) David Llwellin | MON | POR | KEN | FRA | GRE | NZL | ARG | FIN | AUS | ITA | CIV | GBR; 8 | | | 47th | 3 | 2nd | 131 |
| 1991 | Toyota Team Europe | Toyota Celica GT-Four ST165 | | (Spain) Carlos Sainz | MON; 1 | SWE | POR; 1 | KEN; Ret | FRA; 1 | GRE; 2 | NZL; 1 | ARG; 1 | FIN; 4 | AUS; Ret | ITA; 6 | CIV | ESP; Ret | GBR; 3 | 2nd | 143 | 2nd | 128 |
| 1991 | Toyota Team Europe | Toyota Celica GT-Four ST165 | | (Germany) Armin Schwarz | MON; 4 | SWE | POR; Ret | KEN | FRA; Ret | GRE; 5 | NZL | ARG | FIN; 9 | AUS; 3 | ITA; 8 | CIV | ESP; 1 | GBR | 6th | 55 | 2nd | 128 |
| 1992 | Toyota Team Europe | Toyota Celica Turbo 4WD ST185 | | (Spain) Carlos Sainz | MON; 2 | SWE | POR; 3 | KEN; 1 | FRA; 4 | GRE; Ret | NZL; 1 | ARG; 2 | FIN | AUS; 3 | ITA | CIV | ESP; 1 | GBR; 1 | 1st | 144 | 2nd | 116 |
| 1992 | Toyota Team Europe | Toyota Celica Turbo 4WD ST185 | | (Germany) Armin Schwarz | MON; Ret | SWE | POR; Ret | KEN | FRA; 5 | GRE; Ret | NZL | ARG | FIN | AUS | ITA | CIV | ESP; 5 | GBR | 19th | 16 | 2nd | 116 |
| 1992 | Toyota Team Europe | Toyota Celica Turbo 4WD ST185 | | (Finland) Markku Alén | MON; Ret | SWE; 4 | POR; 4 | KEN; 5 | FRA | GRE; Ret | NZL | ARG | FIN; 3 | AUS | ITA | CIV | ESP | GBR; 4 | 5th | 50 | 2nd | 116 |
| 1993 | Toyota Castrol Team | Toyota Celica Turbo 4WD ST185 | | (France) Didier Auriol | MON; 1 | SWE; Ret | POR | KEN | FRA; 2 | GRC; Ret | ARG; 3 | NZL; 3 | FIN; 3 | AUS; Ret | ITA | ESP; 2 | GBR; 6 | | 3rd | 92 | 1st | 157 |
| 1993 | Toyota Castrol Team | Toyota Celica Turbo 4WD ST185 | | (Finland) Juha Kankkunen | MON; 5 | SWE; 2 | POR | KEN; 1 | FRA | GRC; Ret | ARG; 1 | NZL; 5 | FIN; 1 | AUS; 1 | ITA | ESP; 3 | GBR; 1 | | 1st | 143 | 1st | 157 |
| 1994 | Toyota Castrol Team | Toyota Celica Turbo 4WD ST185 | | (Finland) Juha Kankkunen | MON; 2 | POR; 1 | KEN; Ret | FRA; 4 | GRC; 3 | ARG; Ret | NZL; 2 | FIN; 9 | ITA; 7 | GBR; 2 | | | | | 3rd | 93 | 1st | 151 |
| 1994 | Toyota Castrol Team | Toyota Celica Turbo 4WD ST185 | | (France) Didier Auriol | MON; Ret | POR; 2 | KEN; 3 | FRA; 1 | GRC; Ret | ARG; 1 | NZL; 5 | FIN; 2 | ITA; 1 | GBR; 6 | | | | | 1st | 116 | 1st | 151 |
| 1995 | Toyota Castrol Team | Toyota Celica Turbo ST205 | 1 | (France) Didier Auriol | MON; Ret | SWE; 5 | POR; 5 | FRA; 1 | NZL; 2 | AUS; Ret | ESP; DSQ | GBR | | | | | | | DSQ | 51 | EX | 260 |
| 1995 | Toyota Castrol Team | Toyota Celica Turbo ST205 | 2 | (Finland) Juha Kankkunen | MON; 3 | SWE; 4 | POR; 2 | FRA; 10 | NZL; 3 | AUS; 3 | ESP; Ret | GBR | | | | | | | DSQ | 62 | EX | 260 |
| 1995 | Toyota Castrol Team | Toyota Celica Turbo ST205 | 3 | (Germany) Armin Schwarz | MON; Ret | SWE; 9 | POR; 4 | FRA; Ret | NZL; 4 | AUS; 5 | ESP; Ret | GBR | | | | | | | DSQ | 30 | EX | 260 |

== WRC Results (WRC era) ==
| Year | Entrant | Car | No | Driver | 1 | 2 | 3 | 4 | 5 | 6 | 7 | 8 | 9 | 10 | 11 | 12 | 13 | 14 | WDC | Points | WMC | Points |
|---|---|---|---|---|---|---|---|---|---|---|---|---|---|---|---|---|---|---|---|---|---|---|
| 1997 | Toyota Castrol Team | Toyota Corolla WRC | 7 | (France) Didier Auriol | MON | SWE | KEN | POR | ESP | FRA | ARG | GRE | NZL | FIN; 8 | IDN; Ret | ITA; 8 | AUS; 3 | GBR; Ret | 11th | 6 | - | - |
| 1997 | Toyota Castrol Team | Toyota Corolla WRC | 9/8 | (Australia) Neal Bates | MON | SWE | KEN | POR | ESP | FRA | ARG | GRE | NZL | FIN | IDN; Ret | ITA | AUS; 8 | GBR | 27th | 1 | - | - |
| 1997 | Toyota Castrol Team | Toyota Corolla WRC | 8/9 | (Finland) Marcus Grönholm | MON | SWE | KEN | POR | ESP | FRA | ARG | GRE | NZL | FIN; Ret | IDN | ITA | AUS | GBR; 5 | 12th | 5 | - | - |
| 1997 | Toyota Castrol Team | Toyota Corolla WRC | 10 | (Belgium) Freddy Loix | MON | SWE | KEN | POR | ESP | FRA | ARG | GRE | NZL | FIN | IDN | ITA; 5 | AUS | GBR | 9th | 8 | - | - |
| 1998 | Toyota Castrol Team | Toyota Corolla WRC | 5 | (Spain) Carlos Sainz | MON; 1 | SWE; 2 | KEN; Ret | POR; 2 | ESP; 7 | FRA; 8 | ARG; 2 | GRC; 4 | NZL; 1 | FIN; 2 | ITA; 4 | AUS; 2 | GBR; Ret | | 2nd | 56 | 2nd | 85 |
| 1998 | Toyota Castrol Team | Toyota Corolla WRC | 6 | (France) Didier Auriol | MON; 14 | | KEN; 4 | POR; Ret | | FRA; 6 | ARG; Ret | GRC; 2 | NZL; 2 | FIN; 4 | ITA; Ret | AUS; 3 | GBR; Ret | | 5th | 34 | 2nd | 85 |
| 1998 | Toyota Castrol Team | Toyota Corolla WRC | 6 | (Sweden) Thomas Rådström | | SWE; Ret | | | | | | | | | | | | | 19th | 1 | 2nd | 85 |
| 1998 | Toyota Castrol Team | Toyota Corolla WRC | 6 | (Belgium) Freddy Loix | | | | | ESP; 2 | | | | | | | | | | 8th | 13 | 2nd | 85 |
| 1998 | Toyota Castrol Team | Toyota Corolla WRC | 9 | (France) Didier Auriol | | SWE; 6 | | | ESP; 1 | | | | | | | | | | 5th | 34 | 2nd | 85 |
| 1998 | Toyota Castrol Team | Toyota Corolla WRC | - | (Finland) Marcus Grönholm | MON | SWE | KEN | POR | ESP | FRA | ARG | GRC | NZL | FIN; 7 | ITA | AUS | GBR; Ret | | 16th | 2 | 2nd | 85 |
| 1998 | Marlboro Toyota Castrol Belgium | Toyota Corolla WRC | - | (Belgium) Freddy Loix | MON | SWE | KEN | POR; 3 | ESP | FRA | ARG | GRC; 5 | NZL | FIN | ITA | AUS; 6 | GBR | | 8th | 13 | - | - |
| 1998 | Toyota Castrol Team Denmark | Toyota Corolla WRC | 27 | (Denmark) Henrik Lundgaard | MON | SWE | KEN | POR | ESP | FRA | ARG | GRC | NZL | FIN | ITA | AUS | GBR; Ret | | - | 0 | - | - |
| 1998 | Toyota Castrol Team Sweden | Toyota Corolla WRC | - | (Sweden) Thomas Rådström | MON | SWE; Ret | KEN | POR; Ret | ESP; 12 | FRA | ARG | GRC; Ret | NZL; 7 | FIN; 6 | ITA | AUS | GBR | | 19th | 1 | - | - |
| 1998 | Toyota Castrol Team Sweden | Toyota Corolla WRC | 12 | (Australia) Neal Bates | MON | SWE | KEN | POR | ESP | FRA | ARG | GRC | NZL | FIN | ITA | AUS; 12 | GBR | | - | 0 | - | - |
| 1999 | Toyota Castrol Team | Toyota Corolla WRC | 3 | (Spain) Carlos Sainz | MON; Ret | SWE; 2 | KEN; 3 | POR; 2 | ESP; Ret | FRA; 3 | ARG; 5 | GRC; 2 | NZL; 6 | FIN; 3 | CHN; 3 | ITA; Ret | AUS; 2 | GBR; Ret | 5th | 44 | 1st | 109 |
| 1999 | Toyota Castrol Team | Toyota Corolla WRC | 4 | (France) Didier Auriol | MON; 3 | SWE; 4 | KEN; 2 | POR; 3 | ESP; 2 | FRA; 5 | ARG; 3 | GRC; Ret | NZL; 4 | FIN; Ret | CHN; 1 | ITA; 3 | AUS; Ret | GBR; Ret | 3rd | 52 | 1st | 109 |
| 1999 | Toyota Castrol Team | Toyota Corolla WRC | 20 | (Germany) Isolde Holderied | MON; 13 | SWE | KEN | POR | ESP | FRA | ARG | GRC | NZL | FIN | CHN | ITA | AUS | GBR | - | 0 | 1st | 109 |
| 1999 | Toyota Castrol Team | Toyota Corolla WRC | 45 | (United Kingdom) Martin Brundle | MON | SWE | KEN | POR | ESP | FRA | ARG | GRC | NZL | FIN | CHN | ITA | AUS | GBR; Ret | - | 0 | 1st | 109 |
| 1999 | Henrik Lundgaard | Toyota Corolla WRC | - | (Denmark) Henrik Lundgaard | MON; 9 | SWE | KEN | POR | ESP; Ret | FRA; 11 | ARG | GRC | NZL | FIN | CHN | ITA; 11 | AUS | GBR | - | 0 | - | - |
| 1999 | Toyota Kenya | Toyota Corolla WRC | 12 | (Kenya) Ian Duncan | MON | SWE | KEN; 4 | POR | ESP | FRA | ARG | GRC | NZL | FIN | CHN | ITA | AUS | GBR | 17th | 3 | - | - |
| 1999 | Toyota Castrol Deutschland | Toyota Corolla WRC | - | (Germany) Matthias Kahle | MON | SWE | KEN | POR; 8 | | | | GRC; Ret | NZL; 7 | FIN | CHN | | | GBR; 10 | - | 0 | - | - |
| 1999 | Toyota Castrol Deutschland | Toyota Corolla WRC | - | (Germany) Isolde Holderied | | | | | ESP; 19 | FRA; 23 | ARG | | | | | ITA; 28 | AUS | | - | 0 | - | - |
| 1999 | Toyota Team Australia | Toyota Corolla WRC | 18 | (Australia) Neal Bates | MON | SWE | KEN | POR | ESP | FRA | ARG | GRC | NZL | FIN | CHN | ITA | AUS; Ret | GBR | - | 0 | - | - |
2000 – 2016: Toyota did not compete as manufacturer entry
| 2017 | Toyota Gazoo Racing WRT | Toyota Yaris WRC | | | | | | | | | | | | | | | | | | | | |
| 2017 | Toyota Gazoo Racing WRT | Toyota Yaris WRC | 10 | (Finland) Jari-Matti Latvala | MON; 2 | SWE; 1 | MEX; 6 | FRA; 4 | ARG; 5 | POR; 9 | ITA; 2 | POL; 20 | FIN; 21 | GER; 7 | ESP; Ret | GBR; 5 | AUS; Ret | | 4th | 136 | 3rd | 251 |
| 2017 | Toyota Gazoo Racing WRT | Toyota Yaris WRC | 11 | (Finland) Juho Hänninen | MON; 16 | SWE; 23 | MEX; 7 | FRA; Ret | ARG; 7 | POR; 7 | ITA; 6 | POL; 10 | FIN; 3 | GER; 4 | ESP; 4 | GBR; Ret | | | 9th | 71 | 3rd | 251 |
| 2017 | Toyota Gazoo Racing WRT | Toyota Yaris WRC | 11 | (Finland) Esapekka Lappi | | | | | | | | | | | | | AUS; 6 | | 11th | 62 | 3rd | 251 |
| 2017 | Toyota Gazoo Racing WRT | Toyota Yaris WRC | 12 | (Finland) Esapekka Lappi | MON | SWE | MEX | FRA | ARG | POR; 10 | ITA; 4 | POL; Ret | FIN; 1 | GER; 21 | ESP; Ret | GBR; 9 | AUS | | 11th | 62 | 3rd | 251 |
| 2018 | Toyota Gazoo Racing WRT | Toyota Yaris WRC | | | | | | | | | | | | | | | | | | | | |
| 2018 | Toyota Gazoo Racing WRT | Toyota Yaris WRC | 7 | (Finland) Jari-Matti Latvala | MON; 3 | SWE; 7 | MEX; 8 | FRA; Ret | ARG; Ret | POR; 24 | ITA; 7 | FIN; 3 | GER; Ret | TUR; 2 | GBR; 2 | ESP; 8 | AUS; 1 | | 4th | 128 | 1st | 368 |
| 2018 | Toyota Gazoo Racing WRT | Toyota Yaris WRC | 8 | (Estonia) Ott Tänak | MON; 2 | SWE; 9 | MEX; 14 | FRA; 2 | ARG; 1 | POR; Ret | ITA; 9 | FIN; 1 | GER; 1 | TUR; 1 | GBR; 19 | ESP; 6 | AUS; Ret | | 3rd | 181 | 1st | 368 |
| 2018 | Toyota Gazoo Racing WRT | Toyota Yaris WRC | 9 | (Finland) Esapekka Lappi | MON; 7 | SWE; 4 | MEX; 11 | FRA; 6 | ARG; 8 | POR; 5 | ITA; 3 | FIN; Ret | GER; 3 | TUR; Ret | GBR; 3 | ESP; 7 | AUS; 4 | | 5th | 126 | 1st | 368 |
| 2019 | Toyota Gazoo Racing WRT | Toyota Yaris WRC | 5 | (United Kingdom) Kris Meeke | MON; 6 | SWE; 6 | MEX; 5 | FRA; 9 | ARG; 4 | CHL; 10 | POR; Ret | ITA; 8 | FIN; Ret | GER; 2 | TUR; 7 | GBR; 4 | ESP; 29 | AUS; C | 6th | 98 | 2nd | 362 |
| 2019 | Toyota Gazoo Racing WRT | Toyota Yaris WRC | 8 | (Estonia) Ott Tänak | MON; 3 | SWE; 1 | MEX; 2 | FRA; 6 | ARG; 8 | CHL; 1 | POR; 1 | ITA; 5 | FIN; 1 | GER; 1 | TUR; 16 | GBR; 1 | ESP; 2 | AUS; C | 1st | 263 | 2nd | 362 |
| 2019 | Toyota Gazoo Racing WRT | Toyota Yaris WRC | 10 | (Finland) Jari-Matti Latvala | MON; 5 | SWE; 21 | MEX; 8 | FRA; 10 | ARG; 5 | CHL; 11 | POR; 7 | ITA; 19 | FIN; 3 | GER; 3 | TUR; 6 | GBR; Ret | ESP; 5 | AUS; C | 7th | 94 | 2nd | 362 |
| 2020 | Toyota Gazoo Racing WRT | Toyota Yaris WRC | 17 | (France) Sébastien Ogier | MON; 2 | SWE; 4 | MEX; 1 | EST; 3 | TUR; Ret | ITA; 3 | MNZ; 1 | | | | | | | | 1st | 122 | 2nd | 236 |
| 2020 | Toyota Gazoo Racing WRT | Toyota Yaris WRC | 33 | (United Kingdom) Elfyn Evans | MON; 3 | SWE; 1 | MEX; 4 | EST; 4 | TUR; 1 | ITA; 4 | MNZ; 29 | | | | | | | | 2nd | 114 | 2nd | 236 |
| 2020 | Toyota Gazoo Racing WRT | Toyota Yaris WRC | 69 | (Finland) Kalle Rovanperä | MON; 5 | SWE; 3 | MEX; 5 | EST; 5 | TUR; 4 | ITA; Ret | MNZ; 5 | | | | | | | | 5th | 80 | 2nd | 236 |
| 2021 | Toyota Gazoo Racing WRT | Toyota Yaris WRC | 1 | (France) Sébastien Ogier | MON; 1 | ARC; 20 | CRO; 1 | POR; 3 | ITA; 1 | KEN; 1 | EST; 4 | BEL; 5 | GRE; 3 | FIN; 5 | ESP; 4 | MNZ; 1 | | | 1st | 230 | 1st | 520 |
| 2021 | Toyota Gazoo Racing WRT | Toyota Yaris WRC | 33 | (United Kingdom) Elfyn Evans | MON; 2 | ARC; 5 | CRO; 2 | POR; 1 | ITA; 2 | KEN; 10 | EST; 5 | BEL; 4 | GRE; 6 | FIN; 1 | ESP; 2 | MNZ; 2 | | | 2nd | 207 | 1st | 520 |
| 2021 | Toyota Gazoo Racing WRT | Toyota Yaris WRC | 69 | (Finland) Kalle Rovanperä | MON; 4 | ARC; 2 | CRO; Ret | POR; 22 | ITA; 25 | KEN; 6 | EST; 1 | BEL; 3 | GRE; 1 | FIN; 34 | ESP; 5 | MNZ; 9 | | | 4th | 142 | 1st | 520 |

== WRC Results (Rally1 era) ==
| Year | Entrant | Car | No | Driver | 1 | 2 | 3 | 4 | 5 | 6 | 7 | 8 | 9 | 10 | 11 | 12 | 13 | 14 | WDC | Points | WMC | Points |
|---|---|---|---|---|---|---|---|---|---|---|---|---|---|---|---|---|---|---|---|---|---|---|
| 2022 | Toyota Gazoo Racing WRT | Toyota GR Yaris Rally1 | 1 | (France) Sébastien Ogier | MON; 2 | SWE | CRO | POR; 51 | ITA | KEN; 4 | EST | FIN | BEL | GRE | NZL; 2 | ESP; 1 | JPN; 4 | | 6th | 97 | 1st | 525 |
| 2022 | Toyota Gazoo Racing WRT | Toyota GR Yaris Rally1 | 4 | (Finland) Esapekka Lappi | MON | SWE; 3 | CRO; 49 | POR | ITA; 44 | KEN | EST; 6 | FIN; 3 | BEL; 3 | GRE; 22 | NZL | ESP | JPN | | 9th | 58 | 1st | 525 |
| 2022 | Toyota Gazoo Racing WRT | Toyota GR Yaris Rally1 | 33 | (United Kingdom) Elfyn Evans | MON; 21 | SWE; Ret | CRO; 5 | POR; 2 | ITA; 40 | KEN; 2 | EST; 2 | FIN; 4 | BEL; 2 | GRE; Ret | NZL; Ret | ESP; 6 | JPN; 5 | | 4th | 134 | 1st | 525 |
| 2022 | Toyota Gazoo Racing WRT | Toyota GR Yaris Rally1 | 69 | (Finland) Kalle Rovanperä | MON; 4 | SWE; 1 | CRO; 1 | POR; 1 | ITA; 5 | KEN; 1 | EST; 1 | FIN; 2 | BEL; 62 | GRE; 15 | NZL; 1 | ESP; 3 | JPN; 12 | | 1st | 255 | 1st | 525 |
| 2022 | Toyota Gazoo Racing WRT NG | Toyota GR Yaris Rally1 | 18 | (Japan) Takamoto Katsuta | MON; 8 | SWE; 4 | CRO; 6 | POR; 4 | ITA; 6 | KEN; 3 | EST; 5 | FIN; 6 | BEL; 5 | GRE; 6 | NZL; Ret | ESP; 7 | JPN; 3 | | 5th | 138 | 4th | 138 |
| 2023 | Toyota Gazoo Racing WRT | Toyota GR Yaris Rally1 | 17 | (France) Sébastien Ogier | MON; 1 | SWE | MEX; 1 | CRO; 5 | POR | ITA; 14 | KEN; 1 | EST | FIN | GRE; 10 | CHL | EUR; 4 | JPN; 2 | | 5th | 133 | 1st | 548 |
| 2023 | Toyota Gazoo Racing WRT | Toyota GR Yaris Rally1 | 18 | (Japan) Takamoto Katsuta | MON; 6 | SWE; Ret | MEX; 23 | CRO; 6 | POR; 33 | ITA; 40 | KEN; 4 | EST; 7 | FIN; 3 | GRE; 6 | CHL; 5 | EUR; 5 | JPN; 5 | | 7th | 101 | 1st | 548 |
| 2023 | Toyota Gazoo Racing WRT | Toyota GR Yaris Rally1 | 33 | (United Kingdom) Elfyn Evans | MON; 4 | SWE; 5 | MEX; 3 | CRO; 1 | POR; Ret | ITA; 4 | KEN; 3 | EST; 4 | FIN; 1 | GRE; 2 | CHL; 3 | EUR; 31 | JPN; 1 | | 2nd | 216 | 1st | 548 |
| 2023 | Toyota Gazoo Racing WRT | Toyota GR Yaris Rally1 | 37 | (Italy) Lorenzo Bertelli | MON | SWE; 14 | MEX | CRO | POR | ITA | KEN | EST | FIN | GRE | CHL | EUR | JPN | | - | - | 1st | 548 |
| 2023 | Toyota Gazoo Racing WRT | Toyota GR Yaris Rally1 | 69 | (Finland) Kalle Rovanperä | MON; 2 | SWE; 4 | MEX; 4 | CRO; 4 | POR; 1 | ITA; 3 | KEN; 2 | EST; 1 | FIN; Ret | GRE; 1 | CHL; 4 | EUR; 2 | JPN; 3 | | 1st | 250 | 1st | 548 |
| 2023 | Toyota Gazoo Racing WRT | Toyota GR Yaris Rally1 | 97 | (Finland) Jari-Matti Latvala | MON | SWE | MEX | CRO | POR | ITA | KEN | EST | FIN; 5 | GRE | CHL | EUR | JPN | | 18th | 11 | 1st | 548 |
| 2024 | Toyota Gazoo Racing WRT | Toyota GR Yaris Rally1 | 5 | (Finland) Sami Pajari | MON | SWE | KEN | CRO | POR | ITA | POL | LAT | FIN; 4 | GRE | CHL; 6 | EUR; Ret | JPN | | 15th | 19 | 1st | 561 |
| 2024 | Toyota Gazoo Racing WRT | Toyota GR Yaris Rally1 | 17 | (France) Sébastien Ogier | MON; 2 | SWE | KEN | CRO; 1 | POR; 1 | ITA; 2 | POL; WD | LAT; 2 | FIN; 1 | GRE; 16 | CHL; 36 | EUR; Ret | JPN; 2 | | 4th | 191 | 1st | 561 |
| 2024 | Toyota Gazoo Racing WRT | Toyota GR Yaris Rally1 | 18 | (Japan) Takamoto Katsuta | MON; 7 | SWE; 45 | KEN; 2 | CRO; 5 | POR; 29 | ITA; 35 | POL; 8 | LAT; 6 | FIN; 41 | GRE; 30 | CHL; WD | EUR; 4 | JPN; 4 | | 6th | 116 | 1st | 561 |
| 2024 | Toyota Gazoo Racing WRT | Toyota GR Yaris Rally1 | 33 | (United Kingdom) Elfyn Evans | MON; 3 | SWE; 2 | KEN; 4 | CRO; 2 | POR; 6 | ITA; 4 | POL; 2 | LAT; 5 | FIN; Ret | GRE; 18 | CHL; 2 | EUR; 2 | JPN; 1 | | 2nd | 210 | 1st | 561 |
| 2024 | Toyota Gazoo Racing WRT | Toyota GR Yaris Rally1 | 37 | (Italy) Lorenzo Bertelli | MON | SWE; 10 | KEN | CRO | POR | ITA | POL | LAT | FIN | GRE | CHL | EUR | JPN | | - | - | 1st | 561 |
| 2024 | Toyota Gazoo Racing WRT | Toyota GR Yaris Rally1 | 69 | (Finland) Kalle Rovanperä | MON | SWE; 39 | KEN; 1 | CRO | POR; 31 | ITA | POL; 1 | LAT; 1 | FIN; Ret | GRE | CHL; 1 | EUR | JPN | | 7th | 114 | 1st | 561 |
| 2025 | Toyota Gazoo Racing WRT | Toyota GR Yaris Rally1 | 17 | (France) Sébastien Ogier | MON; 1 | SWE | KEN | ESP; 2 | POR; 1 | ITA; 1 | GRE; 2 | EST | FIN; 3 | PAR; 1 | CHL; 1 | EUR; 29 | JPN; 1 | SAU; 3 | 1st | 293 | 1st | 735 |
| 2025 | Toyota Gazoo Racing WRT | Toyota GR Yaris Rally1 | 18 | (Japan) Takamoto Katsuta | MON; Ret | SWE; 2 | KEN; Ret | ESP; 4 | POR; 5 | ITA; 5 | GRE; 30 | EST; Ret | FIN; 2 | PAR; 16 | CHL; 7 | EUR; 4 | JPN; 14 | SAU; 5 | 6th | 122 | 1st | 735 |
| 2025 | Toyota Gazoo Racing WRT | Toyota GR Yaris Rally1 | 33 | (United Kingdom) Elfyn Evans | MON; 2 | SWE; 1 | KEN; 1 | ESP; 3 | POR; 6 | ITA; 4 | GRE; 4 | EST; 6 | FIN; 4 | PAR; 2 | CHL; 2 | EUR; 2 | JPN; 2 | SAU; 6 | 2nd | 289 | 1st | 735 |
| 2025 | Toyota Gazoo Racing WRT | Toyota GR Yaris Rally1 | 69 | (Finland) Kalle Rovanperä | MON; 4 | SWE; 5 | KEN; Ret | ESP; 1 | POR; 3 | ITA; 3 | GRE; 26 | EST; 4 | FIN; 1 | PAR; 5 | CHL; 6 | EUR; 1 | JPN; 6 | SAU; 7 | 3rd | 256 | 1st | 735 |
| 2025 | Toyota Gazoo Racing WRT | Toyota GR Yaris Rally1 | 99 | (Sweden) Oliver Solberg | MON | SWE | KEN | ESP | POR | ITA | GRE | EST; 1 | FIN | PAR | CHL | EUR | JPN | SAU | 10th | 33 | 1st | 735 |
| 2025 | Toyota Gazoo Racing WRT2 | Toyota GR Yaris Rally1 | 5 | (Finland) Sami Pajari | MON; Ret | SWE; 7 | KEN; 4 | ESP; Ret | POR; 7 | ITA; 7 | GRE; 46 | EST; 7 | FIN; 5 | PAR; 6 | CHL; 5 | EUR; 6 | JPN; 3 | SAU; 4 | 8th | 107 | 4th | 158 |
| 2026 | Toyota Gazoo Racing WRT | Toyota GR Yaris Rally1 | 1 | (France) Sébastien Ogier | MON; 3 | SWE | KEN; 11 | CRO | ESP; 1 | POR; 6 | JPN; 2 | GRE; 1 | EST; 5 | FIN; Ret | PAR; 34 | CHL; 2 | ITA; 2 | SAU; C | 4th | 189 | 1st | 662 |
| 2026 | Toyota Gazoo Racing WRT | Toyota GR Yaris Rally1 | 18 | (Japan) Takamoto Katsuta | MON; 7 | SWE; 2 | KEN; 1 | CRO; 1 | ESP; 4 | POR; 5 | JPN; 4 | GRE; 3 | EST; 21 | FIN; 6 | PAR; Ret | CHL; 36 | ITA; 6 | SAU; C | 6th | 175 | 1st | 662 |
| 2026 | Toyota Gazoo Racing WRT | Toyota GR Yaris Rally1 | 33 | (United Kingdom) Elfyn Evans | MON; 2 | SWE; 1 | KEN; 13 | CRO; 34 | ESP; 2 | POR; 3 | JPN; 1 | GRE; 5 | EST; 6 | FIN; 3 | PAR; 4 | CHL; 5 | ITA; 5 | SAU; C | 1st | 243 | 1st | 662 |
| 2026 | Toyota Gazoo Racing WRT | Toyota GR Yaris Rally1 | 37 | (Italy) Lorenzo Bertelli | MON | SWE; 15 | KEN | CRO | ESP | POR | JPN | GRE | EST | FIN | PAR | CHL | ITA | SAU; C | NC | 0 | 1st | 662 |
| 2026 | Toyota Gazoo Racing WRT | Toyota GR Yaris Rally1 | 99 | (Sweden) Oliver Solberg | MON; 1 | SWE; 4 | KEN; 10 | CRO; 42 | ESP; Ret | POR; 2 | JPN; 21 | GRE; 16 | EST; 2 | FIN; 2 | PAR; 5 | CHL; 1 | ITA; 1 | SAU; C | 2nd | 238 | 1st | 662 |
| 2026 | Toyota Gazoo Racing WRT2 | Toyota GR Yaris Rally1 | 5 | (Finland) Sami Pajari | MON; Ret | SWE; 3 | KEN; 3 | CRO; 2 | ESP; 3 | POR; 7 | JPN; 3 | GRE; 4 | EST; 1 | FIN; 1 | PAR; 1 | CHL; 4 | ITA; 3 | SAU; C | 3rd | 237 | 3rd | 251 |

* Season still in progress.
