= Andrea Aghini =

Italian rally driver (born 1963)

Personal information
- Nationality: (Italy) Italian
- Full name: Andrea Aghini Lombardi
- Born: 29 December 1963 (age 62)

World Rally Championship record
- Years active: 1986–2000
- Co-driver: (Italy) Sauro Farnocchia (Italy) Loris Roggia (Italy) Dario D'esposito
- Teams: Peugeot, Jolly Club, Lancia, Toyota, H.F. Grifone, Mitsubishi
- Rallies: 26
- Championships: 0
- Rally wins: 1
- Podiums: 5
- Stage wins: 23
- Total points: 117
- First rally: 1986 Rallye Sanremo
- First win: 1992 Rallye Sanremo
- Last win: 1992 Rallye Sanremo
- Last rally: 2000 Rallye Sanremo

Andrea Aghini Lombardi (born 29 December 1963 in Livorno, Tuscany) is an Italian rally driver. He won the 1992 Rallye Sanremo and took four other podium finishes in the World Rally Championship from 1992 to 1995. In 1992, he also won the Race of Champions, after beating Carlos Sainz in the semi-final and Colin McRae in the final.

== Career ==
Aghini began his rallying career on national events with a Peugeot 205 GTI in 1984. He debuted in the World Rally Championship driving a Renault 5 GT Turbo at his home event, the Rallye San Remo, in 1986. He retired from the rally after a turbo problem, but two years later, he won the Group N class of the event. For the 1991 season, Aghini got a contract with the Lancia-supported Jolly Club team for two WRC events; the Sanremo and the Rally Catalunya. He drove his Delta Integrale 16V to fifth place in both rallies, taking his first drivers' world championship points.

These results earned Aghini a drive with Martini Racing, Lancia's factory team, for the following season. He finished sixth at the Tour de Corse, and then edged out his team-mate Juha Kankkunen to take his first and only world rally win in Sanremo. Aghini's second podium finish followed in Catalunya. After Lancia withdrew from the WRC, he moved back to Jolly Club to partner defending world champion Carlos Sainz. His only podium finish of the season came at the Rally Portugal, where he took third place behind Ford's François Delecour and Miki Biasion.

In 1994, Aghini partnered Kankkunen and Didier Auriol at the Toyota factory team in a few events and finished third at the Tour de Corse with a Celica Turbo 4WD. He repeated this feat in the 1995 season, driving a Mitsubishi Lancer Evolution 3 for the Team Mitsubishi Ralliart. With consistent results, he also equalled his career-best seventh place in the drivers' championship from 1992. Aghini then became less active in the WRC. He won the Italian Rally Championship with a Toyota Corolla WRC in 1998 and 1999. In 1998, he also finished runner-up in the European Rally Championship.

== Results ==
=== WRC results ===
Year	Team/Entrant	Car	WRC Round														WDC	Points
Year	Team/Entrant	Car	1	2	3	4	5	6	7	8	9	10	11	12	13	14	WDC	Points
1986	Privateer	Renault 5 GT Turbo	MON	SWE	POR	KEN	FRA	GRE	NZL	ARG	FIN	CIV	ITA; RET	GBR	USA			0
1987	Privateer	Peugeot 205 GTI	MON	SWE	POR	KEN	FRA	GRE	USA	NZL	ARG	FIN	CIV	ITA; RET	GBR			0
1988	Peugeot Talbot Sport	Peugeot 309 GTI	MON	SWE	POR	KEN	FRA	GRE	USA	NZL	ARG	FIN	CIV	ITA; 12	GBR			0
1989	Peugeot Team Italia	Peugeot 405 Mi16	SWE	MON	POR	KEN	FRA	GRE	NZL	ARG	FIN	AUS	CIV	ITA; RET	GBR			0
1991	Jolly Club	Lancia Delta Integrale 16V	MON	SWE	POR	KEN	FRA	GRE	NZL	ARG	FIN	AUS	ITA; 5	CIV	ESP; 5	GBR	14th	16
1992	Martini Lancia	Lancia Delta HF Integrale	MON	SWE	POR; RET	KEN	FRA; 6	GRE	NZL	ARG	FIN	AUS	ITA; 1	CIV	ESP; 3	GBR; 10	7th	39
1993	Jolly Club	Lancia Delta HF Integrale	MON; RET	SWE	POR; 3	KEN	FRA; RET	GRE; 4	ARG	NZL	FIN	AUS	ITA; RET	ESP	GBR		14th	22
1994	Toyota Castrol Team	Toyota Celica Turbo 4WD	MON	POR; RET	KEN	FRA; 3	GRE	ARG	NZL	FIN							14th	12
1994	HF Grifone	Toyota Celica Turbo 4WD									ITA; RET	GBR					14th	12
1995	Mitsubishi Ralliart	Mitsubishi Lancer Evolution III	MON; 6	SWE	POR	FRA; 3	NZL	AUS	ESP; 5	GBR							7th	26
1997	HF Grifone	Toyota Celica GT-Four ST205	MON	SWE	KEN	POR	ESP	FRA	ARG	GRE	NZL	FIN	INA	ITA; 7	AUS	GBR		0
1998	HF Grifone	Toyota Corolla WRC	MON	SWE	KEN	POR	ESP	FRA	ARG	GRE	NZL	FIN	ITA; 9	AUS	GBR			0
1999	HF Grifone	Toyota Corolla WRC	MON	SWE	KEN	POR	ESP	FRA	ARG	GRE	NZL	FIN	CHN	ITA; 5	AUS	GBR	18th	2
2000	Ralliart Italia	Mitsubishi Carisma GT	MON	SWE	KEN	POR	ESP	ARG; RET	GRE	NZL	FIN	CYP	FRA	ITA; 15	AUS	GBR		0

Sporting positions
Preceded by Juha Kankkunen	Race of Champions; Champion of Champions; 1992	Succeeded by Didier Auriol
Preceded by Timo Salonen	Race of Champions; Rally Master; 1995	Succeeded by Flavio Alonso
