= 1995 Monte Carlo Rally =

Rallying motorsport event

1995 Monte Carlo Rally 63ème Rallye Automobile de Monte-Carlo
Round 1 of the 1995 World Rally Championship
Next event →
- Host country: Monaco
- Dates run: 21 – 26 January 1995
- Stages: 21
- Stage surface: Asphalt/Snow
- Overall distance: 546.80 km (339.77 miles)

Statistics
- Crews: 199 at start, 82 at finish

Overall results
- Overall winner: (Spain) Carlos Sainz; Subaru Impreza; 6:32:31

The 1995 Monte Carlo Rally was the 63rd Rallye Automobile de Monte-Carlo. It was won by Carlos Sainz.

It was part of the 1995 World Rally Championship.

== Results ==
Pos.	No.	Driver	Car	Time/Retired	Pts.
1	5	(Spain) Carlos Sainz	Subaru Impreza 555	6:32:31	20
2	7	(France) François Delecour	Ford Escort RS Cosworth	6:34:56	15
3	2	(Finland) Juha Kankkunen	Toyota Celica GT-Four	6:36:28	12
4	11	(Finland) Tommi Mäkinen	Mitsubishi Lancer Evo II	6:37:10	10
5	8	(Belgium) Bruno Thiry	Ford Escort RS Cosworth	6:39:18	8
6	12	(Italy) Andrea Aghini	Mitsubishi Lancer Evo II	6:43:17	6
7	14	(France) Jean Ragnotti	Renault Clio Maxi	7:04:26	4
8	6	(Italy) Piero Liatti	Subaru Impreza 555	7:09:54	3
9	24	(Switzerland) Phlippe Camandona	Ford Escort RS Cosworth	7:13:01	2
10	17	(Germany) Isolde Holderied	Mitsubishi Lancer Evo II	7:13:34	1

== Stage winners ==
St.	Name	No.	Driver	Car	Time	Avg.
SS1	Saint-Pierreville - Antraigues (29.65 km)	4	(Scotland) Colin McRae	Subaru Impreza 555	20m46s	85.67 km/h
SS2	La Souche - Col de la Chavade (27.07 km)	5	(Spain) Carlos Sainz	Subaru Impreza 555	17m57s	90.48 km/h
SS3	Burzet - Saint-Martial (41.27 km)	5	(Spain) Carlos Sainz	Subaru Impreza 555	28m20s	87.40 km/h
SS4	Freydaparet - Louveton (16.82 km)	7	(France) François Delecour	Ford Escort RS Cosworth	10m07s	99.76 km/h
SS5	Saint-Bonnet-le-Froid (25.74 km)	4	(Scotland) Colin McRae	Subaru Impreza 555	15m01s	102.85 km/h
SS6	Lalouvesc - Col du Marchand (31.16 km)	7	(France) François Delecour	Ford Escort RS Cosworth	20m07s	92.94 km/h
SS7	Saint-Jean-en-Royans - Font d'Urle (25.37 km)	5	(Spain) Carlos Sainz	Subaru Impreza 555	15m38s	97.37 km/h
SS8	Prélenfrey - Saint-Michel-les-Portes (32.50 km)	7	(France) François Delecour	Ford Escort RS Cosworth	24m02s	81.14 km/h
SS9	Les Oches - Les Nonières (19.34 km)	7	(France) François Delecour	Ford Escort RS Cosworth	17m01s	68.19 km/h
SS10	L'Epine - Rosans (31.15 km)	7	(France) François Delecour	Ford Escort RS Cosworth	20m31s	91.10 km/h
SS11	Ruissas - Col Saint-Jean (22.31 km)	5	(Spain) Carlos Sainz	Subaru Impreza 555	13m30s	99.16 km/h
SS12	Sisteron - Thoard (36.67 km)	8	(Belgium) Bruno Thiry	Ford Escort RS Cosworth	27m18s	80.59 km/h
SS13	Châteauvieux (19.19 km)	5	(Spain) Carlos Sainz	Subaru Impreza 555	13m55s	82.74 km/h
SS14	Col Saint-Raphaël (23.41 km)	2	(Finland) Juha Kankkunen	Toyota Celica GT-Four (ST205)	17m36s	79.81 km/h
SS15	Loda - Lucéram (16.49 km)	8	(Belgium) Bruno Thiry	Ford Escort RS Cosworth	13m58s	70.84 km/h
SS16	Moulinet - La Bollène Vésubie (23.24 km)	5	(Spain) Carlos Sainz	Subaru Impreza 555	18m56s	73.65 km/h
SS17	Saint-Sauveur (14.77 km)	7	(France) François Delecour	Ford Escort RS Cosworth	11m35s	76.51 km/h
SS18	Entrevaux - Saint-Pierre (29.71 km)	5	(Spain) Carlos Sainz	Subaru Impreza 555	21m44s	82.02 km/h
SS19	Col Saint-Raphaël (23.41 km)	8	(Belgium) Bruno Thiry	Ford Escort RS Cosworth	17m57s	78.25 km/h
SS20	Pont des Miolans (24.03 km)	2	(Finland) Juha Kankkunen	Toyota Celica GT-Four (ST205)	15m42s	91.83 km/h
SS21	Les Quatres Chemins (33.50 km)	2	(Finland) Juha Kankkunen	Toyota Celica GT-Four (ST205)	26m53s	74.77 km/h
