= Mats Jonsson (rally driver) =

Swedish rally driver (born 1957)

Personal information
- Nationality: (Sweden) Swedish
- Born: 28 November 1957 (age 68)

World Rally Championship record
- Years active: 1979–1993, 1995–2001, 2007
- Co-driver: (Sweden) Per Hansson (Sweden) Magnus Olsson (Sweden) Sven-Olov Kvarnlöv (Sweden) Johnny Johansson (Sweden) Åke Gustavsson (Sweden) Lars Bäckman (United Kingdom) Bryan Thomas (Sweden) Anders Olsson
- Teams: Opel Team Sweden, GM Euro Sport, Toyota, Subaru
- Rallies: 40
- Championships: 0
- Rally wins: 2
- Podiums: 3
- Stage wins: 36
- Total points: 102
- First rally: 1979 Swedish Rally
- First win: 1992 Swedish Rally
- Last win: 1993 Swedish Rally
- Last rally: 2007 Swedish Rally

Mats Jonsson (born November 28, 1957) is a rally driver from Sweden. He competed in the World Rally Championship from 1984 to 1993, with a best position of 12th overall in the 1991 season.. His greatest individual events were in his home Swedish Rally, which he won outright in successive years in 1992 and 1993. He has won the Swedish rally championship 17 times

He continues to compete in Scandinavian events, and in both the European and Estonian Rally Championships, in a Group A Ford Escort.

== WRC victories ==
#	Event	Season	Co-driver	Car
1	(Sweden) 41st International Swedish Rally	1992	Lars Bäckman	Toyota Celica GT-Four ST165
2	(Sweden) 42nd International Swedish Rally	1993	Lars Bäckman	Toyota Celica Turbo 4WD
