= 1995 World Rally Championship =

23rd season of the FIA World Rally Championship

Champions
- World Drivers' Champion: Colin McRae
- World Manufacturers' Champion: Subaru

Seasons
- ← 1994 1996 →

The 1995 World Rally Championship was the 23rd season of the Fédération Internationale de l'Automobile (FIA) World Rally Championship (WRC). The season consisted of 8 rallies. The drivers' world championship was won by Colin McRae in a Subaru Impreza 555, ahead of team-mate Carlos Sainz. The manufacturers' title was won by Subaru.

Toyota was caught using illegal turbo restrictors at the Rally Catalunya and were given a one-year ban by the FIA. FIA president Max Mosley called the illegal turbo restrictor "the most sophisticated device I've ever seen in 30 years of motor sports." Toyota and their drivers, Juha Kankkunen, Didier Auriol and Armin Schwarz, were also stripped of all points in the championships. Kankkunen had been in contention for the drivers' world title. Mosley stated that "there is no suggestion the drivers were aware of what was going on."

== Calendar ==
The 1995 championship was contested over eight rounds in Europe and Oceania.

Rd.	Start date	Finish date	Rally	Rally headquarters	Surface	Stages	Distance
1	23 January	26 January	(Monaco) 63rd Rallye Automobile Monte-Carlo	Monte Carlo	Mixed	21	546.80 km
2	10 February	12 February	(Sweden) 44th International Swedish Rally	Karlstad, Värmland County	Snow	25	501.12 km
3	8 March	10 March	29th TAP Rallye de Portugal	Figueira da Foz, Coimbra	Gravel	33	476.56 km
4	3 May	5 May	39th Tour de Corse - Rallye de France	Ajaccio, Corsica	Tarmac	22	481.17 km
5	27 July	30 July	26th Smokefree Rally New Zealand	Manukau, Auckland	Gravel	33	560.89 km
6	15 September	18 September	8th Telstra Rally Australia	Perth, Western Australia	Gravel	30	503.88 km
7	23 October	25 October	(Spain) 31st Rallye Catalunya - Costa Brava - Rallye de España	Lloret de Mar, Catalonia	Tarmac	23	474.35 km
8	19 November	22 November	(United Kingdom) 51st Network Q RAC Rally	Chester, Cheshire	Gravel	28	510.70 km

== Teams and drivers ==
=== Manufacturer entries ===
Team	Manufacturer	Car	Tyre	No.	Driver	Co-Driver	Rounds
(Japan) Toyota Castrol Team	Toyota	Celica GT-Four (ST205)	M	1	(France) Didier Auriol	(France) Bernard Occelli	1–3
(Japan) Toyota Castrol Team	Toyota	Celica GT-Four (ST205)	M	1	(France) Didier Auriol	(France) Denis Giraudet	4–7
(Japan) Toyota Castrol Team	Toyota	Celica GT-Four (ST205)	M	2	(Finland) Juha Kankkunen	(United Kingdom) Nicky Grist	1–7
(Japan) Toyota Castrol Team	Toyota	Celica GT-Four (ST205)	M	3	(Germany) Armin Schwarz	(Germany) Klaus Wicha	1–7
(Japan) Toyota Castrol Team	Toyota	Celica GT-Four (ST205)	M	14	(Sweden) Thomas Rådström	(Sweden) Lars Bäckman	2
(Japan) Toyota Castrol Team	Toyota	Celica GT-Four (ST205)	M	14	(Japan) Yoshio Fujimoto	(Sweden) Arne Hertz	6
(Japan) Toyota Castrol Team	Toyota	Celica GT-Four (ST205)	M	15	(Japan) Yoshio Fujimoto	(Sweden) Arne Hertz	5
(Japan) 555 Subaru WRT	Subaru	Impreza 555	P	4	(United Kingdom) Colin McRae	(United Kingdom) Derek Ringer	All
(Japan) 555 Subaru WRT	Subaru	Impreza 555	P	5	(Spain) Carlos Sainz	(Spain) Luis Moya	1–4, 6–8
(Japan) 555 Subaru WRT	Subaru	Impreza 555	P	6	(Italy) Piero Liatti	(Italy) Alessandro Alessandrini	1, 4, 7
(Japan) 555 Subaru WRT	Subaru	Impreza 555	P	6	(Sweden) Mats Jonsson	(Sweden) Johnny Johansson	2
(Japan) 555 Subaru WRT	Subaru	Impreza 555	P	6	(United Kingdom) Richard Burns	(United Kingdom) Robert Reid	3, 8
(Japan) 555 Subaru WRT	Subaru	Impreza 555	P	6	(New Zealand) Peter 'Possum' Bourne	(New Zealand) Tony Sircombe	5–6
(Japan) 555 Subaru WRT	Subaru	Impreza 555	P	14	(United Kingdom) Richard Burns	(United Kingdom) Robert Reid	5
(United States) R.A.S. Ford	Ford	Escort RS Cosworth	M	7	(France) François Delecour	(France) Catherine François	All
(United States) R.A.S. Ford	Ford	Escort RS Cosworth	M	8	(Belgium) Bruno Thiry	(Belgium) Stéphane Prévot	All
(United States) R.A.S. Ford	Ford	Escort RS Cosworth	M	9	(Sweden) Stig Blomqvist	(Sweden) Benny Melander	2
(United States) R.A.S. Ford	Ford	Escort RS Cosworth	M	9	(Italy) Alessandro Fiorio	(Italy) Vittorio Brambilla	3
(United States) R.A.S. Ford	Ford	Escort RS Cosworth	M	9	(France) Patrick Bernardini	(France) Jean-Marc Andrié	4
(United States) R.A.S. Ford	Ford	Escort RS Cosworth	M	9	(New Zealand) Neil Allport	(New Zealand) Craig Vincent	5
(United States) R.A.S. Ford	Ford	Escort RS Cosworth	M	9	(United Kingdom) Malcolm Wilson	(United Kingdom) Bryan Thomas	8
(United States) R.A.S. Ford	Ford	Escort RS Cosworth (Grp. N)	M	30	(Canada) Jason Priestley	(United States) Kevin Caffrey	6
(Japan) Mitsubishi Ralliart	Mitsubishi	Lancer Evo II	M	10	(Sweden) Kenneth Eriksson	(Sweden) Staffan Parmander	2
(Japan) Mitsubishi Ralliart	Mitsubishi	Lancer Evo III	M	10	(Sweden) Kenneth Eriksson	(Sweden) Staffan Parmander	5–6, 8
(Japan) Mitsubishi Ralliart	Mitsubishi	Lancer Evo II (Grp. N)	P	10	(Germany) Isolde Holderied	(Sweden) Tina Thörner	3–4
(Japan) Mitsubishi Ralliart	Mitsubishi	Lancer Evo II	M	11	(Finland) Tommi Mäkinen	(Finland) Seppo Harjanne	1–2
(Japan) Mitsubishi Ralliart	Mitsubishi	Lancer Evo III	M	11	(Finland) Tommi Mäkinen	(Finland) Seppo Harjanne	4–8
(Japan) Mitsubishi Ralliart	Mitsubishi	Lancer Evo II (Grp. N)	P	11	(Argentina) Jorge Recalde	(Argentina) Martin Christie	3
(Japan) Mitsubishi Ralliart	Mitsubishi	Lancer Evo II	M	12	(Italy) Andrea Aghini	(Italy) Sauro Farnocchia	1
(Japan) Mitsubishi Ralliart	Mitsubishi	Lancer Evo III	M	12	(Italy) Andrea Aghini	(Italy) Sauro Farnocchia	4, 7
(Japan) Mitsubishi Ralliart	Mitsubishi	Lancer Evo II (Grp. N)	P	12	(Portugal) Rui Madeira	(Portugal) Nuno Rodrigues da Silva	3
(Japan) Mitsubishi Ralliart	Mitsubishi	Lancer Evo III (Grp. N)	P	12	(Portugal) Rui Madeira	(Portugal) Nuno Rodrigues da Silva	7–8
(Japan) Mitsubishi Ralliart	Mitsubishi	Lancer Evo III (Grp. N)	?	12	(Australia) Ed Ordynski	(Australia) Mark Stacey	5–6

=== Non Manufacturer Entries ===
Major entries not registered as manufacturers
Team	Manufacturer	Car	Tyre	Drivers	Co-drivers	Rounds
(France) Société Diac	Renault	Clio Maxi	M	(France) Jean Ragnotti	(France) Gilles Thimonier	1, 4
(France) Société Diac	Renault	Clio Maxi	M	(France) Philippe Bugalski	(France) Renaud Thierry	1
(France) Société Diac	Renault	Clio Maxi	M	(France) Philippe Bugalski	(France) Jean-Paul Chiaroni	4
(Portugal) Renault Gest Galp	Renault	Clio Maxi	M	(Portugal) José Carlos Macedo	(Portugal) Miguel Borges	3
(Portugal) Renault Gest Galp	Renault	Clio Maxi	M	(Portugal) Pedro Azeredo	(Portugal) Fernando Prata	3
(Spain) Renault Competicion	Renault	Clio Maxi	M	(Spain) Oriol Gómez	(Spain) Marc Martí	7
(United Kingdom) Renault Dealer Rallying UK	Renault	Clio Maxi	M	(France) Alain Oreille	(France) Jack Boyère	8
(United Kingdom) Renault Dealer Rallying UK	Renault	Clio Maxi	M	(United Kingdom) Robbie Head	(United Kingdom) Terry Harryman	8
(Slovenia) Darko Peljhan	Volkswagen	Golf G60 Rallye	?	(Slovenia) Darko Peljhan	(Slovenia) Miran Kacin	1
Volkswagen Motorsport Sweden	Volkswagen	Golf III GTi 16V	?	(Sweden) Harry Joki	(Sweden) Per Carlsson	2
Volkswagen Motorsport Sweden	Volkswagen	Golf III GTi 16V	?	(Sweden) Joakim Andersson	(Sweden) Göran Nyström	2
(United Kingdom) S.B.G. Sport	Volkswagen	Golf III Kit Car	P	(Finland) Tapio Laukkanen	(Finland) Risto Mannisenmäki	8
(Denmark) Autostal Duindistel	Opel	Calibra Turbo 4x4	?	(Denmark) Henrik Lundgaard	(Denmark) Freddy Pedersen	1
Opel Team Sweden	Opel	Astra GSi 16V	?	(Sweden) Per Svan	(Sweden) Johan Olsson	2
Opel Team Belgium	Opel	Astra GSi 16V	M	(Belgium) Freddy Loix	(Belgium) Sven Smeets	3–4
(Austria) Remus Racing	Opel	Astra GSi 16V	?	(Austria) Kris Rosenberger	(Germany) Hans-Dieter Stock	7
(Italy) Maurizio Verini	Lancia	Delta HF Integrale	P	(Italy) Maurizio Verini	(Italy) Enrico Roveda	1
(Portugal) Duriforte Construções	Lancia	Delta HF Integrale	P	(Portugal) Jorge Bica	(Portugal) João Sena	3
(France) Daniel Ducruet	Lancia	Delta HF Integrale	?	(France) Daniel Ducruet	(Monaco) Freddy Delorme	7
(Spain) Gamace MC Competición	Lancia	Delta HF Integrale	P	(Spain) Pedro Javier Diego	(Spain) Icíar Muguerza	7
(Italy) V.I.P Motorsport	Peugeot	306 S16	?	(Italy) Piergiorgio Deila	(Italy) Pierangelo Scalvini	1, 3
(France) Peugeot Sport	Peugeot	306 S16	M	(France) Fabien Doenlen	(France) Hervé Sauvage	4
(France) Peugeot Sport	Peugeot	306 S16	M	(France) Gilles Panizzi	(France) Hervé Panizzi	4
(Spain) Peugeot Sport España	Peugeot	306 S16	?	(Spain) Borja Moratal	(Spain) Alfredo Rodríguez	7
(Germany) Nikolai Burkart	Nissan	Sunny GTi	P	(Germany) Nikolai Burkart	(Germany) Regine Rausch	1, 3
(United Kingdom) Nissan F2	Nissan	Sunny GTi	P	(Belgium) Grégoire de Mevius	(Belgium) Jean-Marc Fortin	3
(United Kingdom) Nissan F2	Nissan	Sunny GTi	?	(Finland) Jarmo Kytölehto	(Finland) Arto Kapanen	8
(New Zealand) Argyle Autos	Nissan	Pulsar GTi-R	?	(New Zealand) Geoff Argyle	(New Zealand) Raymond Bennett	5
(France) Kremlyovskaya	Subaru	Impreza 555	?	(France) Yvan Postel	(France) Olivier Peyret	1, 4, 7
Indonesia Rally Team	Subaru	Impreza 555	?	(Indonesia) Tony Hardianto	(Indonesia) Anthony Sarwono	6
Indonesia Rally Team	Subaru	Impreza 555	?	(Indonesia) Irvan Gading	(Indonesia) Karel Harilatu	6
(New Zealand) Joe McAndrew	Subaru	Legacy RS	?	(New Zealand) Joe McAndrew	(New Zealand) Bob Haldane	5
(Switzerland) Christian Jaquillard	Ford	Escort RS Cosworth	?	(Switzerland) Christian Jaquillard	(Switzerland) Christiane Jaquillard	1
(Portugal) Totta Peres Competição	Ford	Escort RS Cosworth	?	(Portugal) Fernando Peres	(Portugal) Ricardo Caldeira	3
(Austria) Remus Racing	Ford	Escort RS Cosworth	?	(Austria) Kris Rosenberger	(Austria) Siegfried Schwarz	3–4
(New Zealand) Brian Stokes	Ford	Escort RS Cosworth	M	(New Zealand) Brian Stokes	(New Zealand) Ian Latham	5
(Indonesia) Bank Utama Rally Team	Ford	Escort RS Cosworth	?	(Indonesia) Pratikto Singgih	(United Kingdom) Phil Mills	6
(Belgium) Belgacom Rally Team	Ford	Escort RS Cosworth	P	(Belgium) Grégoire de Mevius	(Belgium) Jean-Marc Fortin	8
(United Kingdom) Jonny Milner	Ford	Escort RS Cosworth	Y	(United Kingdom) Jonny Milner	(United Kingdom) Steve Turvey	8
(United Kingdom) Alister McRae	Ford	Escort RS Cosworth	?	(United Kingdom) Alister McRae	(United Kingdom) David Senior	8
(United Kingdom) Ford Motorsport	Ford	Escort RS 2000 MKVI	M	(United Kingdom) Gwyndaf Evans	(United Kingdom) Howard Davies	8
Ford Team Finland	Ford	Escort RS 2000 MKVI	M	(Finland) Sebastian Lindholm	(Finland) Ilkka Riipinen	8
Toyota Castrol Team Sweden	Toyota	Celica Turbo 4WD (ST185)	M	(Sweden) 'Gullabo'	(Sweden) Ingemar Algerstedt	2
(Italy) H.F. Grifone SRL	Toyota	Celica Turbo 4WD (ST185)	M	(Finland) Marcus Grönholm	(Finland) Voitto Silander	2–3
(Italy) H.F. Grifone SRL	Toyota	Celica Turbo 4WD (ST185)	M	(Finland) Marcus Grönholm	(Finland) Timo Rautiainen	5
(Italy) H.F. Grifone SRL	Toyota	Celica Turbo 4WD (ST185)	P	(Italy) Andrea Navarra	(Italy) Renzo Casazza	8
(Italy) H.F. Grifone SRL	Toyota	Celica GT-Four (ST205)	P	(Italy) Andrea Navarra	(Italy) Renzo Casazza	7
Toyota Team Australia	Toyota	Celica GT-Four (ST205)	?	(Australia) Neal Bates	(Australia) Coral Taylor	6
(Uruguay) Gustavo Trelles	Toyota	Celica GT-Four (ST205)	P	(Uruguay) Gustavo Trelles	(Argentina) Jorge Del Buono	7
(Finland) Finnish Junior Rally Team	Vauxhall	Astra GSI 16V	?	(Finland) Jarmo Kytölehto	(Finland) Arto Kapanen	2
(Czech Republic) Škoda Motorsport	Škoda	Felicia Kit Car	M	(Sweden) 'Nalle'	(Sweden) Anders Olsson	2
(Czech Republic) Škoda Motorsport	Škoda	Felicia Kit Car	M	(Czech Republic) Pavel Sibera	(Czech Republic) Petr Gross	2–4, 8
(Czech Republic) Škoda Motorsport	Škoda	Felicia Kit Car	M	(Czech Republic) Emil Triner	(Czech Republic) Pavel Štanc	2–4
(Czech Republic) Škoda Motorsport	Škoda	Felicia Kit Car	M	(Sweden) Stig Blomqvist	(Sweden) Benny Melander	8
Mazda Team Sweden	Mazda	323 GT-R	?	(Sweden) Dick Larsson	(Sweden) Raymond Wessman	2
Mazda Team Sweden	Mazda	323 GT-R	?	(Sweden) Tony Bergdahl	(Sweden) Kent Jansson	2
(Sweden) Autopower	Audi	Coupé S2	?	(Sweden) Peter Friberg	(Sweden) Benny Locander	2
(Austria) Stohl Racing	Audi	Coupé S2	M	(Austria) Manfred Stohl	(Germany) Jürgen Bertl	3
(Austria) Stohl Racing	Audi	Coupé S2	M	(Austria) Manfred Stohl	(Austria) Reinhard Kaufmann	8
(Austria) Stohl Racing	Audi	Coupé S2	M	(Austria) Rudolf Stohl	(Germany) Jürgen Bertl	8
(Indonesia) Bank Utama Rally Team	Audi	Coupé S2	?	(Indonesia) Ari Sigit Harjojudanto	(Australia) Fredrik Thomas	6
(Spain) SEAT Sport	SEAT	Ibiza GTi 16V	M	(Germany) Erwin Weber	(Germany) Manfred Hiemer	3
(Spain) SEAT Sport	SEAT	Ibiza GTi 16V	M	(Spain) Antonio Rius	(Spain) Manuel Casanova	3, 7
(Spain) SEAT Sport	SEAT	Ibiza GTi 16V	M	(Spain) Jordi Ventura Manté	(Spain) Joan Sureda	7
Mitsubishi Ralliart New Zealand	Mitsubishi	Lancer Evo I	?	(New Zealand) Mark Leonard	(New Zealand) Garry Cowan	5
(Australia) Michael Guest	Mitsubishi	Lancer Evo II	?	(Australia) Michael Guest	(Australia) Steve O'Brien-Pounde	6
(Australia) David Officer	Mitsubishi	Lancer Evo II	?	(Australia) David Officer	(Australia) Kate Officer	6
(Japan) Silverstone Suzuki Sport	Suzuki	Cultus GTI	S	(Japan) Nobuhiro Tajima	(Australia) Ross Runnalls	5
(Japan) Silverstone Suzuki Sport	Suzuki	Swift GTi MK2	S	(Japan) Nobuhiro Tajima	(Australia) Ross Runnalls	6
(Taiwan) SanYang MIT Motorsport	Honda	Civic VTi	?	(Australia) Leigh Hynes	(Australia) Glenn Macneall	5–6
(Taiwan) SanYang MIT Motorsport	Honda	Civic VTi	?	(Taiwan) Dai-wei Yein	(New Zealand) Judy de Leeuwe	5
(Taiwan) SanYang MIT Motorsport	Honda	Civic VTi	?	(Taiwan) Ching-jung Kao	(Taiwan) Huan-shan Lai	6
(Australia) Hyundai Rally Sport	Hyundai	Lantra	?	(Australia) Wayne Bell	(Australia) Iain Stewart	6
(Australia) Hyundai Rally Sport	Hyundai	Lantra	?	(Australia) Rod Turnbull	(Australia) David Sinclair	6
Daihatsu Australia	Daihatsu	Charade GTi	?	(Australia) Robert Nicoli	(Australia) Brian Harwood	6
Daihatsu Australia	Daihatsu	Charade GTi	?	(Australia) Ross Mackenzie	(Australia) Tony Floyd	6
(South Korea) Kia Motorsport Korea	Kia	Sephia	?	(Australia) Rob Herridge	(Australia) David Hynes	6
(South Korea) Kia Motorsport Korea	Kia	Sephia	?	(South Korea) Park Jeong-Ryong	(Australia) Duncan Jordan	6
(Spain) Citroën Hispania	Citroën	ZX 16V	M	(Spain) Jesús Puras	(Spain) Carlos del Barrio	7
(Spain) Escudería Baix Empordà	BMW	M3 E30	P	(Spain) Josep Bassas	(Spain) Antonio Rodríguez	7

=== Group N Cup Entries ===
Team	Manufacturer	Car	Tyre	Drivers	Co-drivers	Rounds
Mitsubishi Ralliart Germany	Mitsubishi	Lancer Evo II	P	(Germany) Isolde Holderied	(Sweden) Christina Thörner	1, 3–6, 8
Mitsubishi Ralliart Germany	Mitsubishi	Lancer Evo III	P	(Germany) Isolde Holderied	(Sweden) Christina Thörner	7
Mitsubishi Ralliart Germany	Mitsubishi	Lancer Evo II	P	(Portugal) Rui Madeira	(Portugal) Nuno Rodrigues da Silva	1, 3–6
Mitsubishi Ralliart Germany	Mitsubishi	Lancer Evo III	P	(Portugal) Rui Madeira	(Portugal) Nuno Rodrigues da Silva	7–8
Mitsubishi Ralliart Germany	Mitsubishi	Lancer Evo II	P	(Argentina) Jorge Recalde	(Argentina) Martin Christie	3–6
Mitsubishi Ralliart Germany	Mitsubishi	Lancer Evo III	P	(Argentina) Jorge Recalde	(Argentina) Martin Christie	7
(Germany) Kathrein Renn- und Rallye Team	Mitsubishi	Lancer Evo II	?	(Germany) Hermann Gaßner sen.	(Germany) Siegfried Schrankl	1, 4
(Germany) Kathrein Renn- und Rallye Team	Mitsubishi	Lancer Evo II	?	(Germany) Hermann Gaßner sen.	(Germany) Harald Brock	3
(France) Jean-Paul Aymé	Mitsubishi	Lancer Evo II	?	(France) Jean-Paul Aymé	(France) Brigitte Aymé	1
Mitsubishi Ralliart Sweden	Mitsubishi	Lancer Evo II	?	(Sweden) Kenneth Bäcklund	(Sweden) Tord Andersson	2
Mitsubishi Ralliart Sweden	Mitsubishi	Lancer Evo II	?	(Sweden) Stig-Olov Walfridsson	(Sweden) Gunnar Barth	2
(Japan) Mitsubishi Ralliart	Mitsubishi	Lancer Evo III	?	(Australia) Ed Ordynski	(Australia) Mark Stacey	5–6
(Japan) Kiyoshi Inoue	Mitsubishi	Lancer Evo III	?	(Japan) Kiyoshi Inoue	(Japan) Yoshimasa Nakahara	5
(Japan) Hikaru Teshigawara	Mitsubishi	Lancer Evo III	?	(Japan) Hikaru Teshigawara	(Japan) Tadayoshi Sato	5
(Japan) Katsuhiko Taguchi	Mitsubishi	Lancer Evo III	?	(Japan) Katsuhiko Taguchi	(Lithuania) Fred Gocentas	5–6
Mitsubishi Ralliart New Zealand	Mitsubishi	Lancer Evo III	?	(New Zealand) Andrew Grant	(New Zealand) Brett Harvey	5
(Australia) Marty Beckton	Mitsubishi	Lancer Evo II	?	(Australia) Marty Beckton	(Australia) Damien Long	5
(Australia) Marty Beckton	Mitsubishi	Lancer Evo II	?	(Australia) Marty Beckton	(Australia) Craig Lee	6
(Hong Kong) Michael Lieu	Mitsubishi	Lancer Evo I	?	(Hong Kong) Michael Lieu	(Japan) Hakaru Ichino	5–6
(Japan) Mitsubishi Ralliart Zushi	Mitsubishi	Lancer Evo II	?	(Japan) Yoshihiro Kataoka	(Japan) Satoshi Hayashi	5, 8
(Australia) David West	Mitsubishi	Lancer Evo II	?	(Australia) David West	(Australia) Tony Best	6
Mitsubishi Ralliart Netherlands	Mitsubishi	Lancer Evo II	?	(Netherlands) Hans Stacey	(Netherlands) Mark van den Brand	7–8
(Sweden) MK Ratten	Mitsubishi	Galant VR-4	?	(Sweden) Anders Rådström	(Sweden) Lars-Ove Larsson	2
(Sweden) Gullabo Däckfynd	Mitsubishi	Galant VR-4	?	(Sweden) Göran Fredriksson	(Sweden) Kjell Haglund	2
(Sweden) MSK Kvarnvingarna	Mitsubishi	Galant VR-4	?	(Sweden) Pierre Andersson	(Sweden) Sven-Erik Andersson	2
(Sweden) NAF Motorsport Romerike	Mitsubishi	Galant VR-4	?	(Sweden) Anders Hedström	(Sweden) Lasse Ekström	2
(Switzerland) Philippe Camandona	Ford	Escort RS Cosworth	?	(Switzerland) Philippe Camandona	(Switzerland) Georges Crausaz	1, 3
(France) Rémi Samuel	Ford	Escort RS Cosworth	?	(France) Rémi Samuel	(France) Martin Biju-Duval	1, 4
(Monaco) Franck Phillips	Ford	Escort RS Cosworth	?	(Monaco) Franck Phillips	(France) "Slo"	1
(Germany) Uwe Nittel	Ford	Escort RS Cosworth	M	(Germany) Uwe Nittel	(Germany) Monika Eckardt	1
(France) Jacques Andreani	Ford	Escort RS Cosworth	?	(France) Jacques Andreani	(France) Jean-Pierre Cani	4
(France) Yves Loubet	Ford	Escort RS Cosworth	?	(France) Yves Loubet	(France) Bruno Brissart	4
(France) Jean-Marie Santoni	Ford	Escort RS Cosworth	?	(France) Jean-Marie Santoni	(France) Jean-Marc Casamatta	4
(United Kingdom) Jeremy Easson	Ford	Escort RS Cosworth	D	(United Kingdom) Jeremy Easson	(United Kingdom) Jim Kitson	8
(Italy) H.F. Grifone SRL	Toyota	Celica GT-Four (ST205)	M	(United Arab Emirates) Mohammed Ben Sulayem	(Republic of Ireland) Ronan Morgan	2–6
(Germany) Uwe Nittel	Toyota	Celica GT-Four (ST205)	M	(Germany) Uwe Nittel	(Germany) Monika Eckardt	3–4, 7
(Germany) Uwe Nittel	Toyota	Celica GT-Four (ST205)	M	(Germany) Uwe Nittel	(Germany) Dieter Schneppenheim	8
(Italy) H.F. Grifone SRL	Toyota	Celica GT-Four (ST205)	P	(Italy) Andrea Navarra	(Italy) Renzo Casazza	5–6
(Italy) H.F. Grifone SRL	Toyota	Celica Turbo 4WD (ST185)	P	(Italy) Andrea Navarra	(Italy) Renzo Casazza	3–4
(France) Richard Frau	Renault	Clio Williams	M	(France) Richard Frau	(France) Jean-Louis Biet	1
(France) Richard Frau	Renault	Clio Williams	M	(France) Richard Frau	(France) Nicolas Saint-Martin	4, 7
(France) Ange-Pierre Cordoliani	Renault	Clio Williams	?	(France) Ange-Pierre Cordoliani	(France) Christophe Leonardi	4
(France) Erick Antona	Renault	Clio Williams	?	(France) Erick Antona	(France) Frédéric Andreucci	4
(Spain) Escudería San Fermín	Renault	Clio Williams	?	(Spain) Javier Azcona	(Italy) Inma Vittorini	7
(Andorra) Escudería Osona	Renault	Clio Williams	?	(Andorra) Ferrán Urteu	(Andorra) Jordi Gomà	7
(Sweden) Gert Blomqvist	Nissan	Sunny GTi	?	(Sweden) Gert Blomqvist	(Sweden) Lena Lindberg	2
(Japan) Impreza IPF Fujitsubo	Subaru	Impreza WRX	?	(Japan) Masao Kamioka	(United Kingdom) Kevin Gormley	3, 5–6, 8
(Japan) Impreza IPF Fujitsubo	Subaru	Impreza WRX	?	(Japan) Hideaki Miyoshi	(United Kingdom) Mike Corner	3, 5–6
(Japan) Impreza IPF Fujitsubo	Subaru	Impreza WRX	?	(Japan) Hideaki Miyoshi	(United Kingdom) Mike Kidd	8
(France) Guy Fiori	BMW	325i E30	?	(France) Guy Fiori	(France) Mario Bastelica	4
(Malaysia) Petronas EON Racing Team	Proton	Wira 4WD	Y	(Malaysia) Karamjit Singh	(Malaysia) Ron Teoh	5–6, 8
(Spain) Catalunya Motor	SEAT	Ibiza GTi 16V	M	(Spain) Salvador Cañellas Jnr.	(Spain) Xavier Lorza	7
(Spain) Gamace MC Competición	Peugeot	106 Rallye	M	(Spain) Manuel Muniente	(Spain) Joan Ibáñez Sotos	7
(United Kingdom) Gavin Cox	Opel	Calibra Turbo 4x4	P	(United Kingdom) Gavin Cox	(United Kingdom) Stephen Griffiths	8

== Standings ==
=== Drivers' championship ===
Pos.	Driver	MON (Monaco)	SWE (Sweden)	POR (Portugal)	FRA (France)	NZL (New Zealand)	AUS (Australia)	ESP (Spain)	GBR (United Kingdom)	Points
1	(United Kingdom) Colin McRae	Ret	Ret	3	5	1	2	2	1	90
2	(Spain) Carlos Sainz	1	Ret	1	4	WD	Ret	1	2	85
3	(Sweden) Kenneth Eriksson		1			5	1		Ret	48
4	(France) François Delecour	2	Ret	Ret	2	6	Ret	4	Ret	46
5	(Finland) Tommi Mäkinen	4	2		8	Ret	4	Ret	Ret	38
6	(Belgium) Bruno Thiry	5	6	6	Ret	Ret	6	Ret	5	34
7	(Italy) Andrea Aghini	6			3			5		26
8	(Italy) Piero Liatti	8			6			3		21
9	(United Kingdom) Richard Burns			7		Ret			3	16
10	(United Kingdom) Alister McRae								4	10
11	(Portugal) Rui Madeira	12		9	18	10	Ret	11	7	7
12=	(Uruguay) Gustavo Trelles							6		6
12=	(United Kingdom) Gwyndaf Evans								6	6
14=	(France) Jean Ragnotti	7			11					4
14=	(Sweden) Stig Blomqvist		7						21	4
14=	(France) Patrick Bernardini				7					4
14=	(New Zealand) Peter 'Possum' Bourne					7	Ret			4
14=	(Japan) Yoshio Fujimoto					27	7		WD	4
14=	(Spain) Oriol Gómez							7		4
20	(Argentina) Jorge Recalde			10	20	9	10			4
21=	(Sweden) Tomas Jansson		8							3
21=	(Italy) Alex Fiorio			8						3
21=	(New Zealand) Neil Allport					8				3
21=	(Australia) Ed Ordynski					11	8			3
21=	(Italy) Andrea Navarra			17	Ret	Ret	17	8	Ret	3
21=	(Finland) Jarmo Kytölehto		14						8	3
27=	(Switzerland) Philippe Camandona	9		Ret						2
27=	(France) Philippe Bugalski	Ret			9					2
27=	(Australia) Neal Bates						9			2
27=	(Spain) Josep Bassas							9		2
27=	(Japan) Masao Kamioka			12			11		9	2
32=	(Germany) Isolde Holderied	10		11	19	Ret	19	Ret	14	1
32=	(Sweden) Kenneth Bäcklund		10							1
32=	(France) Yvan Postel	14			Ret			10		1
32=	(France) Alain Oreille								10	1
DSQ	(Finland) Juha Kankkunen	3	4	2	10	3	3	Ret		62
DSQ	(France) Didier Auriol	Ret	5	5	1	2	Ret	DSQ		51
DSQ	(Germany) Armin Schwarz	Ret	9	4	Ret	4	5	Ret		30
DSQ	(Sweden) Thomas Rådström		3							12
Pos.	Driver	MON (Monaco)	SWE (Sweden)	POR (Portugal)	FRA (France)	NZL (New Zealand)	AUS (Australia)	ESP (Spain)	GBR (United Kingdom)	Points

=== Manufacturers' championship ===
Pos.	Manufacturer	(Monaco) MON	(Sweden) SWE	(Portugal) POR	(France) FRA	(New Zealand) NZL	(Australia) AUS	(Spain) ESP	(United Kingdom) GBR	Pts
1	(Japan) 555 Subaru World Rally Team	1	Ret	1	4	1	2	1	1	350
1	(Japan) 555 Subaru World Rally Team	8	Ret	3	5	7	Ret	2	2	350
1	(Japan) 555 Subaru World Rally Team	46	0	60	39	48	29	64	64	350
2	(Japan) Team Mitsubishi Ralliart	4	1	9	3	5	1	5	7	307
2	(Japan) Team Mitsubishi Ralliart	6	2	10	8	11	4	11	Ret	307
2	(Japan) Team Mitsubishi Ralliart	36	64	32	36	31	56	33	19	307
3	(United Kingdom) R.A.S Ford	2	6	6	2	6	6	4	5	223
3	(United Kingdom) R.A.S Ford	5	7	8	7	8	Ret	Ret	Ret	223
3	(United Kingdom) R.A.S Ford	47	28	26	42	26	15	21	18	223
Pos.	Manufacturer	(Monaco) MON	(Sweden) SWE	(Portugal) POR	(France) FRA	(New Zealand) NZL	(Australia) AUS	(Spain) ESP	(United Kingdom) GBR	Pts

Key
Colour	Result
Gold	Winner
Silver	2nd place
Bronze	3rd place
Green	Points finish
Blue	Non-points finish
Blue	Non-classified finish (NC)
Purple	Did not finish (Ret)
Black	Excluded (EX)
Black	Disqualified (DSQ)
White	Did not start (DNS)
White	Cancelled (C)
Blank	Withdrew entry from the event (WD)

=== Group N Cup ===
Pos.	Driver	MON (Monaco)	SWE (Sweden)	POR (Portugal)	FRA (France)	NZL (New Zealand)	AUS (Australia)	ESP (Spain)	GBR (United Kingdom)	Points
1	(Portugal) Rui Madeira	3		1	1	2	Ret	1	1	69
2	(Argentina) Jorge Recalde			2	3	1	2	Ret		40
3	(Germany) Isolde Holderied	2		3	2		9	Ret	4	32
4	(Japan) Masao Kamioka			4			3		2	22
5	(Australia) Ed Ordynski					3	1			20
6	(Switzerland) Philippe Camandona	1		Ret						13
6	(Sweden) Kenneth Bäcklund		1							13
6	(Germany) Uwe Nittel	8		8	Ret			3	5	13
9	(Sweden) Stig-Olov Walfridsson		2							10
9	(Netherlands) Hans Stacey							2	Ret	10
9	(Malaysia) Karamjit Singh					6	5		6	10
12	(Germany) Hermann Gaßner	5		7	7				6	8
13	(Sweden) Anders Rådström		3							7
13	(Japan) Yoshihiro Kataoka								3	7
13	(United Arab Emirates) Mohammed Ben Sulayem		7	Ret	4	Ret	Ret			7
Pos.	Driver	MON (Monaco)	SWE (Sweden)	POR (Portugal)	FRA (France)	NZL (New Zealand)	AUS (Australia)	ESP (Spain)	GBR (United Kingdom)	Points

== Events ==
Rally name	Dates run	Podium drivers (finishing time)	Podium cars
(Monaco) Rallye Monte Carlo	22 January–26 January	1. (Spain) Carlos Sainz (6h:32m:31s); 2. (France) François Delecour (6h:34m:56s); 3. (Finland) Juha Kankkunen (6h:36m:28s)	1. Subaru Impreza 555; 2. Ford Escort RS Cosworth; 3. Toyota Celica GT-Four ST205
(Sweden) Swedish Rally	10 February–12 February	1. (Sweden) Kenneth Eriksson (4h:51m:27s); 2. (Finland) Tommi Mäkinen (4h:51m:39s); 3. (Sweden) Thomas Rådström (4h:52m:34s)	1. Mitsubishi Lancer Evolution II; 2. Mitsubishi Lancer Evolution II; 3. Toyota Celica GT-Four ST205
Rallye de Portugal	8 March–10 March	1. (Spain) Carlos Sainz (5h:32m:37s); 2. (Finland) Juha Kankkunen (5h:32m:49s); 3. (United Kingdom) Colin McRae (5h:35m:51s)	1. Subaru Impreza 555; 2. Toyota Celica GT-Four ST205; 3. Subaru Impreza 555
(France) Tour de Corse	3 May–5 May	1. (France) Didier Auriol (5h:14m:49s); 2. (France) François Delecour (5h:15m:04s); 3. (Italy) Andrea Aghini (5h:15m:46s)	1. Toyota Celica GT-Four ST205; 2. Ford Escort RS Cosworth; 3. Mitsubishi Lancer Evolution III
Rally New Zealand	27 July–30 July	1. (United Kingdom) Colin McRae (5h:33m:06s); 2. (France) Didier Auriol (5h:33m:50s); 3. (Finland) Juha Kankkunen (5h:34m:15s)	1. Subaru Impreza 555; 2. Toyota Celica GT-Four ST205; 3. Toyota Celica GT-Four ST205
Rally Australia	15 September–18 September	1. (Sweden) Kenneth Eriksson (4h:53m:59s); 2. (United Kingdom) Colin McRae (4h:54m:18s); 3. (Finland) Juha Kankkunen (4h:55m:54s)	1. Mitsubishi Lancer Evolution III; 2. Subaru Impreza 555; 3. Toyota Celica GT-Four ST205
(Spain) Rally Catalunya	23 October–25 October	1. (Spain) Carlos Sainz (5h:05m:58s); 2. (United Kingdom) Colin McRae (5h:06m:49s); 3. (Italy) Piero Liatti (5h:07m:56s)	1. Subaru Impreza 555; 2. Subaru Impreza 555; 3. Subaru Impreza 555
(United Kingdom) RAC Rally	19 November–22 November	1. (United Kingdom) Colin McRae (5h:09m:19s); 2. (Spain) Carlos Sainz (5h:09m:55s); 3. (United Kingdom) Richard Burns (5h:15m:58s)	1. Subaru Impreza 555; 2. Subaru Impreza 555; 3. Subaru Impreza 555
