= Toyota Celica GT-Four =

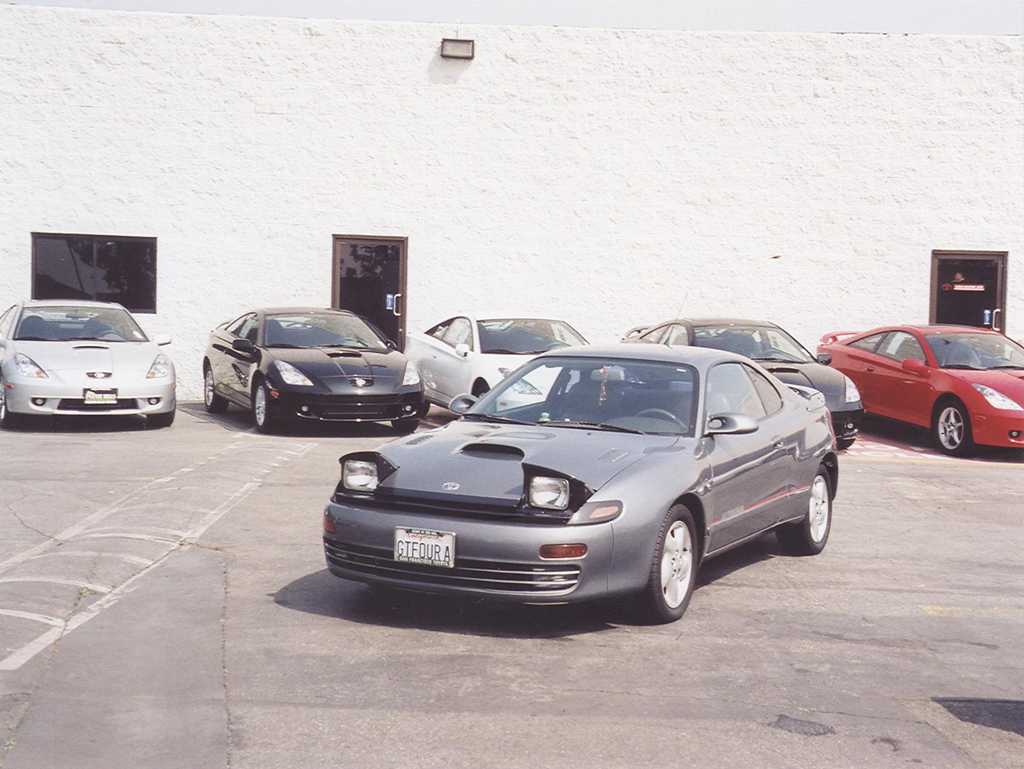
- Toyota Celica GT-Four All-Trac Turbo (ST185, US)

Overview
- Manufacturer: Toyota
- Also called: Toyota Celica All-Trac Turbo (US); Toyota Celica Turbo 4WD (Canada and some European countries)
- Production: October 1986 – June 1999
- Model years: 1986 – 1999
- Assembly: Japan: Tahara, Aichi

Body and chassis
- Class: Sports car; Rally car
- Body style: 3-door liftback coupé
- Layout: Front-engine, four-wheel-drive (All-Trac GT-Four)
- Related: Toyota Celica

The Toyota Celica GT-Four is a high performance sports car and variation of the Celica Liftback, produced from 1986 to 1999, with a turbocharged 3S-GTE engine, and full-time AWD. It was created to compete in the World Rally Championship, whose regulations dictate that a manufacturer must build road-going versions of the vehicle in sufficient numbers. These vehicles are referred to as "homologation special vehicles".

The Celica GT-Four came in three generations; the ST165, based on the fourth generation Celica, and manufactured between October 1986 and August 1989; the "super round" shape ST185 produced from September 1989 to September 1993; and the ST205, built from February 1994 to June 1999.

The Celica GT-Four production cars were built at Toyota's Tahara plant in Aichi Prefecture, Japan, and the rally cars were prepared by Toyota Team Europe in Cologne, Germany.

The Celica GT-Four ST165 made its World Rally Championship (WRC) debut in the 1988 Tour de Corse, with its first WRC victory coming in the 1989 Rally Australia. The ST185's WRC debut was in the 1992 Rally Monte Carlo, and its first WRC win was in the 1992 Safari Rally, which was one of its four victories in that year. The ST185 was Toyota's most successful rally car for more than two decades until this position was taken by Toyota Yaris WRC, and now the GR Yaris Rally1. The Celica ST185 won the WRC Drivers' Championship in 1992, and the WRC Manufacturers' and Drivers' championships in 1993 and 1994. The ST205 came in late 1994, and became the official rally car in 1995 with one WRC victory before disqualification. It also won the 1996 European Rally Championship.

The significance of the Toyota Celica GT-Four in WRC history, previously dominated by European manufacturers, is that it was the first time a Japanese car manufacturer entered the WRC with an AWD turbocharged car, took trophies and won the titles. Since then other Japanese manufacturers have been successful in the WRC. Toyota preceded the Mitsubishi (Lancer Evolution and Galant VR-4) and the Subaru (Legacy and Impreza), but not the Mazda (Mazda 323GT-R & 323GT-X). Toyota later exited the WRC to concentrate their racing efforts in Formula One, but in 2017, 11 years after the Celica was discontinued, Toyota returned to WRC with the Toyota Yaris.

Toyota Team Europe (TTE) was also the first to introduce the anti-lag system (ALS) in their Group A ST205 Celica GT-Four rally cars, a technological breakthrough that was later adopted by other teams.

== GT-Four Full-time 4WD / AWD System ==
The Celica GT-Four introduced Toyota's first performance drivetrain that powered all four wheels. Transverse layout AWD systems typically are front biased, only capable of up to 50% torque as it relies on the front axles to power the rear axles. However despite using a transverse layout for the engine and transmission, the GT-Four system cleverly used hollow splined shafts to provide power to the centre differential first to produce a true 50:50 system. The transmission's driven shaft is geared to the centre differential. Then from the centre differential, the left side gear is connected to the front differential through a short hollow shaft while the right side gear powers the rear through another hollow shaft connected to the transfer pinion. The most important piece is a driveshaft inside both hollow shafts to power the right front wheel completely isolated from the shaft powering the rear wheels.

The use of hollow shafts isolates the front power delivery and rear power delivery. They are both powered by the centre differential. This allows for a torque split capable of 100:0 to 0:100 rear bias. However to control power split, Toyota also included a viscous limited-slip coupling joining the left and right side gears of the centre differential to keep it steady at 50:50. In certain conditions such as no grip to the rear tires, one can visibly observe rear bias as only the rear tires will spin before the viscous coupling gives back some torque to the front. Early ST165's (86 and 87 models) used a vacuum-operated actuator to lock the centre differential. This would allow for full range of torque split from 100:0 to 0:100 without the centre locked, and it would be stuck at 50:50 with the centre locked and as such only recommended for off-road use.

The GT-Four system is closer to a 4WD system rather than an AWD system because it is powering 4 wheels equally at the same time and there is always a coupling keeping the fronts and rears locked. This is especially true of the early ST165, as the solid-locking centre differential cannot be used on pavement when turning without risking damaging the drivetrain.

All three generations of the Celica GT-Four used the same basic system. However, the ST185 RC and ST205 also have a rear Torsen limited-slip differential (LSD) as standard. For the regular ST185, the rear Torsen is standard or optional depending on the year and original market.

== ST165 (1986–1989) ==
ST165
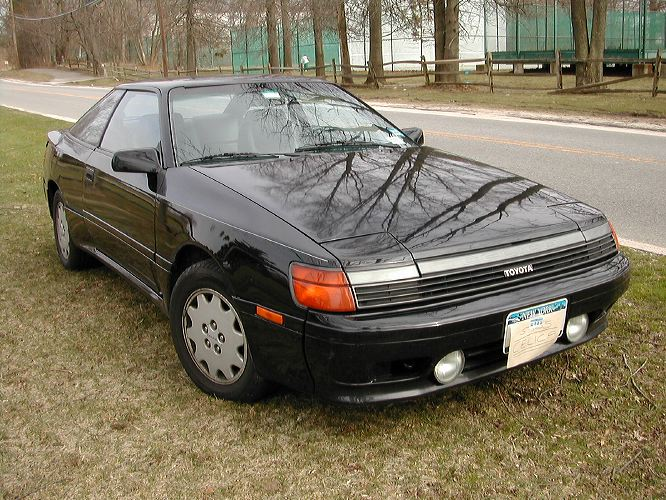
- 1988 Toyota Celica All-Trac Turbo (ST165)

Overview
- Also called: Toyota Celica All-Trac Turbo (US); Toyota Celica Turbo 4WD (Canada)
- Production: October 1986 – August 1989
- Assembly: Tahara, Aichi, Japan

Powertrain
- Engine: 2.0 L 3S-GTE turbo I4
- Transmission: 5-speed manual E50F

Dimensions
- Wheelbase: 2,525 mm (99.4 in)
- Length: 4,365 mm (171.9 in)
- Width: 1,710 mm (67.3 in)
- Height: 1,260 mm (49.8 in)
- Curb weight: 1,480 kg (3,270 lb)

The Celica GT-Four concept started with a convertible prototype displayed at 1985 Tokyo Motor Show. It was the first car to be officially called Celica GT-Four with the theme "Open Air 4WD Sport". The convertible never went into production, but the concept went to the liftback model which began production in October 1986.

The ST165 GT-Four can be distinguished from the front-wheel-drive Celica by its front bumper, which has larger openings and round fog lights on each side, and the "GT-Four" decals on the doors. Inside, the original GT-Four has a differential lock switch near the hand brake for the pre-facelift model built from October 1986 to September 1987.

The Celica GT-Four was updated in October 1987. As with other front-drive Celicas, the ST165 received a new grille, tail lights, and alloys. The export version also has ground effects, noticeably the side spoilers. The center differential was changed from a manually lockable unit (either open or locked) to a viscous-coupling limited-slip type. The GT-Four was marketed in the US as the All-Trac Turbo and in Canada as the Turbo 4WD.

The ST165 was not sold in North America before 1988 except for seventy-seven special-edition cars sold to commemorate Toyota's IMSA GTO championship win. These Celicas are all white with white wheels and blue interiors and have "IMSA GTO Champion" printed in small letters on the side moulding, as well as white stripes on the grills. One car was sold at each of the 77 Toyota dealerships in California. They were sold in 1987 as 1988 models, and have viscous-coupling center differentials.

When the Celica GT-Four was launched in the United Kingdom in March 1988 it was the first car sold in the United Kingdom designed to run only on unleaded gasoline.

The ST165 was the only car to be sold with the first version of Toyota's 3S-GTE. It developed 182–190 hp (depending on the market and model year) and 249 N⋅m (184 lb⋅ft) of torque.

== ST185 (1989–1993) ==
ST185
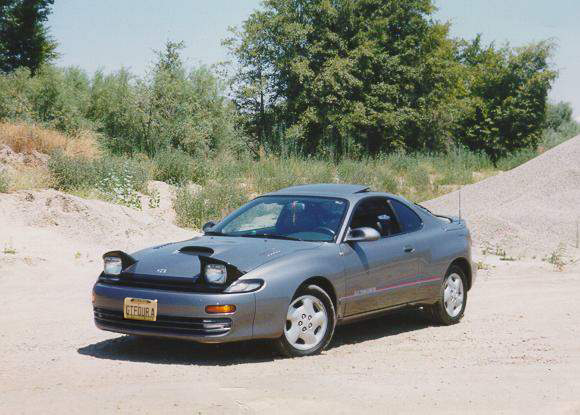
- 1993 Toyota Celica All-Trac Turbo (ST185)

Overview
- Also called: Toyota Celica All-Trac Turbo (US); Toyota Celica Turbo 4WD (Canada and various European countries)
- Production: September 1989 – September 1993
- Assembly: Aichi, Japan (Tahara plant)

Powertrain
- Engine: 2.0 L 3S-GTE turbo I4
- Transmission: 5-speed manual E150F/E151F/E152F

Dimensions
- Wheelbase: 2,525 mm (99.4 in)
- Length: 4,410–4,430 mm (174–174 in)
- Width: 1,690 mm (67 in) (normal body); 1,745 mm (68.7 in) (wide body)
- Height: 1,285–1,305 mm (50.6–51.4 in)
- Curb weight: 1,390–1,520 kg (3,060–3,350 lb) (depends on optional equipment)

The first 21 units of the Celica ST185 were built in December 1988 as prototypes for various tests. The production model was launched in Japan in September 1989, and delivery began a month later.

The 3S-GTE in the ST185 GT-Four features an air-to-air intercooler and CT26 twin entry turbo to eliminate exhaust gas interference. The Japanese market GT-Four has 225 PS (165 kW; 222 hp) of power and 224 lbf⋅ft (304 N⋅m) of torque, a result of more aggressive ignition advance and ceramic turbine. The Full-time 4WD system in the GT-Four has viscous coupling center limited-slip differential and some models are equipped with a Torsen rear differential.

All export market GT-Four are wide-body Liftback models with flared fenders. The Japanese market GT-Four was also offered as narrow body for the pre-facelift model.

In August 1990, the wide body GT-Four A was added into the Japanese lineup. It shares the same wide-body shell as the export version models. Super Live Sound System with 10 speakers became standard on the GT-Four A. ABS, automatic air conditioner, leather seats, and sunroof were optional.

Japanese market ST185 Models
Production Date	Body Style	Model Code	Model Name	Intercooler type	Base Price (¥'000)	Remarks
October 1989 – August 1991	Normal-body Liftback	E-ST185-BLMVZ	GT-Four	Air-To-Air	2,685	Optional: ABS, Auto A/C, Leather, 10-Speakers Super Live Sound System, Sunroof.
October 1989 – August 1991	Normal-body Liftback	E-ST185-BLMVZ(V)	GT-Four V	Air-To-Air	2,427	Economy model with wheel covers (no alloys), no fog lights, limited options.
October 1989 – August 1991	Normal-body Liftback	E-ST185-BLMVZ(R)	GT-Four Rally	Air-To-Air	2,385	Rally model with close ratio gearbox, steel wheels, no power window.
August 1990 – September 1993	Wide-body Liftback	E-ST185H-BLMVZ	GT-Four A	Air-To-Air	2,900 (Aug '90 launch); 2,975 (Aug '91 facelift)	Similar to all export models, equivalent to All-Trac in the US. Facelift model is simply called GT-Four.
August 1991 – September 1993	Wide-body Liftback	E-ST185H-BLMVZ(R)	GT-Four Rally	Air-To-Air	2,691	Rally model with close ratio gearbox, steel wheels, no power window. The rarest ST185 model.
August 1991 – February 1992	Wide-body Liftback	E-ST185H-BLMQZ	GT-Four RC	Water-To-Air	3,171	For WRC Group A homologation. Export version is called Carlos Sainz Limited Edition in Europe and Singapore, or Group A Rallye in Australia.

There are three different types of gearbox for the ST185 GT-Four. The E150F with 4.285 final gear ratio was installed in the regular Japanese models and All-Trac. The European and Australian specs come with E151F with 3.933 ratio. The Japanese market only GT-Four Rally has E152F with close ratio on the 1st through 4th gear and 4.285 final ratio. All the RC/Carlos Sainz/Group A Rallye have E151F.

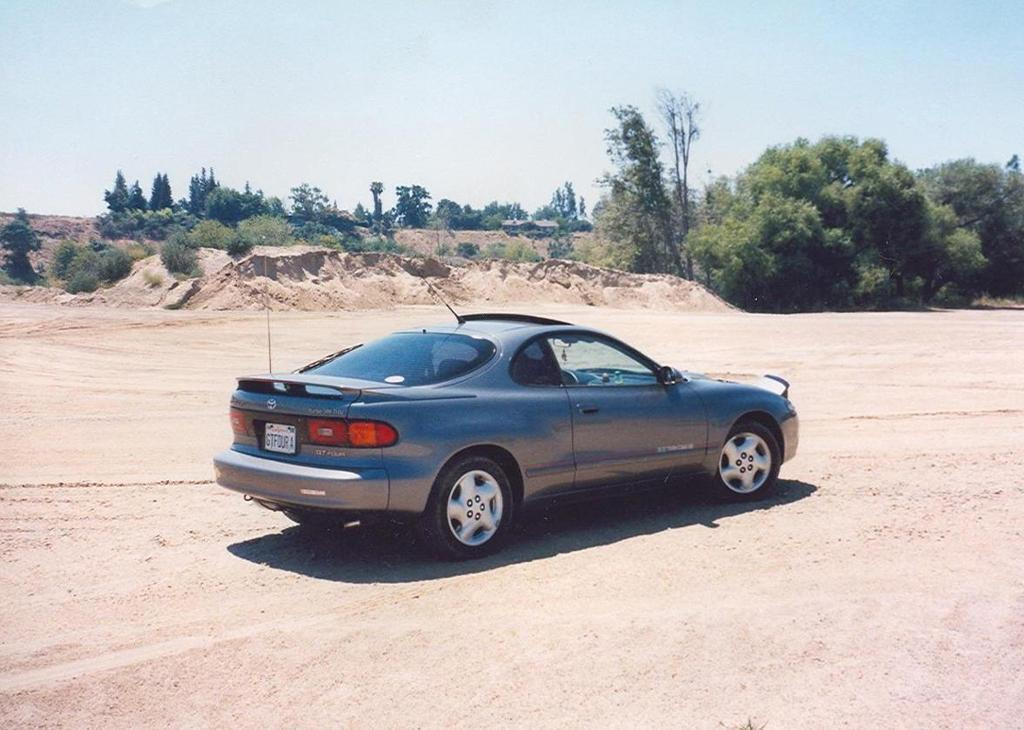
1993 Toyota Celica All-Trac Turbo (ST185, US)

Anti-lock braking system (ABS), Leather interior, Sunroof, and System 10 Premium Sound System are optional on '90–'92 All-Trac Turbo, and standard on '93 model year All-Trac Turbo. With its sport-style interior, power-operated driver's seat, auto tilt-away steering wheel, SRS Airbag, and cruise control as standard equipment, the ST185 All-Trac Turbo was the most expensive Celica yet. With a 2.0 L turbocharged 3S-GTE producing 200 hp (203 PS; 149 kW) and 200 lb⋅ft (271 N⋅m) of torque, it was the most powerful Celica ever sold in the US. In Canada, the ST185 was simply marketed as the Turbo 4WD. It was similar to the US All-Trac, but has a different lighting system with the fog lamps as Daytime Running Lights (DRL) for the compliance with local regulations.

The European versions have standard ABS and small bonnet spoiler near the windscreen. Headlight washers and heated door mirrors are also offered. Sunroof came standard in the UK models, or optional for cars in the Continent. However, System 10 Premium Sound System and Leather interior were only available as options in selected European countries, and were not offered in the UK.

The Australian spec was less luxurious than for other market. Cruise control, leather interior, sunroof, and System 10 Premium Sound System were not offered. Early models didn't have ABS and fog lights which became standard a few months after introduction.

Like other 5th generation Celicas, the GT-Four received minor changes in August 1991 for the 1992 model year. This facelift included the new Toyota ellipse emblems on the hood and trunk, restyled tail lights with smoked red frame, and shorter gear shift. The Japanese GT-Four also got round-shape front fog lights with yellow bulbs. Option packages for the Japanese market GT-Four were Cruise Control Package (Cruise Control and sunroof), SD Package (ABS, driver-side SRS Airbag, and Ultrasonic raindrop removal door mirror), and Luxury Package (10-speaker Super Live Sound System, Leather seats, and Wireless door remote control). However, the Cruise Control Package could not be combined with the SD Package. The cruise control and Ultrasonic raindrop removal door mirror could not be ordered without package. The All-Trac Turbo retained the automatic air conditioner, but the fan switch was changed from the push button type to the more conventional rotary type.

=== GT-Four RC ===
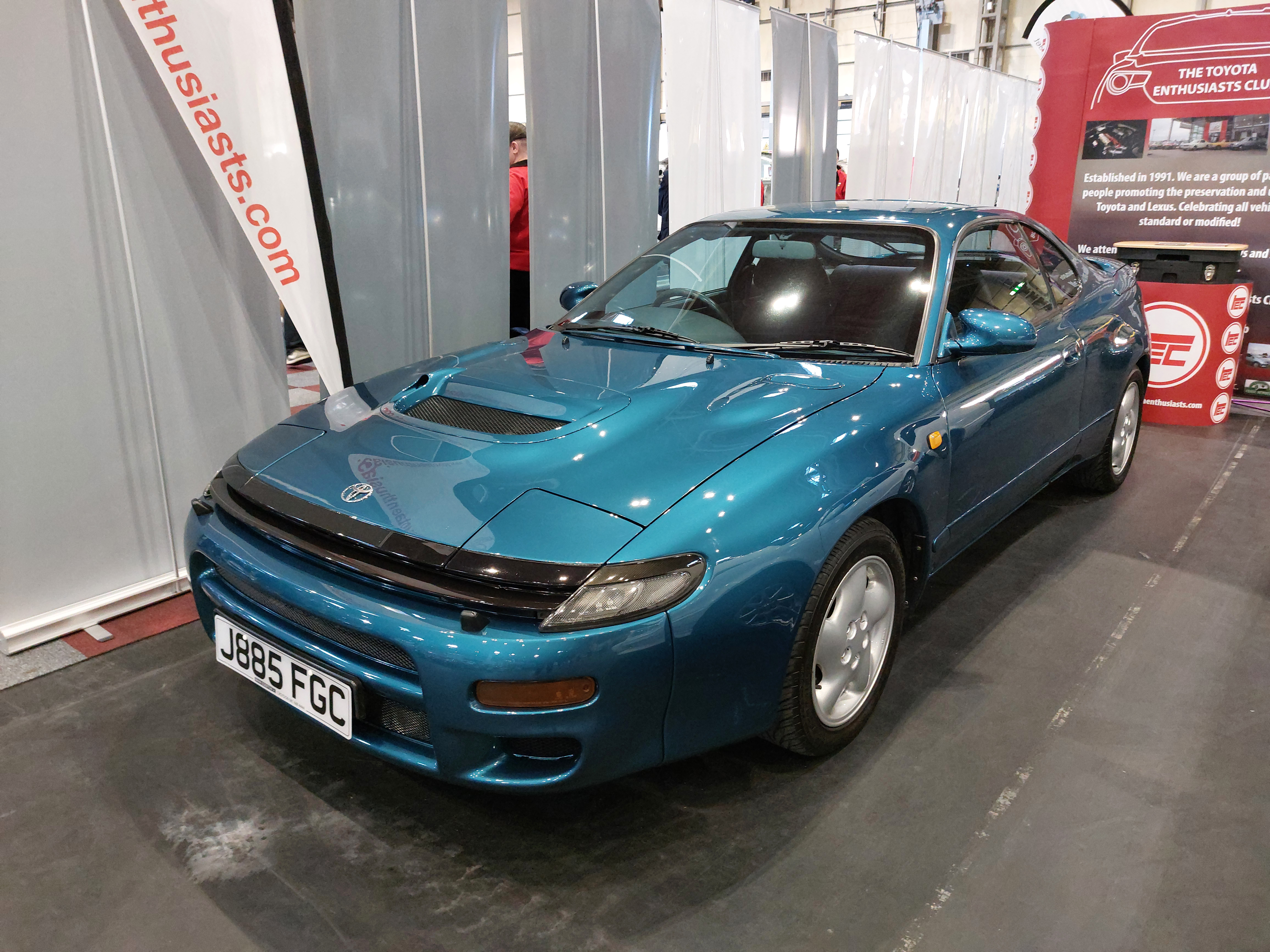
1992 Toyota Celica GT-Four Carlos Sainz Limited Edition (ST185, UK)

To meet the FIA homologation requirements for the 1992 WRC season, the GT-Four RC was launched in September 1991 for the Japanese market. The export version is known as Carlos Sainz (CS) Limited Edition in Singapore and Europe (in honour of their famous WRC driver), or Group A Rallye in Australia. Special features include:

- a water-to-air intercooler instead of the standard air-to-air unit, which was much better suited for competition use.
- different hood used to evacuate air from the engine bay rather than direct it to the intercooler (along with a small inlet duct for timing belt cooling).
- different bumper that is much lighter and has more openings than the standard one.
- shortened shift lever throw and clutch pedal travel.
- triple cone synchromesh on gears 2 and 3, up from double cone.
- a special numbered plaque on the center console.

Out of 5000 units, 1800 were for Japanese market, 3000 were allocated to Europe, 150 were delivered to Australia, 25 for Singapore, and very few made a trip to the general markets.

== ST205 (1994–1999) ==
ST205
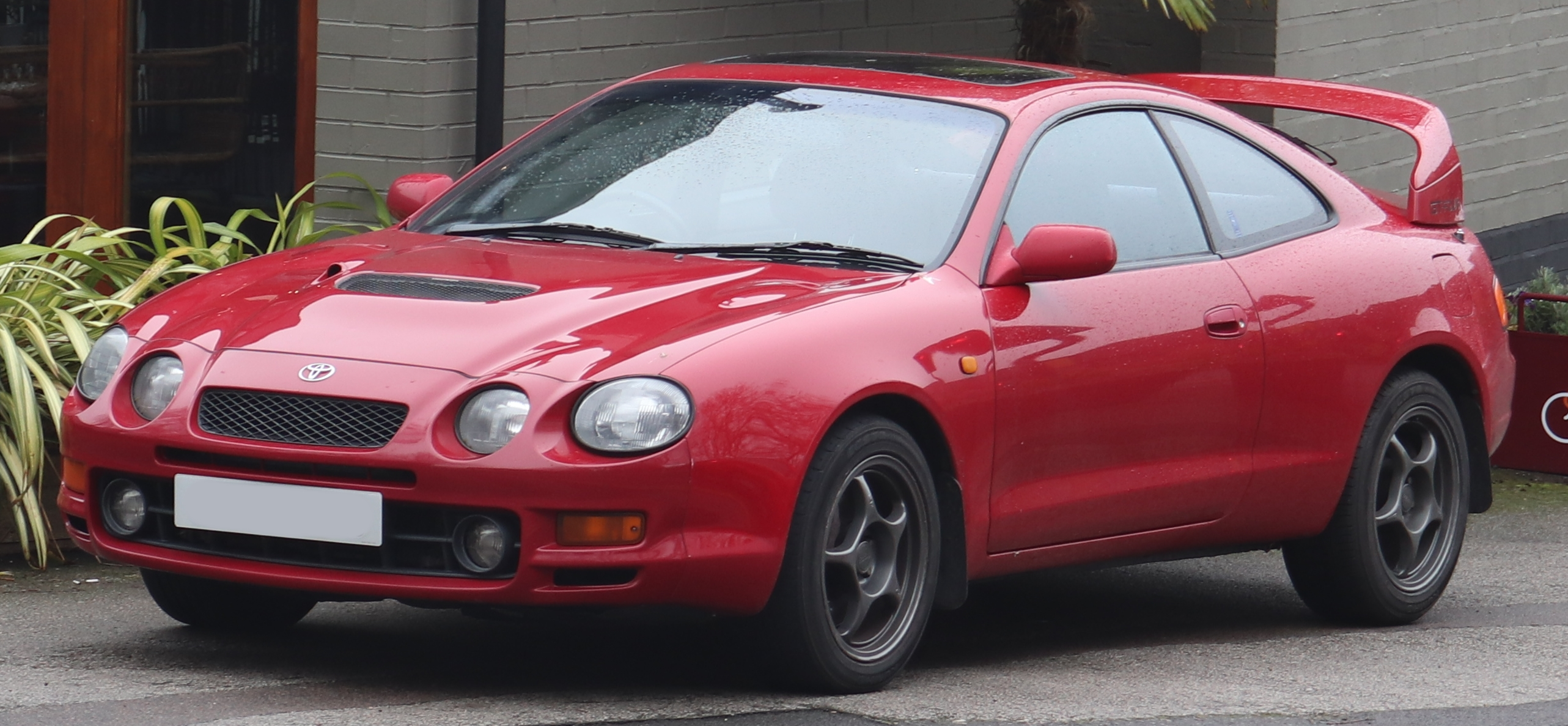
- 1994 Toyota Celica GT-Four (ST205)

Overview
- Production: February 1994 – June 1999
- Assembly: Aichi, Japan (Tahara plant)

Powertrain
- Engine: 2.0 L 3S-GTE turbo I4
- Transmission: 5-speed manual E154F

Dimensions
- Wheelbase: 2,535 mm (99.8 in)
- Length: 4,420 mm (174 in)
- Width: 1,750 mm (69 in)
- Height: 1,305 mm (51.4 in)
- Curb weight: 1,390 kg (3,064 lb)

The Celica GT-Four ST205 was launched for the Japanese market in February 1994, and for the Australian, European, and British markets in the mid-year. This version was to be the most powerful Celica produced to date, producing between 242 PS (178 kW; 239 hp) for the export model and 255 PS (188 kW; 252 hp) for the Japanese market model from an updated 3S-GTE engine matched to the E154F gearbox. Influenced strongly by Toyota Team Europe, Toyota's factory team in the World Rally Championship, the final version of the GT-Four included improvements such as an all-aluminum hood to save weight, four-channel ABS (optional for the Japanese market), an improved (enthusiast dubbed) CT20B twin entry turbocharger, and "Super Strut Suspension".

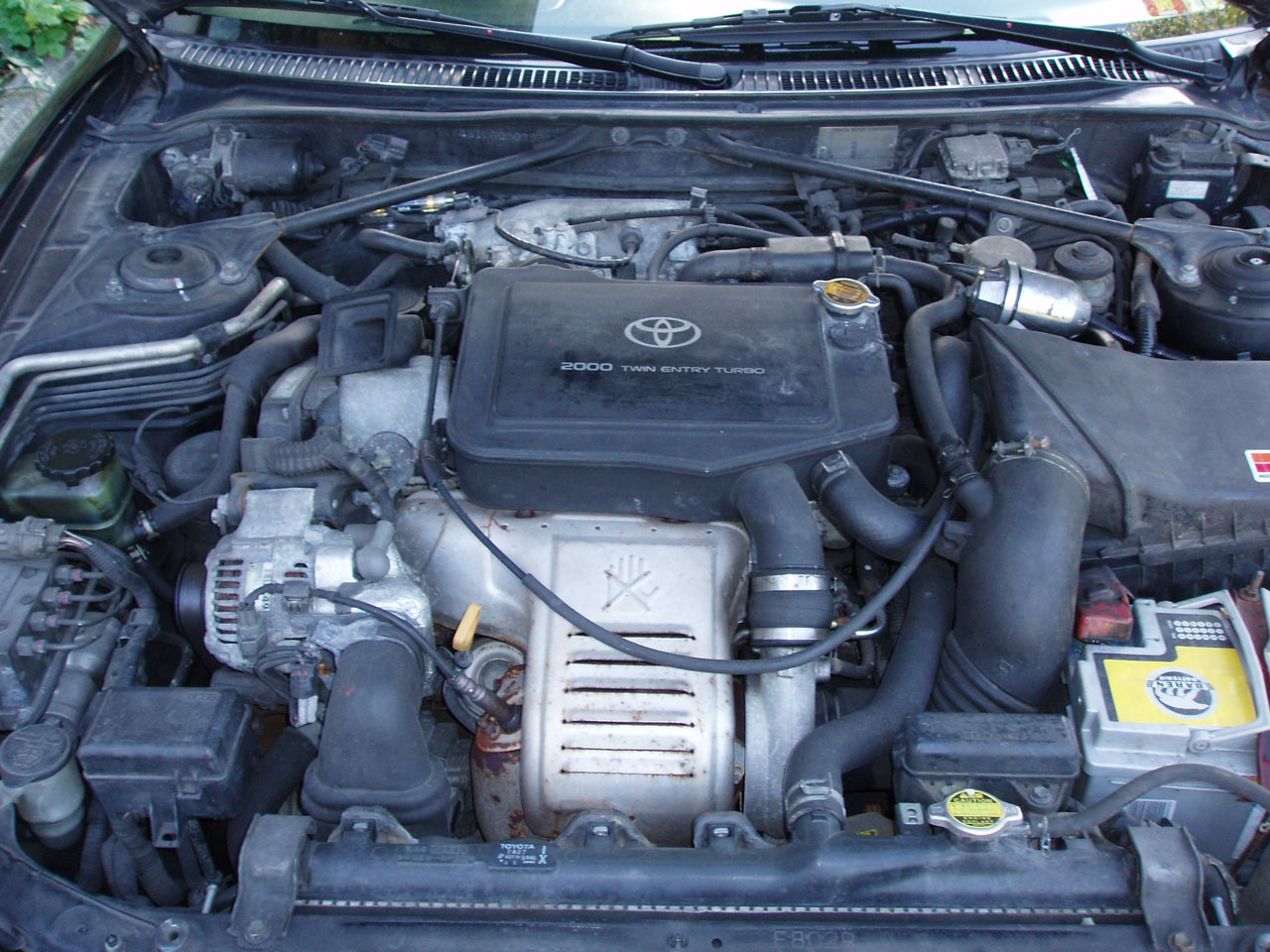
The 3S-GTE engine in a Toyota Celica GT-Four (ST205)

The 2500 units homologation cars built to allow Toyota to enter the GT-Four as a Group A car in the World Rally Championship also featured extras such as all of the plumbing required to activate an anti-lag system, a water spray bar and pump for the front intercooler, a basic water injection system, special insulation between the engine and charge cooler, a small hood-mounted spoiler aft of the windscreen washers (also standard fit on all UK cars) and a higher rear spoiler mounted on risers. Out of the 2500 GT-Four WRC built, 2100 stayed in Japan, 300 were exported to Europe, 77 for Australia, 5 for New Zealand and a few to the general markets. The Japanese market ST205 came with a standard automatic climate control air conditioner, but ABS was initially optional and became standard from August 1996. Export models only received a manual air conditioner system but all came with standard ABS.

Plaque for car number 61 of the 77 Australian GT-Four Group A Rallye

Official WRC models in the initial 2500 were only produced in 1994 as required by the WRC homologation rules. All ST205 sold in Australia were WRC models and called the GT-Four Group A Rallye. All the Australian-spec ST205 came with leather interior, and the only options were air conditioner and glass sunroof. Each of 77 cars also came with limited edition numbered plaque mounted ahead of the gear shift. Instead of using the Super Strut Suspension as found in the production cars, the actual ST205 rally cars for WRC came with standard strut suspension as they found the wear rates too high from the rigors of rallying.

In August 1995, the ST205 received facelift which consisted of new 6-spoke alloys, contoured side spoilers or rocker panels, and a redesigned rear spoiler. The Japanese model also got restyled rear combination lamps. Electric moonroof, Super Live Sound System, and Recaro SR-II seats were optional. Sport ABS and dual SRS Airbag became standard on all cars started from August 1996. The high WRC-style rear spoiler was not available for this facelift model, but returned on the second minor change in December 1997. Other new feature for the final facelift model were 3-spoke leather steering wheel with SRS Airbag and projector headlights.

During the 1995 World Rally Championship season, Toyota was caught using illegal turbo restrictor bypasses at the Rally Catalunya and were given a one-year ban by the FIA. FIA president Max Mosley called the illegal turbo restrictor "the most sophisticated device I've ever seen in 30 years of motor sports." Toyota and their drivers, Juha Kankkunen, Didier Auriol and Armin Schwarz, also had their points removed in the championships. Kankkunen was leading the Drivers Championship heading into Catalunya, while Auriol was also in the title race. Mosley stated that "there is no suggestion the drivers were aware of what was going on."

Although TTE was banned for the 1996 World Rally Championship season, the Celica ST205 still competed in 1996 and 1997 World Rally Championship season ran by private teams, most notably HF Grifone from Italy and Toyota importers in certain countries. Despite its short stay in the world championship with TTE, the ST205 was the group A car that achieved the most podiums (25.6%) and the most victories in relation to the number of competitors that started in all the rallies it took part.

== Rally results ==
=== World Rally Championship (WRC) ===
- ST165 won 13 WRC series. Carlos Sainz won the 1990 WRC Driver's Title.
- ST185 won 16 full WRC series, and 3 overall winner in the W2L series. WRC Driver's Titles with Carlos Sainz in 1992, Juha Kankkunen in 1993, and Didier Auriol in 1994. WRC Manufacturer's Titles in 1993 and 1994.
- ST205 won 1 full WRC series, and 2 overall winner in the W2L series.

WRC victories

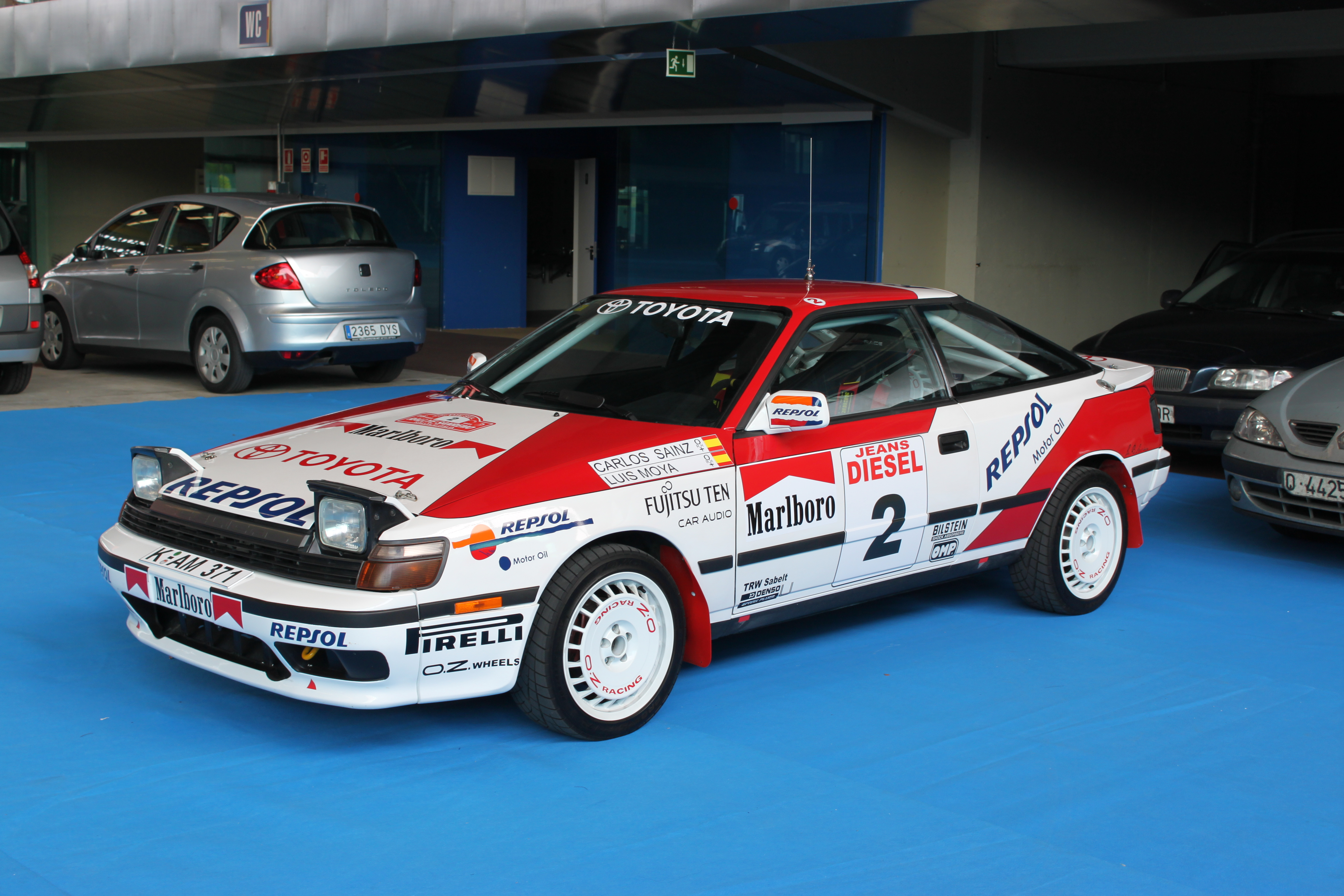
Toyota Celica GT-Four (ST165) 1991 Rally San Remo

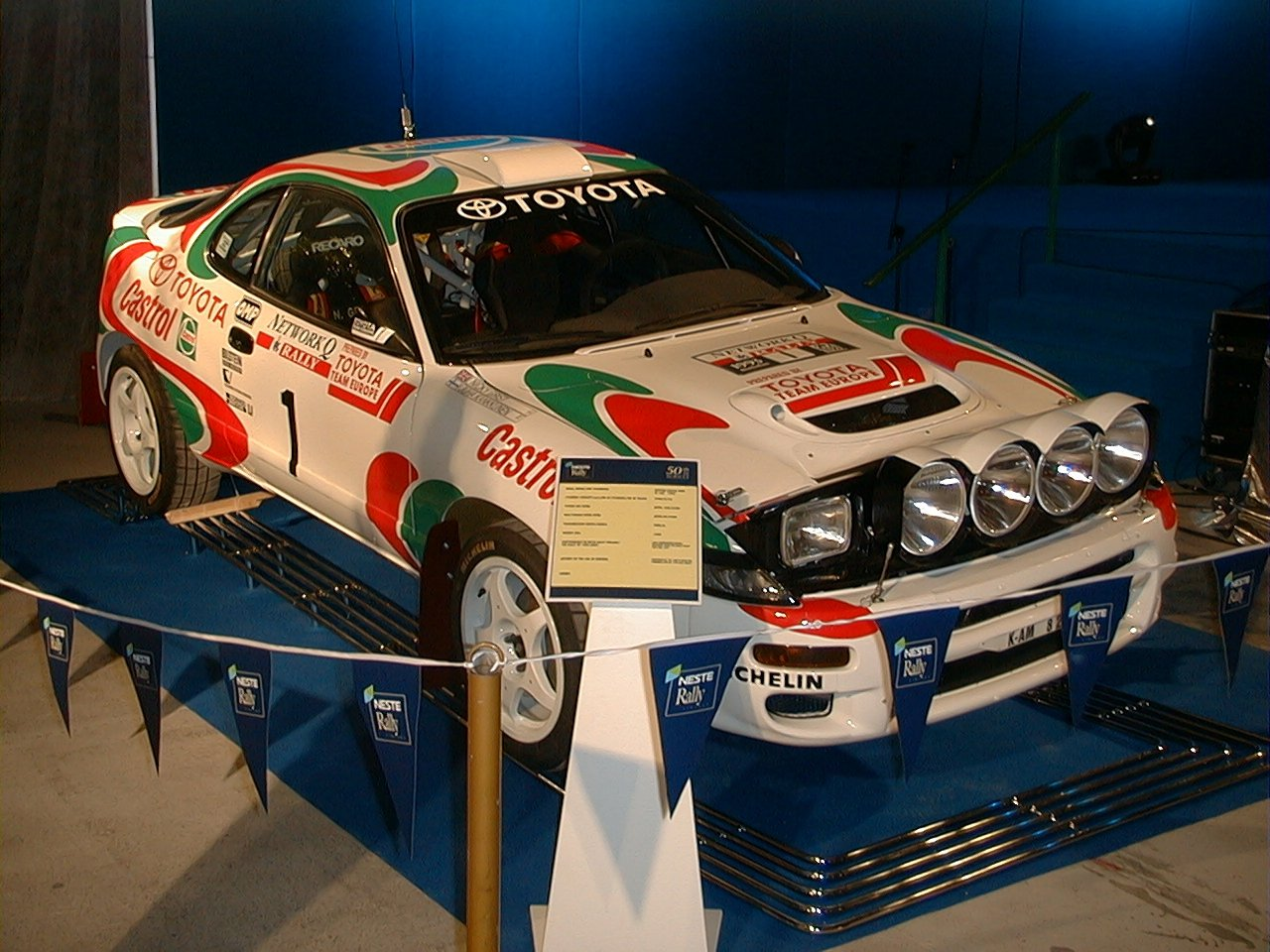
Toyota Celica GT-Four (ST185) 1993 Network Q RAC Rally GB winner

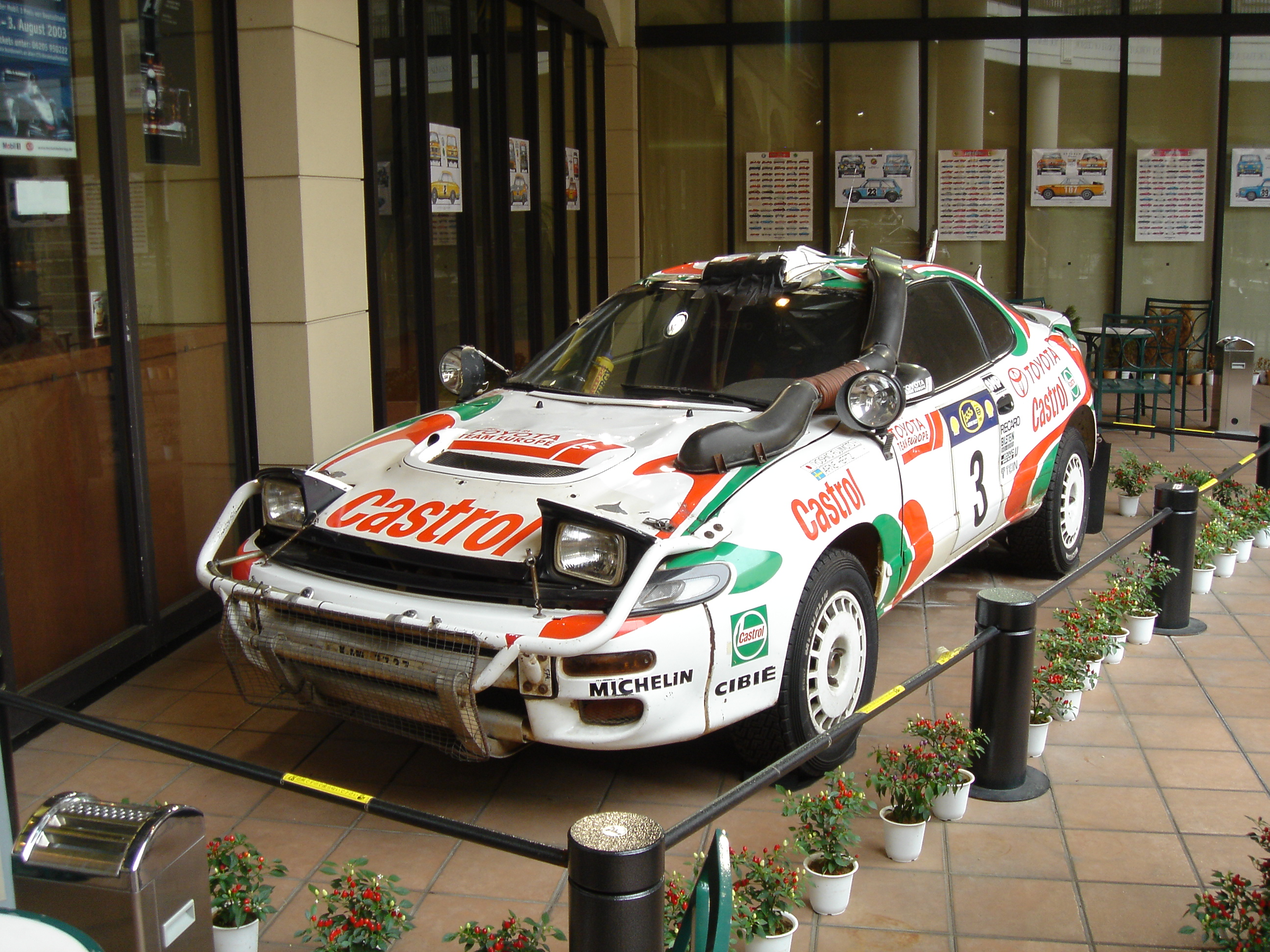
Toyota Celica GT-Four (ST185) 1995 Safari Rally winner

No.	Event	Season	Driver	Co-driver	Car
1	2nd Commonwealth Bank Rally Australia	1989	(Finland) Juha Kankkunen	(Finland) Juha Piironen	Toyota Celica GT-Four ST165
2	(Kenya) 38th Marlboro Safari Rally	1990	(Sweden) Björn Waldegård	(United Kingdom) Fred Gallagher	Toyota Celica GT-Four ST165
3	(Greece) 37th Acropolis Rally	1990	(Spain) Carlos Sainz	(Spain) Luis Moya	Toyota Celica GT-Four ST165
4	20th Rothmans Rally of New Zealand	1990	(Spain) Carlos Sainz	(Spain) Luis Moya	Toyota Celica GT-Four ST165
5	(Finland) 40th 1000 Lakes Rally	1990	(Spain) Carlos Sainz	(Spain) Luis Moya	Toyota Celica GT-Four ST165
6	(United Kingdom) 46th Lombard RAC Rally	1990	(Spain) Carlos Sainz	(Spain) Luis Moya	Toyota Celica GT-Four ST165
7	(Monaco) 59ème Rallye Automobile de Monte-Carlo	1991	(Spain) Carlos Sainz	(Spain) Luis Moya	Toyota Celica GT-Four ST165
8	25º Rallye de Portugal	1991	(Spain) Carlos Sainz	(Spain) Luis Moya	Toyota Celica GT-Four ST165
9	(France) 35ème Tour de Corse	1991	(Spain) Carlos Sainz	(Spain) Luis Moya	Toyota Celica GT-Four ST165
10	21st Rothmans Rally of New Zealand	1991	(Spain) Carlos Sainz	(Spain) Luis Moya	Toyota Celica GT-Four ST165
11	11º Rally Argentina	1991	(Spain) Carlos Sainz	(Spain) Luis Moya	Toyota Celica GT-Four ST165
12	(Spain) 27º Rallye Catalunya-Costa Brava	1991	(Germany) Armin Schwarz	(Sweden) Arne Hertz	Toyota Celica GT-Four ST165
13	(Sweden) 41st International Swedish Rally	1992	(Sweden) Mats Jonsson	(Sweden) Lars Bäckman	Toyota Celica GT-Four ST165
14	40th Martini Safari Rally Kenya	1992	(Spain) Carlos Sainz	(Spain) Luis Moya	Toyota Celica GT-Four ST185
15	22nd Rothmans Rally of New Zealand	1992	(Spain) Carlos Sainz	(Spain) Luis Moya	Toyota Celica GT-Four ST185
16	(Spain) 28º Rallye Catalunya-Costa Brava	1992	(Spain) Carlos Sainz	(Spain) Luis Moya	Toyota Celica GT-Four ST185
17	(United Kingdom) 48th Lombard RAC Rally	1992	(Spain) Carlos Sainz	(Spain) Luis Moya	Toyota Celica GT-Four ST185
18	(Monaco) 61ème Rallye Automobile de Monte-Carlo	1993	(France) Didier Auriol	(France) Bernard Occelli	Toyota Celica GT-Four ST185
19	(Sweden) 42nd International Swedish Rally	1993	(Sweden) Mats Jonsson	(Sweden) Lars Bäckman	Toyota Celica GT-Four ST185
20	(Kenya) 41st Trustbank Safari Rally	1993	(Finland) Juha Kankkunen	(Finland) Juha Piironen	Toyota Celica GT-Four ST185
21	13º Rally Argentina	1993	(Finland) Juha Kankkunen	(United Kingdom) Nicky Grist	Toyota Celica GT-Four ST185
22	(Finland) 43rd 1000 Lakes Rally	1993	(Finland) Juha Kankkunen	(France) Denis Giraudet	Toyota Celica GT-Four ST185
23	6th Telecom Rally Australia	1993	(Finland) Juha Kankkunen	(United Kingdom) Nicky Grist	Toyota Celica GT-Four ST185
24	(United Kingdom) 49th Network Q RAC Rally	1993	(Finland) Juha Kankkunen	(United Kingdom) Nicky Grist	Toyota Celica GT-Four ST185
25	28º TAP Rallye de Portugal	1994	(Finland) Juha Kankkunen	(United Kingdom) Nicky Grist	Toyota Celica GT-Four ST185
26	(Kenya) 42nd Trustbank Safari Rally	1994	(Kenya) Ian Duncan	(Kenya) David Williamson	Toyota Celica GT-Four ST185
27	(France) 38ème Tour de Corse	1994	(France) Didier Auriol	(France) Bernard Occelli	Toyota Celica GT-Four ST185
28	14º Rally Argentina	1994	(France) Didier Auriol	(France) Bernard Occelli	Toyota Celica GT-Four ST185
29	(Italy) 36º Rallye Sanremo	1994	(France) Didier Auriol	(France) Bernard Occelli	Toyota Celica GT-Four ST185
30	(France) 39ème Tour de Corse	1995	(France) Didier Auriol	(France) Denis Giraudet	Toyota Celica GT-Four ST205

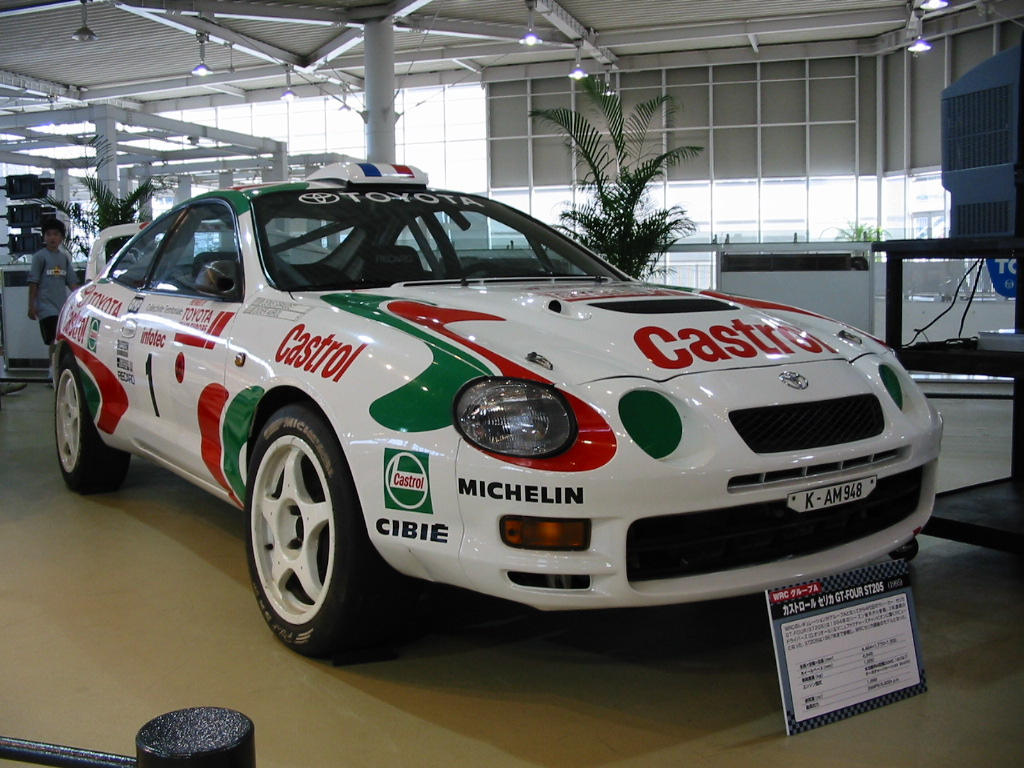
Toyota Celica GT-Four (ST205) 1995 Tour de Corse winner

Overall Winner in the W2L Series

No.	Event	Season	Driver	Co-driver	Car
1	(Sweden) 43rd International Swedish Rally	1994	(Sweden) Thomas Rådström	(Sweden) Lars Bäckman	Toyota Celica GT-Four ST185
2	(Spain) 30º Rallye Catalunya-Costa Brava	1994	(Italy) Enrico Bertone	(Italy) Massimo Chiapponi	Toyota Celica GT-Four ST185
3	(Kenya) 43rd 555 Safari Rally	1995	(Japan) Yoshio Fujimoto	(Sweden) Arne Hertz	Toyota Celica GT-Four ST185
4	30º TAP Rallye de Portugal	1996	(Portugal) Rui Madeira	(Portugal) Nuno da Silva	Toyota Celica GT-Four ST205
5	(United Kingdom) 52nd Network Q RAC Rally	1996	(Germany) Armin Schwarz	(France) Denis Giraudet	Toyota Celica GT-Four ST205

=== Other important rallies ===
- ST165 won the 1989 and 1990 British Rally Championship, and 1990 Asia Pacific Rally Championship.
- ST185 won the 1995 European Rally Championship.
- ST185 won the 1997 Rally of Malaysia, driven by Yoshio Fujimoto and co-driver Arne Hertz.
- ST205 won the 1996 European Rally Championship and together with the Corolla WRC won the 1998 FIA Teams Cup for the HF Grifone Team.
- ST205 won the 1996 Manx International Rally, driven by Armin Schwarz and co-driver Denis Giraudet, driving for Toyota Castrol Team.

WRC Celica ST185 GT-Four

WRC Celica ST205 GT-Four
