= List of Group A cars =

This is a list of cars homologated in the FIA's Group A of Appendix J.

== Cars ==
| Manufacturer | Model | Image | Application |
|---|---|---|---|
| (Italy) Abarth | Grande Punto S2000 | | Rally |
| (Italy) Alfa-Romeo | 33 | | Touring Car |
| (Italy) Alfa-Romeo | 75 | | Touring Car |
| (Italy) Alfa-Romeo | Alfasud | | Touring Car |
| (Italy) Alfa-Romeo | Alfetta GTV and GTV/6 | | Touring Car |
| (Italy) Alfa-Romeo | Alfetta GTV and GTV/6 | | Rally |
| (United States) AMC | AMC Spirit | | Touring Car |
| (Germany) Audi | 80 | | Touring Car |
| (Germany) Audi | Audi S2 quattro | | Rally |
| (Germany) Audi | Coupé GT5E | | Rally |
| (Germany) Audi | Audi V8 | | Touring Car |
| (United Kingdom) Austin | Metro | | Touring Car |
| (Germany) BMW | 323i/325i (E30) | | Touring Car |
| (Germany) BMW | 318i/320i/325i (E36) | | Touring Car |
| (Germany) BMW | 528i (E28) | | Touring Car |
| (Germany) BMW | 635 CSi | | Touring Car |
| (Germany) BMW | M3/Evolution (E30) | | Touring Car |
| (Germany) BMW | M3 (E36) | | Touring Car |
| (United States) Chevrolet | Camaro IROC-Z/Z28 | | Touring Car |
| (United States) Dodge | Daytona Shelby Z | | Touring Car |
| (Italy) Fiat | Uno | | Rally |
| (Italy) Fiat | Punto S1600 | | Rally |
| (United States) Ford | Capri | | Touring Car |
| (United States) Ford | Falcon XE | | Touring Car |
| (United States) Ford | Ford Escort RS 1600i | | Touring Car |
| (United States) Ford | Escort RS Cosworth | | Rally |
| (United States) Ford | Escort RS Turbo | | Touring Car |
| (United States) Ford | Mustang GT | | Touring Car |
| (United States) Ford | Ford Sierra RS/RS500 Cosworth | | Touring Car |
| (United States) Ford | Sierra RS/RS500 Cosworth | | Rally |
| (United States) Ford | Sierra XR4Ti | | Touring Car |
| (United States) Ford | Sierra XR4i | | Touring Car |
| (United States) Ford | Sierra XR4i | | Rally |
| (Poland) FSO | Polonez 1.5C Turbo "Iron Rain" | | Touring Car |
| (Poland) FSO | Polonez 1.6C "Gravel Champion" | | Touring Car |
| (Australia) Holden | VK Commodore SS/Group A | | Touring Car |
| (Australia) Holden | VL Commodore SS Group A/SV | | Touring Car |
| (Australia) Holden | VN Commodore SS Group A SV | | Touring Car |
| (Australia) Holden | Gemini | | Touring Car |
| (Japan) Honda | Civic Si (AU) | | Touring Car |
| (Japan) Honda | Civic SiR (EF9) | | Touring Car |
| (Japan) Honda | Civic SiR and SiR-II (EG6) | | Touring Car |
| (United Kingdom) Jaguar | XJS | | Touring Car |
| (Russia) Lada | 2107 | | Rally |
| (Italy) Lancia | Delta HF 4WD | | Rally |
| (Italy) Lancia | Delta HF Integrale 8v | | Rally |
| (Italy) Lancia | Delta HF Integrale 16v | | Rally |
| (Italy) Lancia | Delta HF Integrale Evoluzione | | Rally |
| (Italy) Lancia | Delta Integrale | | Rally |
| (Italy) Maserati | Biturbo | | Touring Car |
| (Japan) Mazda | 323 GTX/GT-R | | Rally |
| (Japan) Mazda | 929 | | Touring Car |
| (Japan) Mazda | RX-7 (FB) | | Touring Car |
| (Germany) Mercedes-Benz | 190E 2.3-16/Evolution/Evolution II | | Touring Car |
| (Germany) Mercedes-Benz | 190E 2.3-16/Evolution/Evolution II | | Rally |
| (United Kingdom) MG | MG Maestro 1600 | | Touring Car |
| (United Kingdom) MG | MG Maestro 2.0 EFi | | Touring Car |
| (Japan) Mitsubishi | Carisma GT Evolution IV-VI | | Rally |
| (Japan) Mitsubishi | Galant VR-4 | | Rally |
| (Japan) Mitsubishi | Lancer Evolution I – X | | Rally |
| (Japan) Mitsubishi | Starion | | Touring Car |
| (Japan) Mitsubishi | Starion | | Rally |
| (Japan) Nissan | Gazelle | | Touring Car |
| (Japan) Nissan | Pulsar EN13 | | Touring Car |
| (Japan) Nissan | Pulsar GTI-R | | Rally |
| (Japan) Nissan | Silvia 200SX | | Rally |
| (Japan) Nissan | Skyline DR30 RS | | Touring Car |
| (Japan) Nissan | Skyline RS-X | | Touring Car |
| (Japan) Nissan | Skyline HR31 GTS-R | | Touring Car |
| (Japan) Nissan | Skyline GT-R (R32) | | Touring Car |
| (Japan) Nissan | Skyline GT-R NISMO (R32) | | Touring Car |
| (Germany) Opel | Ascona | | Rally |
| (Germany) Opel | Calibra | | Touring Car |
| (Germany) Opel | Kadett GSi | | Rally |
| (Germany) Opel | Monza 3.0E | | Touring Car |
| (Germany) Opel | Omega | | Touring Car |
| (France) Peugeot | 206 GTi/RC (GTI 180) | | Rally |
| (France) Peugeot | 306 Maxi | | Rally |
| (United Kingdom) Rover | SD1 3500/Vitesse | | Touring Car |
| (France) Renault | 11 Turbo | | Rally |
| (Sweden) Saab | 99 Turbo | | Rally |
| (Czech Republic) Skoda | Favorit | | Rally |
| (Japan) Subaru | RX Turbo | | Rally |
| (Japan) Subaru | Impreza 555 | | Rally |
| (Japan) Subaru | Impreza WRX | | Rally |
| (Japan) Subaru | Impreza WRX STI | | Rally |
| (Japan) Subaru | Legacy | | Rally |
| (Japan) Subaru | Legacy RS | | Rally |
| (Japan) Subaru | Vivio | | Rally |
| (United Kingdom) Talbot | Sunbeam TI | | Rally |
| (Japan) Toyota | Celica GT-Four (ST165) | | Rally |
| (Japan) Toyota | Celica GT-Four (ST185) | | Rally |
| (Japan) Toyota | Celica GT-Four (ST205) | | Rally |
| (Japan) Toyota | Celica Supra | | Touring Car |
| (Japan) Toyota | Corolla FX AE82 | | Touring Car |
| (Japan) Toyota | Corolla AE86 | | Touring Car |
| (Japan) Toyota | Corolla AE92 | | Touring Car |
| (Japan) Toyota | Corolla AE101 | | Touring Car |
| (Japan) Toyota | Celica ST162 | | Touring Car |
| (Japan) Toyota | Supra | | Touring Car |
| (Japan) Toyota | Supra Turbo A | | Touring Car |
| (Germany) Trabant | 800 RS | | Rally |
| (United Kingdom) Vauxhall | Astra GTE | | Touring Car |
| (Sweden) Volvo | 240T | | Touring Car |
| (Sweden) Volvo | 360 | | Touring Car |
| (Germany) Volkswagen | Golf GTI | | Rally |
| (Germany) Volkswagen | Scirocco | | Touring Car |

== See also ==
- Group A
  - Group R
  - World Rally Car
  - Super 1600
  - Super 2000
- Group B
- Group C
- Group N
