= List of World Rally Championship Co-Drivers' champions =

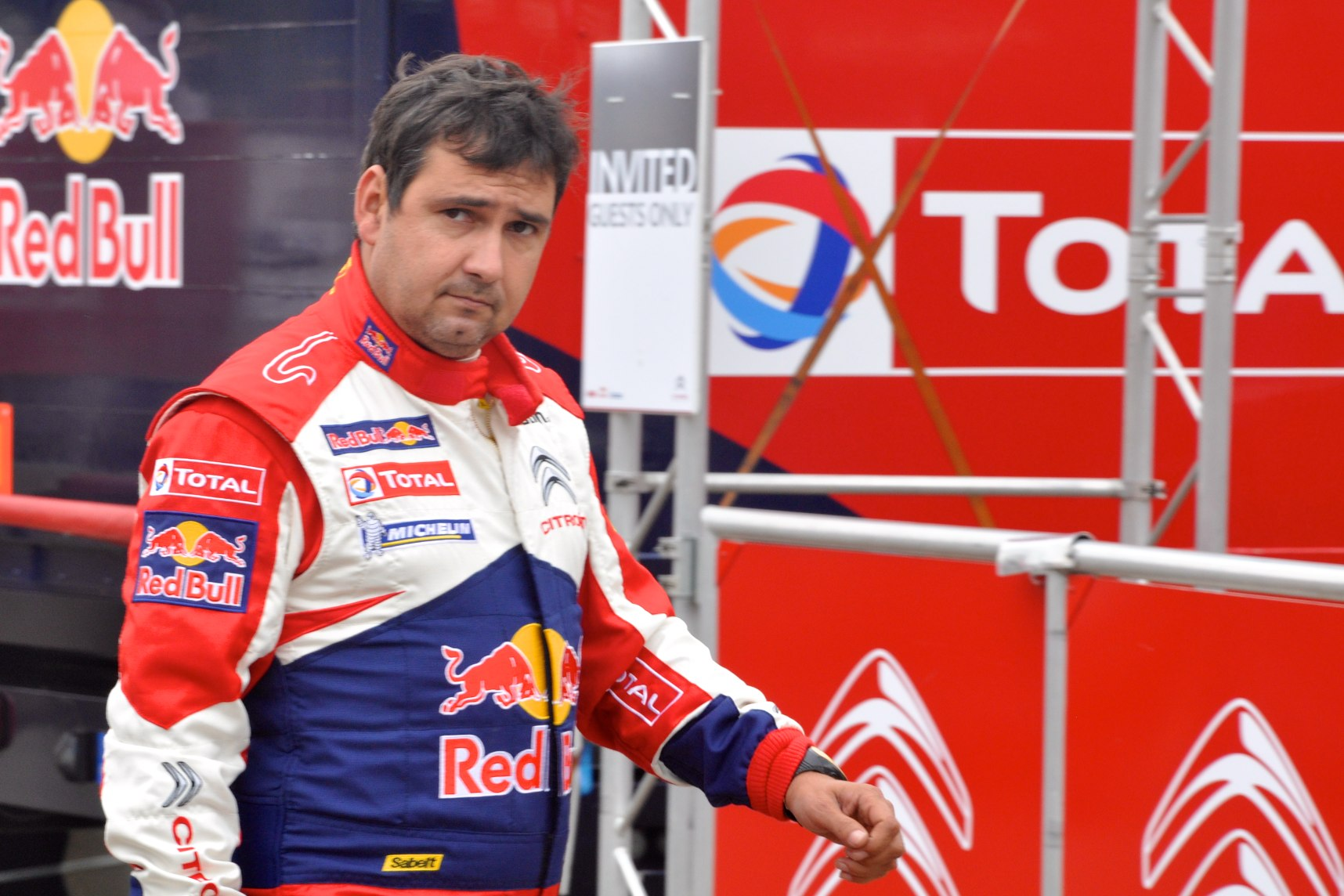
Daniel Elena is the most successful WRC co-driver champion, winning 9 times with driver Sébastien Loeb.

The World Rally Championship (WRC) is a rallying series administered by Fédération Internationale de l'Automobile (FIA), motorsport's world governing body. The WRC was first contested in 1973 though only awarded championship titles to manufacturers to begin with. In 1977 the FIA Cup for Drivers began before being replaced in 1979 with the World Rally Championship for Drivers. There is no official FIA online publication of co-driver champions or when the title was introduced, but according to the printed FIA Yearbooks of Automobile Sport (the official FIA archives of motorsport), the first recorded co-driver world title was awarded in 1982 to Christian Geistdörfer who ran with the driver champion Walter Röhrl that year. The archives of WRC.com had recorded co-driver world champions from 2001, however this page is no longer maintained by WRC.com. eWRC-Results.com, a popular rally results archive has co-driver standings from 1998 onwards on its 'Seasons' pages. The website Juwra.com holds a record of WRC sporting regulations from 2004 and there are references at least to a co-driver championship title from that year. Because of this lack of forthcoming information from either of the official sources FIA or WRC it is not unusual to see conflicting information about who is a champion or not. For example, Nicky Grist may mistakenly be called a co-driver champion for sitting with driver champion Juha Kankkunnen in 1993, however he did not do all the rallies and was outscored by Daniel Grataloup, the official co-driver champion as recorded by the FIA Yearbooks. Some co-drivers may be called champions in years prior to 1982 too, technically speaking they are celebrated as such unofficially. The list below includes these co-drivers, using point scoring systems copied from the drivers championship (or cup from 1977 to 1978).

The driver's and co-driver's championships are separate championships but follow the same structure for accruing points. Since 2010 points are awarded at the end of each rally to the top ten WRC (overall) drivers and co-drivers that qualify as follows: 25, 18, 15, 12, 10, 8, 6, 4, 2, 1. In addition to those points, from 2011 each event holds 1 special stage, the Power Stage, in which drivers and co-drivers can score extra points – currently awarded to five fastest (5, 4, 3, 2, 1). In previous years the points awarded for overall classification has ranged from between 9 and 25 points for a win and having points awarded to the top 6, 8, 10 or even 15 crews. This makes comparing results across years difficult.

Daniel Elena holds the record for the most co-drivers' championships, winning nine during his career. He also holds the record for the most championships won in a row; he won nine consecutive titles from 2004 to 2012. Julien Ingrassia is second, with eight championships won between 2013 and 2021.

== List of co-drivers' champions ==
=== By year ===
List of World Rally Championship Co-Drivers' champions
Season	Country	Co-Driver	Car	Wins	Podiums	Notes
1977	Italy	Pierro Sodano	Lancia Stratos HF	3	4	FIA Cup for Drivers
1978	Finland	Ilkka Kivimäki	Lancia Stratos HF / Fiat 131 Abarth	3	7	FIA Cup for Drivers
1979	Sweden	Hans Thorszelius	Mercedes-Benz 450 SL / Ford Escort RS1800	2	6	First World Rally Championship for Drivers
1980	West Germany	Christian Geistdörfer	Fiat 131 Abarth	4	6	
1981	United Kingdom	David Richards	Ford Escort RS1800	3	5	
1982	West Germany	Christian Geistdörfer	Opel Ascona 400	2	8	First officially recorded Co-Driver title awarded
1983	Sweden	Arne Hertz	Audi Quattro A1 / Audi Quattro A2	4	7	
1984	Sweden	Björn Cederberg	Audi Quattro A2	5	6	
1985	Finland	Seppo Harjanne	Peugeot 205 Turbo 16	5	8	
1986	Finland	Juha Piironen	Peugeot 205 Turbo 16 E2	3	6	
1987	Finland	Juha Piironen	Lancia Delta HF 4WD	2	5	
1988	Italy	Tiziano Siviero	Lancia Delta Integrale	5	6	
1989	Italy	Tiziano Siviero	Lancia Delta Integrale	5	5	
1990	Spain	Luis Moya	Toyota Celica GT-4 (ST165)	4	9	
1991	Finland	Juha Piironen	Lancia Delta Integrale 16V	5	7	
1992	Spain	Luis Moya	Toyota Celica Turbo 4WD (ST185)	4	8	
1993	France	Daniel Grataloup	Ford Escort RS Cosworth	3	6	Only instance of champion drivers and co-drivers from different crews
1994	France	Bernard Occelli	Toyota Celica Turbo 4WD (ST185)	3	6	
1995	United Kingdom	Derek Ringer	Subaru Impreza 555	2	5	
1996	Finland	Seppo Harjanne	Mitsubishi Lancer Evo III	5	6	Only Co-driver to have won championships with different drivers
1997	Finland	Seppo Harjanne	Mitsubishi Lancer Evo IV	4	9	
1998	Finland	Risto Mannisenmäki	Mitsubishi Lancer Evo V	5	7	
1999	Finland	Risto Mannisenmäki	Mitsubishi Lancer Evo VI	4	7	
2000	Finland	Timo Rautiainen	Peugeot 206 WRC	4	7	
2001	United Kingdom	Robert Reid	Subaru Impreza WRC	1	6	
2002	Finland	Timo Rautiainen	Peugeot 206 WRC	5	9	
2003	United Kingdom	Phil Mills	Subaru Impreza WRC 2003	4	7	
2004	Monaco	Daniel Elena	Citroën Xsara WRC	6	12	
2005	Monaco	Daniel Elena	Citroën Xsara WRC	10	13	
2006	Monaco	Daniel Elena	Citroën Xsara WRC	8	12	
2007	Monaco	Daniel Elena	Citroën C4 WRC	8	13	
2008	Monaco	Daniel Elena	Citroën C4 WRC	11	13	
2009	Monaco	Daniel Elena	Citroën C4 WRC	7	9	
2010	Monaco	Daniel Elena	Citroën C4 WRC	8	13	
2011	Monaco	Daniel Elena	Citroën DS3 WRC	5	9	
2012	Monaco	Daniel Elena	Citroën DS3 WRC	9	10	
2013	France	Julien Ingrassia	Volkswagen Polo R WRC	9	11	
2014	France	Julien Ingrassia	Volkswagen Polo R WRC	8	10	
2015	France	Julien Ingrassia	Volkswagen Polo R WRC	8	10	
2016	France	Julien Ingrassia	Volkswagen Polo R WRC	6	11	
2017	France	Julien Ingrassia	Ford Fiesta WRC	2	9	
2018	France	Julien Ingrassia	Ford Fiesta WRC	4	6	
2019	Estonia	Martin Järveoja	Toyota Yaris WRC	6	9	
2020	France	Julien Ingrassia	Toyota Yaris WRC	2	5	
2021	France	Julien Ingrassia	Toyota Yaris WRC	5	7	
2022	Finland	Jonne Halttunen	Toyota GR Yaris Rally1	5	7	
2023	Finland	Jonne Halttunen	Toyota GR Yaris Rally1	3	8	
2024	Belgium	Martijn Wydaeghe	Hyundai i20 N Rally1	2	6	
2025	France	Vincent Landais	Toyota GR Yaris Rally1	6	4	
2026	United Kingdom	Scott Martin	Toyota GR Yaris Rally1	2	4	

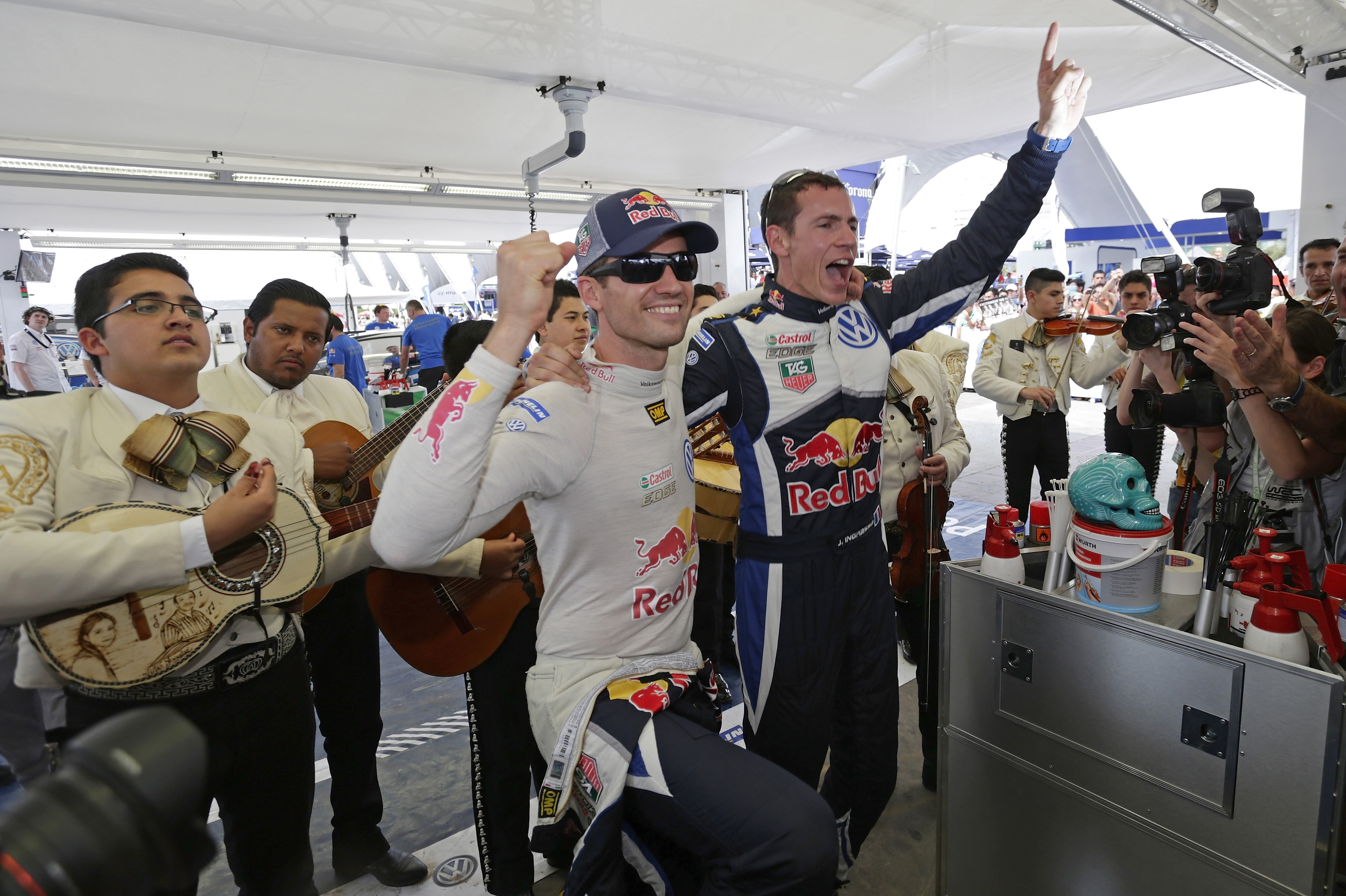
Julien Ingrassia has won eight titles, all with Sébastien Ogier.

* Season still in progress.

=== By co-driver ===
List of World Rally Championship Co-Drivers' Champions by co-driver
Co-Driver	Total	Seasons
(Monaco) Daniel Elena	9	2004, 2005, 2006, 2007, 2008, 2009, 2010, 2011, 2012
(France) Julien Ingrassia	8	2013, 2014, 2015, 2016, 2017, 2018, 2020, 2021
(Finland) Juha Piironen	3	1986, 1987, 1991
(Finland) Seppo Harjanne	3	1985, 1996, 1997
(Germany) Christian Geistdörfer	2	1980, 1982
(Italy) Tiziano Siviero	2	1988, 1989
(Spain) Luis Moya	2	1990, 1992
(Finland) Risto Mannisenmäki	2	1998, 1999
(Finland) Timo Rautiainen	2	2000, 2002
(Finland) Jonne Halttunen	2	2022, 2023
(Italy) Pierro Sodano	1	1977
(Finland) Ilkka Kivimäki	1	1978
(Sweden) Hans Thorszelius	1	1979
(United Kingdom) David Richards	1	1981
(Sweden) Arne Hertz	1	1983
(Sweden) Björn Cederberg	1	1984
(France) Daniel Grataloup	1	1993
(France) Bernard Occelli	1	1994
(United Kingdom) Derek Ringer	1	1995
(United Kingdom) Robert Reid	1	2001
(United Kingdom) Phil Mills	1	2003
(Estonia) Martin Järveoja	1	2019
(Belgium) Martijn Wydaeghe	1	2024
(United Kingdom) Scott Martin	1	2026

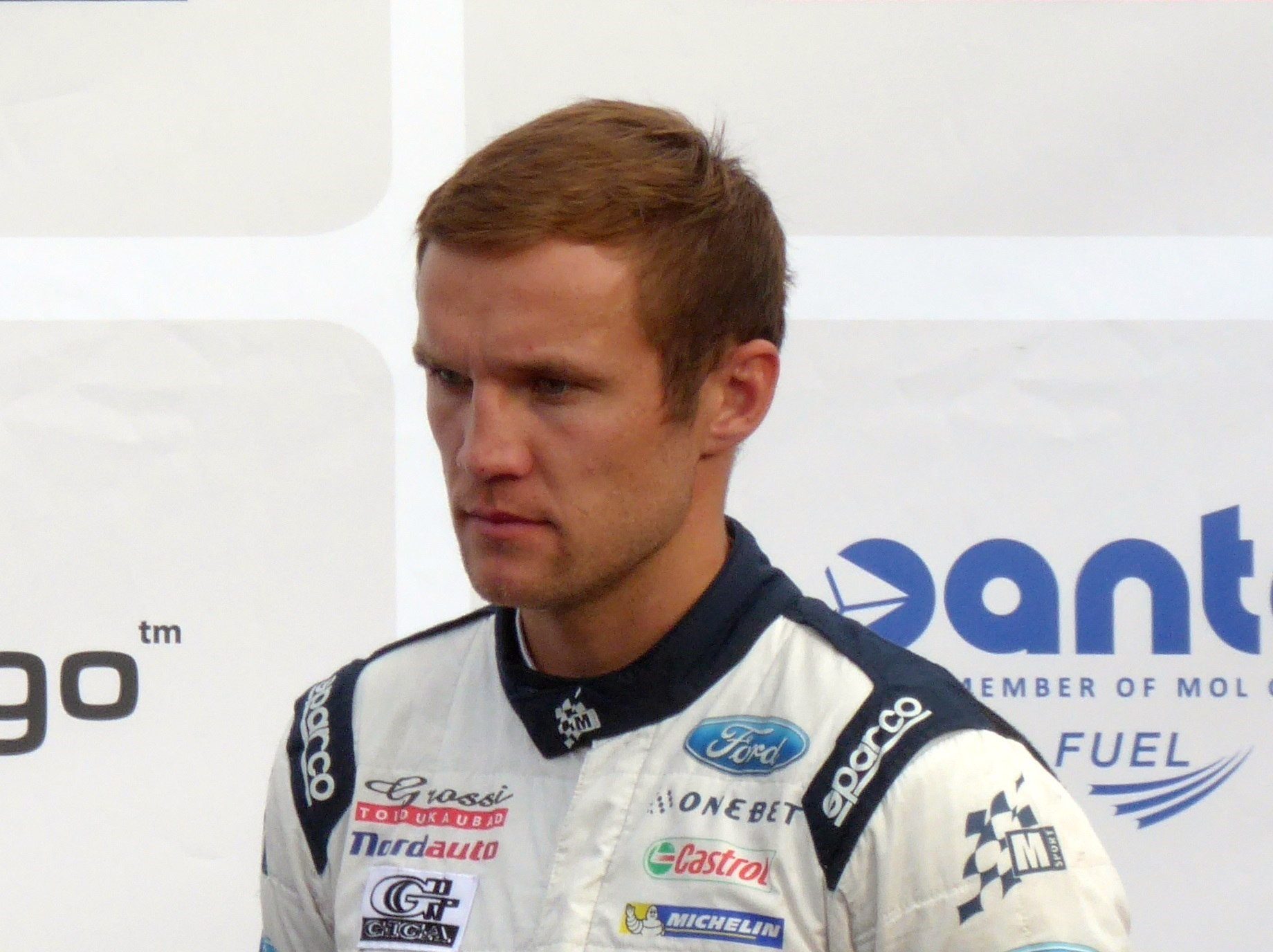
Estonian Martin Järveoja is one of the newest additions to the champion co-drivers list, having won in 2019 with Ott Tänak

=== By nationality ===
List of World Rally Championship Co-Drivers' Champions by nationality
Country	Co-Drivers	Total wins
Finland	6	13
France	4	11
Monaco	1	9
United Kingdom	5	5
Sweden	3	3
Italy	2	3
West Germany	1	2
Spain	1	2
Estonia	1	1
Belgium	1	1

== See also ==
- List of World Rally Championship Driver's champions
- List of World Rally Championship Constructors' champions
- List of World Rally Championship records
