= List of World Rally Championship Manufacturers' champions =

The World Rally Championship for Manufacturers (or WRC Manufacturers' Championship) is a title awarded by the FIA to the most successful manufacturer over a World Rally Championship season, as determined by a points system based on rally results. The WRC was formed from well-known and popular international rallies, most of which had previously been part of the European Rally Championship and/or the International Championship for Manufacturers; the series was first contested in 1973. The first official rallying Manufacturers' Champion was Alpine-Renault. On seventeen occasions the Manufacturers' Champion team has not contained the World Drivers' Champion for a given season.

In the 45 seasons the Championship has been awarded, only 13 different manufacturers have won it; Lancia being the most successful, with 10 titles including 6 consecutive from 1987 to 1992. Only seven countries have produced winning manufacturers: France (3), Japan (3), Italy (2), the United Kingdom (2), Germany (2), South Korea (1), and United States (1).

== Key ==
| Podiums | The number of times the champion finished in the top three in a rally |
| Margin | The margin of points by which the champion defeated the runner-up(s) |

== By season ==
Manufacturers who also facilitated the WRC Drivers' champion in the same season are shown in bold.

| Year | Manufacturers' Champions | Car(s) used | Wins | Podiums | Points | Margin |
|---|---|---|---|---|---|---|
| 1973 | (France) Alpine-Renault | Alpine-Renault A110 1800 | 6 | 15 | 147 | 63 |
| 1974 | (Italy) Lancia | Lancia Fulvia HF; Lancia Stratos HF | 3 | 6 | 94 | 25 |
| 1975 | (Italy) Lancia | Lancia Stratos HF | 4 | 7 | 96 | 35 |
| 1976 | (Italy) Lancia | Lancia Stratos HF | 4 | 10 | 112 | 55 |
| 1977 | (Italy) Fiat | Fiat 131 Abarth | 5 | 12 | 136 | 4 |
| 1978 | **(Italy) Fiat** | Fiat 131 Abarth | 5 | 12 | 134 | 34 |
| 1979 | **(United Kingdom) Ford** (Note: Ford Motor Company Limited, a British registered company, was the winning manufacturer. Its cars were homologated via the local ASN, RAC/MSA, thus were considered British under FIA rules, despite ultimate ownership by the Ford Motor Company of Dearborn, Michigan, USA) | Ford Escort RS1800 | 5 | 14 | 122 | 14 |
| 1980 | **(Italy) Fiat** | Fiat 131 Abarth | 5 | 12 | 120 | 27 |
| 1981 | (United Kingdom) Talbot | Talbot Sunbeam Lotus | 1 | 7 | 117 | 11 |
| 1982 | (West Germany) Audi | Audi Quattro | 7 | 12 | 116 | 12 |
| 1983 | (Italy) Lancia | Lancia Rally 037 | 5 | 14 | 118 | 2 |
| 1984 | **(West Germany) Audi** | Audi Quattro A2; Audi Sport Quattro S1 | 7 | 18 | 120 | 12 |
| 1985 | **(France) Peugeot** | Peugeot 205 Turbo 16; Peugeot 205 Turbo 16 E2 | 7 | 13 | 142 | 16 |
| 1986 | **(France) Peugeot** | Peugeot 205 Turbo 16 E2 | 6 | 12 | 137 | 15 |
| 1987 | **(Italy) Lancia** | Lancia Delta HF 4WD | 9 | 19 | 140 | 58 |
| 1988 | **(Italy) Lancia** | Lancia Delta HF 4WD; Lancia Delta HF Integrale | 10 | 23 | 140 | 61 |
| 1989 | **(Italy) Lancia** | Lancia Delta HF integrale Lancia Delta HF Integrale 16V | 7 | 18 | 137 | 39 |
| 1990 | (Italy) Lancia | Lancia Delta HF Integrale 16V | 6 | 16 | 137 | 6 |
| 1991 | **(Italy) Lancia** | Lancia Delta HF Integrale 16V | 6 | 20 | 140 | 9 |
| 1992 | (Italy) Lancia | Lancia Delta HF integrale Evo | 8 | 21 | 140 | 24 |
| 1993 | **(Japan) Toyota** | Toyota Celica Turbo 4WD ST185 | 7 | 17 | 157 | 12 |
| 1994 | **(Japan) Toyota** | Toyota Celica Turbo 4WD ST185 | 5 | 13 | 151 | 11 |
| 1995 | **(Japan) Subaru** | Subaru Impreza 555 | 5 | 11 | 350 | 43 |
| 1996 | (Japan) Subaru | Subaru Impreza 555 | 3 | 9 | 401 | 80 |
| 1997 | (Japan) Subaru | Subaru Impreza WRC 97 | 8 | 13 | 114 | 24 |
| 1998 | **(Japan) Mitsubishi** | Mitsubishi Lancer Evolution IV; Mitsubishi Lancer Evolution V | 7 | 9 | 91 | 6 |
| 1999 | (Japan) Toyota | Toyota Corolla WRC | 1 | 15 | 109 | 18 |
| 2000 | **(France) Peugeot** | Peugeot 206 WRC | 6 | 13 | 111 | 20 |
| 2001 | (France) Peugeot | Peugeot 206 WRC | 6 | 16 | 106 | 20 |
| 2002 | **(France) Peugeot** | Peugeot 206 WRC | 8 | 21 | 165 | 61 |
| 2003 | (France) Citroën | Citroën Xsara WRC | 4 | 13 | 160 | 15 |
| 2004 | **(France) Citroën** | Citroën Xsara WRC | 7 | 20 | 194 | 51 |
| 2005 | **(France) Citroën** | Citroën Xsara WRC | 11 | 20 | 188 | 53 |
| 2006 | (United Kingdom) Ford | Ford Focus RS WRC 06 | 8 | 20 | 195 | 29 |
| 2007 | (United Kingdom) Ford | Ford Focus RS WRC 06; Ford Focus RS WRC 07 | 8 | 25 | 212 | 29 |
| 2008 | **(France) Citroën** | Citroën C4 WRC | 11 | 25 | 191 | 18 |
| 2009 | **(France) Citroën** | Citroën C4 WRC | 7 | 19 | 167 | 27 |
| 2010 | **(France) Citroën** | Citroën C4 WRC | 10 | **31** | 456 | 119 |
| 2011 | **(France) Citroën** | Citroën DS3 WRC | 10 | 18 | 403 | 27 |
| 2012 | **(France) Citroën** | Citroën DS3 WRC | 10 | 20 | 453 | 144 |
| 2013 | **(Germany) Volkswagen** | Volkswagen Polo R WRC | 10 | 18 | 425 | 145 |
| 2014 | **(Germany) Volkswagen** | Volkswagen Polo R WRC | **12** | 18 | 447 | **237** |
| 2015 | **(Germany) Volkswagen** | Volkswagen Polo R WRC | 11 | 17 | 413 | 183 |
| 2016 | **(Germany) Volkswagen** | Volkswagen Polo R WRC | 7 | 14 | 377 | 62 |
| 2017 | **(United Kingdom) M-Sport** (Note: M-Sport were not an official Ford team from 2013 to 2017, entering under a waiver to the rule insisting on manufacturer association) | Ford Fiesta WRC | 5 | 19 | 428 | 83 |
| 2018 | (Japan) Toyota | Toyota Yaris WRC | 5 | 14 | 368 | 27 |
| 2019 | (South Korea) Hyundai | Hyundai i20 Coupe WRC | 4 | 13 | 380 | 18 |
| 2020 | (South Korea) Hyundai | Hyundai i20 Coupe WRC | 3 | 11 | 241 | 5 |
| 2021 | **(Japan) Toyota** | Toyota Yaris WRC | 9 | 18 | 522 | 59 |
| 2022 | **(Japan) Toyota** | Toyota GR Yaris Rally1 | 7 | 20 | 525 | 70 |
| 2023 | **(Japan) Toyota** | Toyota GR Yaris Rally1 | 8 | 18 | 548 | 116 |
| 2024 | (Japan) Toyota | Toyota GR Yaris Rally1 | 8 | 20 | 561 | 3 |
| 2025 | **(Japan) Toyota** | Toyota GR Yaris Rally1 | 12 | 25 | 735 | 224 |
| 2026 | **(Japan) Toyota** | Toyota GR Yaris Rally1 | 12 | 19 | 662 | 222 |

== By manufacturer ==
| Manufacturer | Total | Seasons |
|---|---|---|
| (Italy) Lancia | 11 | 1972 (Note: International Championship for Manufacturers), 1974, 1975, 1976, 1983, 1987, 1988, 1989, 1990, 1991, 1992 |
| (Japan) Toyota | 10 | 1993, 1994, 1999, 2018, 2021, 2022, 2023, 2024, 2025, 2026 |
| (France) Citroën | 8 | 2003, 2004, 2005, 2008, 2009, 2010, 2011, 2012 |
| (France) Peugeot | 5 | 1985, 1986, 2000, 2001, 2002 |
| (United Kingdom) Ford | 4 | 1979, 2006, 2007, 2017 |
| (Germany) Volkswagen | 4 | 2013, 2014, 2015, 2016 |
| (Italy) Fiat | 3 | 1977, 1978, 1980 |
| (Japan) Subaru | 3 | 1995, 1996, 1997 |
| (Germany) Audi | 2 | 1982, 1984 |
| (South Korea) Hyundai | 2 | 2019, 2020 |
| (France) Alpine-Renault | 2 | 1971,1973 |
| (Japan) Mitsubishi | 1 | 1998 |
| (United Kingdom) Talbot | 1 | 1981 |
| (Germany) Porsche | 1 | 1970 |

== By nationality ==
| Country | Manufacturers | Total |
|---|---|---|
| France | 3 | 15 |
| Italy | 2 | 14 |
| Japan | 3 | 14 |
| Germany | 2 | 7 |
| United Kingdom | 2 | 5 |
| South Korea | 1 | 2 |

== See also ==
- List of World Rally Championship Drivers' champions
- List of World Rally Championship Co-Drivers' champions
- List of World Rally Championship records
