= Lancia Delta HF =

1987–1993 Group A rally car by Lancia

Lancia Delta HF 4WD Lancia Delta HF integrale 8v Lancia Delta HF integrale 16v Lancia Delta HF integrale "Evo"
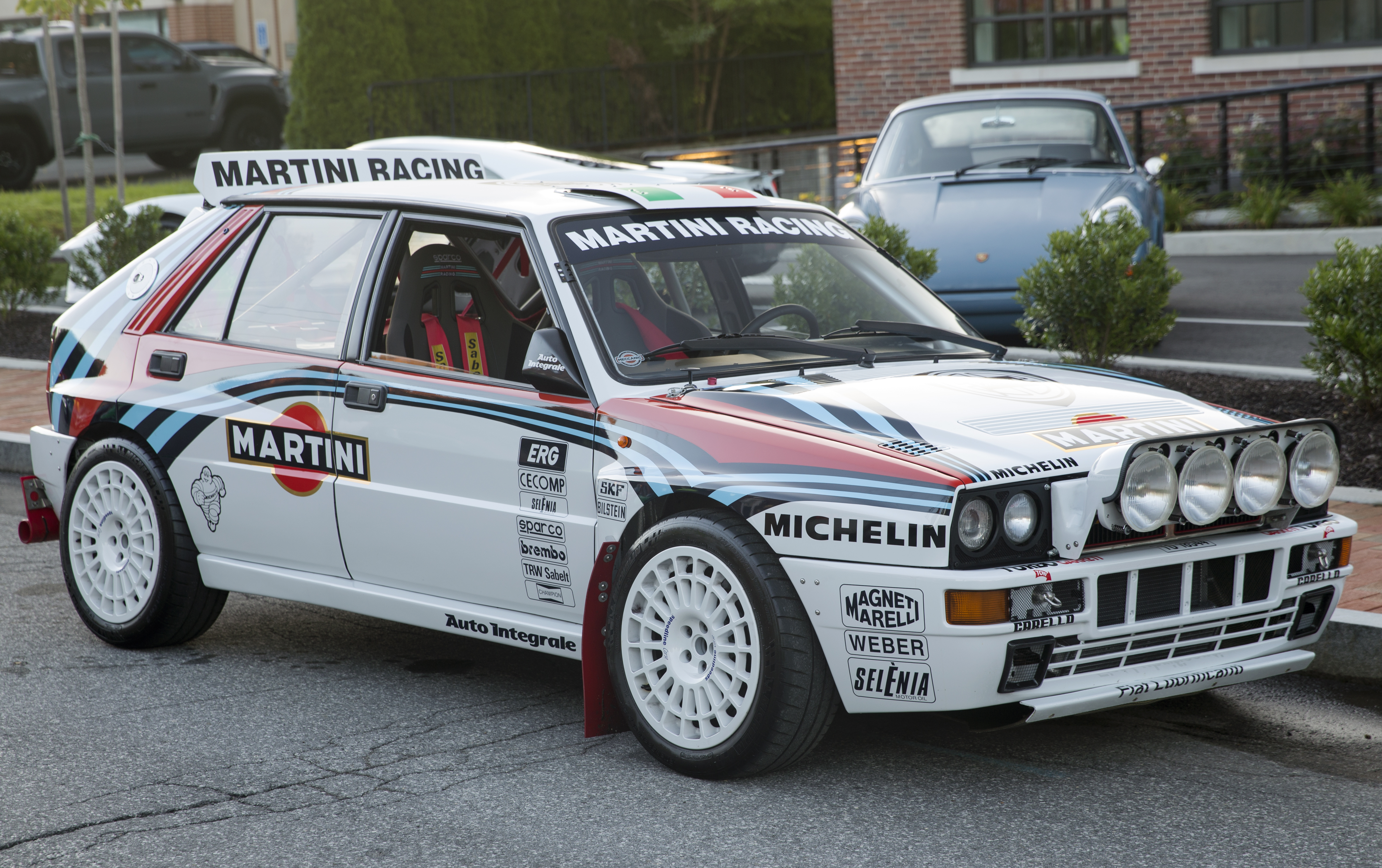
- Lancia Delta HF Integrale Evoluzione Group A
- Category: Group A
- Constructor: Alfa-Lancia Industriale
- Predecessor: Lancia Delta S4

Technical specifications
- Suspension (front): MacPherson struts
- Suspension (rear): MacPherson struts
- Engine: Lancia 831 E5.000 1,995 cc (121.7 cu in) inline-four, DOHC, 2 BS. Single Garrett turbocharger, intercooler. Front-transverse mounted.
- Transmission: 5- or 6-speed manual. Front open differential, centre epicyclic gearing with viscous coupling, rear Torsen.

Competition history
- Debut: 1987 55ème Rallye de Monte-Carlo
- First win: 1987 55ème Rallye de Monte-Carlo
- Last win: 1992 34º Rallye Sanremo
- Constructors' Championships: 1987 WRC, 1988 WRC, 1989 WRC, 1990 WRC, 1991 WRC, 1992 WRC
- Drivers' Championships: 1987 WRC (Juha Kankkunen); 1988 WRC (Miki Biasion); 1989 WRC (Miki Biasion); 1991 WRC (Juha Kankkunen)

The Lancia Delta HF is a Group A rally car built for the Martini Lancia by Lancia to compete in the World Rally Championship. It is based upon the Lancia Delta road car and replaced the Lancia Delta S4. The car was introduced for the 1987 World Rally Championship season and dominated the World Rally Championship, scoring 46 WRC victories overall and winning the constructors' championship a record six times in a row from 1987 to 1992, in addition to drivers' championship titles for Juha Kankkunen (1987 and 1991) and Miki Biasion (1988 and 1989), making Lancia the most successful marque in the history of the WRC and the Delta the most successful car.

== Competition history ==
=== 1987 ===
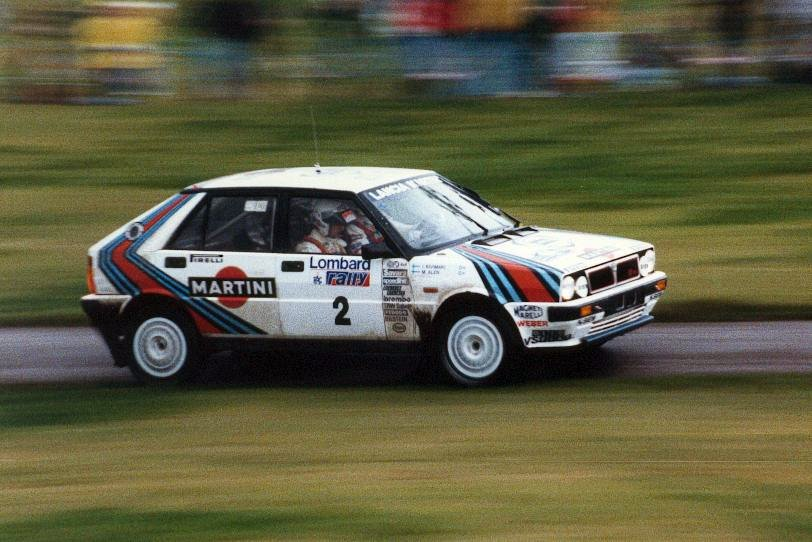
Markku Alén's Delta HF 4WD at the 1987 RAC Rally

During the early 1980s the top level of rallying was dominated by the Group B formula, for which Lancia produced the rear-drive 037 and then, when that became obsolete, the Delta S4. The entire formula was abolished at the end of the 1986 season, however, after a string of fatal accidents, leaving Group A as the top formula for the 1987 and subsequent seasons.

The sudden change in the rules left many manufacturers without a suitable car, with the partial exception of Lancia. The Delta HF 4WD (Abarth SE043), with its front mounted two-litre turbocharged engine and four-wheel-drive, was clearly a more suitable Group A rally car than its rivals, the underpowered Mazda 323 and Ford Sierra XR4x4, the powerful but rear-drive Ford Sierra RS Cosworth and BMW M3, and the front-drive Opel Kadett GSi and Renault 11 Turbo. However, it was not without flaws. The wheel arches were restrictive, the wheels and therefore the brakes were too small, and the suspension travel was limited. Access to key components for servicing was also restricted by the car's compact size and transverse-engined layout, the one defect that subsequent evolutions could not fully rectify. Even so, little doubt was expressed before the 1987 season began that Lancia, and one of its drivers, would win the World Championship.

In 1987 the Lancias were driven by Massimo Biasion, Juha Kankkunen and Markku Alén. Biasion opened with a victory in the Monte Carlo Rally and later in the season won the Argentina and Sanremo rallies. However, Juha Kankkunen's four podium places, coupled with victories on the Olympus Rally and the final round, the RAC Rally, saw him clinch the title ahead of Markku Alén, whose title hopes ended on the RAC with a series of accidents, including overturning the car in front of the television cameras on one of the opening day's short spectator stages. Lancia won seven of the eleven rounds which counted towards the manufacturers’ championship and with them the world title. However Kankkunen, reputedly disillusioned with team politics and the apparent favoritism shown towards Biasion, left the team at the end of the season and rejoined Toyota.

=== 1988 ===
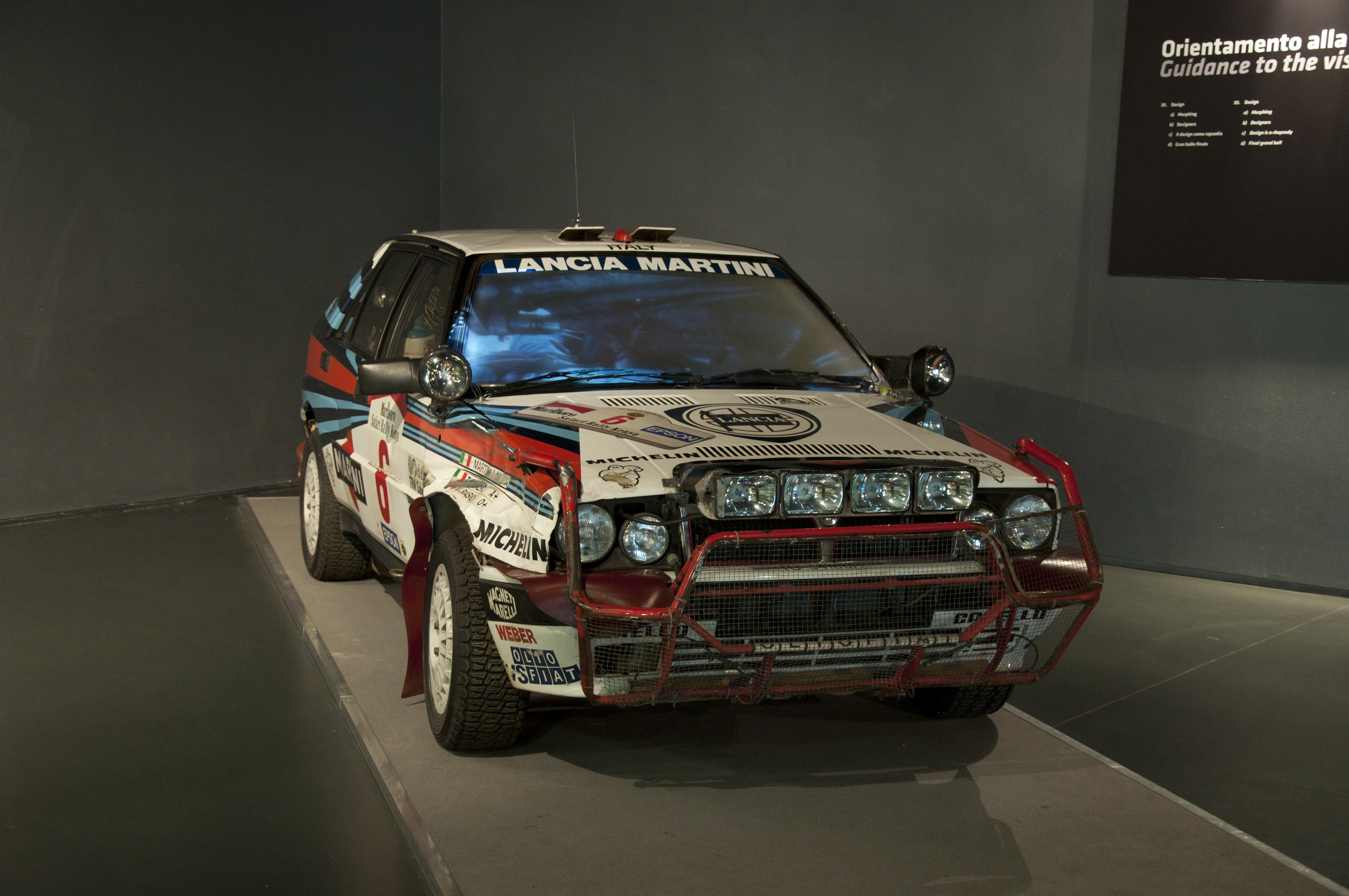
1988 Safari Rally Delta Integrale 8v, driven by Miki Biasion and Tiziano Siviero

The Delta HF 4WD also won the first two events of the 1988 season, Bruno Saby taking the win at Monte Carlo and Markku Alén in Sweden, before the HF integrale "8v" (Abarth SE044) appeared at the third round in Portugal. Team boss Cesare Fiorio remarked in an interview before that event that the Integrale's larger wheels, bigger brakes, improved suspension and greater power would make it more competitive on asphalt, although on gravel it represented a relatively small improvement over the 4WD. Markku Alen lost time with transmission failure early in the event, giving rise to some concern about the strength of the transmission and causing the team to undertake a great deal of precautionary maintenance to Biasion's car. However, the Italian driver suffered no serious mechanical problems and continued to take victory. A new and stronger six-speed gearbox was already under development and was introduced for the next event. Lancia then dominated the rest of the season. Only once were they beaten in a straight fight, on the dry asphalt of Corsica by Didier Auriol in a Ford Sierra RS Cosworth. By the season's end Lancia had won ten of the eleven rounds which counted for the manufacturers’ series, and Biasion was drivers’ World Champion, having clinched the title on the penultimate round. Markku Alén rounded off the season with victory on the RAC Rally, a personal first for the Finn.

=== 1989 ===
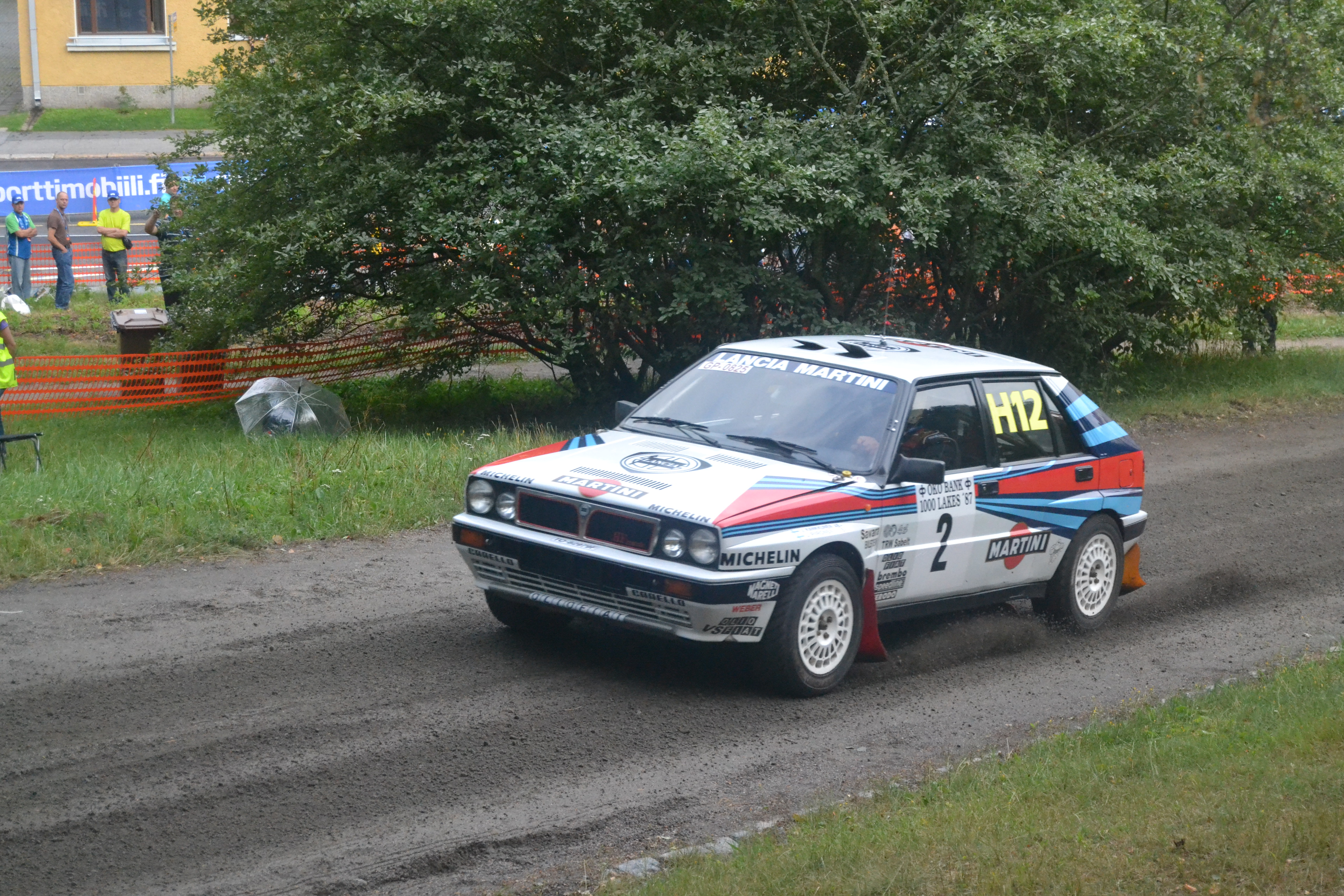
A 1989 Group A HF Integrale 8v driving in Rally Finland

During 1989 serious challengers to Lancia's dominance began to emerge, including the Toyota Celica GT-Four ST165, which in the hands of Juha Kankkunen had run Markku Alén close on the previous year's 1000 Lakes Rally before retiring with mechanical failure. The Toyota remained unreliable for the first part of the 1989 season, however, and Lancia, with Biasion, Alen and Auriol (whom the team had recruited after his performances in the Ford the previous year) the lead drivers, were able to pull out a substantial championship lead. By the time guest driver Mikael Ericsson took it to victory on the Rally Argentina, the 8v Integrale had won all of its previous twelve World Championship events. Later in the season, however, developmental difficulties with the Mitsubishi Galant were overcome and Ericsson, now driving for Mitsubishi, won the 1000 Lakes Rally, where no Lancias finished in the top three. Kankkunen then took the Toyota to a maiden victory in Australia, with his teammate Kenneth Eriksson second and Alén third. The Integrale was beginning to slip behind its key competitors, but by then Lancia was already working on the next evolution. The Integrale 16v made its début on the 1989 Rallye Sanremo where, for the first and only time, it ran in Italian racing red. Didier Auriol went out early in the event after a high-speed crash, but Biasion went on to win. Having won both the manufacturers’ and drivers’ titles for the third year running, Lancia declined to contest the final round of the season, the RAC Rally.

=== 1990 ===
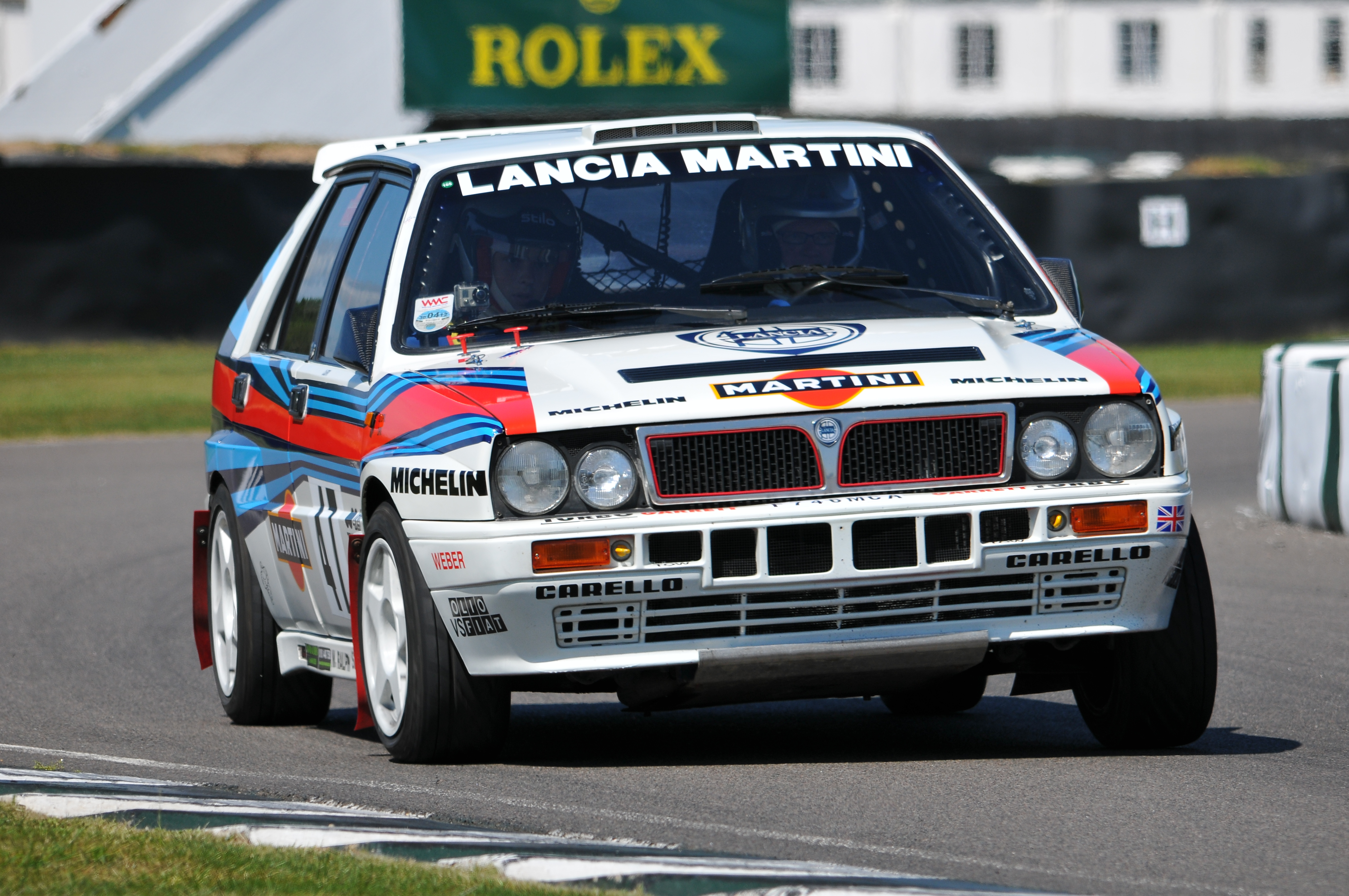
1990 Delta Integrale 16V

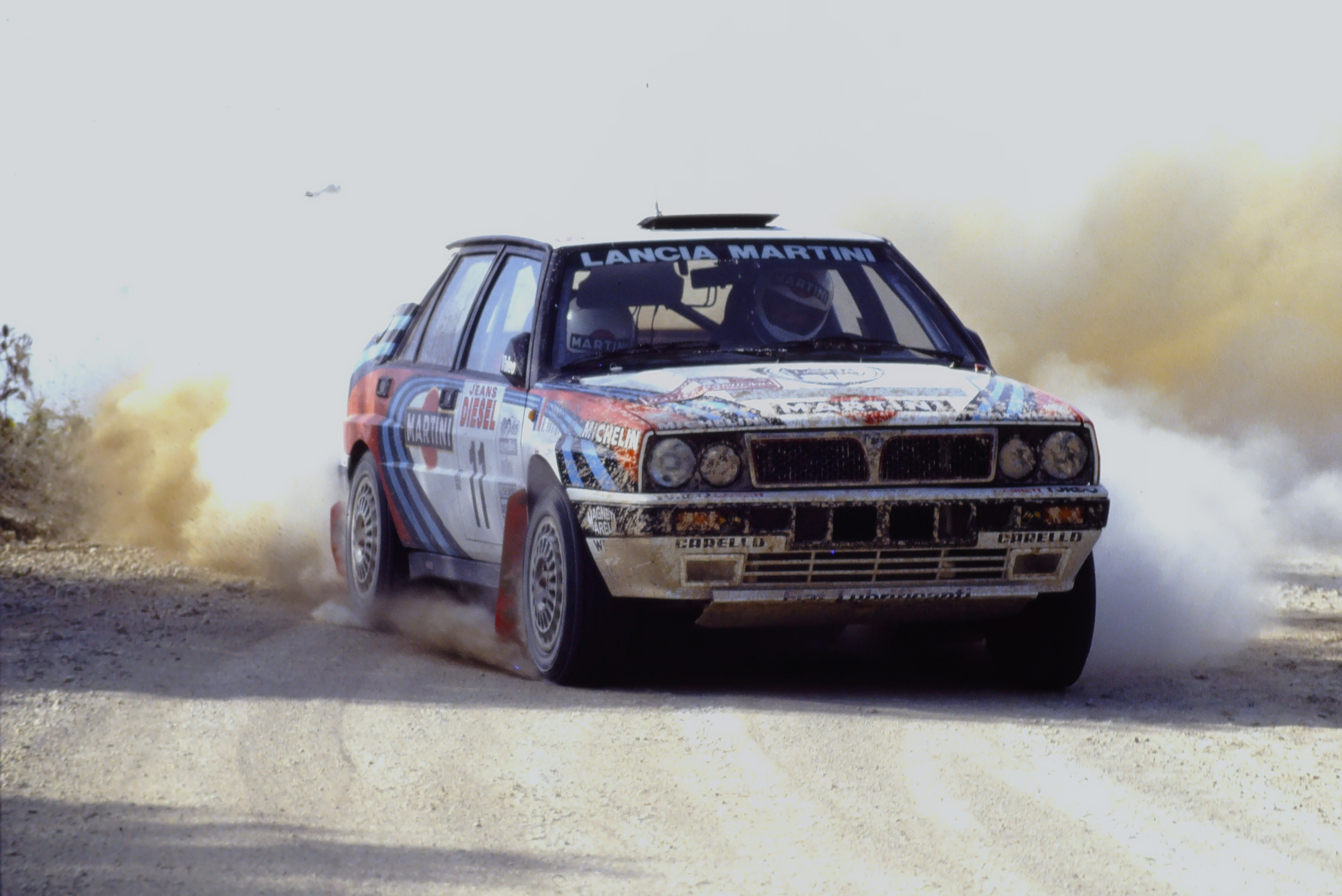
1990 Sanremo rally winner Delta Integrale 16V (Auriol/Occelli)

Lancia continued to use the HF integrale 16v throughout the 1990 season. Markku Alen left the team after nearly fifteen years whilst Juha Kankkunen rejoined, alongside Biasion and Auriol. The French driver won the Monte Carlo Rally, Tour de Corse and Sanremo Rally whilst Biasion won in Portugal, giving Lancia an advantage it retained until the end of the season, by which time it had taken six wins and won the manufacturers' title for the fourth time. However, the wins were shared between the team's three drivers, and in the drivers’ championship race Sainz, driving a Toyota Celica GT-Four ST165, secured a string of mid-season victories that gave him the title. It was first time since 1986 that Lancia had not claimed both drivers’ and manufacturers’ FIA championships.

=== 1991 ===
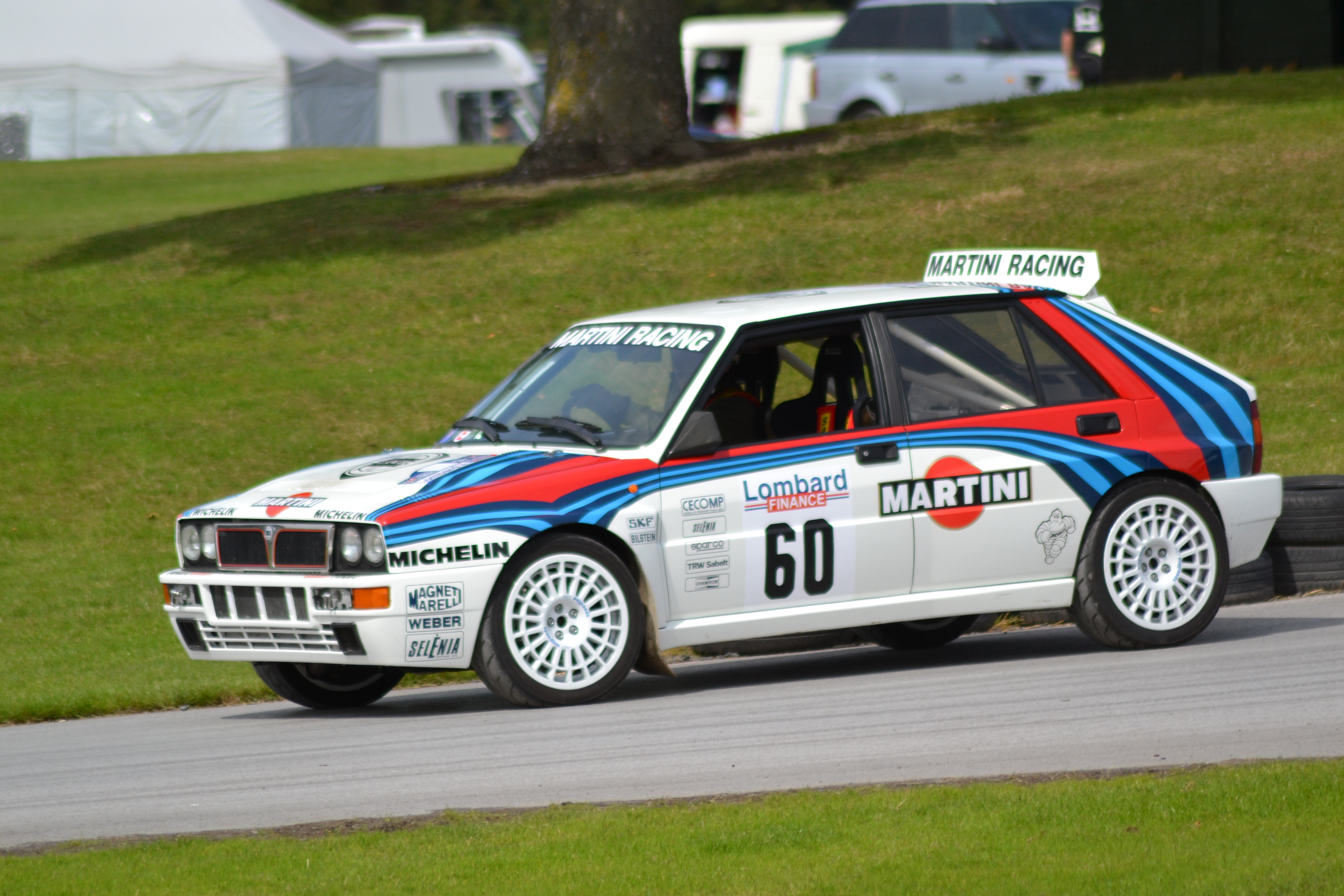
Miki Biasion's 1991 Delta Integrale Evo

The 1991 season saw another close battle between Toyota and Lancia. There was some pre-season speculation that the Delta was now outclassed by the Celica, an impression reinforced by Carlos Sainz's win on the opening round, the Monte Carlo. However, in the hands of Juha Kankkunen the Delta took wins in Kenya, Argentina, Finland and Australia, and Didier Auriol also won at Sanremo, giving Lancia the manufacturers’ title for a record fifth time. Meanwhile, Sainz crashed out in Australia and retired with electrical failure in Catalunya, putting Kankkunen in contention for the driver's title. By this time Toyota and Lancia were reputedly working with blank cheques and win-at-all-costs budgets from their parent companies, and rumours abounded of creative interpretations of the rules, especially on the part of Lancia. However, nothing was ever proven, although it was common knowledge that all of the major Group A cars had far more power than the notional 300 bhp limit, probably closer to 400 in most cases. The Lancia was among the most powerful, which, along with its reliability, accounts partly for its continued success in the face of handicaps such as poor weight distribution (the Delta was always nose-heavy) and a transmission system less sophisticated than that of the Toyota. The 1991 RAC Rally saw a close battle in the British forests between Kankkunen and Sainz, which was settled late in the event when the head gasket blew on Sainz's Toyota, giving Kankkunen his third driver's championship.

=== 1992 ===
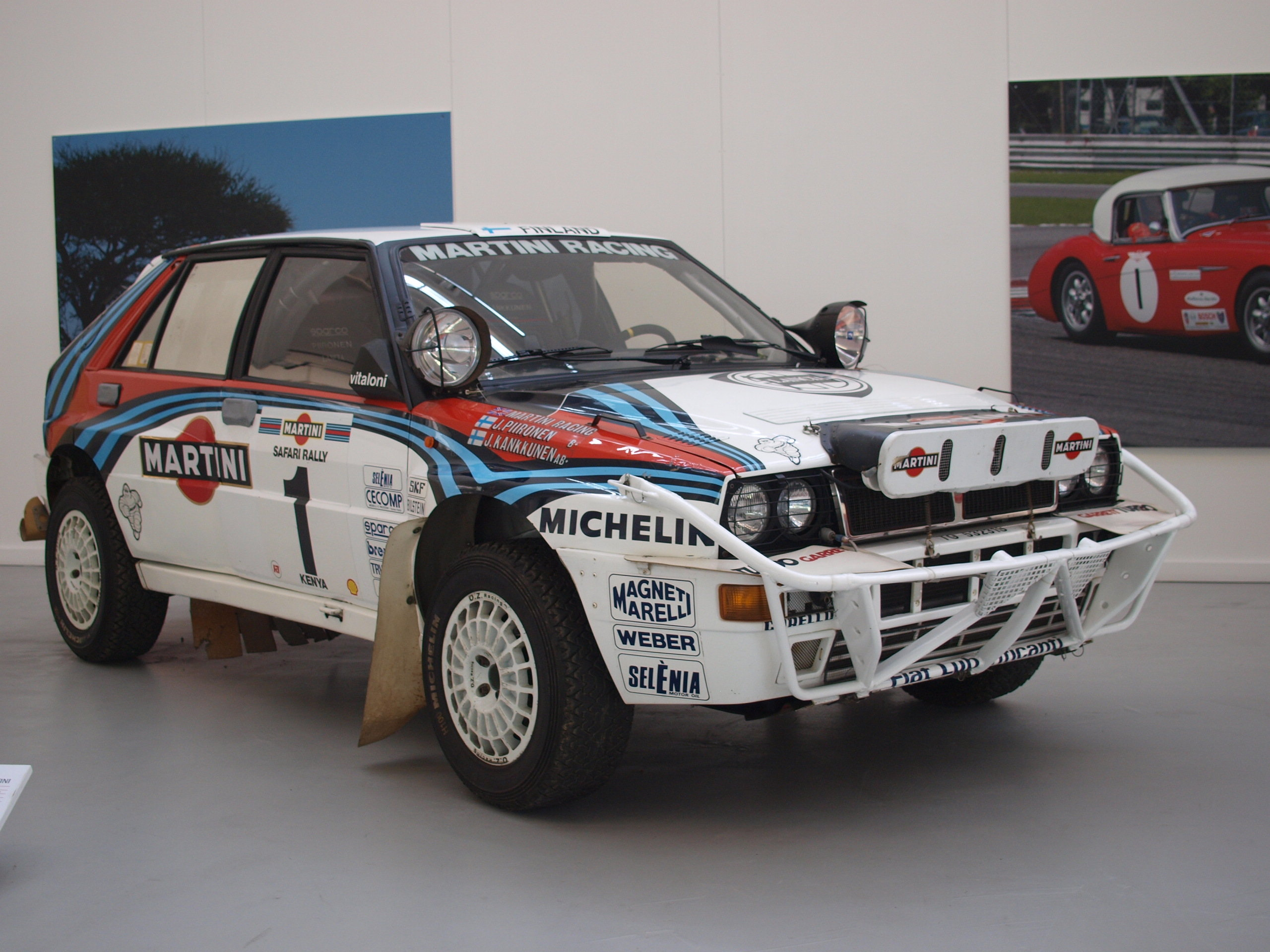
The Delta HF Integrale "Evo"; with 2nd place overall by Kankkunen and Piironen at Safari Rally 1992, on display at Museo Nazionale dell'Automobile

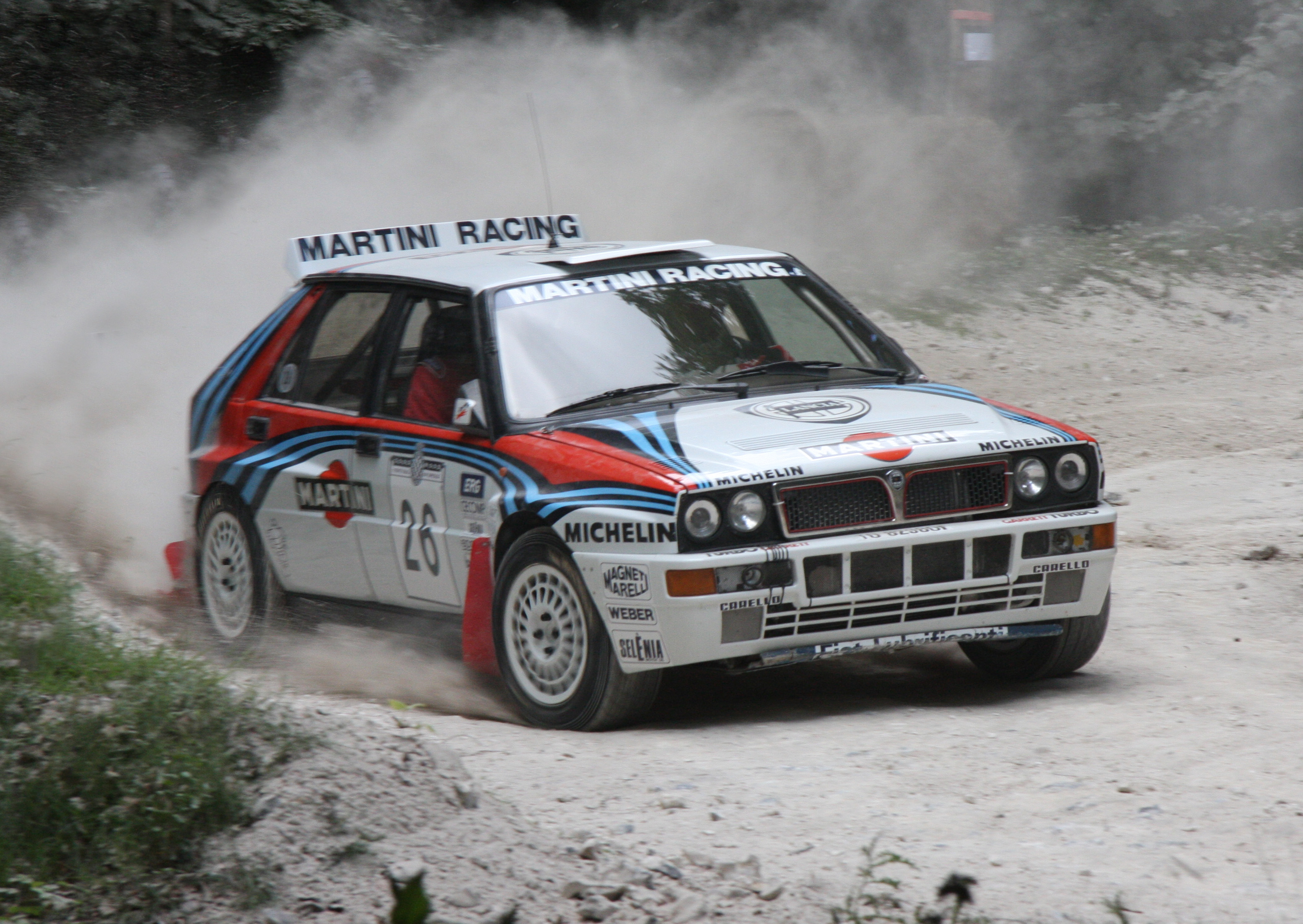
The Martini Racing's Delta HF integrale, as driven by Didier Auriol and co-pilot Bernard Occelli for the 1992 WRC Season

During the latter part of the 1991 season, Lancia developed the Delta HF integrale "Evoluzione" (Abarth SE050), sometimes nicknamed the "Deltona" (Big Delta) or "Super Delta", which would début on the 1992 Monte Carlo. This final evolution, with its stiffer body, wider wheel arches, bigger wheels and brakes, improved suspension and aerodynamics and more powerful engine, was said to be 5–6% faster under most circumstances than the 16v car. However, it represented the most that could be extracted from a design that was fundamentally outdated and, with no successor planned, Lancia officially withdrew from rallying at the end of 1991. For the next two seasons the cars would be run by the semi-private Jolly Club team, albeit initially with continuing support from the factory.

For 1992 Toyota had an all-new Celica, in contrast to Lancia's updated Delta, leading to renewed speculation that Lancia would be outclassed. In fact the Celica initially proved problematic and Auriol dominated the early part of the season for Lancia, taking a record six wins and pulling out a large championship lead. Kankkunen also scored consistent podium finishes and a win in Portugal, whilst guest driver Andrea Aghini won the Rallye Sanremo. Lancia therefore took the manufacturers’ title for a sixth consecutive year. Meanwhile, Sainz initially struggled with the new car and slipped behind, even struggling at times to beat a resurgent Ford team with its rather unwieldy Sierra, but a late-season fight-back by the Spaniard, coupled with retirement in Sanremo and only tenth place in Catalunya for Auriol, saw Kankkunen, Auriol, and Sainz enter the RAC rally within three points of each other. The three-way title race was decided when Auriol's engine failed and Kankkunen went off the road, leaving Sainz to take an unexpected second driver's title.

=== 1993 ===
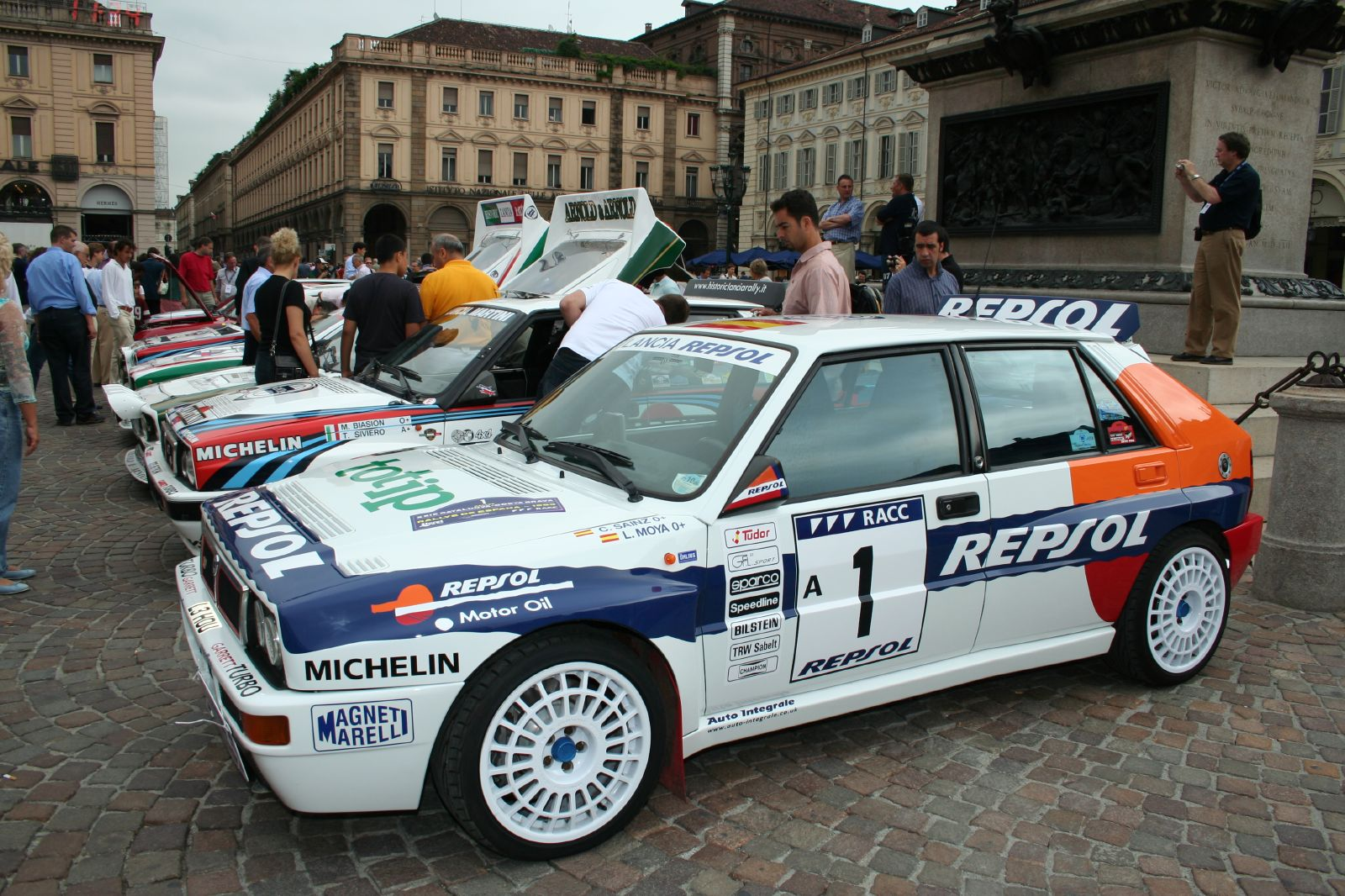
Jolly Club's Delta HF integrale, as driven by Carlos Sainz and co-pilot Luis Moya for the 1993 WRC Season

For 1993, Auriol and Kankkunen both left Lancia and joined the Toyota team, while Sainz moved to the Jolly Club, where he was supported by Aghini and Gustavo Trelles. Lancia's sponsorship from Martini also ended, and the Jolly Club Deltas ran in the colours of Sainz's sponsor, oil firm Repsol. With the end of the factory's involvement technical developments were minor, despite assurances given to Sainz at the beginning of the season that development of the car would continue, and by mid-season it was clear that the Delta was now outclassed by newer competitors such as the latest Toyota and the Ford Escort RS Cosworth. Sainz took second on the Acropolis Rally, but that was the car's best placing. He finished second again at Sanremo, but the team was subsequently disqualified and docked points for fuel irregularities, and Sainz had by then retired from the Catalunya Rally with electrical failure. The Jolly Club decided not to contest the final round of the series and withdrew, signalling the end of both the Delta's career as a top-line rally car and Lancia's involvement in the World Rally Championship.

In total, the four evolutions of the Lancia Delta won 46 World Championship rallies, and Lancia's run of six consecutive manufacturers’ titles remains a record.

=== European Championship ===
Outside the World Championship the Delta was used by several private teams, with varying degrees of backing from the works team. Jolly Club ran as a second-string team throughout the Group A era, before taking over from the official works team for 1992–3. Other teams using the car included Astra Motorsport and HF Grifone. Drivers using Deltas run by teams such as these won the European title in every year between 1987 and 1991, and also in 1993, the car's last major success. Astra continued to run Deltas on European and some World Championship events in 1994, the best result being fourth place for Alessandro Fiorio on the Acropolis Rally. Deltas also took many national titles in continental Europe.

== WRC victories ==
No.	Event	Season	Driver	Co-driver	Car
1	(Monaco) 55ème Rallye Automobile de Monte-Carlo	1987	(Italy) Miki Biasion	(Italy) Tiziano Siviero	Lancia Delta HF 4WD
2	21º Rallye de Portugal Vinho do Porto	1987	(Finland) Markku Alén	(Finland) Ilkka Kivimäki	Lancia Delta HF 4WD
3	(Greece) 34th Acropolis Rally	1987	(Finland) Markku Alén	(Finland) Ilkka Kivimäki	Lancia Delta HF 4WD
4	(United States) 22nd Olympus Rally	1987	(Finland) Juha Kankkunen	(Finland) Juha Piironen	Lancia Delta HF 4WD
5	17th AWA Clarion Rally New Zealand	1987	(Austria) Franz Wittmann	(Austria) Jörg Pattermann	Lancia Delta HF 4WD
6	7º Marlboro Rally Argentina	1987	(Italy) Miki Biasion	(Italy) Tiziano Siviero	Lancia Delta HF 4WD
7	(Finland) 37th 1000 Lakes Rally	1987	(Finland) Markku Alén	(Finland) Ilkka Kivimäki	Lancia Delta HF 4WD
8	(Italy) 29º Rallye Sanremo	1987	(Italy) Miki Biasion	(Italy) Tiziano Siviero	Lancia Delta HF 4WD
9	(United Kingdom) 36th Lombard RAC Rally	1987	(Finland) Juha Kankkunen	(Finland) Juha Piironen	Lancia Delta HF 4WD
10	(Monaco) 56ème Rallye Automobile de Monte-Carlo	1988	(France) Bruno Saby	(France) Jean-François Fauchille	Lancia Delta HF 4WD
11	(Sweden) 38th International Swedish Rally	1988	(Finland) Markku Alén	(Finland) Ilkka Kivimäki	Lancia Delta HF 4WD
12	22º Rallye de Portugal Vinho do Porto	1988	(Italy) Miki Biasion	(Italy) Carlo Cassina	Lancia Delta HF integrale 8v
13	(Kenya) 36th Marlboro Safari Rally	1988	(Italy) Miki Biasion	(Italy) Tiziano Siviero	Lancia Delta HF integrale 8v
14	(Greece) 35th Acropolis Rally	1988	(Italy) Miki Biasion	(Italy) Tiziano Siviero	Lancia Delta HF integrale 8v
15	(United States) 23rd Olympus Rally	1988	(Italy) Miki Biasion	(Italy) Tiziano Siviero	Lancia Delta HF integrale 8v
16	8º Marlboro Rally Argentina	1988	(Argentina) Jorge Recalde	(Argentina) Jorge del Buono	Lancia Delta HF integrale 8v
17	(Finland) 38th 1000 Lakes Rally	1988	(Finland) Markku Alén	(Finland) Ilkka Kivimäki	Lancia Delta HF integrale 8v
18	(Italy) 30º Rallye Sanremo - Rallye d'Italia	1988	(Italy) Miki Biasion	(Italy) Tiziano Siviero	Lancia Delta HF integrale 8v
19	(United Kingdom) 37th Lombard RAC Rally	1988	(Finland) Markku Alén	(Finland) Ilkka Kivimäki	Lancia Delta HF integrale 8v
20	(Monaco) 57ème Rallye Automobile de Monte-Carlo	1989	(Italy) Miki Biasion	(Italy) Tiziano Siviero	Lancia Delta HF integrale 8v
21	23º Rallye de Portugal Vinho do Porto	1989	(Italy) Miki Biasion	(Italy) Tiziano Siviero	Lancia Delta HF integrale 8v
22	(Kenya) 37th Marlboro Safari Rally	1989	(Italy) Miki Biasion	(Italy) Tiziano Siviero	Lancia Delta HF integrale 8v
23	33ème Tour de Corse - Rallye de France	1989	(France) Didier Auriol	(France) Bernard Occelli	Lancia Delta HF integrale 8v
24	(Greece) 36th Acropolis Rally	1989	(Italy) Miki Biasion	(Italy) Tiziano Siviero	Lancia Delta HF integrale 8v
25	9º Rally Argentina	1989	(Sweden) Mikael Ericsson	(Sweden) Claes Billstam	Lancia Delta HF integrale 8v
26	(Italy) 31º Rallye Sanremo - Rallye d'Italia	1989	(Italy) Miki Biasion	(Italy) Tiziano Siviero	Lancia Delta HF integrale 16v
27	(Monaco) 58ème Rallye Automobile de Monte-Carlo	1990	(France) Didier Auriol	(France) Bernard Occelli	Lancia Delta HF integrale 16v
28	24º Rallye de Portugal Vinho do Porto	1990	(Italy) Miki Biasion	(Italy) Tiziano Siviero	Lancia Delta HF integrale 16v
29	34ème Tour de Corse - Rallye de France	1990	(France) Didier Auriol	(France) Bernard Occelli	Lancia Delta HF integrale 16v
30	10º Rally Argentina	1990	(Italy) Miki Biasion	(Italy) Tiziano Siviero	Lancia Delta HF integrale 16v
31	3rd Commonwealth Bank Rally Australia	1990	(Finland) Juha Kankkunen	(Finland) Juha Piironen	Lancia Delta HF integrale 16v
32	(Italy) 32º Rallye Sanremo - Rallye d'Italia	1990	(France) Didier Auriol	(France) Bernard Occelli	Lancia Delta HF integrale 16v
33	(Kenya) 39th Martini Safari Rally	1991	(Finland) Juha Kankkunen	(Finland) Juha Piironen	Lancia Delta HF integrale 16v
34	(Greece) 38th Acropolis Rally	1991	(Finland) Juha Kankkunen	(Finland) Juha Piironen	Lancia Delta HF integrale 16v
35	(Finland) 41st 1000 Lakes Rally	1991	(Finland) Juha Kankkunen	(Finland) Juha Piironen	Lancia Delta HF integrale 16v
36	4th Telecom Rally Australia	1991	(Finland) Juha Kankkunen	(Finland) Juha Piironen	Lancia Delta HF integrale 16v
37	(Italy) 33º Rallye Sanremo - Rallye d'Italia	1991	(France) Didier Auriol	(France) Bernard Occelli	Lancia Delta HF integrale 16v
38	(United Kingdom) 47th Lombard RAC Rally	1991	(Finland) Juha Kankkunen	(Finland) Juha Piironen	Lancia Delta HF integrale 16v
39	(Monaco) 60ème Rallye Automobile de Monte-Carlo	1992	(France) Didier Auriol	(France) Bernard Occelli	Lancia Delta HF integrale "Evo"
40	26º Rallye de Portugal Vinho do Porto	1992	(Finland) Juha Kankkunen	(Finland) Juha Piironen	Lancia Delta HF integrale "Evo"
41	36ème Tour de Corse - Rallye de France	1992	(France) Didier Auriol	(France) Bernard Occelli	Lancia Delta HF integrale "Evo"
42	(Greece) 39th Acropolis Rally	1992	(France) Didier Auriol	(France) Bernard Occelli	Lancia Delta HF integrale "Evo"
43	12º Rally Argentina	1992	(France) Didier Auriol	(France) Bernard Occelli	Lancia Delta HF integrale "Evo"
44	(Finland) 42nd 1000 Lakes Rally	1992	(France) Didier Auriol	(France) Bernard Occelli	Lancia Delta HF integrale "Evo"
45	5th Telecom Rally Australia	1992	(France) Didier Auriol	(France) Bernard Occelli	Lancia Delta HF integrale "Evo"
46	(Italy) 34º Rallye Sanremo - Rallye d'Italia	1992	(Italy) Andrea Aghini	(Italy) Sauro Farnocchia	Lancia Delta HF integrale "Evo"
