= List of World Rally Championship Drivers' champions =

Winners of FIA World Rally Championship Drivers Title

The World Rally Championship (WRC) is a rallying series administered by Fédération Internationale de l'Automobile (FIA), motorsport's world governing body. The series currently consists of 13 three-day events driven on surfaces that range from gravel and tarmac to snow and ice. Each rally is split into 15–25 special stages, which are run against the clock on closed roads. The WRC was formed from well-known and popular international rallies, most of which had previously been part of the European Rally Championship and/or the International Championship for Manufacturers; the series was first contested in 1973. The drivers' championship was first awarded in 1977 and 1978 as an FIA Cup for Drivers title, to Sandro Munari and Markku Alén, respectively. The first official world champion in rallying was Björn Waldegård in 1979.

Each season normally consists of 12 to 16 rallies driven on surfaces ranging from gravel and tarmac to snow and ice. Points from these events are calculated towards the drivers', co-drivers' and manufacturers' world championships. The driver's championship and manufacturer's championship are separate championships, but are based on the same point system. In the current points system, points are awarded at the end of each rally to the top ten WRC (overall) drivers and co-drivers that qualify as follows: 25, 17, 15, 12, 10, 8, 6, 4, 2, 1. In addition to those points, from 2011 each event holds 1 special stage, the Power Stage, in which drivers and co-drivers can score extra points – currently awarded to five fastest drivers (5, 4, 3, 2, 1). From 2025 points are awarded to the five fastest crews on Sunday (5, 4, 3, 2, 1).

Sébastien Loeb and Sébastien Ogier hold joint record for the most drivers' championships, winning nine during their career. Loeb holds the record for the most championships won in a row; he won his nine titles consecutively from 2004 to 2012. Kalle Rovanperä is the youngest world champion; he was 22 years old when he won the 2022 World Rally Championship. French drivers have won the most titles with 19 championships between 3 drivers. Finland are second with 16 championships between 8 drivers. Citroën cars have won the most drivers' championships with nine titles, all of them with Loeb.

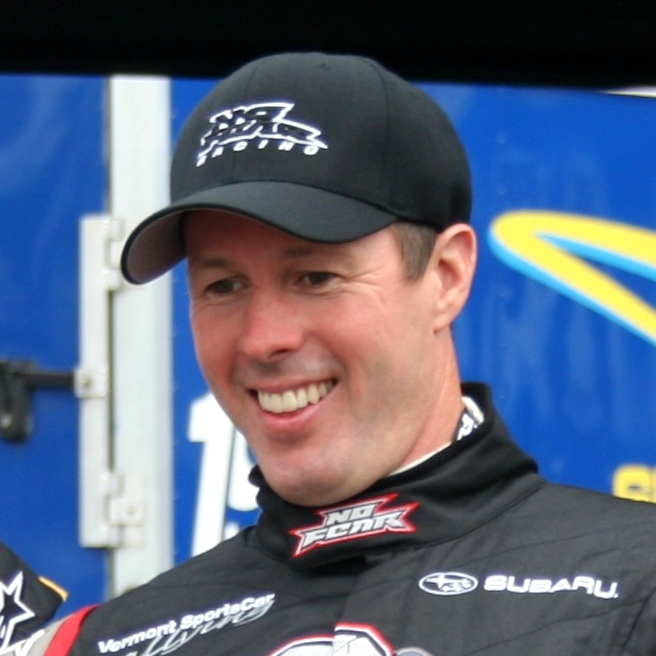
Colin McRae, winner of the 1995 World Rally Championship

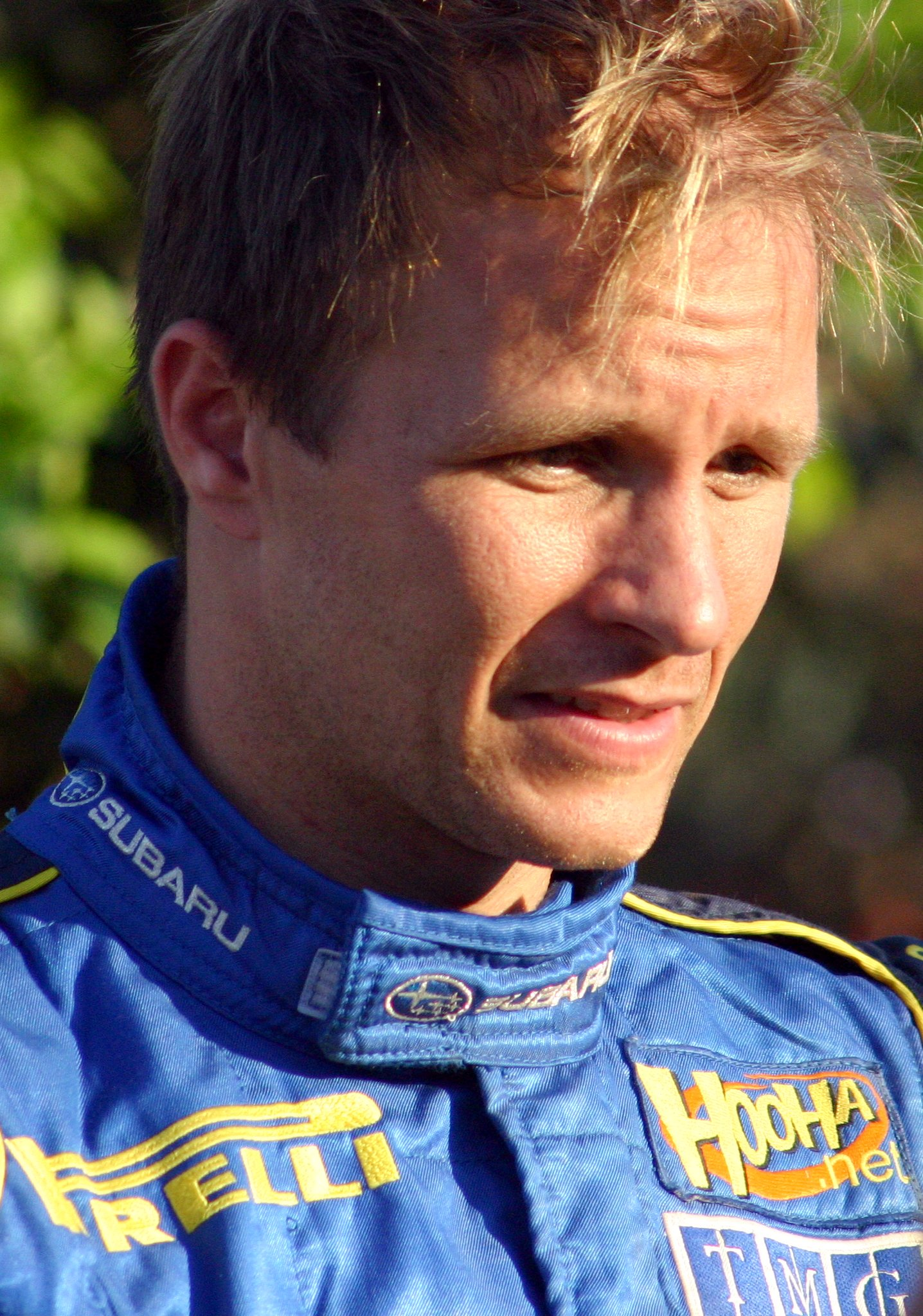
Petter Solberg won the World Rally Championship in 2003.

== Winners ==
=== By season ===
List of World Rally Championship Drivers' champions
Season	Country	Driver	Car
1977	Italy	Sandro Munari (Note: In 1977 and 1978, the drivers' championships was the FIA Cup for Drivers.)	Lancia Stratos HF
1978	Finland	Markku Alén (Note: Alén drove a Lancia Stratos HF at the Rallye Sanremo and at the Lombard RAC Rally.)	Fiat 131 Abarth
1979	Sweden	Björn Waldegård (Note: Waldegård drove a Mercedes 450 SLC 5.0 at the endurance rallies; the Safari Rally and the Rallye Côte d'Ivoire.)	Ford Escort RS1800
1980	West Germany	Walter Röhrl	Fiat 131 Abarth
1981	Finland	Ari Vatanen	Ford Escort RS1800
1982	West Germany	Walter Röhrl	Opel Ascona 400
1983	Finland	Hannu Mikkola	Audi Quattro A1/A2
1984	Sweden	Stig Blomqvist	Audi Quattro A2/Sport Quattro
1985	Finland	Timo Salonen	Peugeot 205 T16/E2
1986	Finland	Juha Kankkunen	Peugeot 205 T16 E2
1987	Finland	Juha Kankkunen	Lancia Delta HF 4WD
1988	Italy	Miki Biasion	Lancia Delta HF 4WD/Integrale
1989	Italy	Miki Biasion	Lancia Delta Integrale 16V
1990	Spain	Carlos Sainz	Toyota Celica GT-Four ST165
1991	Finland	Juha Kankkunen	Lancia Delta HF Integrale 16V
1992	Spain	Carlos Sainz	Toyota Celica Turbo 4WD ST185
1993	Finland	Juha Kankkunen	Toyota Celica Turbo 4WD ST185
1994	France	Didier Auriol	Toyota Celica Turbo 4WD ST185
1995	United Kingdom	Colin McRae	Subaru Impreza 555
1996	Finland	Tommi Mäkinen	Mitsubishi Lancer Evolution III
1997	Finland	Tommi Mäkinen	Mitsubishi Lancer Evolution IV
1998	Finland	Tommi Mäkinen	Mitsubishi Lancer Evolution IV/Evolution V
1999	Finland	Tommi Mäkinen	Mitsubishi Lancer Evolution VI
2000	Finland	Marcus Grönholm	Peugeot 206 WRC
2001	United Kingdom	Richard Burns	Subaru Impreza WRC 2001
2002	Finland	Marcus Grönholm	Peugeot 206 WRC
2003	Norway	Petter Solberg	Subaru Impreza WRC 2003
2004	France	Sébastien Loeb	Citroën Xsara WRC
2005	France	Sébastien Loeb	Citroën Xsara WRC
2006	France	Sébastien Loeb	Citroën Xsara WRC
2007	France	Sébastien Loeb	Citroën C4 WRC
2008	France	Sébastien Loeb	Citroën C4 WRC
2009	France	Sébastien Loeb	Citroën C4 WRC
2010	France	Sébastien Loeb	Citroën C4 WRC
2011	France	Sébastien Loeb	Citroën DS3 WRC
2012	France	Sébastien Loeb	Citroën DS3 WRC
2013	France	Sébastien Ogier	Volkswagen Polo R WRC
2014	France	Sébastien Ogier	Volkswagen Polo R WRC
2015	France	Sébastien Ogier	Volkswagen Polo R WRC
2016	France	Sébastien Ogier	Volkswagen Polo R WRC
2017	France	Sébastien Ogier	Ford Fiesta WRC
2018	France	Sébastien Ogier	Ford Fiesta WRC
2019	Estonia	Ott Tänak	Toyota Yaris WRC
2020	France	Sébastien Ogier	Toyota Yaris WRC
2021	France	Sébastien Ogier	Toyota Yaris WRC
2022	Finland	Kalle Rovanperä	Toyota GR Yaris Rally1
2023	Finland	Kalle Rovanperä	Toyota GR Yaris Rally1
2024	Belgium	Thierry Neuville	Hyundai i20 N Rally1
2025	France	Sébastien Ogier	Toyota GR Yaris Rally1
2026	United Kingdom	Elfyn Evans	Toyota GR Yaris Rally1

=== By driver ===
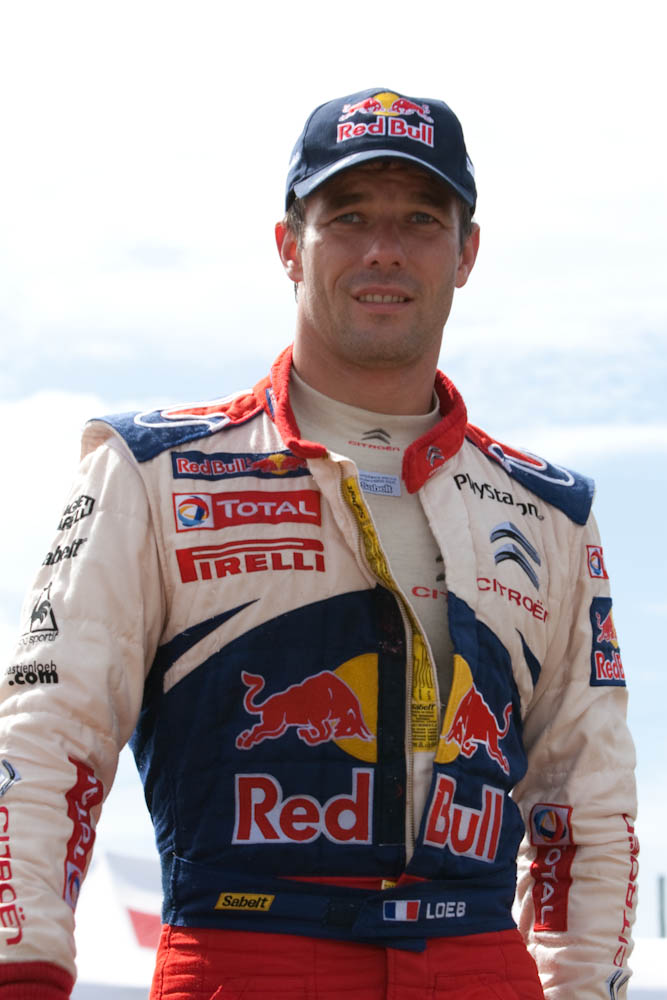
Nine-time champion Sébastien Loeb at the 2009 Rally Australia.

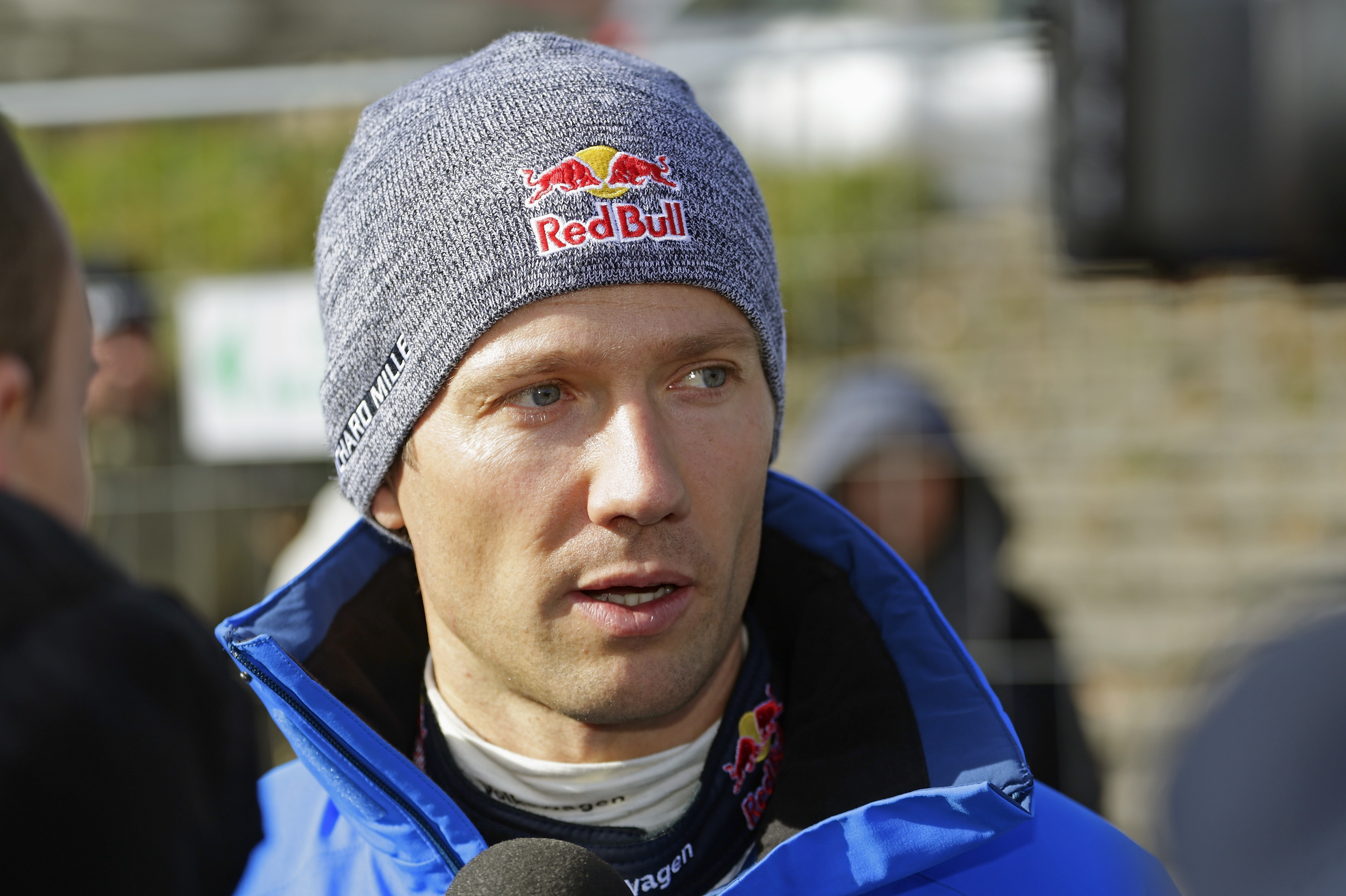
Nine-time champion Sébastien Ogier (pictured at the 2016 Monte Carlo Rally) tied Loeb for most drivers' titles in 2025.

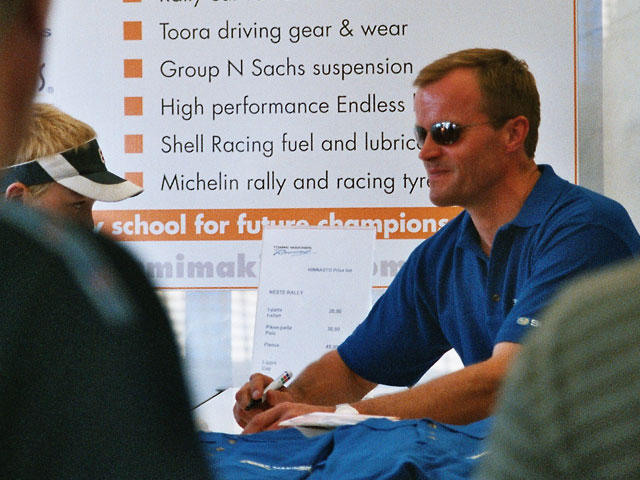
Tommi Mäkinen won four World Rally Championships.

List of World Rally Championship Drivers' Champions by driver
Driver	Total	Seasons
(France) Sébastien Loeb	9	2004, 2005, 2006, 2007, 2008, 2009, 2010, 2011, 2012
(France) Sébastien Ogier	9	2013, 2014, 2015, 2016, 2017, 2018, 2020, 2021, 2025
(Finland) Juha Kankkunen	4	1986, 1987, 1991, 1993
(Finland) Tommi Mäkinen	4	1996, 1997, 1998, 1999
(Germany) Walter Röhrl	2	1980, 1982
(Italy) Miki Biasion	2	1988, 1989
(Spain) Carlos Sainz	2	1990, 1992
(Finland) Marcus Grönholm	2	2000, 2002
(Finland) Kalle Rovanperä	2	2022, 2023
(Italy) Sandro Munari	1	1977
(Finland) Markku Alén	1	1978
(Sweden) Björn Waldegård	1	1979
(Finland) Ari Vatanen	1	1981
(Finland) Hannu Mikkola	1	1983
(Sweden) Stig Blomqvist	1	1984
(Finland) Timo Salonen	1	1985
(France) Didier Auriol	1	1994
(United Kingdom) Colin McRae	1	1995
(United Kingdom) Richard Burns	1	2001
(Norway) Petter Solberg	1	2003
(Estonia) Ott Tänak	1	2019
(Belgium) Thierry Neuville	1	2024
(United Kingdom) Elfyn Evans	1	2026

=== By nationality ===
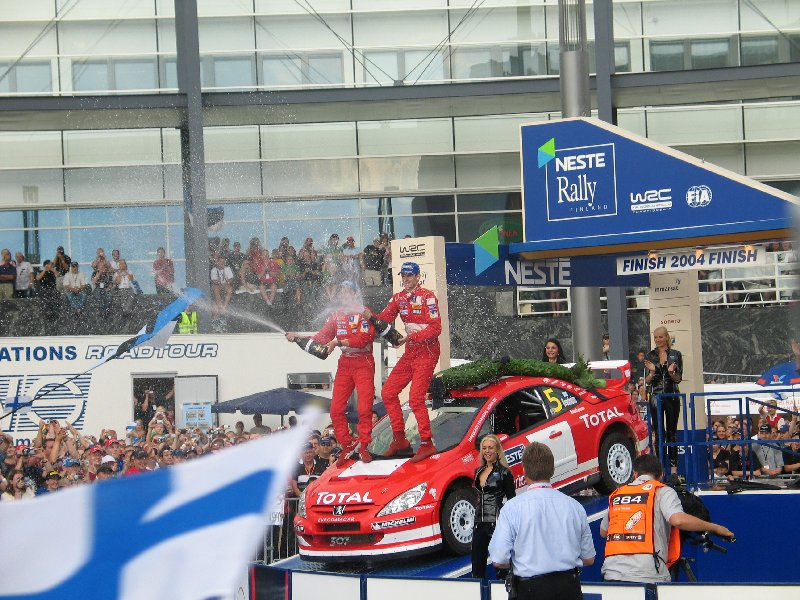
Marcus Grönholm, the seventh Finnish world champion

Championship wins by nationality
Country	Drivers	Total wins
France	3	19
Finland	8	16
United Kingdom	3	3
Italy	2	3
Sweden	2	2
West Germany	1	2
Spain	1	2
Norway	1	1
Estonia	1	1
Belgium	1	1

=== By manufacturer ===
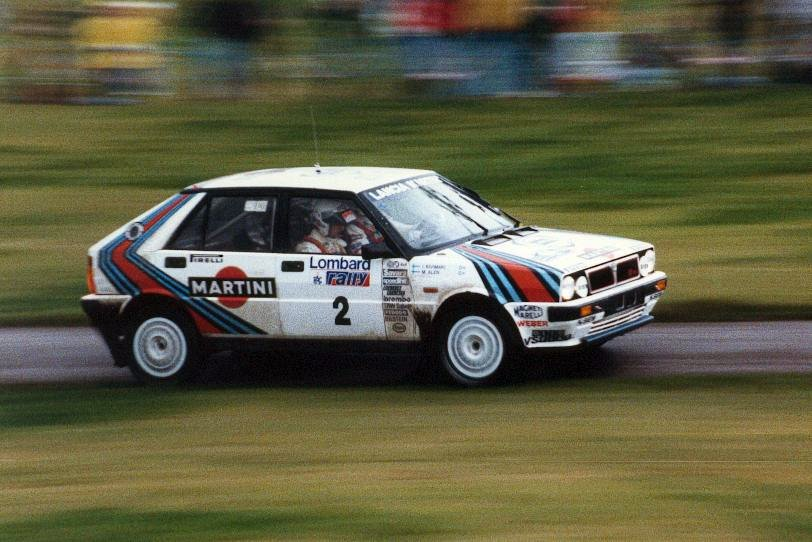
Markku Alén driving a Lancia Delta HF 4WD in 1987. Rally versions of the Delta brought Lancia four drivers' titles.

Privateers and manufacturers counted

Make	Total
(Japan) Toyota	11
(France) Citroën	9
(Italy) Lancia	5
(United Kingdom) Ford/M-Sport	4
(Japan) Mitsubishi	4
(France) Peugeot	4
(Germany) Volkswagen	4
(Japan) Subaru	3
(Germany) Audi	2
(Italy) Fiat	2
(South Korea) Hyundai	1
(Germany) Opel	1

== See also ==
- List of World Rally Championship Co-Drivers' champions
- List of World Rally Championship Manufacturers' champions
- List of World Rally Championship records
