= Tiziano Siviero =

Italian rally co-driver (born 1957)

Personal information
- Nationality: (Italy) Italian
- Born: October 28, 1957 (age 69); Bassano del Grappa, Veneto

World Rally Championship record
- Years active: 1980–1994, 2001
- Driver: (Italy) Miki Biasion (Italy) Simone De Martini
- Teams: Lancia, Ford
- Rallies: 78
- Co-championships: 2 (1988, 1989)
- Rally wins: 16
- Podiums: 39
- First rally: 1980 Rallye Sanremo
- First win: 1986 Rally Argentina
- Last win: 1993 Acropolis Rally
- Last rally: 2001 Rally of Great Britain

Tiziano Siviero (born 28 October 1957 in Bassano del Grappa, Veneto) is an Italian rally co-driver. He is most closely associated with Miki Biasion, with whom he won the 1983 European Rally Championship on Lancia Rally 037, the 1988 World Rally Championship and the 1989 World Rally Championship on Lancia Delta Integrale.

== Personal life ==
He is married and has two children. He and his family formally resided in Monte Carlo, Principality of Monaco before moving to the Italian island of Elba. On 21 September 2022, in the evening, on the island of Elba where he has lived for years, he is involved in a serious accident with his scooter. He is currently hospitalized in serious condition at the hospital in Pisa.

== Career ==
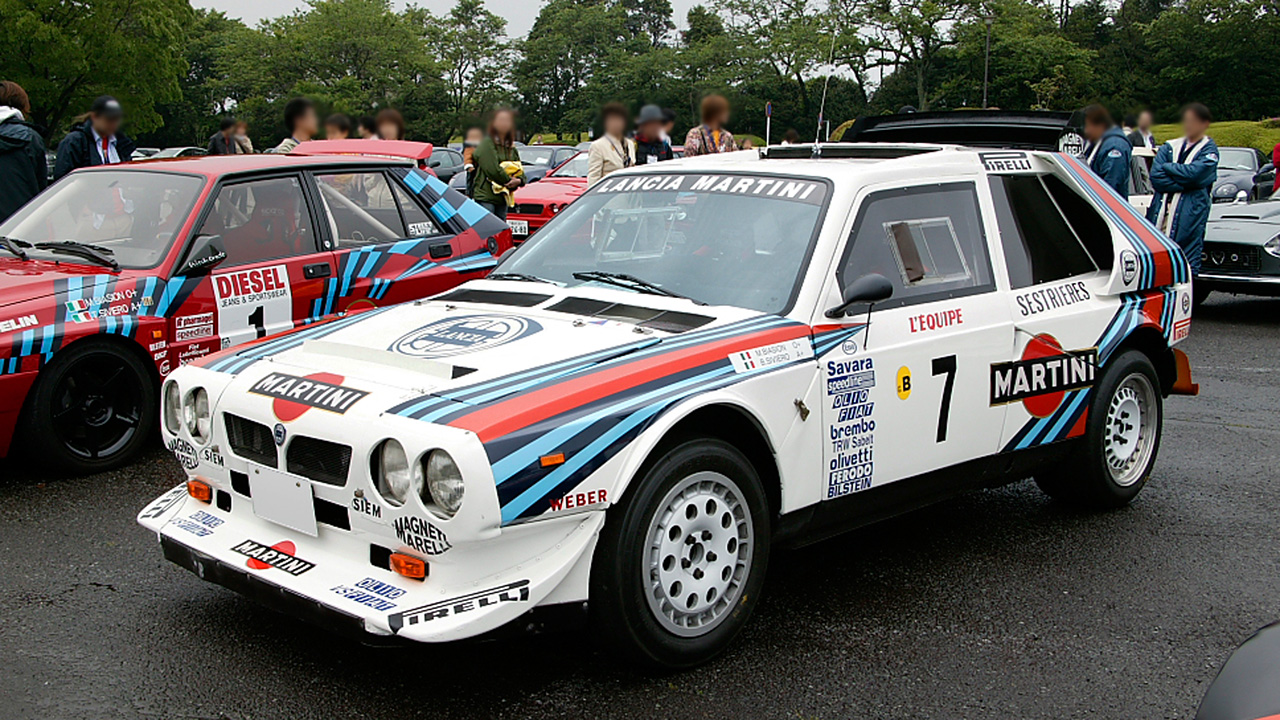
Biasion's Lancia Delta S4.

He started racing in the World Rally Championship since 1979 with Miki Biasion. He was always co-pilot of Miki Biasion for his entire career from 1980 to 2001 in the World Rally Championship, the exception being the 22º Rallye de Portugal Vinho do Porto in 1988, where he was replaced by Carlo Cassina due to health problems.

== WRC victories ==
#	Event	Season	Driver	Car
1	6º Marlboro Rally Argentina	1986	Miki Biasion	Lancia Delta S4
2	(Monaco) 55ème Rallye Automobile de Monte-Carlo	1987	Miki Biasion	Lancia Delta HF 4WD
3	7º Marlboro Rally Argentina	1987	Miki Biasion	Lancia Delta HF 4WD
4	(Italy) 29º Rallye Sanremo	1987	Miki Biasion	Lancia Delta HF 4WD
5	(Kenya) 36th Marlboro Safari Rally	1988	Miki Biasion	Lancia Delta Integrale
6	(Greece) 35th Acropolis Rally	1988	Miki Biasion	Lancia Delta Integrale
7	(United States) 23rd Olympus Rally	1988	Miki Biasion	Lancia Delta Integrale
8	(Italy) 30º Rallye Sanremo - Rallye d'Italia	1988	Miki Biasion	Lancia Delta Integrale
9	(Monaco) 57ème Rallye Automobile de Monte-Carlo	1989	Miki Biasion	Lancia Delta Integrale
10	23º Rallye de Portugal Vinho do Porto	1989	Miki Biasion	Lancia Delta Integrale
11	(Kenya) 37th Marlboro Safari Rally	1989	Miki Biasion	Lancia Delta Integrale
12	(Greece) 36th Acropolis Rally	1989	Miki Biasion	Lancia Delta Integrale
13	(Italy) 31º Rallye Sanremo - Rallye d'Italia	1989	Miki Biasion	Lancia Delta Integrale 16V
14	24º Rally de Portugal Vinho do Porto	1990	Miki Biasion	Lancia Delta Integrale 16V
15	10º Rally Argentina	1990	Miki Biasion	Lancia Delta Integrale 16V
16	(Greece) 40th Acropolis Rally	1993	Miki Biasion	Ford Escort RS Cosworth

== Rally raid ==
2002

- 2nd overall, Italian Baja with Jean-Pierre Fontenay on Mitsubishi Pajero.
- 3rd overall, UAE Desert Challenge with Miki Biasion on Mitsubishi Pajero.

2003

- 2nd overall, Rally of Tunisia with Miki Biasion on Mitsubishi Pajero.
