= Miki Biasion =

Italian rally driver (born 1958)

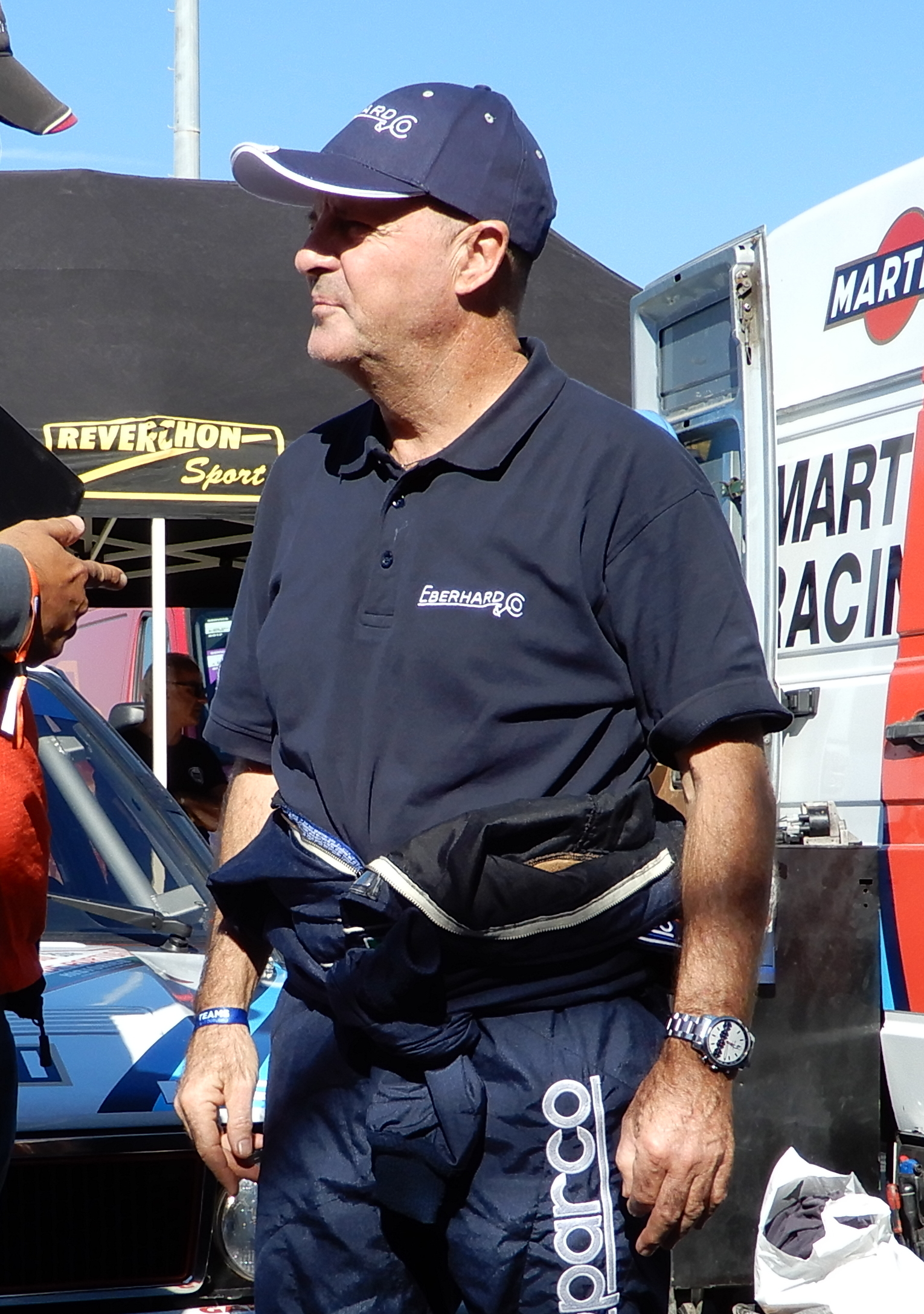
- Biasion at 2018 Estoril Classic Week

Personal information
- Nationality: (Italy) Italian
- Full name: Massimo Biasion
- Born: 7 January 1958 (age 68); Bassano del Grappa, Veneto, Italy

World Rally Championship record
- Years active: 1980–1994
- Co-driver: (Italy) Tiziano Siviero (Italy) Carlo Cassina
- Teams: Lancia, Ford
- Rallies: 78
- Championships: 2 (1988, 1989)
- Rally wins: 17
- Podiums: 40
- Stage wins: 373
- Total points: 768
- First rally: 1980 Rallye Sanremo
- First win: 1986 Rally Argentina
- Last win: 1993 Acropolis Rally
- Last rally: 1994 RAC Rally

Massimo "Miki" Biasion (born 7 January 1958) is an Italian rally driver, two-time World Rally champion.

== Career ==
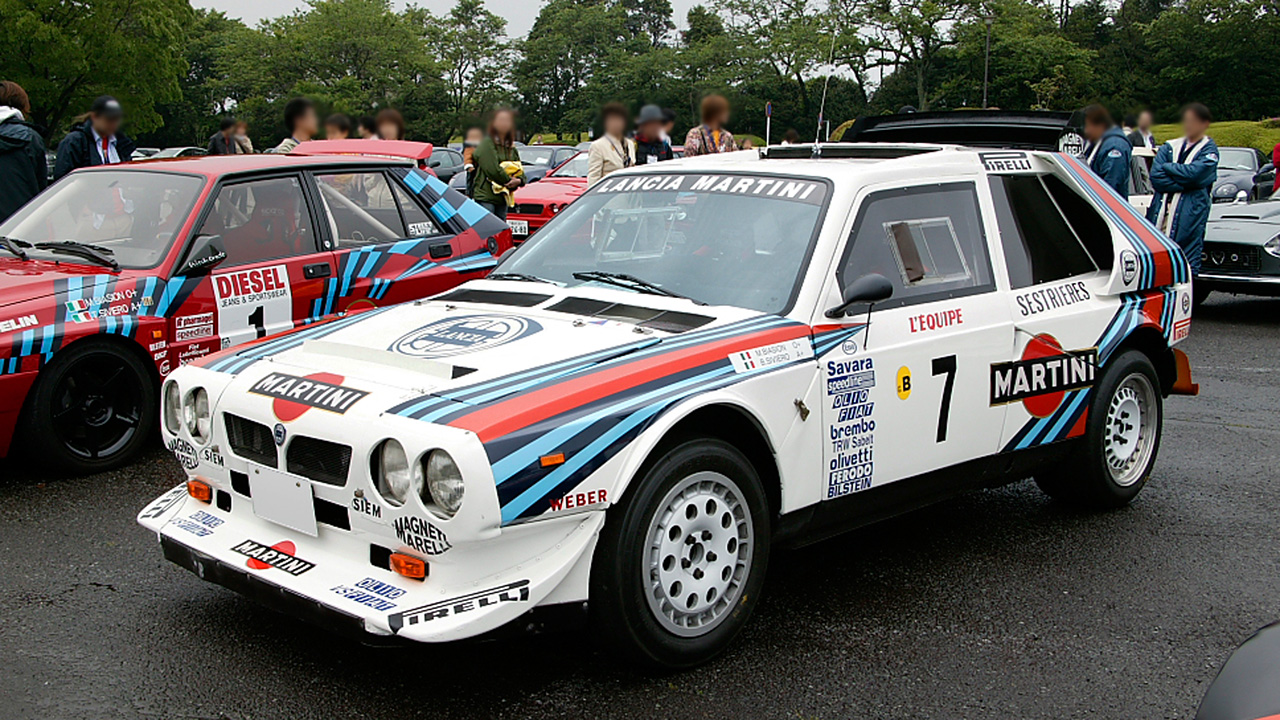
Biasion's Lancia Delta S4.

Biasion was born in Bassano del Grappa, Veneto.

Biasion came to prominence in the early 1980s, winning both the Italian and European Rally Championships in 1983, driving a Lancia 037. He began competing in 1979, in an Opel Kadett GT/E. He was later drafted in to play a key role for the works Lancia World Rally Championship team in the mid-1980s as the squad sought to regroup after previous star driver Henri Toivonen's fatal crash, and would go on to dominate early Group A rallying, taking the world championship in the years 1988 and 1989. At his peak, Biasion was notching victories in almost three quarters of all events he entered. He also was only the second driver to successfully defend his title (after Juha Kankkunen) and the third one to win two titles (after Kankkunen and Walter Röhrl).

After his championship years, Biasion was never able to achieve that level of success again. He failed to win an event for Lancia in 1991, and switched to Ford for 1992 on a contract that made him the highest-paid driver of his day, and gave him some managerial input. The optimism did not last. Biasion reputedly described the Ford Sierra RS Cosworth 4x4 as "a pile of shit" after his first event for the team (the 1992 Monte Carlo Rally), although on the Portuguese Rally he did give the car its best WRC result by finishing second. The following year, driving the new Ford Escort RS Cosworth, he won the Acropolis Rally and led the driver's championship for part of the season.

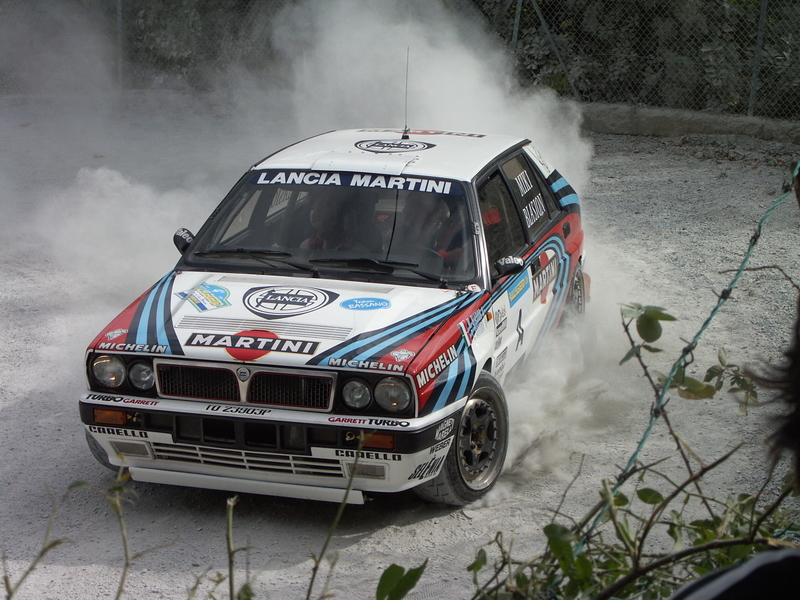
Biasion driving a Lancia Delta Integrale 16v at 2006 Rally Legend in San Marino.

Throughout Biasion's tenure at Ford he was overshadowed by the younger François Delecour, who generally proved to be faster, especially on tarmac. Moreover, Delecour's road accident, which forced him to sit out much of the 1994 season, exposed the weaknesses in the team. Insufficient resources meant that development of the Escort slipped behind its rivals, and Biasion's relationship with the team worsened as the season progressed. He was subsequently dropped for the following year. After contesting a couple of rallies for private teams, he retired quietly at the end of the 1995 season (his two last WRC events were part of the 2LWC prior to the late Colin McRae's honor as 1995 World Rally Champion, but this truly last WRC event was the RAC (now Wales Rally GB) in 1994 when it was won by McRae himself and Didier Auriol's honor as 1994 World Rally Champion).

Throughout his entire career he was co-driven by Tiziano Siviero, the sole exception being the Portuguese Rally of 1988, where Siviero was replaced by Carlo Cassina due to health problems.

He drove for the works Mitsubishi team on the Dakar rally in both 2003 and 2004. In 2003, he finished the event's penultimate stage in third place, but his gearbox seized on the podium. Trying to move and fix the car in that area resulted in a 10-hour penalty. He fell from what was a podium in overall rally time to outside the top 10 in the final standings. In 2004, a roll ended his event - despite making it to service, the team could not fix the Pajero well enough to continue.

He returned to the event in 2006, this time in the truck category. He drove for the manufacturer Iveco team, alongside team-mate Markku Alén. In 2007, he was part of the manufacturer Fiat team, running the diminutive Panda 4x4 ('PanDakar') on the event, alongside team-mate Bruno Saby. He would once again return in the works Iveco team for the 2012 Dakar Rally, winning three stages and finishing sixth overall.

Biasion won the World Truck Championship in 1998 and 1999 driving an Iveco.

== Personal life ==
Biasion was married to Italian rally driver Chantal Galli, who won the Italian women's rally championship several times. They had four children, named Bettina, Isotta, Jacobo, and Olivia. The pair are now divorced, and Biasion is currently married to Paola.

== WRC victories ==
#	Event	Season	Co-driver	Car
1	Rally Argentina	1986	Tiziano Siviero	Lancia Delta S4
2	(Monaco) Rallye Automobile de Monte-Carlo	1987	Tiziano Siviero	Lancia Delta HF 4WD
3	Rally Argentina	1987	Tiziano Siviero	Lancia Delta HF 4WD
4	(Italy) Rallye Sanremo	1987	Tiziano Siviero	Lancia Delta HF 4WD
5	Rallye de Portugal Vinho do Porto	1988	Carlo Cassina	Lancia Delta Integrale
6	(Kenya) Safari Rally	1988	Tiziano Siviero	Lancia Delta Integrale
7	(Greece) Acropolis Rally	1988	Tiziano Siviero	Lancia Delta Integrale
8	(United States) Olympus Rally	1988	Tiziano Siviero	Lancia Delta Integrale
9	(Italy) Rallye Sanremo – Rallye d'Italia	1988	Tiziano Siviero	Lancia Delta Integrale
10	(Monaco) Rallye Automobile de Monte-Carlo	1989	Tiziano Siviero	Lancia Delta Integrale
11	Rallye de Portugal Vinho do Porto	1989	Tiziano Siviero	Lancia Delta Integrale
12	(Kenya) Safari Rally	1989	Tiziano Siviero	Lancia Delta Integrale
13	(Greece) Acropolis Rally	1989	Tiziano Siviero	Lancia Delta Integrale
14	(Italy) Rallye Sanremo – Rallye d'Italia	1989	Tiziano Siviero	Lancia Delta Integrale 16V
15	Rally de Portugal Vinho do Porto	1990	Tiziano Siviero	Lancia Delta Integrale 16V
16	Rally Argentina	1990	Tiziano Siviero	Lancia Delta Integrale 16V
17	(Greece) Acropolis Rally	1993	Tiziano Siviero	Ford Escort RS Cosworth

== Complete WRC results ==
Year	Entrant	Car	1	2	3	4	5	6	7	8	9	10	11	12	13	14	WDC	Points
1980	Miki Biasion	Opel Ascona	MON	SWE	POR	KEN	GRC	ARG	FIN	NZL	ITA; Ret	FRA	GBR	CIV			-	0
1981	Hawk Racing Club	Opel Ascona 400	MON	SWE	POR	KEN	FRA	GRC	ARG	BRA	FIN	ITA; 6	CIV	GBR			33rd	6
1982	Conrero	Opel Ascona 400	MON	SWE	POR	KEN	FRA	GRC	NZL	BRA	FIN	ITA; 8	CIV	GBR			49th	3
1983	Jolly Club Totip	Lancia Rally 037	MON	SWE	POR	KEN	FRA	GRC	NZL	ARG	FIN	ITA; 5	CIV	GBR			21st	8
1984	Jolly Club Totip	Lancia Rally 037	MON; 6	SWE	POR; 4	KEN	FRA; 2	GRC; Ret	NZL	ARG	FIN	ITA; 3	CIV	GBR			6th	43
1985	Jolly Club	Lancia Rally 037	MON; 9	SWE	POR; 2	KEN	FRA; Ret	GRC	NZL	ARG	FIN	ITA; 6	CIV	GBR			12th	23
1986	Lancia Martini	Lancia Delta S4	MON; Ret	SWE	POR; Ret		FRA; Ret	GRC; 2	NZL; 3	ARG; 1	FIN	CIV	ITA; 3^{[1]}	GBR	USA		5th	47
1986	Lancia Martini	Lancia Rally 037				KEN; Ret											5th	47
1987	Lancia Martini	Lancia Delta HF 4WD	MON; 1	SWE	POR; 8	KEN	FRA; 3	GRC; 7	USA; 2	NZL	ARG; 1	FIN	CIV	ITA; 1	GBR		2nd	94
1988	Lancia Martini	Lancia Delta HF 4WD	MON; Ret	SWE													1st	115
1988	Lancia Martini	Lancia Delta Integrale			POR; 1	KEN; 1	FRA	GRC; 1	USA; 1	NZL	ARG; 2	FIN	CIV	ITA; 1	GBR		1st	115
1989	Lancia Martini	Lancia Delta Integrale	SWE	MON; 1	POR; 1	KEN; 1	FRA	GRC; 1	NZL	ARG	FIN; 6	AUS					1st	106
1989	Lancia Martini	Lancia Delta Integrale 16V											ITA; 1	CIV	GBR		1st	106
1990	Lancia Martini	Lancia Delta Integrale 16V	MON; 3	POR; 1	KEN; Ret	FRA	GRC; 3	NZL	ARG; 1	FIN	AUS	ITA; Ret	CIV	GBR; 3			4th	76
1991	Lancia Martini	Lancia Delta Integrale 16V	MON; 2	SWE	POR; 3	KEN; Ret	FRA	GRC; 3	NZL	ARG; 2	FIN	AUS	ITA; 2	CIV	ESP	GBR; Ret	4th	69
1992	Ford Motor Co	Ford Sierra RS Cosworth 4x4	MON; 8	SWE	POR; 2	KEN	FRA; 7	GRC; 3	NZL	ARG	FIN; 5	AUS	ITA; 4	CIV	ESP	GBR; 5	4th	60
1993	Ford Motor Co	Ford Escort RS Cosworth	MON; 3	SWE	POR; 2	KEN	FRA; 7	GRC; 1	ARG; 2	NZL; Ret	FIN	AUS; Ret	ITA; Ret	ESP; 4	GBR		4th	76
1994	Ford Motor Co	Ford Escort RS Cosworth	MON; 4	POR; 3	KEN	FRA; 5	GRC; Ret	ARG; Ret	NZL; Ret	FIN	ITA; 3	GBR; Ret					6th	42

^{1} The results of the 1986 Rallye Sanremo were annulled by the FIA.

Awards and achievements
Preceded by Markku Alén	Autosport; International Rally Driver Award; 1989	Succeeded by Carlos Sainz
Sporting positions
Preceded by Antonio Fassina	European Rally Champion; 1983	Succeeded by Carlo Capone
Preceded by Juha Kankkunen	World Rally Champion; 1988–1989	Succeeded by Carlos Sainz
Preceded by Walter Röhrl	Race of Champions; Classic Master; 1998	Succeeded by Not held
