= Bernard Occelli =

French rally co-driver (born 1961)

Personal information
- Nationality: (France) French
- Full name: Bernard Raymond Occelli
- Born: May 20, 1961 (age 65); Cannes, France

World Rally Championship record
- Years active: 1983–1996
- Driver: (Netherlands) Tycho van Dijk (France) Yves Loubet (France) Didier Auriol (France) Patrick Bernardini
- Teams: Martini Racing; Toyota Castrol Team
- Rallies: 73
- Co-championships: 1 (1994)
- Rally wins: 16
- Podiums: 34
- Stage wins: 431
- First rally: 1983 Tour de Course
- First win: 1988 Tour de Corse
- Last win: 1994 Rallye Sanremo
- Last rally: 1996 Acropolis Rally

Bernard Raymond Occelli (born 20 May 1961) is a former rally co-driver from France.

Born in Cannes, Occelli achieved national fame as the co-driver to Didier Auriol with whom he won the 1994 World Rally Championship. Occelli made his debut at the 1983 Monte Carlo Rally with Swiss driver Tycho van Dijk in a Porsche 911. He first paired up with Auriol the following year in a Renault 5 Turbo. They won the title in 1994 in a Toyota Celica Turbo 4WD.

Occelli continued to appear regularly in the championship until 1996.
