= 2001 Rally Australia =

13th round of the 2001 World Rally Championship

2001 Rally Australia 14th Telstra Rally Australia
Round 13 of the 2001 World Rally Championship season
← Previous event	Next event →
- Host country: Australia
- Rally base: Perth
- Dates run: November 1, 2001 – November 4, 2001
- Stages: 21 (396.77 km; 246.54 miles)
- Stage surface: Gravel
- Overall distance: 1,358.70 km (844.26 miles)

Statistics
- Crews: 73 at start, 51 at finish

Overall results
- Overall winner: (Finland) Marcus Grönholm (Finland) Timo Rautiainen (France) Peugeot Total; Peugeot 206 WRC

The 2001 Rally Australia (formally the 14th Telstra Rally Australia) was the thirteenth round of the 2001 World Rally Championship. The race was held over four days between 1 November and 4 November 2001, and was won by Peugeot's Marcus Grönholm, his 6th win in the World Rally Championship.

== Background ==
=== Entry list ===
No.	Driver	Co-Driver	Entrant	Car	Tyre
World Rally Championship manufacturer entries
1	(Finland) Marcus Grönholm	(Finland) Timo Rautiainen	(France) Peugeot Total	Peugeot 206 WRC	M
2	(France) Didier Auriol	(France) Denis Giraudet	(France) Peugeot Total	Peugeot 206 WRC	M
3	(Spain) Carlos Sainz	(Spain) Luis Moya	(United Kingdom) Ford Motor Co. Ltd.	Ford Focus RS WRC '01	P
4	(United Kingdom) Colin McRae	(United Kingdom) Nicky Grist	(United Kingdom) Ford Motor Co. Ltd.	Ford Focus RS WRC '01	P
5	(United Kingdom) Richard Burns	(United Kingdom) Robert Reid	(Japan) Subaru World Rally Team	Subaru Impreza S7 WRC '01	P
6	(Norway) Petter Solberg	(United Kingdom) Phil Mills	(Japan) Subaru World Rally Team	Subaru Impreza S7 WRC '01	P
7	(Finland) Tommi Mäkinen	(Finland) Timo Hantunen	(Japan) Marlboro Mitsubishi Ralliart	Mitsubishi Lancer WRC	M
8	(Belgium) Freddy Loix	(Belgium) Sven Smeets	(Japan) Marlboro Mitsubishi Ralliart	Mitsubishi Lancer WRC	M
9	(Sweden) Kenneth Eriksson	(Sweden) Staffan Parmander	(South Korea) Hyundai Castrol World Rally Team	Hyundai Accent WRC2	M
10	(United Kingdom) Alister McRae	(United Kingdom) David Senior	(South Korea) Hyundai Castrol World Rally Team	Hyundai Accent WRC2	M
World Rally Championship entries
16	(Finland) Harri Rovanperä	(Finland) Risto Pietiläinen	(France) Peugeot Total	Peugeot 206 WRC	M
17	(France) François Delecour	(France) Daniel Grataloup	(United Kingdom) Ford Motor Co. Ltd.	Ford Focus RS WRC '01	P
18	(Japan) Toshihiro Arai	(Australia) Glenn Macneall	(Japan) Subaru World Rally Team	Subaru Impreza S7 WRC '01	P
19	(France) Gilles Panizzi	(France) Hervé Panizzi	(France) Peugeot Total	Peugeot 206 WRC	M
20	(New Zealand) Peter 'Possum' Bourne	(Australia) Mark Stacey	Subaru Rally Team Australia	Subaru Impreza S6 WRC '00	P
21	(Finland) Pasi Hagström	(Finland) Tero Gardemeister	Toyota Castrol Finland	Toyota Corolla WRC	M
22	(Denmark) Henrik Lundgaard	(Denmark) Jens-Christian Anker	Toyota Castrol Team Denmark	Toyota Corolla WRC	M
23	(Australia) Neal Bates	(Australia) Coral Taylor	(Australia) Neal Bates	Toyota Corolla WRC	—N/a
24	(Oman) Hamed Al-Wahaibi	(New Zealand) Tony Sircombe	Oman Arab World Rally Team	Subaru Impreza S7 WRC '01	—N/a
25	(Saudi Arabia) Abdullah Bakhashab	(United Kingdom) Bobby Willis	Toyota Team Saudi Arabia	Toyota Corolla WRC	M
30	(Austria) Achim Mörtl	(Austria) Stefan Eichhorner	(Austria) Promotor World Rally Team	Subaru Impreza S7 WRC '01	P
36	(United Kingdom) Nigel Heath	(United Kingdom) Steve Lancaster	(United Kingdom) World Rally HIRE	Subaru Impreza S5 WRC '99	—N/a
39	(New Zealand) Stuart Warren	(Australia) Murray Hynes	(New Zealand) Stuart Warren	Mitsubishi Lancer Evo VI	—N/a
43	(Australia) Scott Pedder	(Australia) Rob Beekman	(Australia) Pedders Suspension	Mitsubishi Lancer Evo III	—N/a
51	(Australia) Tolley Challis	(Australia) William Hayes	(Australia) Westec Racing	Mitsubishi Lancer Evo V	—N/a
57	(Australia) Stephen Handbury	(Australia) Dale Moscatt	(Australia) Stephen Handbury	Subaru Impreza Wagon	—N/a
61	(Australia) Jacquiline Dines	(Australia) Gray Marshall	(Australia) Jacquiline Dines	Mitsubishi Lancer Evo III	—N/a
63	(Australia) Simon Kirke	(Australia) Angela Moore	(Australia) Simon Kirke	Subaru Impreza WRX	—N/a
64	(Australia) Keith Hedgeland	(Australia) Toni Feaver	(Australia) Keith Hedgeland	Subaru Impreza 555	—N/a
70	(Australia) Robert Whyatt	(Australia) Malcolm Cox	(Australia) Robert Whyatt	Mitsubishi Lancer Evo III	—N/a
Group N Cup entries
26	(Australia) Cody Crocker	(Australia) Greg Foletta	Subaru Rally Team Australia	Subaru Impreza STI N8	P
27	(Finland) Juha Kangas	(Finland) Mika Ovaskainen	(Finland) Juha Kangas	Mitsubishi Lancer Evo VI	—N/a
28	(Australia) Ed Ordynski	(Australia) Iain Stewart	(Japan) Mitsubishi Ralliart	Mitsubishi Lancer Evo VI	M
29	(Finland) Marko Ipatti	(Finland) Karri Marttila	(Australia) Raceworx	Subaru Impreza STI	—N/a
31	(Austria) Manfred Stohl	(Austria) Peter Müller	(Austria) Manfred Stohl	Mitsubishi Lancer Evo VI	—N/a
32	(Argentina) Gabriel Pozzo	(Argentina) Daniel Stillo	(Italy) Top Run SRL	Mitsubishi Lancer Evo VI	—N/a
33	(Argentina) Marcos Ligato	(Argentina) Rubén García	(Italy) Top Run SRL	Mitsubishi Lancer Evo VI	—N/a
34	(Sweden) Stig Blomqvist	(Venezuela) Ana Goñi	(United Kingdom) David Sutton Cars Ltd	Mitsubishi Lancer Evo VI	—N/a
37	(United Kingdom) Natalie Barratt	(New Zealand) Chris Patterson	(United Kingdom) Natalie Barratt Rallysport	Mitsubishi Lancer Evo VI	—N/a
38	(Australia) Dean Herridge	(Australia) Jim Carlton	(Australia) Les Walkden Racing	Subaru Impreza WRX	—N/a
40	(Australia) Simon Evans	(Australia) Sue Evans	(Australia) Raceworx	Subaru Impreza STI	—N/a
41	(Australia) Spencer Lowndes	(Australia) Chris Randell	(Japan) Mitsubishi Ralliart	Mitsubishi Lancer Evo VI	—N/a
42	(Italy) Giovanni Manfrinato	(Italy) Claudio Condotta	(Italy) Top Run SRL	Mitsubishi Lancer Evo VI	—N/a
44	(Australia) Mark Thompson	(Australia) David Boddy	(Australia) Mark Thompson	Mitsubishi Lancer Evo V	—N/a
45	(Belgium) François Duval	(Belgium) Jean-Marc Fortin	(Belgium) François Duval	Mitsubishi Carisma GT Evo VI	—N/a
46	(New Zealand) Reece Jones	(New Zealand) Leo Bult	(New Zealand) Reece Jones	Mitsubishi Lancer Evo VI	—N/a
47	(Italy) Luca Baldini	(Italy) Massimo Agostinelli	(Italy) Top Run SRL	Mitsubishi Lancer Evo VI	—N/a
48	(Australia) Martin Lintott	(Australia) Tony Jackson	(Australia) Lincorp Automotive	Subaru Impreza WRX	—N/a
49	(Japan) Fumio Nutahara	(Japan) Satoshi Hayashi	(Japan) Advan-Piaa Rally Team	Mitsubishi Lancer Evo VII	Y
50	(Australia) Sam Brand	(Australia) Tim Batten	(Australia) Sam Brand	Subaru Impreza WRX	—N/a
52	(Switzerland) Jean-Philippe Patthey	(Switzerland) Claude Alain Besse	(Switzerland) Scuderia Chicco d'Oro	Mitsubishi Lancer Evo VI	—N/a
53	(Australia) Dennis Dunlop	(Australia) Jacquie Dunlop	(Australia) Dennis Dunlop	Mitsubishi Lancer Evo VI	—N/a
54	(Australia) David Hills	(Australia) Lyndall Drake	(Australia) Australian Plastic Profiles	Mitsubishi Lancer Evo V	—N/a
56	(Australia) Steve Forsberg	(Australia) Paul van der Mey	(Australia) Steve Forsberg	Mitsubishi Lancer Evo VI	—N/a
58	(Belgium) Bob Colsoul	(Belgium) Tom Colsoul	(Belgium) Bob Colsoul	Mitsubishi Lancer Evo VI	—N/a
59	(Japan) Atsushi Masumura	(Japan) Osamu Yoda	(Japan) Super Alex Troop	Mitsubishi Lancer Evo VI	—N/a
60	(Japan) Haruo Takakuwa	(Australia) Paul Flintoft	(Japan) Takayama College	Subaru Impreza WRX	—N/a
62	(Australia) Michael Anderson	(Australia) Melissa Anderson	(Australia) Michael Anderson	Mitsubishi Lancer Evo IV	—N/a
65	(Australia) Jim Marden	(Australia) Stuart Percival	(Japan) Takayama College	Subaru Impreza 555	—N/a
66	(United Kingdom) Jeremy Vaughan	(Australia) Jonathon Mortimer	(Australia) Maximum Motorsport	Subaru Impreza WRX	—N/a
69	(Japan) Ryo Funaki	(Japan) Hiroyasu Sonoda	(Japan) Ryo Funaki	Subaru Vivio RX-R	—N/a
71	(Australia) Rick Powell	(Australia) Paul Bennett	(Australia) Rick Powell	Mitsubishi Lancer Evo III	—N/a
72	(Australia) Shane Dirou	(Australia) Hanna Drury	(Australia) Maximum Motorsport	Mitsubishi Lancer Evo III	—N/a
73	(Australia) Christopher Anderson	(Australia) Joel Lithgo	(Australia) Christopher Anderson	Nissan Sunny GTI	—N/a
74	(Australia) John Hendry	(Australia) Andrew Wilson	(Australia) John Hendry	Proton Satria	—N/a
75	(Japan) Kunio Takeuchi	(Australia) Michael Hawiley	(Japan) All Student University	Subaru Vivio RX-R	—N/a
76	(Australia) Scott Clarke	(Australia) Justin Doney	(Australia) SAFER WA	Hyundai Excel	—N/a
77	(Australia) David Kendall	(Australia) Jennifer Kendall-Stewart	(Australia) David Kendall	Subaru Impreza WRX	—N/a
79	(Australia) Duane Partridge	(Australia) Glen Hancock	(Australia) Office of Youth Affairs	Daihatsu Charade GTi	—N/a

=== Itinerary ===
All dates and times are AWST (UTC+8).

Date	Time	No.	Stage name	Distance
Leg 1 — 149.96 km
1 November	18:42	SS1	Langley Park Super 1	2.20 km
2 November	10:27	SS2	Helena North 1	24.14 km
2 November	10:53	SS3	Helena South 1	18.43 km
2 November	12:00	SS4	Kev's	9.56 km
2 November	12:39	SS5	Beraking	26.46 km
2 November	13:27	SS6	Flynns Short	19.98 km
2 November	15:32	SS7	Helena North 2	24.14 km
2 November	15:58	SS8	Helena South 2	18.43 km
2 November	16:23	SS9	Atkins	4.42 km
2 November	19:30	SS10	Langley Park Super 2	2.20 km
Leg 2 — 141.12 km
3 November	08:36	SS11	Stirling East	35.48 km
3 November	09:23	SS12	Brunswick	16.63 km
3 November	11:23	SS13	Wellington Dam	45.42 km
3 November	14:07	SS14	Harvey Weir	6.97 km
3 November	14:28	SS15	Stirling West	15.89 km
3 November	16:14	SS16	Murray Pines	18.53 km
3 November	19:45	SS17	Langley Park Super 3	2.20 km
Leg 3 — 105.69 km
4 November	07:59	SS18	Bannister West	34.57 km
4 November	09:07	SS19	Bannister North	36.84 km
4 November	10:32	SS20	Bannister South	28.65 km
4 November	12:35	SS21	Michelin TV Stage	5.63 km

== Results ==
=== Overall ===
Pos.	No.	Driver	Co-driver	Team	Car	Time	Difference	Points
1	1	(Finland) Marcus Grönholm	(Finland) Timo Rautiainen	(France) Peugeot Total	Peugeot 206 WRC	3:17:01.3		10
2	5	(United Kingdom) Richard Burns	(United Kingdom) Robert Reid	(Japan) Subaru World Rally Team	Subaru Impreza S7 WRC '01	3:17:41.7	+40.4	6
3	2	(France) Didier Auriol	(France) Denis Giraudet	(France) Peugeot Total	Peugeot 206 WRC	3:18:21.4	+1:20.1	4
4	16	(Finland) Harri Rovanperä	(Finland) Risto Pietiläinen	(France) Peugeot Total	Peugeot 206 WRC	3:18:32.2	+1:30.9	3
5	4	(United Kingdom) Colin McRae	(United Kingdom) Nicky Grist	(United Kingdom) Ford Motor Co. Ltd.	Ford Focus RS WRC '01	3:18:41.3	+1:40.0	2
6	7	(Finland) Tommi Mäkinen	(Finland) Timo Hantunen	(Japan) Marlboro Mitsubishi Ralliart	Mitsubishi Lancer WRC	3:20:04.0	+3:02.7	1

=== World Rally Cars ===
==== Classification ====
Position		No.	Driver	Co-driver	Entrant	Car	Time	Difference	Points
Event	Class	No.	Driver	Co-driver	Entrant	Car	Time	Difference	Points
1	1	1	(Finland) Marcus Grönholm	(Finland) Timo Rautiainen	(France) Peugeot Total	Peugeot 206 WRC	3:17:01.3		10
2	2	5	(United Kingdom) Richard Burns	(United Kingdom) Robert Reid	(Japan) Subaru World Rally Team	Subaru Impreza S7 WRC '01	3:17:41.7	+40.4	6
3	3	2	(France) Didier Auriol	(France) Denis Giraudet	(France) Peugeot Total	Peugeot 206 WRC	3:18:21.4	+1:20.1	4
5	4	4	(United Kingdom) Colin McRae	(United Kingdom) Nicky Grist	(United Kingdom) Ford Motor Co. Ltd.	Ford Focus RS WRC '01	3:18:41.3	+1:40.0	2
6	5	7	(Finland) Tommi Mäkinen	(Finland) Timo Hantunen	(Japan) Marlboro Mitsubishi Ralliart	Mitsubishi Lancer WRC	3:20:04.0	+3:02.7	1
7	6	6	(Norway) Petter Solberg	(United Kingdom) Phil Mills	(Japan) Subaru World Rally Team	Subaru Impreza S7 WRC '01	3:20:42.5	+3:41.2	0
8	7	3	(Spain) Carlos Sainz	(Spain) Luis Moya	(United Kingdom) Ford Motor Co. Ltd.	Ford Focus RS WRC '01	3:22:00.5	+4:59.2	0
10	8	10	(United Kingdom) Alister McRae	(United Kingdom) David Senior	(South Korea) Hyundai Castrol World Rally Team	Hyundai Accent WRC2	3:24:33.0	+7:31.7	0
11	9	8	(Belgium) Freddy Loix	(Belgium) Sven Smeets	(Japan) Marlboro Mitsubishi Ralliart	Mitsubishi Lancer WRC	3:24:54.3	+7:53.0	0
12	10	9	(Sweden) Kenneth Eriksson	(Sweden) Staffan Parmander	(South Korea) Hyundai Castrol World Rally Team	Hyundai Accent WRC2	3:25:17.0	+8:15.7	0

==== Special stages ====
Day	Stage	Stage name	Length	Winner	Car	Time	Class leaders
Leg 1 (1 Nov)	SS1	Langley Park Super 1	2.20 km	(France) Didier Auriol (Spain) Carlos Sainz	Peugeot 206 WRC; Ford Focus RS WRC '01	1:30.7	(France) Didier Auriol (Spain) Carlos Sainz
Leg 1 (2 Nov)	SS2	Helena North 1	24.14 km	(Finland) Marcus Grönholm	Peugeot 206 WRC	13:43.6	(Finland) Marcus Grönholm
Leg 1 (2 Nov)	SS3	Helena South 1	18.43 km	(Finland) Marcus Grönholm (Finland) Harri Rovanperä	Peugeot 206 WRC; Peugeot 206 WRC	9:42.7	(Finland) Marcus Grönholm
Leg 1 (2 Nov)	SS4	Kev's	9.56 km	(Spain) Carlos Sainz	Ford Focus RS WRC '01	6:01.5	(Finland) Marcus Grönholm
Leg 1 (2 Nov)	SS5	Beraking	26.46 km	(United Kingdom) Richard Burns	Subaru Impreza S7 WRC '01	14:52.2	(Finland) Marcus Grönholm
Leg 1 (2 Nov)	SS6	Flynns Short	19.98 km	(France) Didier Auriol	Peugeot 206 WRC	12:08.7	(United Kingdom) Colin McRae
Leg 1 (2 Nov)	SS7	Helena North 2	24.14 km	(France) Didier Auriol	Peugeot 206 WRC	13:29.4	(Finland) Marcus Grönholm
Leg 1 (2 Nov)	SS8	Helena South 2	18.43 km	(Spain) Carlos Sainz (United Kingdom) Richard Burns	Ford Focus RS WRC '01; Subaru Impreza S7 WRC '01	9:34.2	(Finland) Marcus Grönholm
Leg 1 (2 Nov)	SS9	Atkins	4.42 km	(Spain) Carlos Sainz	Ford Focus RS WRC '01	3:01.3	(Finland) Marcus Grönholm
Leg 1 (2 Nov)	SS10	Langley Park Super 2	2.20 km	(France) Didier Auriol (Norway) Petter Solberg	Peugeot 206 WRC; Subaru Impreza S7 WRC '01	1:30.8	(Finland) Marcus Grönholm
Leg 2 (3 Nov)	SS11	Stirling East	35.48 km	(Finland) Marcus Grönholm	Peugeot 206 WRC	19:38.8	(Finland) Marcus Grönholm
Leg 2 (3 Nov)	SS12	Brunswick	16.63 km	(Finland) Marcus Grönholm	Peugeot 206 WRC	9:08.5	(Finland) Marcus Grönholm
Leg 2 (3 Nov)	SS13	Wellington Dam	45.42 km	Stage cancelled			(Finland) Marcus Grönholm
Leg 2 (3 Nov)	SS14	Harvey Weir	6.97 km	(Finland) Marcus Grönholm	Peugeot 206 WRC	3:47.8	(Finland) Marcus Grönholm
Leg 2 (3 Nov)	SS15	Stirling West	15.89 km	(Finland) Marcus Grönholm	Peugeot 206 WRC	9:20.0	(Finland) Marcus Grönholm
Leg 2 (3 Nov)	SS16	Murray Pines	18.53 km	(Finland) Marcus Grönholm	Peugeot 206 WRC	10:40.4	(Finland) Marcus Grönholm
Leg 2 (3 Nov)	SS17	Langley Park Super 3	2.20 km	(France) Didier Auriol	Peugeot 206 WRC	1:29.7	(Finland) Marcus Grönholm
Leg 3 (4 Nov)	SS18	Bannister West	34.57 km	(United Kingdom) Richard Burns	Subaru Impreza S7 WRC '01	17:22.7	(Finland) Marcus Grönholm
Leg 3 (4 Nov)	SS19	Bannister North	36.84 km	(United Kingdom) Colin McRae	Ford Focus RS WRC '01	19:26.6	(Finland) Marcus Grönholm
Leg 3 (4 Nov)	SS20	Bannister South	28.65 km	(United Kingdom) Colin McRae	Ford Focus RS WRC '01	16:32.1	(Finland) Marcus Grönholm
Leg 3 (4 Nov)	SS21	Michelin TV Stage	5.63 km	(United Kingdom) Colin McRae	Ford Focus RS WRC '01	3:28.1	(Finland) Marcus Grönholm

==== Championship standings ====
Pos.	Drivers' championships			Co-drivers' championships			Manufacturers' championships		
Pos.	Move	Driver	Points	Move	Co-driver	Points	Move	Manufacturer	Points
1		(United Kingdom) Colin McRae	42		(United Kingdom) Nicky Grist	42	1	(France) Peugeot Total	90
2		(Finland) Tommi Mäkinen	41		(Finland) Risto Mannisenmäki	40	1	(United Kingdom) Ford Motor Co. Ltd.	86
3		(United Kingdom) Richard Burns	40		(United Kingdom) Robert Reid	40		(Japan) Marlboro Mitsubishi Ralliart	69
4		(Spain) Carlos Sainz	33		(Spain) Luis Moya	33		(Japan) Subaru World Rally Team	62
5		(Finland) Harri Rovanperä	30		(Finland) Risto Pietiläinen	30		(Czech Republic) Škoda Motorsport	15

=== FIA Cup for Production Rally Drivers ===
==== Classification ====
Position		No.	Driver	Co-driver	Entrant	Car	Time	Difference	Points
Event	Class	No.	Driver	Co-driver	Entrant	Car	Time	Difference	Points
17	1	28	(Australia) Ed Ordynski	(Australia) Iain Stewart	(Japan) Mitsubishi Ralliart	Mitsubishi Lancer Evo VI	3:34:27.2		10
18	2	32	(Argentina) Gabriel Pozzo	(Argentina) Daniel Stillo	(Italy) Top Run SRL	Mitsubishi Lancer Evo VI	3:34:48.5	+21.3	6
19	3	45	(Belgium) François Duval	(Belgium) Jean-Marc Fortin	(Belgium) François Duval	Mitsubishi Carisma GT Evo VI	3:35:19.0	+51.8	4
20	4	27	(Finland) Juha Kangas	(Finland) Mika Ovaskainen	(Finland) Juha Kangas	Mitsubishi Lancer Evo VI	3:35:23.5	+56.3	3
21	5	26	(Australia) Cody Crocker	(Australia) Greg Foletta	Subaru Rally Team Australia	Subaru Impreza STI N8	3:37:22.6	+2:55.4	2
22	6	31	(Austria) Manfred Stohl	(Austria) Peter Müller	(Austria) Manfred Stohl	Mitsubishi Lancer Evo VI	3:38:22.6	+3:55.4	1
23	7	34	(Sweden) Stig Blomqvist	(Venezuela) Ana Goñi	(United Kingdom) David Sutton Cars Ltd	Mitsubishi Lancer Evo VI	3:40:39.6	+6:12.4	0
24	8	38	(Australia) Dean Herridge	(Australia) Jim Carlton	(Australia) Les Walkden Racing	Subaru Impreza WRX	3:41:05.8	+6:38.6	0
25	9	42	(Italy) Giovanni Manfrinato	(Italy) Claudio Condotta	(Italy) Top Run SRL	Mitsubishi Lancer Evo VI	3:41:24.9	+6:57.7	0
26	10	29	(Finland) Marko Ipatti	(Finland) Karri Marttila	(Australia) Raceworx	Subaru Impreza STI	3:42:54.8	+8:27.6	0
27	11	33	(Argentina) Marcos Ligato	(Argentina) Rubén García	(Italy) Top Run SRL	Mitsubishi Lancer Evo VI	3:43:23.3	+8:56.1	0
28	12	46	(New Zealand) Reece Jones	(New Zealand) Leo Bult	(New Zealand) Reece Jones	Mitsubishi Lancer Evo VI	3:45:32.0	+11:04.8	0
30	13	44	(Australia) Mark Thompson	(Australia) David Boddy	(Australia) Mark Thompson	Mitsubishi Lancer Evo V	3:47:44.6	+13:17.4	0
31	14	58	(Belgium) Bob Colsoul	(Belgium) Tom Colsoul	(Belgium) Bob Colsoul	Mitsubishi Lancer Evo VI	3:48:43.1	+14:15.9	0
32	15	54	(Australia) David Hills	(Australia) Lyndall Drake	(Australia) Australian Plastic Profiles	Mitsubishi Lancer Evo V	3:50:31.8	+16:04.6	0
33	16	65	(Australia) Jim Marden	(Australia) Stuart Percival	(Japan) Takayama College	Subaru Impreza 555	3:53:15.6	+18:48.4	0
34	17	47	(Italy) Luca Baldini	(Italy) Massimo Agostinelli	(Italy) Top Run SRL	Mitsubishi Lancer Evo VI	3:53:48.5	+19:21.3	0
35	18	53	(Australia) Dennis Dunlop	(Australia) Jacquie Dunlop	(Australia) Dennis Dunlop	Mitsubishi Lancer Evo VI	3:54:54.1	+20:26.9	0
36	19	37	(United Kingdom) Natalie Barratt	(New Zealand) Chris Patterson	(United Kingdom) Natalie Barratt Rallysport	Mitsubishi Lancer Evo VI	3:59:10.9	+24:43.7	0
37	20	62	(Australia) Michael Anderson	(Australia) Melissa Anderson	(Australia) Michael Anderson	Mitsubishi Lancer Evo IV	4:02:34.0	+28:06.8	0
39	21	60	(Japan) Haruo Takakuwa	(Australia) Paul Flintoft	(Japan) Takayama College	Subaru Impreza WRX	4:07:32.8	+33:05.6	0
42	22	72	(Australia) Shane Dirou	(Australia) Hanna Drury	(Australia) Maximum Motorsport	Mitsubishi Lancer Evo III	4:11:01.2	+36:34.0	0
45	23	71	(Australia) Rick Powell	(Australia) Paul Bennett	(Australia) Rick Powell	Mitsubishi Lancer Evo III	4:23:28.9	+49:01.7	0
46	24	74	(Australia) John Hendry	(Australia) Andrew Wilson	(Australia) John Hendry	Proton Satria	4:30:34.9	+56:07.7	0
47	25	69	(Japan) Ryo Funaki	(Japan) Hiroyasu Sonoda	(Japan) Ryo Funaki	Subaru Vivio RX-R	4:33:19.0	+58:51.8	0
50	26	79	(Australia) Duane Partridge	(Australia) Glen Hancock	(Australia) Office of Youth Affairs	Daihatsu Charade GTi	5:07:19.1	+1:32:51.9	0
Retired SS20		75	(Japan) Kunio Takeuchi	(Australia) Michael Hawiley	(Japan) All Student University	Subaru Vivio RX-R	Suspension		0
Retired SS16		40	(Australia) Simon Evans	(Australia) Sue Evans	(Australia) Raceworx	Subaru Impreza STI	Gearbox		0
Retired SS15		52	(Switzerland) Jean-Philippe Patthey	(Switzerland) Claude Alain Besse	(Switzerland) Scuderia Chicco d'Oro	Mitsubishi Lancer Evo VI	Gearbox		0
Retired SS15		66	(United Kingdom) Jeremy Vaughan	(Australia) Jonathon Mortimer	(Australia) Maximum Motorsport	Subaru Impreza WRX	Gearbox		0
Retired SS12		48	(Australia) Martin Lintott	(Australia) Tony Jackson	(Australia) Lincorp Automotive	Subaru Impreza WRX	Accident		0
Retired SS7		73	(Australia) Christopher Anderson	(Australia) Joel Lithgo	(Australia) Christopher Anderson	Nissan Sunny GTI	Accident		0
Retired SS6		76	(Australia) Scott Clarke	(Australia) Justin Doney	(Australia) SAFER WA	Hyundai Excel	Accident		0
Retired SS5		49	(Japan) Fumio Nutahara	(Japan) Satoshi Hayashi	(Japan) Advan-Piaa Rally Team	Mitsubishi Lancer Evo VII	Accident		0
Retired SS5		50	(Australia) Sam Brand	(Australia) Tim Batten	(Australia) Sam Brand	Subaru Impreza WRX	Electrical		0
Retired SS5		56	(Australia) Steve Forsberg	(Australia) Paul van der Mey	(Australia) Steve Forsberg	Mitsubishi Lancer Evo VI	Accident		0
Retired SS5		59	(Japan) Atsushi Masumura	(Japan) Osamu Yoda	(Japan) Super Alex Troop	Mitsubishi Lancer Evo VI	Accident		0
Retired SS2		41	(Australia) Spencer Lowndes	(Australia) Chris Randell	(Japan) Mitsubishi Ralliart	Mitsubishi Lancer Evo VI	Suspension		0
Retired SS1		77	(Australia) David Kendall	(Australia) Jennifer Kendall-Stewart	(Australia) David Kendall	Subaru Impreza WRX	Driveshaft		0

==== Special stages ====
Day	Stage	Stage name	Length	Winner	Car	Time	Class leaders
Leg 1 (1 Nov)	SS1	Langley Park Super 1	2.20 km	(Austria) Manfred Stohl	Mitsubishi Lancer Evo VI	1:35.8	(Austria) Manfred Stohl
Leg 1 (2 Nov)	SS2	Helena North 1	24.14 km	(Austria) Manfred Stohl	Mitsubishi Lancer Evo VI	14:46.6	(Austria) Manfred Stohl
Leg 1 (2 Nov)	SS3	Helena South 1	18.43 km	(Australia) Ed Ordynski	Mitsubishi Lancer Evo VI	10:29.2	(Austria) Manfred Stohl
Leg 1 (2 Nov)	SS4	Kev's	9.56 km	(Japan) Fumio Nutahara	Mitsubishi Lancer Evo VII	6:28.4	(Austria) Manfred Stohl
Leg 1 (2 Nov)	SS5	Beraking	26.46 km	(Australia) Ed Ordynski	Mitsubishi Lancer Evo VI	16:06.1	(Austria) Manfred Stohl
Leg 1 (2 Nov)	SS6	Flynns Short	19.98 km	(Australia) Ed Ordynski (Austria) Manfred Stohl	Mitsubishi Lancer Evo VI; Mitsubishi Lancer Evo VI	13:00.0	(Austria) Manfred Stohl
Leg 1 (2 Nov)	SS7	Helena North 2	24.14 km	(Australia) Ed Ordynski	Mitsubishi Lancer Evo VI	14:39.1	(Australia) Ed Ordynski
Leg 1 (2 Nov)	SS8	Helena South 2	18.43 km	(Australia) Ed Ordynski	Mitsubishi Lancer Evo VI	10:20.9	(Australia) Ed Ordynski
Leg 1 (2 Nov)	SS9	Atkins	4.42 km	(Australia) Ed Ordynski	Mitsubishi Lancer Evo VI	3:14.3	(Australia) Ed Ordynski
Leg 1 (2 Nov)	SS10	Langley Park Super 2	2.20 km	(Austria) Manfred Stohl	Mitsubishi Lancer Evo VI	1:35.4	(Australia) Ed Ordynski
Leg 2 (3 Nov)	SS11	Stirling East	35.48 km	(Austria) Manfred Stohl	Mitsubishi Lancer Evo VI	20:54.0	(Australia) Ed Ordynski
Leg 2 (3 Nov)	SS12	Brunswick	16.63 km	(Austria) Manfred Stohl	Mitsubishi Lancer Evo VI	9:57.4	(Australia) Ed Ordynski
Leg 2 (3 Nov)	SS13	Wellington Dam	45.42 km	Stage cancelled			(Australia) Ed Ordynski
Leg 2 (3 Nov)	SS14	Harvey Weir	6.97 km	(Austria) Manfred Stohl	Mitsubishi Lancer Evo VI	4:08.0	(Australia) Ed Ordynski
Leg 2 (3 Nov)	SS15	Stirling West	15.89 km	(Austria) Manfred Stohl	Mitsubishi Lancer Evo VI	9:57.3	(Australia) Ed Ordynski
Leg 2 (3 Nov)	SS16	Murray Pines	18.53 km	(Austria) Manfred Stohl	Mitsubishi Lancer Evo VI	11:24.9	(Australia) Ed Ordynski
Leg 2 (3 Nov)	SS17	Langley Park Super 3	2.20 km	(Argentina) Gabriel Pozzo	Mitsubishi Lancer Evo VI	1:35.1	(Australia) Ed Ordynski
Leg 3 (4 Nov)	SS18	Bannister West	34.57 km	(Austria) Manfred Stohl	Mitsubishi Lancer Evo VI	18:35.3	(Australia) Ed Ordynski
Leg 3 (4 Nov)	SS19	Bannister North	36.84 km	(Finland) Juha Kangas	Mitsubishi Lancer Evo VI	21:09.3	(Australia) Ed Ordynski
Leg 3 (4 Nov)	SS20	Bannister South	28.65 km	(Belgium) François Duval	Mitsubishi Carisma GT Evo VI	17:52.2	(Australia) Ed Ordynski
Leg 3 (4 Nov)	SS21	Michelin TV Stage	5.63 km	(Austria) Manfred Stohl	Mitsubishi Lancer Evo VI	3:44.7	(Australia) Ed Ordynski

==== Championship standings ====
- **Bold text** indicates 2001 World Champions.

Pos.	Drivers' championships		
Pos.	Move	Driver	Points
1		(Argentina) **Gabriel Pozzo**	71
2		(Uruguay) Gustavo Trelles	36
3		(Austria) Manfred Stohl	23
4		(Argentina) Marcos Ligato	22
5		(Sweden) Stig Blomqvist	14
