= 1993 World Rally Championship =

21st season of the FIA World Rally Championship

Champions
- World Drivers' Champion: Juha Kankkunen
- World Manufacturers' Champion: Toyota

Seasons
- ← 1992 1994 →

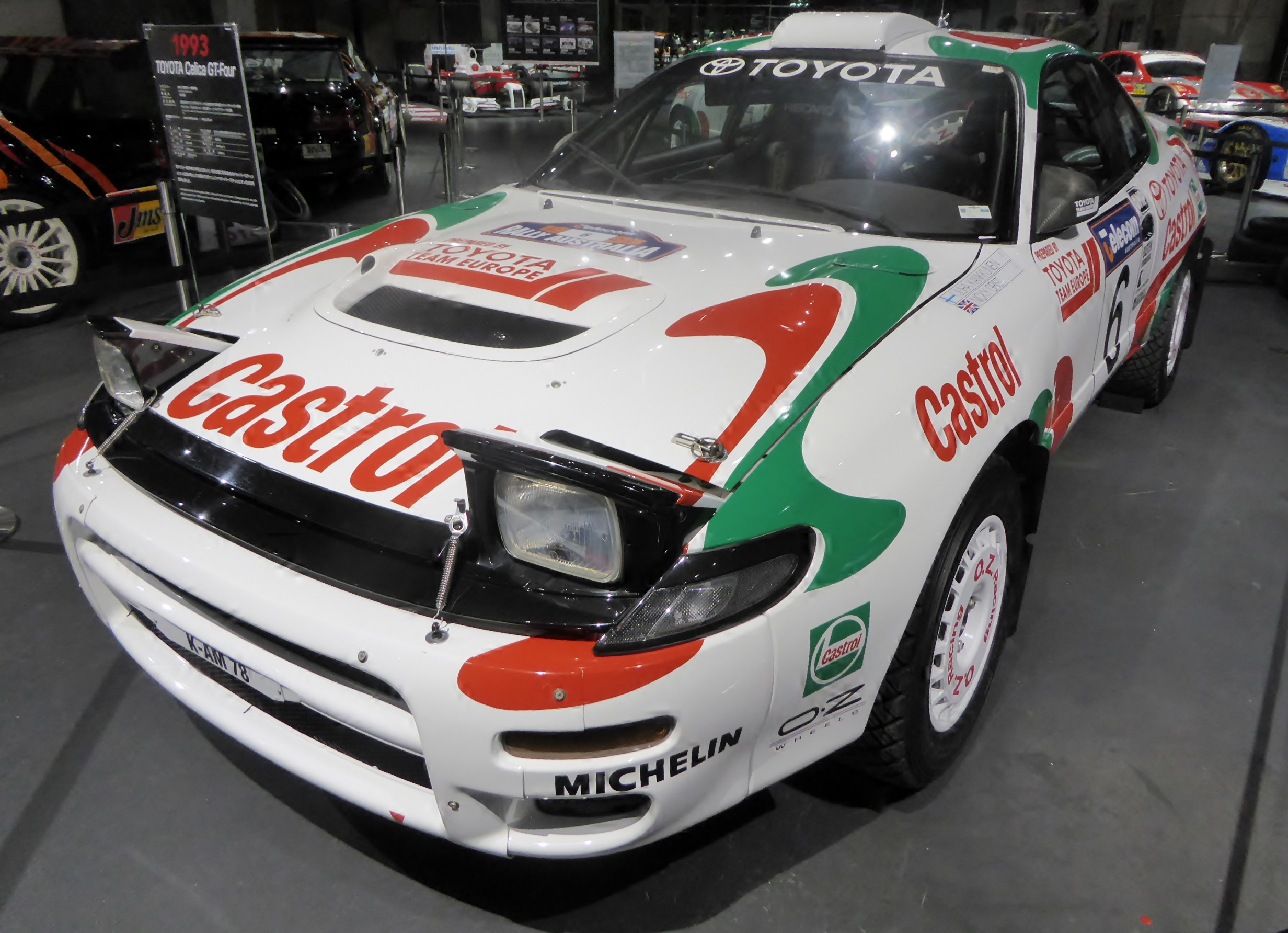
The 1993 World Rally Champions; Juha Kankkunen's Toyota Celica GT-Four ST185.

The 1993 World Rally Championship was the 21st season of the FIA World Rally Championship. The season consisted of 13 rallies. Juha Kankkunen won his fourth drivers' world championship in a Toyota Celica Turbo 4WD, ahead of François Delecour and Didier Auriol. The manufacturers' title was won by Toyota, ahead of Ford and Subaru.

Lancia dropped the Martini Racing works team, while the Lancia Delta continued through privateers Jolly Club and Astra Racing.

== Regulation changes ==
- For the first time, all rounds of the championship counted towards both drivers' and manufacturers' championships.
- Each manufacturer had to register a team and nominate the drivers 30 days before each event to score points for the manufacturers' championship.

== Calendar ==
| Rd. | Start date | Finish date | Rally | Rally headquarters | Surface | Stages | Distance |
|---|---|---|---|---|---|---|---|
| 1 | 23 January | 27 January | (Monaco) 61st Rallye Automobile Monte-Carlo | Monte Carlo | Mixed | 22 | 593.62 km |
| 2 | 12 February | 14 February | (Sweden) 42nd International Swedish Rally | Karlstad, Värmland County | Snow | 28 | 519.63 km |
| 3 | 3 March | 6 March | 27th Rallye de Portugal - Vinho do Porto | Estoril, Lisbon | Mixed | 38 | 576.13 km |
| 4 | 8 April | 12 April | (Kenya) 41st Trust Bank Safari Rally | Nairobi | Gravel | 28 | 2116.50 km |
| 5 | 2 May | 4 May | 37th Tour de Corse - Rallye de France | Ajaccio, Corsica | Tarmac | 24 | 556.42 km |
| 6 | 30 May | 1 June | (Greece) 40th Acropolis Rally | Athens | Gravel | 36 | 545.39 km |
| 7 | 14 July | 17 July | 13th Rally YPF Argentina | Carlos Paz, Córdoba | Gravel | 25 | 507.13 km |
| 8 | 5 August | 8 August | 24th Rothmans Rally New Zealand | Manukau, Auckland | Gravel | 36 | 562.74 km |
| 9 | 27 August | 29 August | (Finland) 43rd 1000 Lakes Rally | Jyväskylä, Central Finland | Gravel | 35 | 507.53 km |
| 10 | 18 September | 21 September | 6th Telecom Rally Australia | Perth, Western Australia | Gravel | 34 | 550.72 km |
| 11 | 11 October | 13 October | (Italy) 35th Rallye Sanremo - Rallye d'Italia | Sanremo, Liguria | Tarmac | 28 | 548.90 km |
| 12 | 2 November | 4 November | (Spain) 29th Rallye Catalunya - Costa Brava - Rallye de España | Lloret de Mar, Catalonia | Tarmac | 29 | 513.60 km |
| 13 | 21 November | 24 November | (United Kingdom) 49th Network Q RAC Rally | Birmingham, West Midlands | Gravel | 35 | 547.94 km |

== Teams and drivers ==
=== Manufacturer entries ===
| Team | Manufacturer | Car | Tyre | Driver | Co-Driver | Rounds |
|---|---|---|---|---|---|---|
| (Italy) Repsol Jolly Club | Lancia | Delta HF Integrale | M | (Spain) Carlos Sainz | (Spain) Luis Moya | 1, 3, 5–8, 10–11 |
| (Italy) Repsol Jolly Club | Lancia | Delta HF Integrale | P | (Spain) Carlos Sainz | (Spain) Luis Moya | 12 |
| (Italy) Repsol Jolly Club | Lancia | Delta HF Integrale | M | (Italy) Andrea Aghini | (Italy) Sauro Farnocchia | 1, 3 |
| (Italy) Repsol Jolly Club | Lancia | Delta HF Integrale | P | (Italy) Andrea Aghini | (Italy) Sauro Farnocchia | 5–6, 11 |
| (Italy) Repsol Jolly Club | Lancia | Delta HF Integrale | P | (Uruguay) Gustavo Trelles | (Argentina) Jorge Del Buono | 6–8, 12 |
| (Italy) Repsol Jolly Club | Lancia | Delta HF Integrale | P | (Italy) Dario Cerrato | (Italy) Luciano Guizzardi | 11 |
| (Italy) Astra Racing | Lancia | Delta HF Integrale | P | (Finland) Tommi Mäkinen | (Finland) Seppo Harjanne | 2, 6, 9 |
| (Italy) Astra Racing | Lancia | Delta HF Integrale | P | (Italy) Alessandro Fiorio | (Italy) Vittorio Brambilla | 3, 6, 11–12 |
| (Italy) Astra Racing | Lancia | Delta HF Integrale | P | (Argentina) Jorge Recalde | (Argentina) Martin Christie | 3 |
| (Japan) Toyota Castrol Team | Toyota | Celica Turbo 4WD (ST185) | M | (France) Didier Auriol | (France) Bernard Occelli | 1–2, 4–7, 9–10 |
| (Japan) Toyota Castrol Team | Toyota | Celica Turbo 4WD (ST185) | M | (Finland) Juha Kankkunen | (Finland) Juha Piironen | 1–2, 4, 6 |
| (Japan) Toyota Castrol Team | Toyota | Celica Turbo 4WD (ST185) | M | (Finland) Juha Kankkunen | (United Kingdom) Nicky Grist | 7–8, 10, 12–13 |
| (Japan) Toyota Castrol Team | Toyota | Celica Turbo 4WD (ST185) | M | (Finland) Juha Kankkunen | (France) Denis Giraudet | 9 |
| (Japan) Toyota Castrol Team | Toyota | Celica Turbo 4WD (ST185) | M | (Sweden) Mats Jonsson | (Sweden) Lars Bäckman | 2, 13 |
| (Japan) Toyota Castrol Team | Toyota | Celica GT-4 (ST165) | M | (Sweden) 'Gullabo' | (Sweden) Ingemar Algerstedt | 2 |
| (Japan) Toyota Castrol Team | Toyota | Celica Turbo 4WD (ST185) | M | (Finland) Markku Alén | (Finland) Ilkka Kivimäki | 4 |
| (Japan) Toyota Castrol Team | Toyota | Celica Turbo 4WD (ST185) | M | (Kenya) Ian Duncan | (Kenya) David Williamson | 4 |
| (Japan) Toyota Castrol Team | Toyota | Celica Turbo 4WD (ST185) | M | (Japan) Yasuhiro Iwase | (Kenya) Sudhir Vinayak | 4 |
| (Japan) Toyota Castrol Team | Toyota | Celica Turbo 4WD (ST185) | M | (France) François Chatriot | (France) Denis Giraudet | 5 |
| (Japan) Toyota Castrol Team | Toyota | Celica Turbo 4WD (ST185) | M | (France) Yves Loubet | (France) Didier Breton | 5 |
| (Japan) Toyota Castrol Team | Toyota | Celica Turbo 4WD (ST185) | M | (Finland) Hannu Mikkola | (Sweden) Arne Hertz | 9 |
| (United Kingdom) Ford Motor Co. Ltd. | Ford | Escort RS Cosworth | M | (Italy) Miki Biasion | (Italy) Tiziano Siviero | 1, 3, 5–8, 10–12 |
| (United Kingdom) Ford Motor Co. Ltd. | Ford | Escort RS Cosworth | M | (France) François Delecour | (France) Daniel Grataloup | 1, 3, 5–6, 8, 10–13 |
| (United Kingdom) Ford Motor Co. Ltd. | Ford | Escort RS Cosworth | M | (Sweden) Mikael Ericsson | (Sweden) Christina Thörner | 2 |
| (United Kingdom) Ford Motor Co. Ltd. | Ford | Escort RS Cosworth | M | (Finland) Sebastian Lindholm | (Finland) Timo Hantunen | 2 |
| (United Kingdom) Ford Motor Co. Ltd. | Ford | Escort RS Cosworth | M | (United Kingdom) Malcolm Wilson | (United Kingdom) Bryan Thomas | 2, 9 |
| (United Kingdom) Ford Motor Co. Ltd. | Ford | Escort RS Cosworth | M | (Portugal) Fernando Peres | (Portugal) Ricardo Caldeira | 3 |
| (United Kingdom) Ford Motor Co. Ltd. | Ford | Escort RS Cosworth | M | (Argentina) Carlos Menem jr. | (Argentina) Victor Zucchini | 7 |
| (Japan) 555 Subaru WRT | Subaru | Legacy RS | M | (United Kingdom) Colin McRae | (United Kingdom) Derek Ringer | 2–3, 5–6, 8, 10, 13 |
| (Japan) 555 Subaru WRT | Subaru | Vivio Sedan 4WD | B | (United Kingdom) Colin McRae | (United Kingdom) Derek Ringer | 4 |
| (Japan) 555 Subaru WRT | Subaru | Impreza 555 | M | (United Kingdom) Colin McRae | (United Kingdom) Derek Ringer | 13 |
| (Japan) 555 Subaru WRT | Subaru | Legacy RS | M | (Finland) Hannu Mikkola | (Sweden) Bruno Berglund | 2 |
| (Japan) 555 Subaru WRT | Subaru | Legacy RS | M | (Sweden) Per Eklund | (Sweden) Johnny Johansson | 2 |
| (Japan) 555 Subaru WRT | Subaru | Legacy RS | M | (Finland) Markku Alén | (Finland) Ilkka Kivimäki | 3 |
| (Japan) 555 Subaru WRT | Subaru | Impreza 555 | M | (Finland) Markku Alén | (Finland) Ilkka Kivimäki | 9 |
| (Japan) 555 Subaru WRT | Subaru | Vivio Sedan 4WD | B | (Kenya) Patrick Njiru | (Kenya) Rick Mathews | 4 |
| (Japan) 555 Subaru WRT | Subaru | Vivio Sedan 4WD | B | (Japan) Masashi Ishida | (Kenya) Mohammed Verjee | 4 |
| (Japan) 555 Subaru WRT | Subaru | Legacy RS | M | (Finland) Ari Vatanen | (Sweden) Bruno Berglund | 6, 8, 10 |
| (Japan) 555 Subaru WRT | Subaru | Impreza 555 | M | (Finland) Ari Vatanen | (Sweden) Bruno Berglund | 9, 13 |
| (Japan) 555 Subaru WRT | Subaru | Legacy RS | M | (New Zealand) Peter 'Possum' Bourne | (New Zealand) Rodger Freeth | 8, 10 |
| (Japan) 555 Subaru WRT | Subaru | Legacy RS | P | (Italy) Piero Liatti | (Italy) Alessandro Alessandrini | 11 |
| (Japan) 555 Subaru WRT | Subaru | Legacy RS | P | (United Kingdom) Richard Burns | (United Kingdom) Robert Reid | 13 |
| (Japan) 555 Subaru WRT | Subaru | Legacy RS | P | (United Kingdom) Alister McRae | (United Kingdom) David Senior | 13 |
| (Japan) Mitsubishi Ralliart | Mitsubishi | Lancer Evo I | M | (Germany) Armin Schwarz | (United Kingdom) Nicky Grist | 1, 3, 6, 9 |
| (Japan) Mitsubishi Ralliart | Mitsubishi | Lancer Evo I | M | (Germany) Armin Schwarz | (Germany) Peter Thul | 13 |
| (Japan) Mitsubishi Ralliart | Mitsubishi | Lancer Evo I | M | (Sweden) Kenneth Eriksson | (Sweden) Staffan Parmander | 1, 3, 6, 9, 13 |
| (Japan) Mitsubishi Ralliart | Mitsubishi | Galant VR-4 (Grp. N) | M | (Finland) Jarmo Kytölehto | (Finland) Arto Kapanen | 2, 9 |
| (Japan) Mitsubishi Ralliart | Mitsubishi | Galant VR-4 (Grp. N) | M | (Sweden) Stig-Olov Walfridsson | (Sweden) Gunnar Barth | 2 |
| (Japan) Mitsubishi Ralliart | Mitsubishi | Galant VR-4 (Grp. N) | M | (Sweden) Kenneth Bäcklund | (Sweden) Tord Andersson | 2 |
| (Japan) Mitsubishi Ralliart | Mitsubishi | Lancer Evo I | Y | (Japan) Kenjiro Shinozuka | (Finland) Pentti Kuukkala | 4 |
| (Japan) Mitsubishi Ralliart | Mitsubishi | Lancer Evo I | ? | (Australia) Ross Dunkerton | (Lithuania) Fred Gocentas | 8, 10 |

=== Non Manufacturer Entries ===
Major entries not registered as manufacturers
| Team | Manufacturer | Car | Tyre | Drivers | Co-drivers | Rounds |
|---|---|---|---|---|---|---|
| (Czech Republic) Škoda Motorsport | Škoda | Favorit 136 L | M | (Czech Republic) Pavel Sibera | (Czech Republic) Petr Gross | 1–3, 5, 9, 11–13 |
| (Czech Republic) Škoda Motorsport | Škoda | Favorit 136 L | M | (Czech Republic) Emil Triner | (Czech Republic) Jiří Klíma | 1–3, 5, 9, 11–13 |
| (Czech Republic) Škoda Motorsport | Škoda | Favorit 136 L | M | (Czech Republic) Vladimír Berger | (Czech Republic) Martin Hruška | 13 |
| (Czech Republic) Škoda Motorsport | Škoda | Favorit 136 L | M | (United Kingdom) Mick Smith | (United Kingdom) Nick Middleton | 13 |
| Opel Team Belgium | Opel | Astra GSi 16V | M | (Belgium) Bruno Thiry | (Belgium) Stéphane Prévot | 1–3, 9, 11–12 |
| Opel Team Sweden | Opel | Astra GSi 16V | ? | (Sweden) Per Svan | (Sweden) Johan Olsson | 2 |
| (Spain) Opel Team España | Opel | Astra GSi 16V | M | (Spain) Josep María Bardolet | (Spain) Joaquim Muntada | 12 |
| (Spain) Opel Team España | Opel | Astra GSi 16V | M | (Spain) Luis Climent | (Spain) José Antonio Muñoz | 12 |
| Opel Team Sweden | Opel | Calibra Turbo 4x4 | P | (Sweden) Stig Blomqvist | (Sweden) Benny Melander | 2 |
| (Netherlands) Opel Dealer Team Holland | Opel | Calibra Turbo 4x4 | M | (Netherlands) Erwin Doctor | (Netherlands) Theo Badenberg | 12 |
| (Switzerland) Scuderia Chicco d'Oro | Ford | Sierra RS Cosworth 4x4 | P | (Switzerland) Olivier Burri | (Switzerland) Christophe Hofmann | 1 |
| (Portugal) Rodamsport | Ford | Sierra RS Cosworth 4x4 | M | (Portugal) José Miguel | (Portugal) António Manuel | 3 |
| (Denmark) Helle Motorsport | Ford | Escort RS Cosworth | ? | (Denmark) Holger Helle | (Denmark) Karsten Richardt | 1 |
| (France) Yacco | Ford | Escort RS Cosworth | M | (France) Bernard Béguin | (France) Jean-Paul Chiaroni | 5 |
| (New Zealand) Brian Stokes | Ford | Escort RS Cosworth | M | (New Zealand) Brian Stokes | (New Zealand) Jeff Judd | 8 |
| Ford Team Finland | Ford | Escort RS Cosworth | M | (Finland) Sebastian Lindholm | (Finland) Timo Hantunen | 9, 13 |
| (Italy) Ford Italia | Ford | Escort RS Cosworth | P | (Italy) Gianfranco Cunico | (Italy) Stefano Evangelisti | 11 |
| (Belgium) Bastos Ford Credit | Ford | Escort RS Cosworth | P | (Belgium) Patrick Snijers | (Belgium) Dany Colebunders | 11 |
| (United Kingdom) Michelin Pilot Team Ford | Ford | Escort RS Cosworth | M | (United Kingdom) Malcolm Wilson | (United Kingdom) Bryan Thomas | 13 |
| (United Kingdom) Michelin Pilot Team Ford | Ford | Escort RS Cosworth | M | (United Kingdom) Robbie Head | (United Kingdom) Campbell Roy | 13 |
| (France) Automobiles Citroën | Citroën | ZX 16V | M | (France) Patrick Magaud | (France) Guylène Brun | 1 |
| (France) Automobiles Citroën | Citroën | AX GTI | M | (France) Christine Driano | (France) Marie-Christine Lallement | 1, 3, 5–8, 11 |
| (Sweden) Skepptuna MK | Citroën | BX GTI 16S | ? | (Sweden) Magnus Gustavsson | (Sweden) Kenneth Göransson | 2 |
| (Portugal) Axergie | Citroën | AX GTI | M | (Portugal) Adruzilo Lopes | (Portugal) Luís Lisboa | 3 |
| (France) Peugeot Sport | Peugeot | 309 GTI 16 | M | (France) Jean-Pierre Ballet | (France) Jean-Pierre Dupont | 1 |
| (France) Peugeot Sport | Peugeot | 106 XSi | M | (France) Gilles Panizzi | (France) Hervé Panizzi | 5 |
| (France) Peugeot Sport | Peugeot | 106 XSi | M | (France) Christian Bruzi | (France) Jean-Jacques Pages | 5 |
| (Italy) Peugeot Team Italia | Peugeot | 106 XSi | M | (Italy) Angelo Medeghini | (Italy) Paolo Cecchini | 11 |
| (Italy) Peugeot Team Italia | Peugeot | 106 XSi | M | (Italy) Paolo Andreucci | (Italy) Paolo Amati | 11 |
| (France) Peugeot Talbot Sport | Peugeot | 106 XSi | M | (Spain) Oriol Gómez | (Spain) Marc Martí | 12 |
| (France) Peugeot Talbot Sport | Peugeot | 309 GTI 16 | D | (United Kingdom) Mark Lawn | (United Kingdom) Steve Harris | 13 |
| (Austria) SMS AG Revo Ingenieure | Audi | Coupé S2 | P | (Austria) Sepp Haider | (Austria) Klaus Wendel | 2, 8, 10 |
| (Austria) Stohl Racing | Audi | Coupé S2 | M | (Austria) Rudolf Stohl | (Austria) Peter Diekmann | 4, 6–7 |
| (Austria) Stohl Racing | Audi | 90 Quattro | M | (Austria) Manfred Stohl | (Germany) Kay Gerlach | 4, 7 |
| (Sweden) Q8 Team Mazda Dealer | Mazda | 323 GT-R | M | (Sweden) 'Nalle' | (Sweden) Anders Olsson | 2 |
| (Sweden) Wessman Rally Sport | Mazda | 323 GT-R | ? | (Sweden) Håkan Eriksson | (Sweden) Jan Svanström | 2 |
| (New Zealand) Allport Motorsport | Mazda | 323 GT-R | ? | (New Zealand) Neil Allport | (New Zealand) Jim Robb | 8 |
| (Norway) KNA Oslo | Toyota | Toyota Celica GT-4 (ST165) | B | (Norway) Birger Gundersen | (Norway) Petter Vegel | 2 |
| (Kenya) Top Wheels | Toyota | Toyota Celica GT-4 (ST165) | ? | (Kenya) Jonathan Toroitich | (Kenya) Ibrahim Choge | 4 |
| (Zimbabwe) Billy Rautenbach | Toyota | Toyota Celica GT-4 (ST165) | ? | (Zimbabwe) Billy Rautenbach | (Kenya) Surinder Thatthi | 4 |
| (Finland) Marcus Grönholm | Toyota | Celica Turbo 4WD (ST185) | M | (Finland) Marcus Grönholm | (Finland) Voitto Silander | 9 |
| (Sweden) Vännäs MK | Toyota | Celica Turbo 4WD (ST185) | M | (Sweden) Thomas Rådström | (Sweden) Anders Dawidson | 9 |
| Toyota Team Australia | Toyota | Celica Turbo 4WD (ST185) | ? | (Australia) Neal Bates | (Australia) Coral Taylor | 10 |
| (Portugal) Duriforte Construções | Lancia | Delta HF Integrale | P | (Portugal) Jorge Bica | (Portugal) João Sena | 3 |
| (Greece) Konstantinos Apostolou | Lancia | Delta HF Integrale | M | (Greece) Konstantinos Apostolou | (Greece) Mihalis Kriadis | 6 |
| (Greece) Nikos Tsadaris | Lancia | Delta HF Integrale | ? | (Greece) Nikos Tsadaris | (Greece) Elias Kafaoglou | 6 |
| (Italy) H.F. Grifone SRL | Lancia | Delta HF Integrale | M | (Italy) Piero Longhi | (Italy) Flavio Zanella | 11 |
| (Italy) H.F. Grifone SRL | Lancia | Delta HF Integrale | M | (Italy) Gilberto Pianezzola | (Italy) Loris Roggia | 11, 13 |
| (Czech Republic) Večerník Praha | Lancia | Delta HF Integrale | P | (Czech Republic) Ladislav Křeček | (Czech Republic) Jan Krečman | 11 |
| (Portugal) Renault Galp | Renault | Clio 1.8 16V | M | (Portugal) José Carlos Macedo | (Portugal) Miguel Borges | 3 |
| (France) Société Diac | Renault | Clio Williams | M | (France) Alain Oreille | (France) Jean-Marc Andrié | 5 |
| (France) Société Diac | Renault | Clio Williams | M | (France) Jean Ragnotti | (France) Gilles Thimonier | 5 |
| (France) Société Diac | Renault | Clio Williams | M | (France) Serge Jordan | (France) Jack Boyère | 5 |
| (France) Société Diac | Renault | Clio Williams | M | (France) Claude Balesi | (France) Jean-Paul Cirindini | 5 |
| (Greece) "Leonidas" | Renault | Clio Williams | M | (Greece) "Leonidas" | (Greece) Maria Pavli-Korre | 6 |
| (Argentina) Gabriel Raies | Renault | 18 GTX | ? | (Argentina) Gabriel Raies | (Argentina) Jose Maria Volta | 7 |
| (Argentina) Juan Pablo Raies | Renault | 18 GTX | ? | (Argentina) Juan Pablo Raies | (Argentina) Rodolfo Amelio Ortiz | 7 |
| (Kenya) Ryce Motors Ltd. | Daihatsu | Charade | D | (Kenya) Marco Brighetti | (Kenya) Abdul Sidi | 4 |
| (Kenya) Ryce Motors Ltd. | Daihatsu | Charade | D | (Kenya) Guy Jack | (United Kingdom) Des Page-Morris | 4 |
| (Kenya) Ryce Motors Ltd. | Daihatsu | Charade | D | (Kenya) Ashok Pattni | (Kenya) Zahid Mogul | 4 |
| (Kenya) Azar Anwar | Subaru | Legacy RS | ? | (Kenya) Azar Anwar | (Kenya) Shailen Shah | 4 |
| (France) Frédéric Dor | Subaru | Legacy RS | P | (France) Frédéric Dor | (France) Philippe Viale | 5 |
| (New Zealand) Joe McAndrew | Subaru | Legacy RS | P | (New Zealand) Joe McAndrew | (New Zealand) Bob Haldane | 8 |
| (United Kingdom) Kaliber | Subaru | Legacy RS | D | (United Kingdom) Kenny McKinstry | (United Kingdom) Robbie Philpott | 12 |
| (Kenya) Chemigas Limited | Volkswagen | Golf II GTi 16V | ? | (Kenya) Sammy Aslam | (Kenya) Farakh Yusuf | 4 |
| (United Kingdom) Shell Helix Motor Oils | Volkswagen | Golf II GTi 16V | D | (United Kingdom) Jimmy McRae | (United Kingdom) Chris Wood | 13 |
| (Belgium) Autostal Duindistel | Nissan | Sunny GTI-R | ? | (Belgium) Gaby Goudezeune | (Belgium) Filip De Pelsemaeker | 6 |
| Nissan Belgium Rally Team | Nissan | Sunny GTi | P | (Belgium) Grégoire de Mevius | (Belgium) Willy Lux | 13 |
| (Russia) Autovaz Rally | Lada | Samara 21083 | ? | (Russia) Sergey Alyasov | (Russia) Aleksandr Levitan | 6, 9, 13 |
| (Russia) Autovaz Rally | Lada | Samara 21083 | ? | (Russia) Vladislav Shtykov | (Russia) Yuriy Baykov | 6 |
| (Russia) Autovaz Rally | Lada | Samara 21083 | ? | (Russia) Aleksandr Nikonenko | (Russia) Sergey Talantsev | 6, 9 |
| (Russia) Autovaz Rally | Lada | Samara 21083 | ? | (Russia) Aleksandr Artemenko | (Russia) Viktor Timkovskiy | 8–9, 13 |
| (Argentina) José Ceccheto | Fiat | Regatta | ? | (Argentina) José Ceccheto | (Argentina) Justo Carrera | 7 |
| (Argentina) Carlos Malarczuk | Fiat | Regatta | ? | (Argentina) Carlos Malarczuk | (Argentina) Jorge Gonzalez | 7 |
| Mitsubishi Ralliart Finland | Mitsubishi | Galant VR-4 | Y | (Finland) Lasse Lampi | (Finland) Pentti Kuukkala | 9 |
| (Finland) Blue Rose Team | Mitsubishi | Galant VR-4 | ? | (Finland) Mika Sohlberg | (Finland) Risto Mannisenmäki | 9 |
| Indonesia Rally Team | Mitsubishi | Galant VR-4 | ? | (Indonesia) Tony Hardianto | (Indonesia) Teddy Kurnadi | 10 |
| Indonesia Rally Team | Mitsubishi | Galant VR-4 | ? | (Indonesia) Ledi Kurnadi | (Indonesia) Raphael Arioseno | 10 |
| (United States) MIT Motorsport | Honda | Civic SiR | ? | (United States) John Buffum | (United Kingdom) Steve Greenhill | 10 |
| (Japan) Suzuki Sport | Suzuki | Swift GTi MK2 | ? | (Japan) Nobuhiro Tajima | (Australia) Ross Runnalls | 10 |
| Team Suzuki Malaysia | Suzuki | Swift GTi MK2 | ? | (Australia) Russell Palmer | (Australia) Brian Harwood | 10 |
| (United Kingdom) Vauxhall Motorsport | Vauxhall | Astra GSI 16V | M | (United Kingdom) David Llewellin | (United Kingdom) Ian Grindrod | 13 |
| (United Kingdom) Vauxhall Motorsport | Vauxhall | Astra GSI 16V | M | (United Kingdom) Mark Higgins | (United Kingdom) Mike Corner | 13 |

=== FIA Group N Cup major entries ===
| Team | Manufacturer | Car | Tyre | Drivers | Co-drivers | Rounds |
|---|---|---|---|---|---|---|
| (Monaco) Christophe Spiliotis | Lancia | Delta HF Integrale | M | (Monaco) Christophe Spiliotis | (France) Hervé Thibaud | 1 |
| (Portugal) Ramiro Fernandes | Lancia | Delta Integrale 16V | ? | (Portugal) Ramiro Fernandes | (Portugal) Monteiro Cruz | 3 |
| (France) Jean-Baptiste Serpaggi | Ford | Escort RS Cosworth | ? | (France) Jean-Baptiste Serpaggi | (France) Francis Serpaggi | 1, 5 |
| (Italy) Mirabella Racing | Ford | Escort RS Cosworth | ? | (Italy) Andrea Dallavilla | (Italy) Danilo Fappani | 1, 11 |
| (United Kingdom) Marlboro Team Ford | Ford | Escort RS Cosworth | M | (United Arab Emirates) Mohammed Ben Sulayem | (Republic of Ireland) Ronan Morgan | 1–2, 6–7, 11–12 |
| (Portugal) António Coutinho | Ford | Escort RS Cosworth | P | (Portugal) António Coutinho | (Portugal) Cândido Júnior | 3 |
| (Portugal) António Coutinho | Ford | Escort RS Cosworth | P | (Portugal) António Coutinho | (Portugal) António Manuel | 5 |
| (Portugal) António Coutinho | Ford | Escort RS Cosworth | P | (Portugal) António Coutinho | (Portugal) Paulo Brandão | 7 |
| (Portugal) António Coutinho | Ford | Escort RS Cosworth | P | (Portugal) António Coutinho | (Portugal) Luís Lisboa | 11–12 |
| (Italy) Ford Italia | Ford | Escort RS Cosworth | ? | (Italy) Giovanni Manfrinato | (Italy) Claudio Condotta | 5, 11 |
| (Italy) Renato Travaglia | Ford | Escort RS Cosworth | ? | (Italy) Renato Travaglia | (Italy) Alessandro Mari | 11 |
| (Italy) Sanremo Promo Sport | Ford | Escort RS Cosworth | ? | (Monaco) Christophe Spiliotis | (France) Hervé Thibaud | 11 |
| (United Kingdom) Shell Helix Motor Oils | Ford | Escort RS Cosworth | D | (United Kingdom) Gwyndaf Evans | (United Kingdom) Howard Davies | 13 |
| (United Kingdom) Shell Helix Motor Oils | Ford | Escort RS Cosworth | D | (United Kingdom) Jonny Milner | (United Kingdom) Steve Turvey | 13 |
| (Germany) Mitsubishi Motors Deutschland | Mitsubishi | Galant VR-4 | P | (Germany) Isolde Holderied | (Sweden) Christina Thörner | 1 |
| (Japan) Mitsubishi Ralliart | Mitsubishi | Galant VR-4 | M | (Sweden) Kenneth Bäcklund | (Sweden) Tord Andersson | 2 |
| (Japan) Mitsubishi Ralliart | Mitsubishi | Galant VR-4 | M | (Finland) Jarmo Kytölehto | (Finland) Arto Kapanen | 2, 9 |
| (Japan) Mitsubishi Ralliart | Mitsubishi | Galant VR-4 | M | (Sweden) Stig-Olov Walfridsson | (Sweden) Gunnar Barth | 2 |
| Mitsubishi Ralliart Finland | Mitsubishi | Galant VR-4 | M | (Finland) Jouko Puhakka | (Finland) Keijo Eerola | 9 |
| (Japan) Yoshio Fujimoto | Mitsubishi | Lancer Evo I | Y | (Japan) Yoshio Fujimoto | (Japan) Hakaru Ichino | 8, 10 |
| (Hong Kong) Michael Lieu | Mitsubishi | Lancer Evo I | ? | (Hong Kong) Michael Lieu | (Malaysia) Edmond Lim | 8, 10 |
| (Australia) Les Walkden Racing | Mitsubishi | Lancer Evo I | B | (Australia) Ed Ordynski | (Australia) Mark Stacey | 10 |
| (Japan) Kiyoshi Inoue | Mitsubishi | Lancer Evo I | ? | (Japan) Kiyoshi Inoue | (Japan) Satoshi Hayashi | 10 |
| (Australia) Melbourne University Car Club | Mitsubishi | Lancer Evo I | ? | (Australia) David Officer | (Australia) Kate Officer | 10 |
| (Italy) Rally Team Italia | Mazda | 323 GT-R | M | (Italy) Alessandro Fassina | (Italy) Luigi Pirollo | 3, 6, 8, 11–12 |
| (Greece) Notis Giagnissis | Mazda | 323 GT-R | M | (Greece) Notis Giagnissis | (Greece) Giorgos Kerantzakis | 6 |
| (Greece) Pavlos Moschoutis | Mazda | 323 GT-R | B | (Greece) Pavlos Moschoutis | (Greece) Kóstas Fertakis | 6 |
| (Austria) Stefan Reininger | Subaru | Legacy RS | D | (Austria) Stefan Reininger | (Austria) Rudolf Brandstätter | 3–4 |
| (Austria) Stefan Reininger | Subaru | Legacy RS | D | (Austria) Stefan Reininger | (United Kingdom) Simon Young | 6–7 |
| (Kenya) Hasmat Shamji | Subaru | Legacy RS | ? | (Kenya) Hasmat Shamji | (Kenya) Peter Stone | 4 |
| (United Kingdom) Mike Rimmer | Subaru | Legacy RS | ? | (United Kingdom) Mike Rimmer | (United Kingdom) Chris Patterson | 13 |
| (Japan) Morio Nitta | Toyota | Celica GT-4 (ST165) | ? | (Japan) Morio Nitta | (Kenya) Dave Macharia | 4 |
| (France) Société Diac | Renault | Clio Williams | M | (France) Serge Jordan | (France) Jack Boyère | 5 |
| (Spain) Escudería Purroy | Renault | Clio 16V | ? | (Spain) Javier Azcona | (Italy) Inma Vittorini | 12 |
| (France) Guy Fiori | BMW | 325i E30 | M | (France) Guy Fiori | (France) Mario Bastelica | 5 |
| (Bolivia) Sergio Kosky | Nissan | Pulsar GTi-R | ? | (Bolivia) Sergio Kosky | (Bolivia) Jorge Vargas | 7 |
| (Spain) Peña Motorista 10xHora | Peugeot | 309 GTI | M | (Spain) Jordi Serracanta | (Spain) Pau Serracanta | 12 |

== Results and standings ==
=== Drivers' championship ===
| Pos. | Driver | MON (Monaco) | SWE (Sweden) | POR (Portugal) | KEN (Kenya) | FRA (France) | GRE (Greece) | ARG (Argentina) | NZL (New Zealand) | FIN (Finland) | AUS (Australia) | ITA (Italy) | ESP (Spain) | GBR (United Kingdom) | Pts |
|---|---|---|---|---|---|---|---|---|---|---|---|---|---|---|---|
| 1 | (Finland) Juha Kankkunen | (5) | 2 | | 1 | | Ret | 1 | 5 | 1 | 1 | | 3 | 1 | 135 |
| 2 | (France) François Delecour | 2 | | 1 | | 1 | Ret | | 2 | | 3 | Ret | 1 | 4 | 112 |
| 3 | (France) Didier Auriol | 1 | Ret | | | 2 | Ret | 3 | 3 | 3 | Ret | | 2 | 6 | 92 |
| 4 | (Italy) Miki Biasion | 3 | | 2 | | 7 | 1 | 2 | Ret | | Ret | Ret | 4 | | 76 |
| 5 | (United Kingdom) Colin McRae | | 3 | 7 | Ret | 4 | Ret | | 1 | | 6 | | | Ret | 50 |
| 6 | (Sweden) Kenneth Eriksson | 4 | | 5 | | | Ret | | | 5 | | | | 2 | 41 |
| 7 | (Finland) Ari Vatanen | | | | | | Ret | | Ret | 2 | 2 | | | 5 | 38 |
| 8 | (Spain) Carlos Sainz | 14 | | Ret | | 4 | 2 | Ret | 4 | | Ret | Ret | Ret | | 35 |
| 9 | (Uruguay) Gustavo Trelles | | | | | | 5 | 4 | 7 | | | | 6 | | 28 |
| 10 | (Finland) Tommi Mäkinen | | 4 | | | | 6 | | | 4 | | | | | 26 |
| 11 | (Finland) Markku Alén | | | 4 | 2 | | | | | Ret | | | | | 25 |
| 12 | (Germany) Armin Schwarz | 6 | | Ret | | | 3 | | | 9 | | | | 8 | 23 |
| 13 | (Sweden) Mats Jonsson | | 1 | | | | | | | | | | | 9 | 22 |
| 14 | (Italy) Andrea Aghini | Ret | | 3 | | Ret | 4 | | | | | Ret | | | 22 |
| 15 | (Italy) Gianfranco Cunico | | | | | | | | | | | 1 | | | 20 |
| 16 | (Italy) Alex Fiorio | | | 6 | | | 7 | | | | | Ret | 5 | | 18 |
| 17 | (Belgium) Bruno Thiry | 8 | | 10 | | Ret | Ret | | | 18 | | 5 | 7 | | 16 |
| 18 | (Belgium) Patrick Snijers | | | | | | | | | | | 2 | | | 15 |
| 19= | (Kenya) Ian Duncan | | | | 3 | | | | | | | | | | 12 |
| 19= | (France) François Chatriot | | | | | 3 | | | | | | | | | 12 |
| 19= | (Italy) Gilberto Pianezzola | | | | | | | | | | | 3 | | Ret | 12 |
| 19= | (United Kingdom) Malcolm Wilson | | Ret | | | | | | | Ret | | | | 3 | 12 |
| 23 | (Austria) Sepp Haider | | 7 | | | | | | Ret | | 5 | | | | 12 |
| 24= | (Japan) Yasuhiro Iwase | | | | 4 | | | | | | | | | | 10 |
| 24= | (Australia) Ross Dunkerton | | | | | | | | Ret | | 4 | | | | 10 |
| 24= | (Italy) Piero Liatti | | | | | | | | | | | 4 | | | 10 |
| 27= | (Sweden) Björn 'Nalle' Johansson | | 5 | | | | | | | | | | | | 8 |
| 27= | (Kenya) Guy Jack | | | | 5 | | | | | | | | | | 8 |
| 27= | (Argentina) Carlos Menem, Jr. | | | Ret | | | | 5 | | | | | | | 8 |
| 30 | (Austria) Rudolf Stohl | | | | 8 | | Ret | 7 | | | | | | | 7 |
| 31= | (Sweden) Per Eklund | | 6 | | | | | | | | | | | | 6 |
| 31= | (Kenya) Ashok Pattni | | | | 6 | | | | | | | | | | 6 |
| 31= | (France) Bernard Béguin | | | | | 6 | | | | | | | | | 6 |
| 31= | (United Arab Emirates) Mohammed Ben Sulayem | | Ret | Ret | | | Ret | 6 | | | | 17 | Ret | | 6 |
| 31= | (New Zealand) Peter 'Possum' Bourne | | | | | | | | 6 | | Ret | | | | 6 |
| 31= | (Finland) Sebastian Lindholm | | | | | | | | | 6 | | | | Ret | 6 |
| 31= | (Italy) Renato Travaglia | | | | | | | | | | | 6 | | | 6 |
| 38= | (Switzerland) Olivier Burri | 7 | | | | | | | | | | | | | 4 |
| 38= | (Kenya) Marco Brighetti | | | | 7 | | | | | | | | | | 4 |
| 38= | (Finland) Hannu Mikkola | | Ret | | | | | | | 7 | | | | | 4 |
| 38= | (Australia) Ed Ordynski | | | | | | | | | | 7 | | | | 4 |
| 38= | (Italy) Andrea Dallavilla | Ret | | | | | | | | | | 7 | | | 4 |
| 38= | (United Kingdom) Richard Burns | | | | | | | | | | | | | 7 | 4 |
| 44 | (Italy) Alex Fassina | | | 9 | | | 10 | | 11 | | | 10 | 14 | | 4 |
| 45= | (Sweden) Kenneth Bäcklund | | 8 | | | | | | | | | | | | 3 |
| 45= | (Portugal) Jorge Bica | | | 8 | | | | | | | | | | | 3 |
| 45= | (France) Jean Ragnotti | | | | | 8 | | | | | | | | | 3 |
| 45= | (Greece) Konstantinos Apostolou | | | | | | 8 | | | | | | | | 3 |
| 45= | (Portugal) António Coutinho | | | 12 | | 15 | | 8 | | | | 15 | Ret | | 3 |
| 45= | (New Zealand) Neil Allport | | | | | | | | 8 | | | | | | 3 |
| 45= | (Finland) Lasse Lampi | | | | | | | | | 8 | | | | | 3 |
| 45= | (Australia) Neal Bates | | | | | | | | | | 8 | | | | 3 |
| 45= | (Italy) Angelo Medeghini | | | | | | | | | | | 8 | | | 3 |
| 45= | (Spain) Luís Climent | | | | | | | | | | | | 8 | | 3 |
| 55= | (Monaco) Christophe Spiliotis | 9 | | | | | | | | | | Ret | | | 2 |
| 55= | (Finland) Jarmo Kytölehto | | 9 | | | | | | | 11 | | | | | 2 |
| 55= | (Kenya) Hasmat Shamji | | | | 9 | | | | | | | | | | 2 |
| 55= | (France) Alain Oreille | | | | | 9 | | | | | | | | | 2 |
| 55= | (Greece) Níkos Tsadaris | | | | | | 9 | | | | | | | | 2 |
| 55= | (Argentina) Gabriel Raies | | | | | | | 9 | | | | | | | 2 |
| 55= | (New Zealand) Joe McAndrew | | | | | | | | 9 | | | | | | 2 |
| 55= | (Japan) Kiyoshi Inoue | | | | | | | | | | 9 | | | | 2 |
| 55= | (Belgium) Freddy Loix | | | | | | | | | | | 9 | | | 2 |
| 55= | (Spain) Josep María Bardolet | | | | | | | | | | | | 9 | | 2 |
| 65= | (France) Jean-Baptiste Serpaggi | 10 | | | | Ret | | | | | | | | | 1 |
| 65= | (Sweden) Per Svan | | 10 | | | | | | | | | | | | 1 |
| 65= | (Austria) Manfred Stohl | | | | 10 | | | 12 | | | | | | | 1 |
| 65= | (Italy) Giovanni Manfrinato | | | | | 10 | | | | | | Ret | | | 1 |
| 65= | (Argentina) José Ceccheto | | | | | | | 10 | | | | | | | 1 |
| 65= | (Japan) Yoshio Fujimoto | | | | | | | | 10 | | Ret | | | | 1 |
| 65= | (Finland) Marcus Grönholm | | | | | | | | | 10 | | | | | 1 |
| 65= | (Australia) David Officer | | | | | | | | | | 10 | | | | 1 |
| 65= | (Spain) Oriol Gómez | | | | | | | | | | | | 10 | | 1 |
| 65= | (United Kingdom) Alister McRae | | Ret | | | | | | | | | | | 10 | 1 |
| Pos. | Driver | MON (Monaco) | SWE (Sweden) | POR (Portugal) | KEN (Kenya) | FRA (France) | GRE (Greece) | ARG (Argentina) | NZL (New Zealand) | FIN (Finland) | AUS (Australia) | ITA (Italy) | ESP (Spain) | GBR (United Kingdom) | Pts |

Key
| Colour | Result |
|---|---|
| Gold | Winner |
| Silver | 2nd place |
| Bronze | 3rd place |
| Green | Points finish |
| Blue | Non-points finish |
| Blue | Non-classified finish (NC) |
| Purple | Did not finish (Ret) |
| Black | Excluded (EX) |
| Black | Disqualified (DSQ) |
| White | Did not start (DNS) |
| White | Cancelled (C) |
| Blank | Withdrew entry from the event (WD) |

=== Manufacturers' championship ===
| Pos. | Manufacturer | MON (Monaco) | SWE (Sweden) | POR (Portugal) | KEN (Kenya) | FRA (France) | GRE (Greece) | ARG (Argentina) | NZL (New Zealand) | FIN (Finland) | AUS (Australia) | ITA (Italy) | ESP (Spain) | GBR (United Kingdom) | Points |
|---|---|---|---|---|---|---|---|---|---|---|---|---|---|---|---|
| 1 | (Japan) Toyota | 1 | 1 | | 1 | 2 | | 1 | (3) | 1 | 1 | | | 1 | 157 |
| 2 | (United Kingdom) Ford | 2 | | 1 | | 1 | 1 | 2 | 2 | | (3) | | 1 | 3 | 145 |
| 3 | (Japan) Subaru | | 3 | 4 | | 5 | | | 1 | 2 | 2 | 5 | | 5 | 112 |
| 4 | (Japan) Mitsubishi | 4 | 8 | 5 | | | 3 | | | 5 | 4 | | | 2 | 86 |
| 5 | (Italy) Lancia | | | 3 | | 4 | 2 | 4 | 4 | | | | 6 | | 75 |
| Pos. | Manufacturer | MON (Monaco) | SWE (Sweden) | POR (Portugal) | KEN (Kenya) | FRA (France) | GRE (Greece) | ARG (Argentina) | NZL (New Zealand) | FIN (Finland) | AUS (Australia) | ITA (Italy) | ESP (Spain) | GBR (United Kingdom) | Points |

== Events ==
1993 World Rally Championship event map
| Black = Tarmac | Brown = Gravel | Blue = Ice/Snow | Red = Mixed Surface |

1993 World Rally Championship schedule and results
| Rally Name | Dates run | Podium Drivers (Finishing Time) | Podium Cars |
|---|---|---|---|
| (Monaco) Rallye Monte Carlo | 21 January–27 January | 1. (France) Didier Auriol (6h:13m:43s); 2. (France) François Delecour (6h:13m:58s); 3. (Italy) Miki Biasion (6h:16m:59s) | 1. Toyota Celica Turbo 4WD; 2. Ford Escort RS Cosworth; 3. Ford Escort RS Cosworth |
| (Sweden) Swedish Rally | 12 February–14 February | 1. (Sweden) Mats Jonsson (4h:49m:05s); 2. (Finland) Juha Kankkunen (4h:49m:18s); 3. (United Kingdom) Colin McRae (4h:49m:33s) | 1. Toyota Celica Turbo 4WD; 2. Toyota Celica Turbo 4WD; 3. Subaru Legacy RS |
| Rallye de Portugal | 3 March–6 March | 1. (France) François Delecour (6h:20m:37s); 2. (Italy) Miki Biasion (6h:21m:32s); 3. (Italy) Andrea Aghini (6h:23m:17s) | 1. Ford Escort RS Cosworth; 2. Ford Escort RS Cosworth; 3. Lancia Delta HF Integrale |
| (Kenya) Safari Rally | 8 April–12 April | 1. (Finland) Juha Kankkunen (+3m:54s penalties); 2. (Finland) Markku Alén (+4m:03s penalties); 3. (Kenya) Ian Duncan (+5m:24s penalties) | 1. Toyota Celica Turbo 4WD; 2. Toyota Celica Turbo 4WD; 3. Toyota Celica Turbo 4WD |
| (France) Tour de Corse | 2 May–4 May | 1. (France) François Delecour (6h:14m:41s); 2. (France) Didier Auriol (6h:15m:43s); 3. (France) François Chatriot (6h:17m:23s) | 1. Ford Escort RS Cosworth; 2. Toyota Celica Turbo 4WD; 3. Toyota Celica Turbo 4WD |
| (Greece) Acropolis Rally | 30 May–1 June | 1. (Italy) Miki Biasion (6h:54m:35s); 2. (Spain) Carlos Sainz (6h:55m:48s); 3. (Germany) Armin Schwarz (6h:57m:19s) | 1. Ford Escort RS Cosworth; 2. Lancia Delta HF Integrale; 3. Mitsubishi Lancer RS |
| Rally Argentina | 14 July–17 July | 1. (Finland) Juha Kankkunen (5h:32m:31s); 2. (Italy) Miki Biasion (5h:34m:25s); 3. (France) Didier Auriol (5h:49m:29s) | 1. Toyota Celica Turbo 4WD; 2. Ford Escort RS Cosworth; 3. Toyota Celica Turbo 4WD |
| Rally New Zealand | 5 August–8 August | 1. (United Kingdom) Colin McRae (6h:12m:31s); 2. (France) François Delecour (6h:12m:58s); 3. (France) Didier Auriol (6h:13m:00s) | 1. Subaru Legacy RS; 2. Ford Escort RS Cosworth; 3. Toyota Celica Turbo 4WD |
| (Finland) 1000 Lakes Rally | 27 August–29 August | 1. (Finland) Juha Kankkunen (4h:23m:51s); 2. (Finland) Ari Vatanen (4h:24m:38s); 3. (France) Didier Auriol (4h:26m:01s) | 1. Toyota Celica Turbo 4WD; 2. Subaru Impreza 555; 3. Toyota Celica Turbo 4WD |
| Rally Australia | 18 September–21 September | 1. (Finland) Juha Kankkunen (5h:19m:58s); 2. (Finland) Ari Vatanen (5h:25m:50s); 3. (France) François Delecour (5h:43m:42s) | 1. Toyota Celica Turbo 4WD; 2. Subaru Legacy RS; 3. Ford Escort RS Cosworth |
| (Italy) Rallye Sanremo | 11 October–13 October | 1. (Italy) Gianfranco Cunico (6h:19m:40s); 2. (Belgium) Patrick Snijers (6h:21m:18s); 3. (Italy) Gilberto Pianezzola (6h:30m:08s) | 1. Ford Escort RS Cosworth; 2. Ford Escort RS Cosworth; 3. Lancia Delta HF Integrale |
| (Spain) Rally Catalunya | 2 November–4 November | 1. (France) François Delecour (5h:36m:19s); 2. (France) Didier Auriol (5h:37m:19s); 3. (Finland) Juha Kankkunen (5h:40m:28s) | 1. Ford Escort RS Cosworth; 2. Toyota Celica Turbo 4WD; 3. Toyota Celica Turbo 4WD |
| (United Kingdom) RAC Rally | 21 November–24 November | 1. (Finland) Juha Kankkunen (6h:25m:48s); 2. (Sweden) Kenneth Eriksson (6h:27m:32s); 3. (United Kingdom) Malcolm Wilson (6h:30m:51s) | 1. Toyota Celica Turbo 4WD; 2. Mitsubishi Lancer RS; 3. Ford Escort RS Cosworth |
