= Subaru Vivio =

Series KK3/KK4/KW3/KW4/KY3
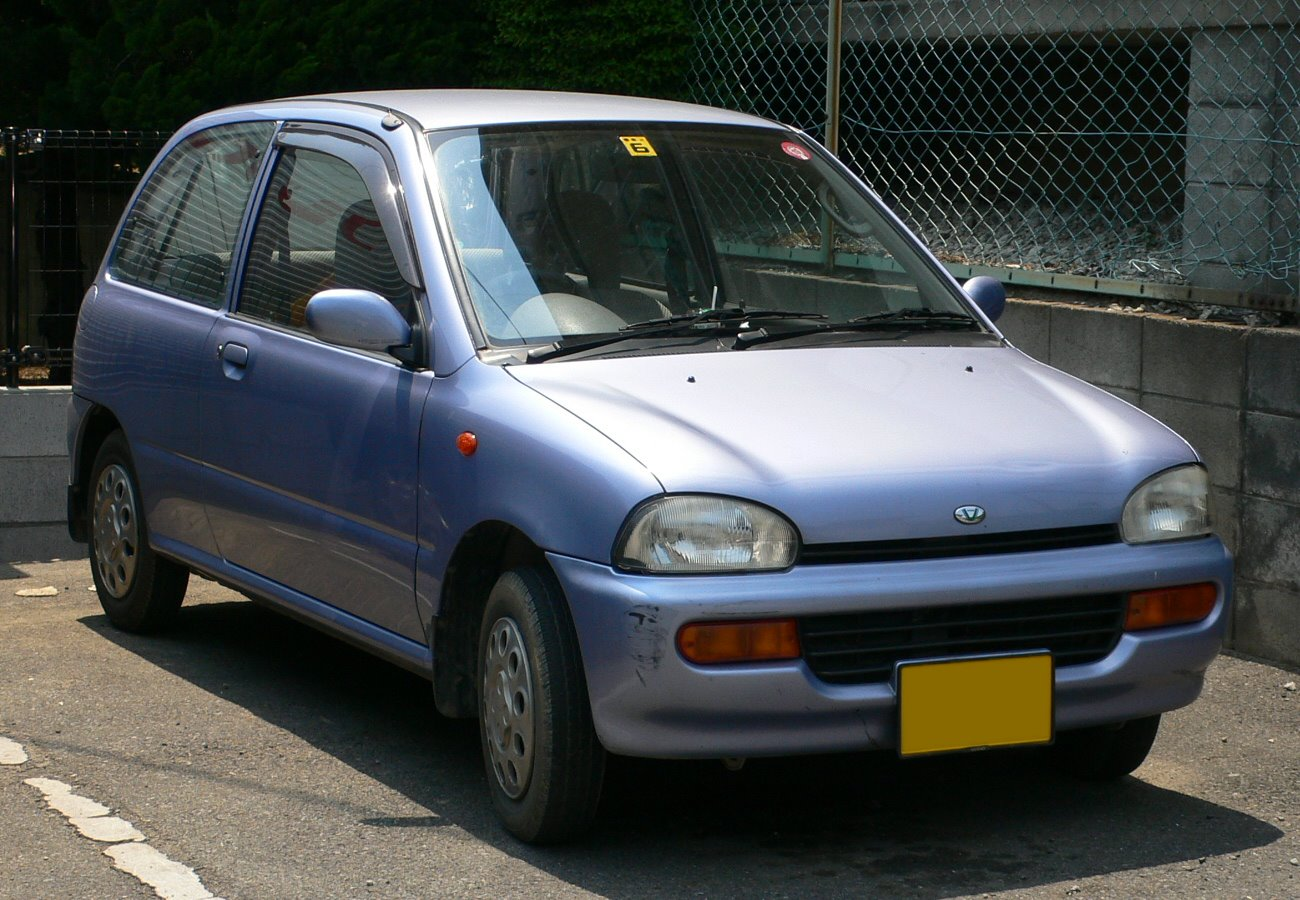

Overview
- Manufacturer: Subaru; Takada Kogyo, Yokohama (T-top)
- Production: 1992–1998
- Assembly: Subaru-chō Plant, Ōta, Gunma, Japan

Body and chassis
- Class: Kei car
- Body style: 3-door hatchback/van 5-door hatchback 2-door targa top
- Layout: Front-engine, front-wheel drive / four-wheel drive

Powertrain
- Engine: 658 cc EN07A carbureted I4; 658 cc EN07E MPI I4; 658 cc EN07Z supercharged I4; 658 cc EN07X SC DOHC 16V I4
- Transmission: 5-speed manual 3-speed automatic ECVT; Paddle shift

Dimensions
- Length: 3,295 mm (129.7 in)
- Width: 1,395 mm (54.9 in)
- Height: 1,385 mm (54.5 in)
- Curb weight: 650 kg (1,433 lb)-700 kg (1,543 lb)

Chronology
- Predecessor: Subaru Rex
- Successor: Subaru Pleo

The Subaru Vivio is a kei car that was introduced in March 1992, and manufactured by Subaru until October 1998. It is small enough to place it in the kei car class, giving its owners large tax breaks in Japan. The Vivio has a spacious interior considering its small size, thanks to a relatively tall profile and large windows. The name "Vivio" is a reference to the engine's displacement of 660 written in an approximation of Roman numerals (VI, VI, O), and also inspired by the word vivid. It replaced the Rex nameplate that was introduced in the 1970s, and was itself superseded by the Subaru Pleo. The Vivio was available in 3 and 5-door versions, with a two-door targa top version named T-top also available.

== Drivetrain ==
The Vivio was available with a variety of 658 cc naturally aspirated or supercharged four-cylinder "Clover" engines with different gearbox options (including ECVT – an electronically controlled continuously variable transmission) and multiple trim packages. Aside from the top-of-the-line RX-R, all engines were SOHC 8-valve designs. The ECVT equipped supercharged model claimed 64 PS (47 kW) with such a setup, and while the Twin Cam 16-valve RX-R version claimed to make no more power than the SOHC, this was only to stay within the limitations laid down by Japan's kei car legislations. Claimed torque was higher, at 88 N⋅m (65 lb⋅ft) versus 84 N⋅m (62 lb⋅ft). Front- or four-wheel drive versions were offered on most of the lineup.

The most common version of the Vivio has a multi-point fuel-injected EN07E engine. This produces 52 PS (38 kW) in manual transmission cars, while ECVT cars have 48 PS (35 kW). 44 PS (32 kW) DIN was claimed in Europe for the same engine. There was also a carbureted version with 42 PS (31 kW) in Japan, which equipped the Vivio Van versions (two-seater and ef-s).

The Vivio RX-SS, introduced in May 1997, was basically an RX-R with the ECVT transmission, be it that the transmission could also be used in manual mode ('SportShift') as a regular 6-speed transmission.

== History ==
The Vivio was sold in many European markets, where it is unusual in not receiving a larger engine than in the home market. The preceding Subaru Rex, the Suzuki Alto, and the Daihatsu Cuore all utilized larger engines when sold in Europe, but the Vivio's technical specifications were nearly identical to the Japanese Domestic Market version - including fuel injection, while its kei competitors still had carbureted engines in export trim.

In May 1993 the Vivio T-top arrived, available only for special order. Only 3,000 were released, to celebrate Subaru's 40th anniversary, fitted with the fuel-injected EN07E engine and either a five-speed manual or the ECVT transmission. The T-top version was built by Takada Kogyo, a convertible specialist who also assembled Nissan's Figaro and Silvia Varietta amongst other specialty cars. An additional 1,000 GX-T models were released in February 1994; these are fitted with the SOHC supercharged engine from the GX (EN07Z), only available coupled to the ECVT.

In November 1995 the Vivio Bistro was introduced. This was a modified version with a retro theme, with Mini-esque front and rear fascias, matching upholstery and modifications to the dashboard. The Bistro series became a hit, causing Subaru to release multiple succeeding versions of the Bistro, called the "Bistro B-Custom", the "Bistro Chiffon", the "Bistro White Edition", the "L Bistro", the "Sports Bistro" with BBS wheels, the "Bistro SS" using the engine package from the Vivio RX-SS, and the "Club Bistro" with a British black cab appearance. The trend of retro-styled cars was quite popular in 1990s Japan, following the success of Nissan's "Pike" series cars like the Pao and Figaro. Subaru also tried this approach with the larger Subaru Impreza in a trim called the Casa Blanca with limited success.

The suspension setup used was inspired by the Legacy, a setup that avoided strictly using MacPherson struts to save on production costs.

=== Gallery ===
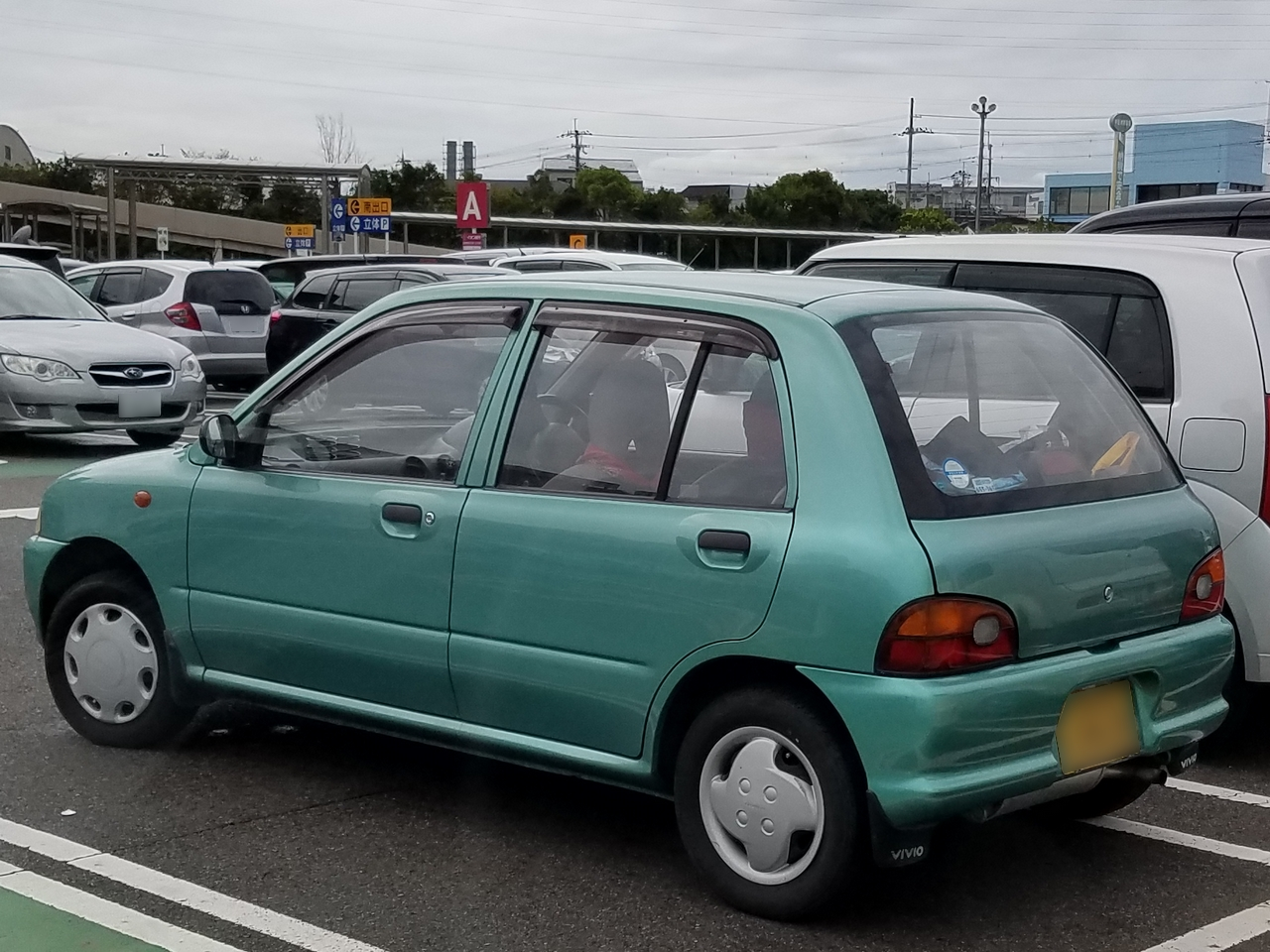
Rear view of Vivio el-s 5-door (JDM)

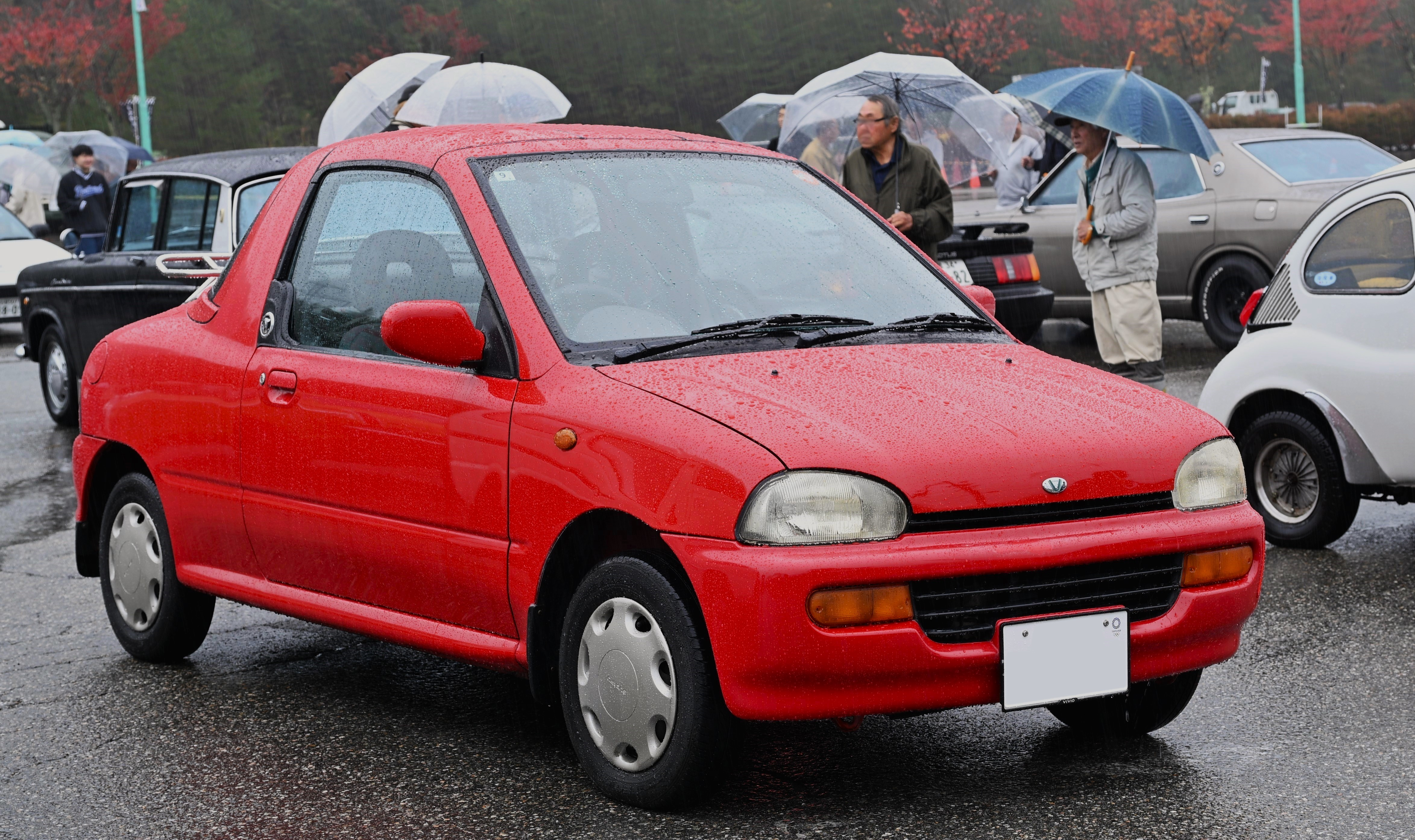
Subaru Vivio T-Top (JDM)

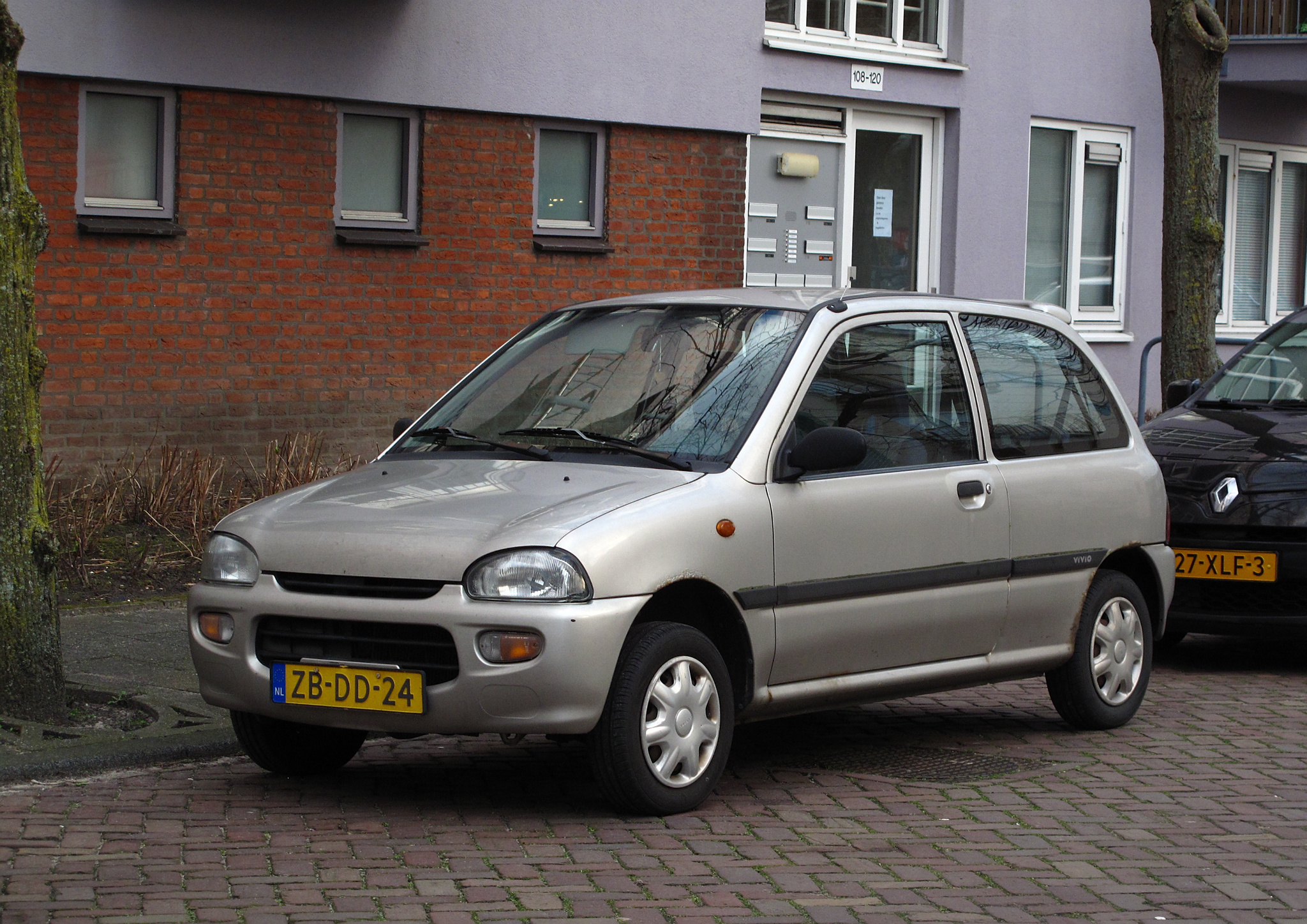
Vivio 660 GLi 3-door (Europe)

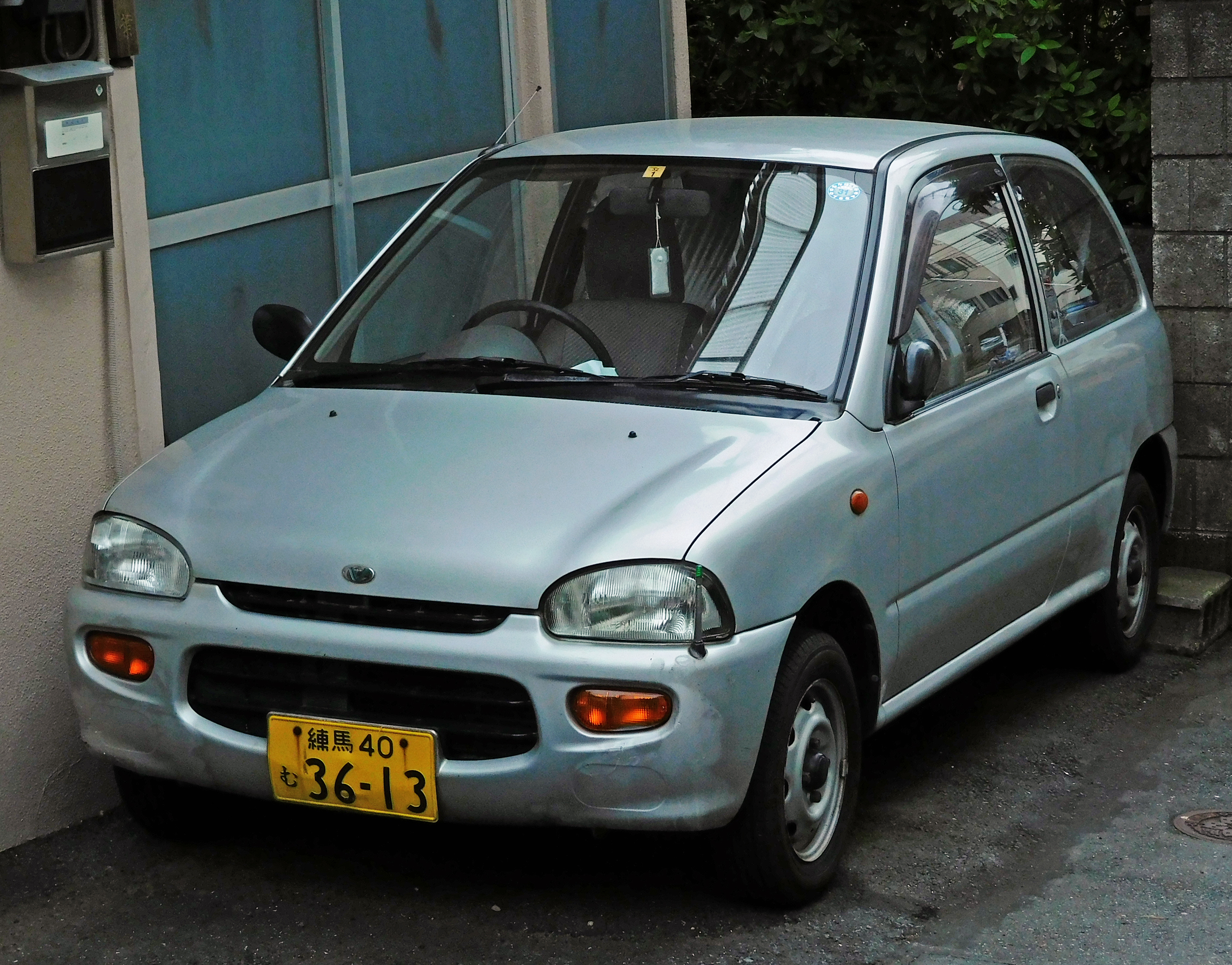
Vivio 2-seater Van (JDM)

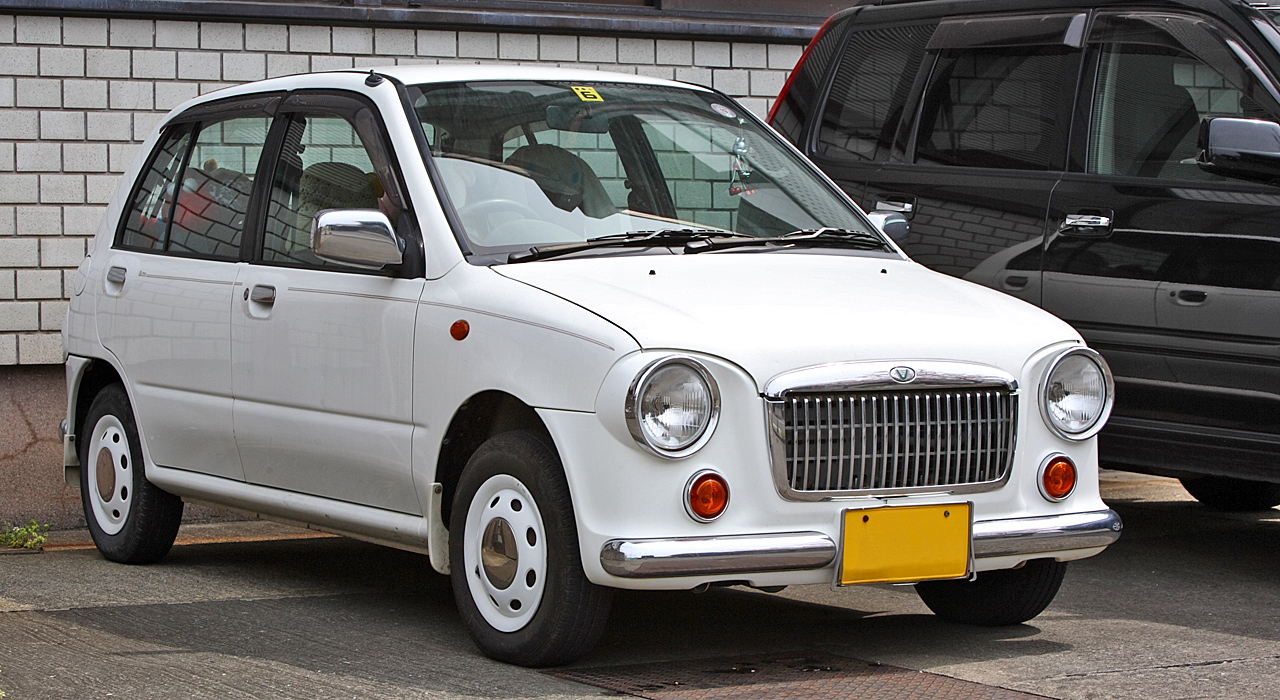
Subaru Vivio Bistro White Edition (JDM)

== Motorsport ==
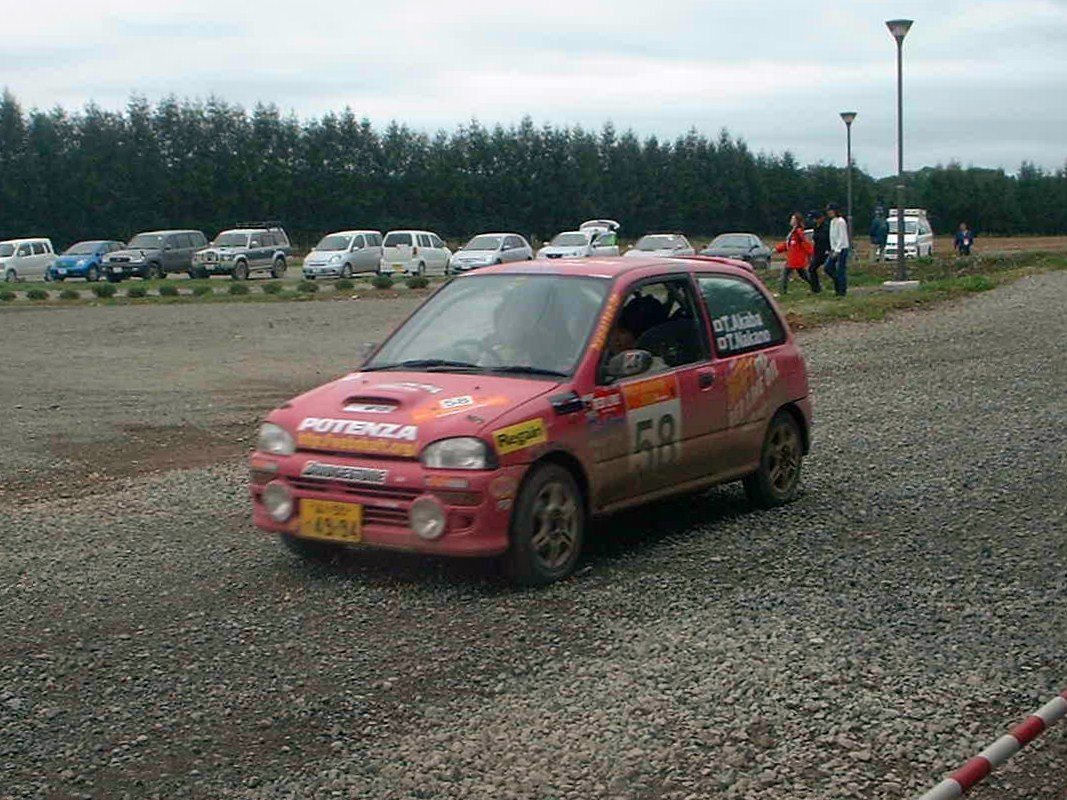
Subaru Vivio in the 2002 Rally Hokkaido.

The supercharged RX-R and RX-RA was widely used for rallying in Japan. RX-RA was a motorsports trim grade with closer ratio gearing and stiffer suspensions than RX-R. Some entrants still enter Vivios at WRC Rally Japan.

In 1992, at the Paris-Beijing marathon raid, a private entrant ran the Vivio RX-R with the EN07X engine. Most people who saw the car thought it wouldn't last long, but it was faster than the Mitsubishi Pajero works team during the prologue stage, and ran for more than a week until it broke its suspension. The car made it to the finishing line unofficially after repairs were carried out, with no other serious troubles.

The most famous appearance of the Vivio in an international motorsport event was in the 1993 round of the Safari Rally under the control of former factory driver and Subaru Technica International founder and team owner Noriyuki Koseki to promote the car. He made the decision to enter three of the sports model Vivio Super KK driven by Masashi Ishida, local driver Patrick Njiru and up and coming WRC star Colin McRae in his Safari debut. "Super KK" is the FIA homologation name for the RX-R grade, and in rally trim the 658 cc engine produced 85 PS (63 kW; 84 hp) at 6,000 rpm.

Only Njiru finished the race, achieving 12th place. McRae did manage to set the fastest stage time before going for two stages in Makindu before retiring with suspension failure on Special Stage 16. He later said "You can hide the whole car in every single pothole along the route!" Ishida had to retire with head gasket failure on Special Stage 45.

This appearance was satirized by cartoonist Jim Bamber for the Yumping Yarns cartoon of Car & Car Conversions magazine, in which he depicted McRae driving his Vivio underneath an elephant.
