= David Boddy =

Chief executive of Coventry City Football Club

David Boddy is currently chief executive of Coventry City Football Club. Boddy was appointed chief executive in June 2017. During his time at Coventry City, the club has achieved promotion from Sky Bet League Two in 2018 and Sky Bet League One in 2020. Boddy was instrumental in agreeing the club's new agreement to play at the Ricoh Arena in March 2021, followed a period playing at St Andrew's Stadium in Birmingham after a dispute between the owners of the Football Club and the owners of the stadium.

Boddy joined the board of Worcester City Football Club in 1999, being a board member for 10 years, including serving as chairman from 2003 until 2009.

After this, Boddy had a spell at the Football Conference (now the National League) from January 2010 until January 2013, where he was assistant general manager and a director of the League.

In 2013 he became chief executive at Newport County. He became the club's first chief executive and has oversaw and masterminded the club's off the field transition from a Non-League Club to a Football League Club, having been responsible for the non football Business development, administration, operational and policy making. He left in 2015.
