= Ed Ordynski =

Australian rally driver (born 1955)

Personal information
- Nationality: (Australia) Australian

World Rally Championship record
- Years active: (Group N) 1989 - 2001
- Teams: Mitsubishi
- Rallies: 28
- Championships: 0
- Rally wins: 9
- Podiums: 0
- Stage wins: 70+
- Total points: 122
- First rally: 1989 Rally Australia
- First win: 1989
- Last win: 2001
- Last rally: 2001 Rally Australia

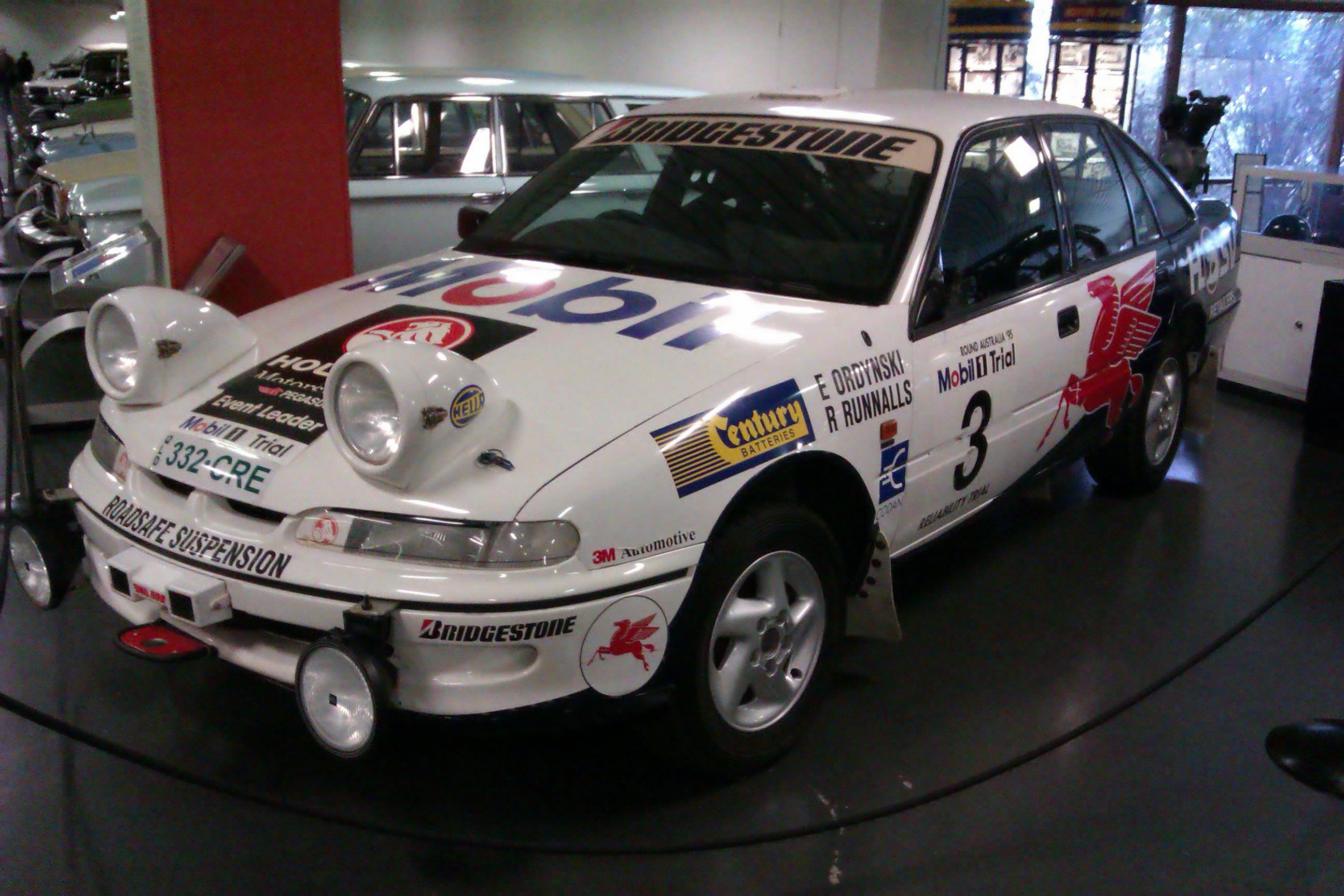
The Holden Commodore (VR) in which Ed Ordynski and Ross Runnalls won the 1995 Mobil 1 Trial

Edward David Ordynski (born 21 July 1955) is an Australian former rally driver. He served as Chairman of the Australian Rally Commission (ARCom) in 2007.

Ordynski is best known for his exploits driving Mitsubishi cars. Driving a Galant VR-4, he won the Australian Rally Championship in 1990. He also won the Group N category that year, and went on to win that category three more times (1993, 1994, 1995), driving a Lancer Evolution.

Ordynski won the 1995 Mobil 1 Round Australia Trial driving a Holden Commodore (VR) entered by the Mobil Bridgestone Rally Team. He also drove 5.0 Litre Touring Cars in 1995, recording a tenth place in the 1995 Sandown 500, and a retirement in the 1995 Tooheys 1000 at Bathurst in a Holden Commodore (VP).

Away from rallying and motorsport, Ordynski was a Year 5 Primary school teacher at Mitcham Primary School circa 1982.

== See also ==
- Confederation of Australian Motor Sport (CAMS)

Preceded by Greg Carr	Winner of the Australian Rally Championship; 1990	Succeeded by Rob Herridge
