= Timo Hantunen =

Finnish rally co-driver (1949-2026)

Personal information
- Born: 5 December 1949; Finland
- Died: 25 June 2026 (aged 76)

World Rally Championship record
- Driver: Tommi Mäkinen; Timo Mäkinen; Juha Kankkunen; Mikko Hirvonen; Jari-Matti Latvala

Timo Hantunen (5 December 1949 – 25 June 2026) was a Finnish rally co-driver. A co-driver for Tommi Mäkinen, Timo Mäkinen, Juha Kankkunen, Mikko Hirvonen and Jari-Matti Latvala, he competed at the World Rally Championship between 1974 to 2012, and won five times at the European Rally Championship between 1989 to 1995.

Hantunen died from cancer on 25 June 2026, at the age of 76.
