= Louise Aitken-Walker =

British rally driver (born 1960)

Louise Aitken-Walker MBE
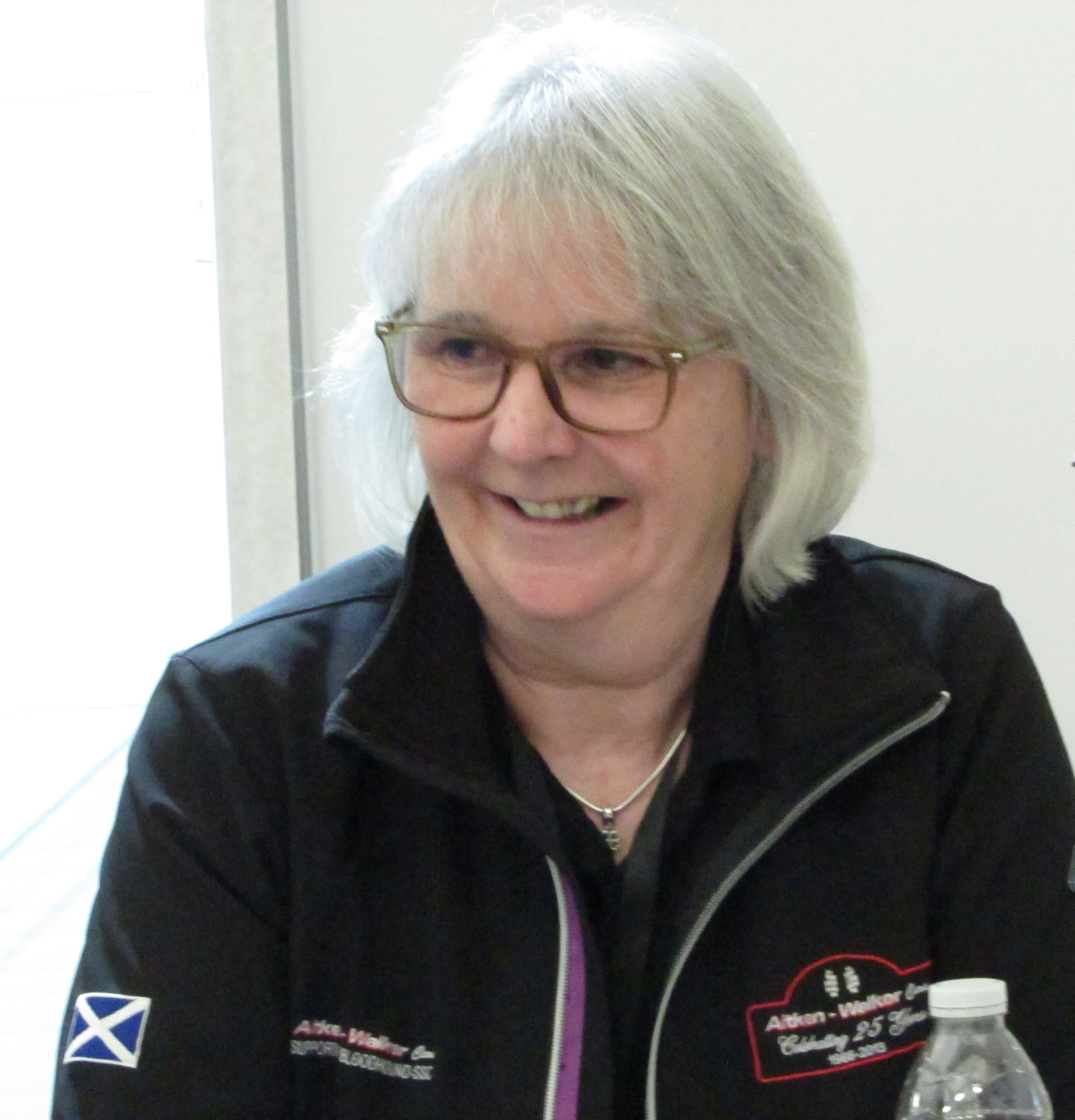
- Aitken-Walker in 2023

Personal information
- Nationality: (United Kingdom) British
- Born: 21 January 1960 (age 66); Duns, Berwickshire, Scotland

World Rally Championship record
- Years active: 1979 - 1991
- Co-driver: (United Kingdom) Jan Williamson (United Kingdom) Ellen Morgan (Sweden) Tina Thörner
- Teams: Ford; Nissan; Opel; Vauxhall
- Rallies: 22
- Championships: 0
- Rally wins: 0
- Podiums: 0
- Stage wins: 0
- Total points: 1
- First rally: 1979 RAC Rally
- Last rally: 1991 RAC Rally

Louise Dunn Aitken-Walker MBE (born January 1960 in Duns, Berwickshire) is a British rally and racing driver. Aitken-Walker entered competition in 1979 and finished 19th in her first Rally GB two years later. She contested the 1989 British Touring Car Championship in a Class C Vauxhall Astra finishing fifth in points, and in 1990, was the first ever Ladies World Champion, the pinnacle of a successful 14-year career. She was awarded the Segrave Trophy in 1990. She retired in 1993 to have a family (son John and daughter Gina) and concentrate on her business affairs. She runs Aitken-Walker Cars, which specializes in quality used cars, with her husband Graham in the Scottish Borders.

In September 2008, Aitken-Walker took part in the Colin McRae Forest Stages Rally, a round of the Scottish Rally Championship centred in Perth in Scotland. A historic Talbot Sunbeam Lotus was her chosen car for the event. She was one of a number of ex-world and British champions to take part in the event in memory of McRae, who died in 2007.

Aitken-Walker was inducted into the Scottish Sports Hall of Fame in 2002.

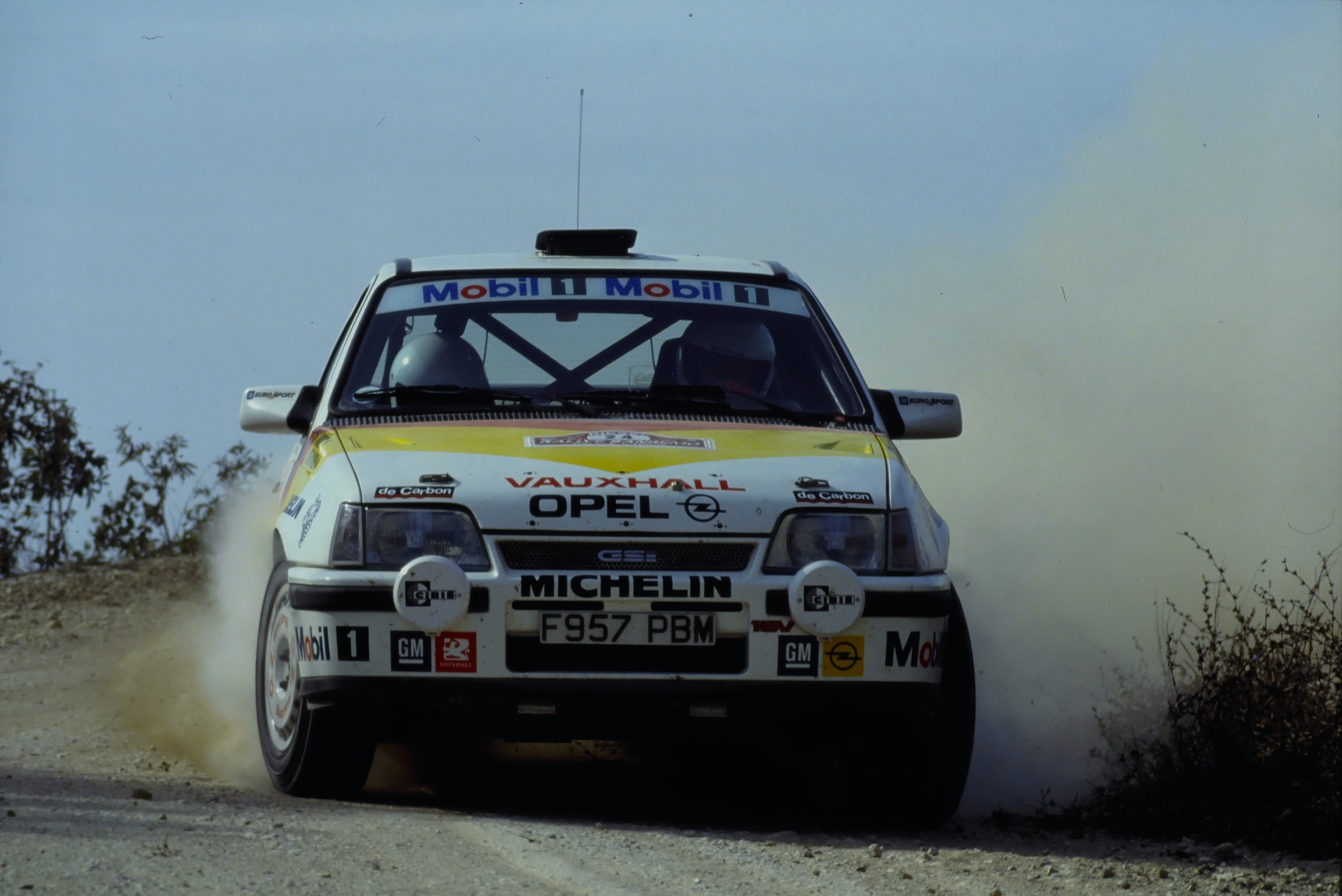
Aitken-Walker and co-driver Tina Thorner shared this Opel Kadett throughout 1990 Sanremo rally stages

== Racing record ==
=== Complete WRC results ===
Year	Entrant	Car	1	2	3	4	5	6	7	8	9	10	11	12	13	14	WDC	Pts
1979	Louise Aitken	Ford Fiesta	MON	SWE	POR	KEN	GRE	NZL	FIN	CAN	ITA	FRA	GBR; Ret	CIV			NC	0
1980	Mogil Motors	Ford Fiesta	MON	SWE	POR	KEN	GRC	ARG	FIN	NZL	ITA	FRA	GBR; Ret	CIV			NC	0
1981	M.C.D. Services	Ford Escort RS2000	MON	SWE	POR	KEN	FRA	GRE	ARG	BRA	FIN	ITA	CIV	GBR; 19			NC	0
1982	M.C.D. Services	Ford Escort RS2000	MON	SWE	POR	KEN	FRA	GRE	NZL	BRA	FIN	ITA	CIV	GBR; 20			NC	0
1983	Louise Aitken	Alfa Romeo Alfasud TI	MON; 48														NC	0
1983	Louise Aitken	Ford Escort XR3i		SWE; 60	POR	KEN	FRA	GRE	NZL	ARG	FIN	ITA	CIV				NC	0
1983	British Junior Rally Team	Ford Escort RS1600												GBR; Ret			NC	0
1984	R.E.D.	Ford Escort RS1600	MON	SWE; 23	POR	KEN	FRA	GRE	NZL	ARG	FIN	ITA	CIV	GBR; Ret			NC	0
1985	Peugeot Talbot Sport	Peugeot 205 GTI	MON	SWE	POR	KEN	FRA	GRE	NZL	ARG	FIN	ITA	CIV	GBR; 16			NC	0
1986	Team Nissan Europe	Nissan 240RS	MON	SWE	POR	KEN	FRA	GRE	NZL	ARG	FIN	CIV	ITA	GBR; 15	USA		NC	0
1987	Peugeot Talbot Sport	Peugeot 205 GTI	MON	SWE	POR	KEN	FRA	GRE	USA	NZL	ARG	FIN	CIV	ITA	GBR; Ret		NC	0
1988	Peugeot Talbot Sport	Peugeot 205 GTI	MON	SWE	POR	KEN	FRA	GRE	USA	NZL	ARG	FIN	CIV	ITA	GBR; Ret		NC	0
1989	Vauxhall Dealer Sport	Vauxhall Astra GTE	SWE	MON	POR	KEN	FRA	GRE	NZL	ARG	FIN	AUS	ITA	CIV	GBR; 18		NC	0
1990	GM Euro Sport	Vauxhall Astra GTE	MON; 11											GBR; 17			NC	0
1990	GM Euro Sport	Opel Kadett GSI		POR; Ret	KEN	FRA; Ret	GRC	NZL; 11	ARG	FIN	AUS; 13	ITA; 18	CIV				NC	0
1991	Mobil 1 / Ford Cellular	Ford Sierra Cosworth RS 4x4	MON	SWE	POR	KEN	FRA	GRC	NZL	ARG	FIN	AUS	ITA	CIV	ESP	GBR; 10	62nd	1

=== Complete British Touring Car Championship results ===
(key) (Races in bold indicate pole position in class) (Races in italics indicate fastest lap in class - 1 point awarded all races)

Year	Team	Car	Class	1	2	3	4	5	6	7	8	9	10	11	12	13	DC	Pts	Class
1989	Vauxhall Motorsport	Vauxhall Astra GTE 16v	C	OUL	SIL ovr:20 cls:2	THR ovr:15 cls:1	DON ovr:12 cls:2	THR ovr:16 cls:2	SIL ovr:19 cls:1	SIL ovr:22 cls:2	BRH ovr:15 cls:2	SNE ovr:17 cls:2	BRH ovr:15 cls:2	BIR ovr:17 cls:2	DON ovr:18 cls:2	SIL; Ret	5th	72	**2nd**

== See also ==
List of female World Rally Championship drivers

Awards and achievements
Preceded by Ken Wood	Autosport; National Rally Driver of the Year; 1987	Succeeded by Malcolm Wilson
Preceded by Bob Ives and Joe Ives	Segrave Trophy; 1990	Succeeded by Steve Webster
