= Mike Kirkland (rally driver) =

Kenyan rally driver (born 1947)

Personal information
- Nationality: (Kenya) Kenyan
- Born: 1 August 1947 (age 79); Nairobi, Kenya

World Rally Championship record
- Years active: 1973, 1975, 1978–1991
- Co-driver: (Kenya) Bruce Field (Kenya) Chris Bates (Kenya) Dave Haworth (Kenya) Yvonne Mehta (Kenya) Anton Levitan (Kenya) Mike Doughty (Kenya) Rob Combes (Kenya) Robin Nixon (Kenya) Surinder Thatthi
- Teams: Datsun, Nissan, Subaru
- Rallies: 24
- Championships: 0
- Rally wins: 0
- Podiums: 5
- Total points: 108
- First rally: 1973 East African Safari Rally
- Last rally: 1991 Safari Rally

Mike Kirkland (born August 1, 1947) is a Kenyan former rally driver from Nairobi, known for his appearances in the World Rally Championship.

Mike Kirkland is a former Kenyan rally driver and businessman, known for winning the Kenya Rally Championship three years in a row (1979, 1980, 1981) and competing in 19 Safari Rallies. He started his career on motorcycles, winning the national championship in 1969 before switching to cars, where he became a successful competitor and a works driver for Nissan. He also received the Kenya Motor Sportsman of the Year award in 1989 and has since built a career in tourism, running a safari company. Early life and career Born in Thika, he was educated in Nyeri and at the Duke of York School (now Lenana School). He began his motorsport career on motorcycles, winning the Kenyan national championship in 1969. Rallying career He switched to rallying and won the Kenya Championship in three consecutive years: 1979, 1980, and 1981. He was a professional works driver for Nissan. Kirkland competed in 19 Safari Rallies and finished 14 of them. In 1989, he was awarded the Kenya Motor Sportsman of the Year. Post-rallying career and business Kirkland became a successful businessman, establishing a safari and tourism company, Southern Cross Safaris. He is also a conservationist, particularly known for his work supporting wildlife in Tsavo. He continues to be involved in motorsports, having participated in events like the Rhino Charge and attending recent Safari Rallies as a driver for photographer Reinhardt Klein.

https://allafrica.com/stories/201104211367.html#:~:text=After%20his%20education%20at%20Nyeri,off%2Droad%20event%2017%20times.

https://nation.africa/kenya/sports/motorsports/mike-kirkland-cow-dung-incident-with-amin-dada-4793020

== Racing record ==
=== Complete IMC results ===
Year	Entrant	Car	1	2	3	4	5	6	7	8	9
1970	Mike Kirkland	Datsun 1600 SSS	MON	SWE	ITA	KEN; 7	AUT	GRE	GBR		
1972	Mike Kirkland	Datsun 1600 SSS	MON	SWE	KEN; Ret	MAR	GRE	AUT	ITA	USA	GBR

=== Complete WRC results ===
Year	Entrant	Car	1	2	3	4	5	6	7	8	9	10	11	12	13	14	WDC	Pts
1973	Mike Kirkland	Datsun 1600 SSS	MON	SWE	POR	KEN; 9	MOR	GRE	POL	FIN	AUT	ITA	USA	GBR	FRA		N/A	N/A
1975	Mike Kirkland	Datsun 260Z	MON	SWE	KEN; Ret	GRE	MOR	POR	FIN	ITA	FRA	GBR					N/A	N/A
1978	Coast Car Hire	Datsun 160J	MON	SWE	KEN; Ret	POR	GRE	FIN	CAN	ITA	CIV	FRA	GBR				N/A	N/A
1979	D.T. Dobie / Team Datsun	Datsun 160J	MON	SWE	POR	KEN; 7	GRE	NZL	FIN	CAN	ITA	FRA	GBR	CIV			44th	4
1980	D.T. Dobie / Team Datsun	Datsun 160J	MON	SWE	POR	KEN; 4	GRC	ARG	FIN	NZL	ITA	FRA	GBR				26th	10
1980	Comafrique	Datsun 160J												CIV; Ret			26th	10
1981	D.T. Dobie / Team Datsun	Datsun 160J	MON	SWE	POR	KEN; 3	FRA	GRC	ARG	BRA	FIN	ITA	CIV	GBR			20th	12
1982	D.T. Dobie & Co	Nissan Violet GTS	MON	SWE	POR	KEN; 3	FRA	GRC	NZL	BRA	FIN<	ITA	CIV	GBR			15th	12
1983	D.T. Dobie & Co	Nissan 240RS	MON	SWE	POR	KEN; Ret	FRA	GRC	NZL	ARG	FIN	ITA	CIV	GBR			NC	0
1984	D.T. Dobie & Co	Nissan 240RS	MON	SWE	POR	KEN; Ret	FRA	GRE	NZL	ARG	FIN	ITA	CIV	GBR			NC	0
1985	D.T. Dobie & Co	Nissan 240RS	MON	SWE	POR	KEN; 3	FRA										9th	26
1985	N.J. Theocarakis SA	Nissan 240RS						GRC; 7									9th	26
1985	Nissan Motor Co. Ltd.	Nissan 240RS											CIV; 4	GBR			9th	26
1985	Subaru Motor Sport	Subaru RX Turbo							NZL; 12	ARG	FIN	ITA					9th	26
1986	Fuji Heavy Industries	Subaru RX Turbo	MON	SWE	POR	KEN; 6	FRA	GRE	NZL; Ret	ARG	FIN	CIV	ITA	GBR	USA		36th	6
1987	Nissan Motorsports International	Nissan 200SX	MON	SWE	POR	KEN; 8	FRA	GRE; 10	USA	NZL	ARG	FIN	CIV; Ret	ITA	GBR		52nd	4
1988	Nissan Motorsports International	Nissan 200SX	MON	SWE	POR	KEN; 2	FRA	GRC	USA	NZL	ARG	FIN	CIV	ITA	GBR		18th	15
1989	Nissan Motorsports International	Nissan 200SX	SWE	MON	POR	KEN; 2	FRA	GRC	NZL	ARG	FIN	AUS	ITA	CIV	GBR		20th	15
1990	Subaru Technica International	Subaru Legacy RS	MON	POR	KEN; Ret	FRA	GRC	NZL; Ret	ARG	FIN	AUS	ITA	CIV	GBR			NC	0
1991	Nissan Motorsports Europe	Nissan Sunny GTI-R	MON	SWE	POR	KEN; 7	FRA	GRE	NZL	ARG	FIN	AUS	ITA	CIV	ESP	GBR	41st	4
