= David Llewellin =

British rally driver (born 1960)

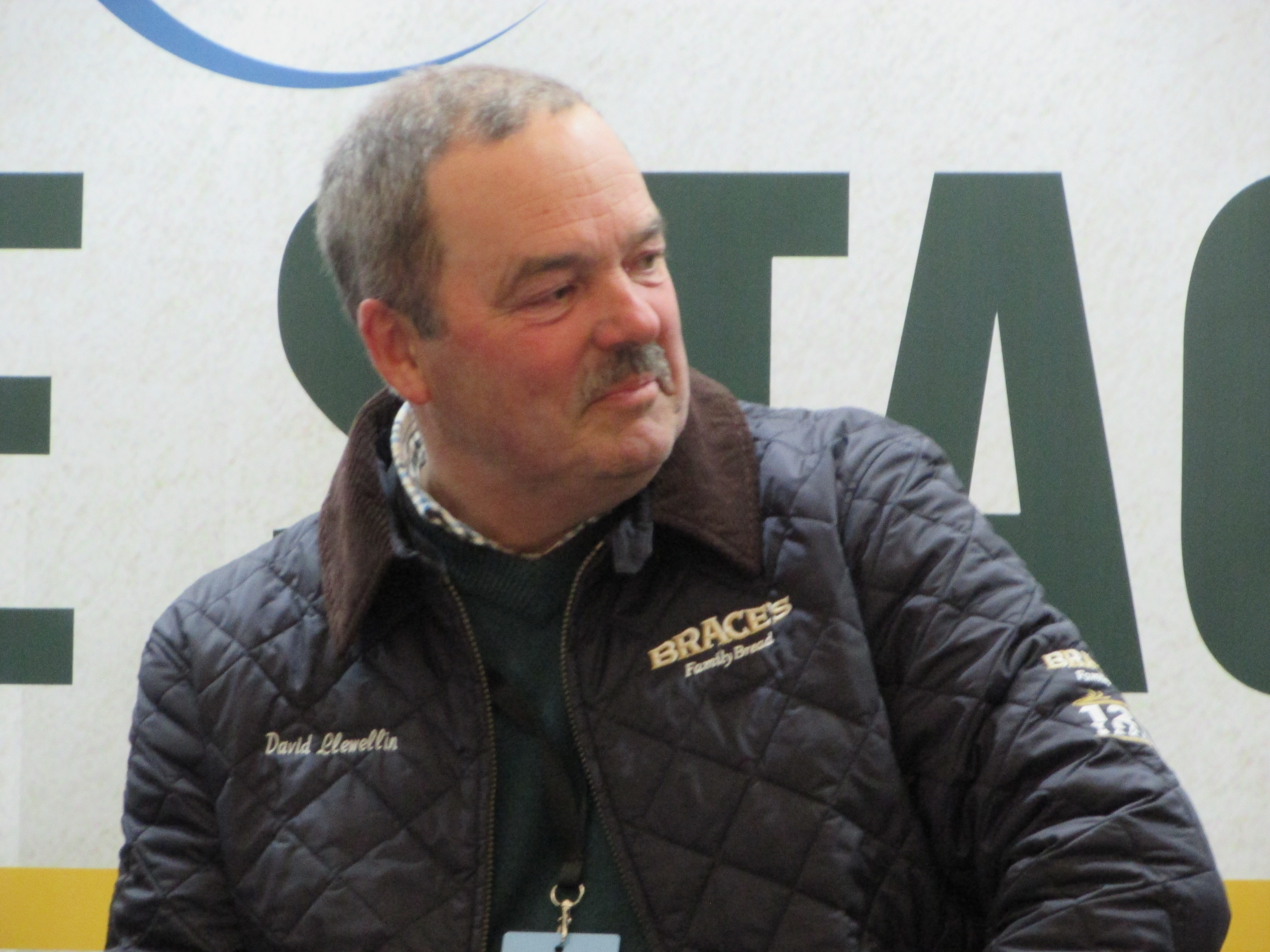
- Llewellin in 2023

Personal information
- Nationality: (Wales) Welsh (United Kingdom) British
- Born: 3 May 1960 (age 66)

World Rally Championship record
- Years active: 1984–1994
- Co-driver: (United Kingdom) Roger Evans (United Kingdom) Phil Short (Germany) Peter Diekmann (United Kingdom) Ian Grindrod
- Teams: Audi, Toyota, Nissan, Vauxhall
- Rallies: 16
- Championships: 0
- Rally wins: 0
- Podiums: 0
- Total points: 14
- First rally: 1984 RAC Rally
- Last rally: 1994 RAC Rally

David Llewellin (born 3 May 1960) is a Welsh rally driver. He was highly successful in the British Rally Championship, winning the title twice in 1989 and 1990, both times at the wheel of a Toyota Celica GT-Four. In the European Rally Championship for drivers, he finished third in 1987, while his highest placing in the World Rally Championship was 36th in 1987.

Llewellin was born in Haverfordwest. In the course of his career, Llewellin drove for a number of different teams reaching a pinnacle during his time with the Toyota team.

Llewellin's son, Ben, is a sports shooter who won a silver medal for Wales in the skeet event at the 2018 Commonwealth Games.

== Racing record ==
=== Complete WRC results ===
Year	Entrant	Car	1	2	3	4	5	6	7	8	9	10	11	12	13	14	WDC	Pts
1984	David Llewellin	Nissan 240RS	MON	SWE	POR	KEN	FRA	GRC	NZL	ARG	FIN	ITA	CIV	GBR; 14			NC	0
1985	Audi Sport UK	Audi Quattro A2	MON	SWE; Ret	POR	KEN	FRA	GRC	NZL	ARG	FIN						NC	0
1985	David Llewellin	Audi 80 Quattro										ITA; Ret	CIV	GBR			NC	0
1986	Austin Rover World Rally Team	MG Metro 6R4	MON	SWE	POR	KEN	FRA	GRE	NZL	ARG	FIN	CIV	ITA	GBR; 9	USA		60th	2
1987	David Llewellin	Audi Coupé Quattro	MON	SWE	POR; 17	KEN	FRA	GRE	USA	NZL	ARG	FIN	CIV	ITA			36th	6
1987	Audi Sport UK	Audi Coupé Quattro													GBR; 6		36th	6
1988	Audi Sport UK	Audi 200 Quattro	MON	SWE	POR; Ret	KEN	FRA	GRC	USA	NZL	ARG	FIN	CIV	ITA			NC	0
1988	David Llewellin	Ford Sierra RS Cosworth													GBR; Ret		NC	0
1989	Toyota Team Great Britain	Toyota Celica GT-Four ST165	SWE	MON	POR	KEN	FRA	GRC	NZL	ARG	FIN	AUS	ITA	CIV	GBR; Ret		NC	0
1990	Toyota Team Great Britain	Toyota Celica GT-Four ST165	MON	POR	KEN	FRA	GRC	NZL	ARG	FIN	AUS	ITA	CIV	GBR; 8			53rd	3
1991	Nissan Motorsports Europe	Nissan Sunny GTI-R	MON	SWE	POR	KEN; Ret	FRA	GRC; 9	NZL	ARG	FIN; 10	AUS	ITA	CIV	ESP	GBR; Ret	54th	3
1993	Vauxhall Motorsport	Vauxhall Astra GSi 16v	MON	SWE	POR	KEN	FRA	GRC	ARG	NZL	FIN	AUS	ITA	ESP	GBR; 12		NC	0
1994	Vauxhall Motorsport	Vauxhall Astra GSi 16v	MON	POR	KEN	FRA	GRC	ARG	NZL	FIN	ITA	GBR; 11					NC	0

Awards and achievements
Preceded by Darryl Weidner	Autosport; National Rally Driver of the Year; 1984	Succeeded by Mark Lovell
Preceded by Malcolm Wilson	Autosport; National Rally Driver of the Year; 1989–1990	Succeeded by Colin McRae
