= Malcolm Wilson (motorsport) =

British rally driver and motorsport executive (born 1956)

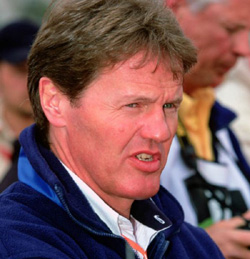

Personal information
- Nationality: (United Kingdom) British
- Full name: Malcolm Irving Wilson
- Born: 17 February 1956 (age 70)

World Rally Championship record
- Years active: 1977–1995
- Co-driver: (United Kingdom) Ron Palmer (United Kingdom) Terry Harryman (United Kingdom) Mike Greasley (United Kingdom) Phil Short (United Kingdom) Nigel Harris (United Kingdom) Mike Broad (United Kingdom) Ian Grindrod (United Kingdom) Nicky Grist (United Kingdom) Bryan Thomas
- Teams: Ford, MG Rover, Vauxhall
- Rallies: 42
- Championships: 0
- Rally wins: 0
- Podiums: 2
- Stage wins: 29
- Total points: 59
- First rally: 1977 RAC Rally
- Last rally: 1995 RAC Rally

Malcolm Irving Wilson, OBE (born 17 February 1956) is a British former rally driver, founder of M-Sport, and incumbent Deputy President for Sport at the Fédération Internationale de l'Automobile (FIA). He is the father of former World Rally Championship driver Matthew Wilson and is married to Elaine Wilson, whom he met in 1979.

== Biography ==
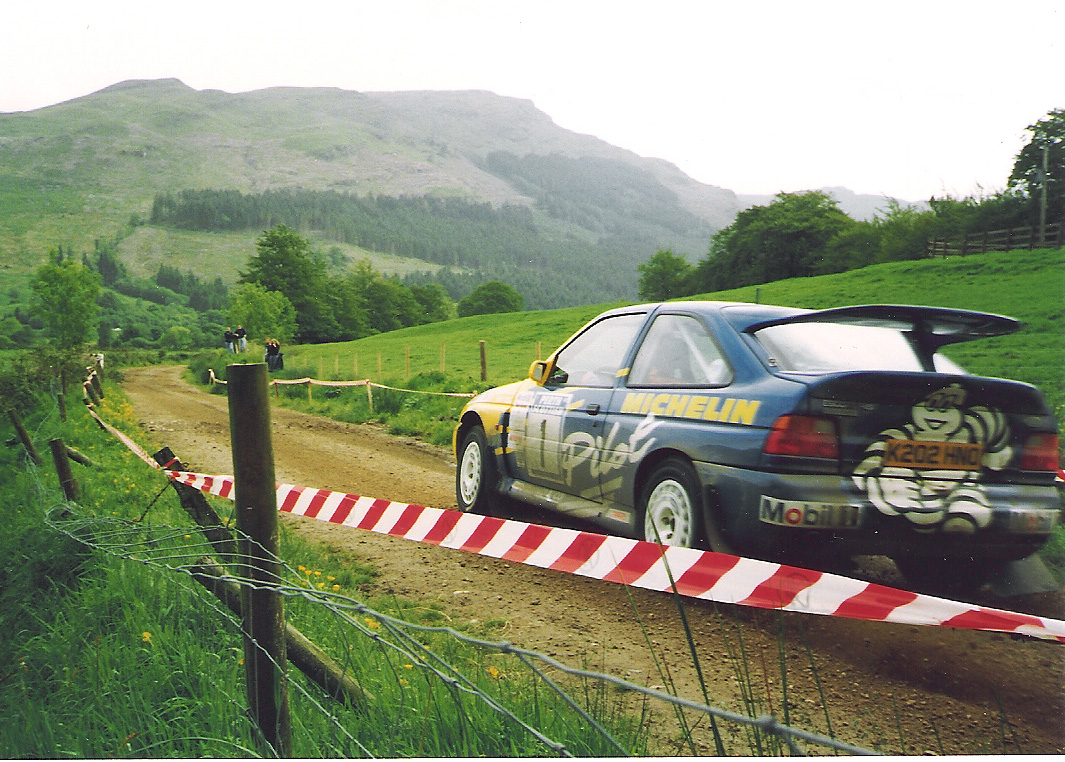
Wilson on a stage rally in Scotland

=== Early life ===
Wilson was raised in Workington, Cumbria, where he spent time at his parents' car breaking business. He acknowledges that meeting customers who were rally drivers introduced him to the sport. His father Ken Wilson has also a rally driving career, the earliest recorded starts being in 1973, one year before Malcolm's first start at age 18 in 1974. In 1979, whilst buying a rally car Wilson met his future wife, Elaine, who was the seller's daughter.

=== Rally driver career ===
Wilson's career began in 1974 driving Ford Escorts in events mainly located in the north of England. In 1976, rallies in the significant British championships were being contested before in 1978, he won the Castrol/Autosport UK National Championship, a series seen as one level below the RAC British Open Championship and being restricted to British nationals only. Wilson repeated the title feat in 1979, winning five of the eight events on the calendar.

Wilson crashed during the 1980 Scottish Rally whilst chasing Hannu Mikkola and Ari Vatanen for the lead, breaking both his ankles and almost ending his career, but he recovered in time for the RAC Rally at the end of the year.

In the 1980s, Wilson gained more experience on international rallies outside the United Kingdom and using the four-wheel drive Audi Quattro cars within, driving for Audi Sport UK on some events whilst remaining loyal to Ford on others. In 1986, he drove for Austin Rover WRT, in whose Group B MG Metro 6R4 he shared driving duties with fellow Briton, Tony Pond. He only finished two of the six World Rally Championship rounds started, and MG finished 8th in the manufacturer's championship. The banning of Group B in the WRC after that year led to the withdrawal of Austin Rover and other manufacturers, and Wilson's rallies remained in the UK for some years after.

In 1989, Wilson drove for Vauxhall/General Motors in the UK and selected WRC rounds. He finished third at that years Rally of New Zealand, one of his best result in the series matched only by another third in 1993 RAC Rally of Great Britain.

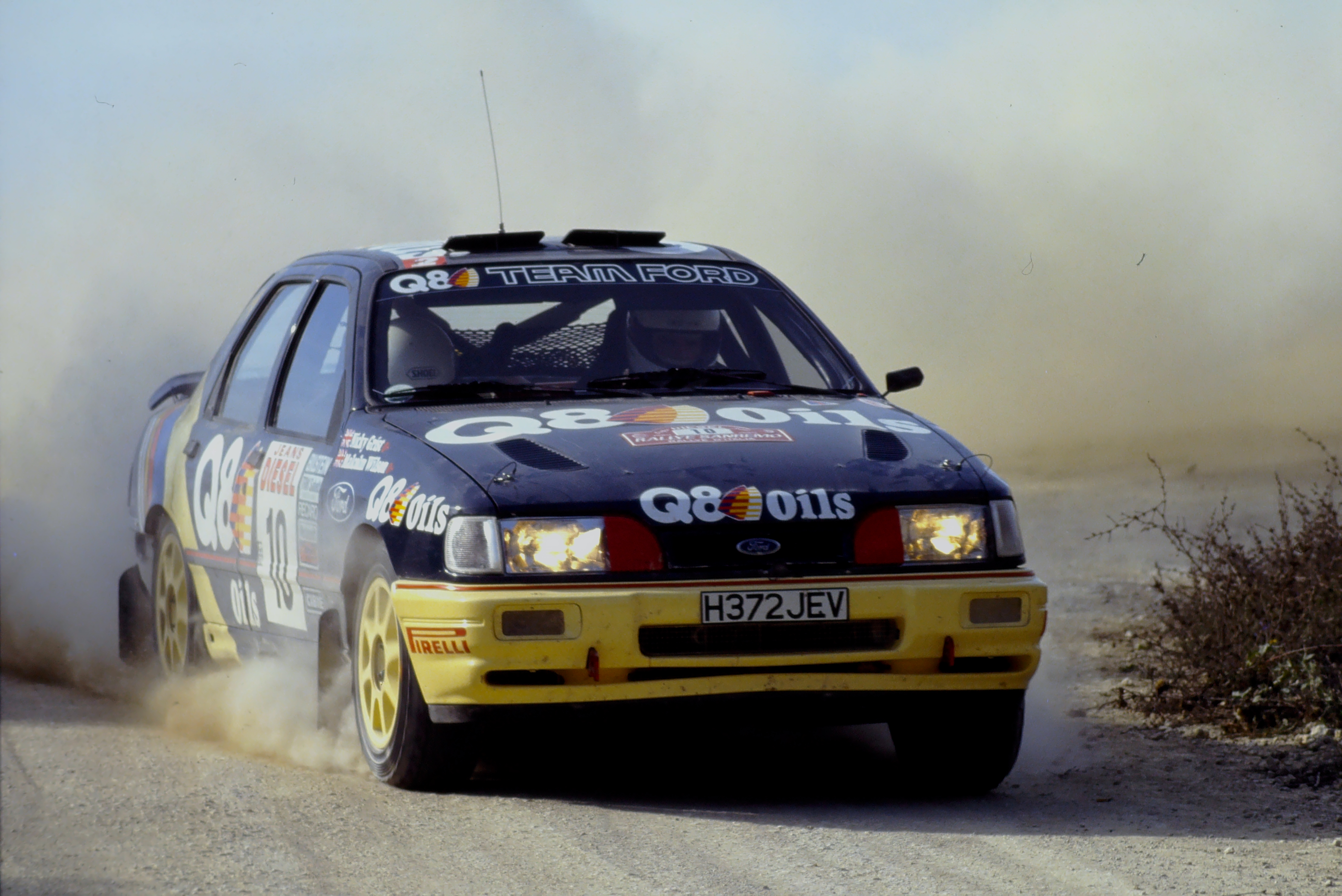
Wilson/Grist (Ford Sierra Gr. A) during 1990 Sanremo rally

In 1990, Wilson began to drive Sierra Cosworths for a Ford team with Nicky Grist co-driving, mostly at British events then as part of a wider WRC programme in 1991. He won the British Rally Championship in 1994 at the wheel of Ford Escorts. In the years after, Wilson has driven occasionally at selected events. In September 2008, Wilson took part in the Colin McRae Forest Stages Rally in a VK Vodka Kick sponsored Ford Escort RS1800 with co-driver Peter Martin. He was one of a number of ex-World and British champions to take part in the event ran in memory of McRae, who died in 2007.

Aside from rallying competition, he was also Ford's chief test driver, developing new rally cars including the short lived RS1700T and RS200 models.

=== M-Sport ===
Wilson formed Malcolm Wilson Motorsport in 1979, primarily to facilitate his own rallying career and offering motorsport services to customers such as rally car preparation. Reflecting his driving career, the company grew steadily through the 1980s and 90s until in 1996, the company was contracted by Ford to run the Ford World Rally Team from the 1997 season. The company became known as M-Sport in 1998. Following the withdrawal of Ford from rallying in 2012, M-Sport have continued to enter the World Rally Championship independently and are the manufacturer of Ford's Groups Rally cars. Other business for the company has included the Ford Raptor Rally-Raid car, Bentley Continental GT3 car preparation and engines for BTCC.

=== Ford World Rally Team ===
After his driving career, he went on to manage and run the Ford World Rally Team with his M-Sport operation, based at Dovenby Hall near Cockermouth in Cumbria.

Their work culminated in 2006 when Wilson led Ford to the World Rally Championship Manufacturers' title for the first time in 25 years; the team repeated this achievement in 2007.

=== Fédération Internationale de l'Automobile ===
In June 2025, Wilson was confirmed as the Deputy President for Sport at the Fédération Internationale de l'Automobile (FIA).

=== Honours ===
Wilson was appointed Officer of the Order of the British Empire (OBE) in the 2009 Birthday Honours. In 2018 he was awarded with the V Class Order of the Cross of Terra Mariana for his services to Estonian motorsport, with his role in the successes of Markko Märtin and Ott Tänak cited.

== Complete WRC results ==
Year	Entrant	Car	1	2	3	4	5	6	7	8	9	10	11	12	13	14	WDC	Points
1977	Malcolm Wilson	Ford Escort RS 2000	MON	SWE	POR	KEN	NZL	GRE	FIN	CAN	ITA	FRA	GBR; 12				–	0
1978	Malcolm Wilson	Ford Escort RS 1800	MON	SWE	KEN	POR	GRE	FIN	CAN	ITA	CIV	FRA	GBR; Ret				–	0
1979	Total Oil	Ford Escort RS 1800	MON	SWE	POR	KEN	GRE	NZL	FIN	CAN	ITA	FRA	GBR; 15	CIV			–	0
1980	Total Oil	Ford Escort RS 1800	MON	SWE	POR	KEN	GRE	ARG	FIN	NZL	ITA	FRA	GBR; Ret	CIV			–	0
1981	Rothmans Rally Team	Ford Escort RS 1800	MON	SWE	POR; Ret	KEN	FRA	GRE; Ret	ARG	BRA	FIN	ITA	CIV	GBR; Ret			–	0
1982	Malcolm Wilson	Ford Escort RS 1800	MON	SWE	POR; Ret	KEN	FRA	GRE	NZL	BRA	FIN	ITA	CIV				66th	1
1982	Audi Sport UK	Audi Quattro												GBR; 10			66th	1
1983	British Junior Rally Team	Ford Escort RS1600i	MON	SWE	POR	KEN	FRA	GRE	NZL	ARG	FIN	ITA	CIV	GBR; 13			–	0
1984	Top Gear	Audi Quattro A1	MON	SWE	POR	KEN	FRA	GRE	NZL	ARG	FIN	ITA	CIV	GBR; Ret			–	0
1985	Malcolm Wilson	Audi Quattro A1	MON	SWE; Ret	POR	KEN	FRA	GRE	NZL	ARG	FIN	ITA	CIV				–	0
1985	Austin Rallying	MG Metro 6R4												GBR; Ret			–	0
1986	Austin Rover World Rally Team	MG Metro 6R4	MON; Ret	SWE; Ret	POR; Ret	KEN	FRA; Ret	GRE	NZL	ARG	FIN; 10	CIV	ITA	GBR; 17	USA		70th	1
1987	GM Dealer Sport	Opel Kadett GSI	MON	SWE	POR	KEN	FRA	GRE	USA	NZL	ARG	FIN	CIV	ITA	GBR; Ret		–	0
1988	Malcolm Wilson	Opel Kadett GSI	MON	SWE; 8	POR	KEN	FRA										–	0
1988	GM Euro Sport	Vauxhall Astra GTE						GRE; Ret	USA	NZL	ARG	FIN	CIV	ITA	GBR; Ret		–	0
1989	Malcolm Wilson	Vauxhall Astra GTE	SWE; 13	MON	POR	KEN	FRA	GRE									18th	19
1989	GM Euro Sport	Vauxhall Astra GTE							NZL; 3	ARG	FIN	AUS; 6	ITA	CIV			18th	19
1989	Vauxhall Dealer Sport	Vauxhall Astra GTE													GBR; 10		18th	19
1990	Q8 Team Ford	Ford Sierra RS Cosworth 4x4	MON	POR	KEN	FRA	GRE	NZL	ARG	FIN; Ret	AUS	ITA; Ret	CIV	GBR; Ret			–	0
1991	Q8 Team Ford	Ford Sierra RS Cosworth 4x4	MON; 7	SWE	POR; Ret	KEN	FRA; 5	GRE; Ret	NZL	ARG	FIN	AUS	ITA; 10	CIV	ESP	GBR; Ret	18th	13
1992	Ford Motor Co Ltd	Ford Sierra RS Cosworth 4x4	MON	SWE	POR	KEN	FRA	GRE	NZL	ARG	FIN	AUS	ITA	CIV	ESP	GBR; 9	58th	2
1993	Ford Motor Co Ltd	Ford Escort RS Cosworth	MON	SWE; Ret	POR	KEN	FRA	GRE	ARG	NZL							19th	12
1993	Malcolm Wilson	Ford Escort RS Cosworth									FIN; Ret	AUS	ITA	ESP			19th	12
1993	Michelin Pilot Team Ford	Ford Escort RS Cosworth													GBR; 3		19th	12
1994	Ford Motor Co Ltd	Ford Escort RS Cosworth	MON	POR	KEN	FRA	GRE; 6	ARG	NZL	FIN		GBR; Ret					23rd	8
1994	Jolly Club	Ford Escort RS Cosworth									ITA; 9						23rd	8
1995	R.A.S. Ford	Ford Escort RS Cosworth	MON	SWE	POR	FRA	NZL	AUS	ESP	GBR; Ret							–	0

== See also ==
- M-Sport
- M-Sport World Rally Team
- Ford World Rally Team

Awards and achievements
Preceded by Louise Aitken-Walker	Autosport; National Rally Driver of the Year; 1988	Succeeded by David Llewellin
Preceded by Richard Burns	Autosport; National Rally Driver of the Year; 1994	Succeeded by Alister McRae
