= Tony Pond =

British rally driver (1945–2002)

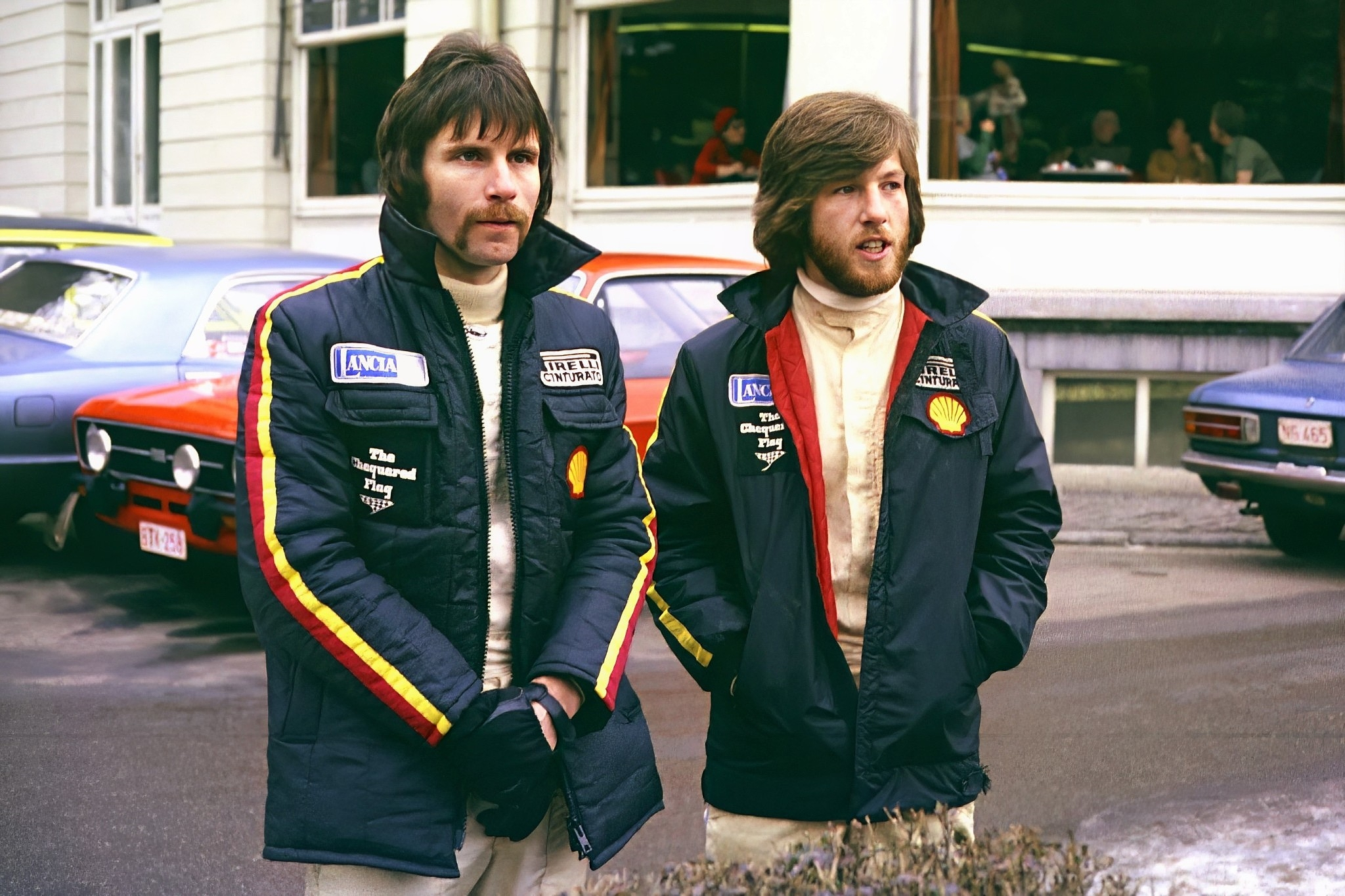
- Tony Pond & co David Richards in 1976

Personal information
- Nationality: (United Kingdom) British
- Born: 23 November 1945
- Died: 7 February 2002 (aged 56)

World Rally Championship record
- Years active: 1974–1986
- Co-driver: (United Kingdom) Frances Cobb (United Kingdom) Mike Wood (United Kingdom) David Richards (United Kingdom) Fred Gallagher (United Kingdom) Pat Carty (United Kingdom) Ian Grindrod (United Kingdom) Mike Nicholson (United Kingdom) Kevin Gormley (United Kingdom) Terry Harryman (United Kingdom) Rob Arthur
- Teams: Triumph, Talbot, Ford, Nissan, MG Rover
- Rallies: 27
- Championships: 0
- Rally wins: 0
- Podiums: 2
- Stage wins: 37
- Total points: 68
- First rally: 1974 RAC Rally
- Last rally: 1986 RAC Rally

Tony Pond (23 November 1945 – 7 February 2002) was a British rally driver.

== Career ==
Pond's first outings in a rally car were on the then regular (in the early '60s) Saturday night road rallies in the home counties around London, driving a Mini Cooper S. Using the same car, he also became successful at auto-testing – the practice of manoeuvering the car against the clock around a series of cones.

Pond then prepared a Lotus Cortina for an attempt on the Lombard RAC Round Britain Rally, and was running in the top twenty when a visit to a ditch in icy conditions put an end to the outing.

At this time, Ford had launched the Mexico Rally Championship, and Pond persuaded the local Ford dealer in his home town, Norman Reeves of Uxbridge, to prepare and supply a car for the Championship. He finished second overall, the reward for which was a drive in a works supported Escort RS1600 on the Scottish International Rally. He finished in the top ten, which was enough incentive for Norman Reeves to prepare and supply him with an ex-factory Escort RS1600 for a season.

Using this car, Pond was a regular top-ten finisher in the British Rally Championship, competing against and beating the likes of Jimmy McRae (Colin's father) and Russell Brookes, culminating in a third place on the Welsh International Rally in 1973, beating Tony Fall into fourth place. At this time Fall was competitions manager for the Dealer Opel Team (DOT), and the offer of a works supported drive was not long in coming.

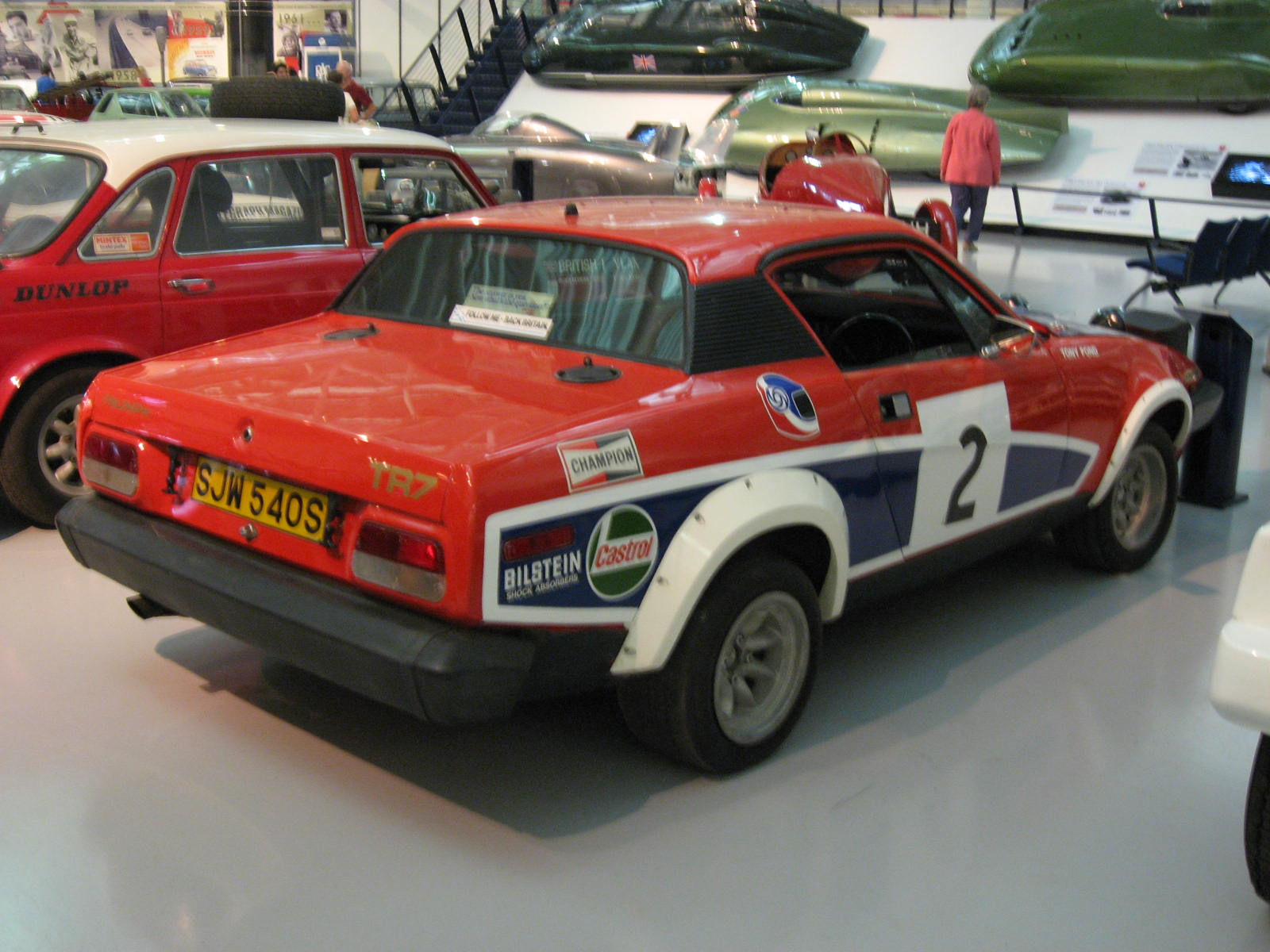
Pond's Triumph TR7 V8.

Unfortunately, although DOT and Pond were successful with the 2 litre Opel Kadett, General Motors had taken the decision to stop selling Opels in the UK and concentrate on the Vauxhall brand, and so DOT was disbanded. In 1975, he won the Avon Tour of Britain driving a privately entered Escort RS2000 - the Tour was a mixture of special stages and race circuits, and rally drivers tended to dominate. Pond was very quickly approached by British Leyland to take on the Triumph TR7. 1976 until 1978, saw him in the Triumph then in 1979 he championed a Talbot Sunbeam Lotus before returning to the TR7 in 1980, completing a number of outings for the British Leyland factory team.

Around 1979-1982, Pond also often visited South Africa on weekends to pilot the factory-entered Datsun Stanza, with navigator Richard Leeke, in the SA National Rally Championship as Datsun's (later Nissan SA) number 1 driver. In 1981, he won the Radio 5 Rally outright against stiff competition like Geoff Mortimer in a Chevrolet Chevair and Jan Hettema, a double-Springbok, in a Toyota Corolla.

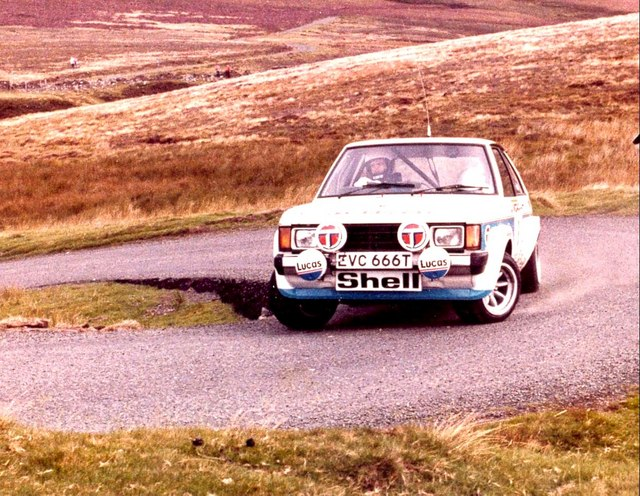
Pond driving a Talbot Sunbeam Lotus at the 1979 Manx International Rally.

1981 through to the end of 1984 had Pond competing with varying success in a varied selection of cars, including the Datsun Violet, Vauxhall Chevette HSR, Nissan Violet, Nissan 240RS and Rover SD1. For the 1985 season, Pond was recruited by the Austin Rover dealer team to drive the Group B MG Metro 6R4. Finishing third overall on the 6R4's international debut at the Lombard R.A.C. Rally, Pond, improving on his fourth place overall in the 1975 and 1978 events, gave the car its best-ever finish on a World Rally event. He stayed with the Austin Rover team until 1986 when the Group B formula was cancelled and the cars banned after a number of fatal accidents.

Pond mostly retired from Rallying at the end of 1986, however, he was retained on Austin Rover's books as a development driver, and was involved in the design and production of the MG F.

In 1988, Pond attempted to achieve the first-ever average 100 mph lap around the Isle of Man TT motorcycle race circuit in a standard-specification production Rover Vitesse, but was unsuccessful, largely due to wet weather on the mountain section of the course. For his second attempt on 6 June 1990, he again drove a demonstration lap using a standard production Rover 827 Vitesse, which became the first production car to average over 100 mph around the course. This feat stood until 2011, when Mark Higgins bettered the time and later improved on his own performances.

=== Touring Cars and One-Make Racing ===
In 1983 and 1984, Pond competed sporadically in touring car racing in Britain and Europe, first in an MG Metro Turbo then a Rover Vitesse. He exclusively drove cars from Austin Rover Group. His best performances were in the British Saloon Car Championship, the highlights being a class win at Donington in 1983 and winning outright Silverstone in 1984 and scoring three other podiums, before ARG withdrew from the series.

In 1987, Pond guested in the MG Maestro Challenge at the Rally Cwm Gwendraith in Wales.

In 1988 and 1989, Pond guested in the MG Metro 6R4 Trophy race in Birmingham, winning both times.

=== Motorcycling ===
Throughout his life, Pond was also a keen motorcyclist, riding fast road bikes and trials bikes successfully.

== Death ==
Pond succumbed to pancreatic cancer in 2002 and is survived by his wife, Nikki, and son, James.

== Racing record ==
=== Complete IMC results ===
| Year | Entrant | Car | 1 | 2 | 3 | 4 | 5 | 6 | 7 |
|---|---|---|---|---|---|---|---|---|---|
| 1970 | Tony Pond | Ford Cortina Lotus | MON | SWE | ITA | KEN | AUT | GRE | GBR; Ret |

=== Complete WRC results ===
| Year | Entrant | Car | 1 | 2 | 3 | 4 | 5 | 6 | 7 | 8 | 9 | 10 | 11 | 12 | 13 | WDC | Pts |
|---|---|---|---|---|---|---|---|---|---|---|---|---|---|---|---|---|---|
| 1974 | Dealer Team Opel | Opel Ascona | POR | KEN | FIN | ITA | CAN | USA | GBR; Ret | FRA | | | | | | N/A | N/A |
| 1975 | Dealer Team Opel | Opel Kadett GT/E | MON | SWE | KEN | GRE | MOR | POR | FIN | ITA | FRA | GBR; 4 | | | | N/A | N/A |
| 1976 | British Leyland Cars | Triumph TR7 | MON | SWE | POR | KEN | GRC | MOR | FIN | ITA | FRA | GBR; Ret | | | | N/A | N/A |
| 1977 | British Leyland Cars | Triumph TR7 | MON | SWE | POR | KEN | NZL | GRC | FIN | CAN | ITA | FRA; Ret | GBR; 8 | | | N/A | N/A |
| 1978 | British Leyland Cars | Triumph TR7 V8 | MON | SWE | KEN | POR | GRE | FIN | CAN | ITA | CIV | FRA; Ret | | | | N/A | N/A |
| 1978 | British Airways | Triumph TR7 V8 | | | | | | | | | | | GBR; 4 | | | N/A | N/A |
| 1979 | Talbot Sport | Talbot Sunbeam Lotus | MON | SWE | POR | KEN | GRE | NZL | FIN | CAN | ITA; 4 | FRA | | | | 22nd | 10 |
| 1979 | Chrysler Competitions Centre | Talbot Sunbeam Lotus | | | | | | | | | | | GBR; Ret | CIV | | 22nd | 10 |
| 1980 | British Leyland Cars | Triumph TR7 V8 | MON | SWE | POR; Ret | KEN | GRC | ARG | FIN | NZL | ITA | FRA | GBR; 7 | CIV | | 50th | 4 |
| 1981 | Team Datsun Europe | Datsun 160J | MON | SWE | POR; 5 | KEN | | | | | | | | | | 16th | 20 |
| 1981 | Team Datsun Europe | Datsun Violet GT | | | | | FRA; 3 | GRC | ARG | BRA | FIN | ITA; Ret | CIV | | | 16th | 20 |
| 1981 | Dealer Team Vauxhall | Vauxhall Chevette 2300 HSR | | | | | | | | | | | | GBR; Ret | | 16th | 20 |
| 1982 | Team Nissan Europe | Nissan Violet GT | MON | SWE | POR; Ret | | | | | | | | | | | 23rd | 10 |
| 1982 | D.T. Dobie & Co | Nissan Violet GTS | | | | KEN; 4 | FRA | | | | | | | | | 23rd | 10 |
| 1982 | N.I. Theocharakis S.A. | Nissan Violet GTS | | | | | | GRE; Ret | | | | | | | | 23rd | 10 |
| 1982 | Nissan Motor Co Ltd. | Nissan Violet GTS | | | | | | | NZL; Ret | BRA | FIN | ITA | CIV | | | 23rd | 10 |
| 1982 | Blydenstein Racing | Vauxhall Chevette 2300 HSR | | | | | | | | | | | | GBR; Ret | | 23rd | 10 |
| 1983 | Team Nissan Europe | Nissan 240RS | MON | SWE | POR | KEN | FRA; 6 | GRE | NZL | ARG | FIN | ITA | CIV | GBR | | 28th | 6 |
| 1984 | Unipart Rallying | Rover Vitesse | MON | SWE | POR | KEN | FRA | GRE | NZL | ARG | FIN | ITA | CIV | GBR; Ret | | NC | 0 |
| 1985 | Computervision Rallying with Mobil | MG Metro 6R4 | MON | SWE | POR | KEN | FRA | GRE | NZL | ARG | FIN | ITA | CIV | GBR; 3 | | 20th | 12 |
| 1986 | Austin Rover World Rally Team | MG Metro 6R4 | MON; Ret | SWE | POR; Ret | KEN | FRA; Ret | GRE | NZL | ARG | FIN | CIV | ITA; Ret | GBR; 6 | USA | 36th | 6 |

=== Complete British Saloon Car Championship results ===
(key) (Races in bold indicate pole position; races in italics indicate fastest lap.)

| Year | Team | Car | Class | 1 | 2 | 3 | 4 | 5 | 6 | 7 | 8 | 9 | 10 | 11 | DC | Pts | Class |
|---|---|---|---|---|---|---|---|---|---|---|---|---|---|---|---|---|---|
| 1983 | Unipart with Daily Express | MG Metro Turbo | B | SIL | OUL | THR | BRH; Ret | THR ovr:6 cls:2 | SIL; Ret | DON ovr:5 cls:2 | SIL ovr:25 cls:5 | DON ovr:6 cls:1 | BRH; Ret | SIL ovr:17 cls:3 | 8th | 31 | 4th |
| 1984 | Team Sanyo Racing with Esso | Rover Vitesse | D | **DON** ovr:3 cls:3 | SIL ovr:1 cls:1 | OUL ovr:6 cls:6 | THR ovr:2 cls:2 | THR ovr:3 cls:3 | **SIL** ovr:5 cls:5 | SNE | BRH | BRH | DON | SIL | NC | 0 | NC |

=== Complete European Touring Car Championship results ===
(key) (Races in bold indicate pole position) (Races in italics indicate fastest lap)

| Year | Team | Car | 1 | 2 | 3 | 4 | 5 | 6 | 7 | 8 | 9 | 10 | 11 | 12 | DC | Pts |
|---|---|---|---|---|---|---|---|---|---|---|---|---|---|---|---|---|
| 1983 | (United Kingdom) **Unipart with Daily Express** | MG Metro Turbo | MNZ | VAL | DON | PER | MUG | BRN | ZEL | NUR | SAL | SPA | SIL; Ret | ZOL | NC | 0 |
| 1984 | (United Kingdom) **Austin Rover Group** | Rover Vitesse | MNZ | VAL | DON | PER | BRN | ZEL; Ret | SAL | NUR | SPA | SIL; NC | ZOL; 8 | MUG | NC | 0 |
