= Austin Rover World Rally Team =

Austin Rallying
- Full name: Austin Rover World Rally Team
- Base: (United Kingdom) Great Britain
- Chassis: MG Metro 6R4

World Rally Championship history
- Debut: 1985
- Manufacturers' Championships: 0
- Drivers' Championships: 0
- Rally wins: 0

The Austin Rover World Rally Team was a rally team created by Austin Rover that competed in the World Rally Championship from 1985 to 1986.

At its launch in 1985, Rover announced that it would complete the necessary number of cars required for homologation by November of that year. This was undertaken at the group's large manufacturing facility at Longbridge. The car was to participate in the Lombard RAC rally in November 1985, and an example, driven by works driver Tony Pond, finished a highly respectable third, behind two Lancia Delta S4s.

This good start was unfortunately not repeated, and although a 6R4 was entered in rallies at Monte Carlo, Sweden, Portugal and Corsica during the 1986 season, none of the Metros managed to complete a course. The majority of these problems were related to the V6 powerplant which suffered teething issues. Halfway during the 1986 season, Group B was banned (following a series of fatal crashes in which both competitors and spectators lost their lives). From that point on, the 6R4 was always going to be limited in front line competition, although they were run with limited success for the remainder of the year. A number passed into private hands and have proved formidable rally and rallycross cars. Despite the expiry of the 6R4's homologation the MSA still allow the cars to run in competition although engine sizes have been limited to 2800cc (single plenum engines) and 2500cc (multi-plenum engines).

Austin Rover withdrew from the rallying scene at the end of the season, but in 1987 all the parts and engines were sold to Tom Walkinshaw Racing, whereupon the V6 engine reappeared in the Jaguar XJ220, this time with turbochargers added.

== WRC Results (Group B era) ==
Year	Entrant	Car	Driver	1	2	3	4	5	6	7	8	9	10	11	12	13	WDC	Points	WMC	Points
1985	Austin Rallying	MG Metro 6R4	(United Kingdom) Tony Pond	MON	SWE	POR	KEN	FRA	GRC	NZL	ARG	FIN	ITA	CIV	GBR; 3		18th	12	13th	14
1985	Austin Rallying	MG Metro 6R4	(United Kingdom) Malcolm Wilson	MON	SWE	POR	KEN	FRA	GRC	NZL	ARG	FIN	ITA	CIV	GBR; Ret		-	0	13th	14
1985	R.E.D.	MG Metro 6R4	(United Kingdom) Geoff Fielding	MON	SWE	POR	KEN	FRA	GRC	NZL	ARG	FIN	ITA	CIV	GBR; Ret		-	0	13th	14
1986	Austin Rover World Rally Team	MG Metro 6R4	(United Kingdom) Tony Pond	MON; Ret	SWE	POR; Ret	KEN	FRA; Ret	GRE	NZL	ARG	FIN	CIV	ITA; Ret*	GBR; 6	USA	36th	2	9th	12
1986	Austin Rover World Rally Team	MG Metro 6R4	(United Kingdom) Malcolm Wilson	MON; Ret	SWE; Ret	POR; Ret	KEN	FRA; Ret	GRE	NZL	ARG	FIN; 10	CIV	ITA; 4*	GBR; 17	USA	70th	1	9th	12
1986	Austin Rover World Rally Team	MG Metro 6R4	(Sweden) Per Eklund	MON	SWE; Ret	POR	KEN	FRA	GRE	NZL	ARG	FIN	CIV	ITA	GBR; 7	USA	34th	8	9th	12
1986	Austin Rover World Rally Team	MG Metro 6R4	(Belgium) Marc Duez	MON	SWE	POR; Ret	KEN	FRA	GRE	NZL	ARG	FIN	CIV	ITA; Ret*	GBR; Ret	USA	-	0	9th	12
1986	Austin Rover World Rally Team	MG Metro 6R4	(France) Didier Auriol	MON	SWE	POR	KEN	FRA; Ret	GRE	NZL	ARG	FIN	CIV	ITA	GBR	USA	-	0	9th	12
1986	Austin Rover World Rally Team	MG Metro 6R4	(Finland) Harri Toivonen	MON	SWE	POR	KEN	FRA	GRE	NZL	ARG	FIN; 8	CIV	ITA	GBR; Ret	USA	49th	3	9th	12
1986	Austin Rover World Rally Team	MG Metro 6R4	(United Kingdom) Jimmy McRae	MON	SWE	POR	KEN	FRA	GRE	NZL	ARG	FIN	CIV	ITA	GBR; 8	USA	49th	3	9th	12
1986	Austin Rover World Rally Team	MG Metro 6R4	(United Kingdom) David Llewellin	MON	SWE	POR	KEN	FRA	GRE	NZL	ARG	FIN	CIV	ITA	GBR; 9	USA	60th	2	9th	12
1986	Jean-Luc Thevenod	MG Metro 6R4	(Switzerland) Jean-Luc Thevenod	MON	SWE; 16	POR	KEN	FRA	GRE	NZL	ARG	FIN	CIV	ITA	GBR	USA	-	0	9th	12
1986	Tony Teesdale	MG Metro 6R4	(New Zealand) Tony Teesdale	MON	SWE	POR	KEN	FRA	GRE	NZL; 23	ARG	FIN	CIV	ITA	GBR; Ret	USA	-	0	9th	12
1986	Clarion Team Europe	MG Metro 6R4	(Sweden) Per Eklund	MON	SWE	POR	KEN	FRA	GRE	NZL	ARG	FIN; 7	CIV	ITA	GBR	USA	34th	8	9th	12
1986	Mika Arpiainen	MG Metro 6R4	(Finland) Mika Arpiainen	MON	SWE	POR	KEN	FRA	GRE	NZL	ARG	FIN; Ret	CIV	ITA	GBR	USA	-	0	9th	12
1986	Alistair Sutherland	MG Metro 6R4	(United Kingdom) Alistair Sutherland	MON	SWE	POR	KEN	FRA	GRE	NZL	ARG	FIN	CIV	ITA	GBR; Ret	USA	-	0	9th	12
1986	Willie Rutherford	MG Metro 6R4	(United Kingdom) Willie Rutherford	MON	SWE	POR	KEN	FRA	GRE	NZL	ARG	FIN	CIV	ITA	GBR; Ret	USA	-	0	9th	12
1986	Ken Wood	MG Metro 6R4	(United Kingdom) Ken Wood	MON	SWE	POR	KEN	FRA	GRE	NZL	ARG	FIN	CIV	ITA	GBR; Ret	USA	-	0	9th	12
1986	David Gillanders	MG Metro 6R4	(United Kingdom) David Gillanders	MON	SWE	POR	KEN	FRA	GRE	NZL	ARG	FIN	CIV	ITA	GBR; Ret	USA	-	0	9th	12
1986	Geoff Fielding	MG Metro 6R4	(United Kingdom) Geoff Fielding	MON	SWE	POR	KEN	FRA	GRE	NZL	ARG	FIN	CIV	ITA	GBR; Ret	USA	-	0	9th	12

- 1986 Rallye San Remo points and results were not counted towards World Rally Championship.
