= 1981 World Rally Championship =

9th season of the World Rally Championship series

Champions
- World Drivers' Champion: Ari Vatanen
- World Manufacturers' Champion: Talbot

Seasons
- ← 1980 1982 →

The 1981 World Rally Championship was the ninth season of the Fédération Internationale de l'Automobile (FIA) World Rally Championship (WRC). The season consisted of 12 rallies. While this number was the same as the previous year, one change was made to the schedule, replacing New Zealand with the Brazil.

The 1981 World Rally Championship for Drivers was won by Ari Vatanen driving a Rothmans Rally Team Ford Escort RS1800, the only time a privateer team has won the Drivers' Championship until 2017. The Makes' Championship was won by Talbot with their Sunbeam Lotus. It also saw the beginning of a new era in the sport with the arrival of the Audi Quattro, the first four-wheel drive rally car. Initially regarded as too heavy and complex for rally stages, it proved its worth with three wins in its debut season, including a maiden victory for Michèle Mouton at the Rallye Sanremo, the only woman to win a WRC event.

Eventual champion Ari Vatanen in a Ford Escort RS1800 at the 1981 San Remo Rally.

== Calendar ==
Rd.	Start date	Finish date	Rally	Rally headquarters	Surface	Stages	Distance	Points
1	24 January	30 January	(Monaco) 49th Rallye Automobile Monte-Carlo	Monte Carlo	Mixed	32	750 km	Drivers & Manufacturers
2	13 February	15 February	(Sweden) 31st International Swedish Rally	Karlstad, Värmland County	Snow	25	369 km	Drivers only
3	4 March	7 March	15th Rallye de Portugal - Vinho do Porto	Estoril, Lisbon	Mixed	46	678 km	Drivers & Manufacturers
4	16 April	20 April	(Kenya) 29th Marlboro Safari Rally	Nairobi	Gravel	N/A	4750 km	Drivers & Manufacturers
5	30 April	2 May	25th Tour de Corse - Rallye de France	Ajaccio, Corsica	Tarmac	24	1144.6 km	Drivers & Manufacturers
6	1 June	4 June	(Greece) 28th Acropolis Rally	Athens	Gravel	57	995.59 km	Drivers & Manufacturers
7	18 July	23 July	(Argentina) 3rd Rally Codasur	Tucumán	Gravel	17	1346.6 km	Drivers & Manufacturers
8	6 August	8 August	(Brazil) 3rd Marlboro Rallye do Brasil	São Paulo	Gravel	21	714 km	Drivers only
9	28 August	30 August	(Finland) 31st Jyväskylän Suurajot - Rally of the 1000 Lakes	Jyväskylä, Central Finland	Gravel	48	453.09 km	Drivers & Manufacturers
10	5 October	10 October	(Italy) 23rd Rallye Sanremo	Sanremo, Liguria	Mixed	61	751.06 km	Drivers & Manufacturers
11	26 October	30 October	(Ivory Coast) 13th Rallye Cote d'Ivoire	Abidjan	Gravel	N/A	5087 km	Drivers & Manufacturers
12	22 November	24 November	(United Kingdom) 37th Lombard RAC Rally	Chester, Cheshire	Gravel	65	746.74 km	Drivers & Manufacturers

== Teams and drivers ==
Team	Constructor	Car	Drivers	Rounds
(United Kingdom) David Sutton Motorsport	Ford	Escort RS 1800	(Sweden) Björn Waldegård	1
(United Kingdom) David Sutton Motorsport	Ford	Escort RS 1800	(Monaco) Raymond Rué	1, 3
(United Kingdom) David Sutton Motorsport	Ford	Escort RS 1800	(Finland) Lasse Lampi	2, 9, 12
(United Kingdom) David Sutton Motorsport	Ford	Escort RS 1800	(Sweden) Bror Danielsson	2
(United Kingdom) David Sutton Motorsport	Ford	Escort RS 1800	(France) Yves Loubet	5
(United Kingdom) David Sutton Motorsport	Ford	Escort RS 1800	(Uruguay) Domingo De Vitta	7–8
(United Kingdom) David Sutton Motorsport	Ford	Escort RS 1800	(United Kingdom) Roger Clark	12
(Italy) Fiat Auto Torino	Fiat	131 Abarth	(Finland) Markku Alén	1, 3, 6, 9–10
(Italy) Fiat Auto Torino	Fiat	131 Abarth	(Italy) Attilio Bettega	1, 3, 6, 10
(Italy) Fiat Auto Torino	Fiat	131 Abarth	(Italy) Dario Cerrato	1, 3, 10
(Italy) Fiat Auto Torino	Fiat	131 Abarth	(Kenya) Rob Collinge	4
(Italy) Fiat Auto Torino	Fiat	131 Abarth	(Finland) Kalevi Aho	9
(United Kingdom) Rothmans Rally Team	Ford	Escort RS 1800	(Finland) Ari Vatanen	1–3, 6–12
(United Kingdom) Rothmans Rally Team	Ford	Escort RS 1800	(Finland) Pentti Airikkala	2, 9, 12
(United Kingdom) Rothmans Rally Team	Ford	Escort RS 1800	(United Kingdom) Malcolm Wilson	3, 6, 12
(United Kingdom) Rothmans Rally Team	Ford	Escort RS 1800	(United Kingdom) John Taylor	11
(France) Team Chardonnet	Lancia	Stratos HF	(France) Bernard Darniche	1, 5
(France) Team Chardonnet	Lancia	Stratos HF	(Finland) Markku Alén	12
(Germany) Audi Sport	Audi	Quattro	(Finland) Hannu Mikkola	1–3, 5–6, 9–10, 12
(Germany) Audi Sport	Audi	Quattro	(France) Michèle Mouton	1, 3, 5–6, 9–10, 12
(Germany) Audi Sport	Audi	Quattro	(Austria) Franz Wittmann	6, 9
(Germany) Audi Sport	Audi	Quattro	(Italy) Michele Cinotto	10
(Germany) Audi Sport	Audi	Quattro	(France) Adolphe Choteau	11
(Germany) Opel Euro Händler Team	Opel	Opel Ascona 400	(Germany) Jochi Kleint	1, 4, 6
(Germany) Opel Euro Händler Team	Opel	Opel Ascona 400	(Sweden) Anders Kulläng	1–4
(Germany) Opel Euro Händler Team	Opel	Opel Ascona 400	(Sweden) Björn Johansson	2, 9, 12
(Germany) Opel Euro Händler Team	Opel	Opel Ascona 400	(United Kingdom) Jimmy McRae	12
(Germany) Opel Euro Händler Team	Opel	Opel Ascona 400	(United Kingdom) Malcolm Patrick	12
(United Kingdom) Talbot Sport	Talbot	Sunbeam Lotus	(Finland) Henri Toivonen	1, 3, 5–6, 9–10, 12
(United Kingdom) Talbot Sport	Talbot	Sunbeam Lotus	(France) Guy Fréquelin	1, 3, 5–8, 10, 12
(United Kingdom) Talbot Sport	Talbot	Sunbeam Lotus	(Sweden) Gunnar Fagerlind	2, 12
(United Kingdom) Talbot Sport	Talbot	Sunbeam Lotus	(Sweden) Stig Blomqvist	9, 12
(United Kingdom) Talbot Sport	Talbot	Sunbeam Lotus	(United Kingdom) Russell Brookes	12
(France) Renault Elf	Renault	Renault 5 Turbo	(France) Jean Ragnotti	1, 5, 12
(France) Renault Elf	Renault	Renault 5 Turbo	(France) Bruno Saby	1, 5, 12
(France) Renault Elf	Renault	Renault 5 Turbo	(France) Alain Coppier	1, 5
(France) Renault Elf	Renault	Renault 5 Turbo	(France) Pierre-Louis Moreau	5
(France) Renault Elf	Renault	Renault 5 Turbo	(France) Jean-Pierre Manzagol	5
(France) Porsche Alméras	Porsche	Porsche 911 SC	(France) Jean-Luc Thérier	1, 3, 5, 10
(France) Porsche Alméras	Porsche	Porsche 911 SC	(France) Jacques Alméras	1, 5
(France) Porsche Alméras	Porsche	Porsche 911 SC	(Sweden) Per Eklund	2, 9
(France) Porsche Alméras	Porsche	Porsche 911 SC	(France) Francis Vincent	5
(France) Porsche Alméras	Porsche	Porsche 911 SC	(Germany) Walter Röhrl	10
(Japan) Team Datsun Europe	Datsun	160J; Violet GT	(Finland) Rauno Aaltonen	1, 4
(Japan) Team Datsun Europe	Datsun	160J; Violet GT	(Sweden) Sören Nilsson	2, 12
(Japan) Team Datsun Europe	Datsun	160J; Violet GT	(Finland) Timo Salonen	3–7, 9–12
(Japan) Team Datsun Europe	Datsun	160J; Violet GT	(United Kingdom) Tony Pond	3, 5, 10
(Japan) Team Datsun Europe	Datsun	160J; Violet GT	(Portugal) Santinho Mendes	3
(Japan) Team Datsun Europe	Datsun	160J; Violet GT	(Kenya) Shekhar Mehta	4, 6–8, 11
(Japan) Team Datsun Europe	Datsun	160J; Violet GT	(Kenya) John Hellier	4
(Japan) Team Datsun Europe	Datsun	160J; Violet GT	(Kenya) Mike Kirkland	4
(Japan) Team Datsun Europe	Datsun	160J; Violet GT	(United Kingdom) Terry Kaby	5
(Japan) Team Datsun Europe	Datsun	160J; Violet GT	(Greece) George Moschous	6
(Japan) Team Datsun Europe	Datsun	160J; Violet GT	(Argentina) Ricardo Zunino	7
(Japan) Team Datsun Europe	Datsun	160J; Violet GT	(Argentina) Jorge Recalde	7–8
(Japan) Team Datsun Europe	Datsun	160J; Violet GT	(Finland) Erkki Pitkänen	9
(Japan) Team Datsun Europe	Datsun	160J; Violet GT	(Finland) Peter Geitel	9
(Japan) Team Datsun Europe	Datsun	160J; Violet GT	(France) Michel Mitri	11
(Japan) Team Datsun Europe	Datsun	160J; Violet GT	(France) Pierre-Louis Moreau	11
(Japan) Team Datsun Europe	Datsun	160J; Violet GT	(United Kingdom) Andy Dawson	12
(Japan) Toyota Team Europe	Toyota	Celica 2000GT	(Sweden) Björn Waldegård	3, 5–6, 9, 11–12
(Japan) Toyota Team Europe	Toyota	Celica 2000GT	(Sweden) Per Eklund	3, 5–6, 11–12
(Japan) Toyota Team Europe	Toyota	Celica 2000GT	(Germany) Achim Warmbold	3
(Japan) Toyota Team Europe	Toyota	Celica 2000GT	(Finland) Tapio Rainio	9
(Japan) Toyota Team Europe	Toyota	Celica 2000GT	(Lebanon) Samir Assef	11
(Japan) Toyota Team Europe	Toyota	Celica 2000GT	(United Kingdom) Terry Kaby	12
(France) Peugeot Esso	Peugeot	504 Coupé V6	(France) Alain Ambrosino	4, 11
(France) Peugeot Esso	Peugeot	504 Coupé V6	(France) Guy Fréquelin	4, 11
(France) Peugeot Esso	Peugeot	504 Coupé V6	(Finland) Timo Mäkinen	4
(France) Peugeot Esso	Peugeot	504 Coupé V6	(France) Jean-Claude Lefèbvre	4
(France) Peugeot Esso	Peugeot	504 Coupé V6	(Argentina) Carlos Garro	7
(France) Peugeot Esso	Peugeot	504 Coupé V6	(Argentina) Francisco Alcuaz	7
(France) Peugeot Esso	Peugeot	504 Coupé V6	(Ivory Coast) Jacques Durieu	11
(France) Charles Pozzi	Ferrari	308 GTB	(France) Jean-Claude Andruet	5
(Japan) Team Ralliart	Mitsubishi	Lancer 2000 Turbo	(Sweden) Anders Kulläng	6, 9, 12
(Japan) Team Ralliart	Mitsubishi	Lancer 2000 Turbo	(United Kingdom) Andrew Cowan	6, 12
(Japan) Team Ralliart	Mitsubishi	Lancer 2000 Turbo	(Austria) Georg Fischer	6
(Japan) Team Ralliart	Mitsubishi	Lancer 2000 Turbo	(Finland) Kyösti Hämäläinen	9
(Japan) Team Ralliart	Mitsubishi	Lancer 2000 Turbo	(Finland) Antero Laine	9, 12
(Italy) Jolly Club	Fiat	131 Abarth	(Italy) Adartico Vudafieri	11
(Germany) Mercedes Kassel	Mercedes	500 SL	(Germany) Holger Bohne	11
(United Kingdom) Dealer Team Vauxhall	Vauxhall	Chevette 2300 HSR	(United Kingdom) Tony Pond	12
(United Kingdom) Dealer Team Vauxhall	Vauxhall	Chevette 2300 HSR	(United Kingdom) George Hill	12

== Championships ==
1981 World Rally Championship for Manufacturers
Rank	Manufacturers	Event												Total points
Rank	Manufacturers	(Monaco) MON	(Sweden) SWE	(Portugal) POR	(Kenya) KEN	(France) FRA	(Greece) GRC	(Argentina) ARG	(Brazil) BRA	(Finland) FIN	(Italy) ITA	(Ivory Coast) CIV	(United Kingdom) GBR	Total points
1	(United Kingdom) Talbot	17	-	17	-	17	15	18	-	-	17	-	16	117
2	(Japan) Datsun	-	-	13	18	15	13	17	-	12	-	18	-	106
3	(United States) Ford	-	-	9	-	12	18	-	-	18	7	-	16	80
4	(West Germany) Opel	15	-	11	12	8	-	-	-	8	15	-	-	69
5	(West Germany) Audi	-	-	13	-	-	-	-	-	14	18	-	18	63
6	(Italy) Fiat	8	-	18	-	-	16	-	-	16	5	-	-	63
7	(France) Renault	18	-	-	-	7	10	15	-	-	-	-	11	61
8	(Japan) Toyota	-	-	15	-	11	-	-	-	3	-	16	9	54
9	(France) Peugeot	-	-	-	10	-	4	12	-	-	-	11	-	37
10	(Italy) Lancia	10	-	-	-	18	-	-	-	-	-	-	-	28
11	(West Germany) Porsche	4	-	-	-	15	-	-	-	-	-	-	-	19
12	(Czechoslovakia) Škoda	-	-	-	-	-	8	-	-	-	-	-	-	8
13	(United States) Dodge	-	-	-	6	-	-	-	-	-	-	-	-	6
14	(Japan) Mitsubishi	-	-	-	-	-	-	-	-	1	-	-	3	4

1981 World Rally Championship point awards for manufacturers
Overall finish	Group finish									
Overall finish	1	2	3	4	5	6	7	8	9	10
1	18	-	-	-	-	-	-	-	-	-
2	17	16	-	-	-	-	-	-	-	-
3	16	15	14	-	-	-	-	-	-	-
4	15	14	13	12	-	-	-	-	-	-
5	14	13	12	11	10	-	-	-	-	-
6	13	12	11	10	9	8	-	-	-	-
7	12	11	10	9	8	7	6	-	-	-
8	11	10	9	8	7	6	5	4	-	-
9	10	9	8	7	6	5	4	3	2	-
10	9	8	7	6	5	4	3	2	1	1

1981 World Rally Championship for Drivers
Rank	Driver	Event												Total points
Rank	Driver	(Monaco) MON	(Sweden) SWE	(Portugal) POR	(Kenya) KEN	(France) FRA	(Greece) GRC	(Argentina) ARG	(Brazil) BRA	(Finland) FIN	(Italy) ITA	(Ivory Coast) CIV	(United Kingdom) GBR	Total points
1	(Finland) Ari Vatanen	0	15	0	-	-	20	0	20	20	4	2	15	96
2	(France) Guy Fréquelin	15	-	6	0	15	10	20	15	-	0	8	0	89
3	(Finland) Hannu Mikkola	0	20	0	-	0	0	-	-	12	10	-	20	62
4	(Finland) Markku Alén	4	-	20	-	-	15	-	-	15	2	-	0	56
5	(Kenya) Shekhar Mehta	-	-	-	20	-	8	15	0	-	-	12	-	55
6	(Finland) Timo Salonen	-	-	0	10	0	0	0	-	10	0	20	0	40
7	(Finland) Henri Toivonen	8	-	15	-	0	0	-	-	0	15	-	0	38
8	(France) Michèle Mouton	0	-	10	-	0	0	-	-	0	20	-	0	30
9	(Finland) Pentti Airikkala	-	12	-	-	-	-	-	-	8	-	-	10	30
10	(Sweden) Per Eklund	0	2	0	-	6	0	-	-	0	-	15	6	29
11	(France) Jean Ragnotti	20	-	-	-	0	-	-	-	-	-	-	8	28
12	(France) Bernard Darniche	6	-	-	-	20	-	-	-	-	-	-	-	26
13	(Sweden) Stig Blomqvist	-	8	-	-	-	-	-	-	3	-	-	12	23
14	(Argentina) Jorge Recalde	-	-	-	-	-	-	12	10	-	-	-	-	22
15	(Sweden) Anders Kulläng	10	10	0	0	-	0	-	-	0	-	-	2	22
16	(West Germany) Jochi Kleint	12	-	-	8	-	0	-	-	-	-	-	-	20
16	(United Kingdom) Tony Pond	-	-	8	-	12	-	-	-	-	0	-	0	20
18	(Sweden) Björn Waldegård	3	-	12	-	0	0	-	-	2	-	0	0	17
19	(Finland) Rauno Aaltonen	0	-	-	15	-	-	-	-	-	-	-	-	15
20	(Kenya) Mike Kirkland	-	-	-	12	-	-	-	-	-	-	-	-	12
20	(Italy) Attilio Bettega	0	-	0	-	-	12	-	-	-	0	-	-	12
20	(Uruguay) Domingo De Vitta	-	-	-	-	-	-	0	12	-	-	-	-	12
20	(Italy) Antonio Fassina	-	-	-	-	-	-	-	-	-	12	-	-	12
24	(Sweden) Björn Johansson	-	6	-	-	-	-	-	-	6	-	-	0	12
25	(United Kingdom) Terry Kaby	-	-	-	-	8	-	-	-	-	-	-	3	11
26	(France) Jean-Pierre Ballet	0	-	-	-	10	-	-	-	-	-	-	-	10
26	(Argentina) Ernesto Soto	-	-	-	-	-	-	10	-	-	-	-	-	10
26	(France) Michel Mitri	-	-	-	-	-	-	-	-	-	-	10	-	10
29	(Argentina) Ricardo Albertengo	-	-	-	-	-	-	8	-	-	-	-	-	10
29	(Portugal) Carlos Torres	-	-	0	-	-	-	-	8	-	-	-	-	8
29	(Italy) Luigi Battistolli	-	-	-	-	-	-	-	-	-	8	-	-	8
32	(Finland) Lasse Lampi	-	4	-	-	-	-	-	-	4	-	-	0	8
33	(France) Jean-Claude Lefèbvre	-	-	-	6	-	-	-	-	-	-	-	-	6
33	(Greece) Iórgos Moschous	-	-	-	-	-	6	-	-	-	-	-	-	6
33	(Uruguay) Luis Etchegoyen	-	-	-	-	-	-	6	-	-	-	-	-	6
33	(Uruguay) Gustavo Trelles	-	-	-	-	-	-	-	6	-	-	-	-	6
33	(Italy) Miki Biasion	-	-	-	-	-	-	-	-	-	6	-	-	6
33	(France) Alain Ambrosino	-	-	-	0	-	-	-	-	-	-	6	-	6
39	(Sweden) Sören Nilsson	-	-	-	-	-	-	1	4	-	-	-	-	5
39	(Argentina) Horacio Maglione	-	1	-	-	-	-	-	-	-	-	-	4	5
41	(Spain) Rafael 'Cid'	-	-	4	-	-	-	-	-	-	-	-	-	4
41	(Japan) Yoshio Iwashita	-	-	-	4	-	-	-	-	-	-	-	-	4
41	(Italy) Jean-Michel Tichadou	-	-	-	-	4	-	-	-	-	-	-	-	4
41	(Greece) 'Carlo'	-	-	-	-	-	4	-	-	-	-	-	-	4
41	(Uruguay) Federico West	-	-	-	-	-	-	4	-	-	-	-	-	4
41	(Lebanon) Samir Assef	-	-	-	-	-	-	-	-	-	-	4	-	4
47	(Sweden) Ola Strömberg	-	3	-	-	-	-	-	-	-	-	-	-	3
47	(Portugal) Manuel Queirós Pereira	-	-	3	-	-	-	-	-	-	-	-	-	3
47	(Kenya) Jayant Shah	-	-	-	3	-	-	-	-	-	-	-	-	3
47	(France) Gérard Swaton	-	-	-	-	3	-	-	-	-	-	-	-	3
47	(Czechoslovakia) Václav Blahna	-	-	-	-	-	3	-	-	-	-	-	-	3
47	(Argentina) Luís Romero	-	-	-	-	-	-	3	-	-	-	-	-	3
47	(Uruguay) Julio Berges	-	-	-	-	-	-	-	3	-	-	-	-	3
47	(Italy) Dario Cerrato	0	-	0	-	-	-	-	-	-	3	-	-	3
47	(Ivory Coast) Jacques Durieu	-	-	-	-	-	-	-	-	-	-	3	-	3
56	(France) Jacques Alméras	2	-	-	-	0	-	-	-	-	-	-	-	2
56	(Portugal) Joaquim Moutinho	-	-	2	-	-	-	-	-	-	-	-	-	2
56	(United States) Malcolm Smith	-	-	-	2	-	-	-	-	-	-	-	-	2
56	(France) Camille Bartoli	-	-	-	-	2	-	-	-	-	-	-	-	2
56	(Greece) Pavlos Moschoutis	-	-	-	-	-	2	-	-	-	-	-	-	2
56	(Argentina) Miguel Tubal	-	-	-	-	-	-	2	-	-	-	-	-	2
56	(Brazil) Maria Carmo Zacarias	-	-	-	-	-	-	-	2	-	-	-	-	2
63	(France) Alain Coppier	1	-	-	-	0	-	-	-	-	-	-	-	1
63	(Japan) Kenjiro Shinozuka	-	-	1	-	-	-	-	-	-	-	-	-	1
63	(United States) Rod Hall	-	-	-	1	-	-	-	-	-	-	-	-	1
63	(France) Jean-Felix Farrucci	-	-	-	-	1	-	-	-	-	-	-	-	1
63	(France) Claude Laurent	0	-	-	-	-	1	-	-	0	-	0	0	1
63	(Finland) Antero Laine	-	-	-	-	-	-	-	-	1	0	-	0	1
63	(Italy) Federico Ormezzano	-	-	-	-	-	-	-	-	-	1	-	-	1
63	(United Kingdom) Roger Clark	-	-	-	-	-	-	-	-	-	-	-	1	1

1981 World Rally Championship point awards for drivers
Points awarded by finish	1st	2nd	3rd	4th	5th	6th	7th	8th	9th	10th
Points awarded by finish	20	15	12	10	8	6	4	3	2	1

== Events ==
1981 World Rally Championship event map
Black = Tarmac	Brown = Gravel	Blue = Snow/Ice	Red = Mixed Surface

1981 World Rally Championship schedule and results
Round	Rally name	Stages	Podium finishers				
Round	Rally name	Stages	Rank	Driver	Co-driver	Car	Time
1	(Monaco) Rallye Monte Carlo (24–30 January)	32 stages 757 km Tarmac	1	(France) Jean Ragnotti	(France) Jean-Marc Andrié	Renault 5 Turbo	9:55:55
1	(Monaco) Rallye Monte Carlo (24–30 January)	32 stages 757 km Tarmac	2	(France) Guy Fréquelin	(France) Jean Todt	Talbot Sunbeam Lotus	9:58:49
1	(Monaco) Rallye Monte Carlo (24–30 January)	32 stages 757 km Tarmac	3	(West Germany) Jochi Kleint	(West Germany) Gunter Wanger	Opel Ascona 400	10:02:54
2	(Sweden) Swedish Rally (13–15 February)	25 stages 369 km Snow/Ice	1	(Finland) Hannu Mikkola	(Sweden) Arne Hertz	Audi Quattro	3:48:07
2	(Sweden) Swedish Rally (13–15 February)	25 stages 369 km Snow/Ice	2	(Finland) Ari Vatanen	(United Kingdom) David Richards	Ford Escort RS1800	3:50:00
2	(Sweden) Swedish Rally (13–15 February)	25 stages 369 km Snow/Ice	3	(Finland) Pentti Airikkala	(Finland) Risto Virtanen	Ford Escort RS1800	3:51:47
3	Rallye de Portugal (4–7 March)	46 stages 681 km Gravel/Tarmac	1	(Finland) Markku Alén	(Finland) Ilkka Kivimäki	Fiat 131 Abarth	8:27:26
3	Rallye de Portugal (4–7 March)	46 stages 681 km Gravel/Tarmac	2	(Finland) Henri Toivonen	(United Kingdom) Fred Gallagher	Talbot Sunbeam Lotus	8:36:36
3	Rallye de Portugal (4–7 March)	46 stages 681 km Gravel/Tarmac	3	(Sweden) Björn Waldegård	(Sweden) Hans Thorszelius	Toyota Celica 2000GT	8:43:47
4	(Kenya) Safari Rally (16–20 April)	77 controls 5209 km Gravel	1	(Kenya) Shekhar Mehta	(Kenya) Mike Doughty	Datsun Violet GT	+3:39 pen
4	(Kenya) Safari Rally (16–20 April)	77 controls 5209 km Gravel	2	(Finland) Rauno Aaltonen	(Kenya) Lofty Drews	Datsun Violet GT	+3:44 pen
4	(Kenya) Safari Rally (16–20 April)	77 controls 5209 km Gravel	3	(Kenya) Mike Kirkland	(Kenya) Dave Haworth	Datsun 160J	+4:51 pen
5	(France) Tour de Corse (30 April–2 May)	24 stages 1144 km Tarmac	1	(France) Bernard Darniche	(France) Alain Mahé	Lancia Stratos HF	14:26.23
5	(France) Tour de Corse (30 April–2 May)	24 stages 1144 km Tarmac	2	(France) Guy Fréquelin	(France) Jean Todt	Talbot Sunbeam Lotus	14:42:25
5	(France) Tour de Corse (30 April–2 May)	24 stages 1144 km Tarmac	3	(United Kingdom) Tony Pond	(United Kingdom) Ian Grindrod	Datsun Violet GT	14:45.29
6	(Greece) Acropolis Rally (1–4 June)	57 stages 960 km Gravel	1	(Finland) Ari Vatanen	(United Kingdom) David Richards	Ford Escort RS1800	13:17:25
6	(Greece) Acropolis Rally (1–4 June)	57 stages 960 km Gravel	2	(Finland) Markku Alén	(Finland) Ilkka Kivimäki	Fiat 131 Abarth	13:22:00
6	(Greece) Acropolis Rally (1–4 June)	57 stages 960 km Gravel	3	(Italy) Attilio Bettega	(Italy) Maurizio Perissinot	Fiat 131 Abarth	13:25:19
7	(Argentina) Rally Codasur (18–23 July)	18 stages 1341 km Gravel	1	(France) Guy Fréquelin	(France) Jean Todt	Talbot Sunbeam Lotus	14:22:52
7	(Argentina) Rally Codasur (18–23 July)	18 stages 1341 km Gravel	2	(Kenya) Shekhar Mehta	(Kenya) Mike Doughty	Datsun Violet GT	15:01:04
7	(Argentina) Rally Codasur (18–23 July)	18 stages 1341 km Gravel	3	(Argentina) Jorge Recalde	(Argentina) Jorge del Bouno	Datsun 160J	16:01:19
8	(Brazil) Rallye do Brasil (6–8 August)	20 stages 714 km Gravel	1	(Finland) Ari Vatanen	(United Kingdom) David Richards	Ford Escort RS1800	9:39:40
8	(Brazil) Rallye do Brasil (6–8 August)	20 stages 714 km Gravel	2	(France) Guy Fréquelin	(France) Jean Todt	Talbot Sunbeam Lotus	9:48:11
8	(Brazil) Rallye do Brasil (6–8 August)	20 stages 714 km Gravel	3	(Uruguay) Domingo De Vitta	(Uruguay) Daniel Muzio	Ford Escort RS	10:19:46
9	(Finland) 1000 Lakes Rally (28–30 August)	46 stages 440 km Gravel	1	(Finland) Ari Vatanen	(United Kingdom) David Richards	Ford Escort RS1800	4:07:27
9	(Finland) 1000 Lakes Rally (28–30 August)	46 stages 440 km Gravel	2	(Finland) Markku Alén	(Finland) Ilkka Kivimäki	Fiat 131 Abarth	4:08:26
9	(Finland) 1000 Lakes Rally (28–30 August)	46 stages 440 km Gravel	3	(Finland) Hannu Mikkola	(Sweden) Arne Hertz	Audi Quattro	4:10:19
10	(Italy) Rallye Sanremo (5–10 October)	59 stages 751 km Gravel/Tarmac	1	(France) Michèle Mouton	(Italy) Fabrizia Pons	Audi Quattro	8:05:50
10	(Italy) Rallye Sanremo (5–10 October)	59 stages 751 km Gravel/Tarmac	2	(Finland) Henri Toivonen	(United Kingdom) Fred Gallagher	Talbot Sunbeam Lotus	8:09:15
10	(Italy) Rallye Sanremo (5–10 October)	59 stages 751 km Gravel/Tarmac	3	(Italy) Antonio Fassina	(Italy) Rudy Roberto Dalpozzo	Opel Ascona 400	8:12:08
11	(Ivory Coast) Rallye Côte d'Ivoire (26–31 October)	56 controls 5087 km Gravel	1	(Finland) Timo Salonen	(Finland) Seppo Harjanne	Datsun Violet GT	+9:57 pen
11	(Ivory Coast) Rallye Côte d'Ivoire (26–31 October)	56 controls 5087 km Gravel	2	(Sweden) Per Eklund	(Sweden) Ragnar Spjuth	Toyota Celica 2000GT	+11:09 pen
11	(Ivory Coast) Rallye Côte d'Ivoire (26–31 October)	56 controls 5087 km Gravel	3	(Kenya) Shekhar Mehta	(Kenya) Mike Doughty	Datsun Violet GT	+11:22 pen
12	(United Kingdom) RAC Rally (22–25 November)	65 stages 722 km Gravel/Tarmac	1	(Finland) Hannu Mikkola	(Sweden) Arne Hertz	Audi Quattro	8:30:00
12	(United Kingdom) RAC Rally (22–25 November)	65 stages 722 km Gravel/Tarmac	2	(Finland) Ari Vatanen	(United Kingdom) David Richards	Ford Escort RS1800	8:41:05
12	(United Kingdom) RAC Rally (22–25 November)	65 stages 722 km Gravel/Tarmac	3	(Sweden) Stig Blomqvist	(Sweden) Björn Cederberg	Talbot Sunbeam Lotus	8:43:36

== See also ==
- 1981 in sports
