= 1985 World Rally Championship =

13th season of the FIA World Rally Championship

Champions
- World Drivers' Champion: Timo Salonen
- World Manufacturers' Champion: Peugeot

Seasons
- ← 1984 1986 →

The 1985 World Rally Championship was the 13th season of the Fédération Internationale de l'Automobile (FIA) World Rally Championship (WRC). The season consisted of 12 rallies following the same schedule as the previous season. Peugeot Sport's Timo Salonen beat Audi Sport's Stig Blomqvist and Walter Röhrl to the drivers' title. Peugeot won their first manufacturers' title, ahead of Audi and Lancia.

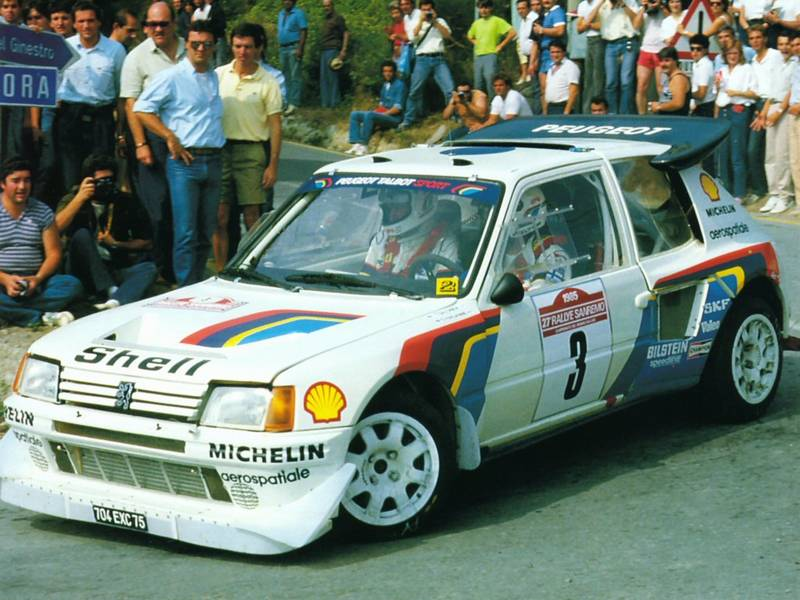
Eventual champion Timo Salonen driving a Peugeot 205 Turbo 16 E2 at the 1985 Rallye Sanremo.

== Summary ==
Peugeot Talbot Sport, having made a successful late-season entry to Group B with their new Peugeot 205 Turbo 16 car, returned in 1985 for a full season with the car. Ari Vatanen, who had won three of the last four rallies of 1984 in the car, also returned with the team and in the first rally of the season, passed Walter Röhrl's Quattro in the snowy and icy terrain after incurring an eight-minute penalty caused by co-driver Terry Harryman's error. At the Swedish Rally, Vatanen won again, establishing himself as the early favorite for a driver's title, as well as putting Peugeot ahead of Audi.

A disaster struck in May at the Tour de Corse. On the 4th stage of the rally, Italian driver Attilio Bettega crashed his Lancia 037 into a tree and was killed instantly. His co-driver Maurizio Perissinot survived the crash uninjured. The crash raised questions about the safety aspects of Group B cars. Exactly one year later at the same event Henri Toivonen suffered a similar fatal accident forcing FIA to ban Group B.

Unfortunately, Vatanen had a major accident in Argentina while speeding down a long, straight road in top gear when his car crashed and rolled end-over-front. The flimsy exterior of the car shattered, but the strong rollcage absorbed most of the impact. The drivers were airlifted to hospital by Peugeot's helicopter, and Vatanen's injuries were severe and seemed life-threatening. Although he would recover and return to the sport, the Peugeot team was forced to turn to its other driver, Timo Salonen. Salonen had already taken the points lead and finished with the driver's championship on the strength of five rally wins.

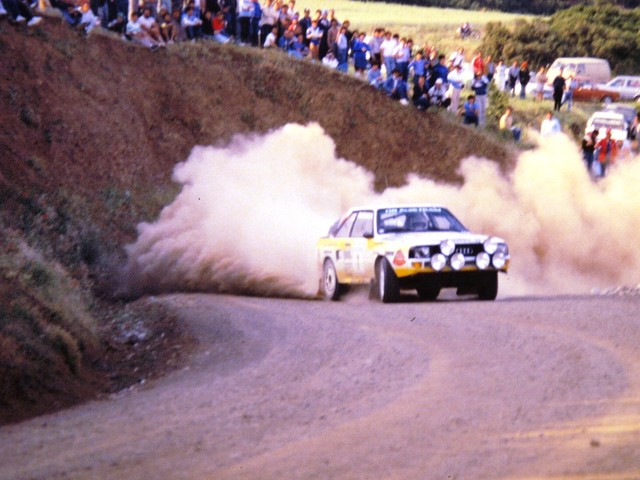
Audi Sport Quattro driven in 1985

Audi Sport faced the dual pressure of Peugeot's strong 205 car in competition, and waning company commitment to the Quattro rally program. With the danger of the Group B rally becoming a more publicized issue, the company was questioning its involvement in the sport unless major changes were made to improve safety. While both Stig Blomqvist and Walter Röhrl were retained as drivers, they suffered generally at the hands of the Peugeot team although they would ultimately place second and third respectively. Their season however only included a single rally win between them, with Röhrl's triumph at Sanremo proving to be Audi's last Group B victory in the World Rally Championship.

The Lancia Martini team's season was an even greater disappointment than Audi's. The rear-wheel drive Lancia Sport 037 met with little success, even in the hands of such drivers as Markku Alén, Massimo Biasion, and Henri Toivonen. Toivonen would suffer an accident, breaking three vertebrae in his neck early on and missing most of the season. The team awaited the arrival of the Delta S4, a four-wheel-drive car, hoping it would give them a competitive advantage. Arriving for the final rally of the season, the RAC Rally, it succeeded in collecting the victory and giving the team hope for competing in the following season.

Austin Rallying made its entrance to the rally scene with the new MG Metro 6R4 and its 3.0L V6 engine, taking a podium position at the RAC. Austin's success would be brief, however, as the Metro would struggle in the final season of Group B competition in 1986. As with previous seasons, while all 12 events were calculated for tallying the drivers' scores, only 11 of the events applied to the championship for manufacturers. The event in 1985 which applied only to driver standings was Rallye Côte d'Ivoire.

== Calendar ==
Rd.	Start date	Finish date	Rally	Rally headquarters	Surface	Stages	Distance	Points
1	26 January	1 February	(Monaco) 53rd Rallye Automobile Monte-Carlo	Monte Carlo	Mixed	34	851.10 km	Drivers & Manufacturers
2	15 February	17 February	(Sweden) 35th International Swedish Rally	Karlstad, Värmland County	Snow	29	513.68 km	Drivers & Manufacturers
3	6 March	9 March	19th Rallye de Portugal - Vinho do Porto	Estoril, Lisbon	Mixed	47	730.50 km	Drivers & Manufacturers
4	4 April	8 April	(Kenya) 33rd Marlboro Safari Rally	Nairobi	Gravel	N/A	5167 km	Drivers & Manufacturers
5	2 May	4 May	29th Tour de Corse - Rallye de France	Ajaccio, Corsica	Tarmac	30	1122.25 km	Drivers & Manufacturers
6	27 May	30 May	(Greece) 32nd Rothmans Acropolis Rally	Athens	Gravel	47	807.67 km	Drivers & Manufacturers
7	29 June	2 July	16th AWA Clarion Rally of New Zealand	Auckland	Gravel	48	935.50 km	Drivers & Manufacturers
8	30 July	3 August	5th Rally of Argentina	Buenos Aires	Gravel	23	956.71 km	Drivers & Manufacturers
9	23 August	25 August	(Finland) 35th Rally of the 1000 Lakes	Jyväskylä, Central Finland	Gravel	51	458.01 km	Drivers & Manufacturers
10	29 September	4 October	(Italy) 27th Rallye Sanremo	Sanremo, Liguria	Mixed	45	696.90 km	Drivers & Manufacturers
11	30 October	3 November	(Ivory Coast) 17th Rallye Cote d'Ivoire	Yamoussoukro	Gravel	N/A	4103 km	Drivers only
12	24 November	28 November	(United Kingdom) 41st Lombard RAC Rally	Nottingham	Gravel	65	896.98 km	Drivers & Manufacturers

== Teams and drivers ==
Team	Manufacturer	Car	Tyre	Drivers	Rounds
(Germany) Audi Sport	Audi	Quattro Sport	M	(Sweden) Stig Blomqvist	1–4, 6–9
(Germany) Audi Sport	Audi	Quattro Sport	M	(Germany) Walter Röhrl	1–3, 5–7, 10, 12
(Germany) Audi Sport	Audi	Quattro Sport	M	(Finland) Hannu Mikkola	2, 4, 9, 12
(Germany) Audi Sport	Audi	Quattro Sport	M	(Sweden) Per Eklund	2, 9, 12
(Germany) Audi Sport	Audi	Quattro Sport	M	(Finland) Lasse Lampi	2, 9
(Germany) Audi Sport	Audi	Quattro Sport	M	(United Kingdom) Malcolm Wilson	2
(Germany) Audi Sport	Audi	Quattro Sport	M	(United Kingdom) David Llewellin	2
(Germany) Audi Sport	Audi	Quattro Sport	M	(New Zealand) Malcolm Stewart	7
(Germany) Audi Sport	Audi	Quattro Sport	M	(Austria) Wilfred Wiedner	8
(Germany) Audi Sport	Audi	Quattro Sport	M	(France) Michèle Mouton	11
(Germany) Audi Sport	Audi	Quattro Sport	M	(Germany) Franz Braun	11
(France) Peugeot Talbot Sport	Peugeot	205 Turbo 16; 205 Turbo 16 E2	M	(Finland) Ari Vatanen	1–8
(France) Peugeot Talbot Sport	Peugeot	205 Turbo 16; 205 Turbo 16 E2	M	(Finland) Timo Salonen	1–10, 12
(France) Peugeot Talbot Sport	Peugeot	205 Turbo 16; 205 Turbo 16 E2	M	(France) Bruno Saby	1, 4–5, 10
(France) Peugeot Talbot Sport	Peugeot	205 Turbo 16; 205 Turbo 16 E2	M	(Argentina) Carlos Reutemann	8
(France) Peugeot Talbot Sport	Peugeot	205 Turbo 16; 205 Turbo 16 E2	M	(Sweden) Kalle Grundel	9, 12
(France) Peugeot Talbot Sport	Peugeot	205 Turbo 16; 205 Turbo 16 E2	M	(Italy) Giovanni del Zoppo	10
(France) Peugeot Talbot Sport	Peugeot	205 Turbo 16; 205 Turbo 16 E2	M	(Finland) Mikael Sundström	12
(Italy) Martini Racing	Lancia	Rally 037 evo Delta S4	P	(Finland) Henri Toivonen	1, 9–10, 12
(Italy) Martini Racing	Lancia	Rally 037 evo Delta S4	P	(Finland) Markku Alén	4–5, 9–10, 12
(Italy) Martini Racing	Lancia	Rally 037 evo Delta S4	P	(Italy) Attilio Bettega	4–5
(Italy) Martini Racing	Lancia	Rally 037 evo Delta S4	P	(Kenya) Vic Preston Jr	4
(Italy) Martini Racing	Lancia	Rally 037 evo Delta S4	P	(Kenya) Greg Criticos	4
(Italy) Jolly Club	Lancia	Rally 037 evo	P	(Italy) Miki Biasion	1, 3, 5, 10
(Italy) Jolly Club	Lancia	Rally 037 evo	P	(Italy) Dario Cerrato	10
(France) Citroën Compétitions	Citroën	Visa	M	(France) Jean-Claude Andruet	1
(France) Citroën Compétitions	Citroën	Visa	M	(France) Philippe Wambergue	1
(France) Citroën Compétitions	Citroën	Visa	M	(France) François Chauche	1
(France) Citroën Compétitions	Citroën	Visa	M	(France) Maurice Chomat	1
(France) Citroën Compétitions	Citroën	Visa	M	(France) Christian Dorche	1
(France) Citroën Compétitions	Citroën	Visa	M	(France) Olivier Tabatoni	5
(France) Citroën Compétitions	Citroën	Visa	M	(Italy) Gabriele Noberasco	10
(Japan) Mazda Rally Team Europe	Mazda	RX-7	M	(Sweden) Ingvar Carlsson	2, 6, 12
(Japan) Mazda Rally Team Europe	Mazda	RX-7	M	(Germany) Achim Warmbold	6
(Japan) Mazda Rally Team Europe	Mazda	RX-7	M	(New Zealand) Neil Allport	7
(Japan) Mazda Rally Team Europe	Mazda	RX-7	M	(New Zealand) Mike Montgomery	7
(Japan) Mazda Rally Team Europe	Mazda	RX-7	M	(Finland) Minna Sillankorva	9
(Japan) Mazda Rally Team Europe	Mazda	RX-7	M	(New Zealand) Rod Millen	12
(Germany) Opel Euro Team	Opel	Manta 400	M	(Finland) Rauno Aaltonen	4
(Germany) Opel Euro Team	Opel	Manta 400	M	(Germany) Erwin Weber	4, 12
(Germany) Opel Euro Team	Opel	Manta 400	M	(France) Guy Fréquelin	5
(Germany) Opel Euro Team	Opel	Manta 400	M	(United Kingdom) Russell Brookes	12
(Germany) Opel Euro Team	Opel	Manta 400	M	(United Kingdom) Jimmy McRae	12
(Germany) Opel Euro Team	Opel	Manta 400	M	(United Kingdom) Phil Colins	12
(Japan) Toyota Team Europe	Toyota	Celica TCT	P	(Sweden) Björn Waldegård	4, 7, 9, 11–12
(Japan) Toyota Team Europe	Toyota	Celica TCT	P	(Kenya) Dave Horsey	4
(Japan) Toyota Team Europe	Toyota	Celica TCT	P	(Finland) Juha Kankkunen	4, 7, 9, 11–12
(Japan) Team Nissan Europe	Nissan	240RS	D	(Kenya) Shekhar Mehta	4, 6–8
(Japan) Team Nissan Europe	Nissan	240RS	D	(Kenya) Jayant Shah	4, 6, 8
(Japan) Team Nissan Europe	Nissan	240RS	D	(Kenya) Mike Kirkland	4, 6, 11
(Japan) Team Nissan Europe	Nissan	240RS	D	(France) Alain Ambrosino	4, 11
(Japan) Team Nissan Europe	Nissan	240RS	D	(Greece) George Moschous	6
(Japan) Team Nissan Europe	Nissan	240RS	D	(Greece) Stratis Hatzipanayiotou	6
(Japan) Team Nissan Europe	Nissan	240RS	D	(New Zealand) Reg Cook	7
(Japan) Team Nissan Europe	Nissan	240RS	D	(New Zealand) Jim Donald	7
(Japan) Team Nissan Europe	Nissan	240RS	D	(Finland) Peter Geitel	9
(Japan) Team Nissan Europe	Nissan	240RS	D	(United Kingdom) Terry Kaby	12
(France) Renault Elf Philips	Renault	R5 Maxi Turbo	M	(France) Jean Ragnotti	5
(France) Renault Elf Philips	Renault	R5 Maxi Turbo	M	(France) François Chatriot	5
(France) Renault Elf Philips	Renault	R5 Maxi Turbo	M	(France) Didier Auriol	5
(Germany) Rothmans Porsche Rally Team	Porsche	911SC RS	M	(France) Bernard Béguin	5
(Germany) Rothmans Porsche Rally Team	Porsche	911SC RS	M	(Republic of Ireland) Billy Coleman	5
(Germany) Rothmans Porsche Rally Team	Porsche	911SC RS	M	(Qatar) Saeed Al-Hajri	6
(Italy) West Lancia Team	Lancia	Rally 037 evo	P	(Italy) Andrea Zanussi	6
(Italy) West Lancia Team	Lancia	Rally 037 evo	P	(Italy) Mauro Pregliasco	6
(United Kingdom) Austin Rover World Rally Team	MG	Metro 6R4	M	(United Kingdom) Tony Pond	12
(United Kingdom) Austin Rover World Rally Team	MG	Metro 6R4	M	(United Kingdom) Malcolm Wilson	12
(Germany) Volkswagen Motorsport	Volkswagen	Golf GTi	P	(Germany) Jochi Kleint	3, 5–6, 10
(Germany) Volkswagen Motorsport	Volkswagen	Golf GTi	P	(Austria) Franz Wittmann	3, 5–6, 10
(Japan) Subaru Motor Sport	Subaru	RX Turbo	P	(Kenya) Mike Kirkland	7
(Japan) Subaru Motor Sport	Subaru	RX Turbo	P	(New Zealand) Possum Bourne	7
(Japan) Subaru Motor Sport	Subaru	RX Turbo	P	(New Zealand) Tony Teesdale	7

== Events ==
=== Map ===
Black = Tarmac	Brown = Gravel	Blue = Snow/ice	Red = Mixed surface

=== Schedule and results ===
Round	Rally name	Stages	Podium finishers					
Round	Rally name	Stages	Rank	Driver	Co-driver	Team	Car	Time
1	(Monaco) Monte Carlo Rally (26 January–1 February)	34 stages 852 km Tarmac	1	(Finland) Ari Vatanen	(United Kingdom) Terry Harryman	(France) Peugeot Talbot Sport	Peugeot 205 T16	10:20:49
1	(Monaco) Monte Carlo Rally (26 January–1 February)	34 stages 852 km Tarmac	2	(West Germany) Walter Röhrl	(West Germany) Christian Geistdörfer	(West Germany) Audi Sport	Audi Sport Quattro	10:26:06
1	(Monaco) Monte Carlo Rally (26 January–1 February)	34 stages 852 km Tarmac	3	(Finland) Timo Salonen	(Finland) Seppo Harjanne	(France) Peugeot Talbot Sport	Peugeot 205 T16	10:30:54
2	(Sweden) Swedish Rally (15–17 February)	29 stages 505 km Snow/Ice	1	(Finland) Ari Vatanen	(United Kingdom) Terry Harryman	(France) Peugeot Talbot Sport	Peugeot 205 T16	4:38:49
2	(Sweden) Swedish Rally (15–17 February)	29 stages 505 km Snow/Ice	2	(Sweden) Stig Blomqvist	(Sweden) Björn Cederberg	(West Germany) Audi Sport	Audi Sport Quattro	4:40:38
2	(Sweden) Swedish Rally (15–17 February)	29 stages 505 km Snow/Ice	3	(Finland) Timo Salonen	(Finland) Seppo Harjanne	(France) Peugeot Talbot Sport	Peugeot 205 T16	4:42:15
3	Rally de Portugal (6–9 March)	47 stages 733 km Gravel/Tarmac	1	(Finland) Timo Salonen	(Finland) Seppo Harjanne	(France) Peugeot Talbot Sport	Peugeot 205 T16	8:07.25
3	Rally de Portugal (6–9 March)	47 stages 733 km Gravel/Tarmac	2	(Italy) Miki Biasion	(Italy) Tiziano Siviero	(Italy) Jolly Club	Lancia 037 Rally evo	8:12:12
3	Rally de Portugal (6–9 March)	47 stages 733 km Gravel/Tarmac	3	(West Germany) Walter Röhrl	(West Germany) Christian Geistdörfer	(West Germany) Audi Sport	Audi Sport Quattro	8:13:23
4	(Kenya) Safari Rally (4–8 April)	88 controls 5167.6 km Gravel	1	(Finland) Juha Kankkunen	(United Kingdom) Fred Gallagher	(Japan) Toyota Team Europe	Toyota Celica TCT	+5:18 pen
4	(Kenya) Safari Rally (4–8 April)	88 controls 5167.6 km Gravel	2	(Sweden) Björn Waldegård	(Sweden) Hans Thorszelius	(Japan) Toyota Team Europe	Toyota Celica TCT	+5:52 pen
4	(Kenya) Safari Rally (4–8 April)	88 controls 5167.6 km Gravel	3	(Kenya) Mike Kirkland	(Kenya) Anton Levitan	(Japan) Team Nissan Europe	Nissan 240RS	+6:01 pen
5	(France) Tour de Corse (2–4 May)	29 stages 1078 km Tarmac	1	(France) Jean Ragnotti	(France) Pierre Thimonier	(France) Renault Elf Philips	Renault R5 Maxi Turbo	12:54:15
5	(France) Tour de Corse (2–4 May)	29 stages 1078 km Tarmac	2	(France) Bruno Saby	(France) Jean-François Fauchille	(France) Peugeot Talbot Sport	Peugeot 205 T16 E2	13:06:47
5	(France) Tour de Corse (2–4 May)	29 stages 1078 km Tarmac	3	(France) Bernard Béguin	(France) Jean-Jacques Lenne	(West Germany) Rothmans Porsche Rally Team	Porsche 911 SC	13:20:04
6	(Greece) Acropolis Rally (27–30 May)	47 stages 807.8 km Gravel	1	(Finland) Timo Salonen	(Finland) Seppo Harjanne	(France) Peugeot Talbot Sport	Peugeot 205 T16	10:20:19
6	(Greece) Acropolis Rally (27–30 May)	47 stages 807.8 km Gravel	2	(Sweden) Stig Blomqvist	(Sweden) Björn Cederberg	(West Germany) Audi Sport	Audi Sport Quattro	10:24:34
6	(Greece) Acropolis Rally (27–30 May)	47 stages 807.8 km Gravel	3	(Sweden) Ingvar Carlsson	(Sweden) Benny Melander	(Japan) Mazda Rally Team Europe	Mazda RX-7	11:08:25
7	Rally New Zealand (29 June–2 July)	46 stages 894 km Gravel	1	(Finland) Timo Salonen	(Finland) Seppo Harjanne	(France) Peugeot Talbot Sport	Peugeot 205 T16 E2	8:29:16
7	Rally New Zealand (29 June–2 July)	46 stages 894 km Gravel	2	(Finland) Ari Vatanen	(United Kingdom) Terry Harryman	(France) Peugeot Talbot Sport	Peugeot 205 T16 E2	8:30:33
7	Rally New Zealand (29 June–2 July)	46 stages 894 km Gravel	3	(West Germany) Walter Röhrl	(West Germany) Christian Geistdörfer	(West Germany) Audi Sport	Audi Sport Quattro	8:31:42
8	Rally Argentina (31 July–3 August)	23 stages 959 km Gravel	1	(Finland) Timo Salonen	(Finland) Seppo Harjanne	(France) Peugeot Talbot Sport	Peugeot 205 T16 E2	10:04:33
8	Rally Argentina (31 July–3 August)	23 stages 959 km Gravel	2	(Austria) Wilfred Wiedner	(Austria) Franz Zehetner	(West Germany) Audi Sport	Audi Quattro A2	10:18:29
8	Rally Argentina (31 July–3 August)	23 stages 959 km Gravel	3	(Argentina) Carlos Reutemann	(France) Jean-François Fauchille	(France) Peugeot Talbot Sport	Peugeot 205 T16 E2	10:35:47
9	(Finland) 1000 Lakes Rally (23–25 August)	50 stages 479 km Gravel	1	(Finland) Timo Salonen	(Finland) Seppo Harjanne	(France) Peugeot Talbot Sport	Peugeot 205 T16 E2	4:10:35
9	(Finland) 1000 Lakes Rally (23–25 August)	50 stages 479 km Gravel	2	(Sweden) Stig Blomqvist	(Sweden) Björn Cederberg	(West Germany) Audi Sport	Audi Sport Quattro S1	4:11:23
9	(Finland) 1000 Lakes Rally (23–25 August)	50 stages 479 km Gravel	3	(Finland) Markku Alén	(Finland) Ilkka Kivimäki	(Italy) Martini Racing	Lancia 037 Rally evo	4:14:14
10	(Italy) Rallye Sanremo (29 September–4 October)	45 stages 650 km Gravel/Tarmac	1	(West Germany) Walter Röhrl	(West Germany) Christian Geistdörfer	(West Germany) Audi Sport	Audi Sport Quattro S1	7:10:10
10	(Italy) Rallye Sanremo (29 September–4 October)	45 stages 650 km Gravel/Tarmac	2	(Finland) Timo Salonen	(Finland) Seppo Harjanne	(France) Peugeot Talbot Sport	Peugeot 205 T16 E2	7:16:39
10	(Italy) Rallye Sanremo (29 September–4 October)	45 stages 650 km Gravel/Tarmac	3	(Finland) Henri Toivonen	(Finland) Juha Piironen	(Italy) Martini Racing	Lancia 037 Rally evo	7:18:02
11	(Ivory Coast) Rallye Côte d'Ivoire (30 October-3 November)	63 controls 4187 km Gravel	1	(Finland) Juha Kankkunen	(United Kingdom) Fred Gallagher	(Japan) Toyota Team Europe	Toyota Celica TCT	+4:46 pen
11	(Ivory Coast) Rallye Côte d'Ivoire (30 October-3 November)	63 controls 4187 km Gravel	2	(Sweden) Björn Waldegård	(Sweden) Hans Thorszelius	(Japan) Toyota Team Europe	Toyota Celica TCT	+4:46 pen
11	(Ivory Coast) Rallye Côte d'Ivoire (30 October-3 November)	63 controls 4187 km Gravel	3	(France) Alain Ambrosino	(France) Daniel Le Saux	(Japan) Team Nissan Europe	Nissan 240RS	+6:19 pen
12	(United Kingdom) RAC Rally (24–28 November)	63 stages 880 km Gravel/Tarmac	1	(Finland) Henri Toivonen	(United Kingdom) Neil Wilson	(Italy) Martini Racing	Lancia Delta S4	9:32.05
12	(United Kingdom) RAC Rally (24–28 November)	63 stages 880 km Gravel/Tarmac	2	(Finland) Markku Alén	(Finland) Ilkka Kivimäki	(Italy) Martini Racing	Lancia Delta S4	9:33.01
12	(United Kingdom) RAC Rally (24–28 November)	63 stages 880 km Gravel/Tarmac	3	(United Kingdom) Tony Pond	(United Kingdom) Rob Arthur	(United Kingdom) Austin Rover World Rally Team	MG Metro 6R4	9:34.32

== Standings ==
=== Drivers ===
Rank	Driver	Event												Total points
Rank	Driver	(Monaco) MON	(Sweden) SWE	(Portugal) POR	(Kenya) KEN	(France) FRA	(Greece) GRC	(New Zealand) NZL	(Argentina) ARG	(Finland) FIN	(Italy) ITA	(Ivory Coast) CIV	(United Kingdom) GBR	Total points
1	(Finland) Timo Salonen	12	12	20	4	-	20	20	20	20	15	-	-	127
2	(Sweden) Stig Blomqvist	10	15	10	-	-	15	10	-	15	-	-	-	75
3	(West Germany) Walter Röhrl	15	-	12	-	-	-	12	-	-	20	-	-	59
4	(Finland) Ari Vatanen	20	20	-	-	-	-	15	-	-	-	-	-	55
5	(Finland) Juha Kankkunen	-	-	-	20	-	-	-	-	-	-	20	8	48
6	(Finland) Henri Toivonen	6	-	-	-	-	-	-	-	10	12	-	20	48
7	(Finland) Markku Alén	-	-	-	-	-	-	-	-	12	10	-	15	37
8	(Sweden) Björn Waldegård	-	-	-	15	-	-	-	-	4	-	15	-	34
9	(Kenya) Mike Kirkland	-	-	-	12	-	4	-	-	-	-	10	-	26
