= Rally of Brazil =

- Category: Rallying — Speed Rally and Rally Raid
- Country: Brazil
- Inaugural season: 1973
- Classes: Rally2, Rally4, Rally5, Rally5 Light
- Drivers' champion: NA (2025 season)
- Teams' champion: NA (2025 season)
- Official website: www.cba.org.br

The Rally Brazil (Portuguese: Campeonato Brasileiro de Rali) is the collective name for the national rallying championships held in Brazil under the authority of the Brazilian Motorsport Confederation (Confederação Brasileira de Automobilismo, CBA) and its National Rally Commission (Comissão Nacional de Rally, CNR). The discipline is split into two separate and independently scored competitions: the Brazilian Speed Rally Championship (Campeonato Brasileiro de Rally de Velocidade), run over closed-road timed special stages, and the Brazilian Rally Raid Championship (Campeonato Brasileiro de Rally Raid, formerly cross-country), run over long-distance routes navigated by road book.

In 2026 the Speed Rally comprises five rounds held in Rio Grande do Sul and Santa Catarina, contested in the Rally2, Rally4, Rally5 and Rally5 Light categories, with separate classifications for drivers and co-drivers. The Rally Raid comprises seven events counting for eight rounds, spread across São Paulo, Rio Grande do Norte, Minas Gerais, Tocantins and Paraná, with classes for motorcycles, quads, UTVs, cars and trucks.

Both championships are governed by the Brazilian Motorsport Sporting Code (Código Desportivo do Automobilismo, CDA), by the sporting and technical regulations of each championship, and by the Supplementary Regulations of each event. The CBA is Brazil's National Sporting Authority (ASN), affiliated to the Fédération Internationale de l'Automobile (FIA) and to FIA Rally Codasur, the South American regional body.

== History ==
Organised rallying in Brazil began in the early 1950s, when members of the Sociedade Esportiva e Cultural dos Empregados da Light (SEGEL) started running events in the city of São Paulo. These were social gatherings more than sporting contests, closer to the original English sense of the word rally.

The first regional rally championship was organised in São Paulo in 1961. Four years later Rio de Janeiro, Minas Gerais, Paraná, Santa Catarina and Rio Grande do Sul established regional championships of their own. The first national championship was held in 1973, and the championship reached its 27th edition in 2008.

During the 2010s and 2020s the championship structure was progressively aligned with FIA technical nomenclature, replacing the former national Group N and Group A classes with the FIA-homologated Rally2, Rally4 and Rally5 categories.

== Speed Rally ==
=== Structure ===
The Brazilian Speed Rally Championship is contested in the Rally2, Rally4, Rally5 and Rally5 Light categories, the last of these aimed at competitors starting their careers. Drivers and co-drivers are classified separately, in their own per-category tables.

Rounds may be run over one or two competition days. On two-day rounds each day produces its own classification and points; single-day rounds use a different scale. Some rounds also include a Power Stage, a separately timed closing stage awarding bonus points.

=== Current points structure ===
The Sporting Code provides that the points system of each championship is defined in its own sporting regulations, and expressly allows points for partial results such as the Power Stage. According to the official 2026 classification document, the points observed are:

Position	1st	2nd	3rd	4th	5th	6th
Two-day round (per day)	12	9	7	6	5	4
Single-day round	18	14	11	9	NA	NA

In addition to the per-day points, 5 points are awarded for starting each round and 1 bonus point to the Power Stage winner. The season regulations also allow one result to be dropped.

=== Events ===
Rallies in 2026:

Round	Dates	Rally	Event base	Surface
01	19–22 March	Erechim Rally Brasil	Erechim, RS	gravel
02	1–3 May	Rally Estação	Estação, RS	gravel
03	4–5 July	Rally Nova Prata	Nova Prata, RS	gravel
04	11–13 September	Rally Rio Negrinho	Rio Negrinho, SC	gravel
05	17–18 October	Rally Nova Itália	Severiano de Almeida, RS	gravel

=== 2026 standings ===
Standings after round three (official document dated 6 July 2026):

Category	Leading driver	Points	Leading co-driver	Points
Rally2	Rodrigo Varela	84	Marco Marini	84
Rally4	Eduardo Tonial	62	Lucas Neumann	62
Rally5	Tiago Klimaczewski / Bruno Foscarini (tied)	59	Felipe Klimaczewski / Felipe Araujo Costa (tied)	59
Rally5 Light	Anderson Graeff	56	Evandro Frigo	51

== Rally Raid ==
Rally of Brazil
- Category: Rally raid (cross-country)
- Country: Brazil
- Inaugural season: NA
- Classes: Motorcycles, quads, UTV/SSV, cars, trucks
- Drivers' champion: NA (2025 season)
- Official website: rallybr.com.br/raid

The Brazilian Rally Raid Championship, historically known as the Brazilian Cross-Country Rally Championship, gathers long-distance events run on unpaved terrain with road-book navigation and classes for motorcycles, quads, UTVs, cars and trucks. Unlike speed rally rounds, several of its events run for three to nine days.

=== Format and navigation ===
The route of each event is defined by the road book issued to competitors. Organisers do not release the route tracklog, and possession or use of GPS route information obtained through unofficial channels results in exclusion. Course cutting is penalised under the sporting regulations, with specific fines for cuts across crops in marked sensitive areas.

A single event may count for more than one championship round: the XVI Rally Barretos, held on 13–15 March 2026 at the Parque do Peão in Barretos, counted as rounds 1 and 2 of the season, run on two consecutive days with one special stage of about 140 km on each. The event's own final classification is decided by cumulative time including penalties, rather than by championship points.

In the car classes, the 2026 Rally Barretos ran for Ultimate T1, Ultimate T1+, Ultimate Pró, Ultimate SP, Ultimate BR, Stock, Challenger, SSV and Truck.

=== Tracking and safety ===
Use of the Stella satellite tracking unit is mandatory and its installation is verified before scrutineering; disconnecting the antenna or power supply during an event is penalised, up to exclusion. Besides allowing a rescue request, the unit manages the overtaking procedure: from 400 metres behind, a competitor may send successive overtaking requests, and a leading driver who fails to allow the pass within set intervals receives escalating penalties, from added time and lost grid positions to being classified as a non-finisher for that leg.

=== Events ===
Rallies in 2026:

Round	Dates	Rally	Event base	Surface
01 and 02	13–15 March	XVI Rally Barretos	Barretos, SP	dirt
03	17–19 April	Rally RN 1500	Rio Grande do Norte	dirt and sand
04	15–17 May	Rally Minas Brasil	Araxá, MG	dirt
05	14–20 June	Rally Jalapão	Tocantins	dirt and sand
06	9–11 July	Sertões Series PR	Siqueira Campos, PR	dirt
07	22–30 August	Sertões	NA	dirt, sand and gravel
08	6–8 November	Sertões Series SP	São Paulo	dirt

As an indication of scale, the 2026 Sertões Series Paraná was run over three days with timed sections of 133.51 km, 150.21 km and 122.90 km.

== Previous seasons ==
=== 2018 season ===
The 2018 season comprised five rounds:

Round	Dates	Rally	Event base	Surface
01	8 April	Rali Estação	Rio Grande do Sul	NA
02	27 May	Rali Internacional de Erechim	Rio Grande do Sul	NA
03	22 July	Rali de Inverno	São Paulo	NA
04	16 September	Rali de São Bento	Santa Catarina	NA
05	18 November	Rali do Paraná	Paraná	NA

=== 2009 season ===
The 2009 season comprised eight rounds in five states. At the time, rounds of the Brazilian championship were mostly held over a single day, unlike the two- and three-day rounds of the world and South American championships.

Round	Dates	Rally	Event base	Surface
01	8 March	Rali Internacional de Curitiba	Paraná	NA
02	12 April	Rali de Tijucas or Blumenau	Santa Catarina	NA
03	9 May	Rali Internacional de Erechim	Rio Grande do Sul	NA
04	7 June	Venue to be confirmed	Minas Gerais	NA
05	12 July	Venue to be confirmed	Santa Catarina	NA
06	23 August	Venue to be confirmed	São Paulo	NA
07	20 September	Rali de Ouro Branco	Minas Gerais	NA
08	9 October	Rali de Estação	Rio Grande do Sul	NA

== See also ==
- Rallying
- Rally dos Sertões
- World Rally Championship
- World Rally-Raid Championship
