= 1991 Monte Carlo Rally =

Rallying motorsport event

1991 Monte Carlo Rally 59ème Rallye Automobile de Monte-Carlo
Round 1 of the 1991 World Rally Championship
Next event →
- Host country: Monaco
- Dates run: 24 – 30 January 1991
- Stages: 27
- Stage surface: Asphalt/Snow
- Overall distance: 628.64 km (390.62 miles)

Statistics
- Crews: 165 at start, 75 at finish

Overall results
- Overall winner: (Spain) Carlos Sainz; Toyota Celica GT-4 (ST165); 6:57:21

The 1991 Monte Carlo Rally was the 59th Rallye Automobile de Monte-Carlo. It was won by Carlos Sainz.

It was part of the 1991 World Rally Championship.

== Results ==
Pos.	No.	Driver	Car	Time/Retired	Pts.
1	5	(Spain) Carlos Sainz	Toyota Celica GT-4 (ST165)	6:57:21	20
2	7	(Italy) Miki Biasion	Lancia Delta Integrale 16V	7:02:20	15
3	2	(France) François Delecour	Ford Sierra RS Cosworth 4x4	7:02:33	12
4	11	(Germany) Armin Schwarz	Toyota Celica GT-4 (ST165)	7:03:52	10
5	8	(Finland) Juha Kankkunen	Lancia Delta Integrale 16V	7:05:07	8
6	12	(France) Bruno Saby	Lancia Delta Integrale 16V	7:06:34	6
7	14	(England) Malcolm Wilson	Ford Sierra RS Cosworth 4x4	7:08:36	4
8	6	(Finland) Timo Salonen	Mitsubishi Galant VR-4	7:08:43	3
9	24	(France) Yves Loubet	Lancia Delta Integrale 16V	7:10:00	2
10	17	(Italy) Alessandro Fiorio	Ford Sierra RS Cosworth 4x4	7:21:03	1
