= Nissan 240RS =

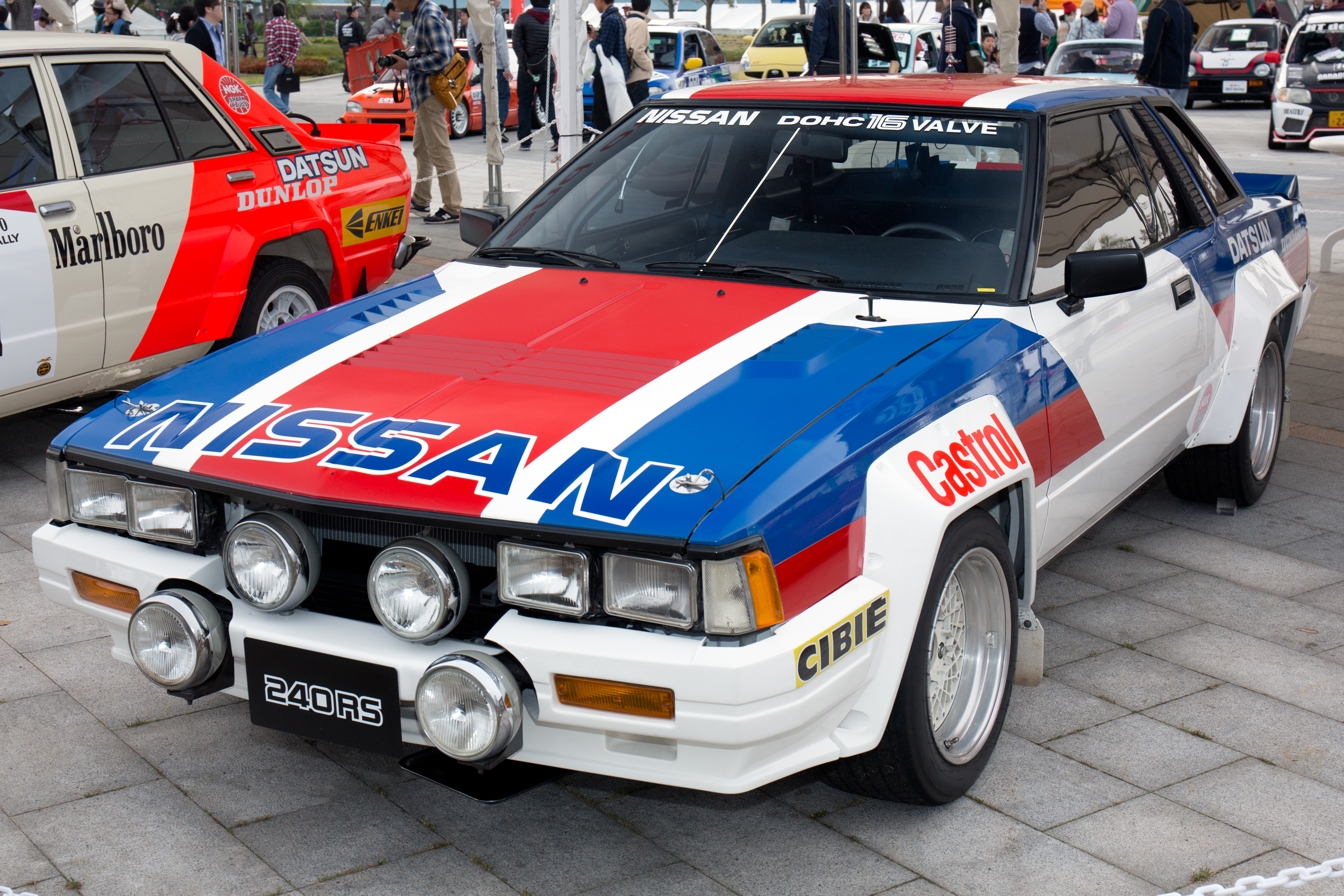
- Category: Group B

Technical specifications
- Chassis: Steel monocoque, steel body panels
- Suspension (front): MacPherson strut with 2 lower 'A' links, adjustable pivots, coil springs, telescopic gas shock absorbers and antiroll bar
- Suspension (rear): Live axle with 2 lower longitudinal radius links, 2 upper small 45o locating links, adjustable pivots, coil springs and telescopic gas shock absorbers
- Length: 4,330 mm (170 in)
- Width: 1,800 mm (71 in)
- Height: 1,310 mm (52 in)
- Wheelbase: 2,400 mm (94 in)
- Engine: Nissan 2,340 cc (142.8 cu in) DOHC 16v I4 naturally-aspirated, FR
- Weight: 970 kg (2,138 lb)

Competition history

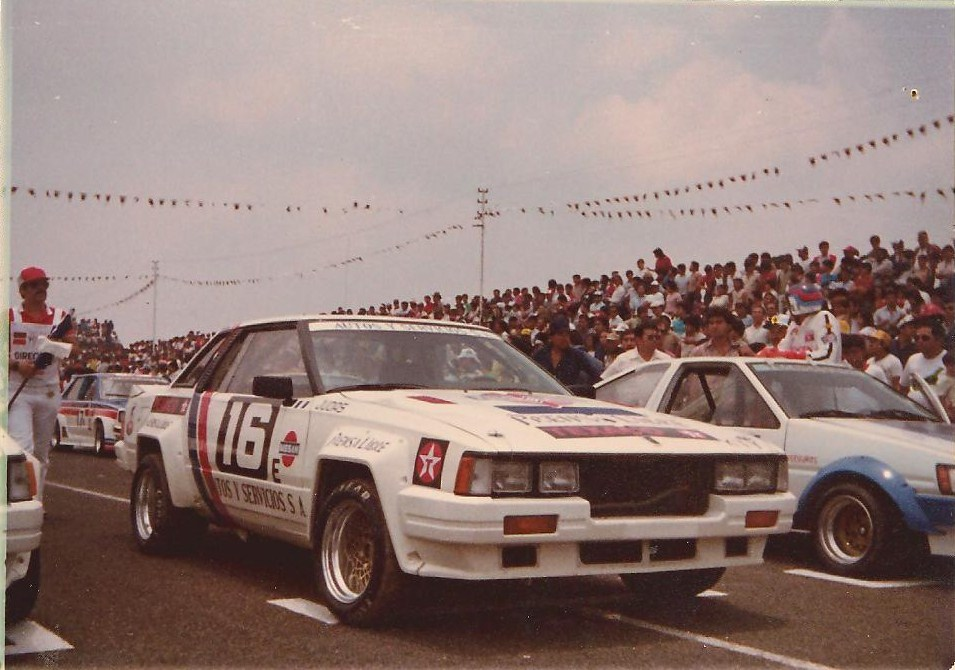
Nissan 240RS of Fernando Ibargüen

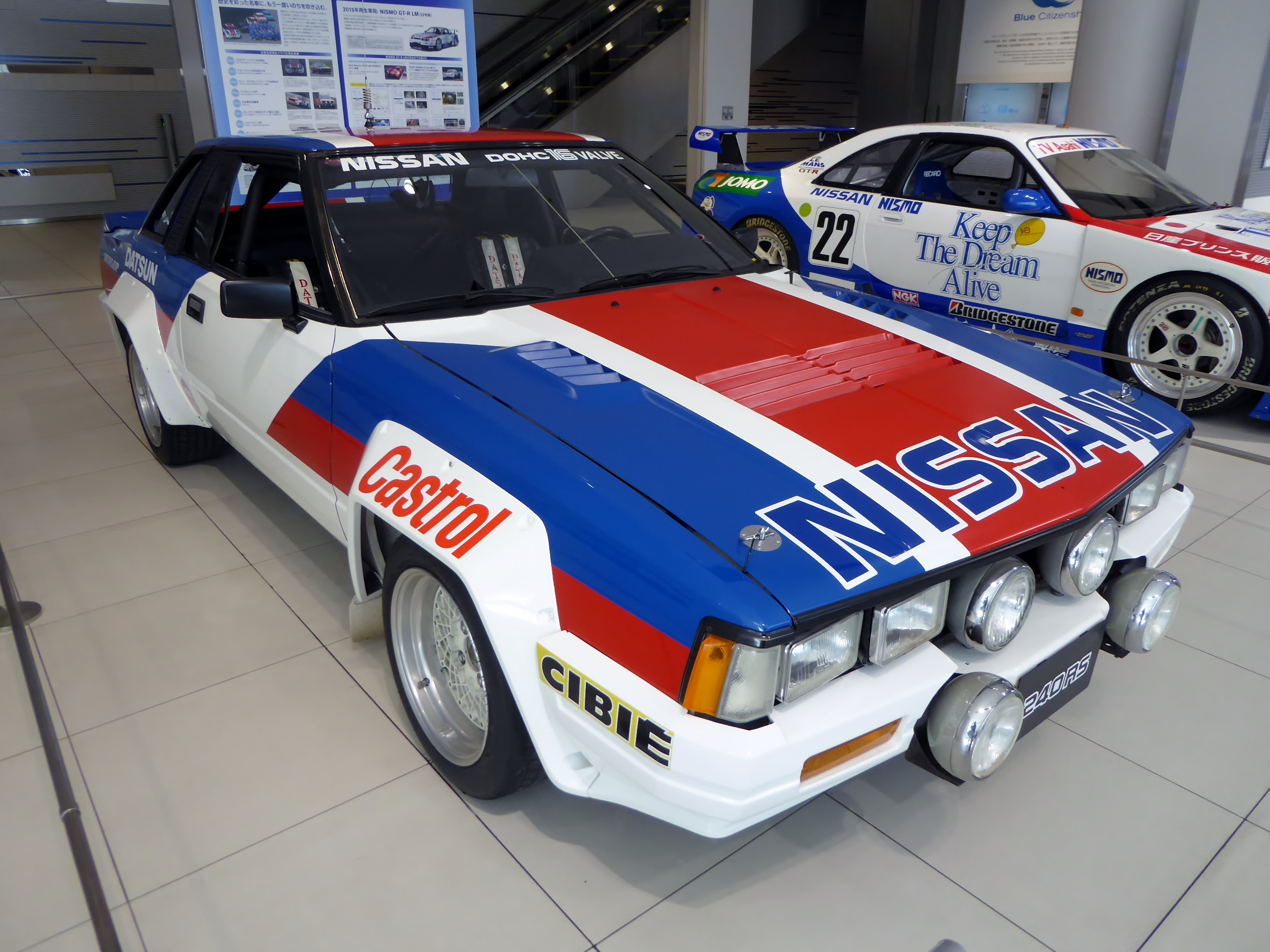
Nissan 240RS (BS110) front

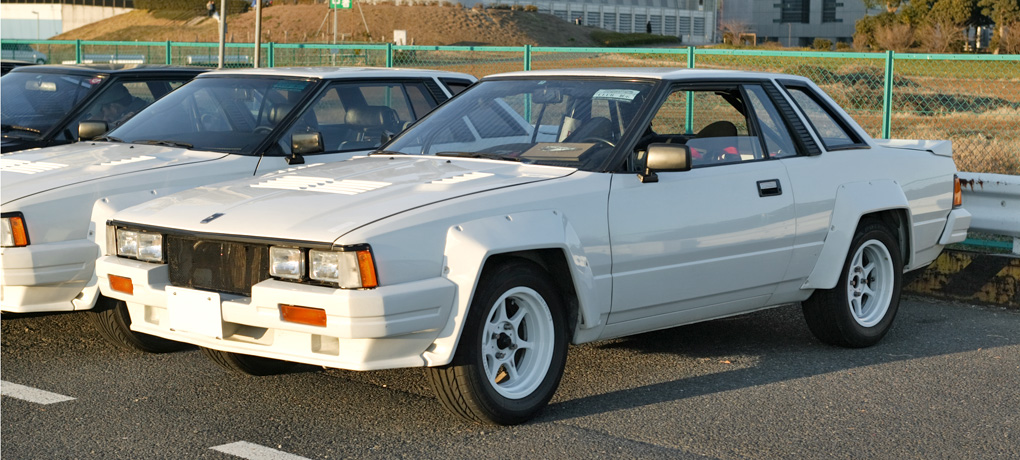
Road-going homologation version

The Nissan 240RS is a Group B rally car, designed, developed and manufacturer by Japanese company Nissan for the World Rally Championship, between 1983 and 1986. It was based on the third generation Nissan Silvia S110 series notchback coupe body shell.

== Development ==
The year before the introduction of the 240RS, a Group 4 specification car equipped with the LZ20B type (215PS) on the S110 type Silvia, which became the base model, participated in the 30th Safari Rally in 1982 and won 3rd place overall.

In addition, the LZ24B type, which is a version with an increased displacement of the LZ20B type, was developed and installed in the S110 type Silvia, which also has Group 4 specifications, and has participated in several overseas rallies. It is said that these were testbed vehicles for the 240RS, which was scheduled to be announced the following year.

Masahiro Hasemi, a former racing driver and Nissan works driver at the time, also participated in the development of the machine. It is said that the origin of the car's name comes from the fact that it is equipped with an engine with a displacement of 2,400cc and a maximum output of 240 horsepower.

== Production ==
Production volume is said to be 200 or so, slightly exceeding the 200 required for Group B certification. Mostly left-hand drive models were sold, but a small number of right-hand drive cars existed. According to one theory, 150 left-hand and 50 right-hand drive vehicles were produced out of the total production volume, and about 30 of these were used in each country's WRC and domestic rally championships.

A small number were sold in Japan, mainly to those involved in the rally, but no detailed records remain, and the exact number of sales is unknown.

Since this machine was intended for overseas rally competition, it was expected to be sold overseas, and it was not expected to be sold in Japan. Therefore, clearing Japanese exhaust gas regulations was not considered. Unlike other Group B road models, the customer-spec cars were produced with competition specifications ready for immediate entry into the rally, unlike the ones with specifications and interior/exterior modifications suitable for general use. For that reason, combined with a simple and robust mechanism, it has come in handy for privateers.

== Technical specifications ==
The 2,340cc, 240PS FJ24 type was used for the 240RS homologation model and customer spec vehicle (road model). Fuel supply, including the evolution model described later, was a carburetor.

The 240RS works car had an evolution model equipped with a modified FJ24 that generated 275PS (some say 280PS). On the Evo model, the brakes are also reinforced with φ261mm ventilated discs, and the handbrake is changed to a hydraulic type. Changes have been made, such as increasing the capacity of the fuel tank by 7L. In the 1985 Safari Rally model, the displacement was raised to 2,391cc by slightly increasing the bore.

The FJ24 type engine has a different structure from the FJ20E type sold in Japan, and has almost no common parts. Therefore, there is a theory that it is a bore-up version of the FJ20E type, but this is a mistake, and in reality, it is a competition engine that is completely different from the FJ20E type.

== Competition history ==
The best result in the WRC it participated in from 1983 to 1986 was 2nd. Although the maximum output was less than 300 horsepower, the production volume was less than 5,000 units, so it could not participate in the competition after 1987 when the WRC began to be held with Group A vehicles.

Also, although it is a local competition, the 240RS has been entered in the recent Targa Tasmania Rally by a Japanese enthusiast and has achieved good results.

== Legacy ==
At the 2006 Nismo Festival, volunteers from Nissan completed a restored works machine and performed a demonstration run. This vehicle is currently stored in Nissan's Zama Memorial Garage.
