= Roger Clark (rally driver) =

British rally driver (1939–1998)

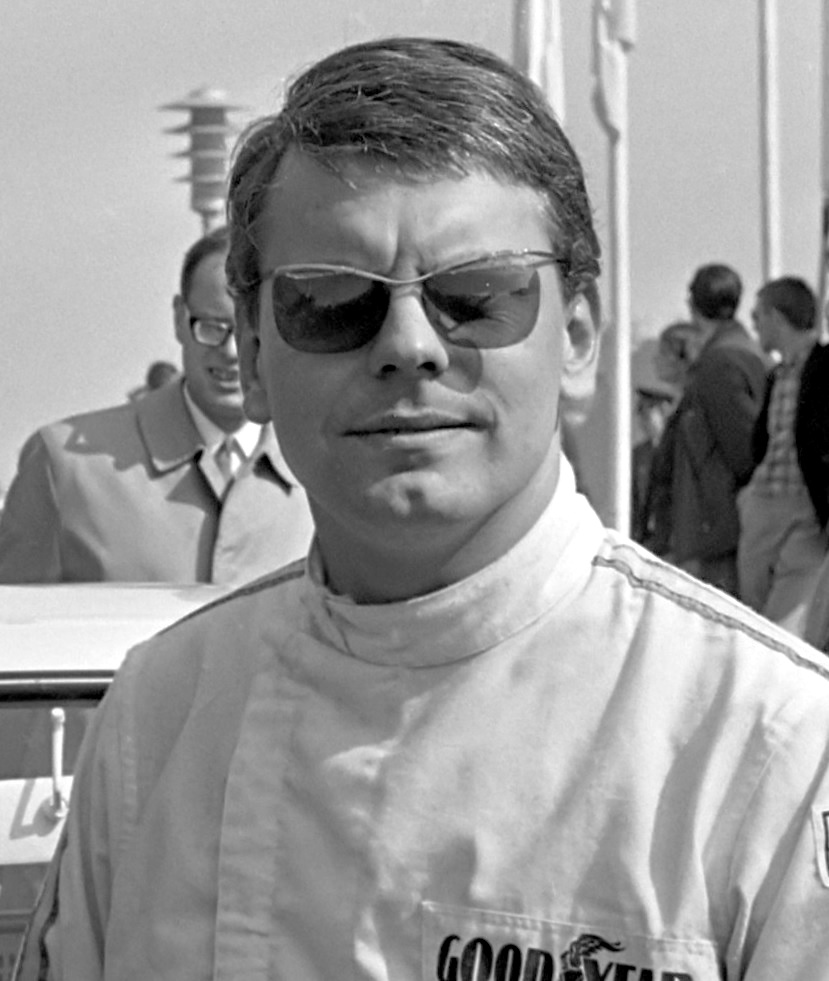
- Clark in 1968

Personal information
- Nationality: (United Kingdom) British
- Born: 5 August 1939
- Died: 12 January 1998 (aged 58)

World Rally Championship record
- Years active: 1973–1981, 1984, 1995
- Co-driver: (United Kingdom) Jim Porter (United Kingdom) Tony Mason (South Africa) Stuart Pegg (United Kingdom) Neil Wilson (United Kingdom) Chris Serle (United Kingdom) Ian Grindrod (United Kingdom) Max Harvey
- Teams: Ford, British Leyland, M.C.D. Services, Prodrive
- Rallies: 21
- Championships: 0
- Rally wins: 1
- Podiums: 5
- Stage wins: 51
- Total points: 1
- First rally: 1973 Safari Rally
- First win: 1976 RAC Rally
- Last win: 1976 RAC Rally
- Last rally: 1995 RAC Rally

Roger Albert Clark, MBE (5 August 1939 – 12 January 1998) was a British rally driver during the 1960s and '70s, and the first competitor from his country to win a World Rally Championship (WRC) event when he triumphed at the 1976 RAC Rally.

== Early life ==
The son of a motor dealer also named Roger Clark, after an education at Hinckley Grammar School where he gained 5 O Levels, like his younger brother Stan Clark - also later a rally driver - he joined his father's business as an apprentice. He learned about cars as a mechanic, and then helped the business take on new sales franchises. By 1975 there were four Roger Clark Cars Ltd. garages in the Leicester area, retailing under franchise agreements Alfa Romeo, Ford, Jensen, Lotus, Renault and Porsche.

== Career ==
=== Club racing ===
Clark passed his driving test in 1956, and immediately joined the Leicester Car Club, where he met Jim Porter, who was his co-driver for 20 years.

Initially borrowing a Ford Model Y from his father's garage, he made his rallying debut at club level in 1956 in a pre-WWII Ford Prefect. The car used number plate 2 ANR, which Clark retained throughout his career, and often used for later private entries. After moving to compete in a 1950s Ford 100E van, in 1960 Clark and Porter began being placed after switching to a BMC Mini Cooper. In this car they won the East Midlands Rally Championship (1961 and 1962), came fourth overall and a class win in the International Circuit of Ireland (1963), third in the Motoring News Championship (1963), and third in his first Scottish Rally (1963).

=== Works drives ===
This success led to a series of works drives. In 1963 he drove a Triumph TR4 for Spa-Sofia-Liege, and in the same year a Reliant Sabre in the Alpine Rally. In 1964, whilst experimenting privately with a Ford Cortina GT, Clark agreed a two-year works deal with the Rover Company, for which in 1965 the pair won their Monte Carlo Rally category in a Rover 2000. During this period he also made the first two of his six Scottish Rally wins in 1964 in his private Ford Cortina, and with combined results won the first of his four British Rally Championship in 1965. Roger drove for BL during the 1980 season where he competed in the iconic TR7 V8 but with limited success.

=== Ford works team ===
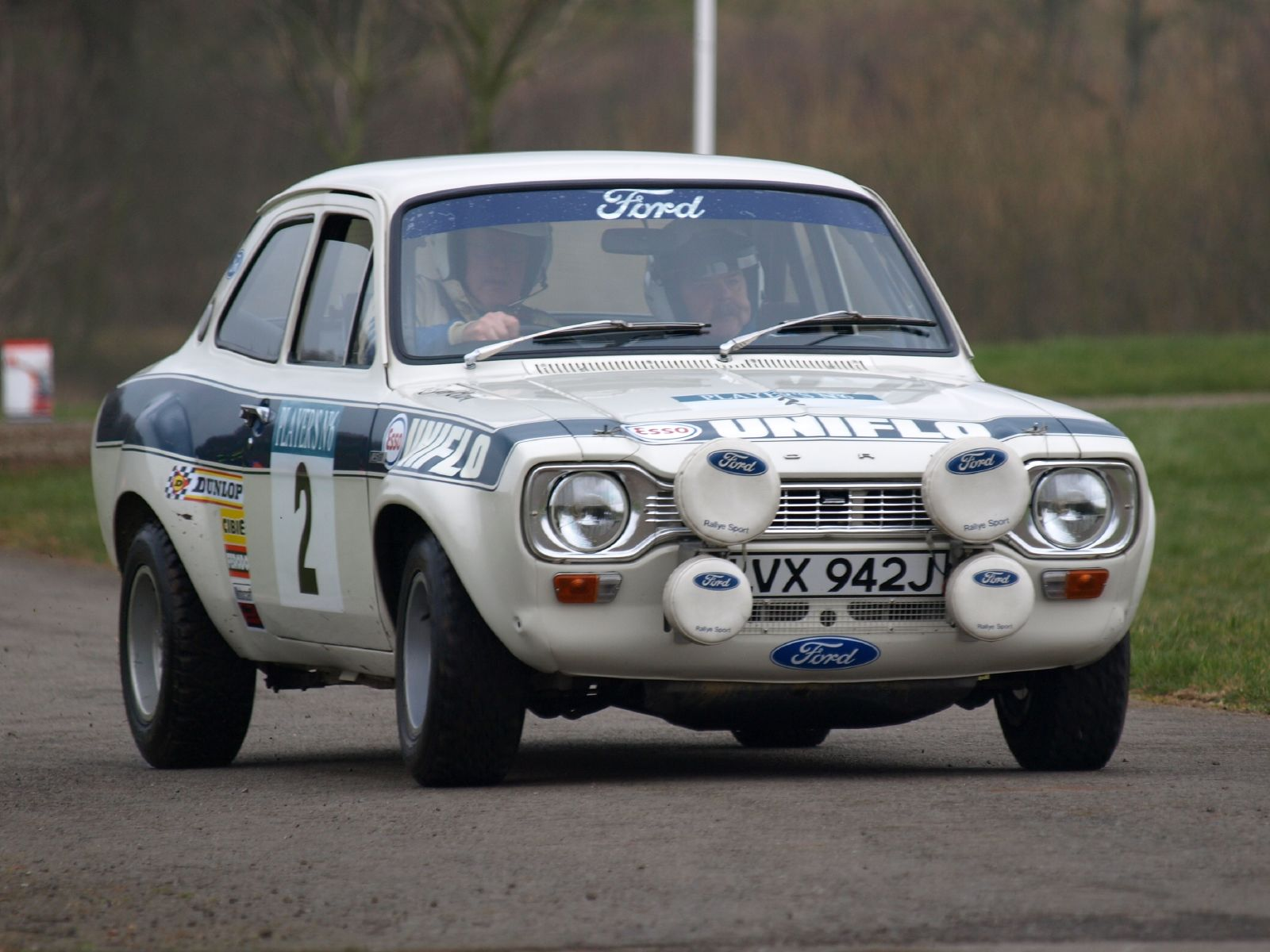
Clark's 1972 RAC Rally-winning Escort RS1600

In 1966 Clark and Porter signed to a works Ford of Britain deal, with the successful partnership lasting 15 years. Ford of Britain lead the Ford of Europe rallying team, sponsored by Esso Uniflo, with Clark initially signed into a three-driver team all using the Ford Cortina GT alongside Vic Elford and Bengt Soderstrom. Under their customised contract, the company initially supplied Clark and Porter with improved chassis, body and full works blue-printed engines, which Clark then had built into rally cars in his own workshops. In 1968 Clark switched to the car that he was most associated with, the Ford Escort RS, which he rallied in works form until 1979, and then privately until he retired in the 1980s. Clark and Porter won British Rally Championship titles again in 1972, 1973 and 1975.

His most notable successes came in the RAC Rally, the UK's biggest rally race. But as Porter was contracted to work for the rally organisers, Clark was forced to hire-in co-drivers for each of his wins. Clark won twice, in 1972 with Tony Mason, and then again - with the cars now sponsored by Cossack Hairspray, and hence coloured red - in 1976 with Stuart Pegg when it was part of the WRC, a feat that would not be emulated for over fifteen years.

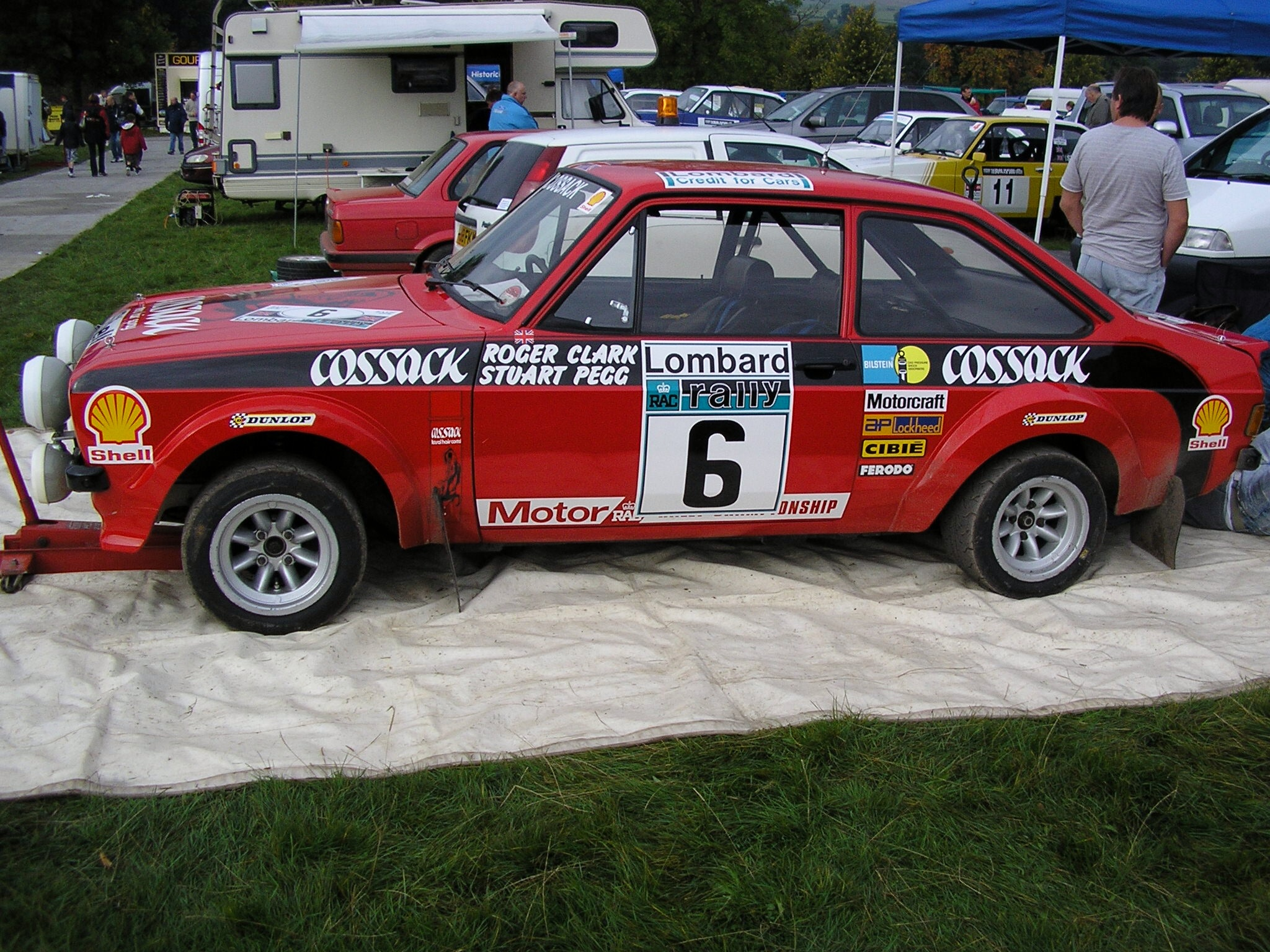
Clark's Cossack sponsored Ford Escort RS1800, winner of the 1976 Lombard RAC Rally

Clark and Porter also won the Acropolis Rally in 1968, the Circuit of Ireland in 1970, and the Scottish Rally on six occasions, among a total of 40 national and international victories. In 1973, Clark led the East African Safari Rally by over an hour, when forced to retire at the halfway stage with a disintegrating car.

As part of his later extended works-deal with Ford, Clark was contracted and paid as a development driver, for which he was asked to rally unusual models. These development excursions included rallying a Ford Zodiac in Eastern Europe, a Ford Capri in the Tour of Britain; and a Ford Escort attached to a Sprite Alpine to compete in the RAC and Caravan Club organised Caravan Rally of Great Britain, centred around Silverstone Circuit.

Between 1969 and 1971, Clark also raced the Ford works team's Capri in Rallycross events across the UK. The 4WD V6-powered cars were initially successful against their 2WD opponents, but reliability issues and problems with drivability meant Ford dropped the Capri programme.

=== Later rallying career ===
Clark remained very loyal to Ford, but did on rare occasions compete in other makes. Due to undertake the 1974 BOAC 500 in a Porsche 911 Carrera, the assigned car did not start the event. However, many spectators did see a Porsche UK demonstrator Carrera compete the event, carrying the number plate 2 ANR.

In 1975 Clark and Porter were recipients of the Segrave Trophy, bestowed upon "the Briton who accomplishes the most outstanding demonstration of the possibilities of transport by land, sea, air, or water." He was awarded the MBE in 1979.

== Post-professional rallying ==
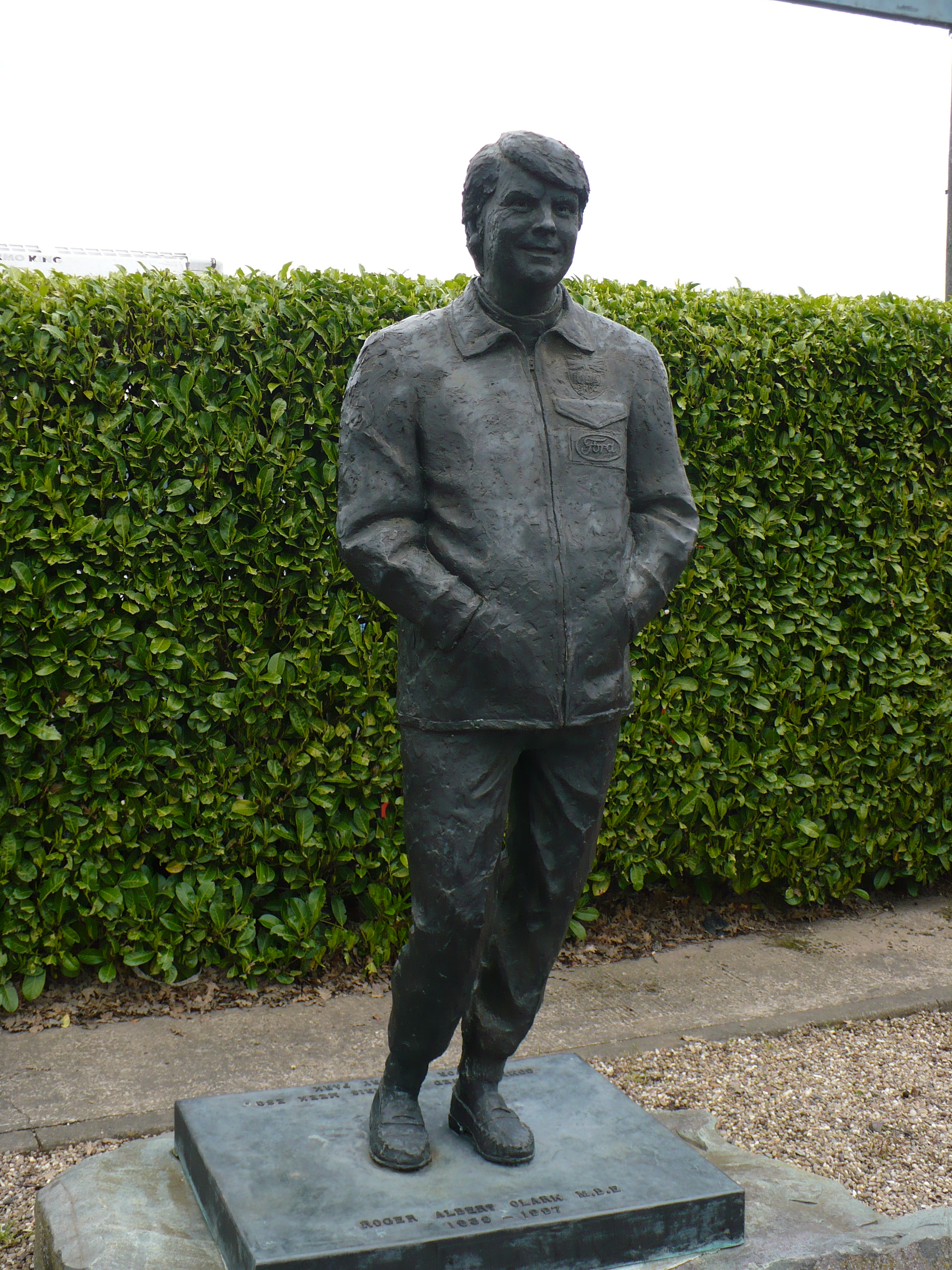
Bronze statue of Roger Clark MBE at Mallory Park

Clark never really retired from the sport of rallying, merely dropping back to club events again after his commercial sponsorship and supply of competitive cars dropped off, in part due to the new 4x4 Audi Quattro driven era. Clark remained influential in rallying and motorsport through committee membership of the British Racing Drivers Club, through which he helped to develop a new Rallysprint circuit at Silverstone in 1997.

Clark focused most of his efforts on building the family business with his brother Stan in Leicestershire, having also opened "Roger Clark Cars" in Narborough in the 1970s. With all the businesses closed in the early 1990s due to the hard economic down turn, even with poor health in the mid-1990s he set-up "Roger Clark Motor Sport", which now run by his son Matt still prepares cars for others to use in rallying. His other son Olly Clark has been a competitor in the Time Attack UK series (winning the championship in 2008), Network Q Rally of Great Britain and the FIA Cup for Drivers of Production Cars.

His autobiography co-authored by Graham Robson reflected his skill - on any surface - to make the Ford Escort "dance" sideways through corners, like his world-class Scandinavians equals Hannu Mikkola and Björn Waldegård, entitled Sideways . . . to Victory.

Clark died from the effects of a stroke on 12 January 1998. A bronze statue of Clark was later erected in his memory at Mallory Park.

== Roger Albert Clark Rally ==
In 2004, a historic rally event was established to recreate the route of the "classic" five day long RAC Rally across the country, as the current rally format by the FIA WRC is scheduled under the existing shorter rally franchise layout, and is undertaken mainly in Wales. The event was named the Roger Albert Clark Rally (also called the RAC Rally) in his honour. Competitors are limited to vehicles released prior to 1982, and traces a route through classic stages in Scotland and northern England, such as the Kielder Forest and Grizedale Forest which are no longer part of the modern WRC rallies' itinerary. The rally was held annually until 2014, and later on odd years since 2017.

== Personal life ==
Clark married Judith Barr in 1965, and the couple had two sons.

== Racing record ==
=== Complete IMC results ===
Year	Entrant	Car	1	2	3	4	5	6	7	8	9
1970	Ford Motor Company Ltd	Ford Escort TC	MON; 5	SWE	ITA	KEN	AUT	GRE			
1970	Ford Motor Company Ltd	Ford Escort RS1600							GBR; Ret		
1971	Ford Motor Company Ltd	Ford Escort TC	MON	SWE	ITA	KEN; 24	MAR	AUT	GRE	FRA	
1971	Ford Motor Company Ltd	Ford Escort RS1600									GBR; 11
1972	Ford Motor Company Ltd	Ford Escort RS1600	MON	SWE	KEN	MAR	GRE	AUT	ITA	USA	GBR; 1

=== Complete WRC results ===
Year	Entrant	Car	1	2	3	4	5	6	7	8	9	10	11	12	13	WDC	Pts
1973	Ford Motor Company Ltd	Ford Escort RS1600	MON	SWE	POR	KEN; Ret	MOR	GRE	POL	FIN	AUT	ITA	USA	GBR; 2	FRA	N/A	N/A
1974	Ford Motor Company Ltd	Ford Escort RS1600	POR	KEN	FIN	ITA	CAN	USA	GBR; 7	FRA						N/A	N/A
1975	Ford Motor Company Ltd	Ford Escort RS1800	MON	SWE	KEN	GRE	MOR	POR	FIN	ITA; Ret	FRA	GBR; 2				N/A	N/A
1976	Ford Motor Company Ltd	Ford Escort RS1800	MON; 5	SWE	POR	KEN	GRC	MOR; Ret	FIN	ITA	FRA	GBR; 1				N/A	N/A
1977	Ford Motor Company Ltd	Ford Escort RS1800	MON	SWE	POR; Ret	KEN; Ret	NZL	GRC; 2	FIN	CAN; 3	ITA	FRA	GBR; 4			N/A	N/A
1978	Ford Motor Company Ltd	Ford Escort RS1800	MON	SWE	KEN	POR	GRE	FIN	CAN	ITA	CIV	FRA	GBR; Ret			N/A	N/A
1979	Ford Motor Company Ltd	Ford Fiesta 1600S	MON; 13	SWE	POR	KEN										NC	0
1979	Ford Motor Company Ltd	Ford Escort RS1800					GRE; Ret	NZL	FIN	CAN	ITA	FRA	GBR; Ret	CIV		NC	0
1980	British Leyland Cars	Triumph TR7 V8	MON	SWE	POR	KEN	GRC	ARG	FIN	NZL	ITA	FRA	GBR; Ret	CIV		NC	0
1981	M.C.D. Rally Team	Ford Escort RS1800	MON	SWE	POR	KEN	FRA	GRC	ARG	BRA	FIN	ITA	CIV	GBR; 10		63rd	1
1984	Rothmans Porsche Rally Team	Porsche 911 SC RS	MON	SWE	POR	KEN	FRA	GRC	NZL	ARG	FIN	ITA	CIV	GBR; 11		NC	0
1995	Roger Clark	Subaru Impreza WRX	MON	SWE	POR	FRA	NZL	AUS	ESP	GBR; 36						NC	0

=== Complete British Saloon Car Championship results ===
(key) (Races in bold indicate pole position; races in italics indicate fastest lap.)

Year	Team	Car	Class	1	2	3	4	5	6	7	8	9	10	11	DC	Pts	Class
1967	Team Surtees	Ford Cortina Lotus	C	BRH	SNE	SIL	SIL	MAL	SIL	SIL	BRH	OUL; Ret†	BRH		NC	0	NC
1968	Alan Mann Racing	Ford Escort TC	C	BRH	THR	SIL	CRY	MAL	BRH; Ret	SIL	CRO	OUL	BRH	BRH	NC	0	NC

† Events with 2 races staged for the different classes.

== Career record ==
- Acropolis Rally, Winner: 1968
- Tulip Rally, Winner: 1968
- Circuit of Ireland, Winner: 1968, 1969, 1970
- Scottish Rally, Winner: 1964, 1965, 1967, 1968, 1973, 1975
- Cyprus Rally, Winner : 1978,1980
