= Blair Robson =

New Zealand rally driver (born 1935)

Personal information
- Nationality: (New Zealand) New Zealander
- Born: 15 May 1935 (age 91)

World Rally Championship record
- Years active: 1977, 1979, 1984
- Co-driver: (New Zealand) Chris Porter (New Zealand) Don Campbell
- Teams: Masport
- Rallies: 3
- Championships: 0
- Rally wins: 0
- Podiums: 1
- Stage wins: 1
- Total points: 16
- First rally: 1977 South Pacific Rally
- Last rally: 1984 Rally of New Zealand

Blair Robson (born 15 May 1935) is a former New Zealand rally driver.

Robson finished second in the 1979 Rally of New Zealand, driving a Ford Escort RS 1800 MKII. He won the 1974 and 1978 New Zealand National Rally and was seeded seventh on the New Zealand Silver Fern Rally. His son, Patrick Robson, acted as his co-driver as of 2006. His contributions to rally driving were recognised at the Motorsport New Zealand 50th anniversary event.

== Complete WRC results ==
Year	Entrant	Car	1	2	3	4	5	6	7	8	9	10	11	12	WDC	Pts
1977	Masport	Ford Escort RS1800	MON	SWE	POR	KEN	NZL; Ret	GRC	FIN	CAN	ITA	FRA	GBR		N/A	N/A
1979	Masport	Ford Escort RS1800	MON	SWE	POR	KEN	GRE	NZL; 2	FIN	CAN	ITA	FRA	GBR	CIV	16th	15
1984	Heatway	Mitsubishi Lancer 2000 Turbo	MON	SWE	POR	KEN	FRA	GRC	NZL; 10	ARG	FIN	ITA	CIV	GBR	62nd	1
