= 1978 World Rally Championship =

6th season of the World Rally Championship series

Champions
- FIA Cup for Drivers Champion: Markku Alén
- World Manufacturers' Champion: Fiat

Seasons
- ← 1977 1979 →

The 1978 World Rally Championship was the sixth season of the Fédération Internationale de l'Automobile (FIA) World Rally Championship (WRC). The schedule remained largely similar to the previous year, with the exception of the removal of the Rally New Zealand from the schedule.

1978 was the last season with an official world championship only for manufacturers. Scoring was modified in 1977 to a more complex system including points both for overall and group placement. A car would still have to place in the overall top 10 to score points. In addition to the Championship for Manufacturers, the FIA awarded the FIA Cup for Rally Drivers. All rallies of the WRC, in addition to another ten events, were counted towards the drivers' totals. In 1979, the Cup for Drivers was incorporated into the WRC as the World Rally Championship for Drivers.

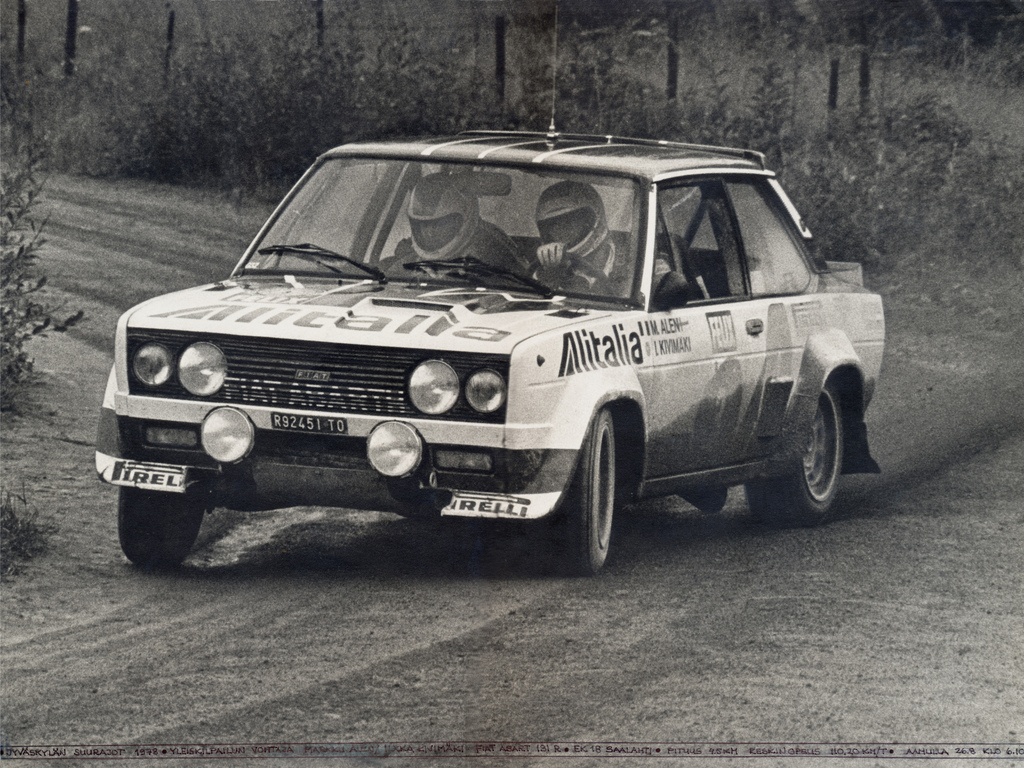
Markku Alen clinched the FIA Cup for Drivers and helped Fiat to win a second WRC manufacturers' championship.

== Calendar ==
Rd.	Start date	Finish date	Rally	Rally headquarters	Surface	Stages	Distance	Points
1	21 January	27 January	(Monaco) 46th Rallye Automobile Monte-Carlo	Monte Carlo	Mixed	29	565 km	Drivers & Manufacturers
2	3 February	5 February	(Finland) 13th Marlboro Arctic Rally	Rovaniemi, Lapland	Snow	43	??	Cup for Drivers
3	10 February	12 February	(Sweden) 28th International Swedish Rally	Karlstad, Värmland County	Snow	38	615.6 km	Drivers & Manufacturers
4	23 March	27 March	(Kenya) 26th Safari Rally	Nairobi	Gravel	N/A	5016 km	Drivers & Manufacturers
5	19 April	24 April	12th Rallye de Portugal - Vinho do Porto	Estoril, Lisbon	Mixed	46	633.4 km	Drivers & Manufacturers
6	29 May	2 June	(Greece) 25th Acropolis Rally	Athens	Gravel	54	772.1 km	Drivers & Manufacturers
7	3 June	7 June	(Scotland) 33rd Esso-Lombard Scottish Rally	Aviemore	Gravel	59	370 km	Cup for Drivers
8	6 July	9 July	(Poland) 38th Rajd Polski	Wroclaw	Mixed	53	578.9 km	Cup for Drivers
9	25 August	27 August	(Finland) 28th Jyväskylän Suurajot - Rally of the 1000 Lakes	Jyväskylä, Central Finland	Gravel	45	367.2 km	Drivers & Manufacturers
10	2 September	9 September	9th Motogard Rally of New Zealand	Auckland	Gravel	??	893 km	Cup for Drivers
11	13 September	17 September	(Canada) 6th Critérium Molson du Québec	Montreal	Mixed	14	533.7 km	Drivers & Manufacturers
12	16 September	21 September	37th Tour de France Automobile	Biarritz, Nice	Mixed	47	1009.5 km	Cup for Drivers
13	2 October	8 October	(Italy) 20th Rallye Sanremo	Sanremo, Liguria	Mixed	55	893.8 km	Drivers & Manufacturers
14	13 October	18 October	(Italy) 6th Giro d'Italia	Torino	Tarmac	??	535 km	Cup for Drivers
15	14 October	18 October	(Australia) 13th Southern Cross International Rally	Sydney	Mixed	33	1513.16 km	Cup for Drivers
16	20 October	22 October	(Spain) 26th RACE Rallye de España	Circuito del Jarama	Mixed	??	??	Cup for Drivers
17	21 October	24 October	(Ivory Coast) 10th Rallye Bandama Côte d'Ivoire	Abidjan	Gravel	N/A	5472 km	Drivers & Manufacturers
18	4 November	5 November	22nd Tour de Corse - Rallye de France	Ajaccio, Corsica	Tarmac	10	543.1 km	Drivers & Manufacturers
19	19 November	23 November	(United Kingdom) 34th Lombard RAC Rally	Birmingham	Gravel	76	715.37 km	Drivers & Manufacturers

Rounds that were only part of the FIA Cup for Rally Drivers are not officially recognised as WRC events.

== Events ==
=== Map ===
Black = Tarmac	Brown = Gravel	Blue = Snow/ice	Red = Mixed surface

=== Schedule and results ===
Rally	Dates run	Championships	Podium Drivers (Finishing Time)	Podium Cars
(Monaco) Monte Carlo Rally	21–28 January	Manufacturers; Drivers	1. (France) Jean-Pierre Nicolas (6h:57m:03s); 2. (France) Jean Ragnotti (6h:58m:55s); 3. (France) Guy Fréquelin (6h:59m:55s)	1. Porsche 911; 2. Renault 5 Alpine; 3. Renault 5 Alpine
(Finland) Arctic Rally	3–5 February	Drivers	1. (Finland) Ari Vatanen (6h:25m:03s); 2. (Finland) Henri Toivonen (6h:28m:44s); 3. (Finland) Markku Alén (6h:36m:20s)	1. Ford Escort RS1800; 2. Chrysler Avenger; 3. Fiat 131 Abarth
(Sweden) Swedish Rally	10–12 February	Manufacturers; Drivers	1. (Sweden) Björn Waldegård (6h:42m:40s); 2. (Finland) Hannu Mikkola (6h:44m:08s); 3. (Finland) Markku Alén (6h:45m:26s)	1. Ford Escort RS1800; 2. Ford Escort RS1800; 3. Fiat 131 Abarth
(Kenya) Safari Rally	23–27 March	Manufacturers; Drivers	1. (France) Jean-Pierre Nicolas (+8m:18s penalties); 2. (Kenya) Vic Preston Jr (+8m:55s penalties); 3. (Finland) Rauno Aaltonen (+9m:10s penalties)	1. Peugeot 504 V6 Coupé; 2. Porsche 911; 3. Datsun 160J
Rallye de Portugal	19–23 April	Manufacturers; Drivers	1. (Finland) Markku Alén (7h:45m:33s); 2. (Finland) Hannu Mikkola (7h:50m:01s); 3. (France) Jean-Pierre Nicolas (8h:01m:01s)	1. Fiat 131 Abarth; 2. Ford Escort RS1800; 3. Ford Escort RS1800
Acropolis Rally Greece	29 May–2 June	Manufacturers; Drivers	1. (West Germany) Walter Röhrl (10h:00m:50s); 2. (Finland) Markku Alén (10h:10m:54s); 3. (Kenya) Shekhar Mehta (10h:23m:36s)	1. Fiat 131 Abarth; 2. Fiat 131 Abarth; 3. Datsun 160J
(Scotland) Scottish Rally	3–7 June	Drivers	1. (Finland) Hannu Mikkola (4h:26m:38s); 2. (Finland) Pentti Airikkala (4h:34m:36s); 3. (United Kingdom) Roger Clark (4h:35m:11s)	1. Ford Escort RS1800; 2. Vauxhall Chevette 2300 HS; 3. Ford Escort RS1800
(Poland) Rajd Polski	6–9 July	Drivers	1. (Spain) Antonio Zanini (5h:51m:01.2s); 2. (Austria) Franz Wittmann (6h:04m:10.9s); 3. (Spain) Salvador Cañellas (6h:09m:04.8s)	1. Fiat 131 Abarth; 2. Opel Kadett GT/E; 3. Fiat 131 Abarth
(Finland) 1000 Lakes Rally	25–27 August	Manufacturers; Drivers	1. (Finland) Markku Alén (3h:30m:10s); 2. (Finland) Timo Salonen (3h:32m:14s); 3. (Finland) Pentti Airikkala (3h:32m:50s)	1. Fiat 131 Abarth; 2. Fiat 131 Abarth; 3. Vauxhall Chevette 2300 HS
Rally New Zealand	2–5 September	Drivers	1. (United Kingdom) Russell Brookes (9h:57m:12.0s); 2. (New Zealand) Jim Donald (10h:09m:29.4s); 3. (New Zealand) Paul Adams (10h:41m:55.8s)	1. Ford Escort RS1800; 2. Ford Escort RS1800; 3. Ford Escort RS1800
(Canada) Critérium du Québec	13–17 September	Manufacturers; Drivers	1. (West Germany) Walter Röhrl (4h:54m:23s); 2. (Finland) Markku Alén (5h:02m:56s); 3. (Sweden) Anders Kulläng (5h:12m:46s)	1. Fiat 131 Abarth; 2. Fiat 131 Abarth; 3. Opel Kadett GT/E
Tour de France Automobile	16–21 September	Drivers	1. (France) Michèle Mouton (11h:18m:15.7s); 2. (France) Jean-Louis Clarr (11h:34m:01.8s); 3. (United Kingdom) Chris Sclater (11h:40m:04.0s)	1. Fiat 131 Abarth; 2. Opel Kadett GT/E; 3. Vauxhall Chevette 2300 HS
(Italy) Rallye Sanremo	3–7 October	Manufacturers; Drivers	1. (Finland) Markku Alén (10h:53m:28s); 2. (Italy) Maurizio Verini (11h:04m:00s); 3. (France) Francis Vincent (11h:10m:31s)	1. Lancia Stratos HF; 2. Fiat 131 Abarth; 3. Porsche 911
(Australia) Southern Cross Rally	14–18 October	Drivers	1. (Australia) George Fury (1h:25m:17s); 2. (Australia) Colin Bond (1h:37m:12s); 3. (Australia) Wayne Bell (1h:58m:32s)	1. Datsun Stanza; 2. Ford Escort RS1800; 3. Holden Gemini
(Spain) Rallye de España	20–22 October	Drivers	1. (Italy) Tony Carello (4h:20m:03s); 2. (Spain) Beny Fernández (4h:29m:40); 3. (Spain) Jorge de Bagration (4h:33m:27s)	1. Lancia Stratos HF; 2. Fiat 131 Abarth; 3. Lancia Stratos HF
(Ivory Coast) Rallye Côte d'Ivoire	21–24 October	Manufacturers; Drivers	1. (France) Jean-Pierre Nicolas (+2m:28s penalties); 2. (Finland) Timo Mäkinen (+2m:43s penalties); 3. (France) Jean Ragnotti (+3m:50s penalties)	1. Peugeot 504 V6 Coupé; 2. Peugeot 504 V6 Coupé; 3. Renault 5 Alpine
(France) Tour de Corse	4–5 November	Manufacturers; Drivers	1. (France) Bernard Darniche (6h:47m:34s); 2. (France) Jean-Claude Andruet (6h:51m:59s); 3. (Italy) Sandro Munari (6h:52m:59s)	1. Fiat 131 Abarth; 2. Fiat 131 Abarth; 3. Fiat 131 Abarth
(United Kingdom) RAC Rally	19–23 November	Manufacturers; Drivers	1. (Finland) Hannu Mikkola (8:47m:23s); 2. (Sweden) Björn Waldegård (8h:52m:41s); 3. (United Kingdom) Russell Brookes (8h:58m:55s)	1. Ford Escort RS1800; 2. Ford Escort RS1800; 3. Ford Escort RS1800

== Standings ==
=== Manufacturers' championship ===
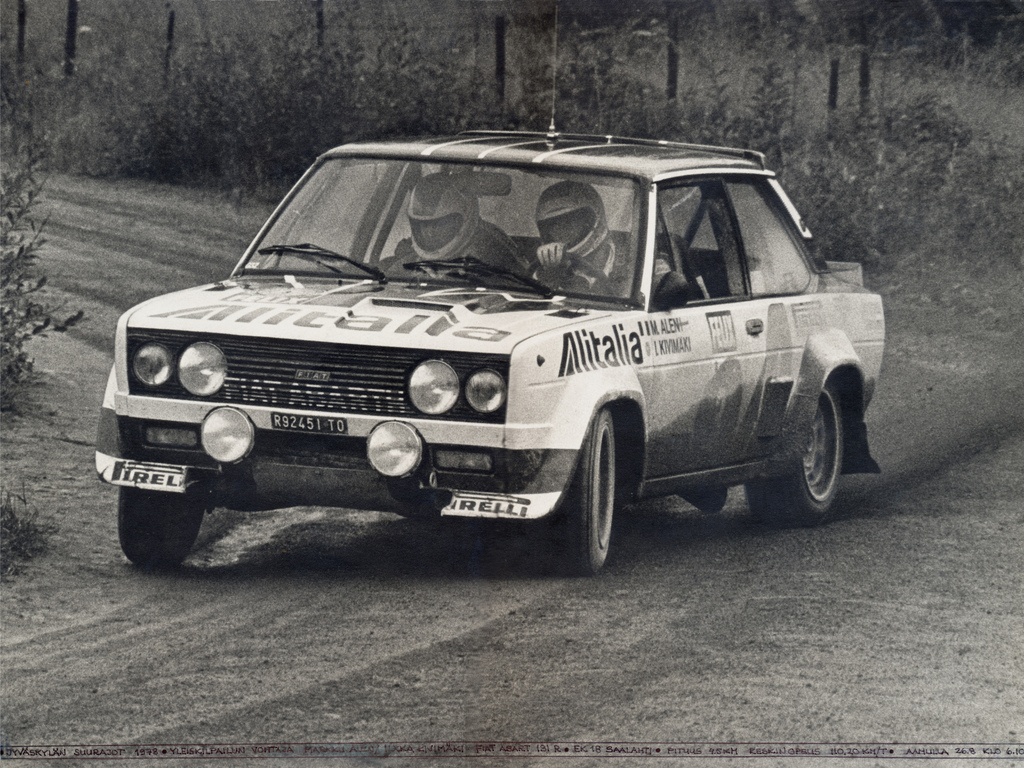
Markku Alén drives a Fiat 131 Abarth at the 1000 Lakes Rally.

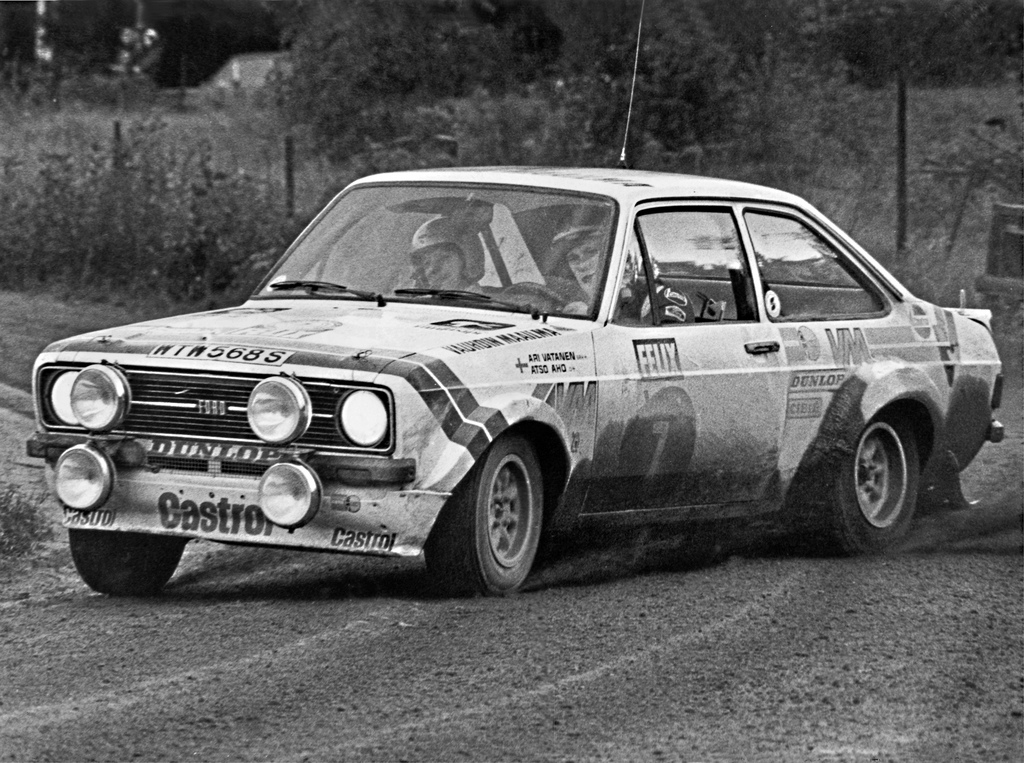
Ari Vatanen with a Ford Escort RS1800 at the 1000 Lakes

Pos.	Manufacturer	(Monaco) MON	(Sweden) SWE	(Kenya) KEN	(Portugal) POR	(Greece) GRC	(Finland) FIN	(Canada) CAN	(Italy) ITA	(Ivory Coast) CIV	(France) FRA	(United Kingdom) GBR	Points
1	(Italy) Fiat	14	14	-	18	18	18	18	16	-	18	(9)	134
2	(United States) Ford	-	18	7	16	9	6	13	13	-	-	18	100
3	(Germany) Opel	(10)	12	-	13	12	11	16	10	-	12	14	100
4	(Germany) Porsche	18	-	16	7	-	12	-	14	-	12	-	79
5	(Japan) Datsun	-	-	16	-	16	-	-	-	10	-	10	52
6	(Japan) Toyota	-	-	-	15	8	13	14	-	-	-	-	50
7	(Italy) Lancia	8	12	-	-	11	-	-	18	-	-	-	49
8	(France) Peugeot	-	-	18	9	-	-	-	-	18	-	-	45
9	(France) Renault	17	-	-	-	-	-	-	-	16	-	-	33
10	(United Kingdom) British Leyland Cars	-	-	-	-	-	-	12	-	-	-	12	24
11	(Sweden) Saab	-	8	-	-	-	-	10	-	-	-	-	18
12	(Germany) Volkswagen	-	9	-	-	-	-	8	-	-	-	-	17
13	(Japan) Mitsubishi	-	-	5	-	-	-	-	-	11	-	-	16
14	(United Kingdom) Vauxhall	-	-	-	-	-	14	-	-	-	-	-	14
14	(Italy) Alfa Romeo	-	-	-	-	-	-	-	14	-	-	-	14
16	(Germany) Mercedes	-	-	12	-	-	-	-	-	-	-	-	12
17	(Sweden) Volvo	-	10	-	-	-	-	-	-	-	-	-	10
18	(United States) Chrysler	-	-	-	-	-	-	-	-	-	-	8	8
19	(Czechoslovakia) Škoda	-	-	-	-	6	-	-	-	-	-	-	6
20	(France) Alpine-Renault	-	-	-	-	-	-	-	-	-	5	-	5
21	(Soviet Union) Lada	-	-	-	-	4	-	-	-	-	-	-	4
Pos.	Manufacturer	(Monaco) MON	(Sweden) SWE	(Kenya) KEN	(Portugal) POR	(Greece) GRC	(Finland) FIN	(Canada) CAN	(Italy) ITA	(Ivory Coast) CIV	(France) FRA	(United Kingdom) GBR	Points

=== FIA Cup for Drivers ===
Pos.	Driver	(Monaco) MON	(Finland) ARC	(Sweden) SWE	(Kenya) KEN	(Portugal) POR	(Greece) GRC	(Scotland) SCO	(Poland) POL	(Finland) FIN	(New Zealand) NZL	(Canada) CAN	(France) TDF	(Italy) ITA	(Italy) GIR	(Australia) AUS	(Spain) ESP	(Ivory Coast) CIV	(France) FRA	(United Kingdom) GBR	Points
1	(Finland) Markku Alén	-	4	(4)	-	9	6	0	-	9	-	6	-	9	9	-	-	-	-	0	52
2	(France) Jean-Pierre Nicolas	9	-	-	9	4	0	-	-	-	-	-	0	-	-	-	-	9	0	0	31
3	(Finland) Hannu Mikkola	-	-	6	-	6	-	9	-	0	-	-	-	-	-	-	-	-	-	9	30
4	(France) Michèle Mouton	0	-	-	-	-	-	-	-	-	-	-	9	-	3	-	-	-	2	-	14
5	(United Kingdom) Russell Brookes	-	-	-	-	-	-	0	-	-	9	-	-	-	-	-	-	-	-	4	13
6	(West Germany) Walter Röhrl	3	-	-	-	0	(9)	-	-	-	-	9	-	0	-	-	-	-	-	1	13
7	(France) Bernard Darniche	2	-	-	-	0	-	-	-	-	-	-	0	-	-	-	-	-	9	-	11
8	(Finland) Ari Vatanen	-	9	2	-	0	-	-	-	0	-	-	-	-	-	-	-	-	-	0	11
9	(France) Jean Ragnotti	6	-	-	-	-	-	-	-	-	-	-	0	-	-	-	-	4	-	-	10
10	(Finland) Pentti Airikkala	-	-	0	-	-	-	6	-	4	-	-	-	-	-	-	-	-	-	0	10
Pos.	Driver	(Monaco) MON	(Finland) ARC	(Sweden) SWE	(Kenya) KEN	(Portugal) POR	(Greece) GRC	(Scotland) SCO	(Poland) POL	(Finland) FIN	(New Zealand) NZL	(Canada) CAN	(France) TDF	(Italy) ITA	(Italy) GIR	(Australia) AUS	(Spain) ESP	(Ivory Coast) CIV	(France) FRA	(United Kingdom) GBR	Points

== Pointscoring systems ==
=== Manufacturers' championship ===
Overall finish	Group finish									
Overall finish	1	2	3	4	5	6	7	8	9	10
1	18	-	-	-	-	-	-	-	-	-
2	17	16	-	-	-	-	-	-	-	-
3	16	15	14	-	-	-	-	-	-	-
4	15	14	13	12	-	-	-	-	-	-
5	14	13	12	11	10	-	-	-	-	-
6	13	12	11	10	9	8	-	-	-	-
7	12	11	10	9	8	7	6	-	-	-
8	11	10	9	8	7	6	5	4	-	-
9	10	9	8	7	6	5	4	3	2	-
10	9	8	7	6	5	4	3	2	1	1

== See also ==
- 1978 in sports
