= Critérium du Québec =

The Critérium du Québec (also known as the Rally of Canada) was a rally competition that was part of the World Rally Championship from 1977 to 1979. Critérium du Québec was Canada's second WRC event after the Rally of the Rideau Lakes, which was part of the calendar in 1974.

== History ==
The 5ème Critérium Molson du Québec was the first edition of the rally on the World Rally Championship schedule. Fiat took a double win with its 131 Abarth both in 1977 and 1978, first with Timo Salonen and Simo Lampinen and a year later with Walter Röhrl and Markku Alén. The 1979 event, won by Björn Waldegård in a Ford Escort RS1800, was the rally's final appearance in the WRC.

== Winners ==
Season	Winner	Car
1977	(Finland) Timo Salonen	Fiat 131 Abarth
1978	(West Germany) Walter Röhrl	Fiat 131 Abarth
1979	(Sweden) Björn Waldegård	Ford Escort RS1800
