= Fulvio Bacchelli =

Italian rally driver (born 1951)

Personal information
- Nationality: (Italy) Italian
- Born: 22 January 1951 (age 75); Trieste

World Rally Championship record
- Years active: 1973 – 1982
- Co-driver: (Italy) Francesco Rossetti (Italy) Bruno Scabini (Italy) Arnaldo Bernacchini (Italy) Paolo Spollon
- Teams: Fiat
- Rallies: 16
- Championships: 0
- Rally wins: 1
- Podiums: 2
- Stage wins: 15
- Total points: 0
- First rally: 1973 Rallye Sanremo
- First win: 1977 Rally New Zealand
- Last rally: 1982 Rallye Sanremo

Fulvio Bacchelli (born 22 January 1951 in Trieste) is a former Italian rally driver, who won the 1987 Monza Rally Show, and the 1977 Rally New Zealand, a round of the World Rally Championship.

== Career ==
Bacchelli began rallying in 1971. In 1974, he joined the works Fiat team, finishing sixth on that year's Tour de Corse. He finished fourth in the 1975 Monte Carlo Rally. He was gaining a reputation as a "fast but erratic" driver. In 1977, he won Rally New Zealand, or the South Pacific Rally as it was then known, in his Fiat 131 Abarth. At the end of the year, Fiat and Lancia's rally departments merged and he lost his factory drive.

== WRC victories ==
#	Event	Season	Co-driver	Car
1	(New Zealand) 8th South Pacific Rally	1977	Francesco Rossetti	Fiat 131 Abarth
