= Timo Salonen =

Finnish rally driver (born 1951)

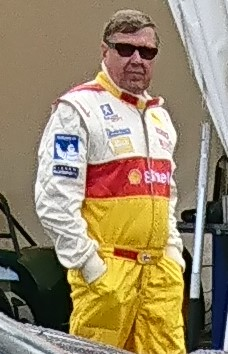
- Salonen in 2017

Personal information
- Nationality: (Finland) Finnish
- Full name: Timo Olavi Salonen
- Born: 8 October 1951 (age 75); Helsinki, Finland

World Rally Championship record
- Years active: 1974 – 1992, 2002
- Co-driver: (Finland) Seppo Harjanne (Finland) Jaakko Markkula (Finland) Erkki Nyman (South Africa) Stuart Pegg (Finland) Voitto Silander (Finland) Launo Heinonen
- Teams: Fiat, Datsun, Nissan, Peugeot, Mazda, Mitsubishi
- Rallies: 95
- Championships: 1 (1985)
- Rally wins: 11
- Podiums: 24
- Stage wins: 256
- Total points: 524
- First rally: 1974 1000 Lakes Rally
- First win: 1977 Rally Canada
- Last win: 1987 Swedish Rally
- Last rally: 2002 Neste Rally Finland

Timo Olavi Salonen (born 8 October 1951) is a Finnish former rally driver who won the 1985 World Rally Championship season for Peugeot. It was commented of him that he stood out from other drivers, because he was overweight, wore thick glasses and smoked heavily, but still remained one of the fastest and most competitive drivers in the sport. He was also known for his relaxed attitude and for his habit of steering his rally car with one hand only. These factors led to the nickname Löysä ("Slack"). With his 11 rally wins he remained the most successful driver of Group B era (1983–1986) of WRC.

== Rallying career ==
=== WRC career (1975–2002) ===
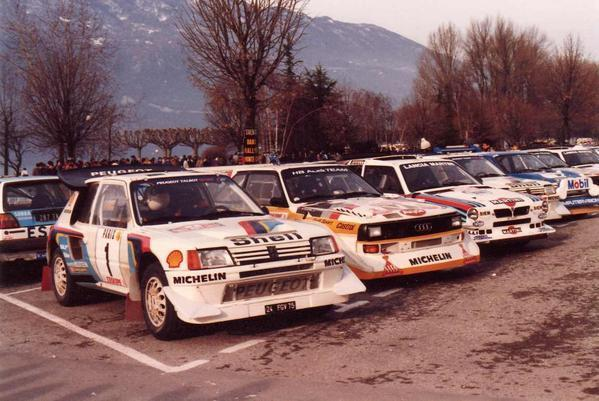
Salonen's Peugeot 205 T16 E2 at the 1986 Monte Carlo Rally

Salonen achieved his first podium place in the World Rally Championship by driving his Fiat 131 Abarth to second place at the 1977 1000 Lakes Rally. He went on to win the next rally, the 1977 Critérium du Québec, which was only his fifth WRC event and his first outside his home country.

Salonen's factory team career at World Championship level began with Nissan, mainly on long-distance events. In 1984, however, he achieved a string of top-ten finishes, resulting in Jean Todt inviting him to drive for Peugeot in the 1985 season. He began that year playing a supporting role to Ari Vatanen but quickly proved capable of being in a leading role, especially after Vatanen's near-fatal accident in Argentina. Salonen set a record by winning four world rallies in a row – unmatched and unbroken until Sébastien Loeb's six wins in a row in 2005 – and went on to win the World Championship with a record 52-point margin ahead of second-placed Stig Blomqvist. Salonen then remained at Peugeot for the 1986 season, and finished third in the drivers' championship, behind his new team-mate Juha Kankkunen and Lancia driver Markku Alén.

Salonen has remained the most successful driver of Group B with his seven rally wins and one World Rally Championship.

In the turbulent world of post-Group B rallying, Salonen starred for Mazda, taking a popular win on the 1987 Swedish Rally. His last WRC event in action was the 1992 Rally Portugal in a Mitsubishi Galant VR-4 until he made a one-time comeback at the 2002 Neste Rally Finland. He managed his Peugeot 206 WRC to 14th place overall.

Salonen was mainly co-driven by Seppo Harjanne, who would later go on to achieve even more success with Tommi Mäkinen (the pairing of Tommi Mäkinen and Seppo Harjanne achieved 2 championship titles from 1996 to 1997 by 1 point until Harjanne was replaced by Risto Mannisenmäki from 1998 to 2001). After retiring from rallying, Salonen has worked as the CEO for his car sales company Autotalo Timo Salonen in Finland.

=== Rally Raid career (1992–1995) ===
Following his full-time WRC career, Salonen drove for Guy Fréquelin's Citroën rally raid team. During the 1992 Paris-Moscow-Beijing rally raid, Salonen's ZX burnt to the ground.

In 1993, Salonen then competed regularly for the squad, winning the 1993 Pharaohs Rally Raid in the works ZX and helping the team win the Cross-Country World Cup manufacturers' title. That same season, Salonen also finished fourth on the Baja Aragon Raid, second on the Atlas Rally Raid and third on the United Arab Emirates Desert Challenge. He would withdraw from the 1993 Paris-Dakar rally, however, when co-driver Fred Gallagher (co-driver) injured his back after a heavy landing.

For the following season, Salonen could not compete in 1994's Paris-Dakar-Paris. Citroën and the event organisers disagreed about the running of the event, the French marque entering a reduced squad of just two ZXs in protest. He did still drive for the team during the World Cup, finishing second on the Tunisia Rally Raid, following a penultimate stage crash that robbed him of the win, taking the victory on the Baja Aragón and providing a test drive for Top Gear (1977 TV series)'s Jeremy Clarkson.

In the 1995 Granda-Dakar rally, Salonen finished fifth, after losing over five hours when his ZX lost drive to its front wheels. Salonen also finished third on the Atlas Rally that season and second on the Baja España-Aragón.

== Complete WRC results ==
Year	Entrant	Car	1	2	3	4	5	6	7	8	9	10	11	12	13	14	WRC	Points
1974	Timo Salonen	Mazda 1300	MON; C	SWE; C	POR	KEN	GRE; C	FIN; 22	ITA	CAN	USA	GBR	FRA				-	-
1975	Timo Salonen	Datsun 160J	MON	SWE	KEN	GRC	MOR	POR	FIN; 6	ITA	FRA	GBR					-	-
1976	Timo Salonen	Datsun 160J	MON	SWE	POR	KEN	GRC	MOR	FIN; 6	ITA	FRA	GBR					-	-
1977	Timo Salonen	Fiat 131 Abarth	MON	SWE	POR	KEN	NZL	GRC	FIN; 2	CAN; 1	ITA	FRA	GBR; Ret				-	-
1978	Alitalia Fiat	Fiat 131 Abarth	MON	SWE; Ret	KEN	POR	GRE	FIN; 2	CAN; Ret	ITA	CIV	FRA	GBR				-	-
1979	N.I. Theocharakis	Datsun 160J	MON	SWE	POR	KEN	GRC; 2										4th	50
1979	Team Datsun Europe	Datsun 160J						NZL; DSQ	FIN; 5	CAN; 2	ITA; Ret	FRA	GBR; 3	CIV			4th	50
1980	Team Datsun Europe	Datsun 160J	MON	SWE; 7	POR; Ret	KEN	GRE; 2	ARG	FIN; 6	NZL; 1	ITA; Ret	FRA; Ret	GBR; Ret	CIV			7th	45
1981	Team Datsun Europe	Datsun Violet GT/160J	MON	SWE	POR; Ret		FRA; Ret	GRE; Ret	ARG; Ret	BRA	FIN; 4	ITA; 12	CIV; 1	GBR; Ret			6th	40
1981	Team Datsun Europe	Datsun Silvia				KEN; 4											6th	40
1982	Team Nissan Europe	Nissan Silvia/Datsun Violet GTS	MON	SWE	POR; Ret	KEN; Ret	FRA	GRE; Ret	NZL; 4	BRA	FIN; 4	ITA	CIV				11th	20
1982	Team Nissan Europe	Datsun/Nissan Violet GT												GBR; Ret			11th	20
1983	Team Nissan Europe	Nissan 240 RS	MON; 14	SWE	POR; Ret	KEN; Ret	FRA	GRE; Ret	NZL; 2	ARG	FIN; 8	ITA	CIV	GBR; Ret			13th	18
1984	Team Nissan Europe	Nissan 240 RS	MON; 10	SWE	POR	KEN; 7	FRA	GRE; 6	NZL; 4	ARG	FIN	ITA	CIV	GBR; 6			10th	27
1985	Shell Peugeot Talbot Sport	Peugeot 205 Turbo 16	MON; 3	SWE; 3	POR; 1	KEN; 7	FRA; Ret										1st	143
1985	Shell Peugeot Talbot Sport	Peugeot 205 Turbo 16 E2						GRE; 1	NZL; 1	ARG; 1	FIN; 1	ITA; 2	CIV	GBR; Ret			1st	143
1986	Shell Peugeot Talbot Sport	Peugeot 205 Turbo 16 E2	MON; 2	SWE; Ret	POR; Ret	KEN	FRA; Ret	GRE; Ret	NZL; 5	ARG	FIN; 1	CIV	ITA	GBR; 1	USA		3rd	63
1987	Mazda Rally Team Europe	Mazda 323 4WD	MON; Ret	SWE; 1	POR; Ret	KEN	FRA	GRE	USA	NZL	ARG	FIN; Ret	CIV	ITA	GBR		14th	20
1988	Mazda Rally Team Europe	Mazda 323 4WD	MON; 5	SWE; Ret	POR	KEN	FRA	GRE; Ret	USA	NZL	ARG	FIN; 4	CIV	ITA	GBR; 2		5th	33
1989	Mazda Rally Team Europe	Mazda 323 4WD	SWE; 22	MON; Ret	POR	KEN	FRA	GRE	NZL	ARG	FIN; 2	AUS	ITA	CIV	GBR; 6		12th	21
1990	Mazda Rally Team Europe	Mazda 323 4WD	MON; 8	POR; Ret	KEN	FRA	GRE	NZL	ARG								25th	9
1990	Mazda Rally Team Europe	Mazda 323 GT-X								FIN; 6	AUS	ITA	CIV	GBR; Ret			25th	9
1991	Mitsubishi Ralliart Europe	Mitsubishi Galant VR-4	MON; 8	SWE; Ret	POR	KEN	FRA	GRE; Ret	NZL	ARG	FIN; DSQ	AUS; 5	ITA	CIV	ESP	GBR; 4	13th	21
1992	Mitsubishi Ralliart Europe	Mitsubishi Galant VR-4	MON; 6	SWE	POR; 5	KEN	FRA	GRE	NZL	ARG	FIN	AUS	ITA	CIV	ESP	GBR	20th	14
2002	Timo Salonen	Peugeot 206 WRC	MON	SWE	FRA	ESP	CYP	ARG	GRE	KEN	FIN; 14	GER	ITA	NZL	AUS	GBR	-	0

== WRC victories ==
Number	Event	Season	Co-driver	Car
1	(Canada) 5ème Critérium Molson du Québec	1977	Jaakko Markkula	Fiat 131 Abarth
2	11th Motogard Rally of New Zealand	1980	Seppo Harjanne	Datsun 160J
3	(Ivory Coast) 13ème Rallye Côte d'Ivoire	1981	Seppo Harjanne	Datsun Violet GT
4	19º Rallye de Portugal Vinho do Porto	1985	Seppo Harjanne	Peugeot 205 Turbo 16
5	(Greece) 32nd Acropolis Rally	1985	Seppo Harjanne	Peugeot 205 Turbo 16 E2
6	15th AWA Clarion Rally of New Zealand	1985	Seppo Harjanne	Peugeot 205 Turbo 16 E2
7	5º Marlboro Rally Argentina	1985	Seppo Harjanne	Peugeot 205 Turbo 16 E2
8	(Finland) 35th 1000 Lakes Rally	1985	Seppo Harjanne	Peugeot 205 Turbo 16 E2
9	(Finland) 36th 1000 Lakes Rally	1986	Seppo Harjanne	Peugeot 205 Turbo 16 E2
10	(United Kingdom) 35th Lombard RAC Rally	1986	Seppo Harjanne	Peugeot 205 Turbo 16 E2
11	(Sweden) 37th International Swedish Rally	1987	Seppo Harjanne	Mazda 323 4WD

Awards and achievements
Preceded by Ari Vatanen	Autosport; International Rally Driver Award; 1985	Succeeded by Juha Kankkunen
Sporting positions
Preceded by Stig Blomqvist	World Rally Champion; 1985	Succeeded by Juha Kankkunen
Preceded by Stig Blomqvist	Race of Champions; Rally Master; 1994	Succeeded by Andrea Aghini
