= 1979 World Rally Championship =

7th season of the World Rally Championship series

Champions
- World Drivers' Champion: Björn Waldegård
- World Manufacturers' Champion: Ford

Seasons
- ← 1978 1980 →

The 1979 World Rally Championship was the seventh season of the Fédération Internationale de l'Automobile (FIA) World Rally Championship (WRC). The season consisted of 12 rallies, one more than the previous year.

1979 marked the first season for the new World Rally Championship for Drivers. This successor to the preceding FIA Cup for Rally Drivers was aligned with the World Rally Championship for Manufacturers. Both championships used the same schedule of events for accumulating points toward the titles, although the point awarding methods were different for each. Manufacturers continued to receive points under the system adopted in 1977, in which points were garnered for both placement overall and placement within the car's group. Only the top finishing car from each manufacturer would garner points, and regardless of group finish, an overall finish of 10th or better was required to obtain points. Drivers were awarded points on the former system, simply based on overall finish, from 20 points for 1st place to 1 point for 10th place.

After several years of competitive but ultimately unsuccessful attempts to seize the championship, Ford finally gathered its first WRC manufacturer's title. A strong season which included five rally wins gave it the edge over new challenger Datsun, whose 160J (Violet) proved successful, and former champion Fiat. Ford's fortune would be short-lived however, and despite determined and competitive participation in WRC events, 1979 would be the company's sole WRC title until their return to victory in 2006.

The competition for the first WRC driver's title was extremely close, and ultimately was decided by the two contenders placing first and second in the final rally of the season. The final difference between the winner, Swede Björn Waldegård, and the runner-up, Finn Hannu Mikkola, was only a single point.

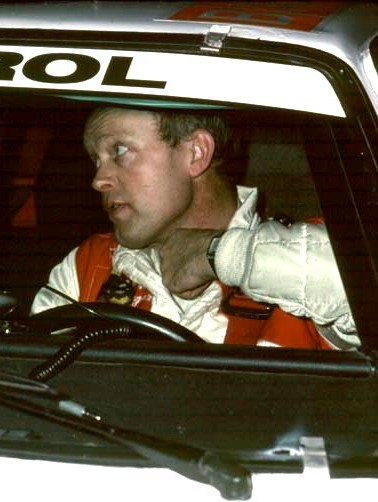
Björn Waldegård won the inaugural WRC drivers' championship.

== Calendar ==
Rd.	Start date	Finish date	Rally	Rally headquarters	Surface	Stages	Distance
1	20 January	26 January	(Monaco) 47th Rallye Automobile Monte-Carlo	Monte Carlo	Mixed	30	619 km
2	16 February	18 February	(Sweden) 29th International Swedish Rally	Karlstad, Värmland County	Snow	38	630 km
3	6 March	11 March	13th Rallye de Portugal - Vinho do Porto	Estoril, Lisbon	Mixed	45	737.5 km
4	12 April	16 April	(Kenya) 27th Safari Rally	Nairobi	Gravel	N/A	5027 km
5	28 May	31 May	(Greece) 26th Acropolis Rally	Athens	Gravel	58	1006.5 km
6	14 July	18 July	10th Motogard Rally of New Zealand	Auckland	Gravel	42	658 km
7	24 August	28 August	(Finland) 29th Jyväskylän Suurajot - Rally of the 1000 Lakes	Jyväskylä, Central Finland	Gravel	47	423.5 km
8	13 September	16 September	(Canada) 7th Critérium Molson du Québec	Montreal	Mixed	32	503.7 km
9	1 October	7 October	(Italy) 21st Rallye Sanremo	Sanremo, Liguria	Mixed	74	962 km
10	2 November	4 November	23rd Tour de Corse - Rallye de France	Ajaccio, Corsica	Tarmac	22	1128.9 km
11	18 November	21 November	(United Kingdom) 35th Lombard RAC Rally	Chester	Gravel	59	661.48 km
12	9 December	14 December	(Ivory Coast) 11th Rallye Bandama Côte d'Ivoire	Abidjan	Gravel	N/A	5622 km

This was the only season that all rounds counted towards the Manufacturers championship until 1993.

== Events ==
1979 World Rally Championship event map
Black = Tarmac	Brown = Gravel	Blue = Snow/Ice	Red = Mixed Surface

1979 World Rally Championship schedule and results
Round	Rally name	Stages	Podium finishers					
Round	Rally name	Stages	Rank	Driver	Co-driver	Team	Car	Time
1	(Monaco) Rallye Automobile Monte Carlo (20 January–26 January)	30 stages 619 km Tarmac	1	(France) Bernard Darniche	(France) Alain Mahé	(France) Team Chardonnet	Lancia Stratos HF	8:13.38
1	(Monaco) Rallye Automobile Monte Carlo (20 January–26 January)	30 stages 619 km Tarmac	2	(Sweden) Björn Waldegård	(Sweden) Hans Thorszelius	(United States) Ford Motor Company	Ford Escort RS1800	8:13.44
1	(Monaco) Rallye Automobile Monte Carlo (20 January–26 January)	30 stages 619 km Tarmac	3	(Finland) Markku Alén	(Finland) Ilkka Kivimäki	(Italy) Alitalia Fiat	Fiat 131 Abarth	8:17.47
2	(Sweden) Swedish Rally (16 February–18 February)	38 stages 630 km Snow/Ice	1	(Sweden) Stig Blomqvist	(Sweden) Björn Cederberg		Saab 99 Turbo	6:34.49
2	(Sweden) Swedish Rally (16 February–18 February)	38 stages 630 km Snow/Ice	2	(Sweden) Björn Waldegård	(Sweden) Hans Thorszelius	(United States) Ford Motor Company	Ford Escort RS1800	6:36.09
2	(Sweden) Swedish Rally (16 February–18 February)	38 stages 630 km Snow/Ice	3	(Finland) Pentti Airikkala	(Finland) Risto Virtanen		Vauxhall Chevette 2300 HS	6:39.31
3	Rallye de Portugal (6 March–11 March)	45 stages 735 km Tarmac/Gravel	1	(Finland) Hannu Mikkola	(Sweden) Arne Hertz	(United States) Ford Motor Company	Ford Escort RS1800	9:13.52
3	Rallye de Portugal (6 March–11 March)	45 stages 735 km Tarmac/Gravel	2	(Sweden) Björn Waldegård	(Sweden) Hans Thorszelius	(United States) Ford Motor Company	Ford Escort RS1800	9:16.36
3	Rallye de Portugal (6 March–11 March)	45 stages 735 km Tarmac/Gravel	3	(Sweden) Ove Andersson	(United Kingdom) Henry Liddon	(West Germany) Toyota Team Europe	Toyota Celica 2000GT	9:35.00
4	(Kenya) Safari Rally (April 12–16)	82 controls 5028 km Gravel	1	(Kenya) Shekhar Mehta	(Kenya) Mike Doughty	(Kenya) DT Dobie Team Datsun	Datsun 160J	+6:27 pen
4	(Kenya) Safari Rally (April 12–16)	82 controls 5028 km Gravel	2	(Finland) Hannu Mikkola	(Sweden) Arne Hertz	(Kenya) DT Dobie Daimler-Benz	Mercedes 450 SLC 5.0	+7:15 pen
4	(Kenya) Safari Rally (April 12–16)	82 controls 5028 km Gravel	3	(Finland) Markku Alén	(Finland) Ilkka Kivimäki	(Italy) Alitalia Fiat	Fiat 131 Abarth	+7:20 pen
5	(Greece) Acropolis Rally (May 28–31)	54 stages 1008 km Gravel/Tarmac	1	(Sweden) Björn Waldegård	(Sweden) Hans Thorszelius	(United Kingdom) Rothmans Rally Team	Ford Escort RS1800	13:35.06
5	(Greece) Acropolis Rally (May 28–31)	54 stages 1008 km Gravel/Tarmac	2	(Finland) Timo Salonen	(Finland) Seppo Harjanne	(Greece) N. I. Theocharakis	Datsun 160J	14:07.04
5	(Greece) Acropolis Rally (May 28–31)	54 stages 1008 km Gravel/Tarmac	3	(Sweden) Harry Källström	(Sweden) Claes Billstam	(Greece) N. I. Theocharakis	Datsun 160J	14:11.39
6	Rally New Zealand (14 July–18 July)	42 stages 672 km Tarmac/Gravel	1	(Finland) Hannu Mikkola	(Sweden) Arne Hertz	(New Zealand) Masport	Ford Escort RS1800	8:05.45,8
6	Rally New Zealand (14 July–18 July)	42 stages 672 km Tarmac/Gravel	2	(New Zealand) Blair Robson	(New Zealand) Chris Porter	(New Zealand) Masport	Ford Escort RS1800	8:27.03,0
6	Rally New Zealand (14 July–18 July)	42 stages 672 km Tarmac/Gravel	3	(Finland) Ari Vatanen	(United Kingdom) David Richards	(United States) Ford Motor Company	Ford Escort RS1800	8:29.40,8
7	(Finland) 1000 Lakes Rally (24 August–28 August)	45 stages 424 km Gravel	1	(Finland) Markku Alén	(Finland) Ilkka Kivimäki	(Italy) Alitalia Fiat	Fiat 131 Abarth	4:01.11
7	(Finland) 1000 Lakes Rally (24 August–28 August)	45 stages 424 km Gravel	2	(Finland) Ari Vatanen	(United Kingdom) David Richards	(United Kingdom) Rothmans Rally Team	Ford Escort RS1800	4:02.42
7	(Finland) 1000 Lakes Rally (24 August–28 August)	45 stages 424 km Gravel	3	(Sweden) Björn Waldegård	(Sweden) Hans Thorszelius	(United States) Ford Motor Company	Ford Escort RS1800	4:07.15
8	(Canada) Critérium du Québec (13 September–16 September)	25 stages 384 km Tarmac/Gravel	1	(Sweden) Björn Waldegård	(Sweden) Hans Thorszelius	(United States) Ford Motor Company	Ford Escort RS1800	3:35.32
8	(Canada) Critérium du Québec (13 September–16 September)	25 stages 384 km Tarmac/Gravel	2	(Finland) Timo Salonen	(Finland) Seppo Harjanne	(Japan) Team Datsun Europe	Datsun 160J	3:36.10
8	(Canada) Critérium du Québec (13 September–16 September)	25 stages 384 km Tarmac/Gravel	3	(Finland) Ari Vatanen	(United Kingdom) David Richards	(United Kingdom) Rothmans Rally Team	Ford Escort RS1800	3:41.50
9	(Italy) Rallye Sanremo (1 October–7 October)	66 stages 1078 km Tarmac/Gravel	1	(Italy) Antonio 'Tony' Fassina	(Italy) Mauro Mannini	(Italy) Jolly Club	Lancia Stratos HF	12:37.17
9	(Italy) Rallye Sanremo (1 October–7 October)	66 stages 1078 km Tarmac/Gravel	2	(West Germany) Walter Röhrl	(West Germany) Christian Geistdörfer	(Italy) Alitalia Fiat	Fiat 131 Abarth	12:41.31
9	(Italy) Rallye Sanremo (1 October–7 October)	66 stages 1078 km Tarmac/Gravel	3	(Italy) Attilio Bettega	(Italy) Maurizio Perissinot		Fiat 131 Abarth	12:55.59
10	(France) Tour de Corse (2 November–4 November)	22 stages 1129 km Tarmac	1	(France) Bernard Darniche	(France) Alain Mahé	(France) Team Chardonnet	Lancia Stratos HF	14:36.46
10	(France) Tour de Corse (2 November–4 November)	22 stages 1129 km Tarmac	2	(France) Jean Ragnotti	(France) Jean-Marc Andrié		Renault 5 Alpine	15:12.52
10	(France) Tour de Corse (2 November–4 November)	22 stages 1129 km Tarmac	3	(France) Pierre-Louis Moreau	(France) Patrice Baron		Porsche 911 SC	15:23.06
11	(United Kingdom) RAC Rally (19 November–23 November)	56 stages 687 km Gravel/Tarmac	1	(Finland) Hannu Mikkola	(Sweden) Arne Hertz	(United States) Ford Motor Company	Ford Escort RS1800	8:03.38
11	(United Kingdom) RAC Rally (19 November–23 November)	56 stages 687 km Gravel/Tarmac	2	(United Kingdom) Russell Brookes	(United Kingdom) Paul White	(United Kingdom) Andrews Heat For Hire	Ford Escort RS1800	8:14.07
11	(United Kingdom) RAC Rally (19 November–23 November)	56 stages 687 km Gravel/Tarmac	3	(Finland) Timo Salonen	(South Africa) Stuart Pegg	(Japan) Team Datsun Europe	Datsun 160J	8:16.22
12	(Ivory Coast) Rallye Côte d'Ivoire (9 December–14 December)	50 controls 5668 km Gravel	1	(Finland) Hannu Mikkola	(Sweden) Arne Hertz		Mercedes 450 SLC 5.0	+3:23 pen
12	(Ivory Coast) Rallye Côte d'Ivoire (9 December–14 December)	50 controls 5668 km Gravel	2	(Sweden) Björn Waldegård	(Sweden) Hans Thorszelius		Mercedes 450 SLC 5.0	+3:58 pen
12	(Ivory Coast) Rallye Côte d'Ivoire (9 December–14 December)	50 controls 5668 km Gravel	3	(United Kingdom) Andrew Cowan	(West Germany) Klaus Kaiser		Mercedes 450 SLC 5.0	+4:10 pen

== Championship for manufacturers ==
1979 World Rally Championship for Manufacturers
Rank	Manufacturer	Event												Total points
Rank	Manufacturer	(Monaco) MON	(Sweden) SWE	(Portugal) POR	(Kenya) KEN	(Greece) GRC	(New Zealand) NZL	(Finland) FIN	(Canada) CAN	(Italy) ITA	(France) FRA	(United Kingdom) GBR	(Ivory Coast) CIV	Total points
1	(United Kingdom) Ford	16	16	18	-	18	18	(16)	18	(12)	-	18	-	122
2	(Japan) Datsun	-	(8)	14	18	17	(6)	14	17	-	-	16	12	108
3	(Italy) Fiat	14	12	-	15	-	-	18	-	16	12	5	-	92
4	(Italy) Lancia	18	-	-	-	-	-	-	-	18	18	11	-	65
5	(Japan) Toyota	-	-	16	-	-	-	10	12	-	10	-	10	58
6	(Germany) Opel	-	13	9	-	-	-	-	-	14	13	-	-	49
7	(France) Renault	11	-	-	-	13	-	-	-	-	17	-	-	41
8	(Germany) Mercedes	-	-	-	17	-	-	-	-	-	-	-	18	35
9	(Germany) Porsche	8	-	-	-	-	-	-	-	9	15	-	-	32
10	(United Kingdom) Vauxhall	-	14	-	-	-	10	-	-	-	-	7	-	31
11	(France) Peugeot	-	-	-	-	-	-	-	8	-	6	-	8	22
12	(Sweden) Saab	-	18	-	-	-	-	-	-	-	-	-	-	18
13	(Japan) Mitsubishi	-	-	-	-	-	-	-	13	-	-	-	-	13
14	(United Kingdom) Talbot	-	-	-	-	-	-	-	-	12	-	-	-	12
15	(Germany) Audi	-	-	11	-	-	-	-	-	-	-	-	-	11
16	(Japan) Mazda	-	-	-	-	-	10	-	-	-	-	-	-	10
17	(United Kingdom) Triumph	-	-	-	-	-	-	7	-	-	-	-	-	7
18	(Sweden) Volvo	-	6	-	-	-	-	-	-	-	-	-	-	6
18	(Czechoslovakia) Škoda	-	-	-	-	6	-	-	-	-	-	-	-	6
20	(Soviet Union) Lada	-	-	-	-	4	-	-	-	-	-	-	-	4

1979 World Rally Championship point awards for manufacturers
Overall finish	Group finish									
Overall finish	1	2	3	4	5	6	7	8	9	10
1	18	-	-	-	-	-	-	-	-	-
2	17	16	-	-	-	-	-	-	-	-
3	16	15	14	-	-	-	-	-	-	-
4	15	14	13	12	-	-	-	-	-	-
5	14	13	12	11	10	-	-	-	-	-
6	13	12	11	10	9	8	-	-	-	-
7	12	11	10	9	8	7	6	-	-	-
8	11	10	9	8	7	6	5	4	-	-
9	10	9	8	7	6	5	4	3	2	-
10	9	8	7	6	5	4	3	2	1	1

== Championship for drivers ==
1979 World Rally Championship for Drivers
Rank	Driver	Event												Total points
Rank	Driver	(Monaco) MON	(Sweden) SWE	(Portugal) POR	(Kenya) KEN	(Greece) GRC	(New Zealand) NZL	(Finland) FIN	(Canada) CAN	(Italy) ITA	(France) FRA	(United Kingdom) GBR	(Ivory Coast) CIV	Total points
1	(Sweden) Björn Waldegård	15	15	15	(6)	20	-	12	20	-	-	(2)	15	112
2	(Finland) Hannu Mikkola	8	8	20	15	-	20	-	-	-	-	20	20	111
3	(Finland) Markku Alén	12	10	-	12	-	-	20	-	6	-	8	-	68
4	(Finland) Timo Salonen	-	-	-	-	15	-	8	15	-	-	12	-	50
4	(Finland) Ari Vatanen	1	-	-	-	-	12	15	12	-	-	10	-	50
6	(France) Bernard Darniche	20	-	-	-	-	-	-	-	-	20	-	-	40
7	(France) Jean Ragnotti	-	-	-	-	10	-	-	-	-	15	-	-	25
8	(United Kingdom) Andrew Cowan	-	-	-	10	-	-	-	-	-	-	-	12	22
9	(West Germany) Walter Röhrl	-	-	-	3	-	-	-	-	15	-	3	-	21
10	(Sweden) Stig Blomqvist	-	20	-	-	-	-	-	-	-	-	-	-	20
10	(Kenya) Shekhar Mehta	-	-	-	20	-	-	-	-	-	-	-	-	20
10	(Italy) Antonio 'Tony' Fassina	-	-	-	-	-	-	-	-	20	-	-	-	20
13	(Sweden) Ove Andersson	-	-	12	-	-	-	-	-	-	-	-	8	20
14	(United Kingdom) Andy Dawson	-	-	10	-	-	-	-	10	-	-	-	-	20
15	(Finland) Pentti Airikkala	-	12	-	-	-	-	-	-	-	-	4	-	16
16	(New Zealand) Blair Robson	-	-	-	-	-	15	-	-	-	-	-	-	15
16	(United Kingdom) Russell Brookes	-	-	-	-	-	-	-	-	-	-	15	-	15
18	(Sweden) Harry Källström	-	-	-	2	12	-	-	-	-	-	-	-	14
19	(Italy) Attilio Bettega	-	-	-	-	-	-	-	-	12	-	-	-	12
19	(France) Pierre-Louis Moreau	-	-	-	-	-	-	-	-	-	12	-	-	12
21	(France) Michèle Mouton	4	-	-	-	-	-	-	-	-	8	-	-	12
22	(France) Jean-Claude Andruet	10	-	-	-	-	-	-	-	-	-	-	-	10
22	(New Zealand) Paul Adams	-	-	-	-	-	10	-	-	-	-	-	-	10
22	(Finland) Ulf Grönholm	-	-	-	-	-	-	10	-	-	-	-	-	10
22	(United Kingdom) Tony Pond	-	-	-	-	-	-	-	-	10	-	-	-	10
22	(France) Alain Coppier	-	-	-	-	-	-	-	-	-	10	-	-	10
22	(Kenya) Vic Preston, Jr.	-	-	-	-	-	-	-	-	-	-	-	10	10
28	(Portugal) Carlos Torres	-	-	8	-	-	-	-	-	-	-	-	-	10
28	(Finland) Rauno Aaltonen	-	-	-	8	-	-	-	-	-	-	-	-	8
28	(Greece) Anastasios 'Iaveris' Markouizos	-	-	-	-	8	-	-	-	-	-	-	-	8
28	(New Zealand) Shane Murland	-	-	-	-	-	8	-	-	-	-	-	-	8
28	(Canada) Taisto Heinonen	-	-	-	-	-	-	-	8	-	-	-	-	8
28	(Italy) Dario Cerrato	-	-	-	-	-	-	-	-	8	-	-	-	8
34	(France) Jean-Pierre Nicolas	6	-	-	-	-	-	-	-	-	-	-	-	6
34	(Sweden) Björn Johansson	-	6	-	-	-	-	-	-	-	-	-	-	6
34	(West Germany) Harald Demuth	-	-	6	-	-	-	-	-	-	-	-	-	6
34	(Greece) Iórgos Moschous	-	-	-	-	6	-	-	-	-	-	-	-	6
34	(New Zealand) David Parkes	-	-	-	-	-	6	-	-	-	-	-	-	6
34	(Finland) Lasse Lampi	-	-	-	-	-	-	6	-	-	-	-	-	6
34	(United States) Hendrik Blok	-	-	-	-	-	-	-	6	-	-	-	-	6
34	(France) Bernard Picone	-	-	-	-	-	-	-	-	-	6	-	-	6
34	(United Kingdom) John Taylor	-	-	-	-	-	-	-	-	-	-	6	-	6
34	(France) Alain Ambrosino	-	-	-	-	-	-	-	-	-	-	-	6	6
44	(Sweden) Ola Strömberg	-	4	-	-	-	-	-	-	-	-	-	-	4
44	(Sweden) Freddy Kottulinsky	-	-	4	-	-	-	-	-	-	-	-	-	4
44	(Kenya) Mike Kirkland	-	-	-	4	-	-	-	-	-	-	-	-	4
44	(Greece) Evangelos Gallo	-	-	-	-	4	-	-	-	-	-	-	-	4
44	(New Zealand) Brian Green	-	-	-	-	-	4	-	-	-	-	-	-	4
44	(Finland) Tapio Rainio	-	-	-	-	-	-	4	-	-	-	-	-	4
44	(Canada) Jack Swayze	-	-	-	-	-	-	-	4	-	-	-	-	4
44	(Italy) Angelo Presotto	-	-	-	-	-	-	-	-	4	-	-	-	4
44	(France) Paul Rouby	-	-	-	-	-	-	-	-	-	4	-	-	4
44	(France) Michel Mitri	-	-	-	-	-	-	-	-	-	-	-	4	4
54	(France) Guy Fréquelin	3	-	-	-	-	-	-	-	-	-	-	-	3
54	(Sweden) Lars Carlsson	-	3	-	-	-	-	-	-	-	-	-	-	3
54	(Portugal) Joaquim Santos	-	-	3	-	-	-	-	-	-	-	-	-	3
54	(Czech Republic) Václav Blahna	-	-	-	-	3	-	-	-	-	-	-	-	3
54	(New Zealand) Roger Goss	-	-	-	-	-	3	-	-	-	-	-	-	3
54	(Sweden) Per Eklund	-	-	-	-	-	-	3	-	-	-	-	-	3
54	(France) Claude Laurent	-	-	-	-	-	-	-	3	-	-	-	-	3
54	(Italy) Antonio Tognana	-	-	-	-	-	-	-	-	3	-	-	-	3
54	(France) Jean-Pierre Mari	-	-	-	-	-	-	-	-	-	3	-	-	3
54	(France) Jean-Pierre Paure	-	-	-	-	-	-	-	-	-	-	-	3	3
64	(France) Jacques Alméras	2	-	-	-	-	-	-	-	-	-	-	-	2
64	(Norway) John Haugland	-	2	-	-	-	-	-	-	-	-	-	-	2
64	(Portugal) Jorge Ortigão	-	-	2	-	-	-	-	-	-	-	-	-	2
64	(Soviet Union) Nikolay Elizarov	-	-	-	-	2	-	-	-	-	-	-	-	2
64	(New Zealand) Malcolm Stewart	-	-	-	-	-	2	-	-	-	-	-	-	2
64	(Finland) Erkki Pitkänen	-	-	-	-	-	-	2	-	-	-	-	-	2
64	(Canada) Nicole Quimet	-	-	-	-	-	-	-	2	-	-	-	-	2
64	(Italy) Domenico 'Nico' Grosoli	-	-	-	-	-	-	-	-	2	-	-	-	2
64	(France) Jean Bondrille	-	-	-	-	-	-	-	-	-	2	-	-	2
73	(Sweden) Sven-Inge Neby	-	1	-	-	-	-	-	-	-	-	-	-	1
73	(Portugal) Marques Baptista	-	-	1	-	-	-	-	-	-	-	-	-	1
73	(Italy) Sandro Munari	-	-	-	1	-	-	-	-	-	-	-	-	1
73	(Soviet Union) Sergey Vukovich	-	-	-	-	1	-	-	-	-	-	-	-	1
73	(New Zealand) Bob Robb	-	-	-	-	-	1	-	-	-	-	-	-	1
73	(Finland) Pekka Vilpponen	-	-	-	-	-	-	1	-	-	-	-	-	1
73	(Canada) Paul Bourgeois	-	-	-	-	-	-	-	1	-	-	-	-	1
73	(Italy) Paolo Pasutti	-	-	-	-	-	-	-	-	1	-	-	-	1
73	(France) Jean-Charles Martinetti	-	-	-	-	-	-	-	-	-	1	-	-	1
73	(Australia) Greg Carr	-	-	-	-	-	-	-	-	-	-	1	-	1

1979 World Rally Championship point awards for drivers
Points awarded by finish	1st	2nd	3rd	4th	5th	6th	7th	8th	9th	10th
Points awarded by finish	20	15	12	10	8	6	4	3	2	1

1979 driver points awarded by nationality
Rank	Country	Top ranked driver	Event												Total points
Rank	Country	Top ranked driver	(Monaco) MON	(Sweden) SWE	(Portugal) POR	(Kenya) KEN	(Greece) GRC	(New Zealand) NZL	(Finland) FIN	(Canada) CAN	(Italy) ITA	(France) FRA	(United Kingdom) GBR	(Ivory Coast) CIV	Total points
1	Finland	Hannu Mikkola	21	30	20	35	15	32	66	27	6	-	54	20	326
2	Sweden	Björn Waldegård	15	49	31	2	32	-	12	23	-	-	-	23	187
3	France	Bernard Darniche	45	-	-	-	10	-	-	3	-	81	-	13	152
4	United Kingdom	Andrew Cowan	-	-	10	10	-	-	-	10	10	-	21	12	73
5	Italy	Tony	-	-	-	1	-	-	-	-	48	-	-	-	48
6	New Zealand	Blair Robson	-	-	-	-	-	43	-	-	-	-	-	-	43
7	Kenya	Shekhar Mehta	-	-	-	24	-	-	-	-	-	-	-	10	34
8	West Germany	Walter Röhrl	-	-	6	3	-	-	-	-	15	-	3	-	27
9	Greece	Iaveris	-	-	-	-	18	-	-	-	-	-	-	-	18
10	Canada	Taisto Heinonen	-	-	-	-	-	-	-	15	-	-	-	-	15
11	Portugal	Carlos Torres	-	-	14	-	-	-	-	-	-	-	-	-	14
12	United States	Hendrik Blok	-	-	-	-	-	-	-	6	-	-	-	-	6
13	Czechoslovakia	Václav Blahna	-	-	-	-	3	-	-	-	-	-	-	-	3
14	Soviet Union	Nikolay Elizarov	-	-	-	-	3	-	-	-	-	-	-	-	3
15	Norway	John Haugland	-	2	-	-	-	-	-	-	-	-	-	-	2
16	Australia	Greg Carr	-	-	-	-	-	-	-	-	-	-	1	-	1

== Teams ==
1979 team performance
Team	Drivers	Cars	Performance Results			Points	
Team	Drivers	Cars	Entries	Finishes	Wins	Maker	Driver
(United Kingdom) Ford Motor Company	(Sweden) Björn Waldegård (Finland) Hannu Mikkola	Ford Escort RS1800	11	11	3	86	147
(Italy) Alitalia Fiat	(Sweden) (Finland) Markku Alén (Germany) Walter Röhrl (Italy) Sandro Munari	Fiat 131 Abarth	9	8	1	80	82
(Japan) Team Datsun Europe	(Finland) Timo Salonen (United Kingdom) Andy Dawson (Sweden) Harry Källström (Norway) John Haugland (Finland) Erkki Pitkänen	Datsun 160J	10	6	-	61	59
(France) Team Chardonnet	(France) Bernard Darniche	Lancia Stratos HF	4	2	2	36	40
(United Kingdom) Rothmans Rally Team	(Sweden) Björn Waldegård (Finland) Ari Vatanen	Ford Escort RS1800; Ford Fiesta	9	5	1	34	66
(Germany) Toyota Team Europe	(Sweden) Ove Andersson	Toyota Celica 2000GT	9	2	-	26	20
(New Zealand) Masport	(Finland) Hannu Mikkola (New Zealand) Blair Robson	Ford Escort RS1800	3	2	1	18	35
(Kenya) DT Dobie Team Datsun	(Kenya) Shekhar Mehta (Sweden) Harry Källström (Finland) Rauno Aaltonen (Kenya) Mike Kirkland	Datsun 160J	4	4	1	18	34
(Italy) Jolly Club	(Italy) Tony	Lancia Stratos HF	1	1	1	18	20
(Greece) N. I. Theocharakis	(Finland) Timo Salonen (Sweden) Harry Källström (Greece) Iórgos Moschous (Greece) Evangelos Gallo	Datsun 160J	4	4	-	17	37
(Kenya) DT Dobie Daimler-Benz	(Finland) Hannu Mikkola (United Kingdom) Andrew Cowan (Sweden) Björn Waldegård	Mercedes 450 SLC 5.0; Mercedes 280 E	5	3	-	17	31
(Italy) Conrero	(Italy) Dario Cerrato	Opel Ascona B	1	1	-	14	8
(France) Renault Elf Calberson	(France) Jean Ragnotti	Renault 5 Alpine	1	1	-	13	10
Fiat France	(France) Michèle Mouton (France) Jean-Claude Andruet	Fiat 131 Abarth	2	2	-	12	14
(Germany) Audi Motorsport	(Germany) Harald Demuth (Sweden) Freddy Kottulinsky (Austria) Franz Wittmann	Audi 80 GLE	10	7	-	11	10
(United Kingdom) Lancia GB	(Finland) Markku Alén	Lancia Stratos HF	1	1	-	11	8
(Portugal) Team Lopes Correia	(Portugal) Joaquim Santos (Portugal) Joaquim Moutinho	Opel Kadett GT/E	2	1	-	9	3
(United Kingdom) Dealer Team Vauxhall	(Finland) Pentti Airikkala	Vauxhall Chevette 2300 HS	1	1	-	7	4
(Poland) Biamar	(Czechoslovakia) Václav Blahna	Škoda 130RS	2	1	-	6	3
(Soviet Union) Autoexport Moskva	(Soviet Union) Nikolay Elizarov (Soviet Union) Sergey Vukovich	Lada 21011	3	2	-	4	3
(Australia) Nylex	(New Zealand) Paul Adams	Ford Escort RS1800	2	1	-	-	10
Ford Australia	(Australia) Greg Carr	Ford Escort RS1800	1	1	-	-	1
(United Kingdom) British Leyland Cars	(Sweden) Per Eklund (United Kingdom) Graham Elsmore (Finland) Simo Lampinen	Triumph TR 7 V8	4	3	-	-	-
(Kenya) Marshalls	(France) Jean-Claude Lefèbvre	Peugeot 504 V6 Coupé	4	1	-	-	-
(Poland) FSO	(Poland) Andrzej Jaroszewicz	FSO Polonez 2000	2	1	-	-	-
(Portugal) Aleuropa	(Portugal) Vítor Oliveira	Opel 1204 SL	1	1	-	-	-
Fiat Kenya	(Kenya) Robin Ulyate	Fiat 131 Abarth	1	1	-	-	-
(Greece) Kassidopoulos	(Greece) Manolis Halivelakis	Toyota Corolla	1	1	-	-	-
(United Kingdom) Toyota Team Great Britain	(Finland) Tapio Rainio	Toyota Celica 2000GT	1	1	-	-	-
(Netherlands) Opel Dealer Team Holland	(Sweden) Anders Kulläng	Opel Kadett GT/E	5	-	-	-	-
GM Dealer Team New Zealand	(Finland) Pentti Airikkala	Vauxhall Chevette 2300 HS	1	-	-	-	-
GM Portugal	(Portugal) Mêquêpê	Vauxhall Chevette 2300 HS	1	-	-	-	-
Opel France	(France) Jean-Louis Clarr	Opel Kadett GT/E	1	-	-	-	-
(Sweden) Saab Scania	(Sweden) Stig Blomqvist (Sweden) Ola Strömberg	Saab 99 Turbo	2	-	-	-	-
Talbot France	(France) Jean-Pierre Nicolas	Talbot Sunbeam Lotus	1	-	-	-	-

== See also ==
- 1979 in sports
