= 1977 World Rally Championship =

5th season of the World Rally Championship

Champions
- FIA Cup for Drivers Champion: Sandro Munari
- World Manufacturers' Champion: Fiat

Seasons
- ← 1976 1978 →

The 1977 World Rally Championship was the fifth season of the Fédération Internationale de l'Automobile (FIA) World Rally Championship (WRC). The schedule was expanded by one event to 11, with some changes to the locations visited. Morocco was dropped from the schedule while new rallies were introduced in Quebec and New Zealand.

Due to internal politics within the company, Lancia failed to mount a significant effort to capture a fourth consecutive Championship. Instead, corporate partner Fiat led the fight against Ford, ultimately triumphing in a tightly contested battle that lasted most of the year.

From 1973 to 1978, the WRC only awarded a championship for manufacturers. Scoring was modified in 1977 to a more complex system including points both for overall and group placement. A car would still have to place in the overall top 10 to score points.

In addition to the Championship for Manufacturers, the FIA began awarding the FIA Cup for Rally Drivers. A total of 20 events were part of this series, including all rallies of the WRC, the five coefficient 4 rallies from the European Championship and four FIA Special Events. Only the best 8 results were counted towards the title: five WRC rallies, two ERC rallies and one Special Event.

== Calendar ==
| Rd. | Start date | Finish date | Rally | Rally headquarters | Surface | Stages | Distance | Points |
|---|---|---|---|---|---|---|---|---|
| 1 | 22 January | 28 January | (Monaco) 45th Rallye Automobile Monte-Carlo | Monte Carlo | Mixed | 27 | 540.5 km | Drivers & Manufacturers |
| 2 | 4 February | 6 February | (Finland) 12th Marlboro Arctic Rally | Rovaniemi, Lapland | Snow | 43 | 500 km | Cup for Drivers |
| 3 | 11 February | 13 February | (Sweden) 27th International Swedish Rally | Karlstad, Värmland County | Snow | 35 | 704.2 km | Drivers & Manufacturers |
| 4 | 1 March | 6 March | 11th Rallye de Portugal - Vinho do Porto | Estoril, Lisbon | Mixed | 46 | 584.6 km | Drivers & Manufacturers |
| 5 | 7 April | 11 April | (Kenya) 25th Safari Rally | Nairobi | Gravel | N/A | 5999.17 km | Drivers & Manufacturers |
| 6 | 1 May | 7 May | 8th South Pacific Rally - New Zealand | Auckland | Mixed | 75 | 2211.06 km | Drivers & Manufacturers |
| 7 | 28 May | 3 June | (Greece) 24th Acropolis Rally | Athens | Gravel | 52 | 763.08 km | Drivers & Manufacturers |
| 8 | 12 June | 17 June | (Italy) 5th Giro d'Italia | Torino | Tarmac | ?? | 452 km | Cup for Drivers |
| 9 | 5 July | 9 July | 20th Total Rally South Africa | Pretoria | Mixed | ?? | 2450 km | Cup for Drivers |
| 10 | 8 July | 10 July | (Poland) 37th Rajd Polski | Wroclaw | Mixed | 53 | 512.8 km | Cup for Drivers |
| 11 | 26 August | 28 August | (Finland) 27th Jyväskylän Suurajot - Rally of the 1000 Lakes | Jyväskylä, Central Finland | Gravel | 46 | 452.9 km | Drivers & Manufacturers |
| 12 | 2 September | 4 September | (Italy) 14th Rally San Martino di Castrozza | San Martino di Castrozza | Mixed | 10 | 160 km | Cup for Drivers |
| 13 | 14 September | 18 September | (Canada) 5th Critérium Molson du Québec | Montreal | Mixed | 17 | 536.4 km | Drivers & Manufacturers |
| 14 | 15 September | 24 September | 36th Tour de France Automobile | Nice | Mixed | 28 | 1244.11 km | Cup for Drivers |
| 15 | 4 October | 8 October | (Italy) 15th Rallye Sanremo | Sanremo, Liguria | Mixed | 33 | 867.35 km | Drivers & Manufacturers |
| 16 | 8 October | 12 October | (Australia) 12th Total Oil Southern Cross International Rally | Sydney | Mixed | 35 | 1498.62 km | Cup for Drivers |
| 17 | 23 October | 23 October | (Spain) 25th RACE Rallye de España | Circuito del Jarama | Mixed | 27 | 481 km | Cup for Drivers |
| 18 | 5 November | 6 November | 21st Tour de Corse - Rallye de France | Ajaccio, Corsica | Tarmac | 13 | 645.8 km | Drivers & Manufacturers |
| 19 | 20 November | 24 November | (United Kingdom) 33rd Lombard RAC Rally | York | Gravel | 69 | 674.45 km | Drivers & Manufacturers |
| 20 | 15 December | 20 December | (Ivory Coast) 10th Rallye Bandama Côte d'Ivoire | Abidjan | Gravel | N/A | ?? | Cup for Drivers |

Rounds that were only part of the FIA Cup for Rally Drivers are not officially recognised as WRC events.

== Events ==
=== Map ===
1977 World Rally Championship event map
| Black = Tarmac | Brown = Gravel | Blue = Snow/Ice | Red = Mixed Surface |

=== Schedule and results ===
1977 World Rally Championship schedule and results
| Rally | | Dates run | Podium Drivers (Finishing Time) | Podium Cars |
|---|---|---|---|---|
| (Monaco) Rallye Monte-Carlo | | 22–28 January | 1. (Italy) Sandro Munari (6h:36m:13s); 2. (France) Jean-Claude Andruet (6h:38m:29s); 3. (Spain) Antonio Zanini (6h:47m:07s) | 1. Lancia Stratos HF; 2. Fiat 131 Abarth; 3. Seat 124D Especial 1800 |
| (Sweden) Swedish Rally | | 11–13 February | 1. (Sweden) Stig Blomqvist (8h:02m:17s); 2. (Sweden) Bror Danielsson (8h:08m:19s); 3. (Sweden) Anders Kulläng (8h:08m:32s) | 1. Saab 99 EMS; 2. Opel Kadett GT/E; 3. Opel Kadett GT/E |
| Rallye de Portugal | | 1–6 March | 1. (Finland) Markku Alén (6h:51m:47s); 2. (Sweden) Björn Waldegård (6h:55m:43s); 3. (Sweden) Ove Andersson (6h:56m:08s) | 1. Fiat 131 Abarth; 2. Ford Escort RS1800; 3. Toyota Celica 2000GT |
| (Kenya) Safari Rally | | 7–11 April | 1. (Sweden) Björn Waldegård (+11m:05s penalties); 2. (Finland) Rauno Aaltonen (+11m:40s penalties); 3. (Italy) Sandro Munari (+13m:14s penalties) | 1. Ford Escort RS1800; 2. Datsun 160J; 3. Lancia Stratos HF |
| (New Zealand) South Pacific Rally | Report | 1–7 May | 1. (Italy) Fulvio Bacchelli (24h:29m:55s); 2. (Finland) Ari Vatanen (24h:31m:29s); 3. (Finland) Markku Alén (24h:51m:54s) | 1. Fiat 131 Abarth; 2. Ford Escort RS1800; 3. Fiat 131 Abarth |
| (Greece) Acropolis Rally | | 28 May–3 June | 1. (Sweden) Björn Waldegård (9h:31m:57s); 2. (United Kingdom) Roger Clark (9h:37m:44s); 3. (Sweden) Harry Källström (9h:47m:19s) | 1. Ford Escort RS1800; 2. Ford Escort RS1800; 3. Datsun 160J |
| (Finland) 1000 Lakes Rally | | 26–28 August | 1. (Finland) Kyösti Hämäläinen (4h:26m:06s); 2. (Finland) Timo Salonen (4h:30m:31s); 3. (Sweden) Björn Waldegård (4h:36m:22s) | 1. Ford Escort RS1800; 2. Fiat 131 Abarth; 3. Ford Escort RS1800 |
| (Canada) Critérium du Québec | | 14–18 September | 1. (Finland) Timo Salonen (5h:13m:54s); 2. (Finland) Simo Lampinen (5h:18m:31s); 3. (United Kingdom) Roger Clark (5h:20m:56s) | 1. Fiat 131 Abarth; 2. Fiat 131 Abarth; 3. Ford Escort RS1800 |
| (Italy) Rallye Sanremo | | 4–8 October | 1. (France) Jean Claude Andruet (10h:27m:43s); 2. (Italy) Maurizio Verini (10h:29m:40s); 3. (Italy) 'Tony' (10h:36m:30s) | 1. Fiat 131 Abarth; 2. Fiat 131 Abarth; 3. Fiat 131 Abarth |
| (France) Tour de Corse | | 5–6 November | 1. (France) Bernard Darniche (8h:13m:40s); 2. (Italy) Raffaele Pinto (8h:17m:07s); 3. (Italy) Fulvio Bacchelli (8h:24m:07s) | 1. Fiat 131 Abarth; 2. Lancia Stratos HF; 3. Fiat 131 Abarth |
| (United Kingdom) RAC Rally | | 20–24 November | 1. (Sweden) Björn Waldegård (8h:21m:26s); 2. (Finland) Hannu Mikkola (8h:23m:49s); 3. (United Kingdom) Russell Brookes (8h:31m:55s) | 1. Ford Escort RS1800; 2. Toyota Celica 2000GT; 3. Ford Escort RS1800 |

== Manufacturers' championship ==
| Pos. | Co-Driver | (Monaco) MON | (Sweden) SWE | (Portugal) POR | (Kenya) KEN | (New Zealand) NZL | (Greece) GRC | (Finland) FIN | (Italy) ITA | (Canada) CAN | (France) FRA | (United Kingdom) GBR | Points |
|---|---|---|---|---|---|---|---|---|---|---|---|---|---|
| 1 | (Italy) Fiat | 16 | 14 | 18 | - | 18 | (12) | 16 | 18 | 18 | 18 | (6) | 136 |
| 2 | (United States) Ford | - | 14 | 16 | 18 | 16 | 18 | 18 | 14 | (10) | - | 18 | 132 |
| 3 | (Japan) Toyota | - | 10 | 14 | - | 8 | - | 12 | 8 | - | - | 16 | 68 |
| 4 | (Germany) Opel | 9 | 17 | 13 | - | - | 4 | 8 | - | 13 | - | 1 | 65 |
| 5 | (Italy) Lancia | 18 | - | - | 14 | - | - | - | - | 12 | 16 | - | 60 |
| 6 | (Japan) Datsun | - | - | - | 16 | - | 14 | - | 10 | - | - | - | 40 |
| 7 | (Germany) Porsche | 14 | - | 4 | - | - | - | - | - | 9 | 8 | - | 35 |
| 8 | (Sweden) Saab | - | 18 | - | - | - | - | - | 10 | - | - | 2 | 30 |
| 9 | (Japan) Mitsubishi | - | - | - | 12 | 3 | - | - | 13 | - | - | - | 28 |
| 10 | (United States) Chrysler | - | - | - | - | - | 10 | 14 | - | - | - | - | 24 |
| 11 | (France) Renault | - | - | - | - | - | 7 | - | - | 11 | - | - | 18 |
| 12 | (United Kingdom) British Leyland Cars | - | - | - | - | - | - | - | 12 | - | - | 4 | 16 |
| 13 | (France) Peugeot | - | - | - | 6 | - | - | - | - | - | 9 | - | 15 |
| 14 | (Spain) SEAT | 14 | - | - | - | - | - | - | - | - | - | - | 14 |
| 15 | (France) Citroën | - | - | - | - | - | 13 | - | - | - | - | - | 13 |
| 16= | (France) Alpine-Renault | 10 | - | - | - | - | - | - | - | - | - | - | 10 |
| 16= | (Japan) Mazda | - | - | - | - | 10 | - | - | - | - | - | - | 10 |
| 18 | (Sweden) Volvo | - | 8 | - | - | - | - | - | - | - | - | - | 8 |
| 19= | (Czechoslovakia) Škoda | - | - | - | - | - | - | 7 | - | - | - | - | 7 |
| 19= | (Italy) Alfa Romeo | - | - | - | - | - | - | - | - | 7 | - | - | 7 |
| 21 | (Soviet Union) Lada | - | 4 | - | - | - | - | - | - | - | - | - | 4 |
| Pos. | Co-Driver | (Monaco) MON | (Sweden) SWE | (Portugal) POR | (Kenya) KEN | (New Zealand) NZL | (Greece) GRC | (Finland) FIN | (Italy) ITA | (Canada) CAN | (France) FRA | (United Kingdom) GBR | Points |

1977 World Rally Championship point awards
| Overall finish | Group finish | | | | | | | | | |
| Overall finish | 1 | 2 | 3 | 4 | 5 | 6 | 7 | 8 | 9 | 10 |
|---|---|---|---|---|---|---|---|---|---|---|
| 1 | 18 | - | - | - | - | - | - | - | - | - |
| 2 | 17 | 16 | - | - | - | - | - | - | - | - |
| 3 | 16 | 15 | 14 | - | - | - | - | - | - | - |
| 4 | 15 | 14 | 13 | 12 | - | - | - | - | - | - |
| 5 | 14 | 13 | 12 | 11 | 10 | - | - | - | - | - |
| 6 | 13 | 12 | 11 | 10 | 9 | 8 | - | - | - | - |
| 7 | 12 | 11 | 10 | 9 | 8 | 7 | 6 | - | - | - |
| 8 | 11 | 10 | 9 | 8 | 7 | 6 | 5 | 4 | - | - |
| 9 | 10 | 9 | 8 | 7 | 6 | 5 | 4 | 3 | 2 | - |
| 10 | 9 | 8 | 7 | 6 | 5 | 4 | 3 | 2 | 1 | 1 |

== Cup for drivers ==
| Pos. | Driver | (Monaco) MON | (Finland) ARC | (Sweden) SWE | (Portugal) POR | (Kenya) KEN | (New Zealand) NZL | (Greece) GRC | (Italy) GIR | (South Africa) RSA | (Poland) POL | (Finland) FIN | (Italy) SMC | (Canada) CAN | (France) TDF | (Italy) ITA | (Australia) SCR | (Spain) ESP | (France) FRA | (United Kingdom) GBR | (Ivory Coast) CIV | Points |
|---|---|---|---|---|---|---|---|---|---|---|---|---|---|---|---|---|---|---|---|---|---|---|
| 1 | (Italy) Sandro Munari | 9 | - | - | - | 4 | - | - | - | 9 | - | - | 9 | - | - | - | - | - | - | - | - | 31 |
| 2 | (Sweden) Björn Waldegård | - | - | - | 6 | (9)^{[a]} | - | 9 | - | - | - | 4 | - | - | - | 2 | - | - | - | 9 | - | 30 |
| 3 | (France) Bernard Darniche | - | - | - | - | - | - | - | - | - | 9 | - | - | - | 9 | - | - | - | 9 | - | - | 27 |

European Rally Championship events
FIA Special Events

== Notes ==
- ^{a} Waldegård had to drop one of his best results in WRC events because he didn't take part in at least one ERC event, as provided by the regulations.

== See also ==
- 1977 in sports
