= Masport =

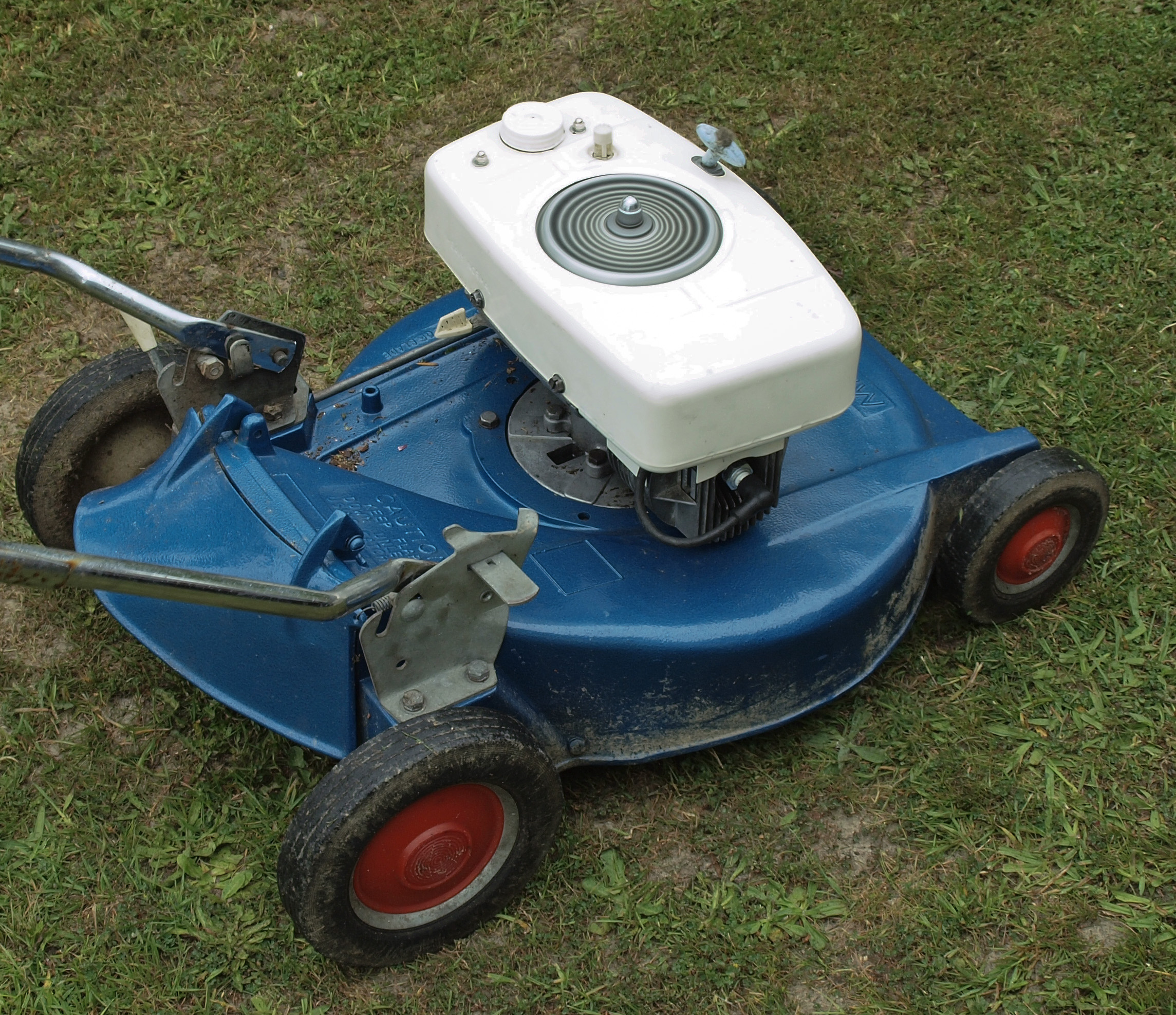
Masport Iron Horse Mower

Masport Limited is a Chinese-owned, New Zealand-based manufacturer specializing in outdoor power equipment and lifestyle products founded in 1910.

== History ==
In December 1910, Reuben Porter, Harold Mason, and Edwin Jones founded City Engineering Ltd in Auckland, New Zealand. The company initially produced vacuum pumps and stationary engines for agricultural equipment. in 1915 it was renamed to Mason and Porter Ltd. In 1930, Masport introduced its first hand-operated lawnmower, and in 1938, it developed New Zealand's first petrol-powered lawnmower.

During World War II, Masport contributed to the war effort by manufacturing munitions for the army. After the war, the company expanded its product line to include farm machinery such as ride-on tractors.

Since 1980s Masport was under the control of Brierley Investments and later was sold to a Goldman Sachs JBWere equity fund. Since July 2007, it was owned by Tom Sturgess. In January 2009 Sturgess bought from the JBWere-run Hauraki Private Equity No1 Fund several New Zealand brands, including Masport Foundries, and Masport Consumer. Masport Ltd. issued a press release stating that Masport Foundries is a completely unrelated business, although they have a common shareholder.

In 2017, Masport was acquired by AL-KO Gardentech, a subsidiary of the German AL-KO Group.

In 2025, AL-KO Gardentech, including Masport and Morrison, was acquired 100% by Chinese company Ningbo Daye Garden Machinery.

== Product range ==
Today, Masport's product range includes lawnmowers, shredders, cultivators, barbecues, and patio heaters.

== Awards and recognition ==
In 2023, Masport's petrol lawnmowers received the "People's Choice Award" from Consumer NZ, based on customer satisfaction and performance criteria, as well as several other customers' awards in various years.
