= Björn Waldegård =

Swedish rally driver (1943–2014)

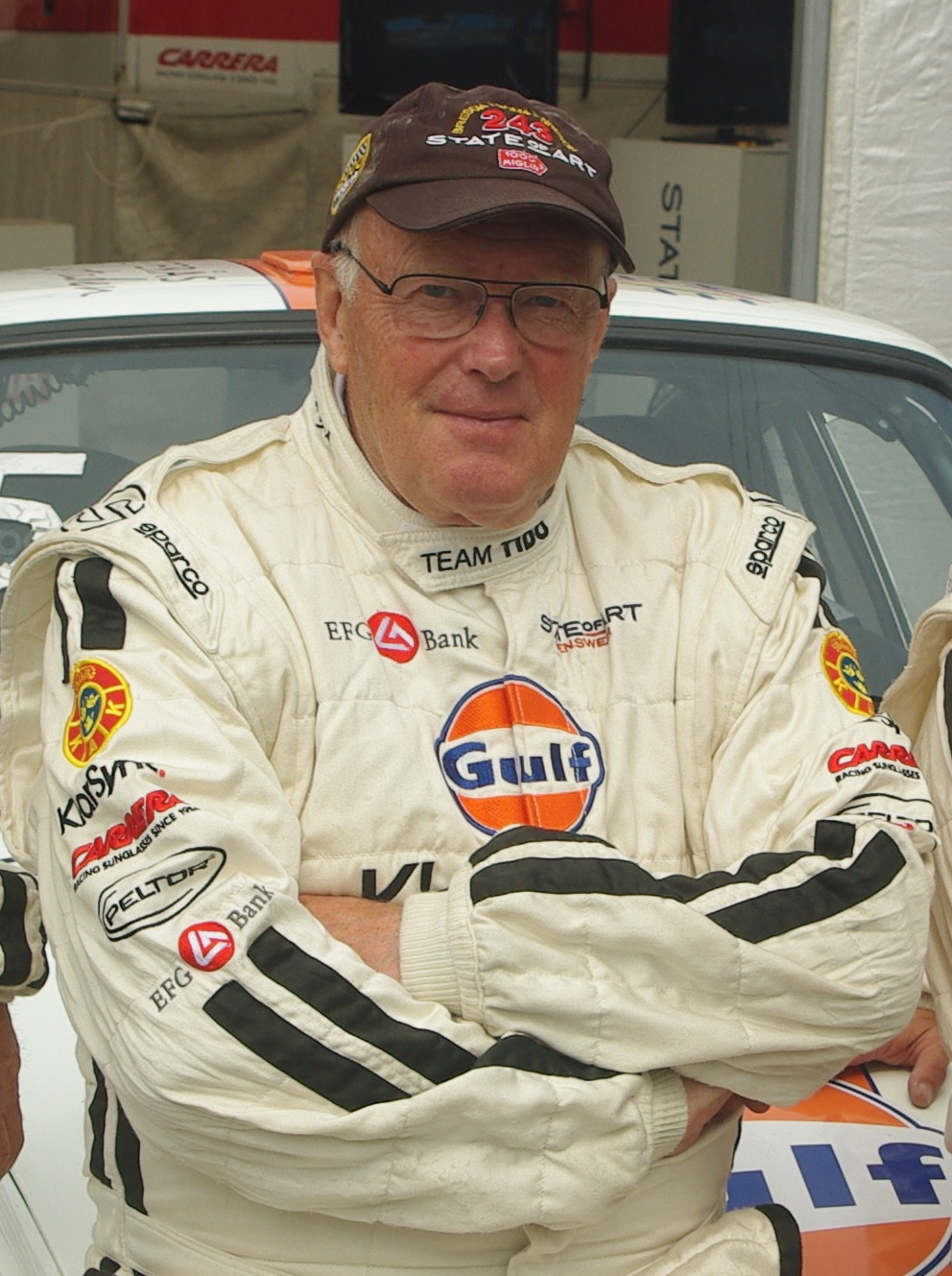
- Björn Waldegård during the Rally of the Midnight Sun in Västerås, Sweden in July 2011

Personal information
- Nationality: (Sweden) Swedish
- Full name: Björn Lars-Olov Waldegård
- Born: 12 November 1943; Solna, Sweden
- Died: 29 August 2014 (aged 70); Stockholm, Sweden

World Rally Championship record
- Years active: 1973–1992
- Co-driver: (Sweden) Hans Thorszelius (Sweden) Fergus Sager (Sweden) Arne Hertz (Sweden) Claes-Göran Andersson (Sweden) Claes Billstam (Sweden) Ragnar Spjuth (Belgium) Michel Lizin (United Kingdom) Fred Gallagher
- Teams: BMW, Toyota, Lancia, Ford, Mercedes-Benz, Fiat
- Rallies: 95
- Championships: 1 (1979)
- Rally wins: 16
- Podiums: 35
- Stage wins: 290
- Total points: 428
- First rally: 1973 Monte Carlo Rally
- First win: 1975 Swedish Rally
- Last win: 1990 Safari Rally
- Last rally: 1992 Safari Rally

Björn Lars-Olov Waldegård (12 November 1943 – 29 August 2014) was a Swedish rally driver, and the winner of the World Rally Championship for drivers in 1979. His Swedish nickname was "Walle".

== Career ==
Waldegård, who came from Rimbo, had a career that spanned four decades; he made his debut in 1962 and, after winning the Swedish Rally Championship in 1967 and '68, continued to compete at the top level until 1992 when a broken arm suffered during a crash in the 1992 Safari Rally forced his retirement. His first international victory, at the wheel of a Porsche 911, came on the 1969 Monte Carlo Rally, while his last came for Toyota on the 1990 Safari. It made him the oldest driver to win a World Rally Championship event, a record he retained until the 2022 Monte Carlo Rally.

In the mid-1970s, Waldegård took part in the newborn European Championship for Rallycross Drivers with a privately entered Porsche Carrera RSR. His best overall result was to become the Runner-up to Austrian Franz Wurz, father of Alexander Wurz, of the 1974 Embassy European Rallycross Championship.

The Alitalia-backed Lancia team of the 1970s frequently choose between star drivers Waldegård and Italian frontrunner Sandro Munari. Waldegård and Munari came head to head in the 1976 Rallye Sanremo. Waldegård had a four-second lead over Munari entering the final stage, only to be forced to squander that advantage in keeping with the team's hopes for an 'equal' shootout. Waldegård, however, emerged as victor by four seconds, having disobeyed team orders and overtaken Munari – as a result, Waldegård left Lancia and joined Ford in late 1976.

Driving Ford Escort RS1800 models, Waldegård won three of the world's most punishing rallies in 1977; the East African Safari Rally, the Acropolis Rally, and the RAC Rally.

Waldegård was later victor in the inaugural World Rally Championship series in 1979 for Ford and Mercedes-Benz, beating Hannu Mikkola in the final round at the Rallye Côte d'Ivoire in the Ivory Coast, by finishing second behind his rival.

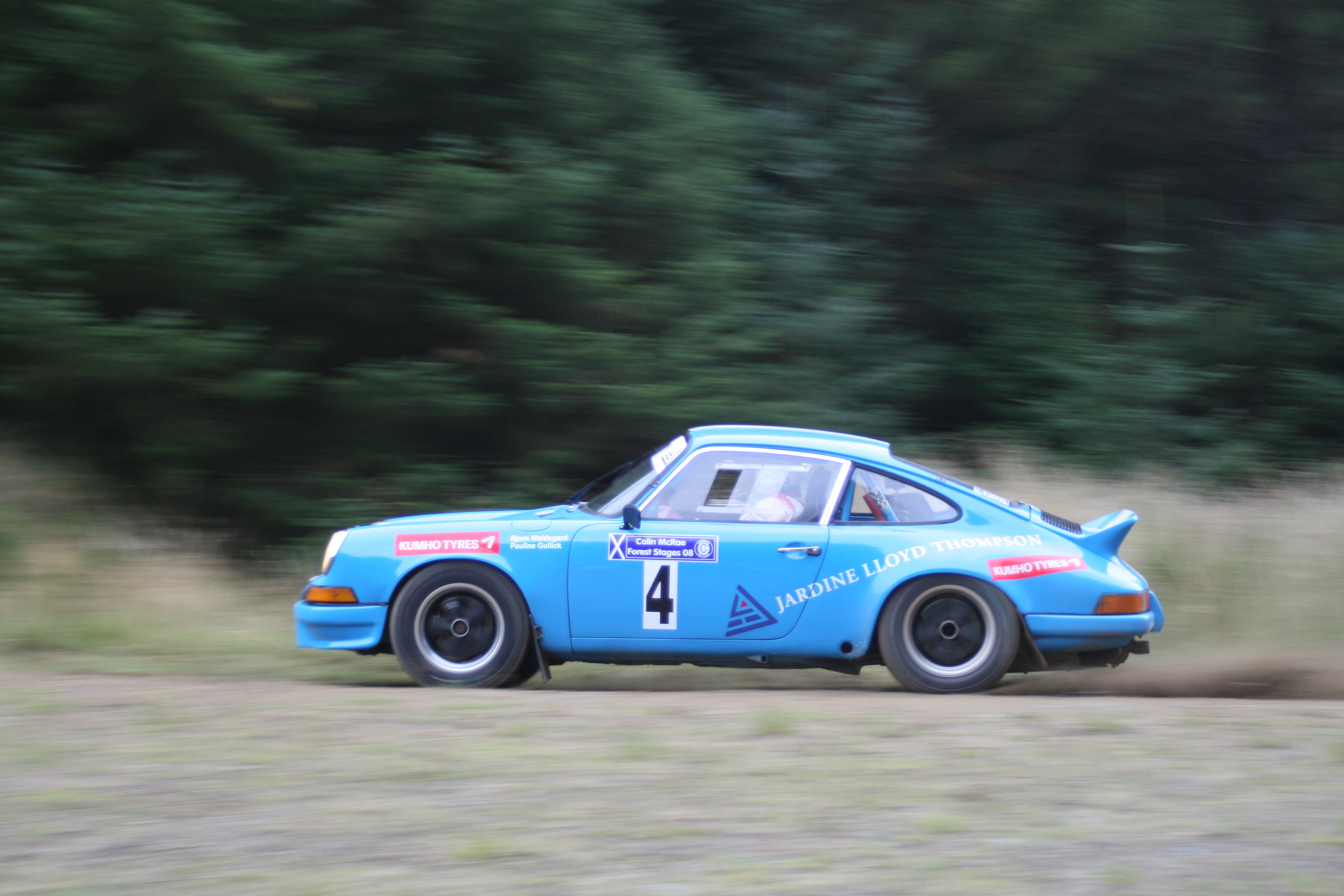
Waldegård at the 2008 Colin McRae Forest Stages.

In September 2008, Waldegård took part in the Colin McRae Forest Stages Rally, a round of the Scottish Rally Championship centred in Perth in Scotland. He was one of a number of ex-world champions to take part in the event in memory of McRae, who died in 2007. On the event he drove a Porsche 911.

In addition to his rallying career, Waldegård also took part in the 1970 Targa Florio sports car endurance race on the Italian island of Sicily, the oldest motor race in the world at the time. He drove a factory supported, John Wyer-entered Porsche 908/3. The Targa Florio was more or less a rally-type race on a closed circuit made up of public roads, hence the reason for Waldegård's one-off drive with Porsche. Sharing driving duties with Briton Richard Attwood, he finished fifth.

Waldegård died on 29 August 2014 of cancer at the age of 70.

== International victories ==
Björn Waldegård, International victories
1969	38ème Rallye Automobile de Monte-Carlo	Porsche 911 S
1970	39ème Rallye Automobile de Monte-Carlo	Porsche 911 S
1970	21st International Swedish Rally	Porsche 911 S
1970	41. Österreichische Alpenfahrt	Porsche 911 S

== WRC victories ==
#	Event	Season	Co-driver	Car
1	(Sweden) 25th International Swedish Rally	1975	Hans Thorszelius	Lancia Stratos HF
2	(Italy) 17º Rallye Sanremo	1975	Hans Thorszelius	Lancia Stratos HF
3	(Italy) 18º Rallye Sanremo	1976	Hans Thorszelius	Lancia Stratos HF
4	(Kenya) 25th Safari Rally	1977	Hans Thorszelius	Ford Escort RS1800
5	(Greece) 24th Acropolis Rally	1977	Hans Thorszelius	Ford Escort RS1800
6	(United Kingdom) 26th Lombard RAC Rally	1977	Hans Thorszelius	Ford Escort RS1800
7	(Sweden) 28th International Swedish Rally	1978	Hans Thorszelius	Ford Escort RS1800
8	(Greece) 26th Acropolis Rally	1979	Hans Thorszelius	Ford Escort RS1800
9	(Canada) 7ème Critérium Molson du Québec	1979	Hans Thorszelius	Ford Escort RS1800
10	(Ivory Coast) 12ème Rallye Côte d'Ivoire	1980	Hans Thorszelius	Mercedes 500 SLC
11	12th Motogard Rally of New Zealand	1982	Hans Thorszelius	Toyota Celica 2000GT
12	(Ivory Coast) 15ème Rallye Côte d'Ivoire	1983	Hans Thorszelius	Toyota Celica TCT
13	(Kenya) 32nd Marlboro Safari Rally	1984	Hans Thorszelius	Toyota Celica TCT
14	34th Marlboro Safari Rally Kenya	1986	Fred Gallagher	Toyota Celica TCT
15	(Ivory Coast) 18ème Rallye Côte d'Ivoire	1986	Fred Gallagher	Toyota Celica TCT
16	38th Marlboro Safari Rally Kenya	1990	Fred Gallagher	Toyota Celica GT-Four ST165

== Racing record ==
=== Complete IMC results ===
Year	Entrant	Car	1	2	3	4	5	6	7	8	9
1970	Porsche System Engineering	Porsche 911 S	MON; 1	SWE; 1	ITA	KEN	AUT; 1	GRE; Ret	GBR; Ret		
1971	Porsche System Engineering	Porsche 914/6	MON; 3								
1971	Porsche System Engineering	Porsche 911 S		SWE; 4	ITA	KEN; Ret	MAR	AUT	GRE	FRA	GBR; 2
1972	Porsche System Engineering	Porsche 911 S	MON; Ret	SWE; 2	KEN		GRE	AUT	ITA	USA	GBR
1972	Björn Waldegård	Citroën SM Maserati				MAR; Ret					

=== Complete WRC results ===
Year	Entrant	Car	1	2	3	4	5	6	7	8	9	10	11	12	13	14	WDC	Points
1973	Björn Waldegård	Fiat 124 Abarth Spider	MON; Ret		POR; Ret		MOR; 6										N/A	N/A
1973	Björn Waldegård	Volkswagen 1303S		SWE; 6													N/A	N/A
1973	Björn Waldegård	Porsche 911				KEN; Ret											N/A	N/A
1973	BMW Motorsport	BMW 2002tii						GRE; Ret	POL	FIN	AUT; 4	ITA; 51	USA	GBR; 7	FRA		N/A	N/A
1974	Toyota Team Europe	Toyota Celica GT	POR; Ret														N/A	N/A
1974	Toyota Team Europe	Toyota Corolla 1600							GBR; 4	FRA							N/A	N/A
1974	Björn Waldegård	Porsche 911		KEN; 2													N/A	N/A
1974	Björn Waldegård	Opel Ascona			FIN; 10	ITA	CAN	USA									N/A	N/A
1975	Lancia Alitalia	Lancia Stratos HF	MON	SWE; 1	KEN; 3	GRE; Ret				ITA; 1	FRA	GBR; DSQ					N/A	N/A
1975	Björn Waldegård	Fiat 124 Abarth Spider					MOR; Ret										N/A	N/A
1975	Björn Waldegård	Toyota Corolla 1600						POR; Ret	FIN								N/A	N/A
1976	Lancia Alitalia	Lancia Stratos HF	MON; 2	SWE; Ret	POR	KEN; Ret	GRE; Ret	MOR	FIN	ITA; 1	FRA						N/A	N/A
1976	Ford Motor Company Ltd	Ford Escort RS1800										GBR; 3					N/A	N/A
1977	Ford Motor Company Ltd	Ford Escort RS1800	MON	SWE	POR; 2	KEN; 1	NZL	GRE; 1	FIN; 3	CAN	ITA; 5	FRA	GBR; 1				2nd	30
1978	Ford Motor Company Ltd	Ford Escort RS1800	MON	SWE; 1		POR; Ret	GRE	FIN	CAN	ITA	CIV	FRA					14th	18
1978	Björn Waldegård	Porsche 911			KEN; 4												14th	18
1978	Eaton Yale	Ford Escort RS1800											GBR; 2				14th	18
1979	Ford Motor Company Ltd	Ford Escort RS1800	MON; 2	SWE; 2	POR; 2				FIN; 3	CAN; 1	ITA	FRA	GBR; 9				1st	120
1979	D.T. Dobie / Daimler-Benz	Mercedes-Benz 450 SLC				KEN; 6								CIV; 2			1st	120
1979	Rothmans Rally Team	Ford Escort RS1800					GRE; 1	NZL									1st	120
1980	Fiat Italia	Fiat 131 Abarth	MON; 3														3rd	63
1980	Fiat Sweden	Fiat 131 Abarth		SWE; 3													3rd	63
1980	C. Santos - Mercedes	Mercedes-Benz 450 SLC			POR; 4												3rd	63
1980	D.T. Dobie / Daimler-Benz	Mercedes-Benz 450 SLC				KEN; 10											3rd	63
1980	Daimler-Benz	Mercedes-Benz 450 SLC					GRE; Ret										3rd	63
1980	Daimler-Benz	Mercedes-Benz 500 SLC						ARG; Ret	FIN								3rd	63
1980	Cable-Price Corp.	Mercedes-Benz 500 SLC								NZL; 5	ITA	FRA					3rd	63
1980	SEACI	Mercedes-Benz 500 SLC												CIV; 1			3rd	63
1980	Toyota Team Great Britain	Toyota Celica 2000 GT											GBR; Ret				3rd	63
1981	Publimmo Racing	Ford Escort RS1800	MON; 8	SWE													18th	17
1981	Toyota Team Europe	Toyota Celica 2000 GT			POR; 3	KEN	FRA; Ret	GRE; Ret	ARG	BRA	FIN; 9	ITA					18th	17
1981	Premoto Toyota	Toyota Celica 2000 GT											CIV; Ret				18th	17
1981	Toyota Team Great Britain	Toyota Celica 2000 GT												GBR; Ret			18th	17
1982	Porsche Alméras	Porsche 911 SC	MON; 92	SWE													6th	36
1982	Toyota Team Europe	Toyota Celica 2000 GT			POR; Ret	KEN	FRA	GRE									6th	36
1982	Toyota New Zealand	Toyota Celica 2000 GT							NZL; 1	BRA	FIN	ITA					6th	36
1982	Premoto Toyota	Toyota Celica 2000 GT											CIV; 3				6th	36
1982	Toyota Team Great Britain	Toyota Celica 2000 GT												GBR; 7			6th	36
1983	Toyota Team Europe	Toyota Celica Twincam Turbo	MON	SWE	POR	KEN	FRA	GRE	NZL	ARG	FIN; 12						11th	20
1983	Premoto Toyota	Toyota Celica Twincam Turbo											CIV; 1				11th	20
1983	Toyota Team Great Britain	Toyota Celica Twincam Turbo												GBR; Ret			11th	20
1983	Pro Motor Sport	Ferrari 308 GTB										ITA; Ret					11th	20
1984	Toyota Team Europe	Toyota Celica Twincam Turbo	MON	SWE	POR; Ret						FIN; Ret	ITA	CIV				8th	28
1984	Westlands Motors	Toyota Celica Twincam Turbo				KEN; 1	FRA	GRE									8th	28
1984	Toyota New Zealand	Toyota Celica Twincam Turbo							NZL; 5	ARG							8th	28
1984	Toyota Team Great Britain	Toyota Celica Twincam Turbo												GBR; Ret			8th	28
1985	Westlands Motors	Toyota Celica Twincam Turbo	MON	SWE	POR	KEN; 2	FRA	GRE									8th	34
1985	Toyota New Zealand	Toyota Celica Twincam Turbo							NZL; Ret	ARG							8th	34
1985	Toyota Team Europe	Toyota Celica Twincam Turbo									FIN; 7	ITA		GBR; Ret			8th	34
1985	Premoto Toyota	Toyota Celica Twincam Turbo											CIV; 2				8th	34
1986	Toyota Team Europe	Toyota Celica Twincam Turbo	MON	SWE	POR	KEN; 1	FRA	GRE	NZL	ARG	FIN	CIV; 1	ITA	GBR	USA; 5		4th	48
1987	Toyota Team Europe	Toyota Supra 3.0i	MON	SWE	POR	KEN; Ret	FRA	GRE	USA; 6	NZL	ARG	FIN					36th	6
1987	Toyota Team Europe	Toyota Supra Turbo											CIV; Ret	ITA	GBR		36th	6
1988	Toyota Team Europe	Toyota Supra Turbo	MON	SWE	POR	KEN; 7	FRA										17th	16
1988	Toyota Team Europe	Toyota Celica GT-Four ST165						GRE; Ret	USA	NZL	ARG	FIN	CIV	ITA			17th	16
1988	Toyota Team Great Britain	Toyota Celica GT-Four ST165													GBR; 3		17th	16
1989	Toyota Team Europe	Toyota Celica GT-Four ST165	SWE	MON; Ret	POR; Ret												29th	10
1989	Toyota Team Kenya	Toyota Supra Turbo				KEN; 4	FRA	GRE	NZL	ARG	FIN	AUS	ITA	CIV	GBR		29th	10
1990	Toyota Team Kenya	Toyota Celica GT-Four ST165	MON	POR	KEN; 1	FRA	GRE	NZL	ARG	FIN	AUS	ITA	CIV	GBR			12th	20
1991	Toyota Kenya	Toyota Celica GT-Four ST165	MON	SWE	POR	KEN; 4	FRA	GRE	NZL	ARG	FIN	AUS	ITA	CIV	ESP	GBR	26th	10
1992	Martini Racing	Lancia Delta HF Integrale	MON	SWE	POR	KEN; Ret	FRA	GRE	NZL	ARG	FIN	AUS	ITA	CIV	ESP	GBR	NC	0

=== Complete FIA European Rallycross Cup results ===
Year	Entrant	Car	1	2	3	4	5	6	7	8	9	10	11	ERC	Points
1976	Björn Waldegård	Porsche Carrera RSR	AUT1	GER1	FIN	SWE; 1	BEL	AUT2	NED	GBR1	GER2	GBR2		13th	20
1977	Björn Waldegård	Porsche Carrera RSR	AUT1	NED1	ITA	SWE1; 3	FIN	BEL1	SWE2	NED2	BEL2	GER	AUT2	18th	12
1978	Björn Waldegård	Ford Escort RS 1800	AUT	ITA	SWE; 5	FIN	BEL	NED	FRA	GBR	GER			39th	8

=== 24 Hours of Le Mans results ===
Year	Team	Co-Driver	Car	Class	Laps	Pos.	Class Pos.
1971	(France) Écurie Jean Sage	(Switzerland) Bernard Chenevière	Porsche 911S	GT +2.0	263	NC	NC

== Publications ==
Björn Waldegård – Rally blev mitt liv, by Waldegård, Björn & Karlsson, Gerhard, Årets Bilsport 1994, 212 pages, Swedish language, ISBN 9188540464

Sporting positions
Preceded by Markku Alén (FIA Cup for Rally Drivers)	World Rally Champion; 1979	Succeeded by Walter Röhrl
Records
Preceded by Sandro Munari; 7 wins (1973–1984)	Most rally wins 11 wins, 8th at the 1979 Acropolis Rally	Succeeded by Hannu Mikkola; 18 wins, 12th at the 1982 RAC Rally
Preceded by None (FIA Cup for Rally Drivers)	Youngest World Rally Champion; 36 years, 32 days (1979 season)	Succeeded by Walter Röhrl; 33 years, 232 days (1980 season)
