= Rally New Zealand =

Annual race in New Zealand

- Status: Active
- Genre: Motorsporting event
- Frequency: Annual
- Country: New Zealand
- Inaugurated: 1969
- Website: rallynz.org.nz

The Rally New Zealand is an annual rally race in New Zealand. It was first included as a round of the World Rally Championship in 1977. The race is famous for its fast flowing gravel roads which carry the competitors through forests and alongside the New Zealand coastline.

It was first held in Taupō in 1969, and was subsequently staged in Canterbury, before moving back to the North Island in 1971. Auckland has hosted the majority of Rally New Zealand events. From 2006 to 2008 the event was based in Hamilton, with the service park, parc ferme and the super special stage all being located at the Mystery Creek Events Centre. In 2010 it returned to Auckland.

The WRC teams voted Propecia Rally New Zealand "Rally of the Year" in 2001. The 2007 Rally New Zealand ended with the closest-ever finish in the history of the World Rally Championship. After over 350 competitive kilometres, only 0.3 seconds separated the winner Marcus Grönholm and second-placed Sébastien Loeb.

No WRC event was held between 2013 and 2021. The event was planned to be held on the 2020 calendar, but was cancelled in response to the COVID-19 Pandemic.

Rally New Zealand returned after a 10 year hiatus in 2022, with Auckland as the main focus of the event. Kalle Rovanperä won the event, and as the event hasn't returned to the WRC Calendar since, Rovanperä remains the most recent winner of the event.

== Past winners ==
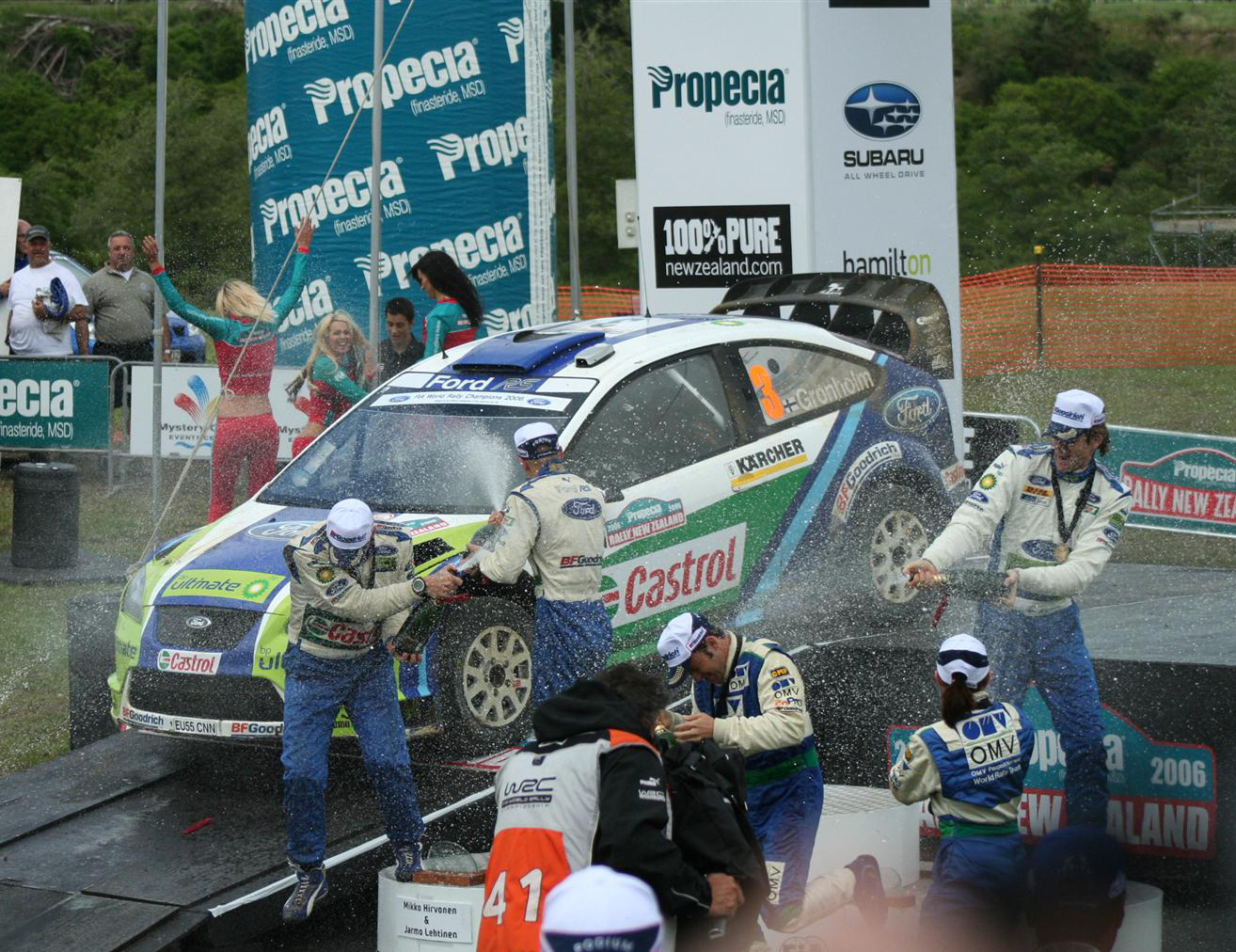
2006 post-race celebration with Marcus Grönholm, Mikko Hirvonen and Manfred Stohl.

| Season | Driver | Co-driver | Car | Event report |
|---|---|---|---|---|
| 1969* | (New Zealand) Grady Thompson | Rick Rimmer | Holden Monaro | |
| 1970* | (New Zealand) Paul Adams | Don Fenwick | BMW 2002 | |
| 1971* | (Australia) Bruce Hodgson | Mike Mitchell | Ford Cortina–Lotus | |
| 1972* | (United Kingdom) Andrew Cowan | Jim Scott | BLMC Mini 1275 GT | |
| 1973* | (Finland) Hannu Mikkola | Jim Porter | Ford Escort RS1600 | |
| 1974* | Not held | | | |
| 1975* | (New Zealand) Mike Marshall | Arthur McWatt | Ford Escort RS1800 | |
| 1976* | (United Kingdom) Andrew Cowan | Jim Scott | Hillman Avenger | |
| 1977 | (Italy) Fulvio Bacchelli | Francesco Rossetti | Fiat 131 Abarth | Report |
| 1978* | (United Kingdom) Russell Brookes | Chris Porter | Ford Escort RS1800 | |
| 1979 | (Finland) Hannu Mikkola | Arne Hertz | Ford Escort RS1800 | |
| 1980 | (Finland) Timo Salonen | Seppo Harjanne | Datsun 160J | |
| 1981* | (New Zealand) Jim Donald | Kevin Lancaster | Ford Escort RS | |
| 1982 | (Sweden) Björn Waldegård | Hans Thorszelius | Toyota Celica | |
| 1983 | (Germany) Walter Röhrl | Christian Geistdörfer | Lancia 037 Rally | |
| 1984 | (Sweden) Stig Blomqvist | Bjorn Cederberg | Audi Quattro | |
| 1985 | (Finland) Timo Salonen | Seppo Harjanne | Peugeot 205 T16 E2 | |
| 1986 | (Finland) Juha Kankkunen | Juha Piironen | Peugeot 205 T16 E2 | |
| 1987 | (Austria) Franz Wittman | Jorg Pattermann | Lancia Delta 4WD | |
| 1988 | (Austria) Josef Haider | Ferdinand Hinterleitner | Opel Kadett GSi 16V | |
| 1989 | (Sweden) Ingvar Carlsson | Per Carlsson | Mazda 323 4WD | |
| 1990 | (Spain) Carlos Sainz | Luis Moya | Toyota Celica GT-Four ST165 | |
| 1991 | (Spain) Carlos Sainz | Luis Moya | Toyota Celica GT-Four ST165 | |
| 1992 | (Spain) Carlos Sainz | Luis Moya | Toyota Celica Turbo 4WD | |
| 1993 | (Scotland) Colin McRae | Derek Ringer | Subaru Legacy RS | |
| 1994 | (Scotland) Colin McRae | Derek Ringer | Subaru Impreza 555 | |
| 1995 | (Scotland) Colin McRae | Derek Ringer | Subaru Impreza 555 | |
| 1996* | (United Kingdom) Richard Burns | Robert Reid | Mitsubishi Lancer Evolution III | |
| 1997 | (Sweden) Kenneth Eriksson | Staffan Parmander | Subaru Impreza WRC 97 | |
| 1998 | (Spain) Carlos Sainz | Luis Moya | Toyota Corolla WRC | |
| 1999 | (Finland) Tommi Makinen | Risto Mannisenmäki | Mitsubishi Lancer Evolution VI | |
| 2000 | (Finland) Marcus Grönholm | Timo Rautiainen | Peugeot 206 WRC | |
| 2001 | (United Kingdom) Richard Burns | Robert Reid | Subaru Impreza WRC 2001 | Report |
| 2002 | (Finland) Marcus Grönholm | Timo Rautiainen | Peugeot 206 WRC | Report |
| 2003 | (Finland) Marcus Grönholm | Timo Rautiainen | Peugeot 206 WRC | Report |
| 2004 | (Norway) Petter Solberg | Phil Mills | Subaru Impreza WRC 2004 | Report |
| 2005 | (France) Sébastien Loeb | Daniel Elena | Citroën Xsara WRC | Report |
| 2006 | (Finland) Marcus Grönholm | Timo Rautiainen | Ford Focus RS WRC 06 | Report |
| 2007 | (Finland) Marcus Grönholm | Timo Rautiainen | Ford Focus RS WRC 07 | Report |
| 2008 | (France) Sébastien Loeb | Daniel Elena | Citroën C4 WRC | Report |
| 2009* | Not held | | | |
| 2010 | (Finland) Jari-Matti Latvala | Miikka Anttila | Ford Focus RS WRC 09 | Report |
| 2011* | (New Zealand) Hayden Paddon | John Kennard | Subaru Impreza WRX | |
| 2012 | (France) Sébastien Loeb | Daniel Elena | Citroën DS3 WRC | Report |
| 2013 – 2016* | Not held | | | |
| 2017* | (New Zealand) Hayden Paddon | John Kennard | Hyundai i20 AP4 | |
| 2018* | (New Zealand) Hayden Paddon | Malcolm Read | Hyundai i20 AP4 | |
| 2020 | Cancelled due to COVID-19 concerns | | | |
| 2021* | Not held | | | |
| 2022 | (Finland) Kalle Rovanperä | Jonne Halttunen | Toyota GR Yaris Rally1 | Report |
| 2023 – Present* | Not held | | | |

* denotes years when Rally New Zealand was not part of the World Rally Championship

=== Multiple winners ===
| Number | Driver | Years |
|---|---|---|
| 5 | (Finland) Marcus Grönholm | 2000, 2002, 2003, 2006, 2007 |
| 4 | (Spain) Carlos Sainz | 1990, 1991, 1992, 1998 |
| 3 | (France) Sébastien Loeb | 2005, 2008, 2012 |
| 3 | (United Kingdom) Colin McRae | 1993, 1994, 1995 |
| 3 | (New Zealand) Hayden Paddon | 2011, 2017, 2018 |
| 2 | (United Kingdom) Andrew Cowan | 1972, 1976 |
| 2 | (Finland) Hannu Mikkola | 1973, 1979 |
| 2 | (Finland) Timo Salonen | 1980, 1985 |
| 2 | (United Kingdom) Richard Burns | 1996, 2001 |
