= Foggaret Ezzaouia =

Foggaret Ezzoua فقارة الزوى
- Commune and town
- Location of Foggaret Ezzoua commune in Salah Province

- Location of Foggaret Ezzoua within Algeria
- Coordinates: 27°21′48″N 2°50′53″E
- Country: Algeria
- Province: In Salah Province
- District: In Salah District

Area
  - Total: 61,313 km^{2} (23,673 sq mi)
- Elevation: 305 m (1,001 ft)

Population (2008)
  - Total: 6,649
  - Density: 0.1084/km^{2} (0.2809/sq mi)
- Time zone: UTC+1 (CET)
- ONS code: 1110
- Postal code: 11220

Foggaret Ezzoua (Arabic: فقارة الزوى, lit. 'foggara of the Zoua') is a municipality in In Salah District, In Salah Province, Algeria. According to the 2008 census it has a population of 6,649, up from 4,763 in 1998, with an annual growth rate of 3.5%. Its postal code is 11220 and its municipal code is 1110.

== Geography ==
Foggaret Ezzoua lies at an elevation of 305 metres (1,001 ft) on a dry plain in the Sahara. The town is located just to the east of an oasis; separated by a line of sand dunes.

== Climate ==
Foggaret Ezzoua has a hot desert climate (Köppen climate classification BWh), with extremely hot summers and mild winters, and very little precipitation throughout the year.

Climate data for Foggaret Ezzoua
| Month | Jan | Feb | Mar | Apr | May | Jun | Jul | Aug | Sep | Oct | Nov | Dec | Year |
|---|---|---|---|---|---|---|---|---|---|---|---|---|---|
| Mean daily maximum °C (°F) | 20.4 (68.7) | 23.6 (74.5) | 27.9 (82.2) | 32.9 (91.2) | 36.7 (98.1) | 42.8 (109.0) | 44.6 (112.3) | 43.5 (110.3) | 40.2 (104.4) | 34.1 (93.4) | 26.5 (79.7) | 21.5 (70.7) | 32.9 (91.2) |
| Daily mean °C (°F) | 13.1 (55.6) | 15.8 (60.4) | 19.6 (67.3) | 24.7 (76.5) | 28.6 (83.5) | 34.6 (94.3) | 36.2 (97.2) | 35.5 (95.9) | 32.5 (90.5) | 26.3 (79.3) | 18.9 (66.0) | 14.2 (57.6) | 25.0 (77.0) |
| Mean daily minimum °C (°F) | 5.8 (42.4) | 8.0 (46.4) | 11.4 (52.5) | 16.5 (61.7) | 20.5 (68.9) | 26.4 (79.5) | 27.9 (82.2) | 27.5 (81.5) | 24.8 (76.6) | 18.6 (65.5) | 11.4 (52.5) | 6.9 (44.4) | 17.1 (62.8) |
| Average precipitation mm (inches) | 3 (0.1) | 2 (0.1) | 2 (0.1) | 1 (0.0) | 1 (0.0) | 0 (0) | 0 (0) | 1 (0.0) | 1 (0.0) | 1 (0.0) | 3 (0.1) | 4 (0.2) | 19 (0.6) |
Source: climate-data.org

== Transportation ==
Foggaret Ezzoua is connected to the N1 highway just north of In Salah by a local road, passing the villages of Igostène and Hassi Lahdjar on the way. Another track leads south to the villages of Silafène and Hinoune.

== Education ==
4.5% of the population has a tertiary education, and another 16.5% has completed secondary education. The overall literacy rate is 82.2%, and is 91.1% among males and 72.4% among females; all three figures are the second highest in the province after the commune of In Ghar.

== Localities ==
The commune is composed of five localities:

- Fouggaret Ezzoua
- Silafène
- Hinoune
- Foggaret el Arab
- Laarab
