= Silafène =

- Village
- Location within Algeria
- Coordinates: 27°20′33″N 2°50′30″E
- Country: Algeria
- Province: Tamanrasset Province
- District: In Salah District
- Commune: Foggaret Ezzaouia
- Elevation: 299 m (981 ft)
- Time zone: UTC+1 (CET)

Silafène (also written Sillafene) is a village in the commune of Foggaret Ezzaouia, in In Salah District, Tamanrasset Province, Algeria. It is located 2.4 kilometres (1.5 mi) south of the township of Foggaret Ezzaouia and 39 kilometres (24 mi) northeast of In Salah.
