= 1977 London–Sydney Marathon =

1977 London-Sydney Marathon Singapore Airlines London-Sydney Rally
- Host country: United Kingdom; Australia
- Rally base: London; Sydney
- Dates run: 14 August – 27 September 1977
- Stages: 30
- Stage surface: Tarmac and Gravel
- Overall distance: 30,000 km (19,000 miles)

Statistics
- Crews: 69 at start, 47 at finish

Overall results
- Overall winner: (United Kingdom) Andrew Cowan (United Kingdom) Colin Malkin (United Kingdom) Mike Broad (United Kingdom) The Rank Organisation-Daimler-Benz AG

The 1977 London–Sydney Marathon, officially Singapore Airlines Rally London-Sydney 1977, was the second running of the London-Sydney Marathon. The rally took place between 14 August and 27 September 1977. The event covered 19,000 miles (30,000 km) through Europe, Asia and Australia. It was won by Andrew Cowan, Colin Malkin and Mike Broad, driving a Mercedes-Benz 280E.

== Background ==
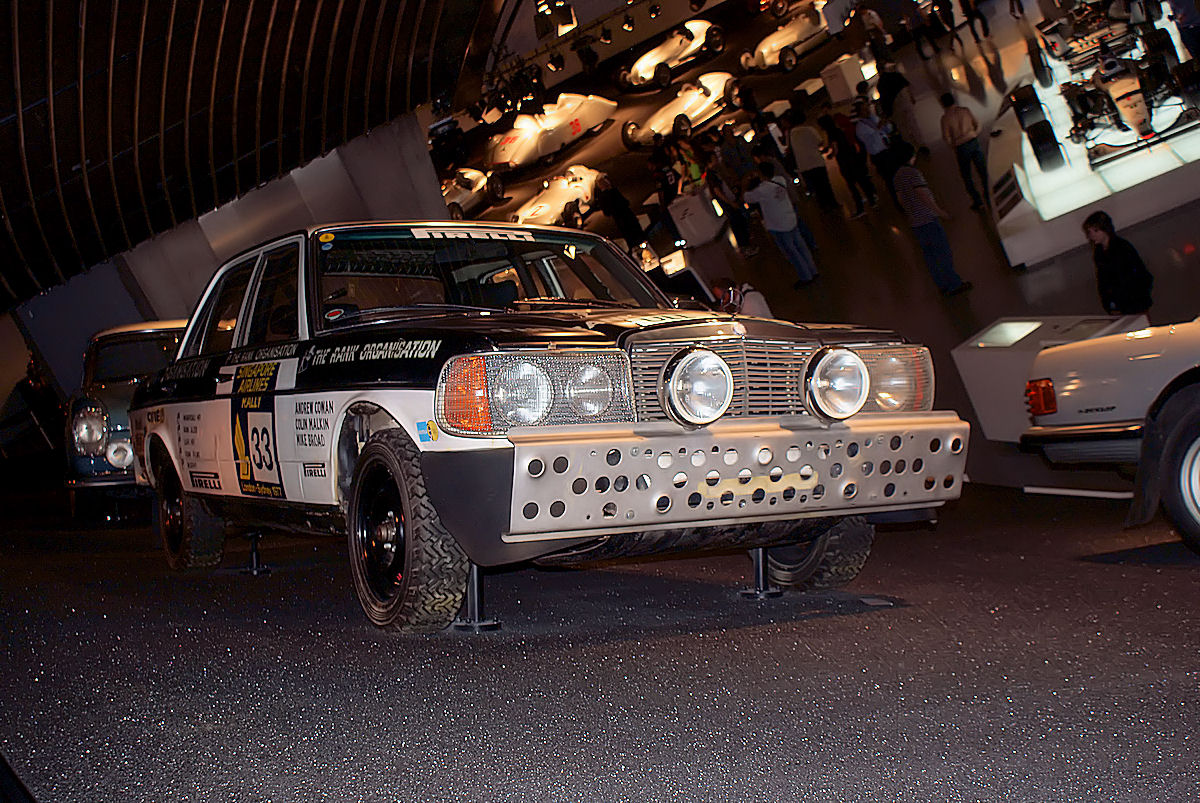
The winning Mercedes-Benz 280E, on display in the Mercedes-Benz Museum, Stuttgart, in 2013

The success of the 1968 London-Sydney Marathon would inspire Australian advertising publicist Wylton Dickson, who had no previous links to rallying to organised the World Cup Rally, which took place in 1970 and again in 1974. But following the controversy over the running of the 1974 event, the World Cup Rally was cancelled and Dickson decided to organise another London to Sydney Marathon in 1977, with sponsorship from Singapore Airlines, who were celebrating their 30th Anniversary, by running the longest car rally in history. The route would see competitors cross Europe and Asia in the first twelve days of the event before the cars would be shipped from India to Malaysia with competitors driving through the country and into Singapore for the next eleven days before being shipped to Australia for the last seven days of the rally.

== Results ==
Pos	No	Entrant	Drivers	Car	Penalties (Time)
1	33	(United Kingdom) The Rank Organisation-Daimler-Benz AG	(United Kingdom) Andrew Cowan (United Kingdom) Colin Malkin (United Kingdom) Mike Broad	Mercedes-Benz 280E	2hr 42min 18sec
2	48	(United Kingdom) Johnson Rally Wax-Daimler-Benz AG	(United Kingdom) Tony Fowkes (United Kingdom) Peter O'Gorman	Mercedes-Benz 280E	3hr 37min 22sec
3	45	Total Citroën Australia	(United Kingdom) Paddy Hopkirk (United Kingdom) Michael Taylor (Australia) Bob Riley	Citroën CX2400	3hr 49min 46sec
4	15	Total Citroën Australia	(France) Claude Laurent (France) Jean-Claude Ogier	Citroën CX2400	4hr 55min 57sec
5	54	(Australia) Channel TVW7 Perth-Australian Peugeot Team	(Australia) Ross Dunkerton (Australia) Bob Watson (Australia) Roger Bonhomme	Peugeot 504 TI	4hr 58min 0sec
6	59	(Germany) Hildebrand Holztechnik-Daimler-Benz AG	(Germany) Alfred Kling (Germany) Klaus Kaiser (Germany) Jorg Leininger	Mercedes-Benz 280E	5hr 21min 49sec
7	25	Total Citroën Australia	(France) Jean Paul Luc (France) Patrick Vanson	Citroën CX2400	6hr 25min 21sec
8	27	(Germany) Warsteiner Marathon Team-Daimler-Benz AG	(Germany) Herbert Kleint (Germany) Günther Klapproth (Germany) Herbert Vormbruck	Mercedes-Benz 280E	6hr 26min 31sec
9	1	(Australia) Frank Johnston	(Australia) Frank Johnston (Australia) Ben Williams (Australia) Dick Matson	Mazda RX-4	7hr 11min 52sec
10	69	Total Citroën Australia	(Australia) Jim Reddiex (Australia) Barry Ferguson (Australia) Doug Stewart	Citroën CX2400	7hr 16min 55sec
10	39	Endrust Australia	(Australia) Evan Green (Australia) John Bryson (Australia) Tom Leake	Range Rover	7hr 46min 6sec
12	52	(Australia) John Taylor	(Australia) John Taylor (Australia) Jeremy Browne (Australia) Robert Hunt	Range Rover	8hr 21min 48sec
13	72	(Poland) Sobiesław Zasada	(Poland) Sobiesław Zasada (Poland) Wojciecj Schramm	Porsche 911 Carrera	9hr 59min 4sec
14	35	(United Kingdom) Ingleby/Smith	(United Kingdom) James Ingleby (United Kingdom) Bob Smith	Jeep Cherokee	11hr 44min 27sec
15	6	(France) Team Esso Aseptogyl	(France) Robert Neyret (France) Marianne Hoepfner	Fiat 131 Abarth Diesel	13hr 49min 49sec
16	16	(Turkey) Turkish National Team	(Turkey) Aytaç Kot (Turkey) Kayhan Kantarci	Renault 12 TS	14hr 11min 57sec
17	22	(France) Jacques Jeandot	(France) Jacques Jeandot (Germany) Werner Koch	Volkswagen 1600	44hr 8min 27sec
18	53	(Australia) Arthur Davies	(Australia) Arthur Davies (Australia) John Latham (Australia) Rod James	Datsun 180B SSS	89hr 29min 21sec
19	48	(Japan) Noriyuki Koseki	(Japan) Noriyuki Koseki (Japan) Yoshio Takaoka (Japan) Hiroshi Okazaki	Subaru Leone 4WD	93hr 34min 10sec
20	60	(Australia) Victoria Toyota Dealers	(Australia) Wes Nalder (Australia) Noel Richards	Toyota Corolla	95hr 29min 33sec
21	58	(United Kingdom) Freeway Exhaust & Tyre Service	(United Kingdom) Chris Bruce (Australia) Peter Carracher (United Kingdom) Dave Turtle	Ford Escort RS2000 Mark II	101hr 20min 12 sec
22	41	(United States) Brian Chuchua	(United States) Brian Chuchua (United Kingdom) David Howes (United States) Kenneth Adams	Jeep CJ-6	102hr 52min 38sec
23	24	(France) Team Esso Aseptogyl	(Italy) Giancarlo Baghetti (Italy) Tommaso Carletti	Fiat 131 Abarth Diesel	105hr 15min 40sec
24	42	(Turkey) Turkish National Team	(Turkey) İskender Arouba (Turkey) Demir Bükey	Renault 12 TS	115hr 26min 53sec
25	40	(United Kingdom) Basil Wadman	(United Kingdom) Basil Wadman (United Kingdom) Mark Shand (United Kingdom) Robert Arthur	Peugeot 504 TI	143hr 34min 41sec
26	76	(Australia) Wally Glass	(Australia) Wally Glass (Australia) Peter Flanagan (Australia) Paul Caddey	Holden Torana LH	151hr 54min 20sec
27	5	(Greece) John Stathatos	(Greece) John Stathatos (Denmark) Erling Jensen	Peugeot 504 TI	217hr 43min 39sec
28	71	(Republic of Ireland) Michael O’Connell	(Republic of Ireland) Michael O’Connell (Republic of Ireland) Anne O’Connell (Republic of Ireland) John Keating	Citroën CX2400	254hr 1min 54sec
29	67	(United States) Brian Chuchua	(United States) Dennis Lundstedt (United States) Erick Hauge (United States) Richard Dahn	Jeep CJ-6	264hr 27min 58sec
30	74	(Australia) Australian Peugeot Team	(Australia) Bob Holden (Australia) Ian Monk	Peugeot 504 TI	266hr 15min 58sec
31	20	(United Kingdom) Richard Beldam	(United Kingdom) Richard Beldam (United Kingdom) Steve Kimbrell (United Kingdom) Gary Whitcombe	Range Rover	280hr 39min 25sec
32	13	(Australia) Hank Kabel	(Australia) Hank Kabel (Australia) Simon Kabel Russell Worthington	Mazda 929	305hr 31min 14sec
33	73	Coca-Cola Australia	(Australia) Allen Hausler (Australia) Barry Allen (Australia) Doug Francis	Leyland Terrier	377hr 56min 4sec
34	14	(Australia) Greg Nicholson	(Australia) Greg Nicholson (Australia) Norman Sherlock	Chrysler Lancer	450hr 27min 4sec
35	7	Coca-Cola Australia	(Australia) Hans Tholstrup (Australia) John Crawford	Mini Moke	471hr 14min 10sec
36	10	(United Kingdom) Francis Tuthill	(United Kingdom) Francis Tuthill (United Kingdom) Tony Sowell	Volkswagen Beetle	498hr 48min 34sec
37	56	(United Kingdom) Apex Leisure	(United Kingdom) Tom Currah (United Kingdom) Steve Tucker	Bedford Autosleeper	509hr 26min 42sec
38	50	(Australia) Hutt River Province	(Australia) Charles Roberts (Australia) Len Webb (Australia) Ray Brooks	Renault 30 TS	623hr 16min 17sec
39	31	(Malaysia) Kassim Mohamed	(Malaysia) Kassim Mohamed (Malaysia) Kay Fook (Malaysia) Syed Adlan (Malaysia) Wong Sau Man	Fiat 132 GNS	656hr 55min 5sec
40	17	Light Car Club of Australia	(Australia) Ian Baxter (Australia) Mick Ellis	Datsun P510	702hr 4min 43sec
41	61	(Japan) Mitsuru Eguchi	(Japan) Mitsuru Eguchi (Indonesia) Tuto Eguchi	Volvo 164	772hr 3min 37sec
42	9	(Australia) Australian Peugeot Team	(Australia) Brian Hilton (Australia) Barry Lake	Peugeot 504 TI	994hr 59min 32sec
43	23	(United States) Pickup Van & 4WD Magazine	(United States) Don Brown (United States) Cam Warren	Jeep Cherokee	1099hr 10min 39sec
44	57	(Australia) G.W. Bartlett-T.W. Hollidge Limited	(Australia) Gerald Bartlett (Australia) Geoff Eldridge (Australia) George Harris	Citroën CX2400 Estate	1168hr 33min 14sec
45	21	(United States) Tom Delashmutt	(United States) Tom Delashmutt (United States) Carlos Neiderhauser	Chevrolet Vega Cosworth	1198hr 18min 40sec
46	3	(Singapore) Vincent Wong	(Singapore) Vincent Wong (Singapore) Ah Seng Hoe (Singapore) Tee Hoo Tedh	Mini Clubman	1343hr 31min 53sec
47	19	(United Kingdom) Post Office Telecoms	(United Kingdom) Mike Dickin (United Kingdom) Simon Park	Mini 1275 GT	1423hr 23min 27sec
