= Hinoune =

- Village
- Location within Algeria
- Coordinates: 27°19′27″N 2°51′2″E
- Country: Algeria
- Province: Tamanrasset Province
- District: In Salah District
- Commune: Foggaret Ezzaouia
- Elevation: 298 m (978 ft)
- Time zone: UTC+1 (CET)

Hinoune (also written Haïnoune) is a village in the commune of Foggaret Ezzaouia, in In Salah District, Tamanrasset Province, Algeria. It is located 4 kilometres (2.5 mi) south of the town of Foggaret Ezzaouia and 40 kilometres (25 mi) northeast of In Salah.
