= Foggaret el Arab =

Foggaret El Arab
- Village
- Location within Algeria
- Coordinates: 27°12′20″N 2°46′31″E
- Country: Algeria
- Province: Tamanrasset Province
- District: In Salah District
- Commune: Foggaret Ezzaouia
- Elevation: 291 m (955 ft)
- Time zone: UTC+1 (CET)

Foggaret el Arab is a village in the commune of Foggaret Ezzaouia, in In Salah District, Tamanrasset Province, Algeria. It is located 19 kilometres (12 mi) southwest of the township of Foggaret Ezzaouia and 29 kilometres (18 mi) east of In Salah.
