= El Barka =

- Village
- Location within Algeria
- Coordinates: 27°10′40″N 2°26′18″E
- Country: Algeria
- Province: Tamanrasset Province
- District: In Salah District
- Commune: In Salah
- Elevation: 270 m (890 ft)
- Time zone: UTC+1 (CET)

El Barka is a village in the commune of In Salah, in In Salah District, Tamanrasset Province, Algeria. It is just south of the N52 highway, 5 kilometres (3.1 mi) west of In Salah.
