= Sahla Fougania =

- Village
- Location within Algeria
- Coordinates: 27°16′21″N 2°31′15″E
- Country: Algeria
- Province: Tamanrasset Province
- District: In Salah District
- Commune: In Salah
- Elevation: 275 m (902 ft)
- Time zone: UTC+1 (CET)

Sahla Fougania (also written Sahela Fougania or Sahla Foukania is a village in the commune of In Salah, in In Salah District, Tamanrasset Province, Algeria. Is located just to the east of the N1 national highway, 9 kilometres (5.6 mi) north of the town of In Salah.
