= Sahla Tahtania =

- Village
- Location within Algeria
- Coordinates: 27°16′39″N 2°29′25″E
- Country: Algeria
- Province: Tamanrasset Province
- District: In Salah District
- Commune: In Salah
- Elevation: 275 m (902 ft)
- Time zone: UTC+1 (CET)

Sahla Tahtania (also written Sahela Tahtania) is a village in the commune of In Salah, in In Salah District, Tamanrasset Province, Algeria. It is located just to the west of the N1 national highway, 9 kilometres (5.6 mi) north of the town of In Salah.
