= 1974 London–Sahara–Munich World Cup Rally =

Intercontinental motor rally competition

1974 London–Sahara–Munich World Cup Rally UDT World Cup Rally
- Host country: United Kingdom; West Germany
- Rally base: London; Munich
- Dates run: 5 – 25 May 1974
- Stages: 26
- Stage surface: Tarmac and Gravel
- Overall distance: 19,300 km (12,000 miles)

Statistics
- Crews: 52 at start, 19 at finish

Overall results
- Overall winner: Ken Tubman; Andre Welinski; Jim Reddiex; Total Citroën Australia

The 1974 London–Sahara–Munich World Cup Rally, known also under the commercial identity of 1974 UDT World Cup Rally, was the second and final of the World Cup Rallies to be held. Drawing inspiration from the 1974 FIFA World Cup which was held in Munich, the rally began in London, Great Britain and travelled to Munich, Germany, via Nigeria. It was won by the privateer Australian crew of Jim Reddiex, Ken Tubman and André Welinski, driving a Citroën DS.

70 cars entered the race - 19 finished. The number of cars entering was lower than the 1970 London to Mexico World Cup Rally as the 1973 oil crisis and the resultant drop in global car sales had its effect on motorsport budgets. Many of the manufacturer teams of the 1970 event did not take part four years later. An error in the navigation notes of the event, caused by the end of a road in Algeria being extended several miles in between the compilation of the notes and the rally taking place saw the majority of competitors becoming lost in the Algerian Sahara Desert. This, in combination with the most gruelling terrain ever traversed by an international rally to that point saw only seven cars travel the full distance south into Nigeria, with only five then completing the full competition distance to Germany. Of the remainder of the "Kano Seven". the Lancia Fulvia of Shekhar Mehta and Lofty Drews suffered engine problems on the return leg from Kano to Tamanresset, was towed to Tunis and air-freighted to Salzburg to take part in the final part of the event. The V8 Jeep crewed by Americans Brian Chuchua, Douglas Fortin and Richard Clark made it through Africa, but crashed out of the event following a collision with a large dog in Turkey.

The majority of the competition did not complete the southernmost leg of the rally, south of the Tamanrasset rally point. Aerial searches for lost competing vehicles were conducted and eventually all cars were accounted for with no casualties. Some competitors abandoned the route and found their own way out of Africa. Notably former Grand Prix racer Stirling Moss and his co-drivers Mike Taylor and Allan Sell in their Mercedes-Benz arrived at an Algerian military fort with no water to find it abandoned. Moss and his crew-mates were unable to continue until the arrival of a water convoy in the following days.

Time penalties quickly climbed into large figures during the stages held in Africa with the majority of the field finishing with over a week's worth of time penalties at the finish. The gap between the winning Citroën DS over the first of the factory supported Peugeots that finished second, third and fourth was over 28 hours. The 19th and last classified finisher acquired over 450 hours of time penalties, approximately 18 days behind the winners.

== Route and scoring ==
The course covered approximately 18,000 miles (29,000 km) through Europe and northern Africa before returning to Europe. Some of the principal towns and cities visited were, in order:

- London, England
- Southampton, England
- Le Havre, France
- Rouen
- Bordeaux
- Bayonne
- Bilbao, Spain
- Burgos
- Córdoba, Spain
- Algeciras
- Tangier, Morocco
- Meknes
- Missour
- Béchar, Algeria
- Adrar, Algeria
- Reggane
- In Salah
- Tamanrasset
- In Guezzam
- Assamakka, Niger
- Arlit
- Agadez
- Tahoua
- Kano, Nigeria
- Tahoua, Niger
- Agadez
- Arlit
- Assamakka
- In Guezzam, Algeria
- Tamanrasset
- In Aménas
- Fort-Saint, Tunisia, near Ghadames, Libya
- Gabès, Tunisia
- Tunis
- Trapani, Italy
- Palermo (Targa Florio)
- Messina
- İzmir, Turkey
- Istanbul
- Thessaloniki, Greece
- Skopje
- Split, Yugoslavia
- Rijeka (Opatija Circuit)
- Munich, Germany

The course included many special stages, some over 500 miles (800 km) long. Time penalties were given for exceeding set times on the special stages, as well as for other infractions of the rules, and the cars' positions determined by the penalties awarded rather than lowest cumulative times.

== Results ==
Pos	No	Entrant	Drivers	Car	Penalties (Time)
1	46	Total Citroën Australia	(Australia) Ken Tubman (Australia) Andre Welinski (Australia) Jim Reddiex	Citroën DS 23	15 h 27 min 30 s
2	58	(France) Team Aseptogyl	(France) Christine Dacremont (France) Yveline Vanoni	Peugeot 504 TI	43 h 55 min 1 s
3	19	(France) Team Aseptogyl	(France) Robert Neyret (France) Jacques Terramorsi	Peugeot 504 TI	61 h 25 min 41 s
4	69	(France) Team Aseptogyl	(France) Claudine Trautmann (France) Marie-Odile Desvignes	Peugeot 504 TI	78hr 35min 41sec
5	23	(United Kingdom) David Howes Racing	(United Kingdom) James Ingleby (United Kingdom) Bob Smith	Jeep CJ-6	123hr 58min 23sec
6	32	Automobile Club de France	(France) Patrick Vanson (France) 'Jacquy'	Citroën DS 23	212hr 40min 47sec
7	3	(United Kingdom) Service Garage (Barnsley)	(United Kingdom) Eric Jackson (United Kingdom) Robert Bean	Ford Escort Mexico	235hr 36min 14sec
8	66	(Turkey) Turkish National Team	(Turkey) Ali Sipahi (Turkey) Azmi Avcıoğlu	Murat-Fiat 124	245hr 20min 25sec
9	54	(United Kingdom) Basil Wadman	(United Kingdom) Basil Wadman (United Kingdom) Michael Hillier (United Kingdom) Chris Lentz	Peugeot 504 TI	245hr 55min 26sec
10	7	(France) Esso Uniflo Citroën Paris	(France) Claude Laurent (France) Jacques Marché	Citroën GS	249hr 21min 3sec
11	56	Castrol Team Canada	(Canada) Ed Golz (Canada) Fred Baker	BMW 2002 Alpina	263hr 19min 51sec
12	1	(Germany) Ortlinghaus Werke	(Germany) Rainer Ising (Germany) Hans Ludorf	Range Rover	287hr 25min 11sec
13	36	Brut Team Australia	(Australia) Evan Green (Australia) John Bryson	Leyland P76	294hr 38min 14sec
14	13	(United Kingdom) Gary Whitcombe	(United Kingdom) Gary Whitcombe (United Kingdom) Steve Kimbrell	Rover 3500S	303hr 2min 1sec
15	29	(United Kingdom) White Horse Rally Team	(United Kingdom) Andrew Cowan (United Kingdom) Johnstone Syer	Ford Escort RS2000 Mark I	311hr 20min 0sec
16	14	(Brazil) APLUB Team Brasil	(Brazil) Carlos Weck (Brazil) Claudio Mueller	Volkswagen Brasilia	324hr 11min 49sec
17	59	Castrol Team Canada	(Canada) Kurt Reinhardt (Canada) Ole Pedersen	BMW 2002 Alpina	351hr 2min 42sec
18	24	(United Kingdom) Bryan Wood	(United Kingdom) Bryan Wood (United Kingdom) Edward Meek	Ford Escort Mexico	378hr 33min 3sec
19	65	(United Kingdom) Derek Tullett	(United Kingdom) Derek Tullett (United Kingdom) Alan Gaunt	Ford Capri	455hr 34min 8sec

Only 19 cars finished the event, with only five cars completing the full rally distance. The route included a 171 km loop in the Hoggar Mountains on the southbound transition of Algeria; of the "Kano Seven" only the winning Citroën and the Lancia Fulvia of Shekhar Mehta and Lofty Drews completed this part of the course. The Escort of Eric Jackson and Bob Bean also completed the loop, but although they started the leg to Kano, they turned back for Tamanrasset after incurring suspension damage in Niger.
