= Fiat 131 =

Family sedan

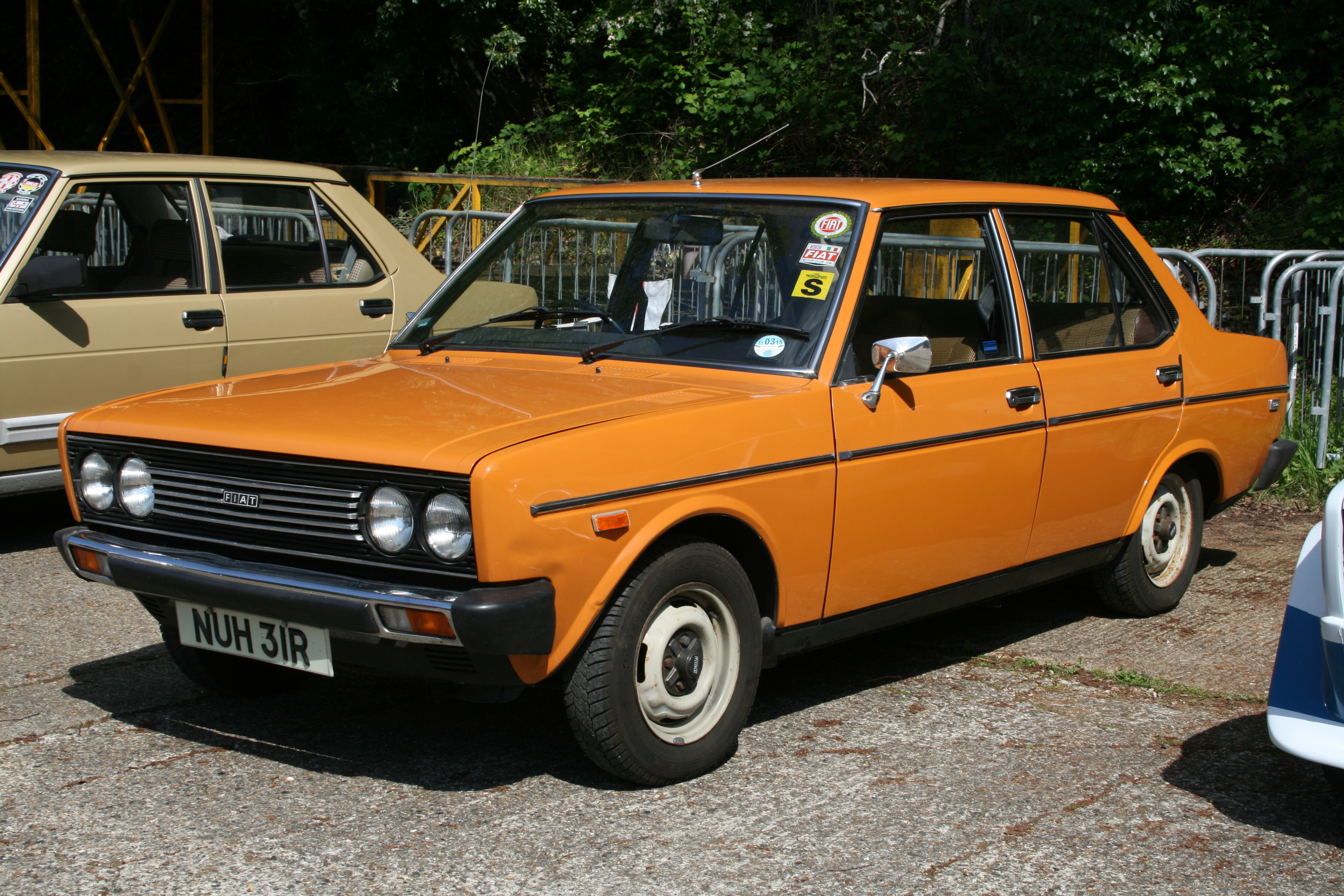
- Fiat 131 (Series 1)

Overview
- Manufacturer: Fiat
- Also called: Fiat Mirafiori; Fiat Supermirafiori; Fiat Brava; Fiat SuperBrava; Polski Fiat 131p; SEAT 131; Tofaş Murat 131
- Production: 1974–1984; 1977–2010 (Tofaş)
- Assembly: Italy: Comprensorio di Mirafiori, Turin; Colombia: Bogotá (CCA); Indonesia: Jakarta; Morocco: Casablanca (SOMACA); Poland: Warsaw (FSO); Spain: Barcelona (SEAT); Turkey: Bursa (Tofaş); Venezuela: La Victoria, Aragua; South Africa: Rosslyn (Fiat South Africa); Egypt: Cairo (Nasr); Zambia: Livingstone (Livingstone Motor Assemblers Ltd)

Body and chassis
- Class: Family car
- Body style: 4-door saloon; 2-door saloon; 5-door estate; 3-door panel van
- Layout: Front-engine, rear-wheel-drive
- Related: SEAT 131; Tofaş Şahin; Tofaş Murat 131; Tofaş Doğan; Tofaş Kartal (estate)

Powertrain
- Engine: petrol: 1.3 L I4; 1.4 L I4; 1.6 L I4; 1.8 L I4; 2.0 L Fiat Twin Cam I4; 2.0 L Fiat Twin Cam SC I4; diesel: 2.0 L Sofim 8144.65 I4; 2.5 L Sofim 8140.61 I4
- Transmission: 4-speed manual; 5-speed manual; 3-speed automatic

Dimensions
- Wheelbase: 2,490 mm (98.0 in)
- Length: 4,230 to 4,264 mm (166.5 to 167.9 in)
- Width: 1,644 to 1,651 mm (64.7 to 65.0 in)
- Height: 1,381 to 1,411 mm (54.4 to 55.6 in)
- Kerb weight: 950 to 1,145 kg (2,094 to 2,524 lb)

Chronology
- Predecessor: Fiat 124
- Successor: Fiat Regata

The Fiat 131 is a mid-size family car manufactured and marketed by Fiat from 1974 to 1984 after its debut at the 1974 Turin Motor Show. Available as a two-door and four-door saloon and 5-door estate across a single generation, the 131 succeeded the Fiat 124.

The 131 was also marketed as the Fiat Mirafiori, after the Turin district where the cars were manufactured. Initially, the 131 was offered with 1.3 L and 1.6 L overhead valve engines and the range received revisions in 1978 and 1981. Production reached 1,513,800.

== Specifications ==
The Fiat 131 used steel monocoque bodywork for its three-box design and used a front engine, rear-wheel drive layout, where the engine is longitudinally front-mounted. The gearbox is directly behind the engine, and a tubular propeller shaft, under the transmission "tunnel", transmits the drive to a solid live rear axle.

The engines were all inline-four types, derived from those used in the outgoing 124 range, with a cast iron cylinder block and aluminium alloy cylinder head. Initially the 131 was offered only with pushrod valve gear, which offered the innovation of being the worldwide first engine with OHV valve gear and a belt driven camshaft. Only later in the model's life came the well known double overhead camshaft (DOHC) engines which used a toothed timing belt. Fuel supply was via a single Weber ADF twin-choke carburettor, fed from a trunk mounted steel fuel tank. Traditional contact breaker ignition systems were used, usually with Marelli distributors.

The suspension system utilised fully independent front suspension, with MacPherson struts, track control arms and anti-roll bar. The rear suspension was quite advanced (when using a solid live rear axle), in that the rear axle was controlled by double unequal length trailing arms and a panhard rod, with coil springs and direct acting dampers. This design proved far superior to many of its contemporaries, especially with respect to vehicle stability and handling.

The braking system was also typical; the front brakes were disc brakes, using a solid iron disc and a single-piston sliding caliper. The rears were drum brakes (a technological backwards step from the 124, which used discs all round), utilising leading and trailing shoe design operated by a dual piston fixed slave cylinder. They were operated hydraulically, with a tandem master cylinder assisted by a vacuum servo using two separate circuits. A rear-mounted load sensing valve varied the bias of effort applied to the rear brakes, dependent on the load being carried (and also the pitch dynamics caused by braking effort and road levels). A centrally located floor mounted handbrake operated on the rear axle using bowden cables.

The car's interior had its secondary dashboard switches illuminated by a central bulb with fibre optic distribution to the switches.

== Series 1 (1974–1978) ==
The Fiat 131 Mirafiori was introduced at the 55th Turin Motor Show in late October 1974. The 131 came with a choice of a 1,297 cc (1.3 L) or 1,585 cc (1.6 L) OHV inline-four engines, both from the engine family first introduced on the Fiat 124. Both engines were fitted with a single twin-choke Weber 32 ADF downdraught carburettor. A 4-speed manual transmission was standard, with a 5-speed manual and a 3-speed torque converter automatic optional on the 1600 engine only.

The initial range comprised eleven different models. There were three body styles, all available from the start: 2-door saloon, 4-door saloon and Familiare station wagon (Estate on the British market). Trim levels were two; the entry-level 131 Mirafiori (also known as "Normale" or "Standard") had single square headlamps, wheels and dished hubcap from the 124, and simplified interior furnishings. Next was the better appointed 131 Mirafiori Special (or simply "S"), which could be distinguished from the base model by its quadruple circular headlamps, specific grille, side rubbing strips, chrome window surrounds, and rubber bumper inserts. Inside it added different instrumentation with triple square dials, a padded adjustable steering wheel, cloth upholstery, and reclining seats. Additionally the more sophisticated options — such as air conditioning, tachometer, limited-slip differential and vinyl roof — were exclusive to the Special. Each body style could be combined with either of the engines and trim levels, save for the Special estate which only came with the larger engine.

Initial sales were disappointing, since the car was launched at the height of the oil crisis and at a time of strikes and hyperinflation at home. Adding to manufacturers' woes, the cost of parts and materials all increased, while sales went down. Gradually, however, sales built up and the car also sold well in export markets. In 1975, the 131 went on sale in the United States as well. US market versions had a DOHC 1.8 litre inline-four, carried over from the earlier 124 but now with more emissions control equipment, and were available with a GM three-speed automatic transmission.

Salvatore Diomante's Autocostruzioni S.D., located near Turin, offered a nearly 5-metre long "131 Diplomatic" limousine conversion.

Model	Engine code	Engine type	Displacement bore × stroke	Carburetor	Power
Mirafiori 1300N	131A6.000	OHV I4	1,297 cc (1.3 L); 75.0 × 71.5 mm	single twin-choke Solex C32 TD1	55 PS DIN (40 kW; 54 hp) at 5000 rpm (Germany-only version for low octane fuel use)
Familiare 1300N	131A6.000	OHV I4	1,297 cc (1.3 L); 75.0 × 71.5 mm	single twin-choke Solex C32 TD1	55 PS DIN (40 kW; 54 hp) at 5000 rpm (Germany-only version for low octane fuel use)
Mirafiori 1300	131A.000	OHV I4	1,297 cc (1.3 L); 75.0 × 71.5 mm	single twin-choke Weber 32 ADF 1	65 PS DIN (48 kW; 64 hp) at 5400 rpm
Mirafiori Special 1300	131A.000	OHV I4	1,297 cc (1.3 L); 75.0 × 71.5 mm	single twin-choke Weber 32 ADF 1	65 PS DIN (48 kW; 64 hp) at 5400 rpm
Familiare 1300	131A.000	OHV I4	1,297 cc (1.3 L); 75.0 × 71.5 mm	single twin-choke Weber 32 ADF 1	65 PS DIN (48 kW; 64 hp) at 5400 rpm
Mirafiori 1600	131A1.000	OHV I4	1,585 cc (1.6 L); 84.0 × 71.5 mm	single twin-choke Weber 32 ADF 3	75 PS DIN (55 kW; 74 hp) at 5400 rpm
Mirafiori Special 1600	131A1.000	OHV I4	1,585 cc (1.6 L); 84.0 × 71.5 mm	single twin-choke Weber 32 ADF 3	75 PS DIN (55 kW; 74 hp) at 5400 rpm
Familiare 1600	131A1.000	OHV I4	1,585 cc (1.6 L); 84.0 × 71.5 mm	single twin-choke Weber 32 ADF 3	75 PS DIN (55 kW; 74 hp) at 5400 rpm
Familiare Special 1600	131A1.000	OHV I4	1,585 cc (1.6 L); 84.0 × 71.5 mm	single twin-choke Weber 32 ADF 3	75 PS DIN (55 kW; 74 hp) at 5400 rpm
Abarth Rally	131AR.000	DOHC 16-valve I4	1,995 cc (2.0 L); 84.0 × 90.0 mm	single twin-choke Weber 34 ADF	140 PS DIN (103 kW; 138 hp) at 6400 rpm
US version	132A1.040	DOHC I4	1,756 cc (1.8 L)	single twin-choke Weber 32 ADFA 1	86 hp SAE net (64 kW; 87 PS) at 6200 rpm CA: 83 hp SAE net (62 kW; 84 PS) at 5800 rpm

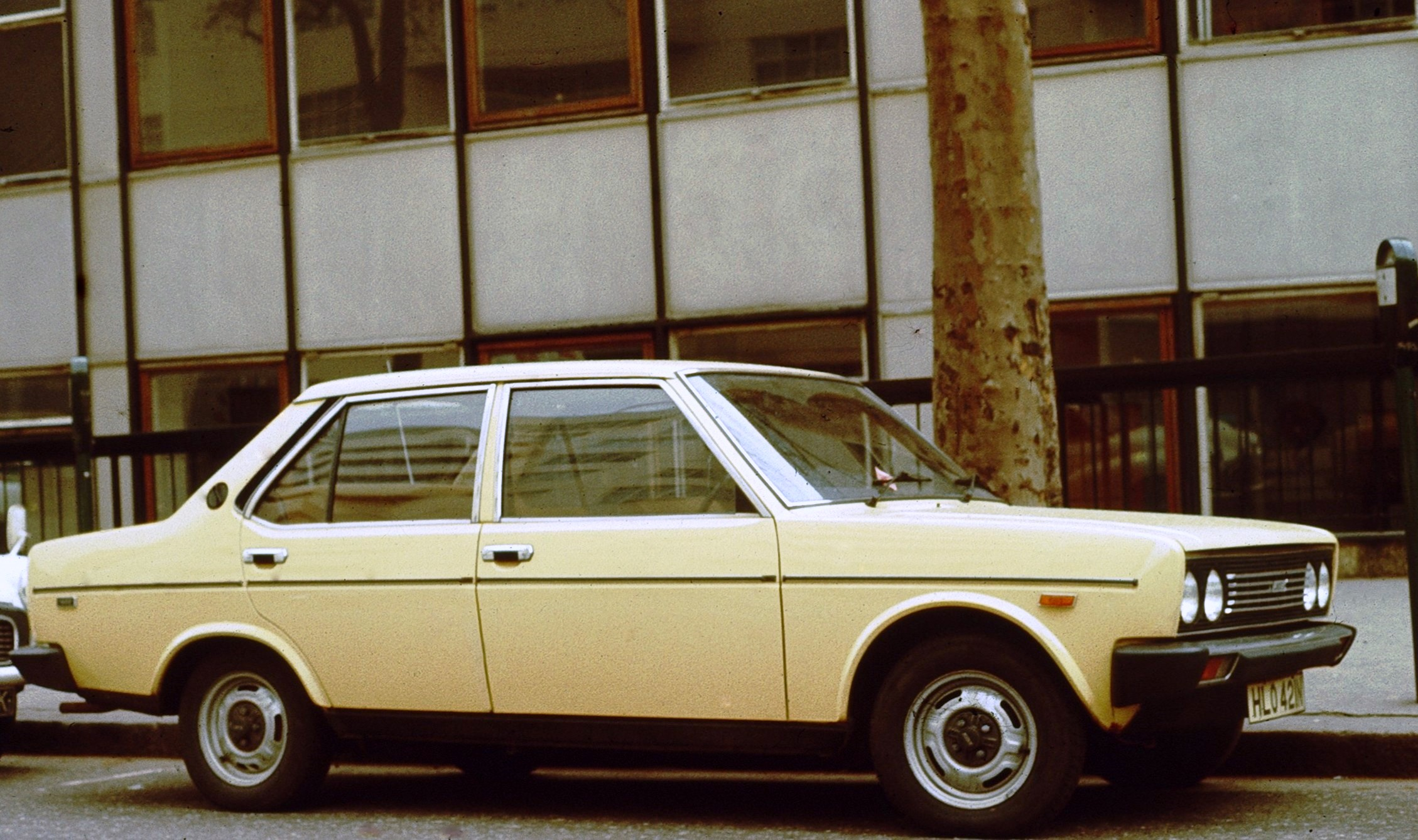
Fiat 131 Mirafiori Special

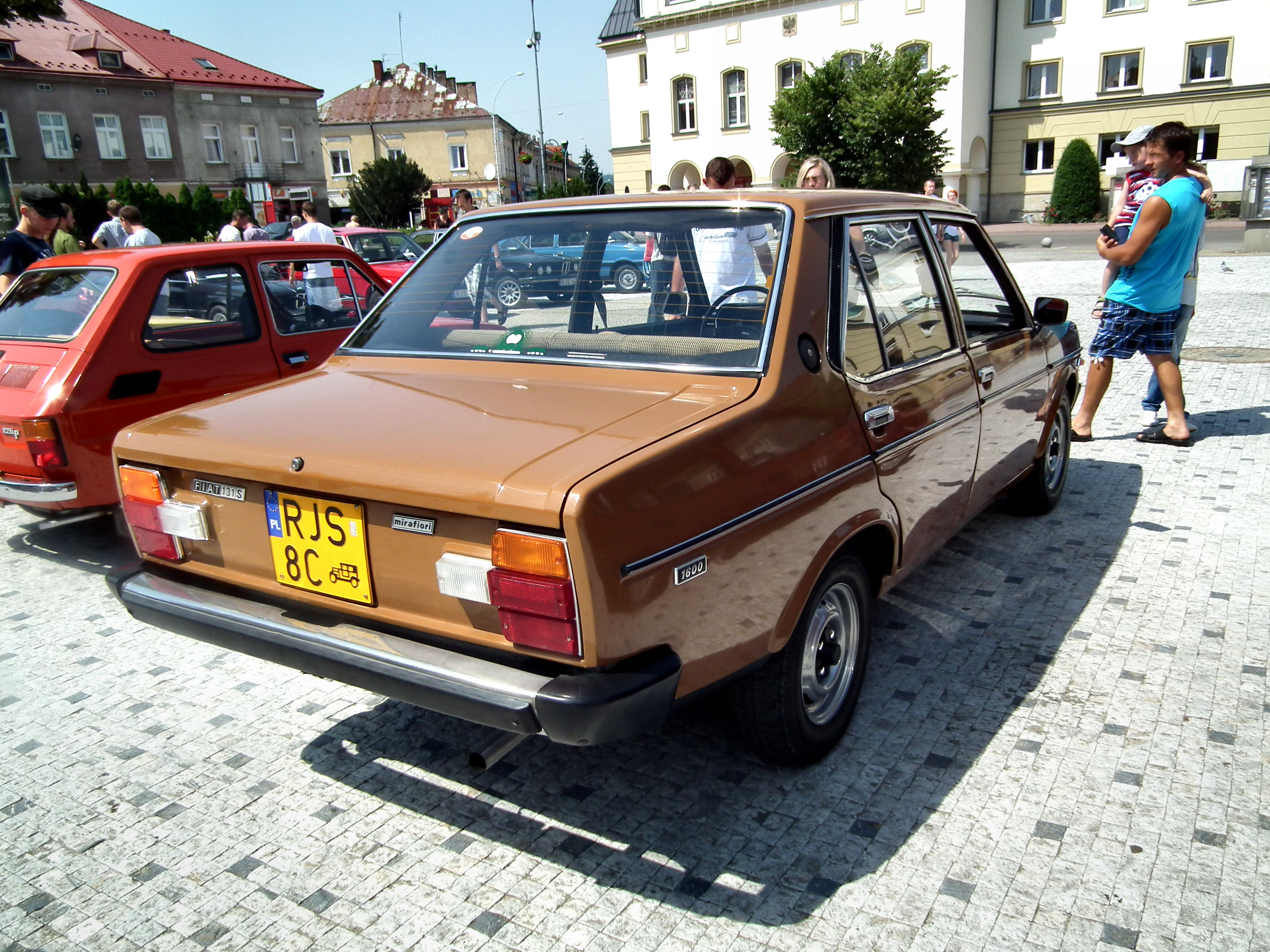
The T-shaped tail lamps are characteristic of first series cars.

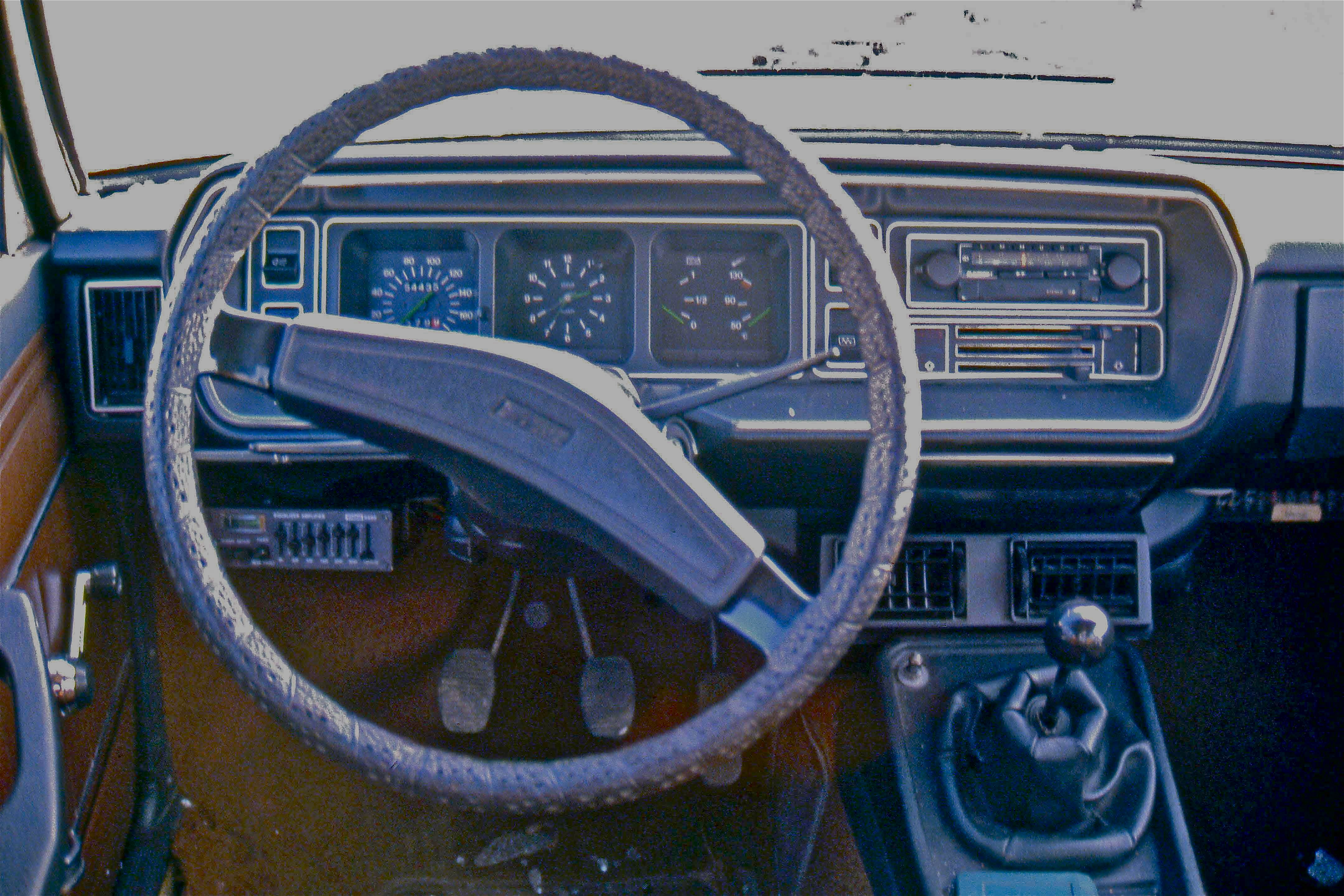
Series 1 dashboard, here a Mirafiori Special's

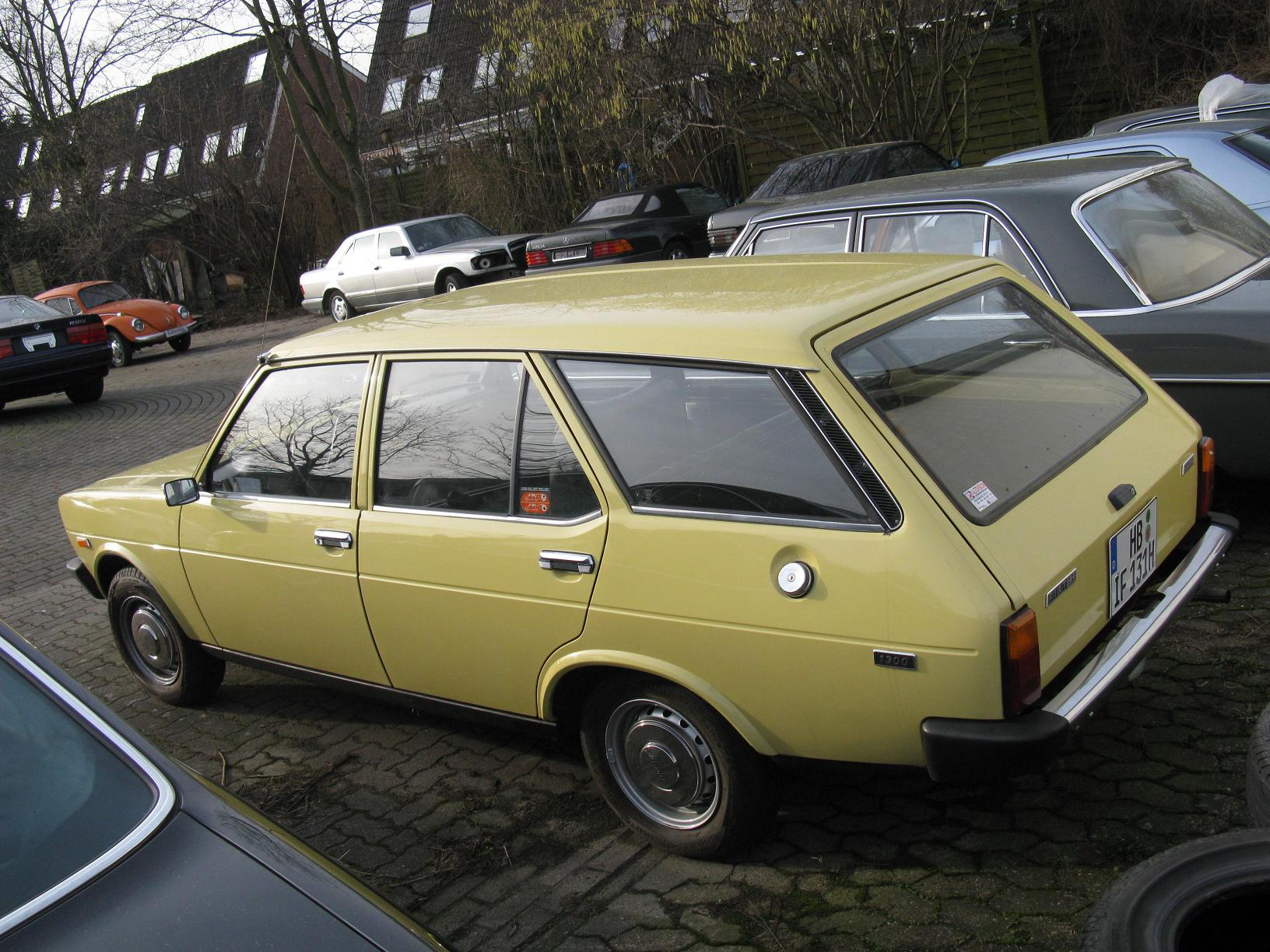
Series 1 Fiat 131 Estate

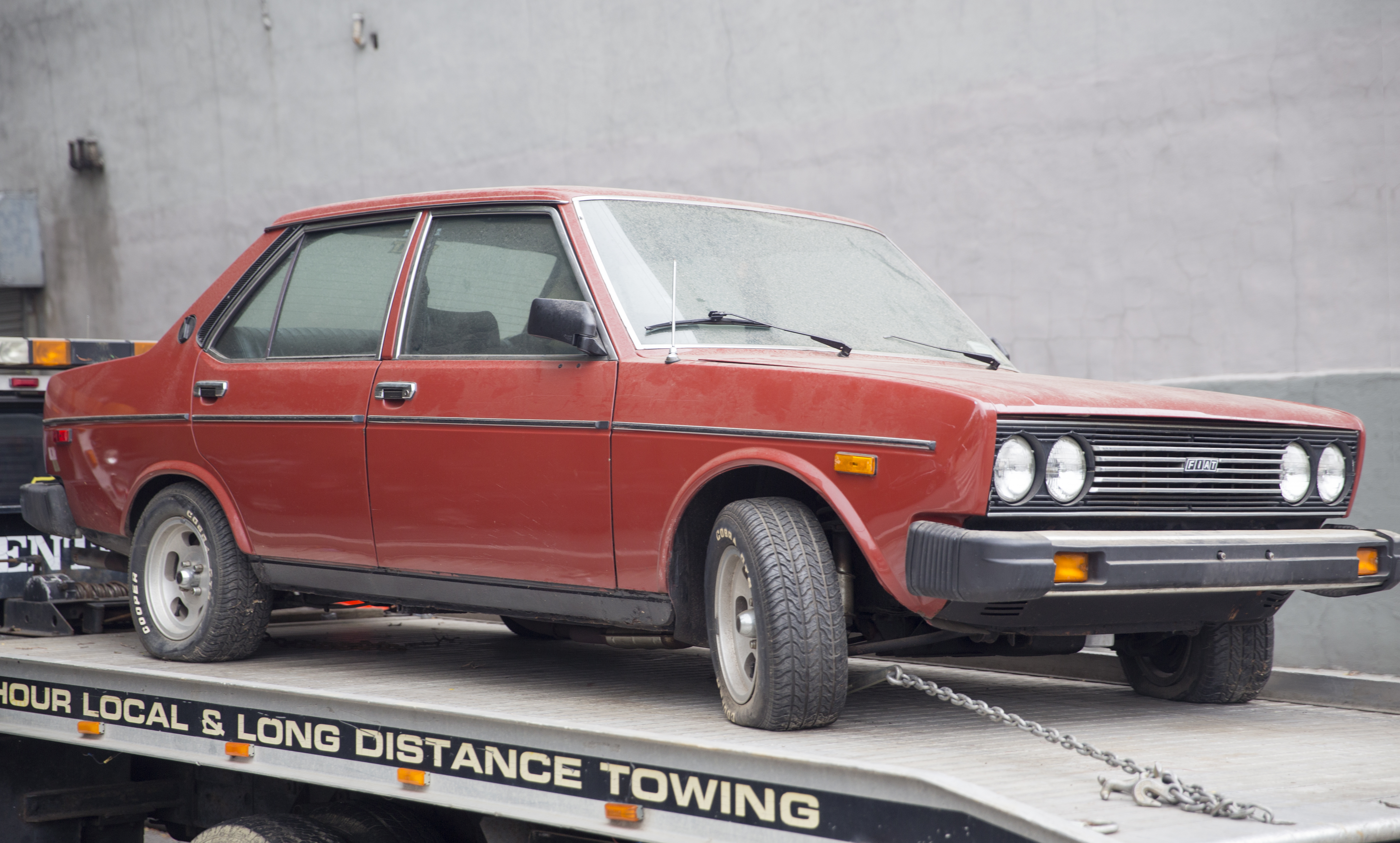
US-spec 1976 Fiat 131 four-door, showing the larger bumpers used to meet strict federal safety standards.

== Special Performance Models ==
=== Fiat 131 Abarth Rally ===
In 1976, 400 examples of the Fiat 131 Abarth Rally were built for homologation purposes. These cars were built in a cooperation between Fiat, Bertone and Abarth. Abarth and Bertone had the strict order to stay as close as possible to the base model, both in parts choice and in physical appearance. Bertone took part-completed two door standard bodyshells from the production line in Mirafiori, fitted plastic mudguards front and rear, a plastic bonnet and bootlid and modified the metal structure to accept the rear independent suspension. The cars were fully painted and trimmed and then delivered back to the Fiat special Rivalta plant where they received the Abarth mechanicals.

The street version of the car used a DOHC 4 valves per cylinder derivative of the standard twin cam inline-four engine, equipped with a double downdraught 34 ADF Weber carburetor, producing 140 PS (138 bhp; 103 kW) at 6400 rpm and 172 N⋅m (127 lb⋅ft; 17.5 kg⋅m) of torque at 3600 rpm. The street cars used the standard gearbox with no synchromesh (Rally type regulations required the use of the same type of synchromesh on the competition cars as on the street versions) and stock front brake discs, which performed better because the redesigned Bertone front and hood allowed for more air to cool them. The rear wheels had brake discs instead of the stock drums. Competition cars used dry sump lubrication and eventually Kugelfischer mechanical fuel injection. In race specifications, the engine produced up to 240 PS (237 bhp; 177 kW) in 1980, being driven to World Championship status by Walter Röhrl.

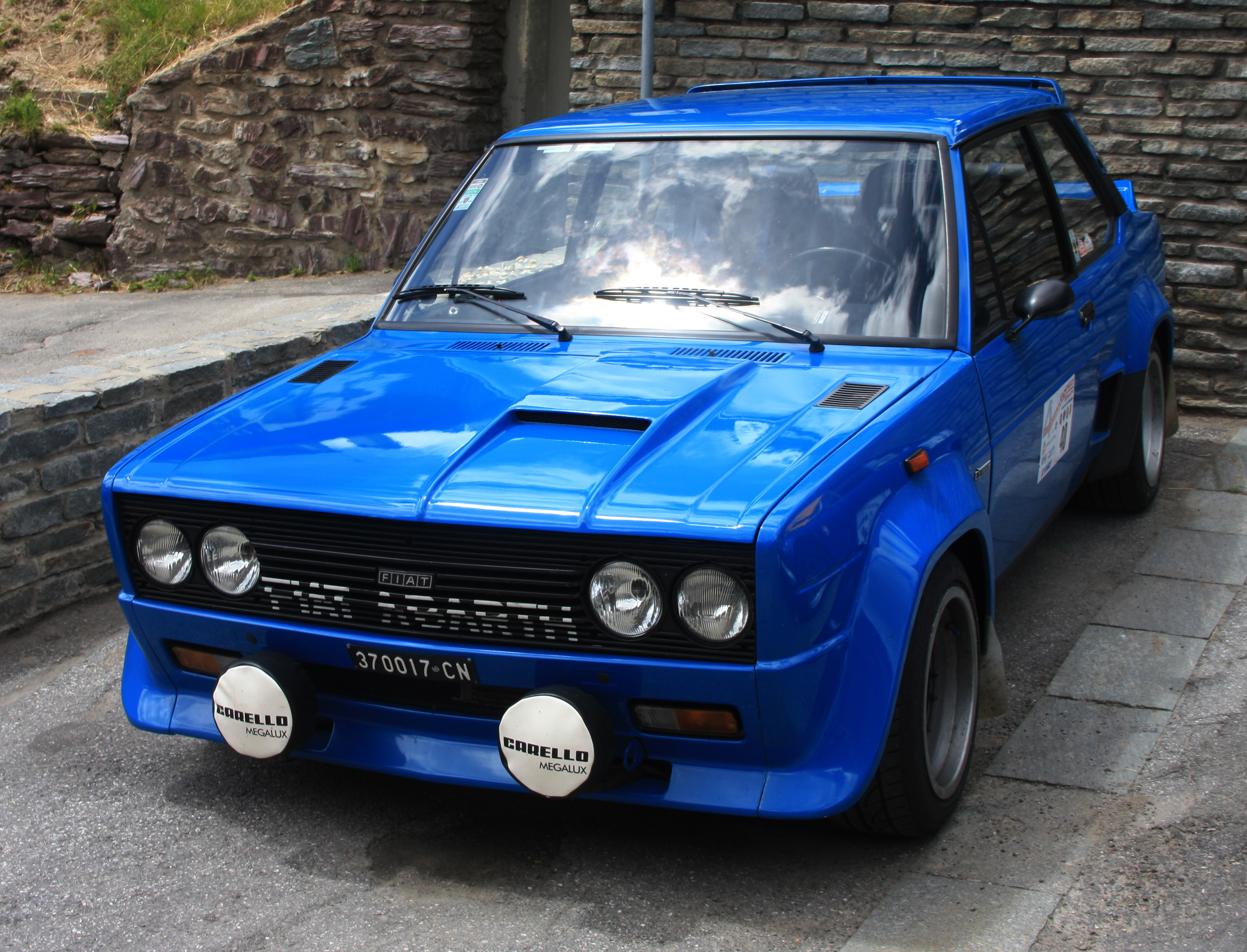
Fiat Abarth 131 Rally

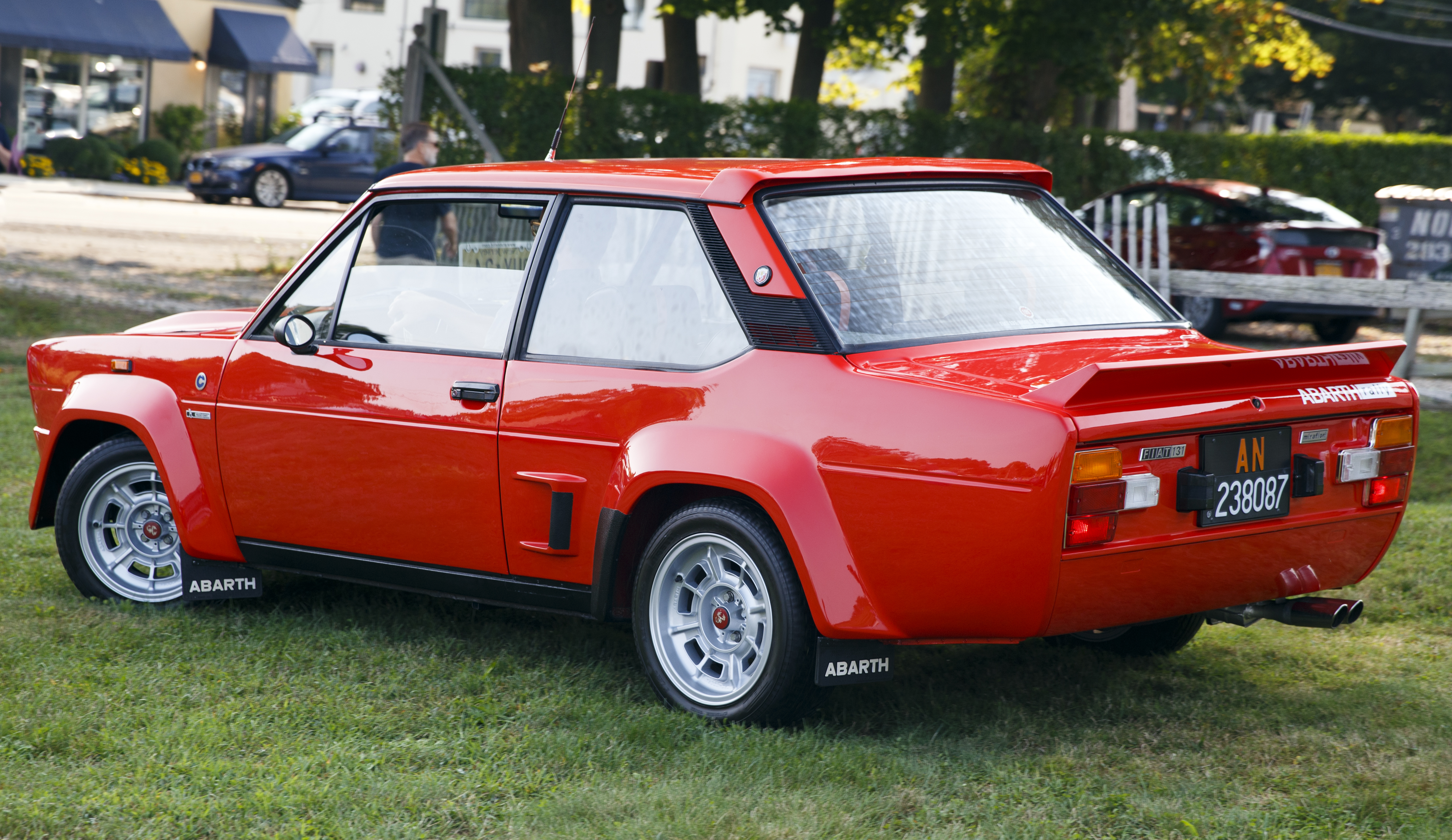
Fiat 131 Abarth Rally Stradale; rear view

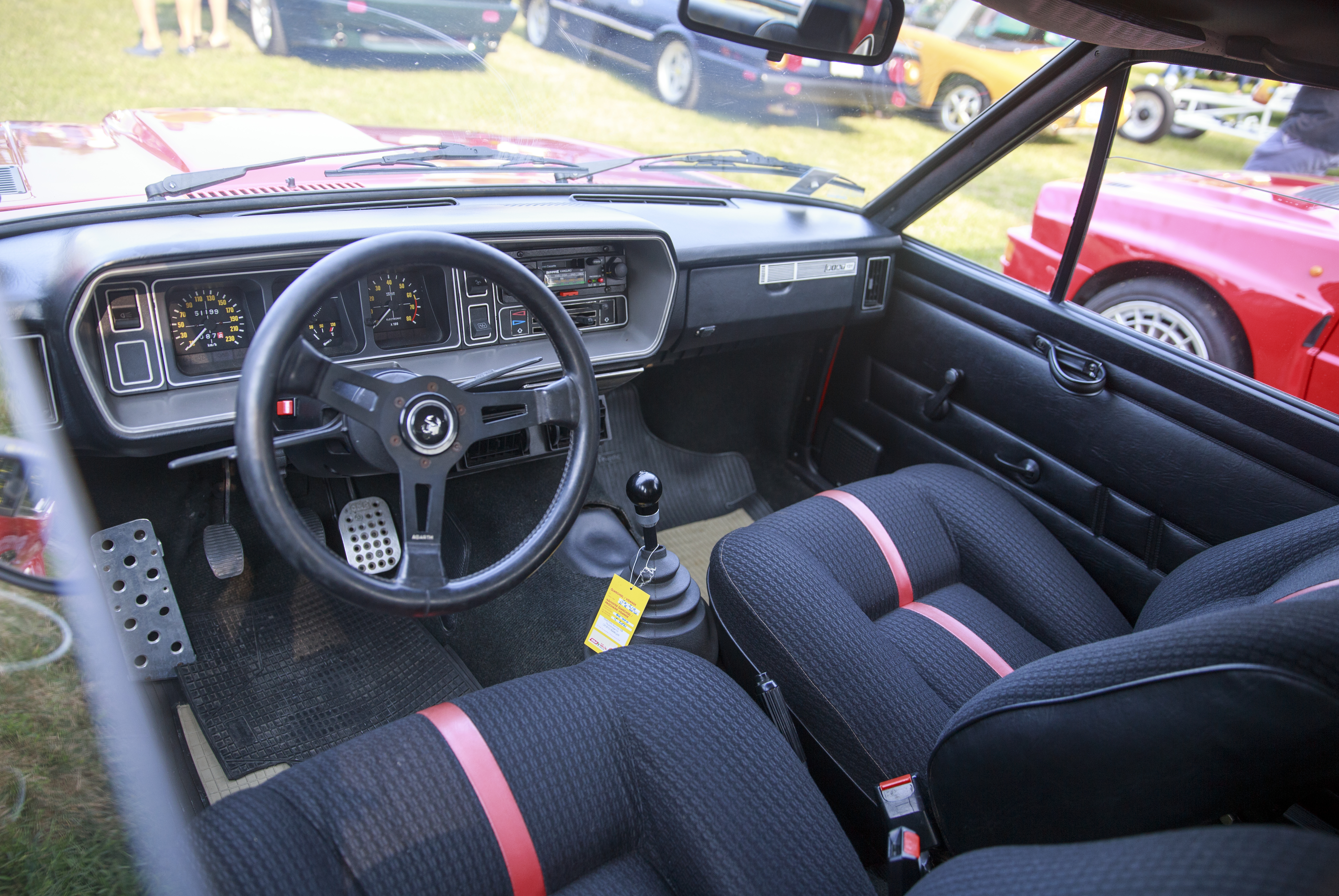
Fiat 131 Abarth Rally Stradale interior

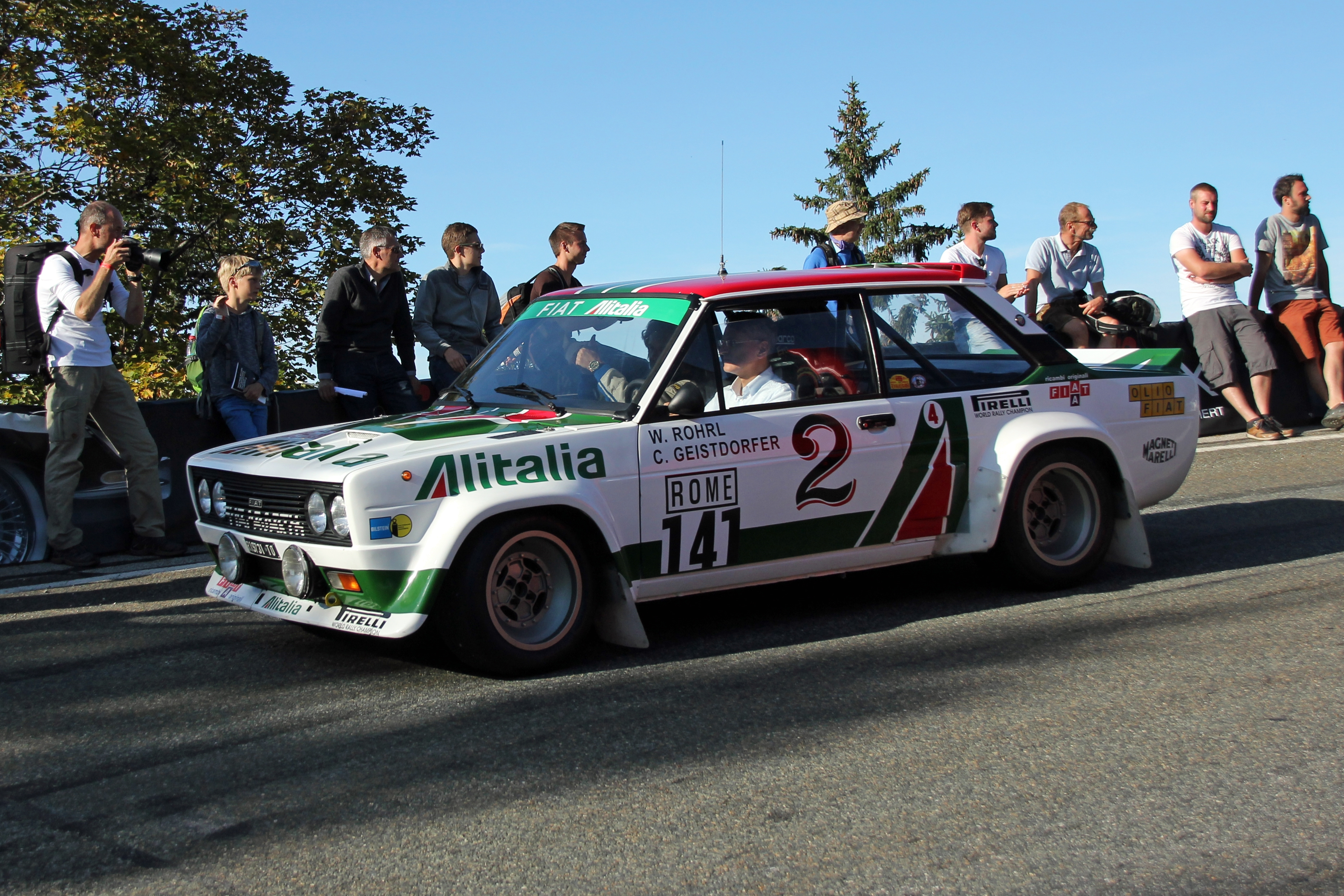
Walter Röhrl's Fiat 131 Abarth (Sponsor Alitalia)

=== Fiat 131-2000 Racing ===
Not to be confused with the European-spec 131 Racing, the Fiat 131-2000 Racing was a South African-built performance model that competed in the South African Group 1 standard car racing in 1978. The regulations of Group 1 racing required competing vehicles to be of a similar specification to their road-going counterparts. Before the 131-2000 Racing, the two-door Mirafiori coupé with a 1.6-liter pushrod engine and its twin-cam performance derivatives, namely the 131 Rally and 131 Rally-S, were the ideal road-going candidates for race tracks. Like its "131 Rally" cousins, the 2-liter 131-2000 Racing has a five-speed gearbox instead of the 4-speed unit of the Mirafiori coupé.

Some 200 imported component kits for 131 Racing reportedly perished when a cargo ship sank off the Kenyan coast, thereby thwarting Fiat's bid to meet the obligatory 100 units required for the Group 1 standard car contest. The lost parts reportedly consisted of Weber carburetors, camshafts, pistons, and limited-slip differentials. Fiat South Africa's motorsport division still completed 16 road-going models and a small number of racing and rallying cars from parts purchased on a trip to Italy, where Luigi Fincati, then the head of the division, allegedly hand-picked Fiat 131 Abarth components. Out of the 16 completed "street" cars, at least 12 known units remain roadworthy today. Pop Diedericks, one of the original racetrack drivers, retains possession of the racing unit he made famous back in the day.

The 131-2000 Racing benefited from the tweaking of the 2-liter, twin-cam Lampredi engine used in the recently launched Fiat 132 saloon. Engine modification involved the installation of two twin-choke 40 IDF carburetors to match a locally engineered inlet manifold, redesigned "banana-branch" exhaust manifolds, hot camshafts, high-compression pistons with a compression ratio of 10.2:1, modified air filters for the carburetors, and a special Abarth-developed air-intake system. The 131 Racing has a power output of 96 kW (131 PS; 129 hp) and boasts a top speed of either 186.5 or 220 km/h (116 or 137 mph), depending on the source. On the road-handling front, the car benefited from reinforced dampers and front and rear coil springs, a front stabilizer bar, and a limited-slip differential. The revised suspension system reduced the car's ride height by 30 mm. The redesign of the wheel camber reportedly gave the car "exceptional stability."

Inside, the rear and "sporty" front seats of the 131 Racing resembled the dark-red velvet units used in the lower-spec 131 Rally, which were notable for their color-coordinated vertical stripes. The Abarth "sport" steering wheel came with an adjustable steering column. On the exterior, the distinctive features of the 131 Racing included a black fiberglass bonnet and boot spoiler, an air scoop on the front bonnet, imported 6J Abarth alloy wheels mated to 185/70 SR13 tires, four quad headlights instead of the rectangular units of other two-door models, and "2000" badges on the rear fenders. According to the January 1979 edition of CAR Magazine, Fiat South Africa's initial objective was to release approximately 20 road-going 131-2000 Racing units per month to dealerships for a limited time.

== Series 2 (1978–1981) ==
The 131 got a minor facelift in 1978. New DOHC, or "Twin Cam" (TC) engines arrived, and these models were badged as Supermirafiori. Mechanically, the steering geometry was changed which resulted in less understeer and lighter steering at low speeds. The biggest changes exterior-wise for the Series 2 were larger rectangular shaped front lights (quad round headlights in the US), new bumpers (for the Supermirafiori), new bigger rear lights, while a new interior (CL, Supermirafiori) included the dashboard and a chunky, single-spoke steering wheel. This interior design by Rodolfo Bonetto was awarded with a Compasso d'Oro in 1979.

Also in 1978, the 2-door sporting version Racing (Mirafiori Sport in the UK) with 115 PS (85 kW) twin cam engine, was launched. This car had four round headlights (the inner headlights being smaller than the outer ones, unlike any other Mirafiori model produced), different grille, spoilers and extended wheel arches, and a short-throw 5 speed gearbox. The Racing had top speed of 180 km/h (110 mph). An important introduction for the Italian and many other continental European markets was the new diesel engined versions, built in Sofim's brand-new factory in Foggia. The diesel had been previewed and tested in competition already, with three diesel-engined cars prepared by Abarth for the 1977 London–Sydney Marathon rally. As introduced on the Series 2, 131 Diesels received four, equally sized round headlights and a noticeable (and characteristic) bump in the hood to accommodate the taller engine. The Familiare (estate) was renamed Panorama.

In Venezuela, the 131 Series 2 was kept in production after the Series 3 had been introduced in Europe. They were only available with the four-door sedan bodywork, as the Mirafiori L and the Mirafiori CL, and were fitted with the Panorama's OHV 1.6-liter engine with 75 PS (55 kW; 74 hp). An additional version was the sporting "131 Corsa 95", which used the 131 Racing's front spoiler, grille, rear spoiler, and other parts (still with four doors) along with the twin cam Supermirafiori engine and a sizable bonnet scoop. In Venezuela, this engine produced a claimed 95 PS (70 kW; 94 hp) at 6000 rpm.

=== Brava (USA) ===
The Series 2 was marketed in the United States as the Fiat Brava (two-door only) and Super Brava from mid-year 1978 with the same 1.8 litre four as had been used in the US-market 131, but before the year was over this was replaced by the somewhat more powerful and much torquier 2 litre twin-cam four also seen in the Spider. Initially, the better equipped models were sold as Super Bravas, but the base model and "Super" tag were dropped for 1979. The interim Brava version also retained the 131's interior. Importantly, the air conditioning system was also upgraded to cope with the demands of US drivers. For 1980 a more powerful fuel-injected version was added (102 hp or 76 kW) while the Estate version was dropped. For 1981 the EFI engine became standard equipment and the headlamps were changed for single rectangular units, but this was to be the last year for the Brava/131 in the US. The January 1991, edition of Popular Mechanics in the United States listed the 1979 Fiat 131 in the "Overall Worst" category as the most "trouble prone" car ever recorded in their Owner Report histories.

	Displacement	Engine type	Power
Mirafiori	1297/1301 cc	I4 ohv	65 PS (48 kW; 64 hp)
Supermirafiori	1297/1301 cc	I4 dohc	78 PS (57 kW; 77 hp)
Supermirafiori	1585 cc	I4 dohc	96 PS (71 kW; 95 hp)
Panorama	1297/1301 cc	I4 ohv	65 PS (48 kW; 64 hp)
Panorama	1585 cc	I4 ohv	75 PS (55 kW; 74 hp)
Diesel	1995 cc	I4	60 PS (44 kW; 59 hp)
Diesel	2445 cc	I4	72 PS (53 kW; 71 hp)
Racing	1995 cc	I4 dohc	115 PS (85 kW; 113 hp)
Brava	1756 cc	I4 dohc	83 hp (62 kW; 84 PS)
Brava	1995 cc	I4 dohc	86 hp (64 kW; 87 PS); CA: 80 hp (60 kW; 81 PS)
Brava EFI	1995 cc	I4 dohc	103 PS (76 kW; 102 hp)

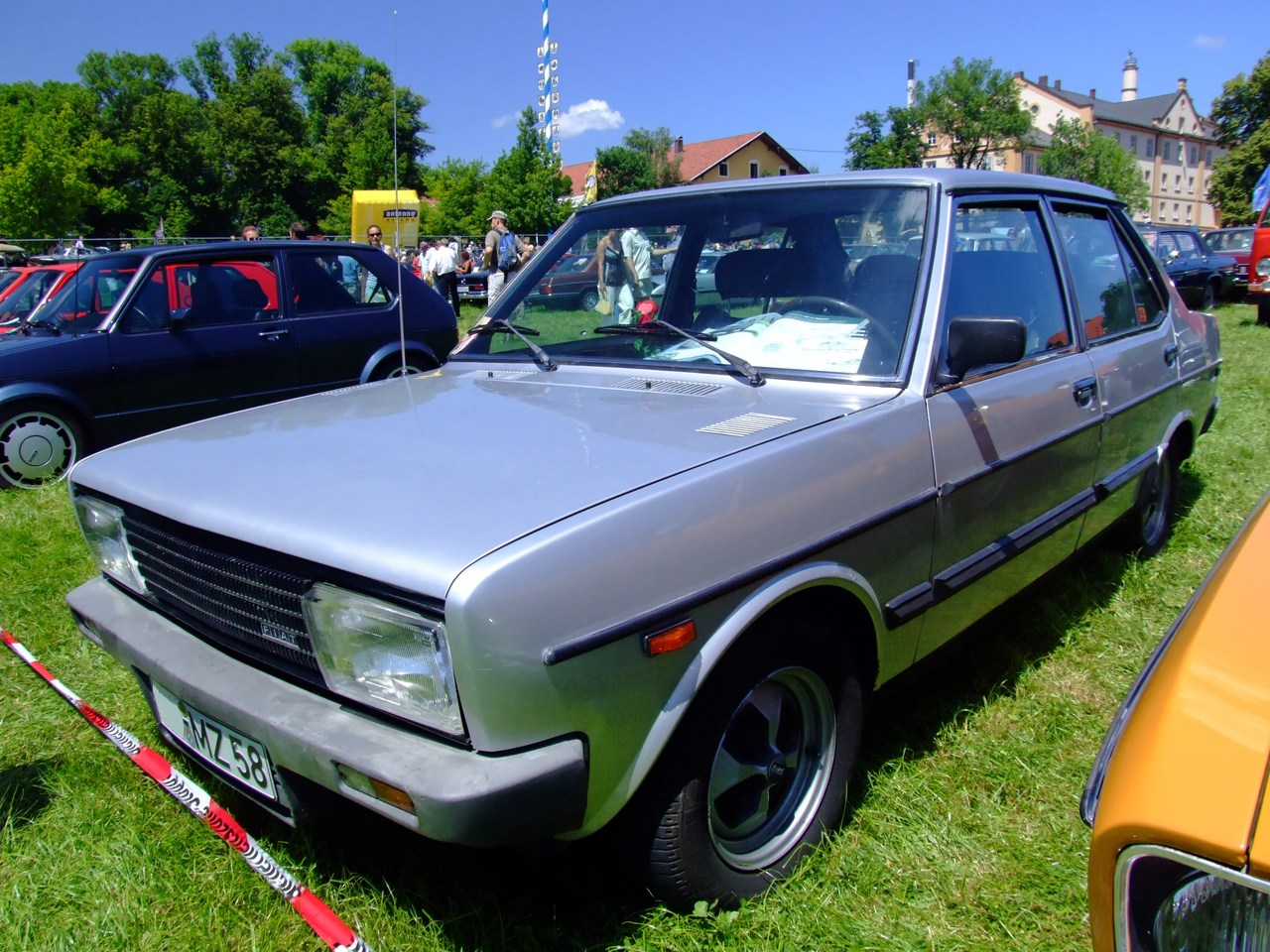
Fiat 131 Supermirafiori

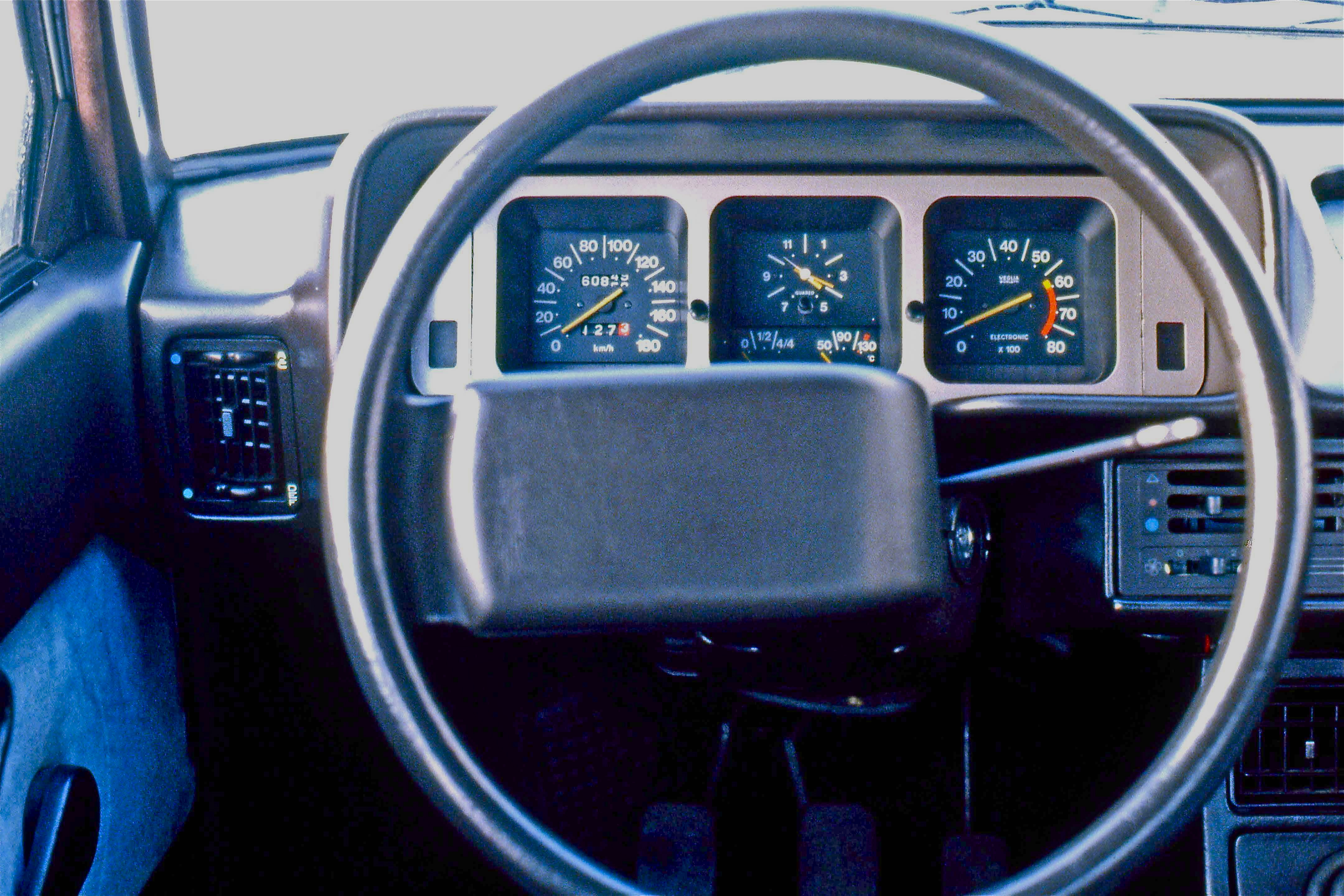
Series 2 dashboard

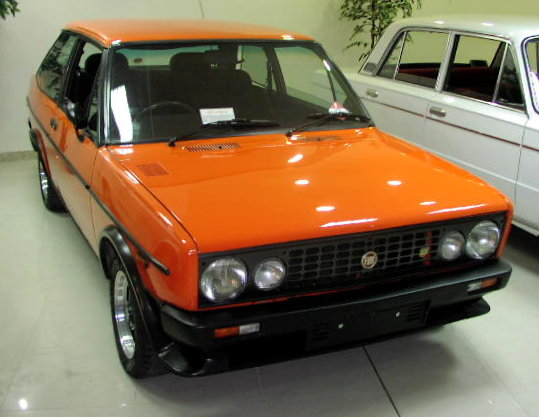
Fiat 131 Racing

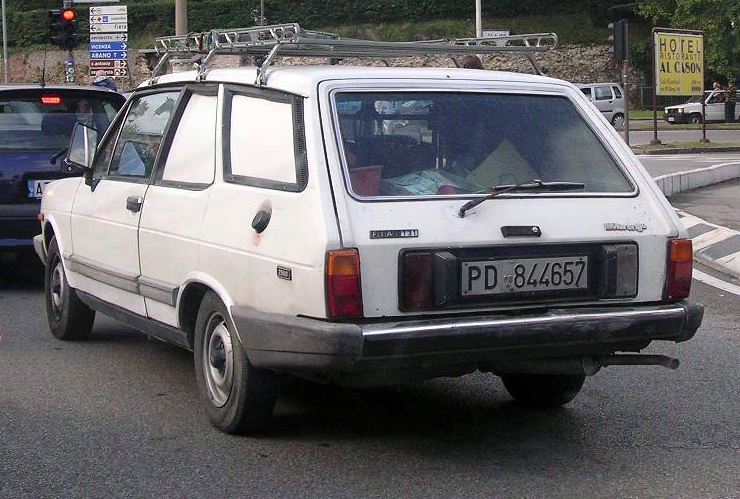
Fiat 131 Marengo, a three-door van version of the 131 Panorama estate

=== 131 Hybrid ===
In 1979, Fiat presented the 131 Ibrida, an experimental prototype featuring the small 903 cc engine from the Fiat 127, de-tuned to 33 hp (24 kW), and mated to a 24 kW DC electric motor. Power is also provided by regeneration via the braking system. The 250 amp batteries are located in the boot, adding 175 kg (386 lb) to the weight.

== Series 3 (1981–1984) ==
The 131 was updated again in March 1981. By this time, the car was no longer offered in the USA. Production of the Racing/Sport versions ceased, although these were sold well into 1982. The same 2.0 TC (twin cam) engine went to the Supermirafiori. Also the normal 2-door versions were no longer produced. The car was renamed 131 Super Brava in Australia. The car received a slightly updated interior (instruments, single-piece glovebox lid), and thanks to changes to the furniture and headliner, the passengers had more seating room: 6 cm (2.4 in) in length, 2 cm (0.79 in) in height. Central door locking and electrically operated side windows became standard for the Supermirafiori versions. Outside, lower rubbing strips found their way onto all models up to CL specification while the Supermirafiori received larger lower door cladding. On all versions the door hinges were changed to offer a larger opening angle. Mechanically, Mirafiori models now received single overhead cam engines with a balance shaft, rather than pushrod versions: a new 1.4 litre engine and a revised 1.6 litre. Also new were the clutch and gearboxes, a tweaked suspension was introduced and the gas tank increased in size by three litres, for a total 53 L (14.0 US gal; 11.7 imp gal) capacity.

In June 1981, a new sport version, the Volumetrico Abarth, was introduced to some markets, with a supercharged version of the familiar 2-litre twin-cam. This car, also known as the 2000 TC Compressore, was built in a small series (about 200 units) and could reach 190 km/h (118 mph).

In 1983, the production of the saloon version was discontinued when the Ritmo-based Regata was introduced. The estate, now named 131 Maratea, remained in production with two engine choices (115 PS 2.0 TC and 72 PS 2.5 D) until 1984, when they were replaced with the Regata Weekend. The Maratea featured four round headlights and the by-now familiar five-bar grille.

In Australia the saloon was also updated for a final time for the 1984 model year. It also received the 4 round headlight and five bar grille. Other subtle revisions were made to the vehicles wiring with the central locking button removed and integrated into central locking motors. Wheels were upgraded to a 14-inch size with unique offset. Driveshaft universal joint size was increased. Steering rack ends and tie rod ends were sizing was also changed. Brake master cylinder bore size was increased to 20mm and brake fittings changed to a metric fine thread size.

Model	Displacement	Engine type	Power
Mirafiori	1,367 cc	SOHC I4	70 PS (51 kW; 69 hp)
Mirafiori CL	1,585 cc	SOHC I4	85 PS (63 kW; 84 hp)
Supermirafiori	1,367 cc	DOHC I4	75 PS (55 kW; 74 hp)
Supermirafiori	1,585 cc	DOHC I4	98 PS (72 kW; 97 hp)
Supermirafiori	1,995 cc	DOHC I4	115 PS (85 kW; 113 hp)
Volumetrico Abarth	1,995 cc	DOHC I4	140 PS (103 kW; 138 hp)
Panorama	1,301 cc	OHV I4	65 PS (48 kW; 64 hp)
Panorama	1,585 cc	SOHC I4	85 PS (63 kW; 84 hp)
Mirafiori 2000 Diesel	1,995 cc	I4	60 PS (44 kW; 59 hp)
Mirafiori 2500 Diesel	2,445 cc	I4	72 PS (53 kW; 71 hp)
Supermirafiori 2500 Diesel	2,445 cc	I4	72 PS (53 kW; 71 hp)

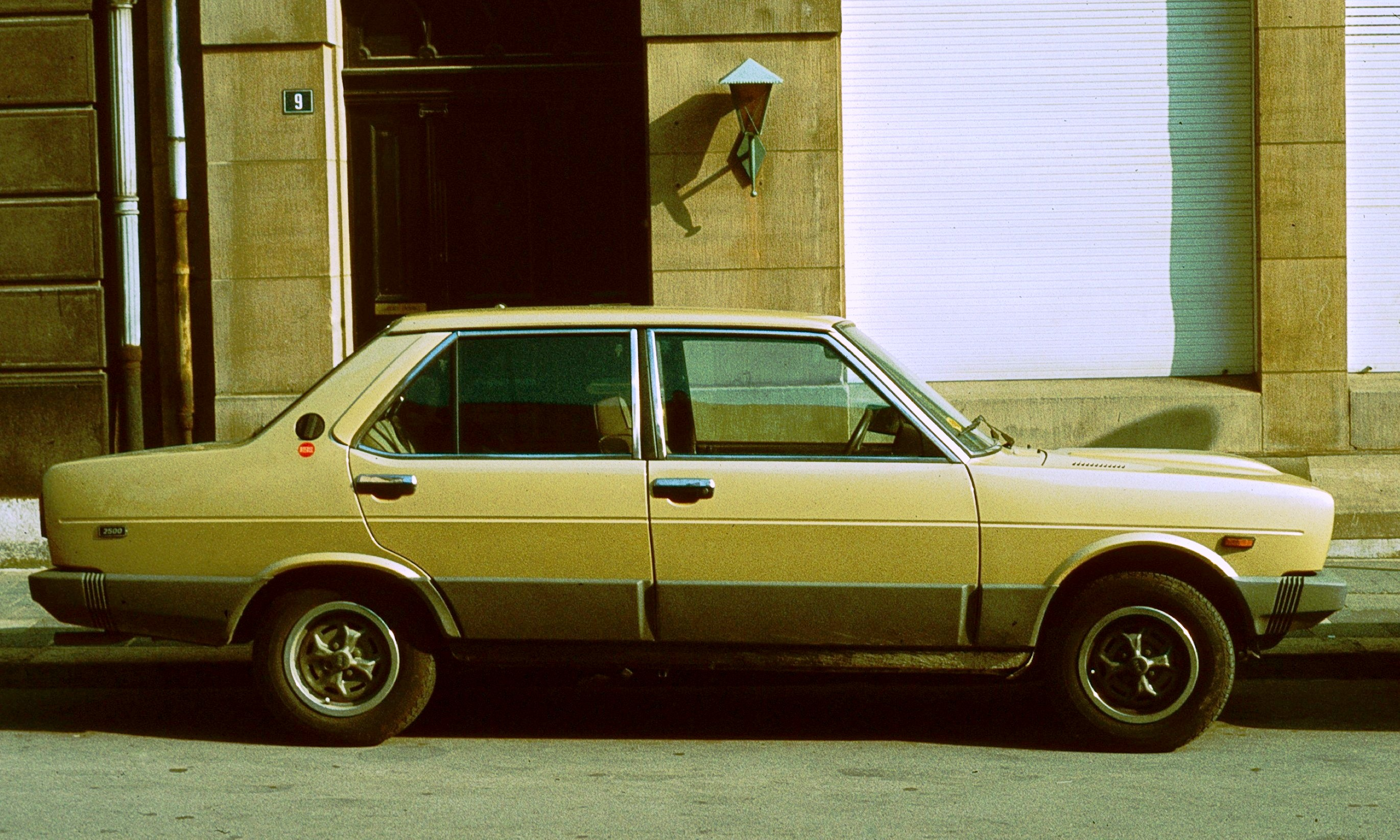
Profile of a 131 Supermirafiori Diesel 2500

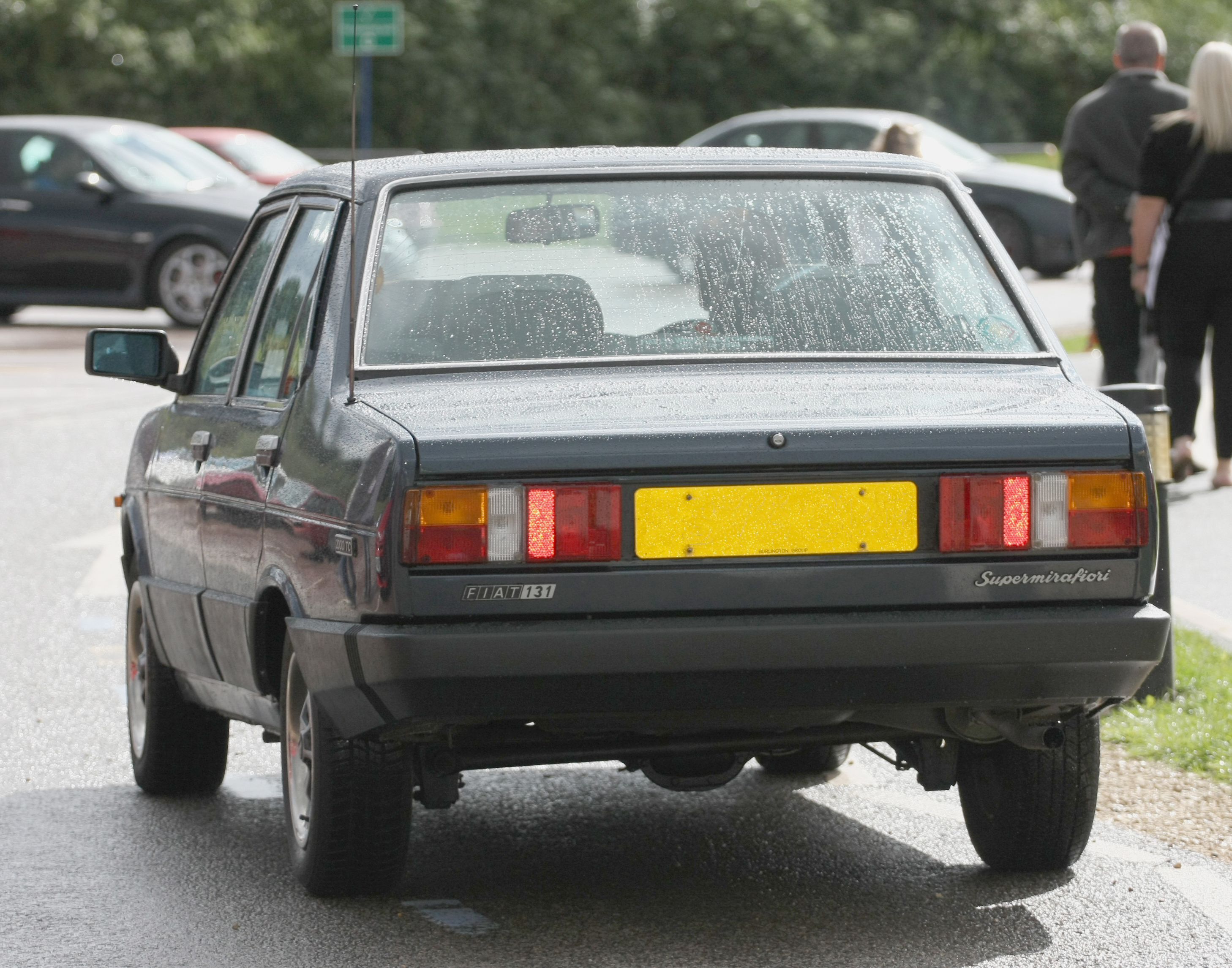
Fiat 131 Supermirafiori, series 3

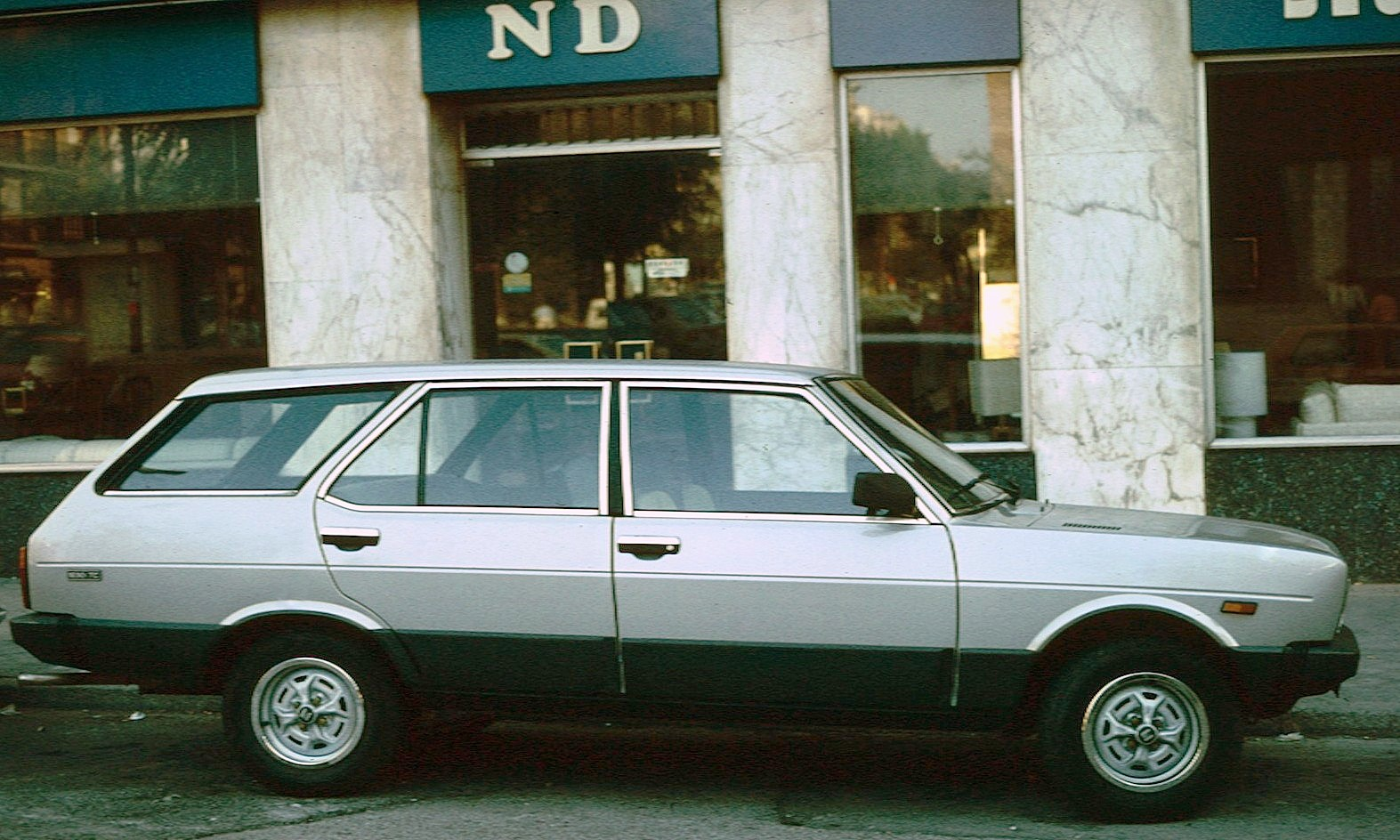
Seat Supermirafiori 131 Estate, series 3

== Motorsport ==
=== The 131 as a rally car ===
Fiat 131 Rally's precursor the 3.5-litre Group 5 Abarth SE 031 won 1975 Giro d'Italia automobilistico. The Fiat 131 Abarth was a very successful group 4 rally car, winning the manufacturers' World Rally Championship three times: in 1977, 1978, and in 1980. With this car Markku Alen won the 1978 FIA Cup for Drivers and Walter Röhrl won the 1980 drivers' World Rally Championship. Between 1976 and 1981 the Fiat 131 won 20 WRC events; other notable drivers were Sandro Munari, Timo Salonen, Attilio Bettega and Michèle Mouton.

Between 1975 and 1977 the official "works" cars carried the Olio Fiat blue and yellow livery, then during 1978 and 1979 seasons they were sponsored by Italian airline Alitalia and bore their distinctive red, white and green livery.

Prior to the introduction of the 131 Diesel, Fiat had Abarth prepare three diesel-engined cars with two-door, Series 1 bodyshells for the 1977 London–Sydney Marathon rally to promote its reliability and robustness. Entered by the French Esso Aseptogyl team, two cars finished, in 15th and 23rd place. The engines were largely unmodified, while the cars were fitted with 5-speed gearboxes and 90-litre (20 imp gal) fuel tanks.

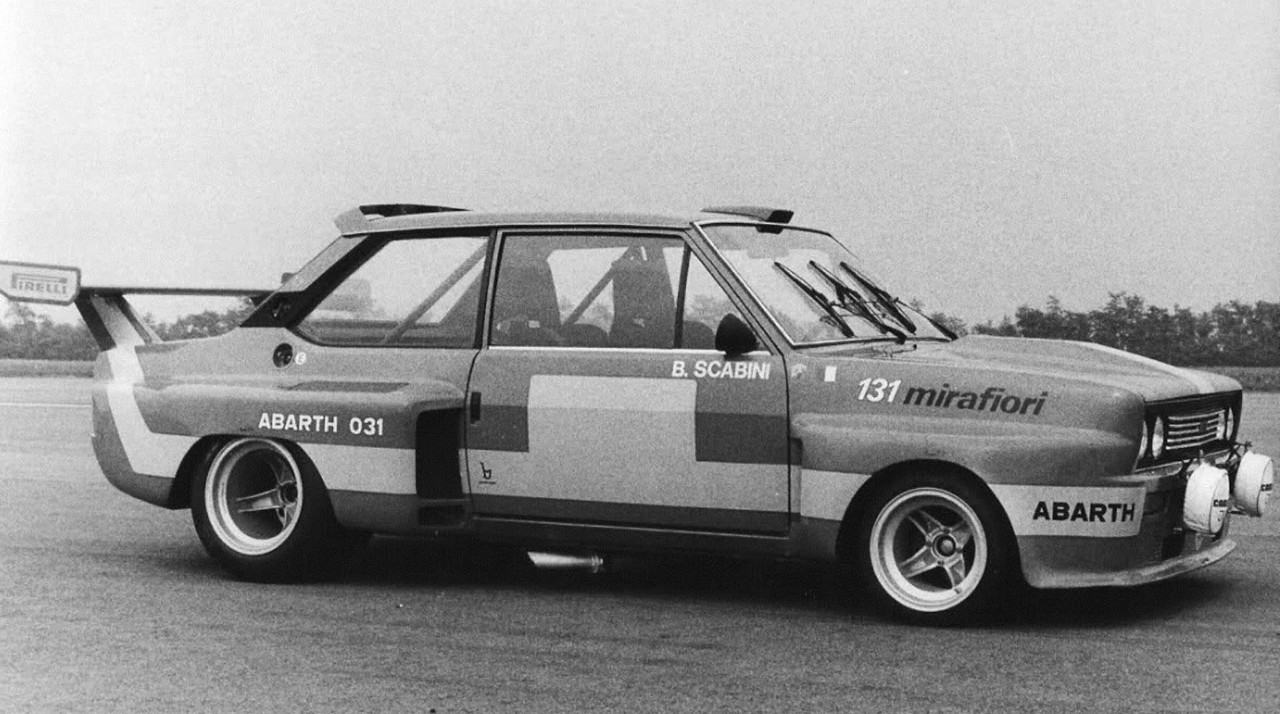
1975 "031", Fiat Abarth 131's pre-series racing prototype.

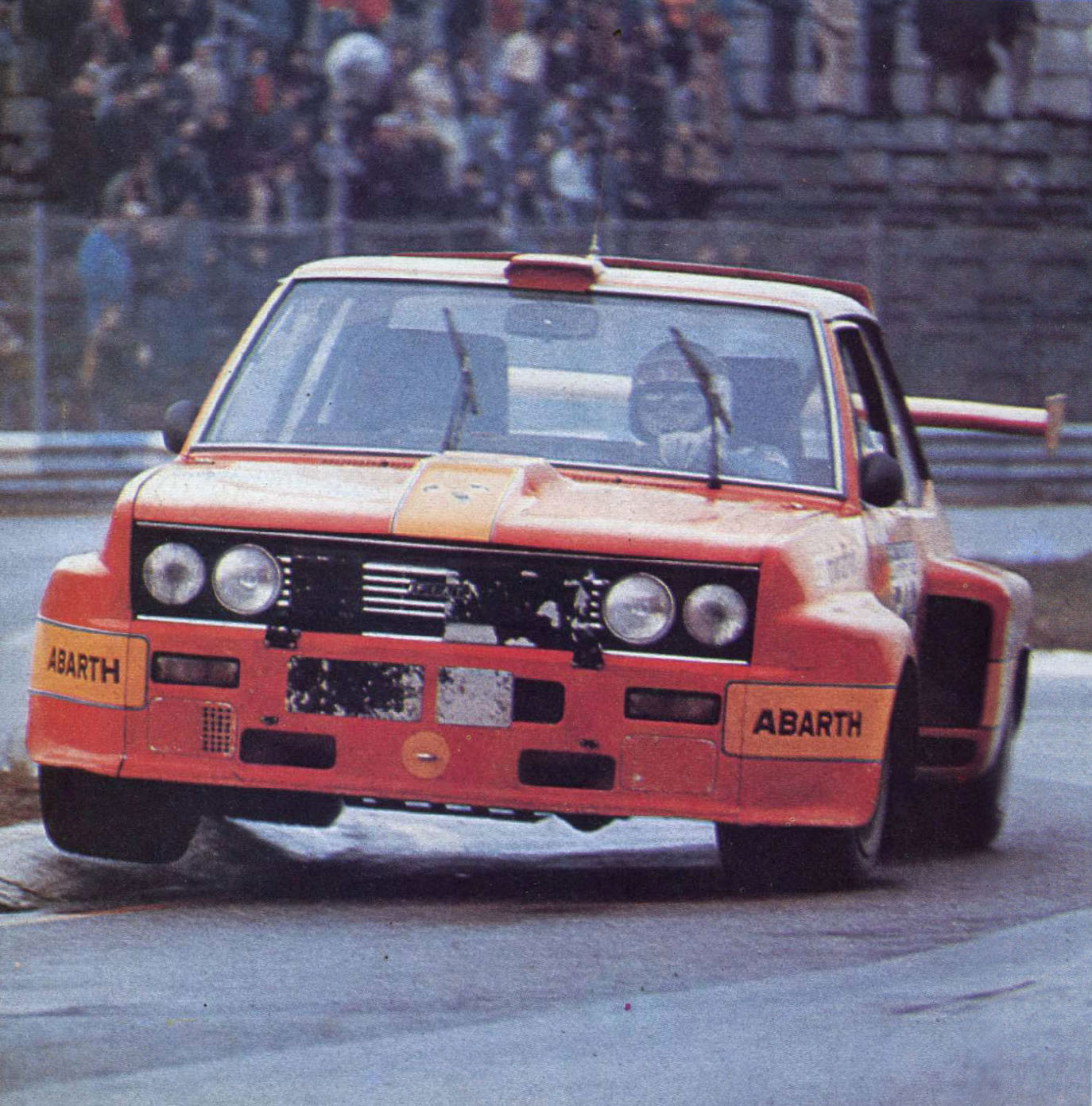
Giorgio Pianta's Fiat Abarth 031, in action at the Imola stage of 1975 Giro d'Italia.

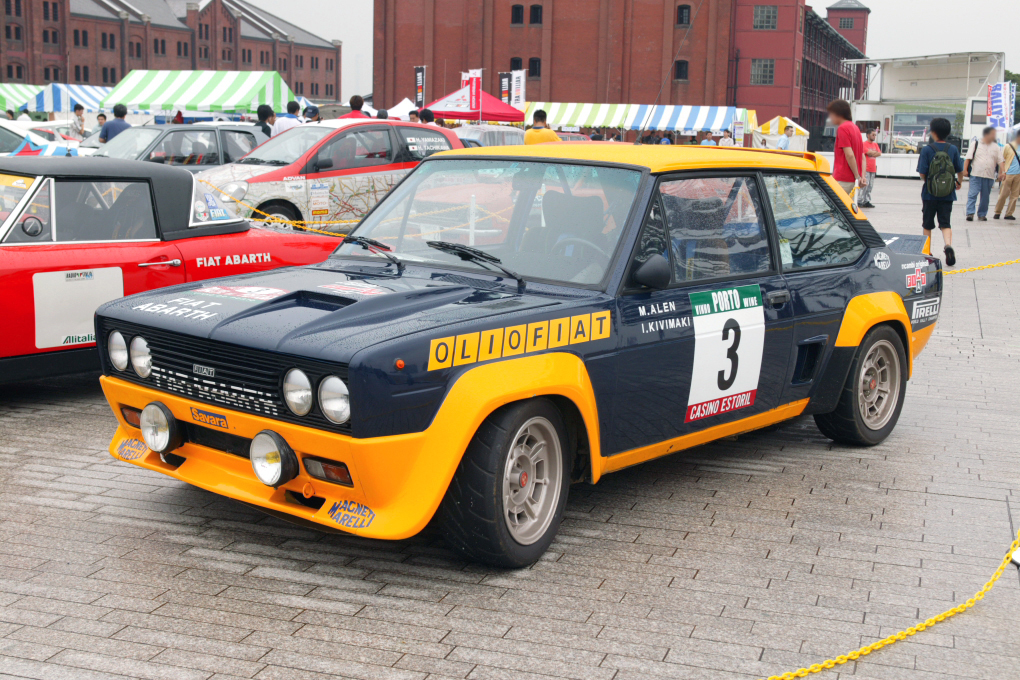
Fiat Abarth 131 rally car with "Olio Fiat" livery

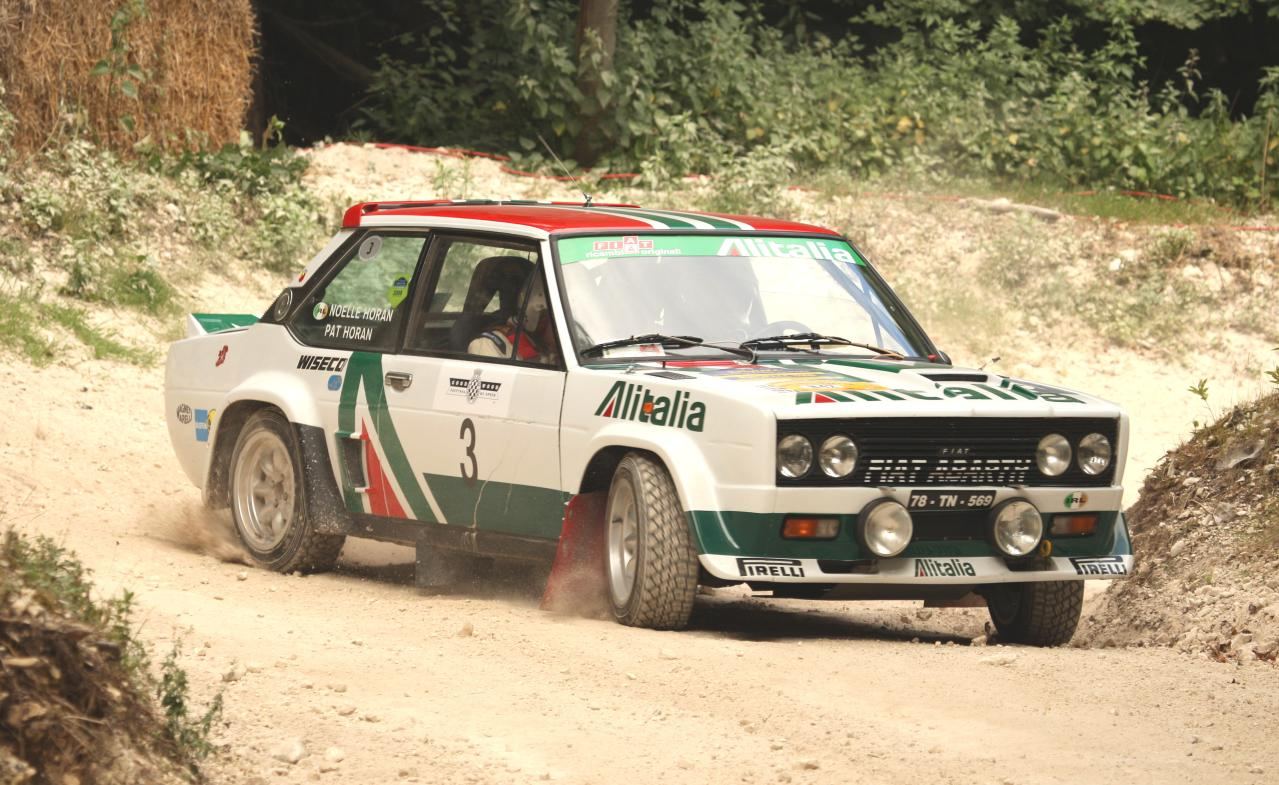
Fiat Abarth 131 rally car with "Alitalia" livery

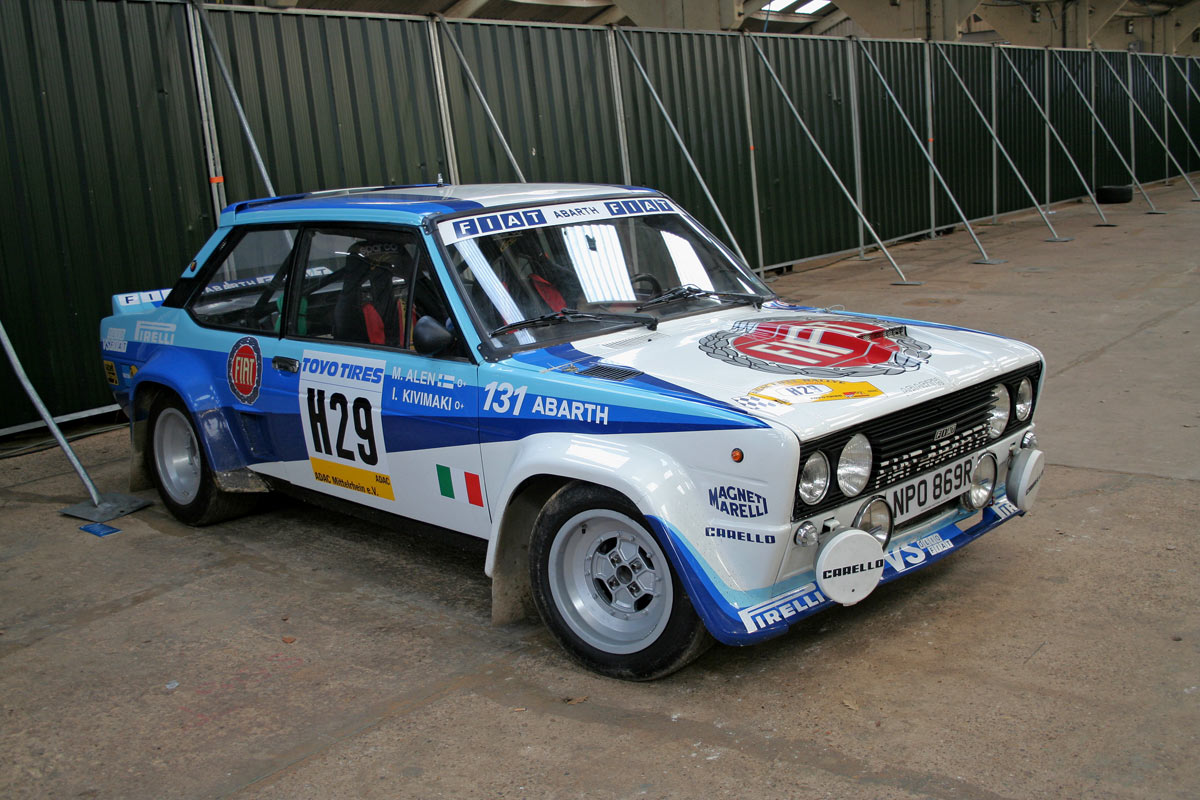
Fiat Abarth 131 rally car with "Wreath Fiat" livery

=== World Rally Championship event victories ===
Fiat Abarth 131s recorded victories in the following World Rally Championship events:

No.	Event	Season	Driver	Co-driver
1	(Finland) 26th 1000 Lakes Rally	1976	(Finland) Markku Alén	(Finland) Ilkka Kivimäki
2	10o Rallye de Portugal Vinho do Porto	1977	(Finland) Markku Alén	(Finland) Ilkka Kivimäki
3	(New Zealand) 8th South Pacific Rally	1977	(Italy) Fulvio Bacchelli	(Italy) Francesco Rossetti
4	(Canada) 5ème Critérium Molson du Québec	1977	(Finland) Timo Salonen	(Finland) Seppo Harjanne
5	(Italy) 19o Rallye Sanremo	1977	(France) Jean-Claude Andruet	(France) Christian Delferrier
6	(France) 21ème Tour de Corse	1977	(France) Bernard Darniche	(France) Alain Mahé
7	11º Rallye de Portugal Vinho do Porto	1978	(Finland) Markku Alén	(Finland) Ilkka Kivimäki
8	(Greece) 25th Acropolis Rally	1978	(Germany) Walter Röhrl	(Germany) Christian Geistdörfer
9	(Poland) 38 Rajd Polski	1978	(Spain) Antonio Zanini	(Spain) Juan Petisco
10	(Finland) 28th 1000 Lakes Rally	1978	(Finland) Markku Alén	(Finland) Ilkka Kivimäki
11	(Canada) 6ème Critérium Molson du Québec	1978	(Germany) Walter Röhrl	(Germany) Christian Geistdörfer
12	37ème Tour de France Automobile	1978	(France) Michèle Mouton	(France) Françoise Conconi
13	(France) 22ème Tour de Corse	1978	(France) Bernard Darniche	(France) Alain Mahé
14	(Finland) 29th 1000 Lakes Rally	1979	(Finland) Markku Alén	(Finland) Ilkka Kivimäki
15	(Monaco) 48ème Rallye Automobile de Monte-Carlo	1980	(Germany) Walter Röhrl	(Germany) Christian Geistdörfer
16	14o Rallye de Portugal Vinho do Porto	1980	(Germany) Walter Röhrl	(Germany) Christian Geistdörfer
17	(Argentina) 2o Rally Codasur	1980	(Germany) Walter Röhrl	(Germany) Christian Geistdörfer
18	(Finland) 30th 1000 Lakes Rally	1980	(Finland) Markku Alén	(Finland) Ilkka Kivimäki
19	(Italy) 22o Rallye Sanremo	1980	(Germany) Walter Röhrl	(Germany) Christian Geistdörfer
20	15º Rallye de Portugal Vinho do Porto	1981	(Finland) Markku Alén	(Finland) Ilkka Kivimäki

=== Other motorsports ===
In 1978, American actor James Brolin campaigned a Fiat 131 Abarth on a limited schedule in the GTU category of the IMSA GT Championship. The car carried sponsorship from Anheuser-Busch Natural Light beer, which had been introduced the previous year.

== Non-Italian 131 variations ==
As with its predecessor, there were multiple versions of the 131 produced under license from Fiat by many of its affiliates around the world with the notable exception of VAZ (Lada) in Russia who continued with its family of 124-derived models. Many of these international versions remained in production long after the 131 was discontinued by Fiat in its main Western European market.

=== SEAT 131 ===
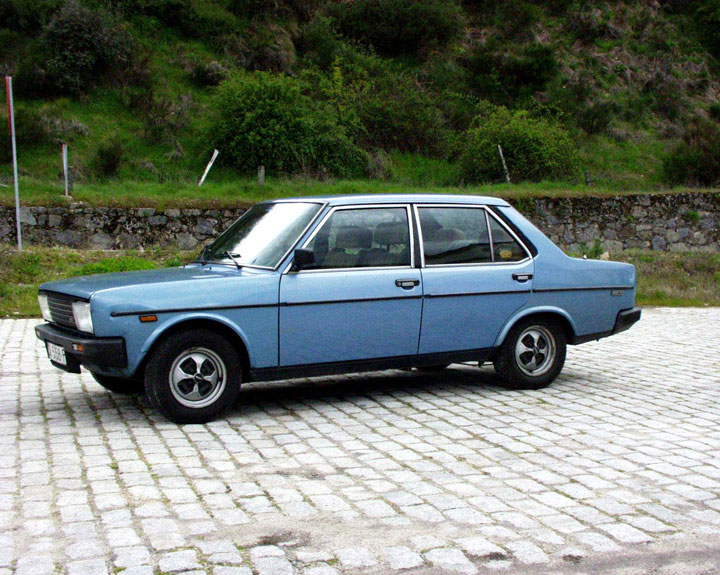
1980 SEAT 131, Salamanca, Spain

The SEAT 131 started its production in early 1975 in Barcelona with two versions initially offered: SEAT 131 L, featuring rectangular front lamps, 1,438 cc OHC engine and 4 speed gearbox and SEAT 131 E featuring four round headlamps, 1,592 cc DOHC engine and 5 speed gearbox. The range grew up in 1976 with the SEAT 131 Familiar, estate version offered with both engines. In 1977 the 131 Automatico (Automatic gearbox) was released and the following year a very short production of the SEAT 131 CLX 1800 was offered.

In 1978, the SEAT 131 evolved into the SEAT 131 Mirafiori/Supermirafiori (Panorama for the estate versions), with the same changes as seen on its Italian cousin. The engines remained largely the same, but a 1.8 litre Diesel Perkins 4.108 engine was available in 1979.

A further CLX special edition was launched in 1980. Available only in metallic silver or metallic bronze colours, this 131 CLX had a 1,919 cc engine, developing 114 PS (84 kW) at 5,800 rpm.

In 1981, the Diesel version was developed with a new Sofim engine. This 2,500 cc engine was much more powerful than the Perkins version (72 hp against only 49 hp) and was one of the most successful taxis in early '80s Spain.

In 1982, the SEAT 131 changed again, gathering all the body changes seen on the Fiat 131 series 3. The 131 was now available in CL, Supermirafiori and Diplomatic versions. The Diplomatic was the top of the range, with a 1,995 cc engine and features such as power steering, power windows or air conditioning. The Panorama versions were the cars chosen by the "Cuerpo Nacional de Policia" (Spanish Police force) as patrol cars.

In 1984, the SEAT 131 range was discontinued, without a direct substitute and the Fiat Ritmo-based SEAT Málaga took its place in 1985.

=== Murat 131 ===
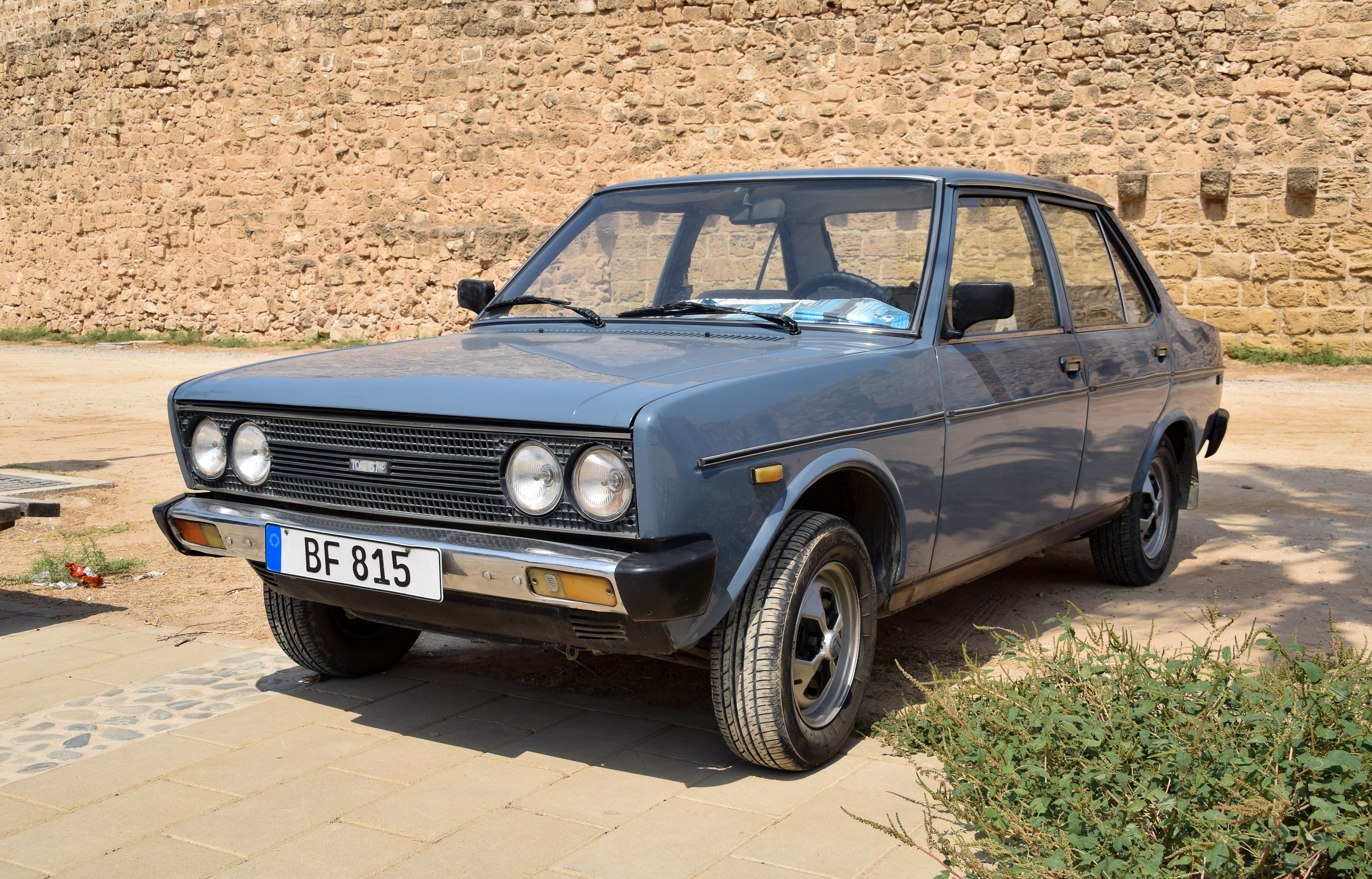
Murat 131 Şahin

Turkish Automotive Factories Incorporated (Tofaş) in Turkey started the production of Fiat 131s in Bursa, built under Fiat license, with the Murat 131 (Turkish: Desire) nameplate. The Murat 131 was then joined by three veriants with bird names: Şahin ("Hawk"), the better equipped Doğan ("Falcon), and an estate version called the Kartal ("Eagle"). These vehicles enjoyed a very long production run including one major facelift (1977–2002 in Turkey, 1991–2009 in Egypt, 2006–2010 in Ethiopia).

=== Polski Fiat 131p ===
Assembly of the 131 sedan was also undertaken in Poland by Fabryka Samochodów Osobowych (FSO) in the years 1975 to 1981, and 3102 were assembled in total. They were often used by state institutions and communist party officials. First series cars were available only in Special trim and were called Polski Fiat 131p Mirafiori. Cars of second series were known under the name Fiat 131p Mirafiori and were offered in L and CL trim levels.

=== Other producers ===
The Fiat 131 was also produced at Helwan, in Egypt, by El Nasr since at least 1982, on the basis of complete knockdown (CKD) kits. This was followed by CKD assembly of the Tofaş Murat 131 between 1991 and 2009. The Tofaş Murat 131 has also been assembled in Ethiopia by Holland Car between 2006 and 2010.

Other CKD production of the Fiat 131 has taken place in the following countries:

- Córdoba; Argentina, FIAT Córdoba.
- Bogotá, Colombia; (Compañía Colombiana Automotriz).
- San José, Costa Rica (S.A.V.A.).
- Jakarta, Indonesia (P.T. Daha Motor, Saloon and Station Wagon).
- Kuala Lumpur, Malaysia.
- Casablanca, Morocco (SOMACA).
- Lisbon, Portugal (Fiat Portuguesa SARL, Somave Sarl)
- Singapore (Sharikat Fiat Distributors).
- Bangkok, Thailand (Karnasuta General Assembly Co.).
- Caracas, Venezuela (FIAT de Venezuela C.A.).
- Livingstone, Zambia (Livingstone Motor Assemblers Ltd)

== See also ==
- Fiat Marengo
