= Hassi Lahdjar =

- Village
- Location within Algeria
- Coordinates: 27°16′39″N 2°35′9″E
- Country: Algeria
- Province: Tamanrasset Province
- District: In Salah District
- Commune: In Salah
- Elevation: 279 m (915 ft)
- Time zone: UTC+1 (CET)

Hassi Lahdjar (also written Hassi El Hadjar) is a village in the commune of In Salah, in In Salah District, Tamanrasset Province, Algeria. It is located 14 kilometres (8.7 mi) northeast of the town of In Salah.
