= World Cup Rally =

Intercontinental motor rally competition

The World Cup Rally was the name of eight intercontinental motor rally competitions.

== History ==
The event drew inspiration from the successful London-Sydney Marathon rallies, which had been held most recently in 1968. Organised by Wylton Dickson, the World Cup Rallies were named for and celebrated the FIFA World Cup association football tournaments. Each rally started in London and raced to the World Cup host city; Mexico City in 1970 and Munich in 1974. With Munich being relatively close to London, the rally was routed southwards into Africa, reaching as far south as Nigeria.

The first two events were:

- 1970 London to Mexico World Cup Rally
- 1974 London-Sahara-Munich World Cup Rally

The 1970 event was a success with over a hundred competitors starting and many automobile manufacturers entering professional teams. The rally was won by a factory supported Ford Escort driven by Finnish driver Hannu Mikkola and Swedish co-driver (navigator) Gunnar Palm.

The 1974 event, held in the immediate wake of the 1973 oil crisis, was less successful, with only two factory supported teams and the majority of the front running cars being privateer entrants. The second event was additionally blighted by an error in the navigational notes which saw the majority of the field become lost in the Algerian Sahara desert. The rally was won by the privateer Citroën DS of Australian drivers Jim Reddiex, Ken Tubman and Andre Welinski, who was a veteran of the 1968 London-Sydney Marathon.

The 1974 event's first ever journey across the Sahara planted the seed that would become the Dakar Rally in 1980.

The race continued to be held sporadically.
