= Igostène =

- Village
- Location within Algeria
- Coordinates: 22°37′32″N 5°27′18″E
- Country: Algeria
- Province: Tamanrasset Province
- District: Tamanrasset District
- Commune: Tamanrasset
- Elevation: 1,205 m (3,953 ft)
- Time zone: UTC+1 (CET)

Igostène is a village in the commune of In Salah, in Tamanrasset District, Tamanrasset Province, Algeria. It is located 16 kilometres (9.9 mi) east of the town of In Salah.
