= In Salah =

Place in In Salah Province, Algeria

Ain Salah إن صالح Aïn Salah; ʿĪn Ṣalāḥ; ʿAyn Ṣalāḥ
- Commune and town
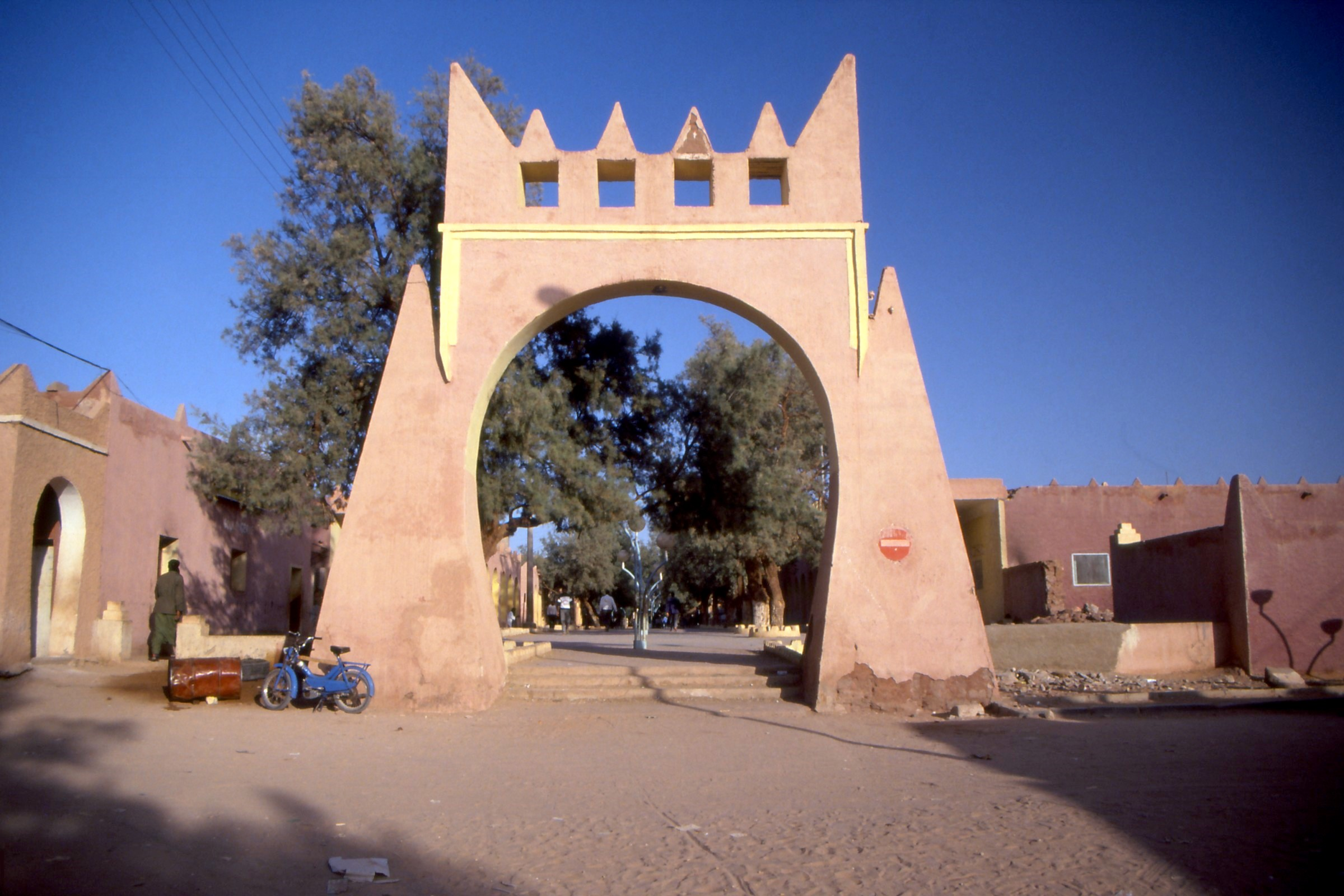
- City gate of Ain Salah.

- Location of In Salah commune within In Salah Province

- Location of In Salah within Algeria
- Coordinates: 27°11′42″N 2°29′0″E
- Country: Algeria
- Province: In Salah Province
- District: In Salah District

Area
  - Total: 32,518 km^{2} (12,555 sq mi)
- Elevation: 293 m (961 ft)

Population (2008)
  - Total: 32,518
  - Density: 1.0000/km^{2} (2.5900/sq mi)
- Time zone: UTC+1 (CET)
- PMA seats (as of 2007): 11
- ONS code: 1108
- Postal code: 11220

Ain Salah, officially Aïn Salah (Algerian Arabic: عين صالح, romanized: ʿīn ṣalāḥ), is an oasis town in central Algeria and the capital of In Salah Province and In Salah District. It was once an important trade link in the trans-Saharan caravan route. As of the 2008 census, it had a population of 32,518, up from 28,022 in 1998, with an annual growth rate of 1.5%, the lowest in the province. The village is located in the heart of the Sahara in North Africa. The name In Salah means "good well".

== Geography ==
A creeping dune on the western edge of town is advancing on the city, cutting In Salah in half. The dune is moving at a speed of approximately one meter (three feet) every five years. As buildings are covered by its leading edge, structures at the back of the dune are being gradually uncovered. When a formerly covered location at the back of the dune once again becomes free, it is established who the past owners were and the building is restored and moved into by relatives. Four red or violet clay brick ksur (walled towns) are in the oasis, each having its own citadel.

== Climate ==
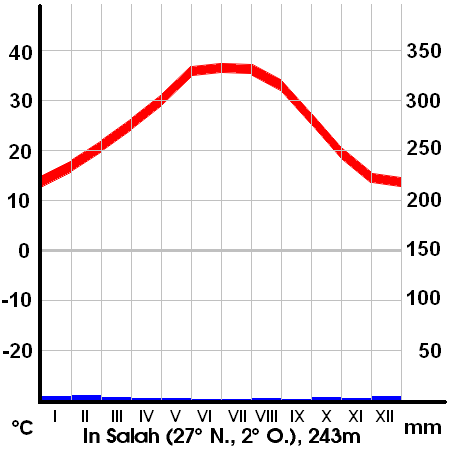
Climate in Salah

In Salah has a hot desert climate (Köppen climate classification BWh), with long, extremely hot summers and short, warm winters, and averages just 16 mm (0.63 inches) of rainfall per year. Summer temperatures are consistently high as they commonly approach 50 °C (122 °F) but temperatures at night fall low enough to around 30 °C (86 °F). The high temperature of 49.8 °C (121.6 °F) was registered on 29 July 2018. Even in early May or in late September, daytime temperatures can easily soar to 45 °C (113 °F). The Sahara region of Algeria is the source of a scorching, sometimes dusty and southerly wind called the Sirocco which parches the plateaus of northern Algeria for up to 40 days and reaches the Tell coastal region for as many as 20 days. During winter, nights can be chilly and frost is by no means unknown but the days are pleasantly warm, sunny and dry. In Salah has recorded at least 35 °C (95 °F) in every month of the year including January and December as the absolute records high temperatures are respectively 35 °C (95 °F) and 36 °C (97 °F) for these two months. The absolute records low temperatures are below the freezing point, with −4 °C (25 °F) recorded in January and −1 °C (30 °F) recorded in both February and December, although freezing temperatures are very rare and don't occur each year. Average annual relative humidity is low at 32%. The sky is clear all year and cloudy days are very rare. Thereby, the solar irradiation is among the highest found on the planet and the annual sunshine duration is estimated between 3,700 h and 4,000 h. In Salah is often quoted as one of the hottest spots worldwide. With Adrar and Reggane, In Salah forms the "Triangle of Fire" as local inhabitants say due to the extreme desert heat that bakes the region from May to September.

Climate data for In Salah (27º11'42"N, 02º29'00"E, 293 m AMSL) (1991–2020 normals and extremes)
Month	Jan	Feb	Mar	Apr	May	Jun	Jul	Aug	Sep	Oct	Nov	Dec	Year
Record high °C (°F)	35.1 (95.2)	39.0 (102.2)	41.9 (107.4)	46.0 (114.8)	47.1 (116.8)	49.3 (120.7)	50.6 (123.1)	49.3 (120.7)	47.7 (117.9)	44.2 (111.6)	38.8 (101.8)	32.9 (91.2)	50.6 (123.1)
Mean daily maximum °C (°F)	22.1 (71.8)	24.9 (76.8)	29.7 (85.5)	34.6 (94.3)	39.4 (102.9)	44.0 (111.2)	46.1 (115.0)	44.9 (112.8)	41.9 (107.4)	35.6 (96.1)	27.9 (82.2)	23.1 (73.6)	34.5 (94.1)
Daily mean °C (°F)	14.4 (57.9)	17.1 (62.8)	21.6 (70.9)	26.2 (79.2)	31.2 (88.2)	35.7 (96.3)	38.2 (100.8)	37.5 (99.5)	34.3 (93.7)	28.1 (82.6)	20.4 (68.7)	15.8 (60.4)	26.7 (80.1)
Mean daily minimum °C (°F)	6.8 (44.2)	9.3 (48.7)	13.4 (56.1)	17.8 (64.0)	23.0 (73.4)	27.5 (81.5)	30.4 (86.7)	30.1 (86.2)	26.8 (80.2)	20.6 (69.1)	12.9 (55.2)	8.4 (47.1)	18.9 (66.0)
Record low °C (°F)	−3.0 (26.6)	−3.9 (25.0)	1.0 (33.8)	7.1 (44.8)	11.3 (52.3)	17.0 (62.6)	22.1 (71.8)	22.6 (72.7)	16.9 (62.4)	9.5 (49.1)	0.8 (33.4)	−1.3 (29.7)	−3.9 (25.0)
Average precipitation mm (inches)	2.9 (0.11)	1.0 (0.04)	1.4 (0.06)	1.3 (0.05)	0.8 (0.03)	1.2 (0.05)	0.1 (0.00)	0.6 (0.02)	1.4 (0.06)	1.4 (0.06)	1.4 (0.06)	0.5 (0.02)	14.0 (0.55)
Average precipitation days (≥ 1.0 mm)	0.3	0.3	0.3	0.2	0.2	0.2	0.0	0.1	0.5	0.4	0.3	0.1	2.9
Average relative humidity (%)	42	37	31	28	28	25	23	25	29	33	40	44	32
Mean monthly sunshine hours	276.4	254.9	284.1	292.7	308.8	314.7	378.2	322.9	267.9	278.0	265.4	265.6	3,509.6
Percentage possible sunshine	84	80	76	76	74	76	89	80	73	78	82	82	79
Source 1: NOAA (1991–2020 normals and extremes)
Source 2: Arab Meteorology Book (July sun)

== Transport ==
Air flights via In Salah Airport connect the town with the capital Algiers and other major cities in Algeria. The bus station of In Salah hosts buses going to the north and south. There is a hotel, a restaurant, an internet cafe and two camping sites located in the city and surrounding area. The town lies at the junction of the Trans-Sahara Highway (also known as the N1 national highway), which leads north to Ghardaïa and Algiers and south to Tamanrasset, and the N52, which leads west to In Ghar and Reggane.

== Economy ==
Satellite image of In Salah. The oasis is at the center of the image while the city is at top-right. The dark areas are agricultural areas.

Aside from oil and gas reserves, the primary economic activities of In Salah are agricultural in nature with irrigation being supplied by artesian wells. The oasis has over 200,000 date palms. The chief produce are dates, fruits and vegetables. Fruit and vegetable gardens, as well as palm groves, flank the village on its southern and western edges. These groves are protected from the always advancing sand by hedges. In Salah is also a centre for nomadic Tuareg. The In Salah oil and gas fields are home to the In Salah Project, a major component of which includes a facility to remove CO_{2} from the gas produced. The CO_{2} is then re-injected into an underground formation.

Historically, In Salah was formerly a trading town which dealt in slaves, ivory and gold from the south. These goods were exchanged with European goods from the north.

In February 2016, BP announced further project start up at In Salah Southern Fields. In Salah Gas, a joint venture between Sonatrach, BP and Statoil today announced the start-up of its Southern Fields project. In Salah Gas was the first project in the world to be environmentally certified to the ISO 14001 standard. The ISO 14001 management system development and implementation was conducted by Sonni Gopal.

== Education ==
6.7% of the population has a tertiary education (the highest rate in the province), and another 20.1% has completed secondary education. The overall literacy rate is 80.1%, and is 88.7% among males and 71.4% among females.

== Localities ==
The commune is composed of 11 localities:

- In Salah
- Ksar Laarab
- Ksar Lemrabtine
- Deghamcha
- El Barka
- Igostène
- Hassi Lahdjar
- Ez Zaouia H. Sidi Belkacem
- Sahla Tahtania
- Sahla Fougania
- Tadjemout
