= In Salah District =

In Salah District دائرة عين صالح
- District
- Coordinates: 27°12′N 2°49′E
- Country: Algeria
- Province: In Salah
- District seat: In Salah

Area
  - Total: 105,251 km^{2} (40,638 sq mi)

Population (2008)
  - Total: 39,167
  - Density: 0.37213/km^{2} (0.96381/sq mi)
- Time zone: UTC+01 (CET)
- Municipalities: 2

In Salah is a district in In Salah Province, Algeria. It was named after its capital, In Salah. According to the 2008 census, it has a population of 39,167.

== Municipalities ==
The district is further divided into 2 municipalities:

- In Salah
- Foggaret Ezzaouia
