= Opel Ascona =

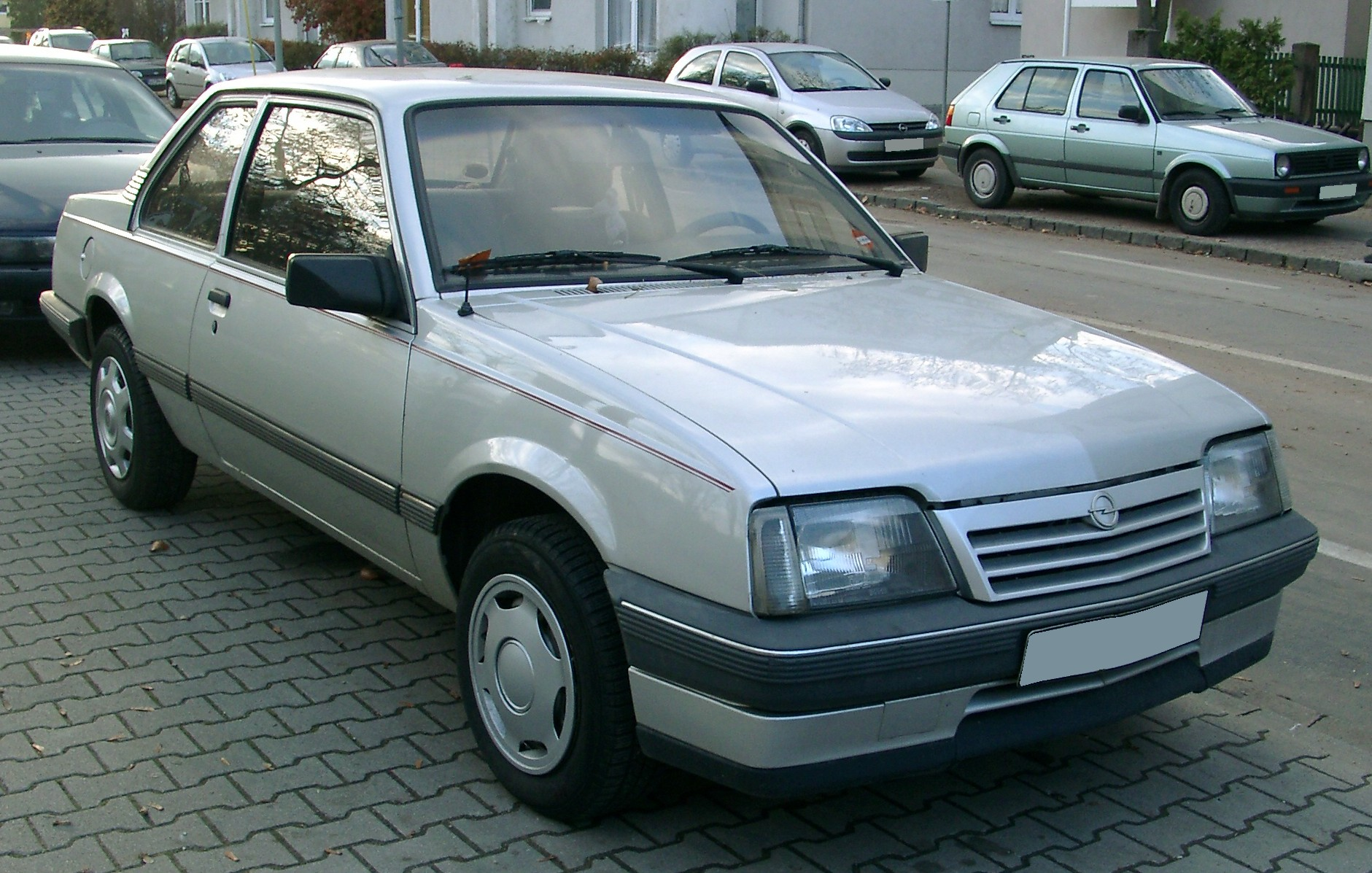

Overview
- Manufacturer: Opel (General Motors)
- Production: 1970–1988

Body and chassis
- Class: Large family car (D)
- Related: Vauxhall Cavalier; Holden Camira; Isuzu Aska

Chronology
- Successor: Opel Vectra

The Opel Ascona is a large family car (D-segment in Europe) that was produced by the German automaker Opel from 1970 to 1988. It was produced in three separate generations, beginning with rear-wheel-drive and ending up as a front-wheel drive J-car derivative. The Ascona was developed to fill the gap in the Opel range as the Opel Rekord was gradually growing in size.

The Ascona took its name from the lakeside resort of that name in Ticino, Switzerland, and already in the 1950s a special edition of the Opel Rekord P1 was sold as an Opel Ascona in Switzerland, where the name was again used in 1968 for a locally adapted version of the Opel Kadett B into which the manufacturers had persuaded a 1.7-litre engine borrowed from the larger Rekord model of the time. The Opel Ascona A launched in 1970 and sold across Europe was, however, the first mainstream Opel model to carry the name — departing from Opel's long standing convention of using German naval rank designations for its models.

The Ascona was introduced in September 1970, lasting for 18 years and 3 generations and ended production in August 1988, to be replaced by the Opel Vectra A. The second and third generations of the Ascona were developed as global platforms by Opel's then parent General Motors, with various derivative versions manufactured by other GM divisions around the world.

In motorsport, Walter Röhrl won the 1982 World Rally Championship drivers' title with an Ascona 400.

== Ascona A (1970–1975) ==
Ascona A
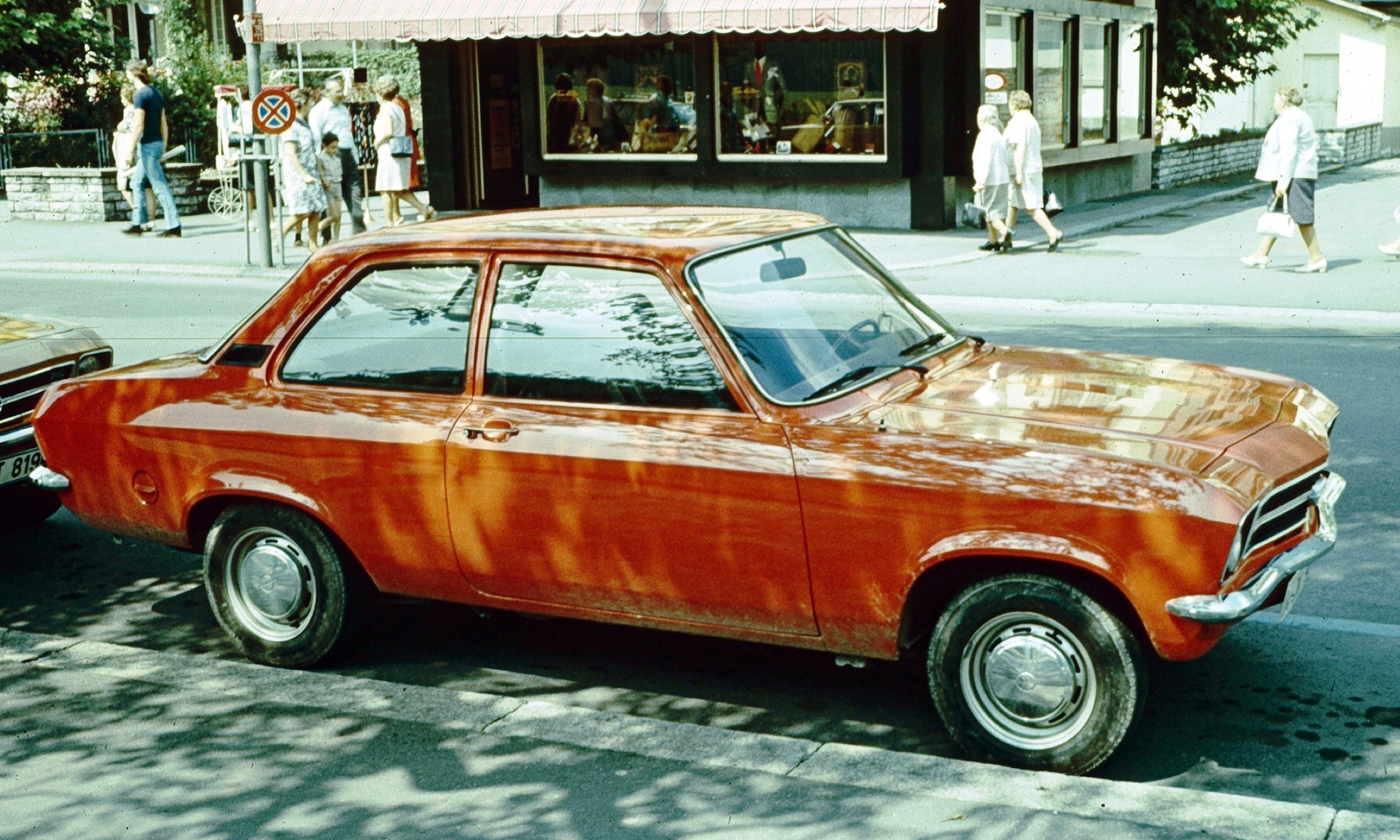

Overview
- Also called: Opel 1900 (USA)
- Production: 1970–1975
- Assembly: Germany: Bochum
- Designer: Chuck Jordan

Body and chassis
- Body style: 2/4-door saloon 3-door estate
- Layout: FR layout

Powertrain
- Engine: 1196 cc 12S OHV I4; 1584 cc 16N/16S CIH I4; 1897 cc 19S CIH I4
- Transmission: 4-speed manual; 3-speed automatic

Dimensions
- Wheelbase: 95.75 in (2,432 mm)
- Length: 164.5 in (4,178 mm)
- Width: 64.375 in (1,635 mm)
- Height: 54.5 in (1,384 mm)

In the fall of 1970, Opel presented its completely new vehicle range in Rüsselsheim (internal project code 1.450). The Opel Manta coupé was launched on September 9, followed by the Opel Ascona on October 28 in two- and four-door saloon forms, plus a three-door estate called the Caravan or Voyage. These models were positioned between the existing Opel Kadett and the Opel Rekord, and unlike later Asconas — there was no Vauxhall sister model.

The Ascona was developed as a replacement to the Kadett, but late in the car's development Opel chose to instead develop a new, smaller Kadett and instead positioned the Ascona as a competitor to the successful Ford mid-sized Taunus range. The Opel Ascona A stayed in production until 1975. By that time, almost 692,000 vehicles of the first series had been produced.

The range featured petrol engines from 1.2 L to 1.9 L, with power between 60 and 90 PS (44 and 66 kW). The 1.2 L had an overhead valve (OHV) head, while the 1.6 L and 1.9 L featured the Opel cam-in-head engine (CIH). The CIH was a compromise effort, with the camshaft mounted next to the valves rather than above them. All used a single barrel carburetor. Even with this simple design, the Ascona 1.9 SR had a successful career in motorsports, with Walter Röhrl winning the European Rally Championship in 1974. Tuner Steinmetz developed a special version of the Ascona SR, with two single-barrel Solex carburettors, raising power to 125 PS (92 kW).

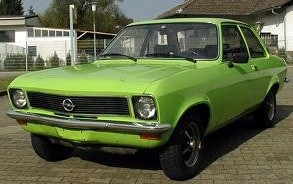
Opel Ascona (1973–1975)

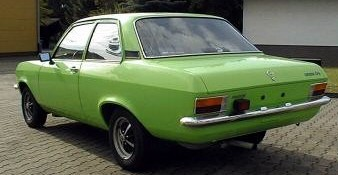
Rear view

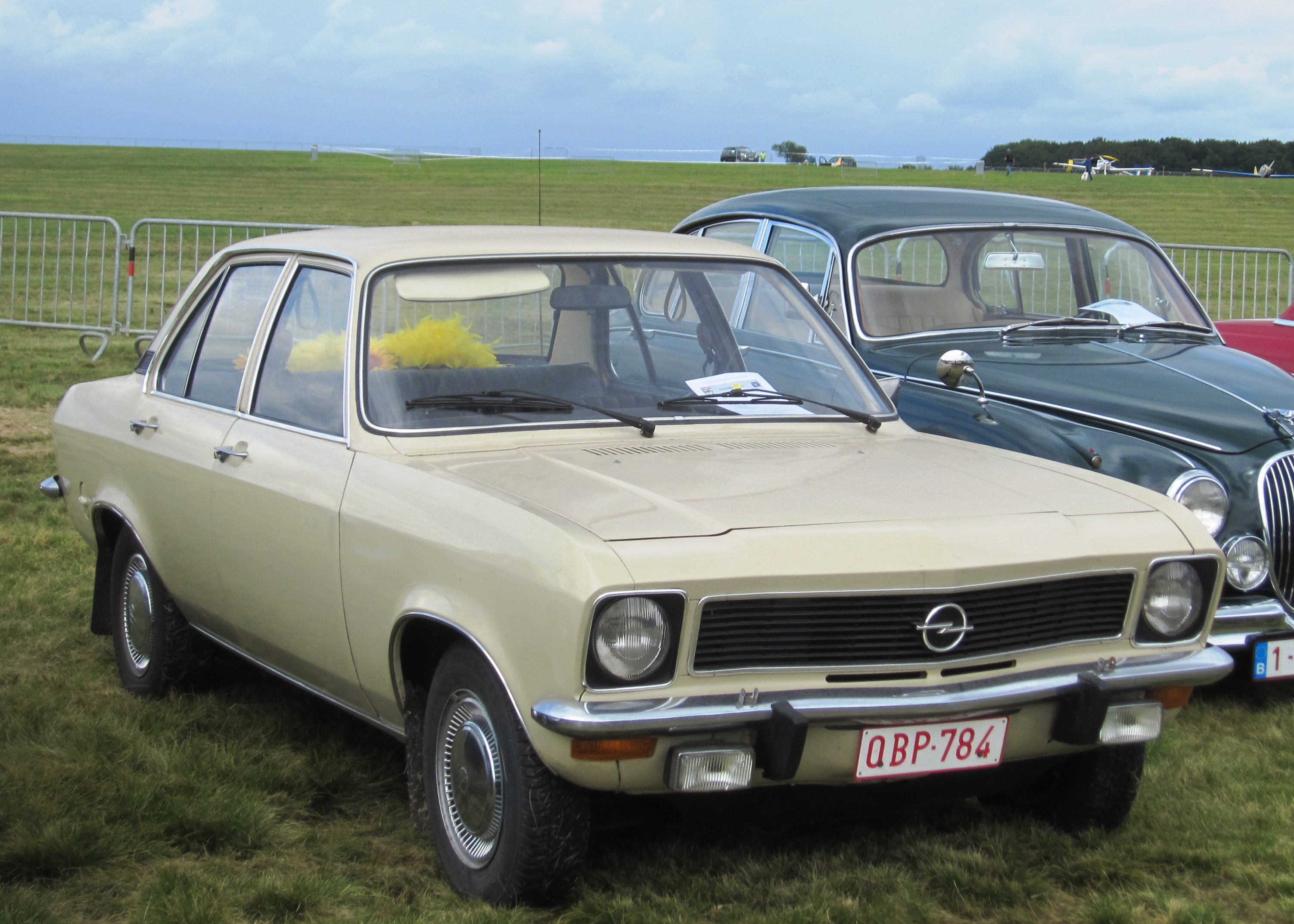
Opel Ascona A 4-door saloon

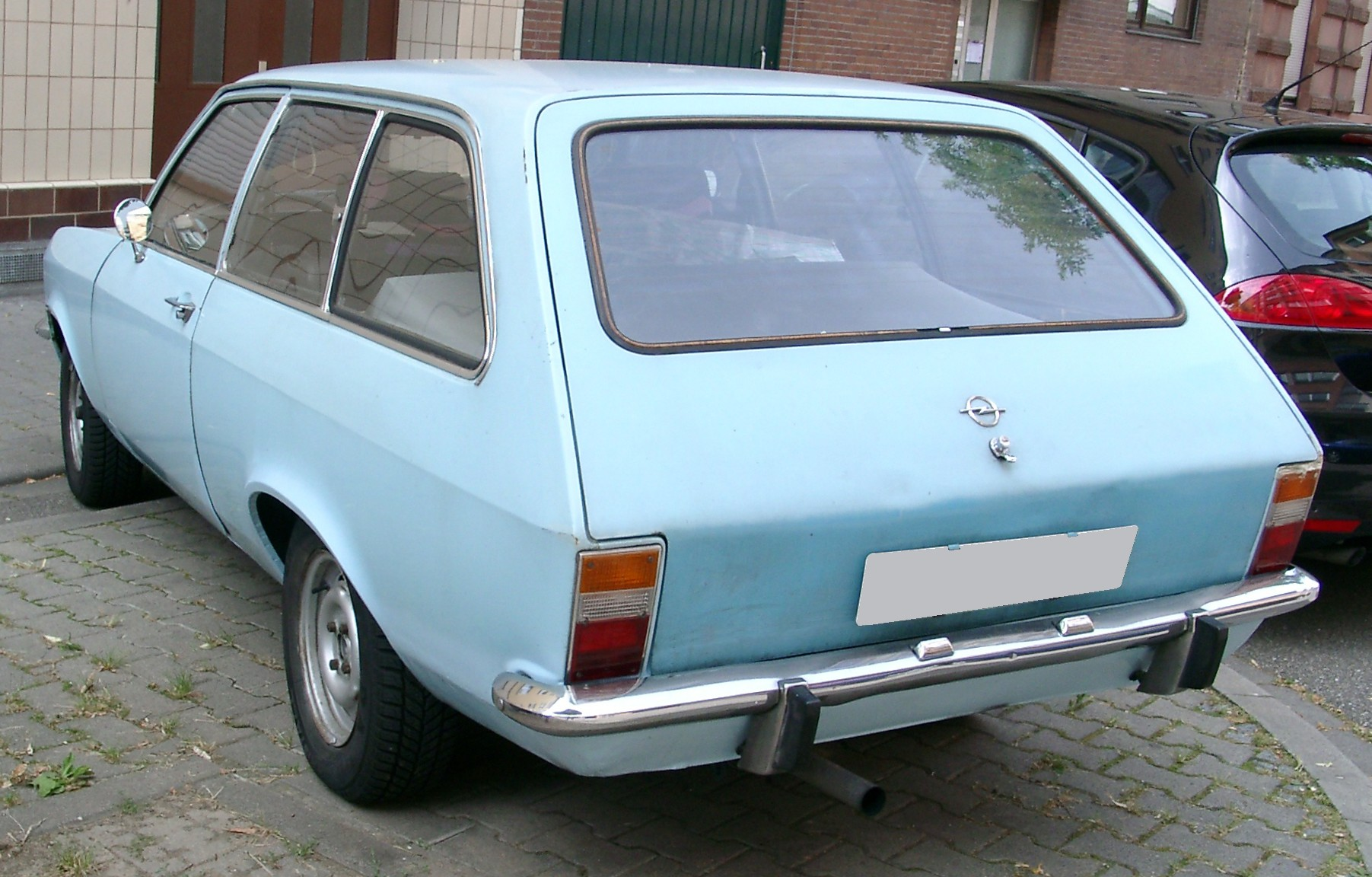
Opel Ascona Caravan (1973–1975)

Engines

- 1.2 S – 1,196 cc, 60 PS (44 kW)
- 1.6 N – 1,584 cc, 60–68 PS (44–50 kW)
- 1.6 S – 1,584 cc, 75–80 PS (55–59 kW)
- 1.9 S – 1,897 cc, 88–90 PS (65–66 kW)

=== Opel 1900 (US) ===
From 1971 to 1975, the 1.9-litre Ascona was exported to the United States as the "Opel 1900" and marketed at Buick-Opel dealerships. Originally two- and four-door saloons were offered, the former dropped after model year 1973. For 1974, rubber-clad impact bumpers were added in response to federal regulations. All Opels sold in the US in 1975 were equipped with Bosch L-Jetronic fuel injection, not available on the European versions, to comply with stricter US emissions requirements. The compression ratio was dropped to 7.6:1, enabling the car to run on 91-octane unleaded gasoline but also lowering maximum power to 75 hp (56 kW; 76 PS) at 4800 rpm.

Due to the unfavorable Deutsche Mark to US dollar exchange rate, all Opels in Buick showrooms were replaced by the Japanese-built Isuzu Geminis wearing Opel badges after 1975.

== Ascona B (1975–1981) ==
Ascona B
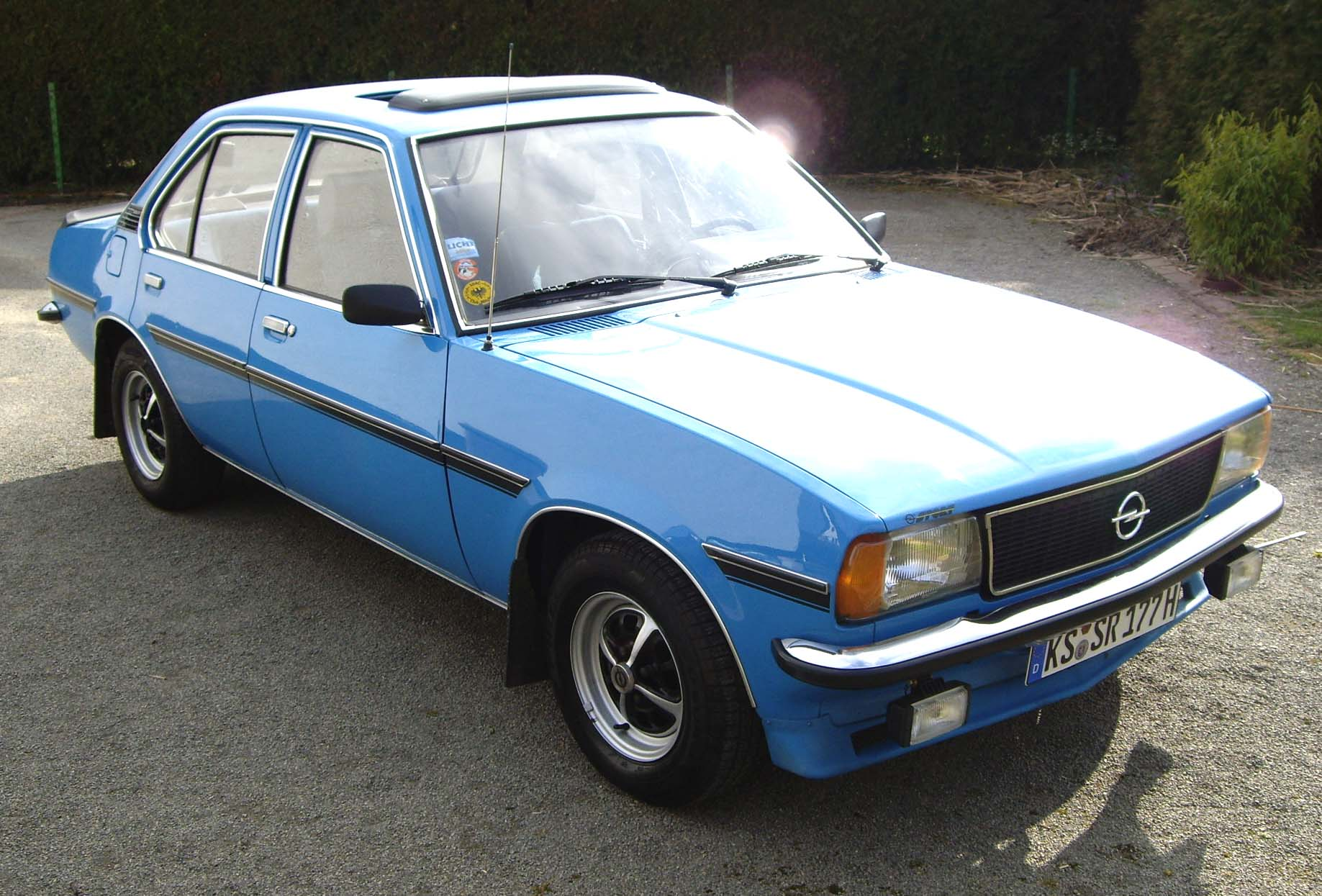

Overview
- Also called: Chevrolet Ascona (South Africa)
- Production: 1975–1981
- Assembly: Germany: Bochum; Belgium: Antwerp; South Africa: Port Elizabeth
- Designer: Tsutomu Aoto, Walter Bickelhaupt, George Gallion, Albertus Holsheimer

Body and chassis
- Body style: 2/4-door saloon
- Layout: FR layout
- Related: Vauxhall Cavalier; Chevrolet Chevair

Powertrain
- Engine: 1196 cc 12N/12S OHV I4; 1297 cc 13N/13S OHC I4; 1584 cc 16N/16S CIH I4; 1897 cc 19N/19S CIH I4; 1979 cc 20N/20S/20E CIH I4; 2420 cc 400/KAA DOHC 16V I4 (Ascona 400); 1998 cc 20D OHC diesel I4

Dimensions
- Wheelbase: 2,518 mm (99.1 in)
- Length: 4,321 mm (170.1 in)
- Width: 1,670 mm (66 in)
- Height: 1,380 mm (54 in)
- Curb weight: 1,050 kg (2,310 lb) (approx)

The second generation Opel Ascona B was presented in August 1975 at the Frankfurt Motor Show. It was available as a two or four-door saloon. There were related two and three-door coupé models in the Opel Manta range. There was no estate ("Caravan") body available. It was Opel's version of the "U-car" platform ("extended subcompact" — therefore unrelated to the later GM U-platform), and was essentially an enlarged version of the T-Car platform which underpinned the smaller Opel Kadett C and Vauxhall Chevette.

The Ascona B retained the same engine range as its predecessor, versions with higher compression ratio and needing 98 octane petrol, dubbed S, were available alongside the 90 octane models. The first change took place in January 1976, when laminated window glass became available as a no-cost option. The 1.9 L "S" cam-in-head engine was replaced by the modernised 2.0 L (20S) in September 1977. The 20N became available in January 1978, and all models now also received electric windscreen washers. A 2.0 L diesel motor was added to the Ascona B range in 1978, mostly targeted at the Benelux countries and Italy, where local tax structures provided an incentive for diesel-powered automobiles — in 1979, 97% of diesels were exported, while 59% of petrol powered cars went in the export.

By the end of 1978 the 1.6 S engine was discontinued in Germany (where it was replaced by the 19N, with the same power but lower fuel consumption), but continued to be available in some markets in a somewhat detuned version with 70 PS (51 kW). In January 1979 the street legal version of the Ascona 400 with 2.4-litre engine (16 valves, 144 PS) appeared, followed a month later by the more prosaic 1.3-litre OHC engine. This largely replaced the old 1.2-litre pushrod unit which dated back to 1962, but production continued in dwindling numbers into 1980 for some export markets.

In September 1979, the Ascona received a minor facelift, including plastic bumpers and a grey front grille with a larger mesh. The 2.0 E engine with a Bosch L-Jetronic electronic fuel injection arrived in January 1980, after having been first installed in the Manta and Rekord models. The 2.0 E equipped Ascona also received an upgraded clutch shared with the sporting Manta GT/E. In January 1981 the Ascona underwent its last changes, when adjustments made to the 16N and 20N engines. The 1.9 N and 2.0 N engines were discontinued in the German market, while the 1.6 N engine was now only available coupled with an automatic transmission.

Over 1.2 million Ascona B units were produced worldwide until August 1981. The two millionth Ascona was an Ascona B, built in April 1980, and the one millionth Ascona sold in Germany was registered in July of that same year. The related Manta coupé versions however, remained in production until 1988.

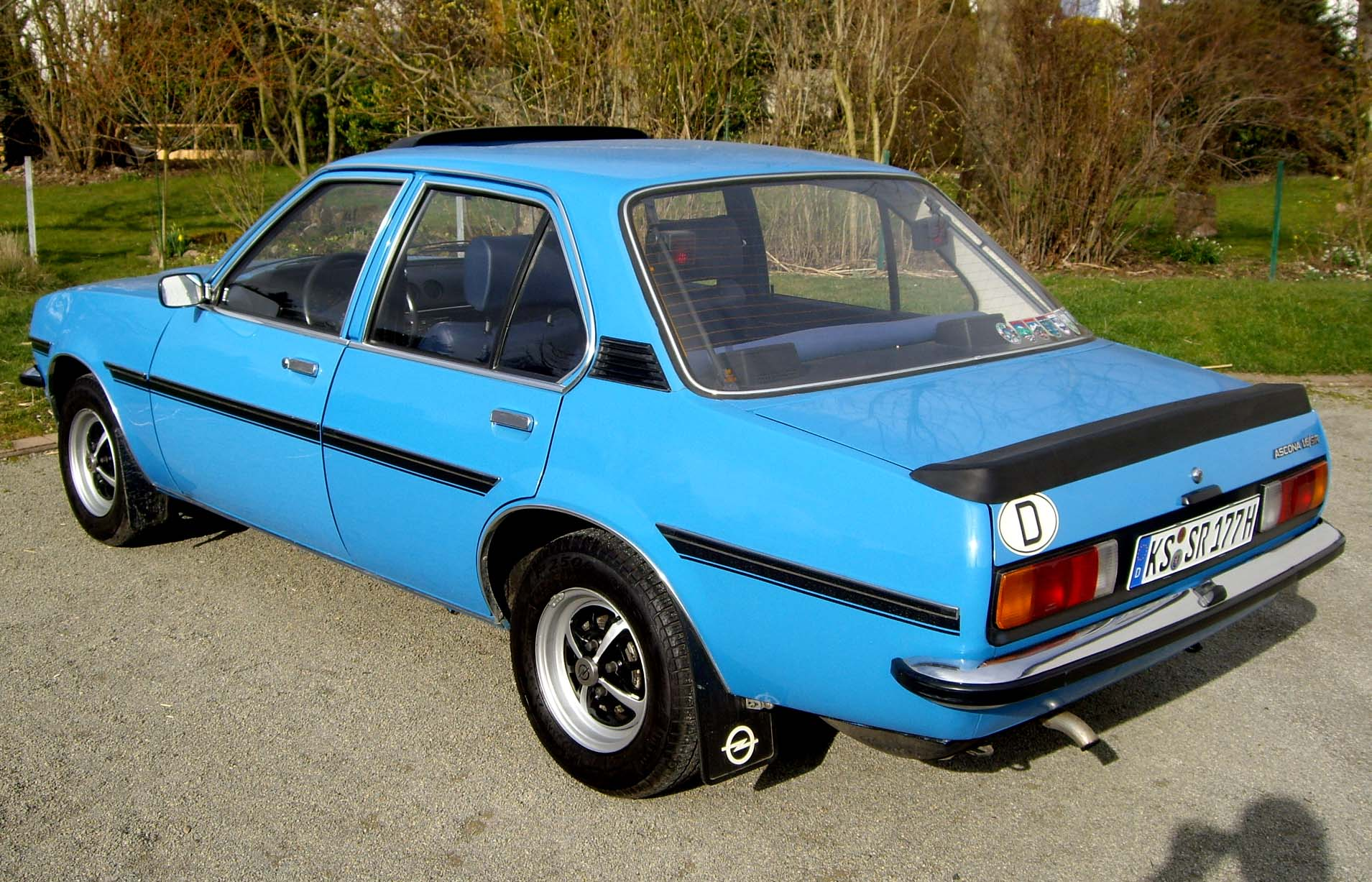
Rear view

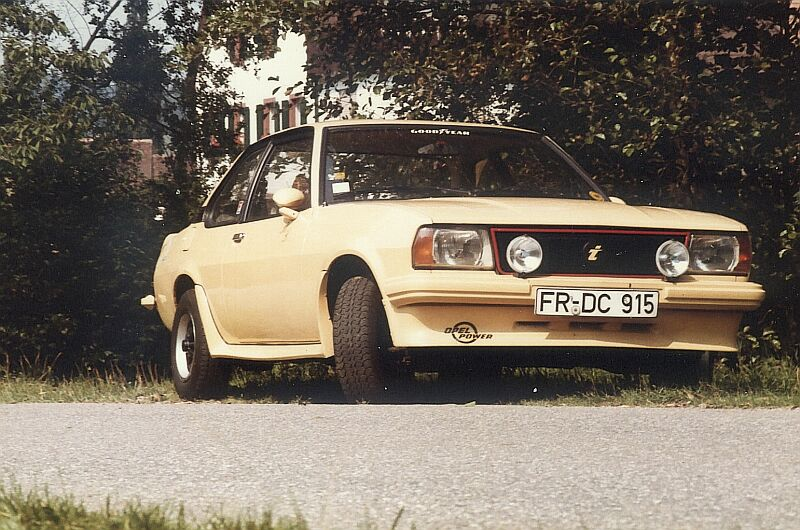
Ascona 2.0 with a factory tuned engine by Irmscher, 120 PS

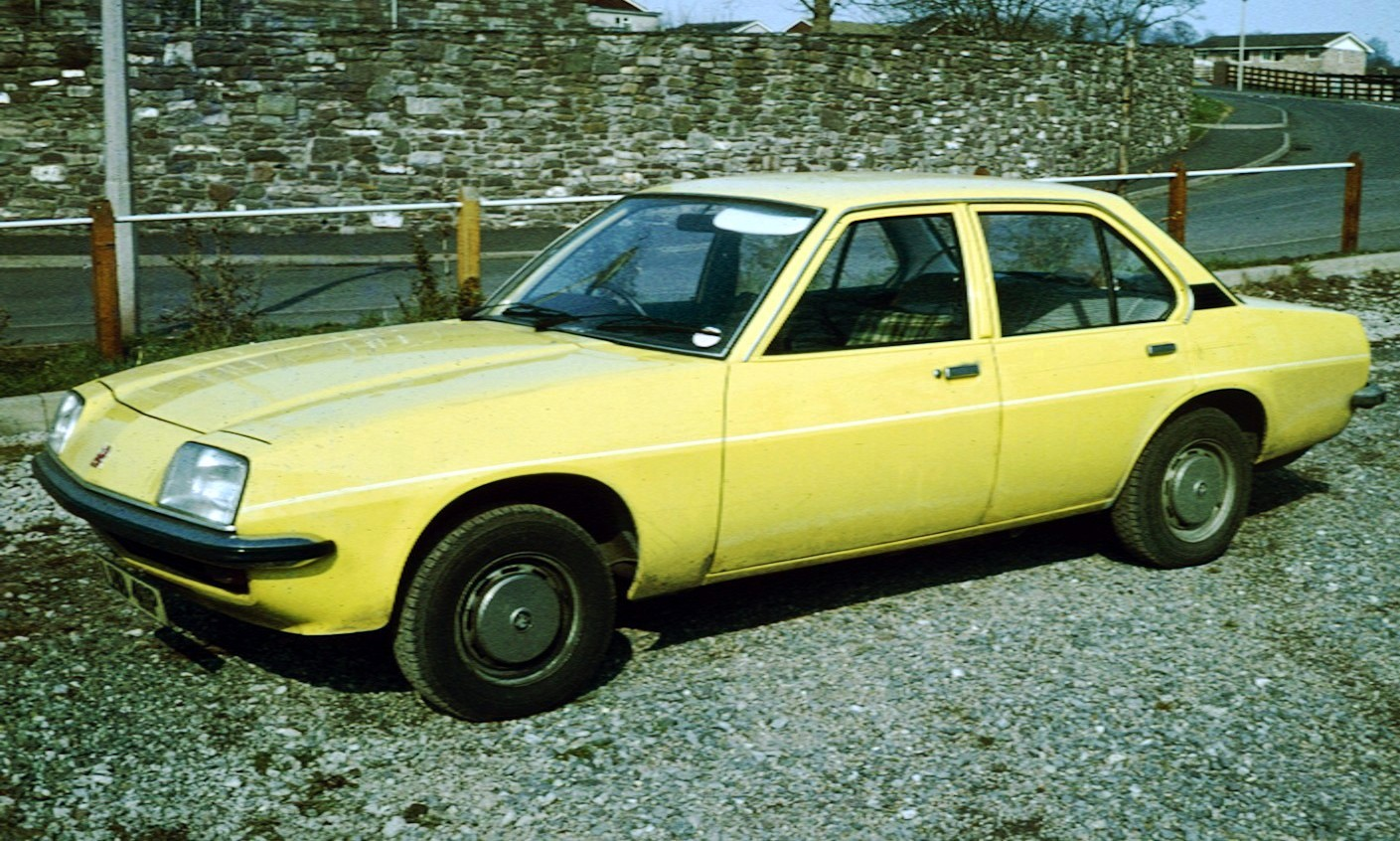
Vauxhall Cavalier MkI

Engines

- 1.2 N – 1196 cc, 55 PS (40 kW)
- 1.2 S – 1196 cc, 60 PS (44 kW) — 58 PS in Sweden and Switzerland (S12S)
- 1.3 N – 1297 cc, 60 PS (44 kW)
- 1.3 S – 1297 cc, 75 PS (55 kW)
- 1.6 N – 1584 cc, 60 PS (44 kW)
- 1.6 S – 1584 cc, 75 PS (55 kW), later 70 PS (51 kW)
- 1.9 N – 1897 cc, 75 PS (55 kW)
- 1.9 S – 1897 cc, 90 PS (66 kW)
- 2.0 N – 1979 cc, 90 PS (66 kW)
- 2.0 S – 1979 cc, 100 PS (74 kW)
- 2.0 E – 1979 cc, 110 PS (81 kW)
- 2.4 E – 2420 cc, 144 PS (106 kW)
- 2.0 D – 1998 cc, 58 PS (43 kW)

=== Export models ===
In the United Kingdom, the Vauxhall Cavalier badge was used on both saloon and coupé models from late 1975, which came out of the same factory in Belgium — the first Vauxhall to be built abroad. The front ends were different, featuring Vauxhall's trademark "droop snoot", as designed by Wayne Cherry.

South Africa

In South Africa there was a locally assembled version called the Chevrolet Ascona, identical in many respects to the four-door Opel Ascona B. The Ascona came with a locally built 1.3-litre inline-four from the Vauxhall Viva. A preceding upmarket version with the Vauxhall Cavalier's longer front end was sold as the Chevrolet Chevair, equipped with bigger engines of Chevrolet origins. The Ascona was launched in July 1978, and replaced the Vauxhall-based Chevrolet 1300/1900-series. It was available in De Luxe or S trim, with the S receiving a sportier treatment with a three-spoke steering wheel, tartan seat inserts, and Rostyle rims.

=== Ascona 400 rally car ===
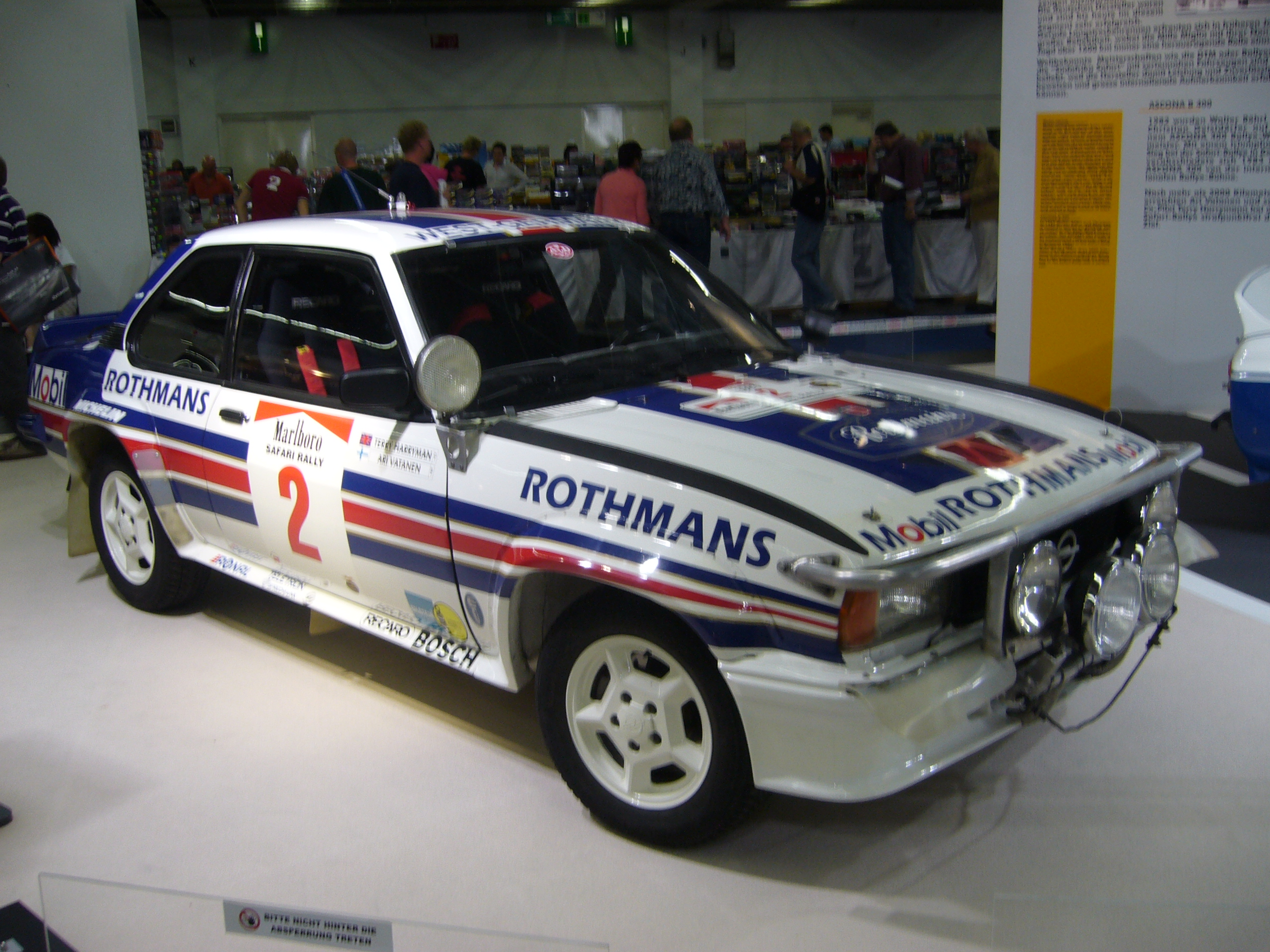
The Rothmans Ascona 400 which won the 1983 Safari Rally in the hands of Ari Vatanen.

First shown at Frankfurt in September 1979, the Ascona 400 was a homologation special sold only to make it eligible for rallying's Group 4 category. The Ascona 400s were built at General Motors' plant in Antwerp. The 1980 world champion Walter Röhrl took the rally car to victory and won the World Rally Championship drivers' title in the 1982 season.

The car was developed by Opel alongside the Manta B 400 model which consisted of the same changes. Irmscher and Cosworth were hired as partners for the project, Cosworth to deliver a 16 valve double cam crossflow head for the engine, and Irmscher for the exterior and interior styling. Cosworth delivered the heads to Opel and Opel soon discovered a major mistake. The plan was to use the 2.0-litre engine block but this did not produce enough power. Time was running out and Opel badly needed to do something. Opel took the 2.0E block, installed forged pistons, different connecting-rods, and forged crankshaft with 85mm stroke. The result was a 2.4-litre engine. The 2.4-litre engine gave rise to some massive power outputs using the 16 valve head. The street versions of the 400 therefore came with 144 PS (106 kW) engines, using the Bosch fuel injection of the Manta GSi and GT/E series. However, in race trim they were delivered putting out 230 PS (169 kW), which could be improved further to 340 PS (250 kW), while still using normally aspirated engine components.

Irmscher delivered the rally trim for the exterior. Large and widened wings, light weight hood, front wings, rear boot lid and doors were also installed.

By 1984, the Audi Quattro gained increased power and the Ascona 400 was rendered obsolete. However, the Ascona 400 retains several notable records. It was the last rear-wheel-drive rally car to win the Drivers' World Championship, ensuring its place in motorsports history.

==== WRC victories ====
No.	Event	Season	Driver	Co-driver	Car
1	(Sweden) 30th International Swedish Rally	1980	(Sweden) Anders Kulläng	(Sweden) Bruno Berglund	Opel Ascona 400
2	(Monaco) 50éme Rallye Automobile de Monte Carlo	1982	(Germany) Walter Röhrl	(Germany) Christian Geistdörfer	Opel Ascona 400
3	(Ivory Coast) 14ème Rallye Côte d'Ivoire	1982	(Germany) Walter Röhrl	(Germany) Christian Geistdörfer	Opel Ascona 400
4	(Kenya) 31st Marlboro Safari Rally	1983	(Finland) Ari Vatanen	(United Kingdom) Terry Harryman	Opel Ascona 400

== Ascona C (1981–1988) ==
Ascona C
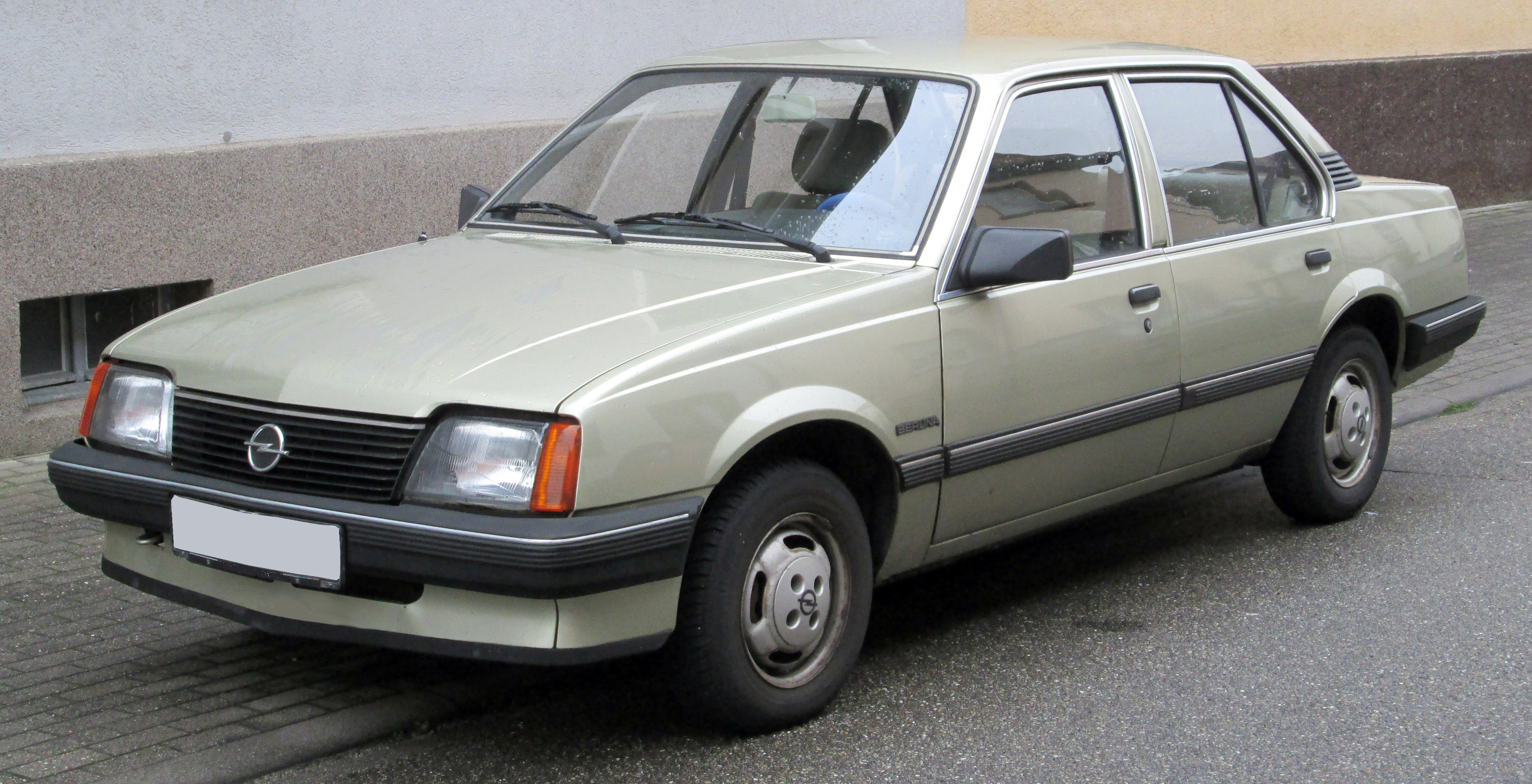

Overview
- Also called: Chevrolet Monza (South America); Vauxhall Cavalier Mk II
- Production: 1981–1988; 1982–1996 (Brazil)
- Assembly: Belgium: Antwerp; Germany: Rüsselsheim; Yugoslavia: Kikinda (IDA-Opel); United Kingdom: Luton; Brazil: São Caetano do Sul; Venezuela: Valencia, Carabobo; Colombia: Bogotá; South Africa: Port Elizabeth (General Motors South Africa)

Body and chassis
- Body style: 2/4-door saloon; 5-door fastback/hatchback; 3-door hatchback (Brazil)
- Layout: FF layout
- Platform: GM J platform
- Related: Buick Skyhawk; Cadillac Cimarron; Chevrolet Cavalier; Isuzu Aska; Oldsmobile Firenza; Holden Camira; Pontiac J2000; Vauxhall Cavalier; Daewoo Espero

Powertrain
- Transmission: 4/5-speed manual 3-speed automatic

Dimensions
- Wheelbase: 2,574 mm (101.3 in)
- Length: 4,366 mm (171.9 in) (saloon); 4,264 mm (167.9 in) (hatchback)
- Width: 1,668 mm (65.7 in)
- Height: 1,395 mm (54.9 in) (saloon); 1,385 mm (54.5 in) (hatchback)
- Curb weight: 920–1,090 kg (2,028–2,403 lb)

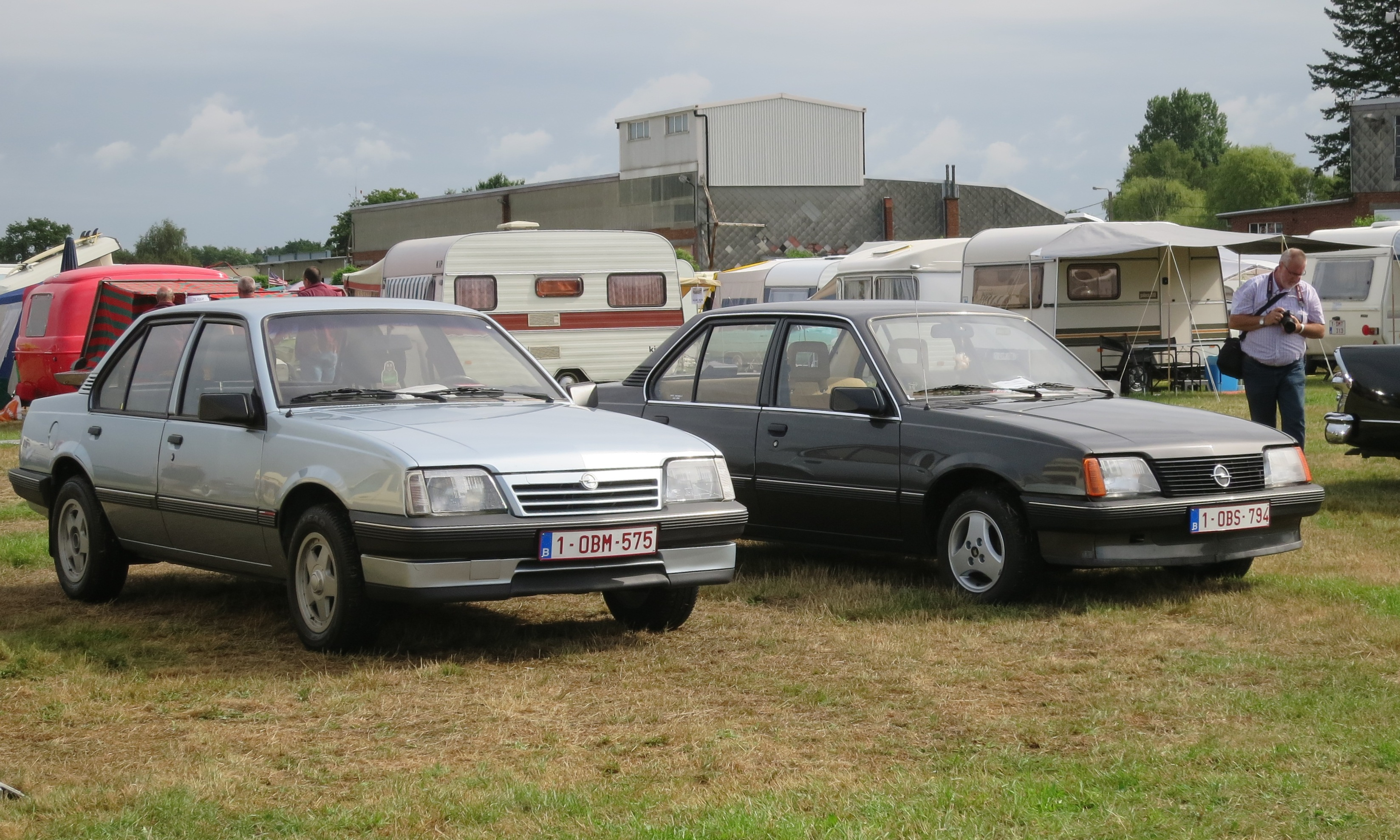
The Ascona C3, introduced for 1986, featured a body-coloured grille, in contrast with the black "CD" grille used across the Ascona range since 1984 (on the C2).

The Ascona C was launched in August 1981 as part of General Motors' J-car project. This was Opel's second front-wheel drive car since the introduction of the Kadett D in 1979. This car was manufactured in Rüsselsheim, Germany, Antwerp, Belgium, São Caetano do Sul, Brazil and Luton, England, and was sold in the UK under the name Vauxhall Cavalier and as the Chevrolet Monza in Latin America. The Cavalier Coupé was phased out, but the Opel Manta was retained in the UK (the last car to be badged as an Opel in the UK before the brand was phased out there in 1988). There were no longer sheet metal differences between Opel and Vauxhall models after 1982. The Ascona C won the "Goldenes Lenkrad" (Golden Steering Wheel) award at the end of 1981 and was West Germany's biggest selling car. The new Ascona no longer had the sporty character of its predecessors, being a more unadulterated family car which was considerably more space-efficient than earlier models.

It was narrowly beaten to the European Car of the Year award by the Renault 9 in 1982. It took another 27 years before its successor model, the Opel Insignia, won the 2009 European Car of the Year award by only 1 point, from the Second placed Ford Fiesta. The Ascona C underwent two notable facelifts during its term of production.

The range added an option of a five-door fastback/hatchback Bodystyle, named CC in a few markets — short for "Combi Coupé." The hatchback model was shorter than the saloons, with a marginally smaller luggage compartment and 5 cm (2.0 in) less headspace in the backseat. All engines were now SOHC crossflow designs with a breakerless ignition system and hydraulic tappets. The base model was the 1.3 L introduced in 1978 in the Ascona B, with 60 PS (44 kW), followed by a 1.6 L with 75 PS (55 kW). "S" versions with higher compression ratio had power increased by as much as twenty per cent. The top of the line was the sporty GTE model, with electronic fuel injection, pushing power to 130 PS (96 kW) in the last two model years. Diesel power came from an 1.6SH derived block, with 1.6-litres. Catalytic converters were optional in the larger petrol units starting from 1986.

The Ascona C was also assembled in South Africa, where it was sold by GM South Africa, replacing the Chevrolet Ascona which was based on the Ascona B. It was dropped in 1986 and replaced by a saloon version of the Kadett E called the Opel Monza.

As before, there was no estate car version of the Ascona, although Vauxhall in the UK brought in the rear ends of the Holden Camira wagon (estate car) and adapted them to the Cavalier beginning with the 1984 model year. Opel continued to use the Ascona nameplate until the Vectra was launched in 1988, while the Cavalier name was retained by Vauxhall until 1995.

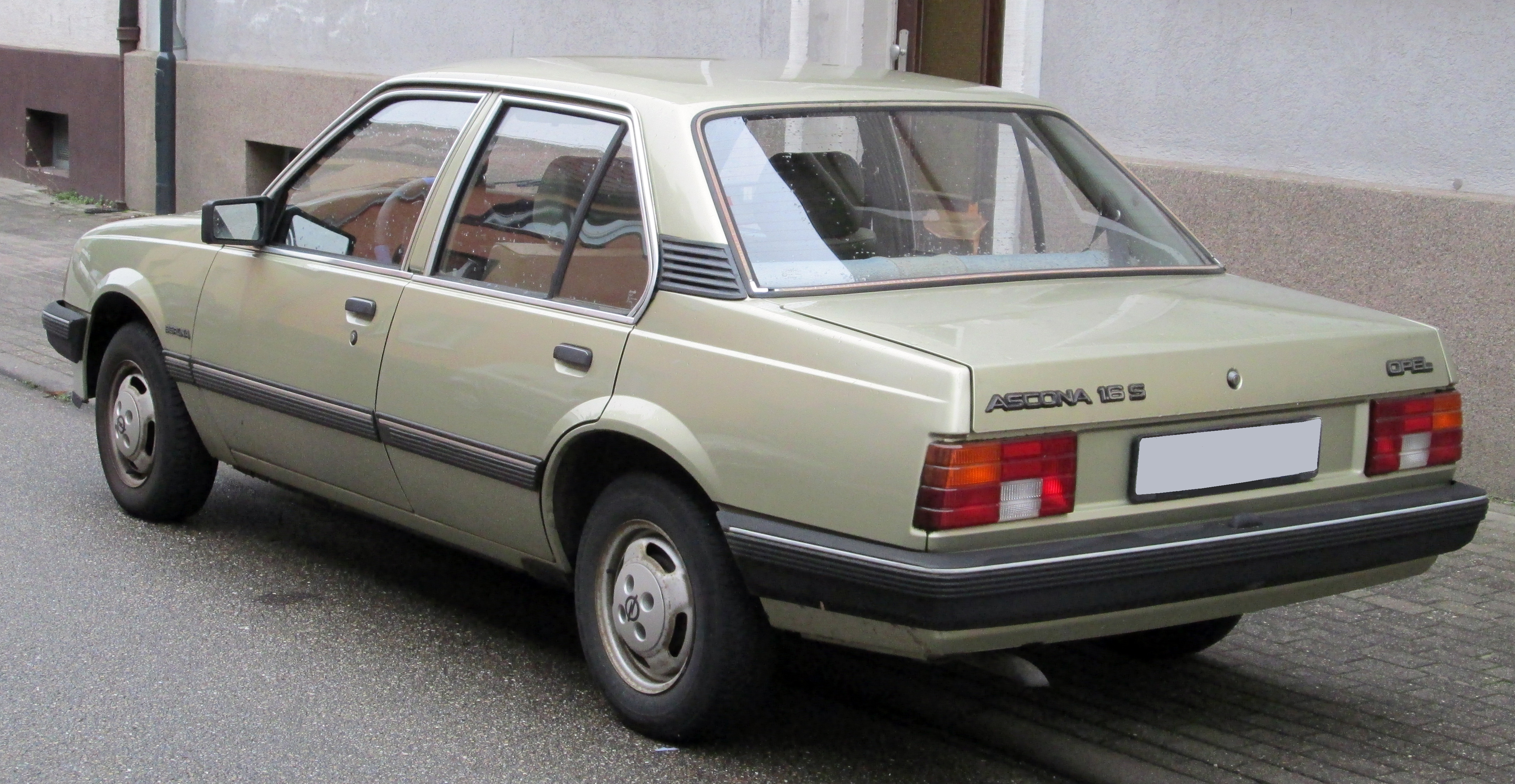
Rear view, 1981–84 model

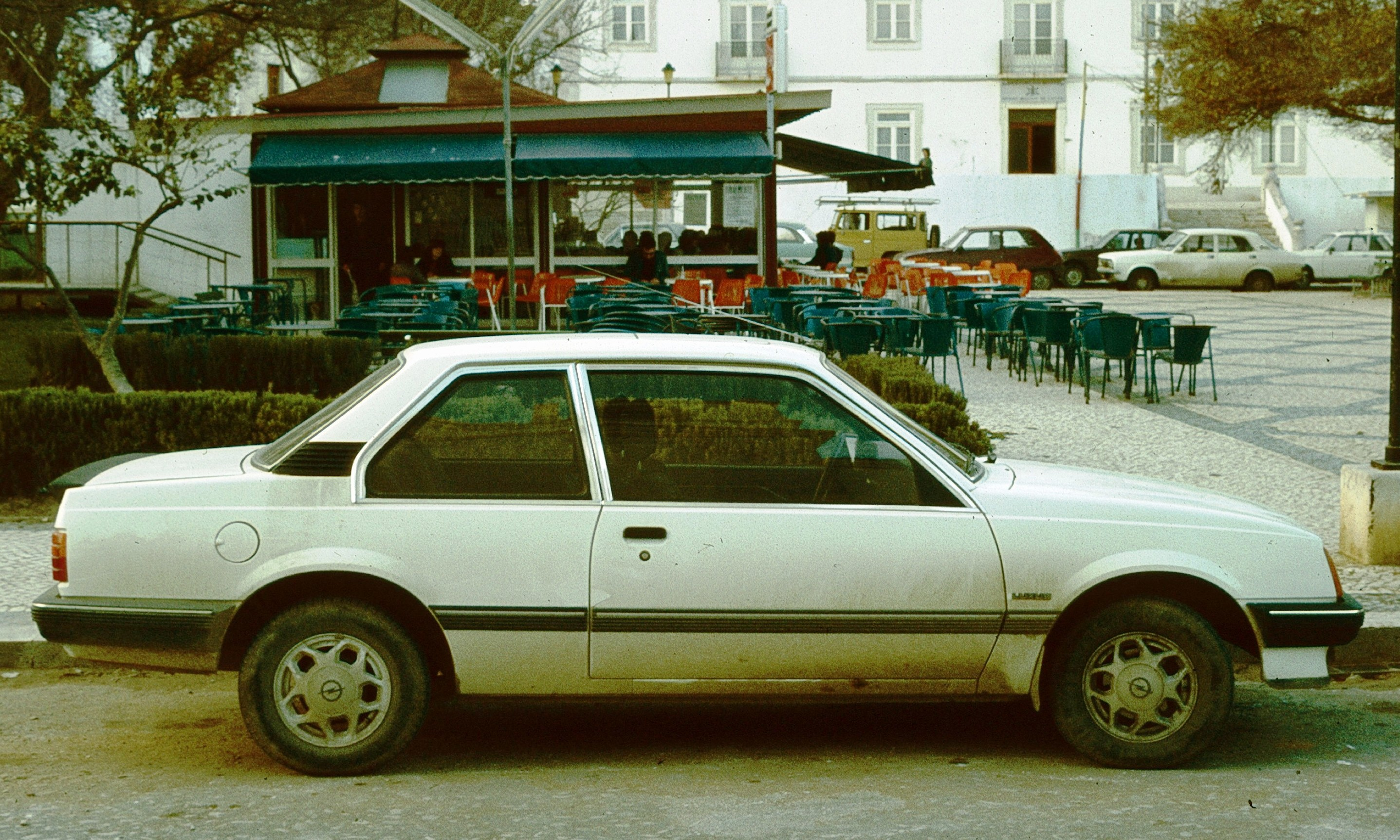
2-door saloon (1981–1984)

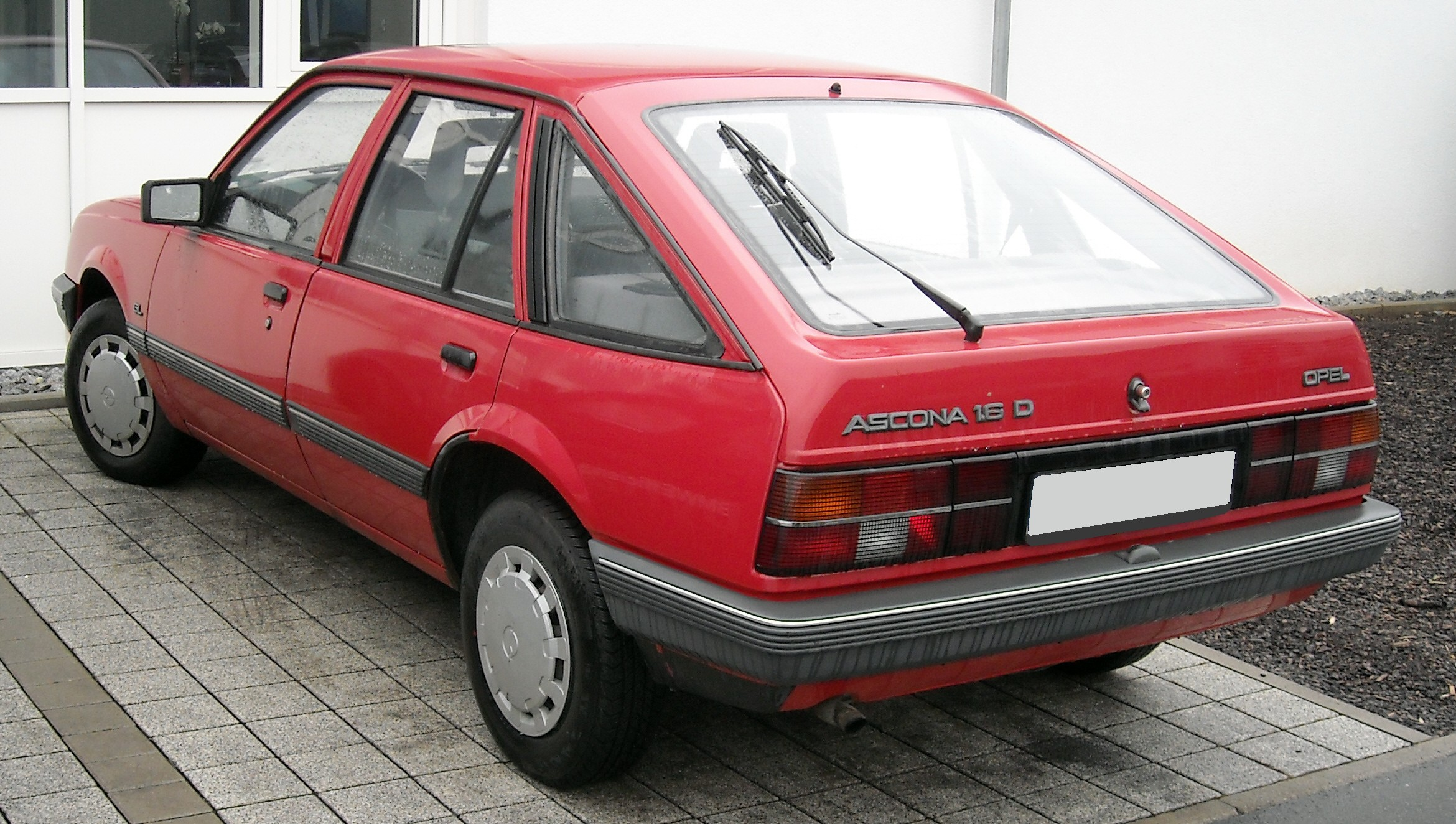
Five-door (C3, 1986-1988)

Timeline

- September 1981 — Introduction of the Ascona C as the successor for the Ascona B. This, the original version, is usually referred to as "C1" to distinguish it from the later, facelifted versions. Available bodystyles for the Ascona included 2- and 4-door saloons and a 5-door hatchback (the CC). Initial engine choice included the 1.3N (60 PS), 1.3S (75 PS), 1.6N (75 PS) and 1.6S (90 PS), all of which had a four-speed gearbox or optional three-speed automatic transmission for all except the 1.3 N. Trim variations included Base, Luxus, Berlina, and SR.
- 1982 — Introduction of the Ascona Diesel with a 1.6 (55 PS) engine, available with a five-speed gearbox. Introduction of the Ascona CD with higher level of equipment. A new 1.8E engine with LE-Jetronic (115 PS) and five-speed gearbox is introduced in September. Optional power steering, electric windows, electric mirrors and computer available at extra cost. The five-speed transmission was now also made available in the 1.6S. Introduction of Chevrolet Monza in Brazil, with a 1.6 engine and 3 door hatchback body style. Later the 1.8 engine was made available.
- 1983 — Modified ignition switch and door locks. Improvements made to water pump, valve seals and radiator hoses. Aftermarket convertibles were now available from Keinath (later also by Hammond & Thiede). Optional central locking and heated mirrors. Optional Sports suspension available for SR and 1.8 E engine. Automatically adjustable rear brakes now standard. As of May, the five-speed transmission was available in all models. Introduction of 2 and 4 door saloon bodystyle in Brazil.
- 1984 — C2: All models have a facelift with new CD-style radiator grille, new wheel trims, new front seat mountings, modified centre console, remote-adjustable door mirrors and height-adjustable steering wheel. 1.3S engine now has a new start-stop system. Improved clutch damping and headlight seals. Model names also changed: Base becomes LS, L becomes GL, Berlina becomes GLS, and SR becomes GT.
- 1985 — 1.8i engine with three-way catalyst introduced (100 PS). This engine was built in Rüsselsheim and only installed in cars built in that plant, meaning that it was not available in the two-door bodywork as that style was only manufactured in Antwerp. One-way catalysts are available for all engines. Modified clutch lining and door seals.
- 1986 – C3: All models are facelifted, this time with clear front indicator lenses, dark taillight lenses with fewer ridges, colour-keyed radiator grille, air vent, and front spoiler. GT now has front and rear spoilers. New engines were also available: 1.6i and 2.0i with three-way catalysts. The 1.6i has Multec-central Injection system and 75 PS (55 kW), while the 2.0i has Bosch Motronic Injection system and 115 PS (85 kW), with or without catalyst (20NE/C20NE). The 1.3 was no longer available in the German market.
- 1987 — Non-catalyst 2.0i replaced by 130 PS (96 kW) 20SEH version, only available with GT trim. Introduction of 2.0 engine in Brazil.
- 1988 — The GL model changes name to "Touring" (already used in 1986 for the last of the C2 Ascona's). August marks the end of production for the Ascona C, replaced by the Opel Vectra A.
- 1990 — 2 and 4 door saloon models are facelifted in Brazil.
- 1991 — Electronic fuel injection is adopted in Brazil.
- 1996 — End of production in Brazil.

Models

The following versions of the Ascona C were available, all with inline fours. Data is for the German market. There were certain differences in various export market models:

Engine		Cat.	Power				Torque			Transmission	Top speed		Fuel type	Equipment levels		Years
Engine		Cat.	PS	kW	hp	at rpm	N·m	lb·ft	at rpm	Transmission	km/h	mph	Fuel type	before facelift	after facelift	Years
1.3N	1297 cc	–	60	44	59	5800	94	69	3400–3800	4MT	150	93	normal	Std/J/Luxus/Berlina	LS/GL/GLS	81–86
1.3S	1297 cc	–	75	55	74	5800	101	74	3800–4600	4MT, 3AT	160	99	super	Std/J/Luxus/Berlina	LS/GL/GLS	81–86
1.6N	1598 cc	–	75	55	74	5600	123	91	3000–4000	4/5MT, 3AT	160	99	normal	Std/J/Luxus/Berlina	LS/GL/Touring/GLS	81–88
1.6E	1598 cc	●	75	55	74	5200	121	89	3400	4/5MT, 3AT	160	99	unleaded	—	LS/GL/Touring/GLS	86–88
1.6S	1598 cc	–	90	66	89	5800	126	93	3800–4200	4/5MT, 3AT	170	106	super	Std/J/Luxus/Berl./SR	LS/GL/GLS/GT/CD	81–86
↓	↓	–	82	60	81	5400	130	96	2600	↓	165	103	↓	—	LS/GL/GLS	86–87
1.8N	1796 cc	–	84	62	83	5400	143	105	2600	4/5MT, 3AT	168	104	normal	—	LS/GL/Touring/GLS/GT	87–88
1.8E	1796 cc	–	115	85	113	5800	151	111	4800	5MT, 3AT	187	116	super	Luxus/Berl./SRE/CD	GL/Touring/GLS/GT/CD	82–86
↓	↓	●	100	74	99	5800	140	103	3000	↓	180	112	↓	—	LS/GL/GLS/GT/CD	85–86
2.0E	1998 cc	–	115	85	113	5800	175	129	3000	5MT, 3AT	187	116	super	—	GL/Touring/GLS/GT	86–87
↓	↓	●	↓	↓	↓	5400	170	125	↓	↓	↓	↓	sup. unld.	—	LS/GL/Touring/GLS/GT	86–88
↓	↓	–	130	96	128	5600	180	133	4600	5MT	193	120	↓	—	GT	87–88
1.6D	1598 cc	–	54	40	53	4600	96	71	2400	4/5MT, 3AT	143	89	diesel	Std/J/Luxus/Berl./CD	LS/GL/Touring/GLS/CD	82–88

=== Chevrolet Monza ===
In Brazil, the Ascona C was sold from May 1982 until August 1996 as the Chevrolet Monza. Chevrolet did not use the Ascona model name because the Spanish and Portuguese word "asco" means "disgust, repugnance". Instead, it was named after the famous Italian circuit.

It was originally only available as a three-door hatchback, a body style unique to Latin America. However, two and four-door saloons appeared in March 1983. GM do Brasil also considered offering the Monza as an estate car, and produced two full-size clay models, one with five doors and one with three doors, with a similar rear to the Holden Camira in Australia, which was also used as the basis of the Vauxhall Cavalier in the UK and Northern Ireland, but it never entered into production. However, Envemo began converting the four-door Monza saloon into an estate called the Camping, although it retained the rear doors and taillights of the saloon. Envemo also converted the two-door Monza saloon into a convertible. In 1989 the slow-selling liftback was discontinued, leaving only the two- and four-door three-box saloons.

Originally it was available with either a 1.6- or 1.8-litre engine with 75 or 84 PS (55 or 62 kW). These were changed to more powerful 1.8 and 2.0s in 1986.

The Monza received a number of facelifts, the last one bringing its looks in line with those of current European GM products, with new fenders front and rear to accommodate new head and taillights. Diesel versions were available for export markets, most notably Uruguay and Argentina, powered by Isuzu's 4EC1 engine.

The Monza first went on sale in Colombia in 1985 in a 4-door saloon body style, assembled locally by GM Colmotores. In Colombia, a top of the line saloon version was sold from 1987 to 1992 as the Monza Classic with a three-speed automatic transmission. In Venezuela it was assembled and sold from 1985 to 1990. Originally it was equipped with a carbureted 1.8-litre engine, but this was later replaced with a fuel-injected 2-litre unit.

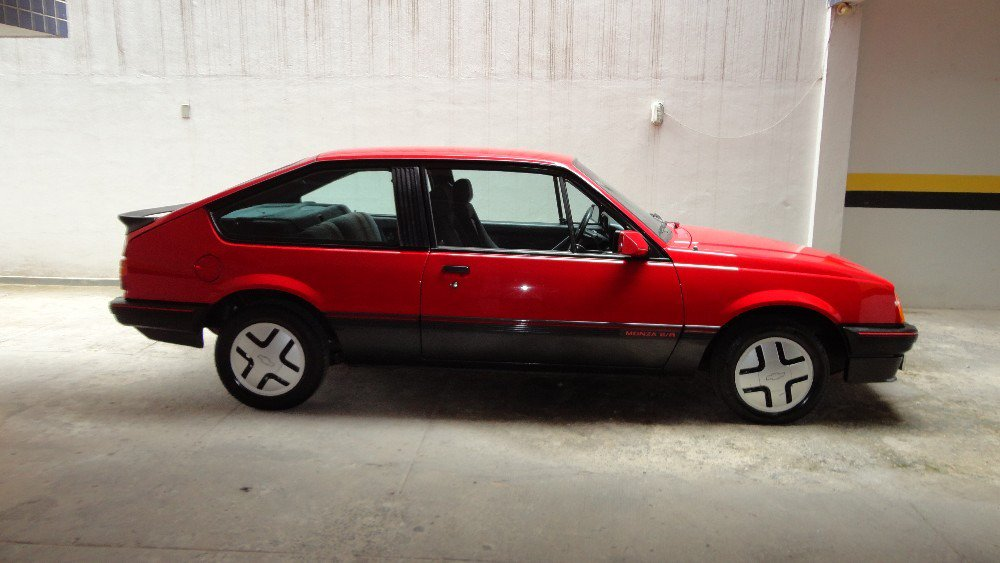
Brazilian-made Monza 1.8 S/R Hatchback three-door

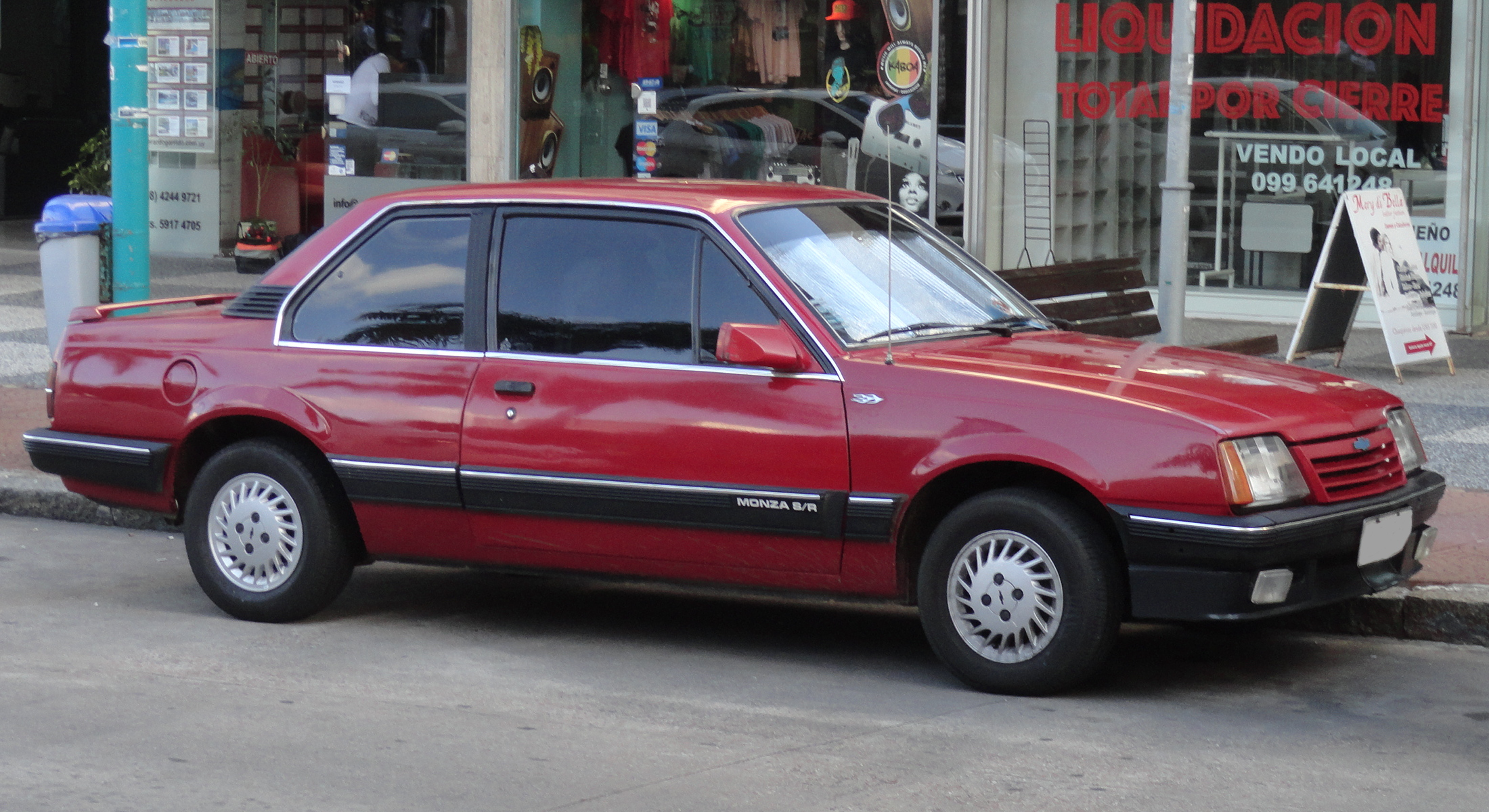
Chevrolet Monza 1.8 S/R two-door saloon

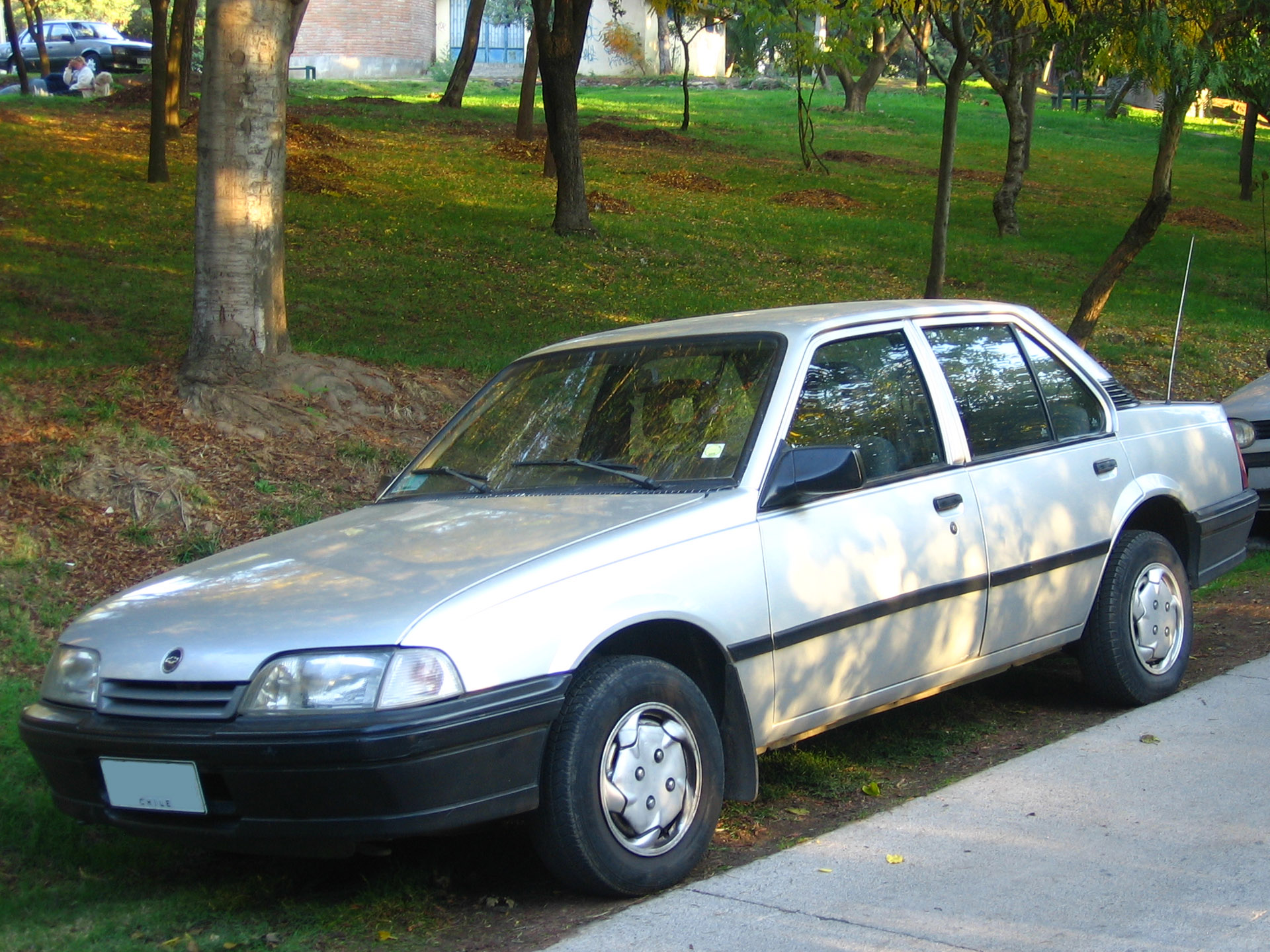
1996 Chevrolet Monza GL (facelift model)
