= Walter Röhrl =

German rally driver (born 1947)

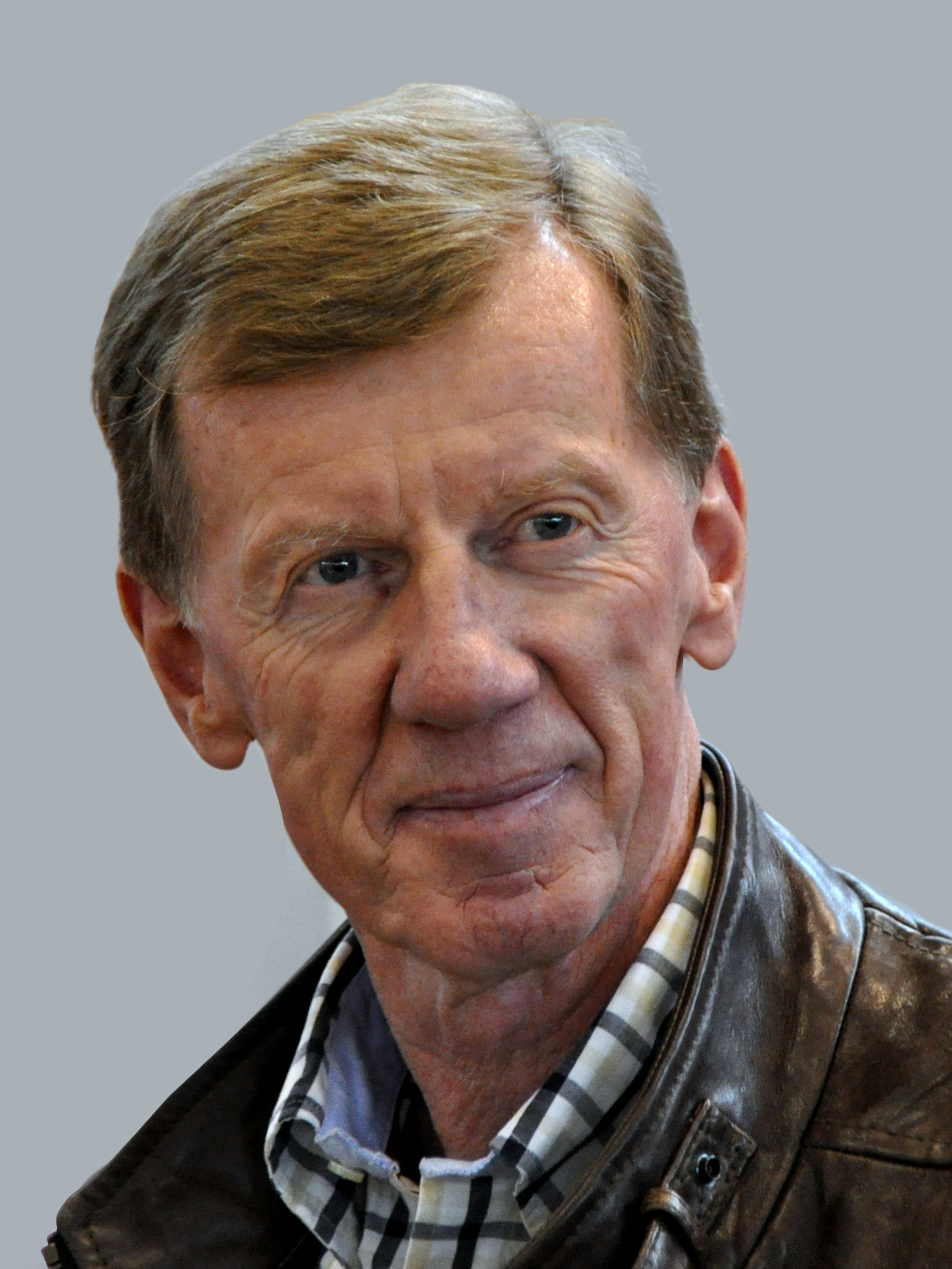
- Röhrl at Retro Classics Stuttgart, Germany in 2012

Personal information
- Nationality: (Germany) German
- Born: 7 March 1947 (age 79); Regensburg, Germany

World Rally Championship record
- Years active: 1973–1987
- Co-driver: (Germany) Jochen Berger (Sweden) Claes Billstam (Germany) Willi-Peter Pitz (Germany) Christian Geistdörfer (United Kingdom) Phil Short
- Teams: Porsche, Fiat, Opel, Lancia, Audi
- Rallies: 75
- Championships: 2 (1980, 1982)
- Rally wins: 14
- Podiums: 31
- Stage wins: 420
- Total points: 494
- First rally: 1973 Monte Carlo Rally
- First win: 1975 Acropolis Rally
- Last win: 1985 San Remo Rally
- Last rally: 1987 Acropolis Rally

Walter Röhrl (German pronunciation: [ˈvaltɐ ˈʁøːɐ̯l]; born 7 March 1947) is a German rally and auto racing driver, with victories for Fiat, Opel, Lancia and Audi as well as Porsche, Ford and BMW. Röhrl had 14 victories over his career, with his notable achievements including winning the World Rally Championship twice: in 1980 with a Fiat 131 Abarth and in 1982 while driving for Opel with the Ascona 400. He has also competed in other forms of motorsport, such as endurance racing, winning the GTP +3.0 class at the 24 Hours of Le Mans in 1981 with the Porsche System team. Röhrl also set the Pikes Peak International Hill Climb record in 1987, driving an Audi Sport Quattro S1 E2. He is often regarded as one of the greatest rally drivers of all time.

== Career ==
Röhrl grew up as the youngest of the three children of a stonemason in Regensburg, Bavaria, near Munich. His parents separated when he was ten years old. From then on he lived with his mother. After leaving school, he completed a commercial education at Bishop's Ordinariate Regensburg. At the age of 16, Röhrl began working for the commercial director of a company that legally represented the Bishop of Regensburg along with six further Bishops in Bavaria, and skied in his spare time. In time, he became a qualified ski instructor and a keen driver, and became the chauffeur to the commercial director, covering up to 120,000 kilometres annually.

=== Rally career ===
Röhrl was invited to drive his first rally in 1968.

Röhrl was a World Rally Championship favourite throughout the 1970s and 1980s, winning the Monte Carlo Rally four times with four different marques. His co-driver for many years was Christian Geistdörfer. His Fiat 131 Abarth carried him to the 1980 title, clinched with his victory in that year's San Remo rally. For 1981, Röhrl signed a five-year deal with Mercedes-Benz, who planned to compete with a 500 SL roadster in 1981 and 1982, to be followed by a purpose-built, mid-engined, turbocharged Group B car in 1983. In the end, Mercedes-Benz withdrew shortly before the first rally of the season and cancelled the Group B program. Röhrl was given a DM 900,000 lump sum and release from his five-year contract, but too late in the season to get a seat.

A few months later, Röhrl and Geistdörfer took a short-term engagement with Porsche and campaigned a Porsche 924 Carrera GTS in six rounds of the German rally championship. Röhrl also started the San Remo rally in a Porsche 911 SC, but was forced to retire with driveshaft trouble while in second place. Röhrl has referred to this as his most bitter retirement, as he had been hoping that a victory would help coax Porsche into committing to a full WRC effort.

It was arguably his second title, in the 1982 World Rally Championship season, that impressed most of all, with Röhrl fending off four-wheel drive opposition led by Audi's resurgent Michèle Mouton, to take the title by virtue of consistency in his increasingly outmoded rear-drive Opel Ascona 400. It was also during this time that he won the African Rally Championship in 1982. However, shortly after winning the championship, he was fired from the team by team manager Tony Fall because he disliked competing in the RAC rally (the rally he had little success in). Röhrl had already had severe arguments with Fall about publicity activities for the team sponsor, tobacco company Rothmans. Röhrl, as a strict nonsmoker, refused to do any filming for Rothmans publicity spots, claiming that he had been hired as a driver, not an actor, and that he could not see any sense in promoting tobacco as a non-smoker.

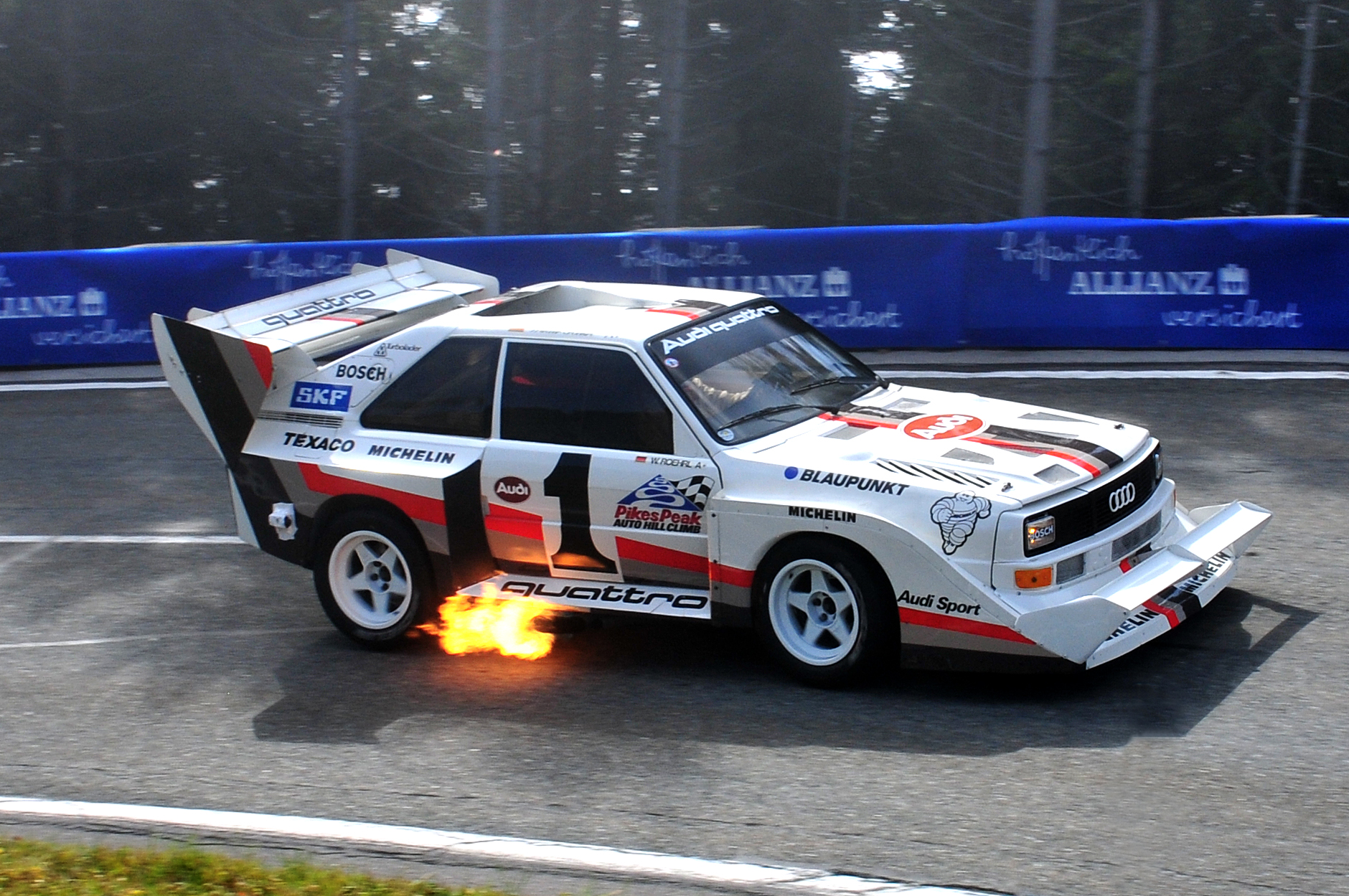
Audi S1 Pikes Peak

In 1983, he joined Lancia to pilot the new, rear-wheel drive Lancia 037, before finally changing his machinery in 1984 to the four-wheel drive Audi Quattro, a car produced in his home state of Bavaria.

In 1987, Röhrl set up a new record in the Pikes Peak International Hill Climb by being the first driver to win the 12.42 miles (19.99 km) long mountain track to the Pikes Peak in less than 11 minutes. In his 600 hp (440 kW) Audi Sport Quattro S1 E2 he did the American hillclimb in 10 minutes and 47.850 seconds to reach Pikes Peak on the road which at that time was mainly covered with gravel.

Despite being selective in his choice of top-level events (he declined to do the 1000 Lakes Rally in Finland due to his dislike of jumps and cars getting airborne, he did the RAC Rally in Britain only once more after 1979 and he only did the Swedish Rally twice, despite finishing third in 1982), albeit during a time when this was not unusual for top-line drivers in the championship, Röhrl still scored 14 WRC victories in his career.

In Italy, Röhrl was elected "Rallye driver of the century". In France, he was elected "Rallye driver of the millennium" in November 2000. A jury out of 100 worldwide motorsports experts meeting in Italy elected him "Best Rallye driver ever". In 2011, Röhrl was inducted into the Rally Hall of Fame along with Hannu Mikkola and, in July 2016, was inducted into Germany's Sports Hall of Fame.

=== Other events ===
Röhrl was also successful in road racing events and was called "Genius on Wheels" by Niki Lauda. Together with Jürgen Barth, he took a class victory in the 1981 Le Mans 24 Hours at the wheel of a Porsche 924 Carrera GTP (actually a 944 prototype), finishing seventh overall. Together with Harald Grohs and Dieter Schornstein, he started in two races in the World Sportscar Championship the same year on a Porsche 935, winning the Silverstone 6 Hours race. In the 1992 24 Hours Nürburgring race, which saw fog and heavy rain in the night, he hardly slowed down, anticipating the corners by timing. The race was nevertheless interrupted for hours.

In recent years, Röhrl has been retained as the senior test driver for Porsche road cars, setting quick laptimes for them testing round the Nürburgring Nordschleife, for example, with the Porsche Carrera GT.

Röhrl was expected to make his competitive return to the Nürburgring 24-hour race in 2010 at the wheel of a Porsche 911 GT3 RS. However, he was forced to withdraw from the event due to a back injury. It was to be his first 24-hour race in 17 years, since his last start in 1993.

== Complete WRC results ==
Year	Entrant	Car	1	2	3	4	5	6	7	8	9	10	11	12	13	WDC	Points
1973	Irmscher Tuning	Opel Commodore GS/E	MON; 45	SWE	POR	KEN	MOR	GRE	POL	FIN						N/A	N/A
1973	Irmscher Tuning	Opel Ascona									AUT; Ret	ITA	USA	GBR; Ret	FRA	N/A	N/A
1974	Opel Euro Händler Team	Opel Ascona	POR; Ret	KEN	FIN	ITA	CAN	USA	GBR; 5	FRA						N/A	N/A
1975	Opel Euro Händler Team	Opel Ascona	MON; Ret	SWE	KEN	GRE; 1	MOR; Ret	POR; Ret	FIN							N/A	N/A
1975	Opel Euro Händler Team	Opel Kadett GT/E								ITA; Ret	FRA	GBR; Ret				N/A	N/A
1976	Opel Euro Händler Team	Opel Kadett GT/E	MON; 4	SWE	POR; Ret	KEN; Ret	GRE	MOR	FIN	ITA; Ret	FRA; Ret	GBR; Ret				N/A	N/A
1977	Opel Euro Händler Team	Opel Kadett GT/E	MON; Ret	SWE	POR	KEN	NZL	GRE; Ret	FIN				GBR; Ret			NC	0
1977	Fiat S.p.A.	Fiat 131 Abarth								CAN; Ret	ITA; Ret	FRA				NC	0
1978	Alitalia Fiat	Fiat 131 Abarth	MON; 4	SWE	KEN	POR; Ret	GRE; 1	FIN	CAN; 1	ITA; Ret	CIV	FRA	GBR; 6			6th	13
1979	Alitalia Fiat	Fiat 131 Abarth	MON; Ret	SWE	POR	KEN; 8	GRE	NZL	FIN	CAN	ITA; 2	FRA	GBR; 8	CIV		9th	21
1980	Fiat Italia	Fiat 131 Abarth	MON; 1	SWE	POR; 1	KEN	GRE; 5	ARG; 1	FIN	NZL; 2		FRA; 2	GBR	CIV		1st	118
1980	Jolly Club	Fiat 131 Abarth									ITA; 1					1st	118
1981	Eminence	Porsche 911 SC	MON	SWE	POR	KEN	FRA	GRE	ARG	BRA	FIN	ITA; Ret	CIV	GBR		NC	0
1982	Rothmans Opel Rally Team	Opel Ascona 400	MON; 1	SWE; 3	POR; Ret	KEN; 2	FRA; 4	GRE; 2	NZL; 3	BRA; 2	FIN	ITA; 3	CIV; 1	GBR		1st	109
1983	Martini Lancia	Lancia 037 Rally	MON; 1	SWE	POR; 3	KEN	FRA; 2	GRE; 1	NZL; 1	ARG	FIN	ITA; 2	CIV	GBR		2nd	102
1984	Audi Sport	Audi Quattro A2	MON; 1	SWE	POR; 6	KEN			NZL; Ret	ARG	FIN					11th	26
1984	Audi Sport	Audi Sport Quattro					FRA; Ret	GRE; Ret				ITA; Ret	CIV	GBR		11th	26
1985	Audi Sport	Audi Sport Quattro	MON; 2	SWE; Ret	POR; 3	KEN	FRA; Ret	GRE; Ret	NZL; 3	ARG	FIN					3rd	59
1985	Audi Sport	Audi Sport Quattro S1 E2										ITA; 1	CIV	GBR; Ret		3rd	59
1986	Audi Sport	Audi Sport Quattro S1 E2	MON; 4	SWE	POR; Ret	KEN	FRA	GRE	NZL	ARG	FIN	CIV	ITA	GBR	USA	22nd	10
1987	Audi Sport	Audi 200 Quattro	MON; 3	SWE	POR	KEN; 2	FRA	GRE; Ret	USA	NZL	ARG	FIN	CIV	ITA	GBR	11th	27

== WRC victories ==
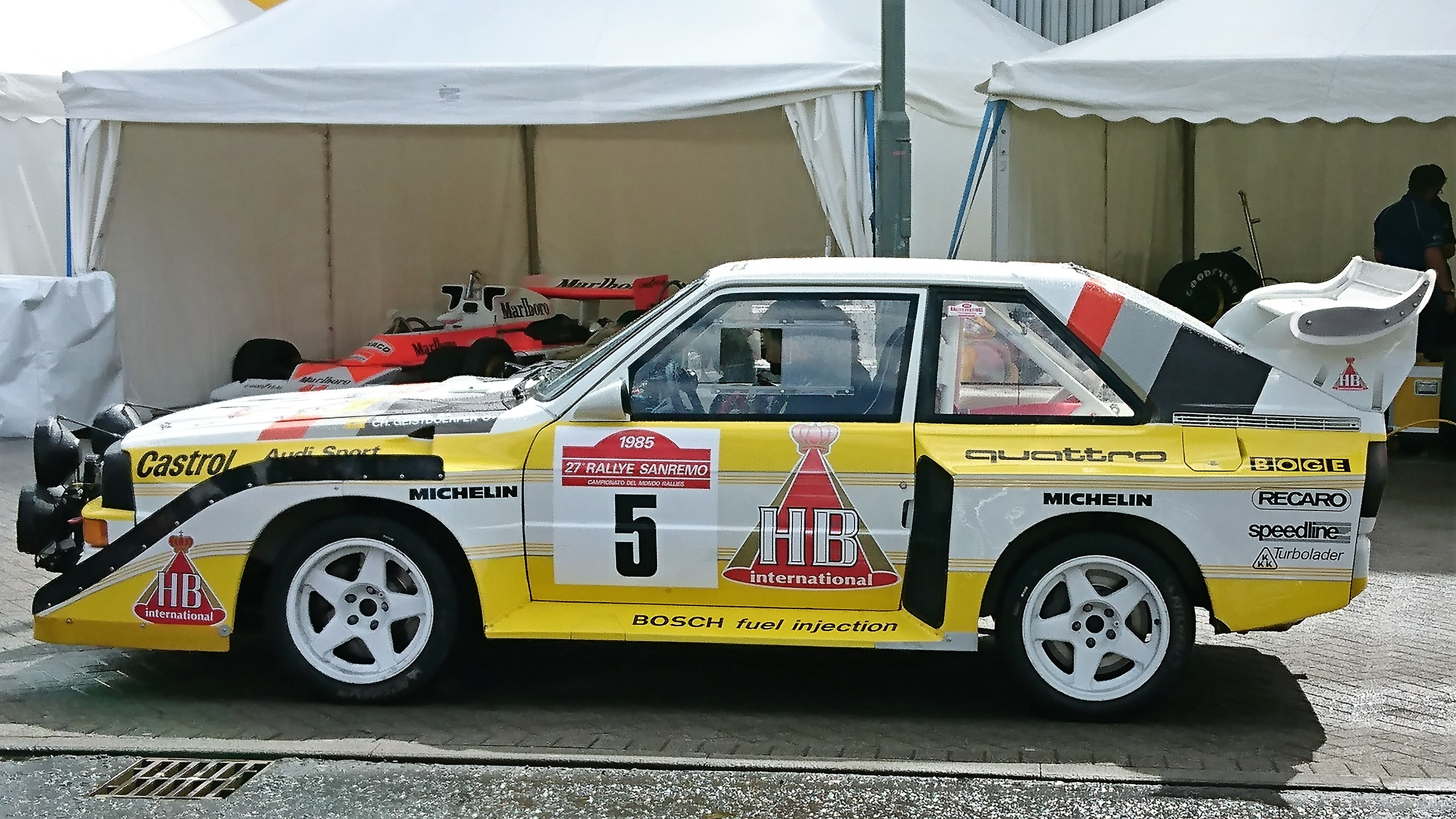
Röhrl's final WRC victory came at the wheel of an Audi Sport Quattro S1 E2 at the 1985 Rallye Sanremo. The car was paraded at the Ignition Festival of Motoring in 2017.

#	Event	Season	Co-driver	Car
1	(Greece) Acropolis Rally	1975	(Germany) Jochen Berger	Opel Ascona
2	(Greece) Acropolis Rally	1978	(Germany) Christian Geistdörfer	Fiat 131 Abarth
3	(Canada) Critérium du Québec	1978	(Germany) Christian Geistdörfer	Fiat 131 Abarth
4	(Monaco) Rally Monte Carlo	1980	(Germany) Christian Geistdörfer	Fiat 131 Abarth
5	Rally Portugal	1980	(Germany) Christian Geistdörfer	Fiat 131 Abarth
6	Rally Argentina	1980	(Germany) Christian Geistdörfer	Fiat 131 Abarth
7	(Italy) Rally Sanremo	1980	(Germany) Christian Geistdörfer	Fiat 131 Abarth
8	(Monaco) Rally Monte Carlo	1982	(Germany) Christian Geistdörfer	Opel Ascona 400
9	(Ivory Coast) Rallye Côte d'Ivoire	1982	(Germany) Christian Geistdörfer	Opel Ascona 400
10	(Monaco) Rally Monte Carlo	1983	(Germany) Christian Geistdörfer	Lancia 037 Rally
11	(Greece) Acropolis Rally	1983	(Germany) Christian Geistdörfer	Lancia 037 Rally
12	Rally New Zealand	1983	(Germany) Christian Geistdörfer	Lancia 037 Rally
13	(Monaco) Rally Monte Carlo	1984	(Germany) Christian Geistdörfer	Audi Quattro A2
14	(Italy) Rally Sanremo	1985	(Germany) Christian Geistdörfer	Audi Quattro Sport S1

== 24 Hours of Le Mans results ==
Year	Team	Co-Drivers	Car	Class	Laps	Pos.	Class Pos.
1981	(Germany) Porsche System	(Germany) Jürgen Barth	Porsche 944 LM	GTP +3.0	323	7	1st
1993	(Germany) Le Mans Porsche Team	(United States) Hurley Haywood (Germany) Hans-Joachim Stuck	Porsche 911 Turbo S LM-GT	GT	79	DNF	DNF

== Bibliography ==
- Robert Weber (June 2025). Automobilsport Racing / History / Passion #44: Walter Röhrl. Sportfahrer Verlag. ISSN 2199-126X.

Sporting positions
Preceded by Sandro Munari	European Rally champion 1974	Succeeded by Maurizio Verini
Preceded by Björn Waldegård	World Rally champion 1980	Succeeded by Ari Vatanen
Preceded by Ari Vatanen	World Rally champion 1982	Succeeded by Hannu Mikkola
Preceded by Shekhar Mehta	African Rally champion 1982	Succeeded by Alain Ambrosino
Preceded by Marc Duez	Race of Champions; Classic Master; 1997	Succeeded by Miki Biasion
Records
Preceded by Björn Waldegård; 36 years, 32 days (1979 season)	Youngest World Rally champion 33 years, 232 days (1980 season)	Succeeded by Ari Vatanen; 29 years, 212 days (1981 season)
