= 1980 World Rally Championship =

8th season of the World Rally Championship series

Champions
- World Drivers' Champion: Walter Röhrl
- World Manufacturers' Champion: Fiat

Seasons
- ← 1979 1981 →

The 1980 World Rally Championship was the eighth season of the Fédération Internationale de l'Automobile (FIA) World Rally Championship (WRC). The season consisted of 12 rallies. While this number was the same as the previous year, one change was made to the schedule, replacing Quebec with the Rally Codasur, marking the first WRC event to be held in South America.

A new driver's champion was crowned, with Fiat backed German driver Walter Röhrl taking the championship convincingly while simultaneously earning for Fiat its third and final manufacturer's title. Finn Hannu Mikkola and Swede Björn Waldegård again battled to a one-point difference in the standings, though this time for second place overall, and this time with Mikkola coming out on top. Fiat's position in the standings was challenged by both Datsun and Ford, but neither could overcome the Italian company's initial lead, settling instead for second and third, respectively. 1980 also saw Mercedes-Benz's best and final effort to compete for a WRC title, placing fourth overall.

For purposes of the championship, neither the Swedish or Finnish rallies were applied to the WRC for Manufacturers.

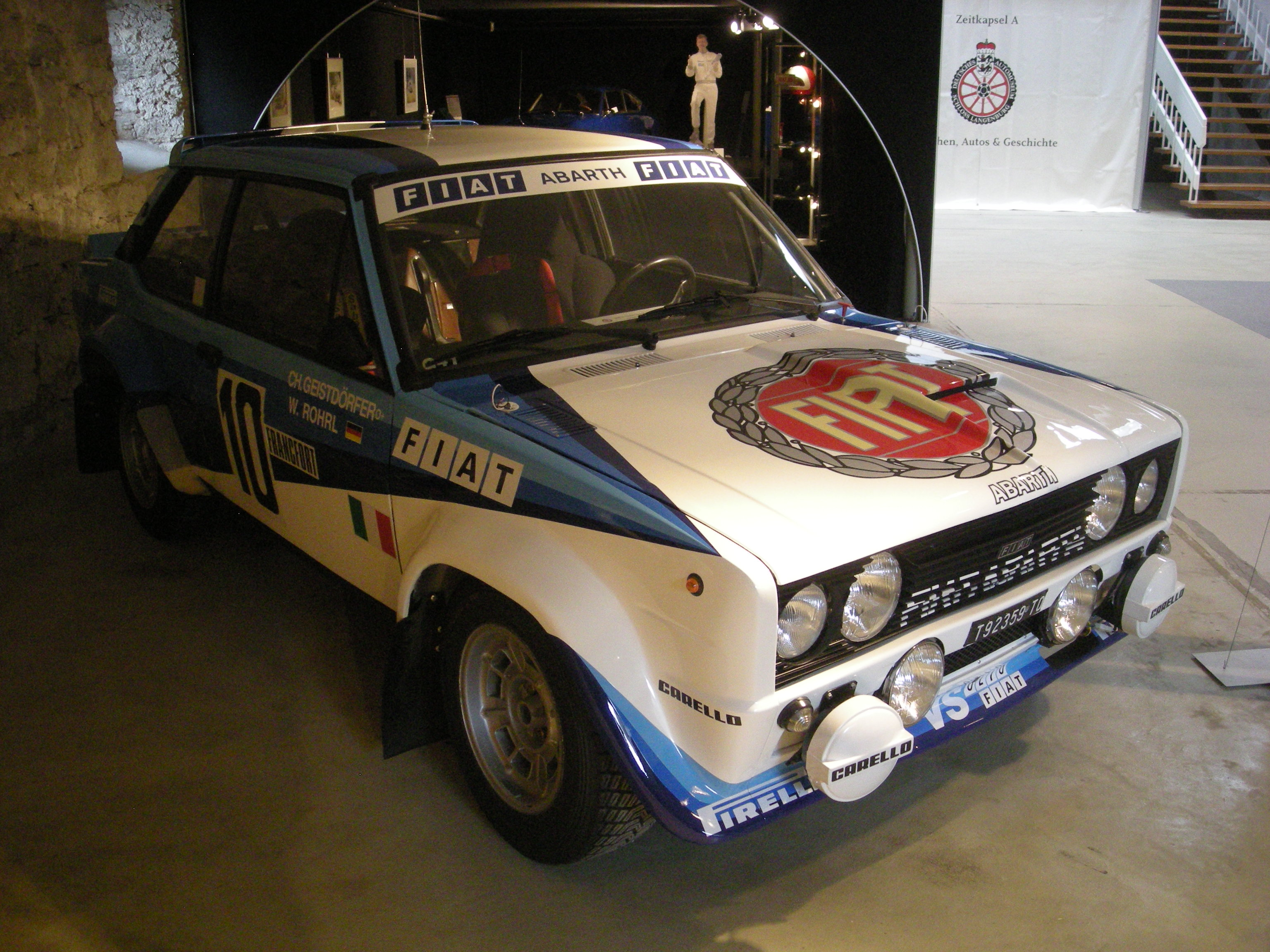
Walter Röhrl won his first WRC drivers' title at the wheel of a Fiat 131 Abarth.

== Calendar ==
Rd.	Start date	Finish date	Rally	Rally headquarters	Surface	Stages	Distance	Points
1	19 January	25 January	(Monaco) 48th Rallye Automobile Monte-Carlo	Monte Carlo	Mixed	33	695.30 km	Drivers & Manufacturers
2	15 February	17 February	(Sweden) 30th International Swedish Rally	Karlstad, Värmland County	Snow	29	413.50 km	Drivers only
3	4 March	9 March	14th Rallye de Portugal - Vinho do Porto	Estoril, Lisbon	Mixed	47	673.50 km	Drivers & Manufacturers
4	3 April	7 April	(Kenya) 28th Marlboro Safari Rally	Nairobi	Gravel	N/A	5441 km	Drivers & Manufacturers
5	26 May	29 May	(Greece) 27th Acropolis Rally	Athens	Gravel	56	956.16 km	Drivers & Manufacturers
6	19 July	24 July	(Argentina) 2nd Rally Codasur Ultra Movil YPF	Tucumán	Gravel	14	1223.7 km	Drivers & Manufacturers
7	29 August	31 August	(Finland) 30th Jyväskylän Suurajot - Rally of the 1000 Lakes	Jyväskylä, Central Finland	Gravel	48	471.9 km	Drivers only
8	13 September	17 September	11th Motogard Rally of New Zealand	Nelson, Christchurch	Gravel	41	1034 km	Drivers & Manufacturers
9	6 October	11 October	(Italy) 22nd Rallye Sanremo	Sanremo, Liguria	Mixed	51	800.60 km	Drivers & Manufacturers
10	24 October	25 October	24th Tour de Corse ESSO - Rallye de France	Ajaccio, Corsica	Tarmac	18	1128.1 km	Drivers & Manufacturers
11	16 November	19 November	(United Kingdom) 36th Lombard RAC Rally	Bath, Somerset	Gravel	70	708.09 km	Drivers & Manufacturers
12	9 December	14 December	(Ivory Coast) 12th Rallye Cote d'Ivoire	Abidjan	Gravel	N/A	5226 km	Drivers & Manufacturers

== Championships ==
=== Manufacturers ===
1980 World Rally Championship for Manufacturers
Rank	Manufacturer	Event										Total points
Rank	Manufacturer	(Monaco) MON	(Portugal) POR	(Kenya) KEN	(Greece) GRC	(Argentina) ARG	(New Zealand) NZL	(Italy) ITA	(France) FRA	(United Kingdom) GBR	(Ivory Coast) CIV	Total points
1	(Italy) Fiat	18	18	–	15	18	17	18	16	–	(11)	120
2	(Japan) Datsun	–	–	18	17	14	18	–	13	8	5	93
3	(United Kingdom) Ford	8	12	–	18	11	8	16	–	17	–	90
4	(Germany) Mercedes	–	13	16	–	17	15	–	–	–	18	79
5	(Germany) Opel	12	–	13	13	–	–	10	10	13	–	71
6	(United Kingdom) Talbot	–	16	–	–	–	–	15	–	18	–	49
7	(Japan) Toyota	–	9	–	9	–	–	–	–	–	14	32
8	(France) Peugeot	–	–	–	2	12	–	–	–	–	16	30
9	(Germany) Porsche	10	–	–	–	–	–	–	18	–	–	28
10	(Italy) Lancia	16	–	–	4	–	–	–	–	–	–	20
11	(United Kingdom) Vauxhall	–	–	–	–	–	12	–	–	4	–	16
12	(Germany) Volkswagen	14	–	–	–	–	–	–	–	–	–	14
13	(France) Renault	–	–	–	–	–	–	–	12	–	–	12
14	(United Kingdom) Triumph	–	–	–	–	–	–	–	–	9	–	9
15	(Japan) Mitsubishi	–	–	–	–	–	2	–	–	–	7	9
16	(Poland) FSO	–	2	–	–	–	–	–	–	–	–	2

1980 World Rally Championship point awards for manufacturers
Overall finish	Group finish									
Overall finish	1	2	3	4	5	6	7	8	9	10
1	18	–	–	–	–	–	–	–	–	–
2	17	16	–	–	–	–	–	–	–	–
3	16	15	14	–	–	–	–	–	–	–
4	15	14	13	12	–	–	–	–	–	–
5	14	13	12	11	10	–	–	–	–	–
6	13	12	11	10	9	8	–	–	–	–
7	12	11	10	9	8	7	6	–	–	–
8	11	10	9	8	7	6	5	4	–	–
9	10	9	8	7	6	5	4	3	2	–
10	9	8	7	6	5	4	3	2	1	1

=== Drivers ===
1980 World Rally Championship for Drivers
Rank	Driver	Event												Total points
Rank	Driver	(Monaco) MON	(Sweden) SWE	(Portugal) POR	(Kenya) KEN	(Greece) GRC	(Argentina) ARG	(Finland) FIN	(New Zealand) NZL	(Italy) ITA	(France) FRA	(United Kingdom) GBR	(Ivory Coast) CIV	Total points
1	(West Germany) Walter Röhrl	20	–	20	–	8	20	–	15	20	15	–	–	118
2	(Finland) Hannu Mikkola	–	10	–	–	–	15	–	12	12	–	15	–	64
3	(Sweden) Björn Waldegård	12	12	10	1	–	–	–	8	–	–	–	20	63
4	(Finland) Ari Vatanen	–	–	–	–	20	–	15	–	15	–	–	–	50
5	(Sweden) Anders Kulläng	10	20	–	–	10	–	–	–	–	–	8	–	48
6	(Finland) Markku Alén	–	–	15	–	12	–	20	–	–	–	–	–	47
7	(Finland) Timo Salonen	–	4	–	–	15	–	6	20	–	–	–	–	45
8	(France) Guy Fréquelin	–	–	12	–	–	–	–	–	10	–	12	–	34
9	(Kenya) Shekhar Mehta	–	–	–	20	–	10	–	–	–	–	–	–	30
10	(Finland) Henri Toivonen	–	–	–	–	–	–	–	–	8	–	20	–	28
11	(Sweden) Per Eklund	8	3	–	–	–	–	12	–	–	–	–	4	27
12	(France) Jean-Luc Thérier	–	–	–	–	–	–	–	–	–	20	–	–	20
13	(Kenya) Vic Preston Jr.	–	–	–	12	–	–	–	–	–	–	–	8	20
14	(Argentina) Jorge Recalde	–	–	3	–	–	–	–	–	–	–	–	15	18
15	(Sweden) Björn Johansson	–	8	–	–	–	–	10	–	–	–	–	–	18
16	(France) Bernard Darniche	15	–	–	–	–	–	–	–	–	–	–	–	15
16	(Sweden) Stig Blomqvist	–	15	–	–	–	–	–	–	–	–	–	–	15
16	(Finland) Rauno Aaltonen	–	–	–	15	–	–	–	–	–	–	–	–	15
19	(Italy) Attilio Bettega	6	–	–	–	3	–	–	–	6	–	–	–	15
20	(France) Alain Coppier	2	–	–	–	–	–	–	–	–	12	–	–	14
21	(Argentina) Carlos Reutemann	–	–	–	–	–	12	–	–	–	–	–	–	12
21	(France) Alain Ambrosino	–	–	–	–	–	–	–	–	–	–	–	12	12
23	(France) Michèle Mouton	4	–	–	–	–	–	–	–	–	8	–	–	12
24	(Sweden) Ove Andersson	–	–	6	–	6	–	–	–	–	–	–	–	12
25	(France) Jean-Claude Lefèbvre	–	–	–	–	–	8	–	–	–	–	–	3	11
26	(Kenya) Mike Kirkland	–	–	–	10	–	–	–	–	–	–	–	–	10
26	(Australia) George Fury	–	–	–	–	–	–	–	10	–	–	–	–	10
26	(France) Bruno Saby	–	–	–	–	–	–	–	–	–	10	–	–	10
26	(United Kingdom) Russell Brookes	–	–	–	–	–	–	–	–	–	–	10	–	10
26	(Lebanon) Samir Assef	–	–	–	–	–	–	–	–	–	–	–	10	10
31	(Sweden) Ingvar Carlsson	–	1	8	–	–	–	–	–	–	–	–	–	9
32	(United Kingdom) Andy Dawson	–	–	–	–	–	–	–	–	–	6	3	–	9
33	(France) Jean-Pierre Nicolas	–	–	–	8	–	–	–	–	–	–	–	–	8
33	(Finland) Lasse Lampi	–	–	–	–	–	–	8	–	–	–	–	–	8
35	(Finland) Timo Mäkinen	–	–	–	–	1	–	–	–	–	–	6	–	7
36	(Finland) Pentti Airikkala	–	6	–	–	–	–	–	–	–	–	–	–	6
36	(United Kingdom) Andrew Cowan	–	–	–	6	–	–	–	–	–	–	–	–	6
36	(Uruguay) Domingo De Vitta	–	–	–	–	–	6	–	–	–	–	–	–	6
36	(New Zealand) Paul Adams	–	–	–	–	–	–	–	6	–	–	–	–	6
36	(Italy) Sandro Munari	–	–	–	–	–	–	–	–	–	–	–	6	6
41	(West Germany) Jochi Kleint	3	–	–	2	–	–	–	–	–	–	–	–	5
42	(Portugal) Carlos Torres	–	–	4	–	–	–	–	–	–	–	–	–	4
42	(Japan) Yoshio Iwashita	–	–	–	4	–	–	–	–	–	–	–	–	4
42	(Sweden) Harry Källström	–	–	–	–	4	–	–	–	–	–	–	–	4
42	(Argentina) Francisco Alcuaz	–	–	–	–	–	4	–	–	–	–	–	–	4
42	(Finland) Tapio Rainio	–	–	–	–	–	–	4	–	–	–	–	–	4
42	(New Zealand) Paddy Davidson	–	–	–	–	–	–	–	4	–	–	–	–	4
42	(Italy) Angelo Presotto	–	–	–	–	–	–	–	–	4	–	–	–	4
42	(France) Christian Gardavot	–	–	–	–	–	–	–	–	–	4	–	–	4
42	(United Kingdom) Tony Pond	–	–	–	–	–	–	–	–	–	–	4	–	4
51	(Kenya) Johnny Hellier	–	–	–	3	–	–	–	–	–	–	–	–	3
51	(Argentina) Nestor García-Veiga	–	–	–	–	–	3	–	–	–	–	–	–	3
51	(Finland) Erkki Pitkänen	–	–	–	–	–	–	3	–	–	–	–	–	3
51	(New Zealand) David Parkes	–	–	–	–	–	–	–	3	–	–	–	–	3
51	(Italy) Antonillo Zordan	–	–	–	–	–	–	–	–	3	–	–	–	3
51	(France) Paul Rouby	–	–	–	–	–	–	–	–	–	3	–	–	3
57	(Spain) Salvador Servià	2	–	–	–	–	–	–	–	–	–	–	–	2
57	(Sweden) Bengt Nilsson	–	2	–	–	–	–	–	–	–	–	–	–	2
57	(Monaco) Raymond 'Ray' Rué	–	–	2	–	–	–	–	–	–	–	–	–	2
57	(Greece) Tasos 'Siroco' Livieratos	–	–	–	–	2	–	–	–	–	–	–	–	2
57	(Uruguay) Federico West	–	–	–	–	–	2	–	–	–	–	–	–	2
57	(Finland) Heikki Enomaa	–	–	–	–	–	–	2	–	–	–	–	–	2
57	(New Zealand) Glenn McIntyre	–	–	–	–	–	–	–	2	–	–	–	–	2
57	(Italy) Giorgio Bernocchi	–	–	–	–	–	–	–	–	2	–	–	–	2
57	(France) Jean-Felix Farrucci	–	–	–	–	–	–	–	–	–	2	–	–	2
57	(Sweden) Bror Danielsson	–	–	–	–	–	–	–	–	–	–	2	–	2
57	(France) Jean-François Vincens	–	–	–	–	–	–	–	–	–	–	–	2	2
68	(Poland) Maciej Stawowiak	–	–	1	–	–	–	–	–	–	–	–	–	1
68	(Argentina) Jorge Maggi	–	–	–	–	–	1	–	–	–	–	–	–	1
68	(Finland) Peter Geitel	–	–	–	–	–	–	1	–	–	–	–	–	1
68	(New Zealand) Morrie Chandler	–	–	–	–	–	–	–	1	–	–	–	–	1
68	(Italy) Massimo Paolieri	–	–	–	–	–	–	–	–	1	–	–	–	1
68	(France) Jean Bagarry	–	–	–	–	–	–	–	–	–	1	–	–	1
68	(United Kingdom) George Hill	–	–	–	–	–	–	–	–	–	–	1	–	1
68	(Ivory Coast) Naguib Saad	–	–	–	–	–	–	–	–	–	–	–	1	1

1980 World Rally Championship point awards for drivers
Points awarded by finish	1st	2nd	3rd	4th	5th	6th	7th	8th	9th	10th
Points awarded by finish	20	15	12	10	8	6	4	3	2	1

== Events ==
1980 World Rally Championship event map
Black = Tarmac	Brown = Gravel	Blue = Snow/Ice	Red = Mixed Surface

1980 World Rally Championship schedule and results
Round	Rally name	Stages	Podium finishers				
Round	Rally name	Stages	Rank	Driver	Co-driver	Car	Time
1	(Monaco) Rallye Automobile Monte Carlo ( 19 – 25 January)	30 stages 601 km Tarmac	1	(West Germany) Walter Röhrl	(West Germany) Christian Geistdörfer	Fiat 131 Abarth	8:42:20
1	(Monaco) Rallye Automobile Monte Carlo ( 19 – 25 January)	30 stages 601 km Tarmac	2	(France) Bernard Darniche	(France) Alain Mahé	Lancia Stratos HF	8:52:58
1	(Monaco) Rallye Automobile Monte Carlo ( 19 – 25 January)	30 stages 601 km Tarmac	3	(Sweden) Björn Waldegård	(Sweden) Hans Thorszelius	Fiat 131 Abarth	8:53:48
2	(Sweden) Swedish Rally ( 15 – 17 February)	29 stages 413.5 km Snow/Ice	1	(Sweden) Anders Kulläng	(Sweden) Bruno Berglund	Opel Ascona 400	4:17:52
2	(Sweden) Swedish Rally ( 15 – 17 February)	29 stages 413.5 km Snow/Ice	2	(Sweden) Stig Blomqvist	(Sweden) Björn Cederberg	Saab 99 Turbo	4:19:22
2	(Sweden) Swedish Rally ( 15 – 17 February)	29 stages 413.5 km Snow/Ice	3	(Sweden) Björn Waldegård	(Sweden) Hans Thorszelius	Fiat 131 Abarth	4:21:39
3	Rallye de Portugal ( 4 – 9 March)	47 stages 673.5 km Gravel/Tarmac	1	(West Germany) Walter Röhrl	(West Germany) Christian Geistdörfer	Fiat 131 Abarth	8:45:35
3	Rallye de Portugal ( 4 – 9 March)	47 stages 673.5 km Gravel/Tarmac	2	(Finland) Markku Alén	(Finland) Ilkka Kivimäki	Fiat 131 Abarth	8:59:54
3	Rallye de Portugal ( 4 – 9 March)	47 stages 673.5 km Gravel/Tarmac	3	(France) Guy Fréquelin	(France) Jean Todt	Talbot Sunbeam Lotus	9:16:04
4	(Kenya) Safari Rally ( 3 – 7 April)	95 controls 5333 km Gravel	1	(Kenya) Shekhar Mehta	(Kenya) Mike Doughty	Datsun 160J	+3:27 pen
4	(Kenya) Safari Rally ( 3 – 7 April)	95 controls 5333 km Gravel	2	(Finland) Rauno Aaltonen	(Kenya) Lofty Drews	Datsun 160J	+4:02 pen
4	(Kenya) Safari Rally ( 3 – 7 April)	95 controls 5333 km Gravel	3	(Kenya) Vic Preston Jr.	(Kenya) John Lyall	Mercedes 450 SLC 5.0	+5:07 pen
5	(Greece) Acropolis Rally ( 25 – 29 May)	56 stages 964 km Gravel/Tarmac	1	(Finland) Ari Vatanen	(United Kingdom) David Richards	Ford Escort RS1800	12:55:44
5	(Greece) Acropolis Rally ( 25 – 29 May)	56 stages 964 km Gravel/Tarmac	2	(Finland) Timo Salonen	(Finland) Seppo Harjanne	Datsun 160J	12:58:26
5	(Greece) Acropolis Rally ( 25 – 29 May)	56 stages 964 km Gravel/Tarmac	3	(Finland) Markku Alén	(Finland) Ilkka Kivimäki	Fiat 131 Abarth	13:02:48
6	(Argentina) Rally Codasur ( 19 – 24 July)	18 stages 1224.4 km Gravel/Tarmac	1	(West Germany) Walter Röhrl	(West Germany) Christian Geistdörfer	Fiat 131 Abarth	12:48:36
6	(Argentina) Rally Codasur ( 19 – 24 July)	18 stages 1224.4 km Gravel/Tarmac	2	(Finland) Hannu Mikkola	(Sweden) Arne Hertz	Mercedes 500 SLC	13:04:35
6	(Argentina) Rally Codasur ( 19 – 24 July)	18 stages 1224.4 km Gravel/Tarmac	3	(Argentina) Carlos Reutemann	(Italy) Mirko Perissutti	Fiat 131 Abarth	13:35.26
7	(Finland) 1000 Lakes Rally ( 29 – 31 August)	48 stages 472 km Gravel	1	(Finland) Markku Alén	(Finland) Ilkka Kivimäki	Fiat 131 Abarth	4:24:11
7	(Finland) 1000 Lakes Rally ( 29 – 31 August)	48 stages 472 km Gravel	2	(Finland) Ari Vatanen	(United Kingdom) David Richards	Ford Escort RS1800	4:25:07
7	(Finland) 1000 Lakes Rally ( 29 – 31 August)	48 stages 472 km Gravel	3	(Sweden) Per Eklund	(Sweden) Hans Sylvan	Triumph TR 7 V8	4:35:25
8	Rally New Zealand ( 13 – 17 September)	40 stages 1040 km Gravel	1	(Finland) Timo Salonen	(Finland) Seppo Harjanne	Datsun 160J	12:06:57
8	Rally New Zealand ( 13 – 17 September)	40 stages 1040 km Gravel	2	(West Germany) Walter Röhrl	(West Germany) Christian Geistdörfer	Fiat 131 Abarth	12:09:38
8	Rally New Zealand ( 13 – 17 September)	40 stages 1040 km Gravel	3	(Finland) Hannu Mikkola	(Sweden) Arne Hertz	Mercedes 500 SLC	12:29:22
9	(Italy) Rallye Sanremo ( 6 – 11 October)	50 stages 821 km Gravel	1	(West Germany) Walter Röhrl	(West Germany) Christian Geistdörfer	Fiat 131 Abarth	10:22:42
9	(Italy) Rallye Sanremo ( 6 – 11 October)	50 stages 821 km Gravel	2	(Finland) Ari Vatanen	(United Kingdom) David Richards	Ford Escort RS1800	10:29:17
9	(Italy) Rallye Sanremo ( 6 – 11 October)	50 stages 821 km Gravel	3	(Finland) Hannu Mikkola	(Sweden) Arne Hertz	Ford Escort RS	10:36:52
10	Rallye de France ( 24 – 25 October)	18 stages 1128 km Tarmac	1	(France) Jean-Luc Thérier	(France) Michel Vial	Porsche 911 SC	14:51:43
10	Rallye de France ( 24 – 25 October)	18 stages 1128 km Tarmac	2	(West Germany) Walter Röhrl	(West Germany) Christian Geistdörfer	Fiat 131 Abarth	15:02:06
10	Rallye de France ( 24 – 25 October)	18 stages 1128 km Tarmac	3	(France) Alain Coppier	(France) Josépha Laloz	Porsche 911 SC	15:17:21
11	(United Kingdom) RAC Rally ( 16 – 19 November)	70 stages 708 km Gravel/Tarmac	1	(Finland) Henri Toivonen	(United Kingdom) Paul White	Talbot Sunbeam Lotus	8:17:33
11	(United Kingdom) RAC Rally ( 16 – 19 November)	70 stages 708 km Gravel/Tarmac	2	(Finland) Hannu Mikkola	(Sweden) Arne Hertz	Ford Escort RS1800	8:22:09
11	(United Kingdom) RAC Rally ( 16 – 19 November)	70 stages 708 km Gravel/Tarmac	3	(France) Guy Fréquelin	(France) Jean Todt	Talbot Sunbeam Lotus	8:31:24
12	(Ivory Coast) Rallye Côte d'Ivoire ( 9 – 14 December)	62 controls 5336 km Gravel	1	(Sweden) Björn Waldegård	(Sweden) Hans Thorszelius	Mercedes 500 SLC	+2:36 pen
12	(Ivory Coast) Rallye Côte d'Ivoire ( 9 – 14 December)	62 controls 5336 km Gravel	2	(Argentina) Jorge Recalde	(Argentina) Nestor Straimel	Mercedes 500 SLC	+3:47 pen
12	(Ivory Coast) Rallye Côte d'Ivoire ( 9 – 14 December)	62 controls 5336 km Gravel	3	(France) Alain Ambrosino	(France) Jean-Robert Bureau	Peugeot 504 V6	+5:17 pen

== See also ==
- 1980 in sports
