= Christian Geistdörfer =

German rally co-driver (born 1953)

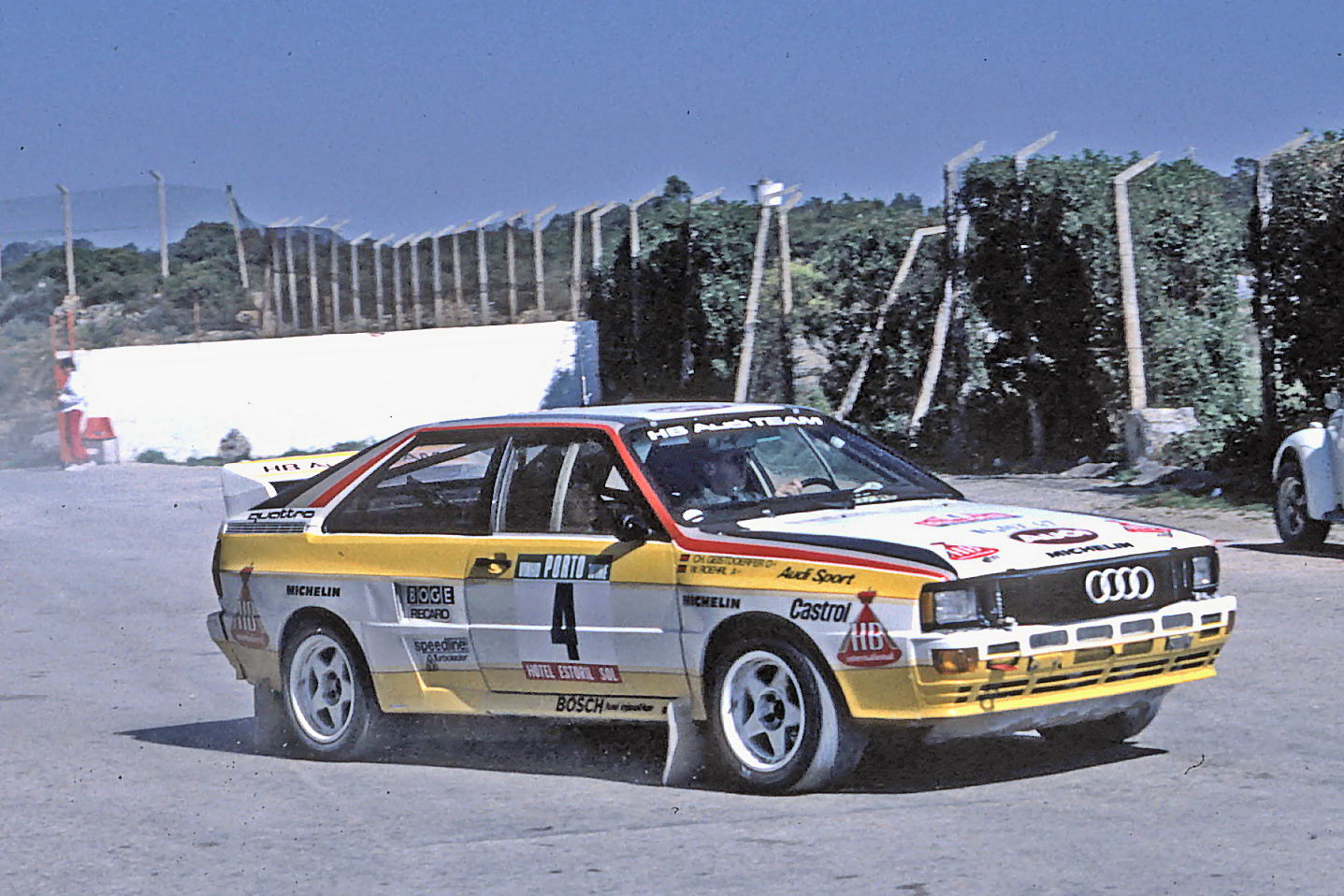
- Geistdörfer and Walter Röhrl in an Audi Quattro A2 at the 1984 Rally Portugal

Personal information
- Nationality: (Germany) German
- Born: February 1, 1953 (age 73); Munich, Germany

World Rally Championship record
- Years active: 1977–1989
- Driver: (Germany) Walter Röhrl (Finland) Hannu Mikkola
- Teams: Fiat, Opel, Lancia, Audi, Mazda
- Rallies: 61
- Championships: 2 (1980, 1982)
- Rally wins: 13
- Podiums: 30
- First rally: 1977 Critérium du Québec
- First win: 1978 Acropolis Rally
- Last win: 1985 Rallye Sanremo
- Last rally: 1989 1000 Lakes Rally

Christian Geistdörfer (born 1 February 1953 in Munich) is a German former rally co-driver. His career in motorsport lasted from 1975 to 1990. From 1977 to 1987, he co-drove for German rally driver Walter Röhrl, winning the World Rally Championship drivers' title in 1980 and 1982. The pair also won the Monte Carlo Rally four times. After Röhrl retired from the WRC, Geistdörfer co-drove to Hannu Mikkola in eight events in 1988 and 1989.
