= Raffaele Pinto =

Italian rally driver (1945–2020)

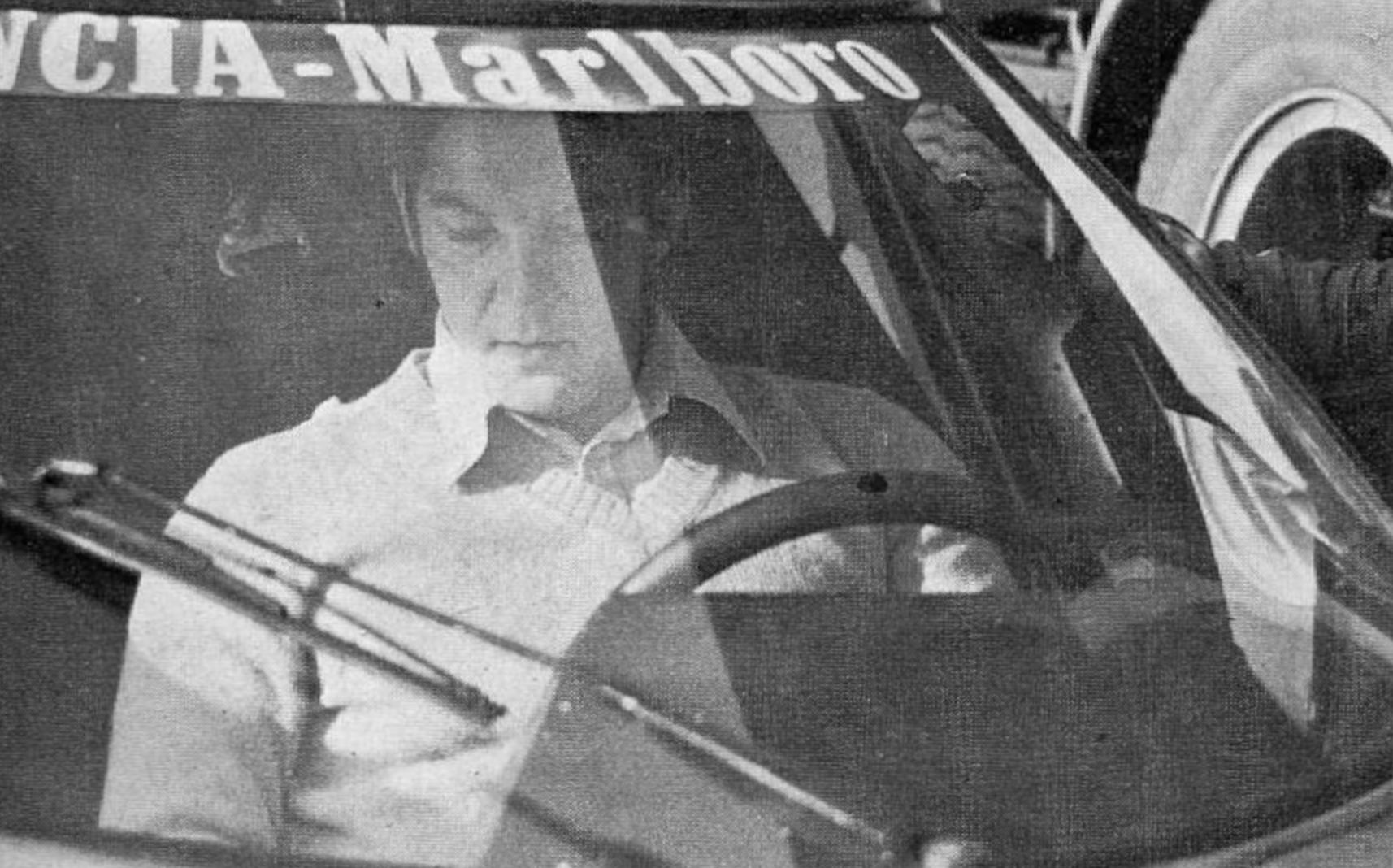
- Pinto testing the Lancia Stratos Turbo (1974)

Personal information
- Nationality: (Italy) Italian
- Born: 13 April 1945; Casnate, Italy
- Died: 8 December 2020 (aged 75); Cecina, Italy

World Rally Championship record
- Years active: 1973–1978
- Co-driver: (Italy) Arnaldo Bernacchini (Italy) Fabio Penariol
- Teams: Fiat, Lancia
- Rallies: 19
- Championships: 0
- Rally wins: 1
- Podiums: 3
- Stage wins: 42
- Total points: 0
- First rally: 1973 Monte Carlo Rally
- First win: 1974 Rally Portugal
- Last rally: 1978 Rally Sanremo

Raffaele "Lele" Pinto (13 April 1945 – 8 December 2020) was an Italian rally driver, who won the 1974 Rally Portugal and the 1979 Monza Rally Show.

== Career ==
Pinto began rallying in 1968. In 1972, he won the European Rally Championship in a Fiat 124 Sport Spider. The following year, the World Rally Championship was run for the first time, and Pinto competed with Fiat, winning the 1974 Rally Portugal. For 1975, he moved to Lancia, where he remained until the end of 1977, driving the legendary Lancia Stratos HF.

== WRC victories ==
| # | Event | Season | Co-driver | Car |
|---|---|---|---|---|
| 1 | 8th Rally de Portugal | 1974 | Arnaldo Bernacchini | Fiat Abarth 124 Rallye |

== Racing record ==
=== Complete IMC results ===
| Year | Entrant | Car | 1 | 2 | 3 | 4 | 5 | 6 | 7 | 8 | 9 |
|---|---|---|---|---|---|---|---|---|---|---|---|
| 1972 | Jolly Club | Fiat 124 Spider | MON; Ret | SWE | | | | | | | |
| 1972 | Fiat Auto Torino | Fiat 124 Spider | | | | | | | | | GBR; Ret |
| 1972 | Fiat Auto Torino | Fiat 125 S | | | KEN; Ret | MAR | GRE | AUT | ITA | USA | |

=== Complete WRC results ===
| Year | Entrant | Car | 1 | 2 | 3 | 4 | 5 | 6 | 7 | 8 | 9 | 10 | 11 | 12 | 13 | WDC | Pts |
|---|---|---|---|---|---|---|---|---|---|---|---|---|---|---|---|---|---|
| 1973 | Fiat Rally | Fiat 124 Abarth Rallye | MON; 7 | SWE | POR; Ret | KEN | MOR | GRE | POL | FIN | AUT; Ret | ITA; Ret | USA | GBR | FRA | N/A | N/A |
| 1974 | Fiat Rally | Fiat 124 Abarth Rallye | POR; 1 | KEN | FIN | ITA; Ret | CAN | USA | GBR | FRA; DSQ | | | | | | N/A | N/A |
| 1975 | Lancia Alitalia | Lancia Stratos HF | MON; Ret | SWE | KEN | GRE; Ret | MOR | POR | FIN | ITA; Ret | FRA; Ret | GBR | | | | N/A | N/A |
| 1976 | Lancia Alitalia | Lancia Stratos HF | MON; Ret | SWE | POR; 4 | KEN | GRC; Ret | MOR | FIN | ITA; 3 | FRA | GBR | | | | N/A | N/A |
| 1977 | Lancia Alitalia | Lancia Stratos HF | MON; Ret | SWE | POR | KEN | NZL | GRC | FIN | CAN | ITA; Ret | FRA; 2 | GBR | | | N/A | N/A |
| 1978 | Padova Corse | Ferrari 308 GTB | MON | SWE | KEN | POR | GRE | FIN | CAN | ITA; Ret | CIV | FRA | GBR | | | N/A | N/A |

Sporting positions
| Preceded by Sobiesław Zasada | European Rally Champion; 1972 | Succeeded by Sandro Munari |
