= Manuel Queirós Pereira =

Portuguese rally driver (born 1947)

Mêquêpê
Personal information
- Nationality: (Portugal) Portuguese
- Born: 21 November 1947 (age 79)

World Rally Championship record
- Years active: 1973-1980
- Co-driver: (Portugal) Jorge Mira Amaral (Portugal) João Baptista (Portugal) Miguel Vilar
- Rallies: 8
- Championships: 0
- Rally wins: 0
- Podiums: 1
- Stage wins: 0
- Total points: 0
- First rally: 1973 Rallye de Portugal
- Last rally: 1980 Rallye de Portugal

Manuel Queirós Pereira (born 21 November 1947), also known as Mequepe, is a Portuguese rally driver who competed in the WRC. On 14 March 1976, he finished third in the Rallye de Portugal.

== Racing record ==
=== Complete WRC results ===
Year	Entrant	Car	1	2	3	4	5	6	7	8	9	10	11	12	13	WDC	Pts
1973	Tofa / General Motors	Opel Ascona SR	MON	SWE	POR; 7	KEN	MOR	GRE	POL	FIN	AUT	ITA	USA	GBR	FRA	N/A	N/A
1974	Concessionários Opel	Opel Ascona SR	POR; Ret	KEN	FIN	ITA	CAN	USA	GBR	FRA						N/A	N/A
1975	Manuel Queirós Pereira	Opel Ascona SR	MON	SWE	KEN	GRE	MOR	POR; Ret	FIN	ITA	FRA	GBR				N/A	N/A
1976	Manuel Queirós Pereira	Opel Kadett GT/E	MON	SWE	POR; 3	KEN	GRC	MOR	FIN	ITA	FRA	GBR				N/A	N/A
1977	Manuel Queirós Pereira	Opel Kadett GT/E	MON	SWE	POR; 6	KEN	NZL	GRC	FIN	CAN	ITA	FRA	GBR			N/A	N/A
1978	Opel Euro Händler Team	Opel Kadett GT/E	MON	SWE	KEN	POR; Ret	GRE	FIN	CAN	ITA	CIV	FRA	GBR			N/A	N/A
1979	GM Portugal	Vauxhall Chevette 2300 HS	MON	SWE	POR; Ret	KEN	GRE	NZL	FIN	CAN	ITA	FRA	GBR	CIV		NC	0
1980	Manuel Queirós Pereira	Opel Kadett GT/E	MON	SWE	POR; Ret	KEN	GRC	ARG	FIN	NZL	ITA	FRA	GBR	CIV		26th	10
