= Bernard Darniche =

French rally driver (born 1942)

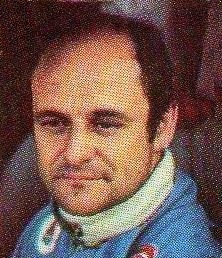

Personal information
- Nationality: (France) French
- Full name: Bernard Jean Darniche
- Born: 28 March 1942 (age 84); Cenon

World Rally Championship record
- Years active: 1973–1985, 1987
- Co-driver: (France) Alain Mahé
- Teams: Alpine-Renault, Fiat, Lancia, BMW, Audi
- Rallies: 38
- Championships: 0
- Rally wins: 7
- Podiums: 11
- Stage wins: 115
- Total points: 87
- First rally: 1973 Monte Carlo Rally
- First win: 1973 Rally of Morocco
- Last win: 1981 Tour de Corse
- Last rally: 1987 Tour de Corse

Bernard Jean Darniche (born 28 March 1942 in Cenon, a commune in the Gironde department) is a French former rally driver. He won the European Rally Championship in 1976 and 1977 and the French Rally Championship in 1976 and 1978, each time behind the wheel of a Lancia Stratos HF. He also holds the record for most victories in the Tour de Corse which he won six times (1970, 1975, 1977, 1978, 1979 and 1981), a feat later equalled by Didier Auriol.

Darniche competed in the first World Rally Championships in 1973, winning the 16th Moroccan Rally and placing second in the 44th Alpine Rally, and was one of the top competitors for the remainder of the decade. He finished third in the inaugural FIA Cup for Rally Drivers in 1977, the first of three successive top-ten finishes in the drivers' championship.

Darniche also won the Rallye Automobile Monte Carlo in 1979, the event where he holds the record for most wins on the infamous Col de Turini stage, a 1,600 m Alpine mountain pass normally driven in darkness. The so-called "Night of the Long Knives" has seen Darniche victorious on ten occasions.

== WRC victories ==
#	Event	Season	Co-driver	Car
1	(Morocco) 16ème Rallye du Maroc	1973	Alain Mahé	Alpine-Renault A110
2	(France) 19ème Tour de Corse	1975	Alain Mahé	Lancia Stratos HF
3	(France) 21ème Tour de Corse	1977	Alain Mahé	Fiat 131 Abarth
4	(France) 22ème Tour de Corse	1978	Alain Mahé	Fiat 131 Abarth
5	(Monaco) 47ème Rallye Monte-Carlo	1979	Alain Mahé	Lancia Stratos HF
6	(France) 23ème Tour de Corse	1979	Alain Mahé	Lancia Stratos HF
7	(France) 25ème Tour de Corse	1981	Alain Mahé	Lancia Stratos HF

== Racing record ==
=== Complete IMC results ===
Year	Entrant	Car	1	2	3	4	5	6	7	8	9
1970	Alpine Renault	Alpine-Renault A110 1600	MON	SWE	ITA	KEN	AUT; 5	GRE	GBR		
1971	Alpine Renault	Alpine-Renault A110 1600	MON; 8	SWE	ITA; 4	KEN	MAR	AUT	GRE	FRA; 1	GBR
1972	Alpine Renault	Alpine-Renault A110 1800	MON; 25	SWE	KEN	MAR	GRE	AUT	ITA	USA	GBR

=== Complete WRC results ===
Year	Entrant	Car	1	2	3	4	5	6	7	8	9	10	11	12	13	WDC	Pts
1973	Alpine Renault	Alpine-Renault A110 1800	MON; 10		POR; Ret	KEN	MOR; 1	GRE; Ret	POL	FIN	AUT; 2	ITA; Ret	USA	GBR	FRA; Ret	N/A	N/A
1973	Alpine Renault	Renault 12 Gordini		SWE; Ret												N/A	N/A
1974	Alpine Renault	Alpine-Renault A110 1800	POR	KEN; Ret	FIN	ITA	CAN									N/A	N/A
1974	Alpine Renault	Renault 17 Gordini						USA; 6	GBR							N/A	N/A
1974	Fiat S.p.A.	Fiat 124 Abarth Rallye								FRA; Ret						N/A	N/A
1975	Fiat S.p.A.	Fiat 124 Abarth Rallye	MON; Ret	SWE	KEN	GRE	MOR; Ret	POR	FIN	ITA						N/A	N/A
1975	Team Chardonnet	Lancia Stratos HF									FRA; 1	GBR				N/A	N/A
1976	Team Chardonnet	Lancia Stratos HF	MON; 3	SWE	POR	KEN	GRC	MOR	FIN	ITA	FRA; 2	GBR				N/A	N/A
1977	Lancia Alitalia	Lancia Stratos HF	MON; Ret	SWE	POR	KEN	NZL	GRC	FIN	CAN	ITA					N/A	N/A
1977	Fiat S.p.A.	Fiat 131 Abarth	MON	SWE	POR	KEN	NZL	GRC	FIN	CAN	ITA	FRA; 1	GBR			N/A	N/A
1978	Fiat Alitalia	Fiat 131 Abarth	MON; 5	SWE	KEN							FRA; 1	GBR			N/A	N/A
1978	Team Chardonnet	Lancia Stratos HF				POR; 3	GRE	FIN	CAN	ITA	CIV					N/A	N/A
1979	Team Chardonnet	Lancia Stratos HF	MON; 1	SWE	POR; Ret	KEN	GRE; Ret	NZL	FIN	CAN	ITA	FRA; 1	GBR	CIV		6th	40
1980	Team Chardonnet	Lancia Stratos HF	MON; 2	SWE	POR; Ret	KEN	GRC; Ret	ARG	FIN	NZL	ITA					16th	15
1980	Fiat Italia	Fiat 131 Abarth										FRA; Ret	GBR	CIV		16th	15
1981	Team Chardonnet	Lancia Stratos HF	MON; 6	SWE	POR	KEN	FRA; 1	GRC	ARG	BRA	FIN	ITA	CIV	GBR		12th	26
1982	BMW France	BMW M1	MON	SWE	POR	KEN	FRA; Ret	GRC	NZL	BRA	FIN	ITA	CIV	GBR		NC	0
1983	Audi Sport	Audi Quattro A2	MON	SWE	POR	KEN	FRA	GRC	NZL	ARG	FIN	ITA; 9	CIV	GBR		50th	2
1984	Yacco	Audi 80 Quattro	MON; 7	SWE	POR	KEN										36th	4
1984	Yacco	Audi Quattro A2					FRA; Ret	GRC	NZL	ARG	FIN	ITA	CIV	GBR		36th	4
1985	Gauloises Blondes	Peugeot 205 Turbo 16	MON	SWE	POR	KEN	FRA; Ret	GRC	NZL	ARG	FIN	ITA	CIV	GBR		NC	0
1987	Snobeck Racing Service	Mercedes-Benz 190E 2.3 16V	MON; Ret	SWE	POR	KEN	FRA; Ret	GRE	USA	NZL	ARG	FIN	CIV	ITA	GBR	NC	0

=== 24 Hours of Le Mans results ===
Year	Team	Co-drivers	Car	Class	Laps	Pos.	Class pos.
1972	(United States) John Greenwood Racing	(France) Alain Cudini (United States) John Greenwood	Chevrolet Corvette C3	GTS +5.0	82	DNF	DNF
1976	(United States) IMSA (United States) Greenwood Corvettes	(United States) John Greenwood	Chevrolet Corvette Stingray	IMSA; GT	29	DNF	DNF
1978	(France) Jean Rondeau	(France) Jacky Haran (France) Jean Rondeau	Rondeau M378-Cosworth	GTP	294	9th	1st
1979	(France) Jean Rondeau	(France) Jean Ragnotti	Rondeau M379-Cosworth	Gr. 6 S 3.0	292	5th	1st
1980	(Italy) Scuderia Lancia Corsa	(Italy) Teo Fabi (Germany) Hans Heyer	Lancia Montecarlo Turbo	Gr. 5 SP 2.0	6	DNF	DNF
1981	BMW Italie-France	(France) Philippe Alliot (Venezuela) Johnny Cecotto	BMW M1 Gr. 5	Gr. 5 SP +2.0	278	16th	3rd

Sporting positions
Preceded by Maurizio Verini	European Rally Champion; 1976–1977	Succeeded by Tony Carello
