= 1976 World Rally Championship =

4th season of the World Rally Championship

Champions
- World Manufacturers' Champion: Lancia

Seasons
- ← 1975 1977 →

The 1976 World Rally Championship was the fourth season of the Fédération Internationale de l'Automobile (FIA) World Rally Championship (WRC). 10 events were included on the schedule, as the series revisited the same locations as the previous season. The only change in the schedule was a slight shuffle in order, with Portugal being moved up to March from July.

Lancia again repeated its title, with the Stratos HF accumulating another four rally wins, and scoring more than twice as many points as its nearest competitor, Opel. The Ascona's consistency was enough for second place overall, despite no wins. Lancia's dynasty, however, would not continue, as this was to be the last WRC title for the Stratos.

From 1973 to 1978, the WRC only awarded a championship for manufacturers. Scoring was given for the highest placing entry for each manufacturer. Thus if a particular manufacturer was to place 2nd, 4th, and 10th, they would receive points for 2nd place only. However, the manufacturer would still gain an advantage in scoring from its other entries, as the points for the 4th and 10th place entries would be denied to other manufacturers.

== Calendar ==
Round	Rally name	Surface	Dates
1	(Monaco) 1976 Monte Carlo Rally	Mixed (Tarmac - Snow)	17–24 January
2	(Sweden) 1976 Swedish Rally	Snow	20–22 February
3	Rally de Portugal	Mixed (Tarmac - Gravel)	10–14 March
4	(Kenya) Safari Rally	Gravel	15–19 April
5	(Greece) Acropolis Rally	Gravel	22–28 May
6	(Morocco) Rallye du Maroc	Mixed (Tarmac - Gravel)	22–27 June
7	(Finland) 1000 Lakes Rally	Gravel	27–29 August
8	(Italy) Rallye Sanremo	Tarmac	6–9 October
9	(France) Tour de Corse	Tarmac	6–7 November
10	(United Kingdom) RAC Rally	Gravel	27–30 November

== Manufacturers' championship ==
Points were awarded to the best placed vehicle of each manufacturer.

Schedule of points by place:

Place	1st	2nd	3rd	4th	5th	6th	7th	8th	9th	10th
Points	20	15	12	10	8	6	4	3	2	1

Pos.	Manufacturer	(Monaco) MON	(Sweden) SWE	(Portugal) POR	(Kenya) KEN	(Greece) GRC	(Morocco) MAR	(Finland) FIN	(Italy) ITA	(France) FRA	(United Kingdom) GBR	Points
1	(Italy) Lancia	20	10	20	-	-	12	-	20	20	10	112
2	(Germany) Opel	10	12	12	-	8	-	-	8	3	4	57
3	(United Kingdom) Ford	8	-	4	-	-	-	15	-	-	20	47
4	(Sweden) Saab	-	20	-	-	-	-	8	-	-	15	43
5	(Japan) Datsun	-	-	6	4	20	-	6	-	-	3	39
6	(Japan) Toyota	-	-	15	-	-	-	12	-	-	8	35
7	(Italy) Fiat	6	-	-	-	-	-	20	6	-	-	32
8	(France) Peugeot	-	-	-	10	-	20	-	-	1	-	31
9	(France) Alpine-Renault	-	-	-	-	15	-	-	-	12	-	27
10	(Japan) Mitsubishi	-	-	-	20	-	-	-	-	-	-	20
11	(Germany) Porsche	4	-	-	-	-	-	-	2	8	-	14
12	(Italy) Alfa Romeo	1	-	-	1	10	-	-	-	-	-	12
13	(France) Citroën	-	-	-	-	-	10	-	-	-	-	10
14	(Soviet Union) Lada	-	-	-	-	6	-	-	-	-	-	6
14	(France) Renault	-	-	-	-	-	6	-	-	-	-	6
16	(Sweden) Volvo	-	4	-	-	-	-	-	-	-	-	4
16	(Germany) BMW	-	-	-	-	4	-	-	-	-	-	4
18	(Japan) Mazda	-	-	3	-	-	-	-	-	-	-	3
18	(Germany) Volkswagen	-	-	-	-	3	-	-	-	-	-	3
20	(United Kingdom) British Leyland Cars	-	-	-	-	-	-	-	-	-	2	2
21	(East Germany) Wartburg	-	-	-	-	1	-	-	-	-	-	1
Pos.	Manufacturer	(Monaco) MON	(Sweden) SWE	(Portugal) POR	(Kenya) KEN	(Greece) GRC	(Morocco) MAR	(Finland) FIN	(Italy) ITA	(France) FRA	(United Kingdom) GBR	Points

== Events ==
1976 World Rally Championship event map
Black = Tarmac	Brown = Gravel	Blue = Snow/Ice	Red = Mixed Surface

1976 World Rally Championship schedule and results
Rally Name	Start-End Date	Podium Drivers (Finishing Time)	Podium Cars
(Monaco) Rallye Monte Carlo	17–24 January	1. (Italy) Sandro Munari (6h:25m:10s); 2. (Sweden) Björn Waldegård (6h:26m:37s); 3. (France) Bernard Darniche (6h:31m:23s)	1. Lancia Stratos HF; 2. Lancia Stratos HF; 3. Lancia Stratos HF
(Sweden) Swedish Rally	20–22 February	1. (Sweden) Per Eklund (8h:08m:26s); 2. (Sweden) Stig Blomqvist (8h:10m:02s); 3. (Sweden) Anders Kulläng (8h:31m:10s)	1. Saab 96 V4; 2. Saab 96 V4; 3. Opel Ascona
Rallye de Portugal	10–14 March	1. (Italy) Sandro Munari (5h:41m:26s); 2. (Sweden) Ove Andersson (5h:44m:24s); 3. (Portugal) 'Mêquêpê' (6h:26m:37s)	1. Lancia Stratos HF; 2. Toyota Celica; 3. Opel Kadett GT/E
(Kenya) Safari Rally	15–19 April	1. (Kenya) Joginder Singh (+1m:57s penalties); 2. (Kenya) Robin Ulyate (+2m:21s penalties); 3. (United Kingdom) Andrew Cowan (+2m:42s penalties)	1. Mitsubishi Lancer 1600 GSR; 2. Mitsubishi Lancer 1600 GSR; 3. Mitsubishi Lancer 1600 GSR
(Greece) Acropolis Rally	22–28 May	1. (Sweden) Harry Källström (8h:43m:14s); 2. (Greece) 'Siroco' (8h:48m:38s); 3. (Kenya) Shekhar Mehta (9h:09m:53s)	1. Datsun 160J; 2. Alpine-Renault A110 1800; 3. Datsun 160J
(Morocco) Rallye du Maroc	22–27 June	1. (France) Jean-Pierre Nicolas (20h:20m:15s); 2. (Finland) Simo Lampinen (20h:42m:52s); 3. (Italy) Sandro Munari (21h:38m:38s)	1. Peugeot 504; 2. Peugeot 504; 3. Lancia Stratos HF
(Finland) 1000 Lakes Rally	27–29 August	1. (Finland) Markku Alén (4h:10m:18s); 2. (Finland) Pentti Airikkala (4h:11m:03s); 3. (Finland) Hannu Mikkola (4h:13m:32s)	1. Fiat 131 Abarth; 2. Ford Escort RS1800; 3. Toyota Celica
(Italy) Rallye Sanremo	6–9 October	1. (Sweden) Björn Waldegård (10h:27m:40s); 2. (Italy) Sandro Munari (10h:27m:44s); 3. (Italy) Raffaele Pinto (10h:37m:13s)	1. Lancia Stratos HF; 2. Lancia Stratos HF; 3. Lancia Stratos HF
(France) Tour de Corse	6–7 November	1. (Italy) Sandro Munari (8h:23m:55s); 2. (France) Bernard Darniche (8h:24m:12s); 3. (France) Jean-Pierre Manzagol (8h:49m:14s)	1. Lancia Stratos HF; 2. Lancia Stratos HF; 3. Alpine-Renault A310
(United Kingdom) RAC Rally	27–30 November	1. (United Kingdom) Roger Clark (6h:02m:26s); 2. (Sweden) Stig Blomqvist (6h:07m:03s); 3. (Sweden) Björn Waldegård (6h:07m:55s)	1. Ford Escort RS1800; 2. Saab 99 EMS; 3. Ford Escort RS1800

== See also ==
- 1976 in sports
