= Sandro Munari =

Italian rally driver (1940–2026)

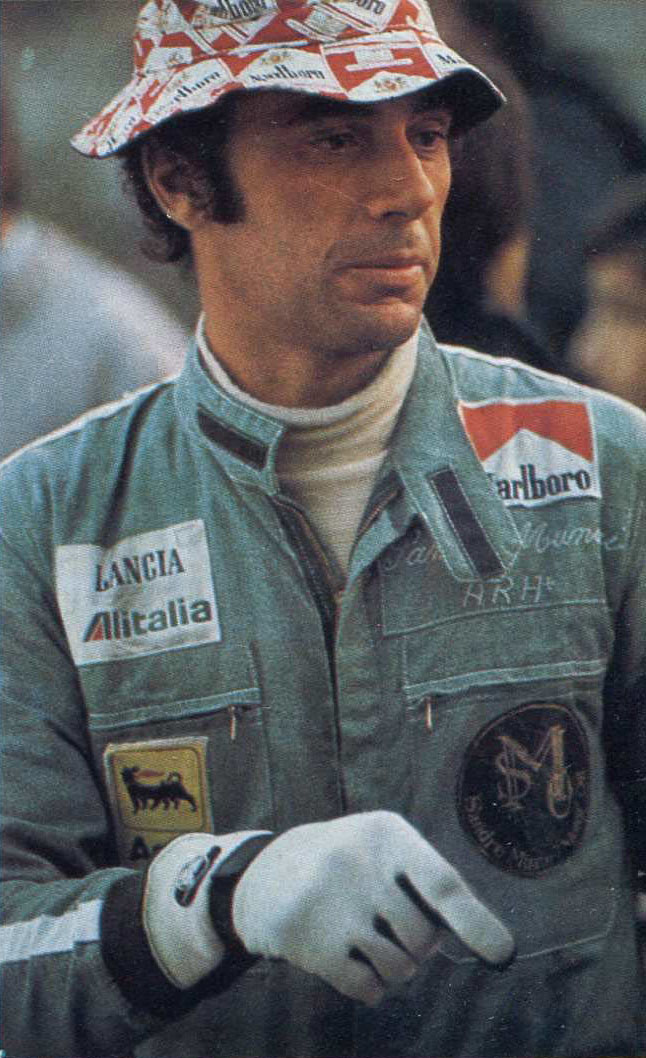
- Munari at the 1975 Rallye Sanremo

Personal information
- Nationality: (Italy) Italian
- Full name: Alessandro Munari
- Born: 27 March 1940; Cavarzere, Italy
- Died: 27 February 2026 (aged 85)

World Rally Championship record
- Years active: 1973–1984
- Co-driver: (Italy) Mario Mannucci (Kenya) Lofty Drews (Italy) Piero Sodano (Italy) Silvio Maiga (France) Jacques Jaubert (Kenya) Ian Street
- Teams: Lancia
- Rallies: 36
- Championships: 1 (1977)
- Rally wins: 7
- Podiums: 14
- Stage wins: 91
- Total points: 7
- First rally: 1973 Monte Carlo Rally
- First win: 1974 San Remo Rally
- Last win: 1977 Monte Carlo Rally
- Last rally: 1984 Safari Rally

Alessandro Munari (27 March 1940 – 27 February 2026), also nicknamed Il Drago, was an Italian motor racing and rally driver.

== Biography ==
Alessandro Munari was born in Cavarzere, in the Veneto region, on 27 March 1940. He began rallying in 1965 and won the Italian Rally Championship in 1967 and 1969, adding the European Rally Championship title in 1973 driving a Lancia Fulvia Coupé 1.6 HF. In 1972, he won the Targa Florio sports car endurance race, partnering Arturo Merzario in a works Ferrari 312PB. Also in 1972, Munari claimed his first major rally victory, winning the Monte Carlo Rally in a works Lancia Fulvia.

Munari was to become strongly associated with another of Lancia's rally icons – the Lancia Stratos HF. The partnership between the Italian car and the driver scooped a further Monte Carlo Rally hat-trick in the mid-1970s, among a total of seven World Rally Championship victories. Munari also won the 1977 FIA Cup for Rally Drivers title. Later in his career, he competed with a Fiat 131 Abarth, finishing third at the 1978 Tour de Corse and sixth at the 1980 Rallye Côte d'Ivoire. His last WRC appearances were at the Safari Rally, which he contested from 1981 to 1984, but retired each time.

Munari died on 27 February 2026, at the age of 85.

== Bibliography ==
- Sandro Munari and Cesare De Agostini, La coda del Drago, Edizioni Rombo, Bologna, 1981
- Sandro Munari and Sergio Remondino, Sandro Munari: Una vita di traverso, Giorgio Nada Editore, Milan, 2007

=== Complete IMC results ===
Year	Entrant	Car	1	2	3	4	5	6	7	8	9
1970	Lancia HF Squadra Corse	Lancia Fulvia 1.6 Coupé HF	MON; Ret	SWE; Ret	ITA; Ret	KEN; Ret	AUT	GRE; Ret	GBR; Ret		
1971	Lancia HF Squadra Corse	Lancia Fulvia 1.6 Coupé HF	MON; Ret	SWE	ITA; Ret	KEN; Ret	MAR	AUT	GRE	FRA	GBR; 9
1972	Lancia HF Squadra Corse	Lancia Fulvia 1.6 Coupé HF	MON; 1	SWE	KEN	MAR	GRE	AUT	ITA; Ret	USA	GBR

=== Complete WRC results ===
Year	Entrant	Car	1	2	3	4	5	6	7	8	9	10	11	12	13	WDC	Points
1973	Lancia Marlboro	Lancia Fulvia HF	MON; Ret	SWE	POR	KEN	MOR	GRE	POL	FIN	AUT	ITA	USA	GBR	FRA	N/A	N/A
1974	Lancia Marlboro	Lancia Fulvia HF	POR	KEN; 3	FIN											N/A	N/A
1974	Lancia Marlboro	Lancia Stratos HF				ITA; 1	CAN; 1	USA; Ret	GBR; 3	FRA; Ret						N/A	N/A
1975	Lancia Alitalia	Lancia Stratos HF	MON; 1	SWE	KEN; 2	GRE	MOR	POR	FIN	ITA; Ret	FRA; Ret	GBR; Ret				N/A	N/A
1976	Lancia Alitalia	Lancia Stratos HF	MON; 1	SWE	POR; 1	KEN; Ret	GRE	MOR; 3	FIN	ITA; 2	FRA; 1	GBR; 4				N/A	N/A
1977	Lancia Alitalia	Lancia Stratos HF	MON; 1	SWE	POR	KEN; 3	NZL	GRE	FIN	CAN	ITA; Ret	FRA; Ret	GBR; 25			1st	31
1978	Lancia Pirelli	Lancia Stratos HF	MON; Ret	SWE	KEN								GBR; Ret			NC	0
1978	Alitalia Fiat	Fiat 131 Abarth				POR; Ret	GRE; Ret	FIN	CAN	ITA; Ret	CIV	FRA; 3				NC	0
1979	Alitalia Fiat	Fiat 131 Abarth	MON	SWE	POR	KEN; 10	GRE	NZL	FIN	CAN	ITA	FRA	GBR	CIV		73rd	1
1980	Sandro Munari	Fiat 131 Abarth	MON	SWE	POR	KEN	GRE	ARG	FIN	NZL	ITA	FRA	GBR	CIV; 6		36th	6
1981	Sandro Munari	Dodge Ramcharger	MON	SWE	POR	KEN; Ret	FRA	GRE	ARG	BRA	FIN	ITA	CIV	GBR		NC	0
1982	Sandro Munari	Porsche 911 SC	MON	SWE	POR	KEN; Ret	FRA	GRE	NZL	BRA	FIN	ITA	CIV	GBR		NC	0
1983	Autodelta	Alfa Romeo GTV6	MON	SWE	POR	KEN; Ret	FRA	GRE	NZL	ARG	FIN	ITA	CIV	GBR		NC	0
1984	International Casino	Toyota Celica Twincam Turbo	MON	SWE	POR	KEN; Ret	FRA	GRE	NZL	ARG	FIN	ITA	CIV	GBR		NC	0

== WRC victories ==
#	Event	Season	Co-driver	Car
1	(Italy) 16º Rallye Sanremo	1974	Mario Mannucci	Lancia Stratos HF
2	(Canada) 3rd Rally Rideau Lakes	1974	Mario Mannucci	Lancia Stratos HF
3	(Monaco) 43ème Rallye Automobile de Monte-Carlo	1975	Mario Mannucci	Lancia Stratos HF
4	(Monaco) 44ème Rallye Automobile de Monte-Carlo	1976	Silvio Maiga	Lancia Stratos HF
5	10º Rallye de Portugal Vinho do Porto	1976	Silvio Maiga	Lancia Stratos HF
6	(France) 20ème Tour de Corse	1976	Silvio Maiga	Lancia Stratos HF
7	(Monaco) 45ème Rallye Automobile de Monte-Carlo	1977	Silvio Maiga	Lancia Stratos HF

Sporting positions
Preceded by Leo Cella	Italian Rally Champion; 1967	Succeeded by Arnaldo Cavallari
Preceded by Arnaldo Cavallari	Italian Rally Champion; 1969	Succeeded by Alcide Paganelli
Preceded by Raffaele Pinto	European Rally Champion; 1973	Succeeded by Walter Röhrl
Preceded by None	FIA Cup for Rally Drivers champion 1977	Succeeded by Markku Alén
Records
Preceded by Jean-Luc Thérier; 4 wins (1973–1984)	Most rally wins 7 wins, 5th at the 1976 Rallye de Portugal	Succeeded by Björn Waldegård; 11 wins, 8th at the 1979 Acropolis Rally
