= Tour de Corse =

Motorsporting event first held in 1956

- Status: Active
- Genre: Motorsporting event
- Frequency: Annual
- Location: Corsica
- Country: France
- Inaugurated: 1956

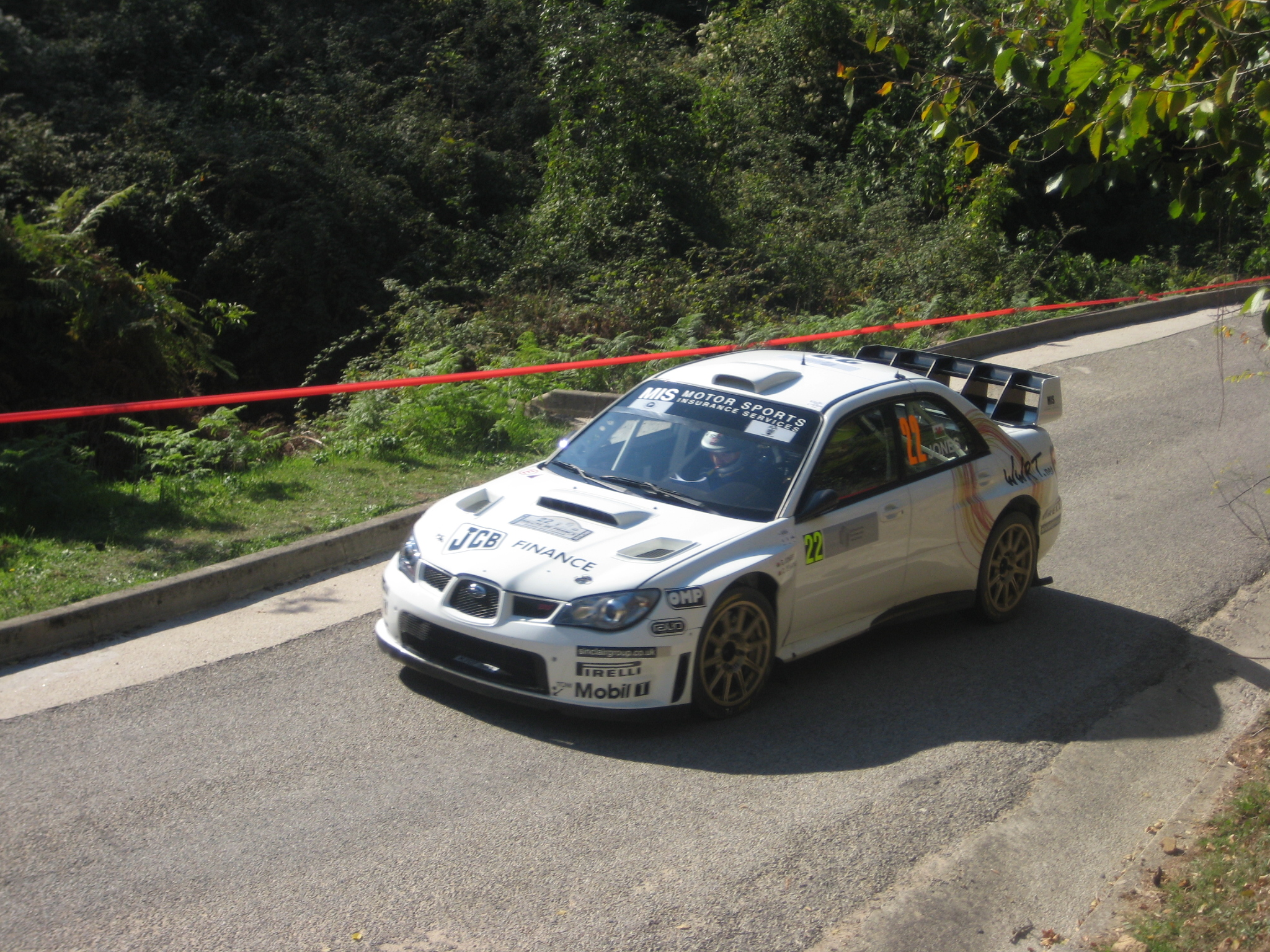
Gareth Jones driving a Subaru Impreza WRC at the 2008 rally.

The Tour de Corse is a rally first held in 1956 on the island of Corsica in France. It was the French round of the World Rally Championship from the inaugural 1973 season until 2008, was part of the Intercontinental Rally Challenge from 2011 to 2012, and finally returned to WRC in 2015. The name "Tour de Corse" refers to the fact that in the early days it was run around the island; nowadays it only features roads around Ajaccio. The rally is held on asphalt roads, and is known as the "Ten Thousand Turns Rally" because of the twisty mountain roads.

== History ==
The first running of the rally was won by the Belgian female driver Gilberte Thirion in a Renault Dauphine. While heavier cars struggled in the heavy snow and dangerous, Gilberte Thirion took advantage of her lighter car's oversteering characteristics and won the race. She is said to have commented on her triumph with this tongue-in-cheek statement: "The racing Dauphine: Oh! a fantastic car!: Nothing can stop it, and specially not even its brakes", a joke that would have a very long life.

Two drivers have won the event a record six times; Bernard Darniche (1970, 1975, 1977, 1978, 1979 and 1981) and Didier Auriol (1988, 1989, 1990, 1992, 1994, 1995). The only non-French drivers to win the event more than once are Sandro Munari, Markku Alén, Colin McRae and Thierry Neuville.

Several drivers have been killed during the event, including fatalities at 3 consecutive events. Attilio Bettega, driving a Lancia 037 Rally, died during the fourth special stage of the 1985 rally, Zérubia-Santa Giulia. On May 2, 1986, exactly a year later, Henri Toivonen and his co-driver Sergio Cresto died in their Lancia Delta S4 during the 18th stage of the event, Corte-Taverna. Almost a year later in 1987, co-driver French Corsican Jean-Michel Argenti and driver Jean Marchini fatally crashed similarly to those before them.

It has been largely popularized that Toivonen and Cresto's deaths sealed the fate of Group B rallying due to the realization that the cars had too much pure power and lack of containment, proving to be dangerous and potentially fatal to spectators.

The Tour de Corse Historique is a classic rally held since 2001.

== Winners ==
Season	Driver	Co-driver	Car	Series	Event report
1956	(Belgium) Gilberte Thirion	(Switzerland) Nadège Ferrier	Renault Dauphine	Non Championship	Report
1957	(France) Michel Nicol	(France) Roger de la Geneste	Alfa Romeo Giulietta	Non Championship	Report
1958	(France) Guy Monraisse	(France) Jacques Feret	Renault Dauphine	Non Championship	Report
1959	(France) Pierre Orsini	(France) Jean-Baptiste Canocini	Renault Dauphine	Non Championship	Report
1960	(West Germany) Herbert Linge	(West Germany) Paul-Ernst Strähle	Porsche SC 90	Non Championship	Report
1961	(France) René Trautmann	(France) Jean-Claude Ogier	Citroën DS19	Non Championship	Report
1962	(France) Pierre Orsini	(France) Jean-Baptiste Canocini	Renault Dauphine	Non Championship	Report
1963	(France) René Trautmann	(France) Jean-Claude Ogier	Citroën DS19	Non Championship	Report
1964	(France) Jean Vinatier	(France) Roger Masson	Renault 8 Gordini	Non Championship	Report
1965	(France) Pierre Orsini	(France) Jean-Baptiste Canocini	Renault 8 Gordini	Non Championship	Report
1966	(France) Jean-François Piot	(France) Jean-François Jacob	Renault 8 Gordini	Non Championship	Report
1967	(Italy) Sandro Munari	(Italy) Luciano Lombardini	Lancia Fulvia HF Coupé	Non Championship	Report
1968	(France) Jean-Claude Andruet	(France) Maurice Gelin	Alpine-Renault A110	Non Championship	Report
1969	(France) Gérard Larrousse	(France) Maurice Gelin	Porsche 911 R	Non Championship	Report
1970	(France) Bernard Darniche	(France) Bernard Demange	Alpine-Renault A110 1800	ERC	Report
1971	Rally cancelled				
1972	(France) Jean-Claude Andruet	(France) "Biche"	Alpine-Renault A110 1800	ERC	Report
1973	(France) Jean-Pierre Nicolas	(France) Michel Vial	Alpine-Renault A110 1800	WRC	Report
1974	(France) Jean-Claude Andruet	(France) "Biche"	Lancia Stratos HF	WRC	Report
1975	(France) Bernard Darniche	(France) Alain Mahé	Lancia Stratos HF	WRC	Report
1976	(Italy) Sandro Munari	(Italy) Silvio Maiga	Lancia Stratos HF	WRC	Report
1977	(France) Bernard Darniche	(France) Alain Mahé	Fiat 131 Abarth	WRC	Report
1978	(France) Bernard Darniche	(France) Alain Mahé	Fiat 131 Abarth	WRC	Report
1979	(France) Bernard Darniche	(France) Alain Mahé	Lancia Stratos HF	WRC	Report
1980	(France) Jean-Luc Thérier	(France) Michel Vial	Porsche 911 SC	WRC	Report
1981	(France) Bernard Darniche	(France) Alain Mahé	Lancia Stratos HF	WRC	Report
1982	(France) Jean Ragnotti	(France) Jean-Marc Andrié	Renault 5 Turbo	WRC	Report
1983	(Finland) Markku Alén	(Finland) Ilkka Kivimäki	Lancia 037 Rally	WRC	Report
1984	(Finland) Markku Alén	(Finland) Ilkka Kivimäki	Lancia 037 Rally	WRC	Report
1985	(France) Jean Ragnotti	(France) Pierre Thimonier	Renault R5 Maxi Turbo	WRC	Report
1986	(France) Bruno Saby	(France) Jean-François Fauchille	Peugeot 205 Turbo 16 E2	WRC	Report
1987	(France) Bernard Béguin	(France) Jean-Jacques Lenne	BMW M3	WRC	Report
1988	(France) Didier Auriol	(France) Bernard Occelli	Ford Sierra RS Cosworth	WRC	Report
1989	(France) Didier Auriol	(France) Bernard Occelli	Lancia Delta Integrale	WRC	Report
1990	(France) Didier Auriol	(France) Bernard Occelli	Lancia Delta Integrale 16V	WRC	Report
1991	(Spain) Carlos Sainz	(Spain) Luís Moya	Toyota Celica GT-Four ST165	WRC	Report
1992	(France) Didier Auriol	(France) Bernard Occelli	Lancia Delta HF Integrale	WRC	Report
1993	(France) François Delecour	(France) Daniel Grataloup	Ford Escort RS Cosworth	WRC	Report
1994	(France) Didier Auriol	(France) Bernard Occelli	Toyota Celica Turbo 4WD ST185	WRC	Report
1995	(France) Didier Auriol	(France) Denis Giraudet	Toyota Celica GT-Four ST205	WRC	Report
1996	(France) Philippe Bugalski	(France) Jean-Paul Chiaroni	Renault Mégane Maxi	2-Litre World Rally Cup	Report
1997	(United Kingdom) Colin McRae	(United Kingdom) Nicky Grist	Subaru Impreza WRC 97	WRC	Report
1998	(United Kingdom) Colin McRae	(United Kingdom) Nicky Grist	Subaru Impreza WRC 98	WRC	Report
1999	(France) Philippe Bugalski	(France) Jean-Paul Chiaroni	Citroën Xsara Kit Car	WRC	Report
2000	(France) Gilles Panizzi	(France) Hervé Panizzi	Peugeot 206 WRC	WRC	Report
2001	(Spain) Jesús Puras	(Spain) Marc Martí	Citroën Xsara WRC	WRC	Report
2002	(France) Gilles Panizzi	(France) Hervé Panizzi	Peugeot 206 WRC	WRC	Report
2003	(Norway) Petter Solberg	(United Kingdom) Phil Mills	Subaru Impreza WRC2003	WRC	Report
2004	(Estonia) Markko Märtin	(United Kingdom) Michael Park	Ford Focus RS WRC 04	WRC	Report
2005	(France) Sébastien Loeb	(Monaco) Daniel Elena	Citroën Xsara WRC	WRC	Report
2006	(France) Sébastien Loeb	(Monaco) Daniel Elena	Citroën Xsara WRC	WRC	Report
2007	(France) Sébastien Loeb	(Monaco) Daniel Elena	Citroën C4 WRC	WRC	Report
2008	(France) Sébastien Loeb	(Monaco) Daniel Elena	Citroën C4 WRC	WRC	Report
2009	(France) Pascal Trojani	(France) Francis Mazotti	Peugeot 307 WRC	France Cup	Report
2010	Rally cancelled				
2011	(Belgium) Thierry Neuville	(Belgium) Nicolas Gilsoul	Peugeot 207 S2000	IRC	Report
2012	(Spain) Dani Sordo	(Spain) Carlos del Barrio	Mini Cooper S2000	IRC	Report
2013	(France) Bryan Bouffier	(France) Xavier Panseri	Peugeot 207 S2000	ERC	Report
2014	(France) Stéphane Sarrazin	(France) Jacques-Julien Renucci	Ford Fiesta RRC	ERC	Report
2015	(Finland) Jari-Matti Latvala	(Finland) Miikka Anttila	Volkswagen Polo R WRC	WRC	Report
2016	(France) Sébastien Ogier	(France) Julien Ingrassia	Volkswagen Polo R WRC	WRC	Report
2017	(Belgium) Thierry Neuville	(Belgium) Nicolas Gilsoul	Hyundai i20 Coupe WRC	WRC	Report
2018	(France) Sébastien Ogier	(France) Julien Ingrassia	Ford Fiesta WRC	WRC	Report
2019	(Belgium) Thierry Neuville	(Belgium) Nicolas Gilsoul	Hyundai i20 Coupe WRC	WRC	Report
2020	Rally not held				

=== Multiple winners ===
Wins	Driver	Years won
6	(France) Bernard Darniche	1970, 1975, 1977–1979, 1981
6	(France) Didier Auriol	1988–1990, 1992, 1994–1995
4	(France) Sébastien Loeb	2005–2008
3	(France) Pierre Orsini	1959, 1962, 1969
3	(France) Jean-Claude Andruet	1968, 1972, 1974
3	(Belgium) Thierry Neuville	2011, 2017, 2019
2	(France) René Trautmann	1961, 1963
2	(Italy) Sandro Munari	1967, 1976
2	(France) Jean Ragnotti	1982, 1985
2	(Finland) Markku Alén	1983–1984
2	(France) Philippe Bugalski	1996, 1999
2	(United Kingdom) Colin McRae	1997–1998
2	(France) Gilles Panizzi	2000, 2002
2	(France) Sébastien Ogier	2016, 2018
