= Guy Monraisse =

French racing driver

Guy Monraisse (19 March 1932 – 15 May 2017) was a French racing driver who won the 1958 Monte Carlo Rally with Jacques Feret in a modified Renault Dauphine fitted with a 5 speed gearbox. This was the first victory on the event for a car with the engine located over the driven wheels. Later that same year, Monraisse and Feret drove their Dauphine to victory in the Tour de Corse. He was born in Aurillac.
