= 1976 Monte Carlo Rally =

Rallying motorsport event

1976 Monte Carlo Rally 44ème Rallye Automobile de Monte-Carlo
Round 1 of the 1976 World Rally Championship
Next event →
- Host country: Monaco
- Dates run: 17 – 24 January 1976
- Stages: 23 (530.5 km; 329.6 miles)
- Stage surface: Mixed: Tarmac, Snow

Statistics
- Crews: 148 at start, 48 (84 classified) at finish

Overall results
- Overall winner: (Italy) Sandro Munari; Lancia Stratos HF

The 1976 Monte Carlo Rally was the 44th Rallye Automobile de Monte-Carlo. It was won by Sandro Munari in a Lancia Stratos, with two more Stratoses finishing second and third.

== Background ==
The Monte Carlo Rally is traditionally the first one on the World Rally Championship calendar, not far behind the RAC Rally which closes out the season. Ten rallies were scheduled in 1976. Lancia, who entered three Stratos (along with Bernard Darniche's private entry) were the favorites, along with Fiat who were still depending on the 124 Abarth as the new 131 was not yet ready. After a notable lack of success with the A310, Alpine-Renault's new Competition Director Gérard Larrousse opted to not enter the 1976 Monte Carlo Rally prior to merging Alpine and Gordini into Renault Sport at the end of the year, much to the dismay of local fans. The company still provided unofficial support for seven entries by the works drivers (six of them A310s and one A110) and numerous privateers also joined. Opel sent three four-valve, Group 4 Kadett GT/E and Ford sent two Escorts. Polski-Fiat sent three of their new, 1756 cc-engined 125p's (although the car was not yet officially homologated at the start of the rally) and SEAT made their first factory entry in a rally outside of Spain with two 1.8-litre 1430 Especials.

In the 1970s, all World Rally Championship entries were Production Cars (Category A). Production minimums had to be reached within 12 months, although for Group 4 manufacturers had 24 months to reach the required number. For 1976, the Group 4 minimum was lowered from 500 to 400 cars.

- Group 1: Series-production touring cars with a minimum production of 5,000; replaced by Group N in 1982.
- Group 2: Touring cars with a minimum production of 1,000; replaced by Group A in 1982.
- Group 3: GT cars with a minimum production of 1,000.
- Group 4: GT cars with a minimum production of 400 in 24 months; replaced by Group B in 1982.

== Format ==
As was traditional for the Monte Carlo Rally until 1997, teams were given the choice of several cities as starting points. This year's race was broken up in four major sections:

- Parcours de concentration ("Concentration Stage")

Teams were given a choice of nine cities to start from, but Lisbon and Thessaloniki were dropped, leaving seven cities. Paris was the most popular, with 76 cars choosing it as the departure point, while only four cars started from London. Fog in France and snow in Italy meant that a number of the teams from Paris and Rome did not reach the second stage.

- Parcours de classement ("Ranking Stage")

135 teams reached Monaco on Monday, 19 January, heading to San Remo for two special stages. With mostly dry roads, the powerful Lancia Stratos had an advantage, as did those drivers who had opted for "Racing" tyres. To minimize the factory teams' financial advantage, all crews were forced to choose their tyre type before starting the Ranking Stage and stick with that tyre to the end of the race - a risky decision at Monte Carlo, with very varied and unpredictable weather. Jean-Claude Andruet on the Alpine A310 took second in spite of using snow tyres, followed by the Stratoses of Björn Waldegård and Raffaele Pinto.

- Parcours commun ("Common Stage")

The main part of the event, the Common Stage took two days and stretched for 1,800 kilometres (1,118 mi), including road sections and special stages. The weather started out dry, with minimal icy patches, but soon rain and eventually snow set in. Munari briefly lost the lead to Andruet after having selected the wrong tyre but was soon back in first again. At the end of this section, Stratoses held the first three places: Munari in the lead, followed by Waldegård and Bernard Darniche.
Heavy snow at the end of the final stage pushed some late starters out of the rally, while the entire Polski-Fiat team was disqualified as their 1756 cc-engined 125p's had not yet received their homologation. All 84 teams that completed this stage were classified at the end of the rally, even if they did not complete the final, night stage.

- Parcours complémentaire ("Additional Stage")

Sixty of the 84 teams which completed the Common Stage started the final, night time stage. The weather was dry, once again favoring the more powerful cars and those who had selected Racing tyres at the beginning of the rally. The Alpine-Renault crews had bad luck, dropping out one by one, and by the end of the fourth final stage (SS18) none of the semi-official entries were still in the race. Munari seemed secure in his position, until at the penultimate stage, he finished with his gearbox stuck in third. The Lancia mechanics managed to drain the gearbox, free the gears, and reassemble the gearbox in precisely ten minutes to make the start of the final stage with no penalty. Munari achieved a record time on the final stage and Lancia occupied the three medal places, ahead of Walter Röhrl in his much less powerful Kadett GT/E.

== Results ==
Final standings:

Pos.	Driver	Co-driver	Car	Group	Starting no./ Registration	Time	Difference	Mfr. Points	Place of departure
1976 Rallye Automobile Monte-Carlo results
1.	(Italy) Sandro Munari	(Italy) Silvio Maiga	Lancia Stratos HF	4	10 / TO M54374	6:25:10	0.0	20	Rome
2.	(Sweden) Björn Waldegård	(Sweden) Hans Thorszelius	Lancia Stratos HF	4	6 / TO N12661	6:26:37	1:27		Rome
3.	(France) Bernard Darniche	(France) Alain Mahé	Lancia Stratos HF	4	12 / TO N14329	6:31:23	6:13		Rome
4.	(Germany) Walter Röhrl	(Germany) Jochen Berger	Opel Kadett GT/E 16V	4	16 / GG-DU 403	6:34:32	9:22	10	Copenhagen
5.	(United Kingdom) Roger Clark	(United Kingdom) Jim Porter	Ford Escort RS 1800 MkII	4	11 / KHK 983N	6:37:07	11:57	8	London
6.	(Finland) Markku Alén	(Finland) Ilkka Kivimäki	Fiat 124 Abarth Rallye	4	7 / TO M46459	6:42:31	17:21	6	Rome
7.	(France) Guy Fréquelin	(France) Jacques Delaval	Porsche 911 Carrera	3	23 / 2444 DK 93	6:44:19	19:09	4	Paris
8.	(Italy) Roberto Cambiaghi	(Italy) Bruno Scabini	Fiat 124 Abarth Rallye	4	5 / TO M46460	7:05:27	40:17		Rome
9.	(Luxembourg) Nicolas Koob	(Luxembourg) Nico Demuth	Porsche 911 Carrera RS 3.0	4	33 / 865	7:07:19	42:09		Frankfurt
10.	(France) Bernard Béguin	(France) Jean-François Fauchille	Alfa Romeo 2000 GTV	1	45 / 9578 QG 64	7:13:47	48:37	1	Paris
11.	(France) Michèle Mouton	(France) Françoise Conconi	Alpine-Renault A110 1600 SC	3	19 / 1453 SM 06	7:14:25	49:15		Paris
12.	(Spain) António Zanini	(Spain) Juan José Petisco	SEAT 1430/1800	4	27 / B-4597-AH	7:21:46	56:36		Almería
13.	(France) Christian Dorche	(France) Bernard Richaud	BMW 2002 Ti	1	54 / 13 DU 05	7:29:17	1:04:07		Paris
14.	(France) Christian Gardavot	(France) Jacqueline Roger	Porsche 911 Carrera	3	49 / 7700 SN 06	7:30:28	1:05:18		Rome
15.	(Italy) Maurizio Verini	(Italy) Francesco Rossetti	Fiat 124 Abarth Rallye	4	2 / TO M46458	7:32:02	1:06:52		Rome
16.	(Luxembourg) Aly Kridel Sr.	(Luxembourg) Leon Linden	Ford Escort RS 2000 (Mk I)	1	67 / 9636	7:32:15	2:49:18		Warsaw
17.	(Italy) Agustino Turnani ("Tchine")	(France) Jean-Claude Salles	Opel Commodore GS/E	1	70 / 1461	7:32:21	1:07:11		Rome
18.	(France) Jean-Paul Barin	(France) Jean-Pierre Barin	Alfa Romeo 2000 GTV	1	149 / 419 TW 38	7:36:43	1:11:33		Paris
19.	(Germany) Friedrich von der Leyen	(Germany) Peter Diekmann	Alpine-Renault A110 1800	3	55 / MO-VN 35	7:43:27	1:18:17		Copenhagen
20.	(France) Raymond Chianéa	(France) Jean Chianéa	Opel Ascona A	2	110 / 9869 SE 06	7:44:39	1:19:29		Paris
21.	(France) Christian Nahon	(France) Jean Louis Afric	Renault 12 Gordini	2	135 /	7:46:02	1:20:52		Paris
22.	(France) Jean-Pierre Malcher	(France) Pierre Pagani	Autobianchi A112 Abarth	1	50 / 5006 DG 93	7:48:19	1:23:09		Paris
23.	(France) Christine Dacremont	(France) Delphine Denard	Autobianchi A112 Abarth	1	61 / 5004 DG 93	7:48:19	1:23:09		Paris
24.	(Italy) Giorgio Pianta	(Italy) Roberto Colucci	Autobianchi A112 Abarth	1	71 / TO N11455	7:48:33	1:23:23		Rome
25.	(France) Marianne Hoepfner	(France) Michèle Espinos-Petit ("Biche")	Autobianchi A112 Abarth	1	58 / 5001 DG 93	7:50:25	1:25:15		Paris
26.	(France) Leo Garin	(France) Giorgio Rossi	Lancia Fulvia 1.6 Coupé HF	4	29 / AO 74282	7:50:42	1:25:32		Rome
27.	(France) Alain Coppier	(France) Jacques Hénuset	Audi 80 S	1	42 / 671 KZ 73	7:51:47	1:26:37		Paris
28.	(Norway) Tore Bratlie	(Norway) Monty Karlan	Simca Rallye 2	1	78 / DC 4169	7:54:26	1:29:16		Copenhagen
29.	(Italy) Maurizio Ambrogetti	(Italy) Paolo Roasenda	Autobianchi A112 Abarth	1	59 / MI X15680	7:55:02	1:29:52		Rome
30.	(Spain) Benigno "Beny" Fernández	(Spain) Rafael Cid ("Cid")	BMW 2002 Tii	1	125 / PO 0100 C	7:56:00	1:30:50		Almería
31.	(Italy) Giorgio Schön	(Italy) Emilio Baj Macario	Autobianchi A112 Abarth	1	118 / FI 32482	7:58:22	1:33:12		Rome
32.	(France) Roger Vallet	(France) Michele Vallet	Alpine-Renault A110 1600 S	3	140 / 3838 QY 25	8:00:46	1:35:36		Paris
33.	(France) Dominique Gerard	(France) Jean-Jacques Vanoutryve ("Nuche")	Simca Rallye 2	1	106 /	8:01:42	1:36:32		Paris
34.	(Germany) Peter Rumpfkeil	(Germany) Horst Buchholz	Porsche 911 Carrera	4	150 / DH-X 8	8:03:44	1:38:34		Paris
35.	(Germany) Joachim Springer	(Germany) Hans-Christoph Mehmel	Volkswagen Golf Mk1	1	74 / H-PE 231	8:06:53	1:41:43		Copenhagen
36.	(France) Claude Laurent	(France) Jacques Marché	Autobianchi A112 Abarth	1	47 / 5633 UA 38	8:07:16	1:42:06		Paris
37.	(France) Gérard Guillaume	(France) Gérard Biocchini	Simca Rallye 2	1	165 / 9881 SH 06	8:13:01	1:47:51		Rome
38.	(France) François Perret	(France) Willy Bregnard	Opel Ascona A	4	87 /	8:14:36	1:49:26		Paris
39.	(France) Henri Trautmann	(France) Daniel Monchal	Fiat 128 3P		160 / 7941 TZ 38	8:16:12	1:51:02		Paris
40.	(France) Bernard Pons	(France) Pierre Toujan	Autobianchi A112 Abarth	1	72 / 909 UA 38	8:18:36	1:53:26		Paris
41.	(Andorra) Ramón Surribas-Garcia	(Andorra) Amédée Rottier Castello	Simca Rallye 2	2	37 /	8:20:30	1:55:20		Paris
42.	(France) Corinne Koppenhague-Tarnaud	(France) Marie-Dominique Cousin ("Marido")	Autobianchi A112 Abarth	1	62 / 5005 DG 93	8:21:05	1:55:55		Paris
43.	(Denmark) Jens Winther	(Denmark) Ebbe Lous	BMW 320i (E21)		153 /	8:22:44	1:57:34		Copenhagen
44.	(Switzerland) Philippe Schaer	(Switzerland) Pierre-Michel Fiorina	Renault 17 Gordini	1	123 /	8:23:25	1:58:15		Paris
45.	(France) Bernard Decure	(France) Jean-Michel Lefevre	Alpine-Renault A110		142 /	8:24:23	1:59:13		Paris
46.	(France) Didier Sutton	(France) Patrice Le Bonner	Peugeot 504 Ti	1	88 / 9447 CZ 93	8:48:22	2:23:12		Paris
47.	(Germany) Jutta Fellbaum	(Germany) Hermann Schäfer	Volkswagen Golf Mk1	1	96 /	8:49:04	2:23:54		Frankfurt
48.	(Denmark) Hans-Michael Jelsdorf	(Denmark) Jorgen Rasmussen	Volkswagen Golf Mk1	1	113 /	8:55:25	2:30:15		Copenhagen
Retired after Parcours commun (Common Stage); still classified
49.	(France) Jean-Pierre Nicolas	(France) Vincent Laverne	Alpine-Renault A310	4	4 / 6722 JB 76	::	Differential		Paris
50.	(France) Jean Ragnotti	(France) Jean-Marc Andrié	Alpine-Renault A110 1800	4	31 / 1475 JB 76		Engine		Paris
51.	(France) Bruno Saby	(France) Jean-Christian Court-Payen	Autobianchi A112 Abarth	4	53 / 6332 UA 38		Transmission		Paris
52.	(Luxembourg) Nobert Huberty	(Luxembourg) Jos Brandenburger	Fiat 128 3P	1	46 / N 4000				Paris
53.	(France) Raymond Richard	(France) Claudin Vigneau	Alfa Romeo 2000 GTV	1	138 /				Rome
54.	(Switzerland) Claudio Mosconi	(Italy) Angelo Torriani	Autobianchi A112 Abarth	1	143 /				Rome
55.	(France) Bernard Donguès	(France) Marika	Fiat 127	1	147 / 468 RU 91				Paris
56.	(France) Claude Handjian	(France) Michel Richtarch	Simca Rallye 2	1	115 /				Paris
57.	(France) Christian Boeri	(Monaco) Jean Clugnac	Simca Rallye 2	1	76 / 7697 SM 08	::	::		Rome
58.	(France) Francis Orlandini	(France) Jean-Claude Dechambenoy	BMW 2002 Tii	1	154 /	::	::		Paris
59.	(Germany) Reiner Altenheimer	(Germany) Gerd Blankenhagen	Porsche 911 Carrera RS	3	48 / LM-X 911	::	::		Frankfurt
60.	(Germany) Wilhelm Lyding	(Germany) Otto Karl Klemenz	Opel Commodore GS/E	1	104 / M-DE 133	::	::		Frankfurt
61.	(France) Jean Pallanca	(France) Christian Audibert	Simca Rallye 2	2	108 /	::	::		Rome
62.	(France) Marie-Odile Desvignes	(France) J. Perrin	Autobianchi A112 Abarth	1	57 / 5003 DG 93	::	::		Paris
63.	(France) Alain Weiser	(France) Jacques Michallet	DAF 66	1	134 /	::	::		Paris
64.	(Italy) Giubar	(Italy) Alam	Volkswagen Golf GTi	2	161 / MS 100600				Rome
65.	(Italy) Renato Bonora	(Italy) Riccardo Renna	Opel Ascona 1.9 SR	1	156 / CN 290762				Rome
66.	(France) Margo	(France) René Colleon	Simca Rallye 2	1	163 /				Paris
67.	(France) Jean Konig	(France) Christiane Apparcel	Simca 1100	2	158 /				Paris
68.	(Germany) Hans Schüller	(Germany) Jochi Kleint	Nissan	1	83 /				Frankfurt
69.	(France) Gilbert Lunardon	(France) Patrice Cravero	Renault 17 Gordini	2	39 /				Almería
70.	(Monaco) Joseph Cirillo	(Monaco) Raphaël Cirillo	Alfa Romeo 2000 GT Veloce	1	112 / E911				Rome
71.	(Monaco) René Ambrosini	(Monaco) Roger Ambrosini	Alfa Romeo Alfetta GTV	1	99 /				Rome
72.	(Spain) Salvador Cañellas Gual	(Spain) Daniel Ferrater	SEAT 1430/1800	4	36 / B 5607 Z		Accident		Almería
73.	(Germany) Wolf-Dieter Giese	(Germany) Peter Kleffel	Opel Ascona A	1	157 /				Copenhagen
74.	(France) Gérard Swaton	(France) Bernard Cordesse	Alpine-Renault A110 1600 S	3	103 /	::	::		Paris
75.	(France) Jean-Pierre Turco	(France) Noël Herben	Opel Ascona A	2	32 /	::	::		Paris
76.	(France) Alain Grandsard	(France) Francis Lamarque	Ford Escort RS	1	93 /	::	::		Paris
77.	(Sweden) Emil Gernandt	(Sweden) Fergus Sager	Opel Ascona A	2	25 / CPZ 343	::	::		Warsaw
78.	(France) Albert Braida	(France) Alain Boniface	Simca Rallye 2	2	144 /	::	::		Paris
79.	(Germany) Heinz Gellert	(Germany) Karl-Heinz Hufstadt	Toyota Celica	1	89 /	::	::		Frankfurt
80.	(Monaco) Michel Peyret	(Monaco) Cornelli Jean-Jacques	Citroën Dyane 6	1	102 / 9584	::	::		Paris
81.	(France) Christian Gillet	(France) Jean Moutel	Opel Commodore GS/E	1	137 /	::	::		Almería
82.	(Italy) Antonio Bemelli	(Italy) Fabio Orzali	Opel Ascona A	2	167 /	::	::		Rome
83.	(Germany) Peter Feustel	(Germany) Gunter Schmidt	Opel Ascona 1.6 SR	2	129 /	::	::		Copenhagen
84.	(France) Marie-Claude Charmasson ("Beaumont")	(France) Christine Giganot	Alpine-Renault A310	4	15 / 6721 JB 76	::	::		Paris
