= Lancia Stratos =

Rally racing sports car (1973–1978)

Lancia Stratos HF
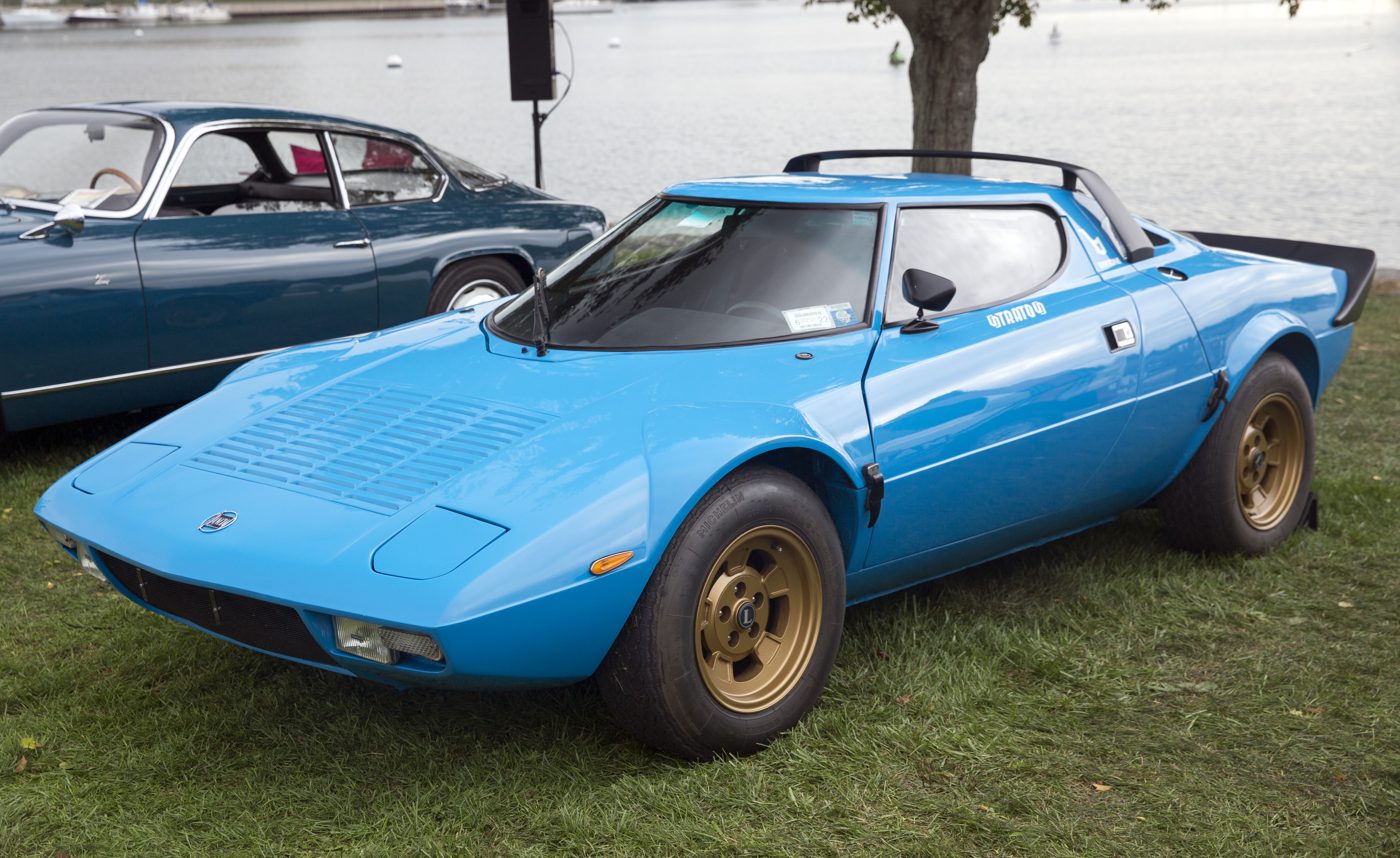
- Lancia Stratos HF Stradale (road version)

Overview
- Manufacturer: Lancia
- Production: 1973–1978 ca. 492 produced
- Assembly: Italy: Turin
- Designer: Marcello Gandini at Bertone

Body and chassis
- Class: Sports car Rally car
- Body style: 2-door coupé
- Layout: Transverse mid-engine, rear-wheel drive
- Chassis: Steel space-frame structure with integral roll-cage. Fiberglass body

Powertrain
- Engine: Lancia 2,418 cc (148 cu in) Tipo 829A.000 V6 24v
- Power output: Stradale: 190 hp (140 kW)
- Transmission: 5-speed manual

Dimensions
- Wheelbase: 2,180 mm (85.8 in)
- Length: 3,710 mm (146.1 in)
- Width: 1,750 mm (68.9 in)
- Height: 1,110 mm (43.7 in)
- Curb weight: Stradale: 980 kg (2,161 lb); Group 4: 880 kg (1,940 lb)

Chronology
- Predecessor: Lancia Fulvia HF
- Successor: Lancia Rally 037

The Lancia Stratos HF (Tipo 829), known as Lancia Stratos, is a rear mid-engined sports car designed for rallying, made by Italian car manufacturer Lancia. It was highly successful in competition, winning the World Rally Championship in 1974, 1975 and 1976; as well as winning the 1974 Targa Florio, winning the Tour de France Automobile five times and the Giro d'Italia automobilistico three times.

== History ==
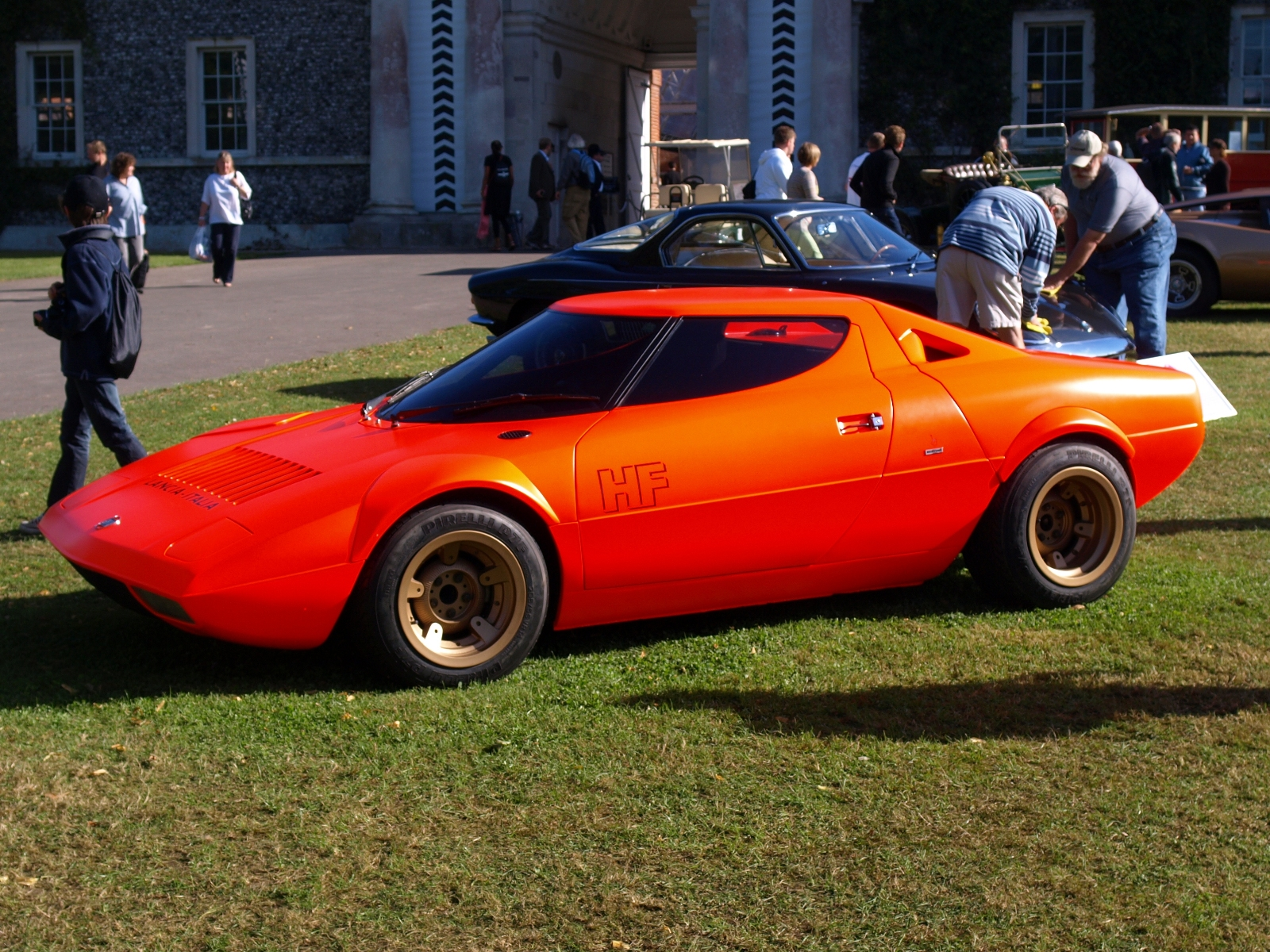
Lancia Stratos HF Prototype

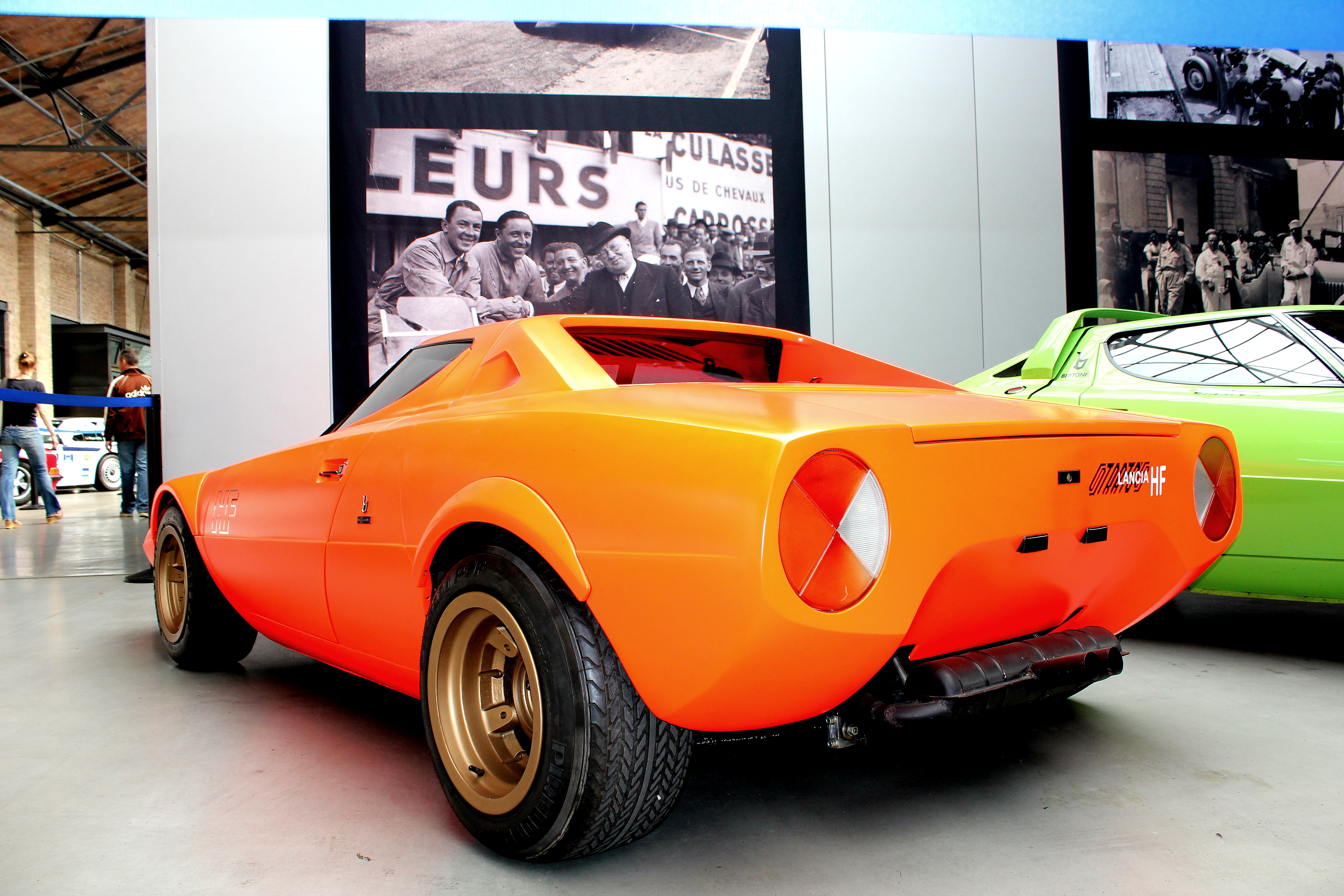
Lancia Stratos HF Prototype rear

Lancia had traditionally worked with the design house Pininfarina and had not used Bertone before. Bertone desired to create an opportunity for a relationship with Lancia and knew that Lancia was looking for a replacement for the aging Fulvia for use in rally sports. Bertone decided to design an eye-catching model to show to Lancia. Bertone used the running gear of a Fulvia Coupé which belonged to one of his friends and built a running model around it. When Bertone personally appeared at the Lancia factory gates with the Stratos Zero, he passed underneath the barrier to great applause from the Lancia workers. After that Lancia and Bertone agreed to develop a new rally car based on the ideas of Bertone's designer Marcello Gandini. Gandini had already designed the Lamborghini Miura and was working on the Countach at the time.

Lancia presented the Bertone-designed Lancia Stratos HF prototype at the 1971 Turin Motor Show, a year after the announcement of the Stratos Zero concept car. The prototype Stratos HF (Chassis 1240) was fluorescent red in colour and featured a distinctive crescent-shaped wrap-around windshield providing maximum forward visibility with almost no rear visibility. The prototype had three different engines in its early development life: the Lancia Fulvia engine, the Lancia Beta engine and finally, for the 1971 public launch, the mid-mounted Dino Ferrari V6 producing 190 hp (142 kW) in road trim. The use of this engine had been planned from the beginning of the project, but Enzo Ferrari was reluctant to sign off the use of this engine in a car he saw as a competitor to his own Dino V6. After the production of the Dino had ended, the "Commendatore" (a popular nickname for Enzo Ferrari) agreed to deliver the engines for the Stratos, upon which Lancia suddenly received 500 units.

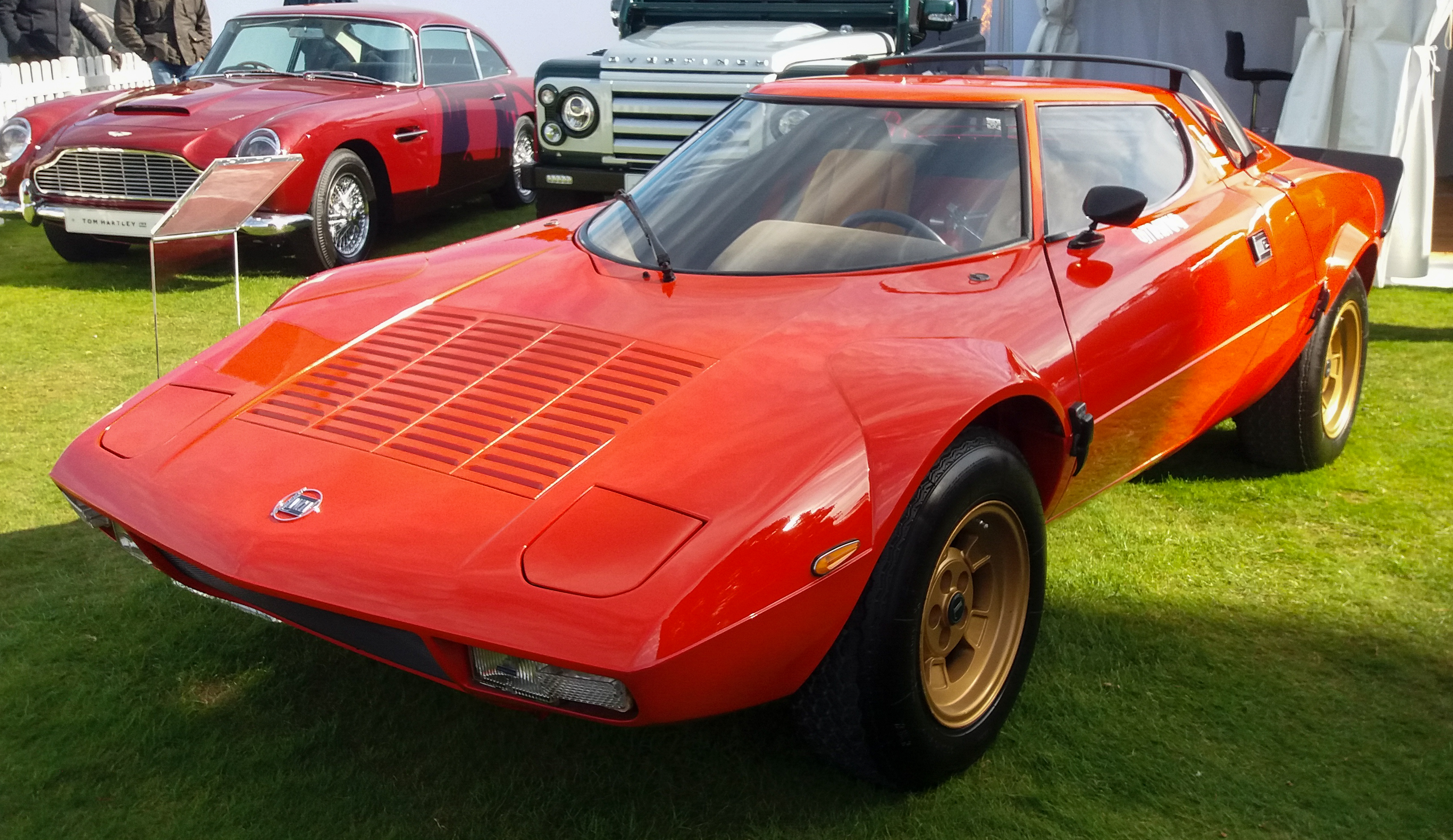
1974 Stratos HF Stradale 2.4

The final design shares several striking features with Gandini's Lamborghini Miura: the dual clamshell hoods (the front opening forward, over the spare wheel placed identically, and the rear hinging rearward, with stepped black louvres above the engine and integrating a trunk behind it) – as well as the way the door-glass bottom rears curve upward, giving the otherwise frameless doors an upward-swept frame section. In contrast though, the Stratos' body received an unmistakable short and wide wedge shape, so extreme that the nose drops below the top crests of the front wheel wells, and made unique by the semi-elliptical greenhouse's windshield and door glass ensemble, when seen from above.

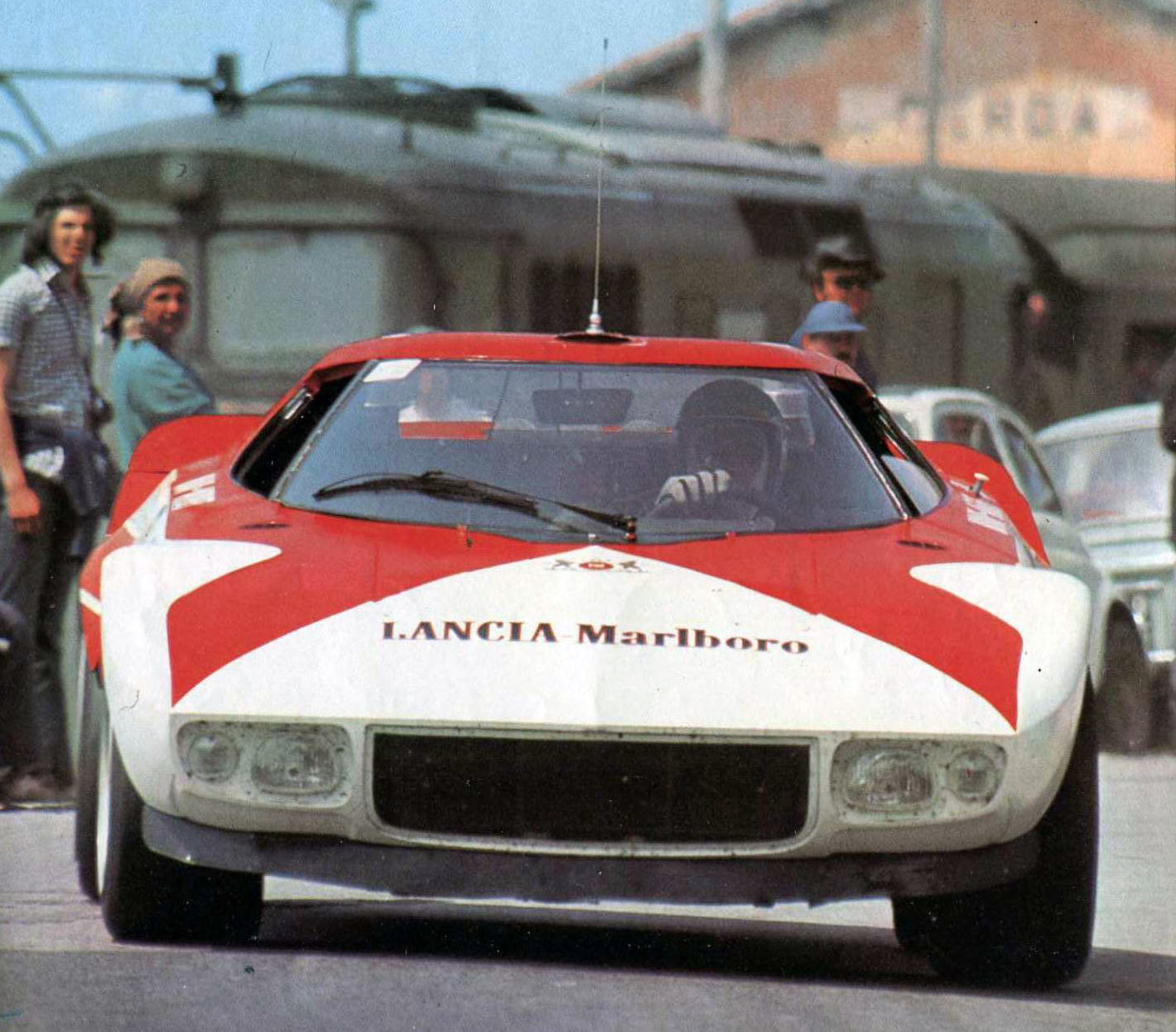
Lancia Stratos HF 2.4 V6 24V Prototype at 1973 Targa Florio

The Stratos was a successful rally car during the 1970s and early 1980s. It started a new era in rallying as it was the first car designed from scratch for this kind of competition. The three leading men behind the entire rallying project were Lancia team manager Cesare Fiorio, British racer/engineer Mike Parkes and factory rally driver Sandro Munari, with Bertone's Designer Marcello Gandini taking a personal interest in designing and producing the bodywork. A dedicated calculations engineer from Lancia was tasked with performing calculations on many of the chassis, steering, suspension and engine components: Nicola Materazzi.

Lancia undertook extensive testing with the Stratos and raced the car in several racing events where Group 5 prototypes were allowed during the 1972 and 1973 seasons. Production of the 500 cars required for homologation in Group 4 commenced in 1973 and the Stratos was homologated for the 1974 World Rally Championship season. The Ferrari Dino V6 engine was phased out in 1974, but 500 engines — among the last examples built — were delivered to Lancia. Production ended in 1975, when it was thought that only 492 were made (for the 1976 season, the Group 4 production requirement was reduced to 400 in 24 months). The manufacturer of the car was Bertone in Turin, with final assembly by Lancia at the Chivasso plant. Powered by the Dino 2.4 L V6 engine that was also fitted to the rallying versions, but in a lower state of tune, it resulted in a power output of 190 PS; 188 bhp (140 kW) at 7,000 rpm and 226 N⋅m; 166 lbf⋅ft (23 kg⋅m) at 4,000 rpm of torque, giving the road car a 0–100 km/h (62 mph) time of 6.8 seconds, and a top speed of 232 km/h (144 mph) initially fitting 205/70VR14 Pirelli Cinturato CN36, later 15" wheels with a mixture of lultra low profile Pirelli Cinturato Cinturato P7. The car was sold as the Lancia Stratos HF Stradale.

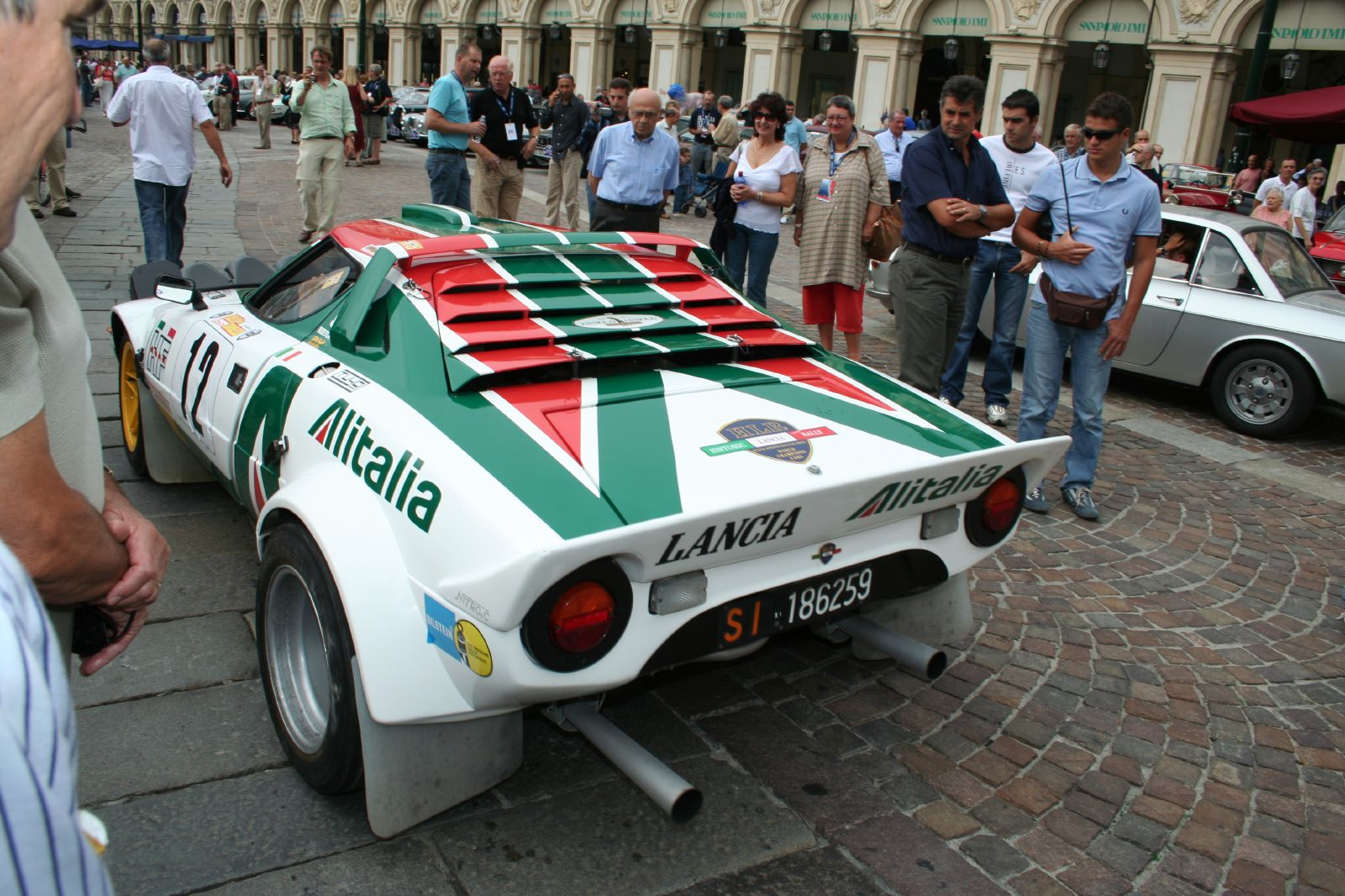
Lancia Stratos HF at the Lancia centenary celebrations in Turin in 2006

The Stratos weighed between 900 and 950 kilograms, depending on configuration. Power output was around 275 hp (205 kW) for the original 12 valve version and 320 hp (239 kW) for the 24 valve version. Beginning with the 1978 season the 24 valve heads were banned from group 4 competition by a change to the FIA rules (which would have required additional production of 24-valve cars for re-homologation). Even with this perceived power deficit the Stratos was the car to beat in competition and when it did not suffer an accident or premature transmission failure (of the latter there were many) it had great chances to win.

The car won the 1974, 1975 and 1976 championship titles in the hands of Sandro Munari and Björn Waldegård, and might have gone on to win more had not internal politics within the Fiat group placed rallying responsibility on the Fiat 131 Abarths. As well as victories on the 1975, 1976 and 1977 Monte Carlo Rally, all courtesy of Munari, the Stratos won the event with the private Chardonnet Team as late as 1979.

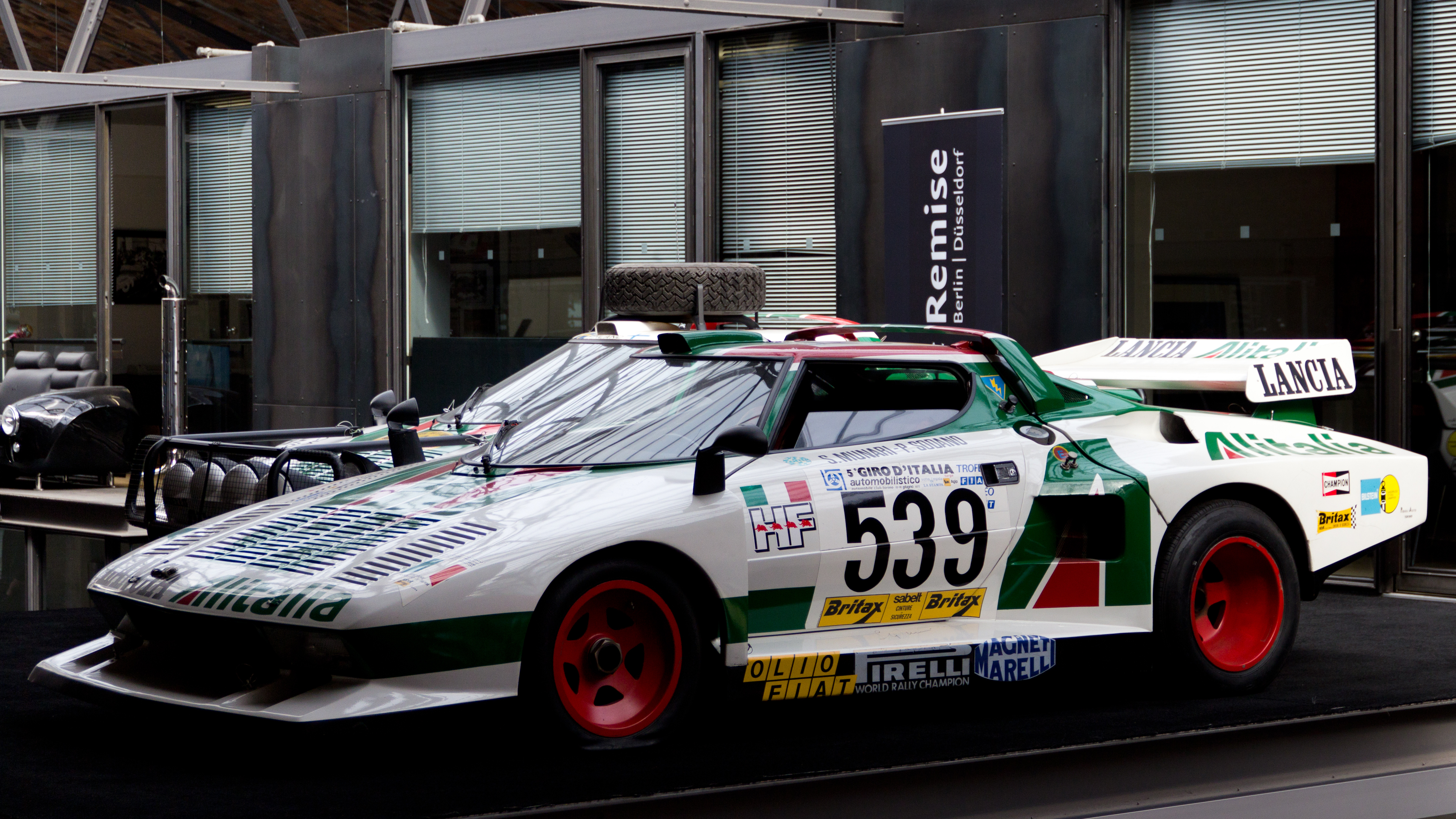
Lancia Stratos Turbo Group 5

Without support from Fiat, and despite new regulations that restricted engine power, the car would remain a serious competitor and proved able to beat works cars in several occasions when entered by an experienced private team with a talented driver. The last victory of the Stratos was in 1981, at the Tour de Corse Automobile, another World Rally Championship event, with a victory by longtime Stratos privateer Bernard Darniche.

When the Fiat group favoured the Fiat 131 for rallying, Lancia also built two Group 5 turbocharged 'silhouette' Stratos for closed-track endurance racing. The powertrain and aerodynamics were engineered by Nicola Materazzi based on experience gained with the earlier generation. These cars failed against the Porsche 935s on closed tracks but proved successful in hybrid events. Stratos won a record 5 times the Tour de France Automobile between 1973 and 1980, and also the 1974, 1976 and 1978 Giro d'Italia automobilistico, an Italian counterpart of the Tour de France Automobile. One of the cars was destroyed in Zeltweg, when it caught fire due to overheating problems. The last surviving car would win the Giro d'Italia event again before it was shipped to Japan to compete in the Fuji Speedway based Formula Silhouette series, which was never raced. The car would then be sold and reside in the Matsuda Collection before then being sold to a collector of Stratos', Ernst Hrabalek, who had the largest Lancia Stratos Collection in the world at the time, 11 unique Lancia Stratos cars, including the fluorescent red 1971 factory prototype and the 1977 Safari Rally car. (Note: Many sources in the 2000s claimed the car belonged to the son of Ernst, Christian Hrabalek, when in fact it was 'loaned' to him.) The Stratos also gained limited success in 24 Hours of Le Mans, with a car, driven by Christine Dacremont and Lella Lombardi, finishing 20th overall and 2nd in GTP class in 1976.

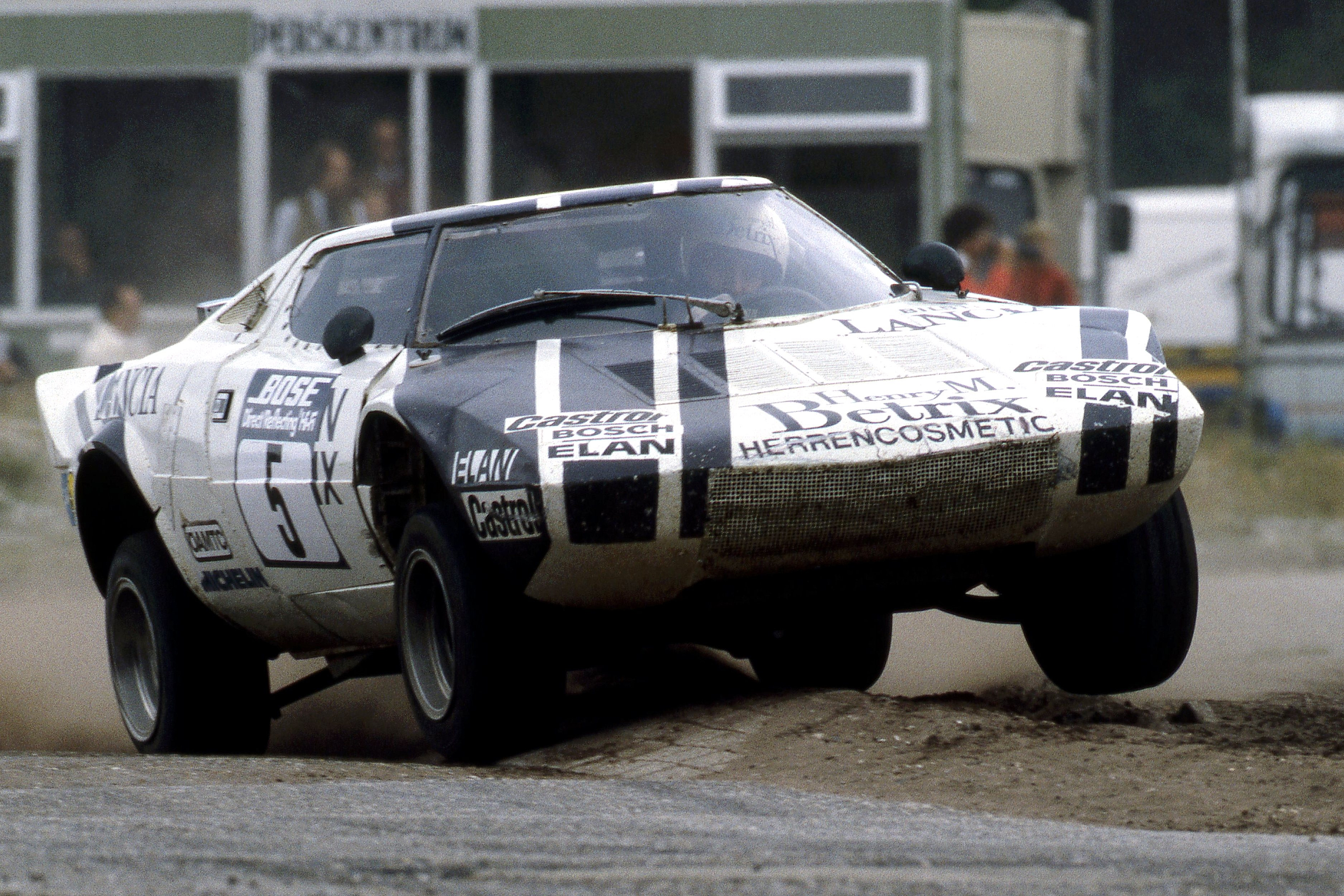
1983 Andy Bentza and his RX Lancia Stratos HF, the only 3.0 L Stratos

Another unique Group 5 car is the Lancia Stratos HF of Austrian Rallycross driver Andy Bentza. The car was first driven by his Memphis teammate Franz Wurz, father of Formula One pilot Alexander Wurz. In 1976 Wurz claimed the first ever European Rallycross title recognised by the FIA with the car, by then still featuring a 2.4-litre engine with first a 12- and later a 24-valve head. For the ERC series of 1977 Wurz was entrusted with an experimental 24-valve engine by Mike Parkes, equipped with a special crankshaft to bring the engine capacity up to just under 3000 cc. For 1978 Bentza took the Stratos over from Wurz, sold his own 2.4 L 12V Stratos to compatriot Reneé Vontsina and won the GT Division title of the ERC. The one and only 3.0 litre Stratos worldwide was raced by Bentza till the end of 1983. After keeping the car for another 30 years Bentza has sold the Stratos to Alexander Wurz. It was fully restored over a period of almost two years and revealed to the public in May 2016, converted back to its 1976 rallycross specification with Memphis livery.

=== WRC victories ===
No.	Event	Season	Driver	Co-driver
1	(Italy) 16º Rallye Sanremo	1974	(Italy) Sandro Munari	(Italy) Mario Mannucci
2	(Canada) 3rd Rally Rideau Lakes	1974	(Italy) Sandro Munari	(Italy) Mario Mannucci
3	(France) 18ème Tour de Corse	1974	(France) Jean-Claude Andruet	(France) "Biche"
4	(Monaco) 43ème Rallye Automobile de Monte-Carlo	1975	(Italy) Sandro Munari	(Italy) Mario Mannucci
5	(Sweden) 25th International Swedish Rally	1975	(Sweden) Björn Waldegård	(Sweden) Hans Thorszelius
6	(Italy) 17º Rallye Sanremo	1975	(Sweden) Björn Waldegård	(Sweden) Hans Thorszelius
7	(France) 19ème Tour de Corse	1975	(France) Bernard Darniche	(France) Alain Mahé
8	(Monaco) 44ème Rallye Automobile de Monte-Carlo	1976	(Italy) Sandro Munari	(Italy) Silvio Maiga
9	9º Rallye de Portugal Vinho do Porto	1976	(Italy) Sandro Munari	(Italy) Silvio Maiga
10	(Italy) 18º Rallye Sanremo	1976	(Sweden) Björn Waldegård	(Sweden) Hans Thorszelius
11	(France) 20ème Tour de Corse	1976	(Italy) Sandro Munari	(Italy) Silvio Maiga
12	(Monaco) 45ème Rallye Automobile de Monte-Carlo	1977	(Italy) Sandro Munari	(Italy) Silvio Maiga
13	(Italy) 20º Rallye Sanremo	1978	(Finland) Markku Alén	(Finland) Ilkka Kivimäki
14	(Spain) 26º RACE Rallye de España	1978	(Italy) Tony Carello	(Italy)
15	(Monaco) 47ème Rallye Automobile de Monte-Carlo	1979	(France) Bernard Darniche	(France) Alain Mahé
16	(Italy) 21º Rallye Sanremo	1979	(Italy) Antonio "Tony" Fassina	(Italy) Mauro Mannini
17	(France) 23ème Tour de Corse	1979	(France) Bernard Darniche	(France) Alain Mahé
18	(France) 25ème Tour de Corse	1981	(France) Bernard Darniche	(France) Alain Mahé

== Concept cars ==
=== Stratos Zero ===
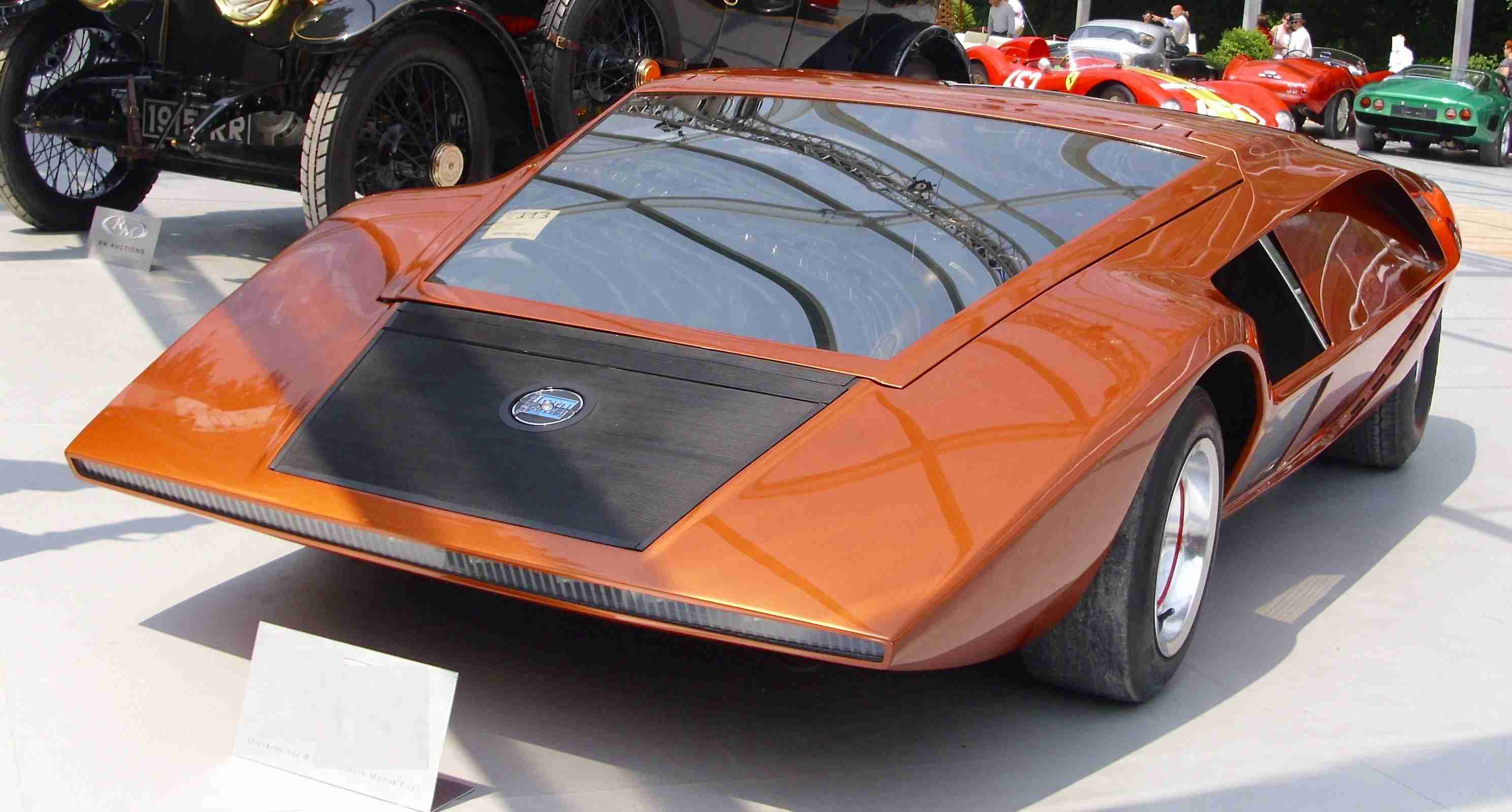
1970 Stratos Zero concept car

The Lancia Stratos Zero (or 0) preceded the Lancia Stratos HF prototype by 12 months and was first shown to the public at the Turin Motor Show in 1970. The futuristic bodywork was designed by Marcello Gandini, head designer at Bertone, and featured a 1.6 L Lancia Fulvia V4 engine. The Lancia Stratos HF Zero was exhibited in Bertone's museum for many years. In 2011, it was sold during an auction in Italy for €761,600. It has been displayed in the exhibit "Sculpture in Motion: Masterpieces of Italian Design" at the Petersen Automotive Museum in Los Angeles. It was at the High Museum of Art in Atlanta at the "Dream Cars" exhibit in 2014, on loan from the XJ Wang Collection of New York City.

The car's body is wedge-shaped and finished in distinctive orange. It is unusually short in length (3.58 m (141 in)) and height (84 cm (33 in)), and it shares little with the production version. The Zero appeared in Michael Jackson's 1988 film Moonwalker.

=== Lancia Sibilo ===
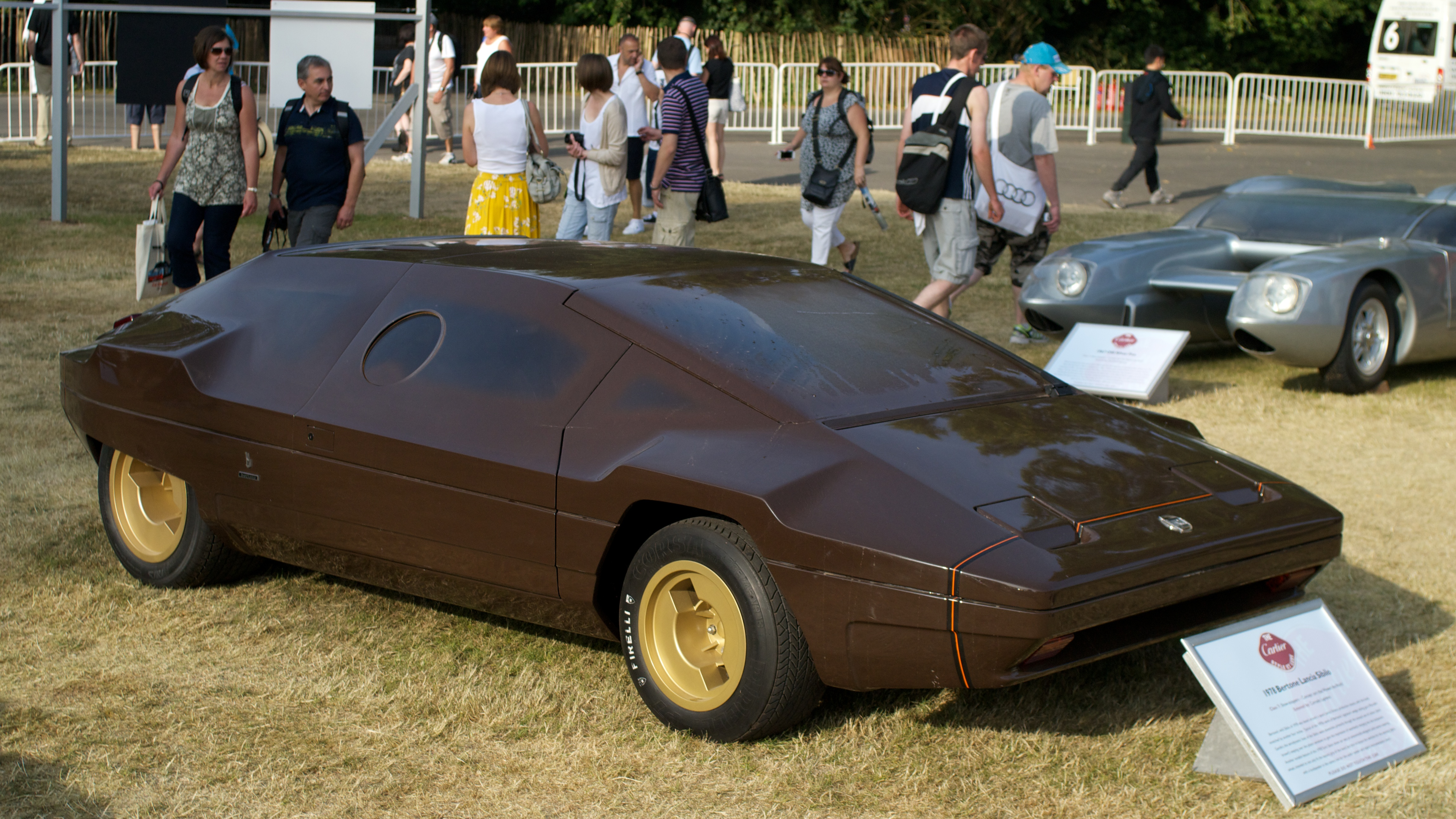
Lancia Sibilo

In 1978, Bertone designed and built the Lancia Sibilo, a concept car based on the Stratos, the wheelbase of which was lengthened from 2180 to 2280 mm. It was conceived as a futuristic two-seater coupè, with glass surfaces that seemed almost integrated into the volumes of the body.

=== Stola S81 ===
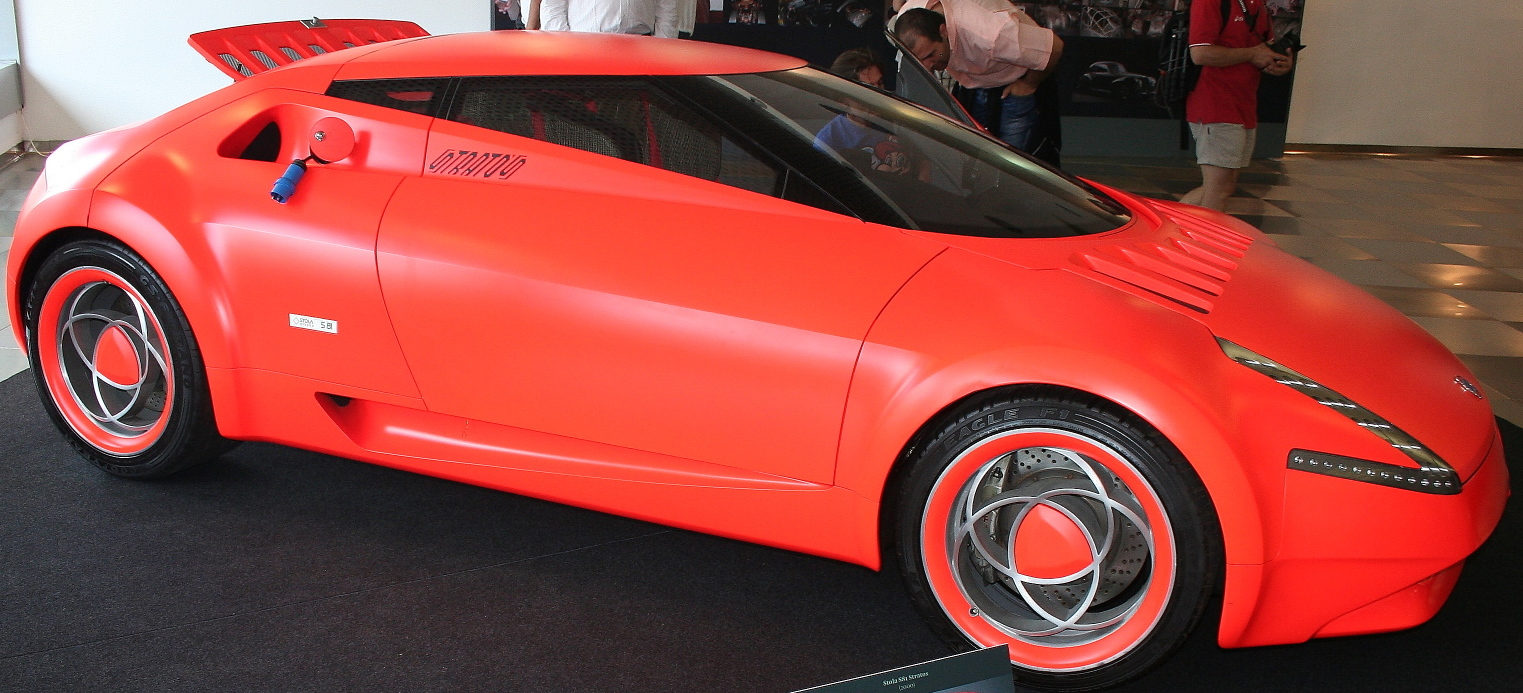
Stola S81 Stratos

In 2000, Marcello Gandini designed a modern interpretation of his Lancia Stratos, built by Stola of Turin. It debuted at the 2000 Turin Auto Show, 30 years after the Stratos Zero concept debuted at the same show. The concept is a two-seater coupe, painted in a similar shade of orange to the original 1971 Stratos HF prototype, and sharing key design elements with the Stratos, such as the wedge shape and wraparound windshield. It also featured new technologies such as LED headlights and taillights, and electric door openers. It was initially built as just a static model, although it was envisioned to be able to fit a Maserati V8 engine. It was later fitted with an electric motor in 2014. The design initially planned to incorporate the Lancia shield into the front bumper, but after Lancia viewed the car, they requested that their logo not be used in order to not cause confusion. After this, the design was changed to incorporate Gandini’s own logo instead. However, a wheel design was chosen that featured centers which formed the triangular shape of Lancia’s logo.

=== Fenomenon Stratos (2005) ===
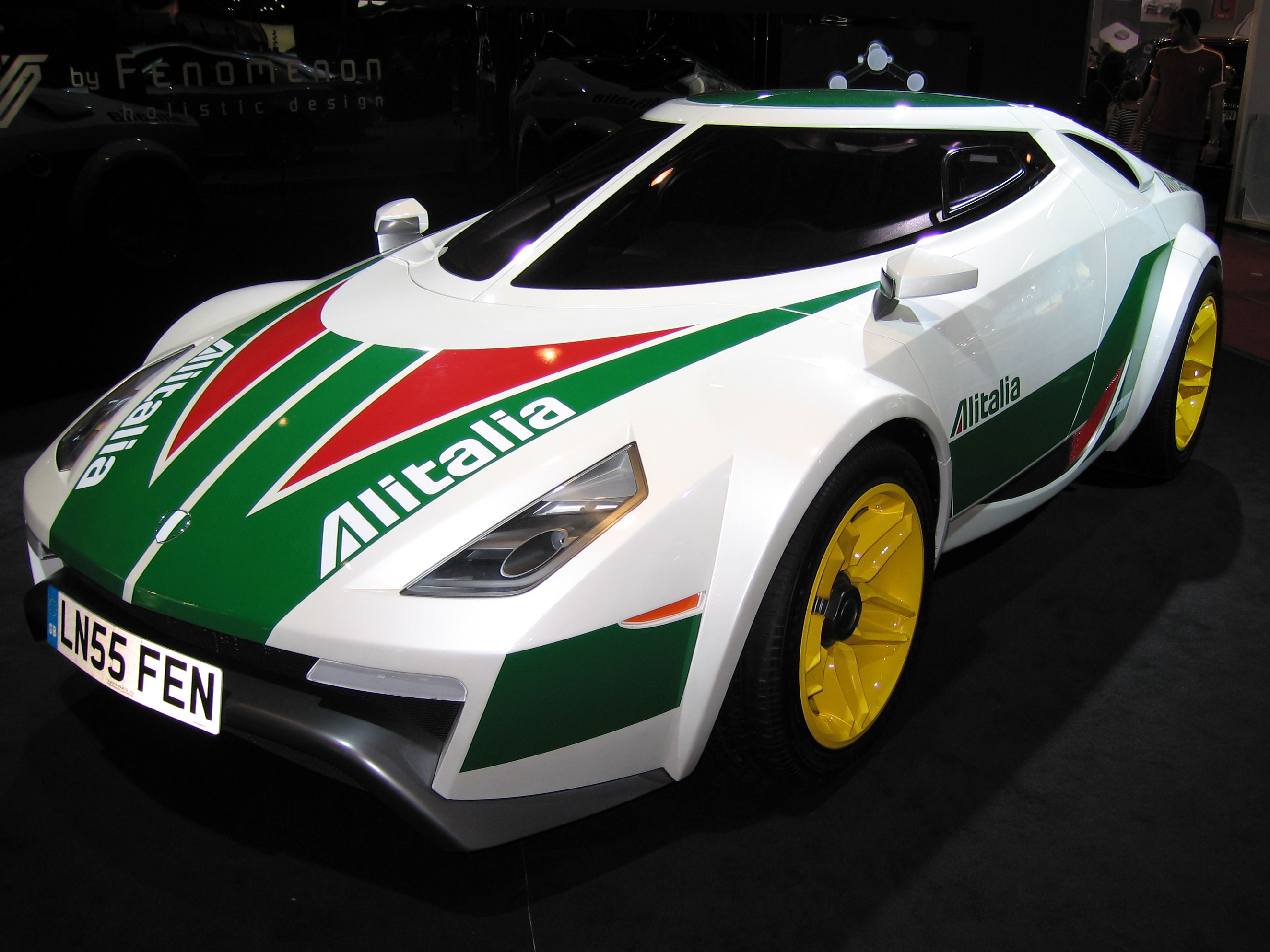
Fenomenon Stratos in Alitalia livery, IAA Frankfurt 2005

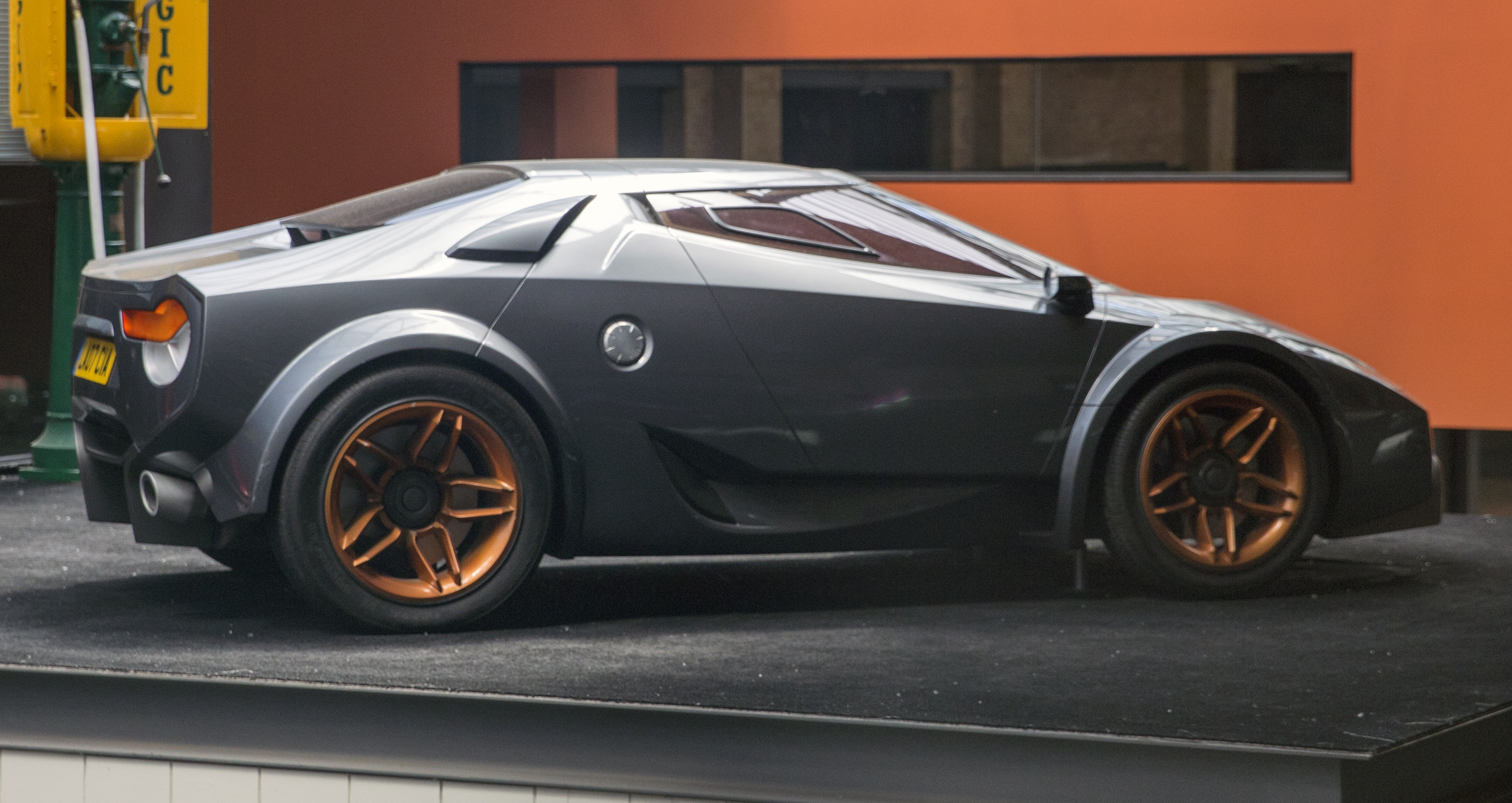
Fenomenon Stratos, Classic Remise Berlin

At the 2005 Geneva Auto Show, a British design firm known as Fenomenon, who had rights to the Stratos name, exhibited a retro-modern concept version of the Stratos, designed by Chris Hrabalek and following its exhibition at the Frankfurt show, developed by Prodrive. The concept was based around a mid-mounted 419 hp (312 kW) V8 engine.

== New Stratos ==
New Stratos

Overview
- Manufacturer: Pininfarina; Manifattura Automobili Torino
- Also called: Pininfarina Stratos
- Production: 2018–present
- Designer: Luca Borgogno at Pininfarina

Body and chassis
- Class: Sports car (S)
- Body style: 2-door coupé
- Layout: Rear mid-engine, rear-wheel drive
- Related: Ferrari F430 Scuderia

Powertrain
- Engine: 4.3 L Ferrari F136 V8
- Transmission: 6-speed 'F1' automated manual 6-speed manual

Dimensions
- Wheelbase: 2,400 mm (94.49 in)
- Length: 4,181 mm (164.6 in)
- Width: 1,971 mm (77.6 in)
- Height: 1,240 mm (48.8 in)
- Curb weight: 1,247 kg (2,749 lb)

Following the stalled Fenomenon project, one interested backer funded a one-off model. Commissioned by Michael Stoschek (a keen rally driver and chairman of Brose Group) and his son, Maximilian, the New Stratos was announced in 2010 based on the overall design and concept of the original Stratos and was designed and developed by Pininfarina.

The car made use of a Ferrari 430 Scuderia as a donor car, using the chassis (shortened by 200 mm (7.9 in) resulting in a wheelbase of 2,400 mm (94.49 in)) and much of the mechanical elements including the 4.3 L V8 engine (4,308 cm^{3}), tuned to generate 540 hp (403 kW) at 8,200 rpm (also reported at 550 bhp (410 kW)) and torque of 520 N⋅m (384 lb⋅ft) at 3,750 rpm.

The New Stratos weighs 1,247 kg (2,749 lb) and is claimed to accelerate to 100 km/h (62 mph) in 3.3 seconds and on to a top speed close to 320 km/h (200 mph). While shorter than its donor car, the New Stratos is a little larger than the original Stratos, with a length of 4,181 mm (164.6 in), 1,971 mm (77.6 in) wide and 1,240 mm (48.8 in) tall. There were reports that given sufficient interest a small production run of up to 25 cars could be possible. Ferrari did not consent to this plan, and forbade its suppliers to support the project. However, on 10 February 2018, Italian coachbuilding firm Manifattura Automobili Torino of Paolo Garella announced that it would be commencing with the production of the originally planned 25 cars.

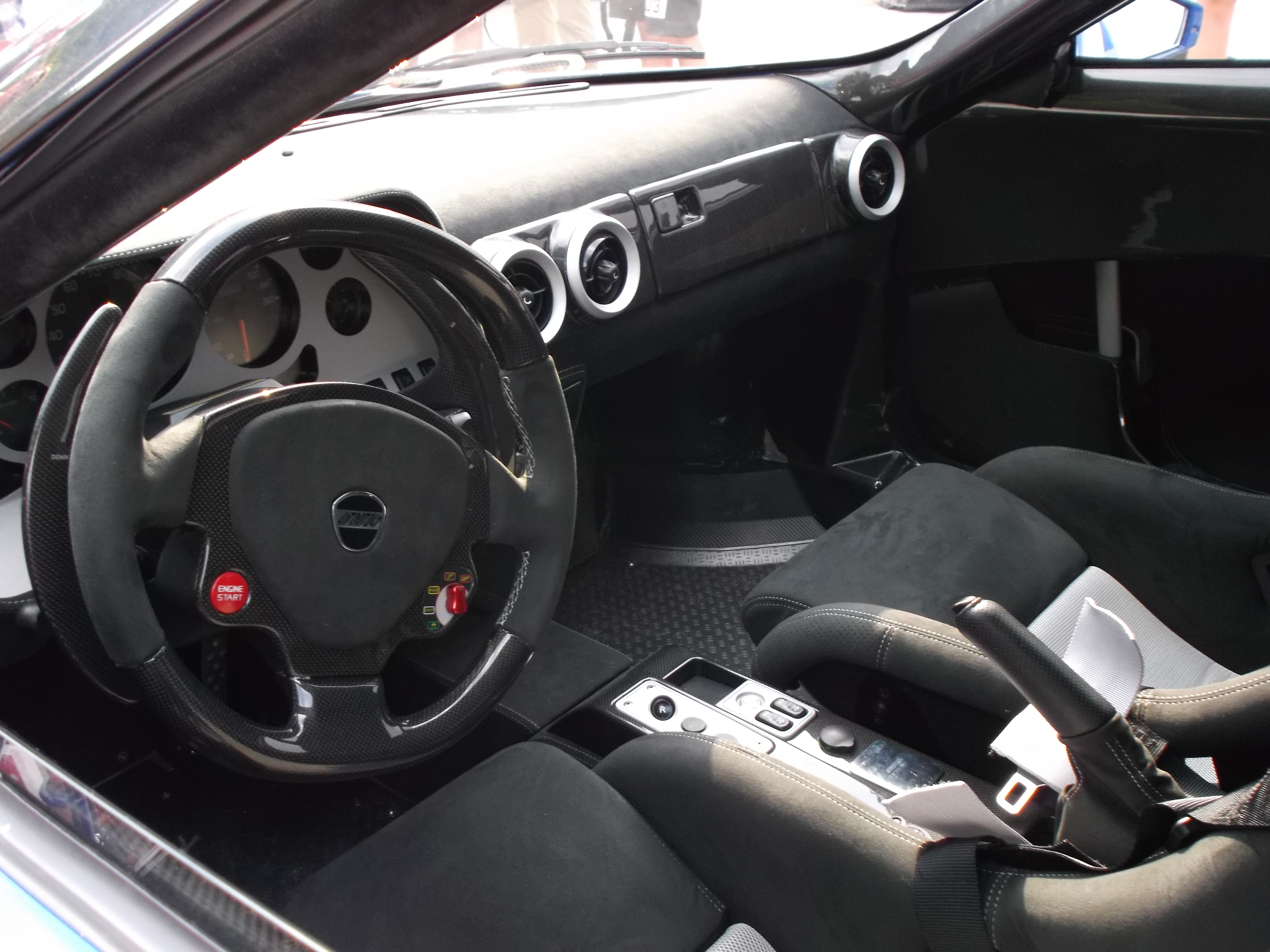
Interior

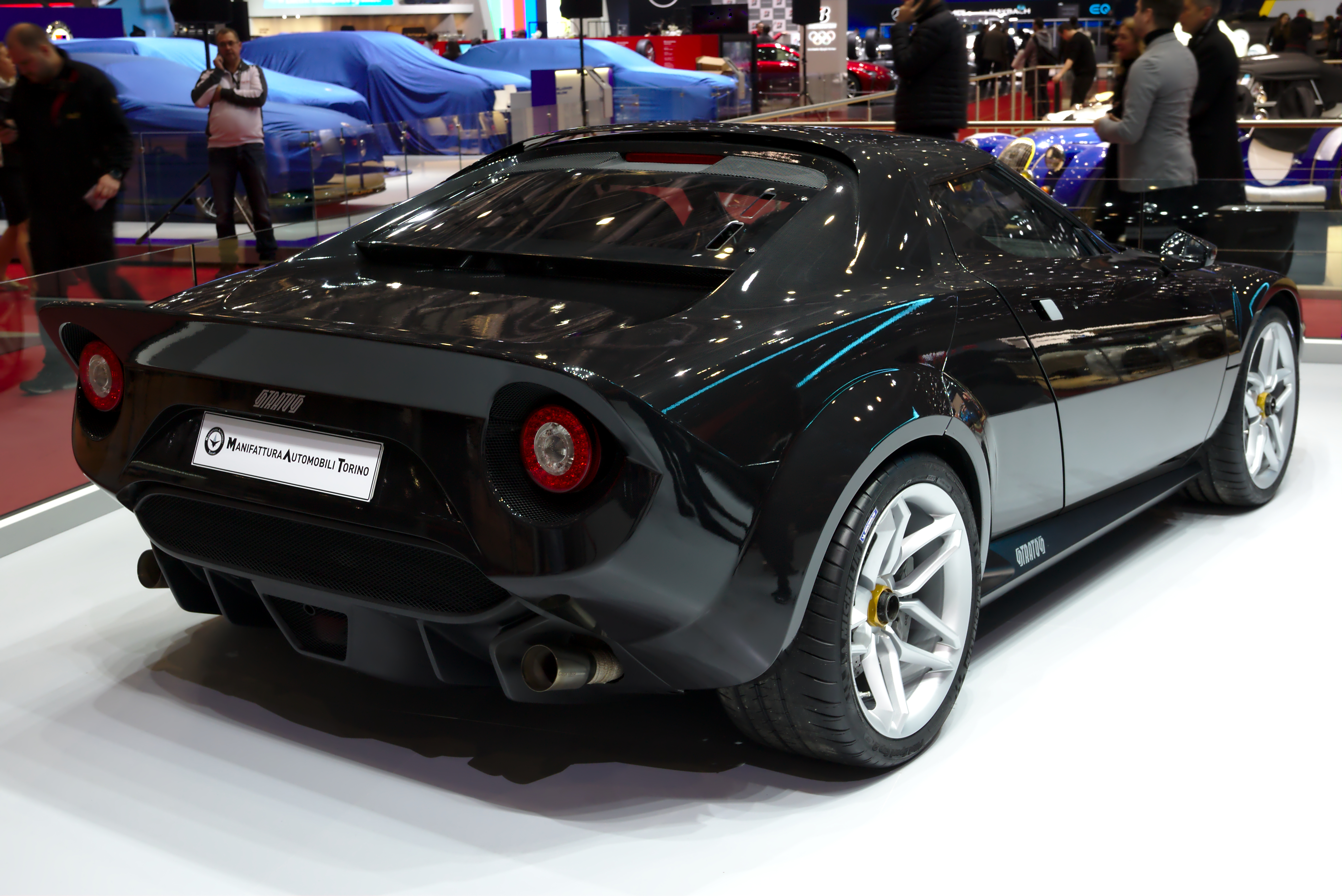
Rear view
