= 1975 World Rally Championship =

3rd season of the World Rally Championship

Champions
- World Manufacturers' Champion: Lancia

Seasons
- ← 1974 1976 →

The 1975 World Rally Championship was the third season of the Fédération Internationale de l'Automobile (FIA) World Rally Championship (WRC). 10 events were included on the schedule, including the return to the series of the famous Monte Carlo and Swedish rallies after a one season absence of those events. Both North American events were removed from the schedule however. Other returning entries to the schedule included the Acropolis Rally in Greece, which would become a staple of the WRC circuit to this day, and the Rallye du Maroc.

Lancia, with its powerful Stratos HF, continued its dominance despite struggling with reliability. Lancia won four rallies during the season however, outpacing competitors Fiat and Alpine-Renault. The battle for second place in the season was ultimately determined by a single point, with Fiat outscoring Alpine-Renault 61 points to 60, while Opel's Ascona made a strong bid to be competitive, scoring 58 points.

From 1973 to 1978, the WRC only awarded a championship for manufacturers. Scoring was given for the highest placing entry for each manufacturer. Thus if a particular manufacturer was to place 2nd, 4th, and 10th, they would receive points for 2nd place only. However, the manufacturer would still gain an advantage in scoring from its other entries, as the points for the 4th and 10th place entries would be denied to other manufacturers.

== Calendar ==
After the oil crisis of 1973 that affected the 1974 season, the Rallye du Maroc returned to the calendar.

Round	Rally name	Surface	Dates
1	(Monaco) Monte Carlo Rally	Mixed (Tarmac - Snow)	15–24 January
2	(Sweden) Swedish Rally	Snow	13–15 February
3	(Kenya) Safari Rally	Gravel	25–31 March
4	(Canada) Rally of the Rideau Lakes	Gravel	16-19 April
5	(Greece) Acropolis Rally	Gravel	24–31 May
6	(Morocco) Rallye du Maroc	Gravel	24–28 June
7	Rally de Portugal	Mixed (Tarmac - Gravel)	18–21 July
8	(Finland) 1000 Lakes Rally	Gravel	29–31 August
9	(Italy) Rallye Sanremo	Mixed (Tarmac - Gravel)	1–4 October
10	(France) Tour de Corse	Tarmac	8–9 November
11	(United Kingdom) RAC Rally	Gravel	22–26 November

== Manufacturers' championship ==
Points were awarded to the best placed vehicle of each manufacturer.

Schedule of points by place:

Place	1st	2nd	3rd	4th	5th	6th	7th	8th	9th	10th
Points	20	15	12	10	8	6	4	3	2	1

Pos.	Manufacturer	(Monaco) MON	(Sweden) SWE	(Kenya) KEN	(Greece) GRC	(Morocco) MAR	(Portugal) POR	(Finland) FIN	(Italy) ITA	(France) FRA	(United Kingdom) GBR	Points
1	(Italy) Lancia	20	20	15	-	-	-	-	20	20	1	96
2	(Italy) Fiat	15	8	-	-	-	20	-	15	-	3	61
3	(France) Alpine-Renault	6	-	-	15	12	-	-	12	15	-	60
4	(Germany) Opel	-	3	-	20	-	10	8	6	1	10	58
5	(France) Peugeot	-	-	20	-	20	-	-	-	-	-	40
6	(United States) Ford	-	1	-	-	-	2	12	-	-	20	35
7	(Japan) Toyota	-	-	-	-	-	12	20	-	-	-	32
8	(Sweden) Saab	-	-	6	-	6	8	6	-	-	-	30
9	(Japan) Datsun	3	-	-	4	-	-	-	4	12	-	26
10	(Italy) Alfa Romeo	3	-	-	4	-	-	-	4	12	-	23
11	(Japan) Mitsubishi	-	-	10	12	-	-	-	-	-	-	22
12	(France) Citroën	-	-	-	-	10	3	-	-	-	-	13
13	(Germany) Porsche	4	-	-	-	-	-	-	8	-	-	12
14	(Sweden) Volvo	-	2	-	6	1	-	-	-	-	-	9
15=	(France) Renault	8	-	-	-	-	-	-	-	-	-	8
15=	(Germany) Audi	-	-	-	8	-	-	-	-	-	-	8
17	(Czechoslovakia) Škoda	-	4	-	-	-	-	-	-	-	-	4
18=	(United States) Chrysler	-	-	-	-	-	-	2	-	-	-	2
18=	(United Kingdom) Vauxhall	-	-	-	-	-	-	-	-	-	2	2
20=	(Germany) BMW	1	-	-	-	-	-	-	-	-	-	1
20=	(Soviet Union) Lada	-	-	-	1	-	-	-	-	-	-	1
Pos.	Manufacturer	(Monaco) MON	(Sweden) SWE	(Kenya) KEN	(Greece) GRC	(Morocco) MAR	(Portugal) POR	(Finland) FIN	(Italy) ITA	(France) FRA	(United Kingdom) GBR	Points

== Events ==
1975 World Rally Championship event map
Black = Tarmac	Brown = Gravel	Blue = Snow/Ice	Red = Mixed Surface

1975 World Rally Championship schedule and results
Rally Name	Start-End Date	Podium Drivers (Finishing Time)	Podium Cars
(Monaco) Rallye Monte Carlo	15–23 January	1. (Italy) Sandro Munari (6h:25m:59s); 2. (Finland) Hannu Mikkola (6h:29m:05s); 3. (Finland) Markku Alén (6h:29m:46s)	1. Lancia Stratos HF; 2. Fiat Abarth 124 Rallye; 3. Fiat Abarth 124 Rallye
(Sweden) Swedish Rally	13–15 February	1. (Sweden) Björn Waldegård (7h:19m:46s); 2. (Sweden) Stig Blomqvist (7h:21m:33s); 3. (Finland) Simo Lampinen (7h:31m:22s)	1. Lancia Stratos HF; 2. Saab 96 V4; 3. Lancia Beta Coupé
(Kenya) Safari Rally	27–31 March	1. (Sweden) Ove Andersson (+11m:58s penalties); 2. (Italy) Sandro Munari (+12m:36s penalties); 3. (Sweden) Björn Waldegård (+13m:57s penalties)	1. Peugeot 504; 2. Lancia Stratos HF; 3. Lancia Stratos HF
(Greece) Acropolis Rally	24–31 May	1. (West Germany) Walter Röhrl (9h:20m:36s); 2. (Greece) Tasos'Siroco' Livieratos (9h:56m:18s); 3. (Cyprus) Mihalis Koumas (11h:35m:53s)	1. Opel Ascona; 2. Alpine-Renault A110 1800; 3. Mitsubishi Galant
(Morocco) Rallye du Maroc	24–28 June	1. (Finland) Hannu Mikkola (23h:30m:48s); 2. (France) Bernard Consten (25h:12m:03s); 3. (France) Bob Neyret (25h:48m:19s)	1. Peugeot 504; 2. Peugeot 504; 3. Alpine-Renault A110 1800
Rallye de Portugal	18–21 July	1. (Finland) Markku Alén (6h:24m:15s); 2. (Finland) Hannu Mikkola (6h:26m:58s); 3. (Sweden) Ove Andersson (6h:29m:29s)	1. Fiat Abarth 124 Rallye; 2. Fiat Abarth 124 Rallye; 3. Toyota Corolla
(Finland) 1000 Lakes Rally	29–31 August	1. (Finland) Hannu Mikkola (2h:52m:33s); 2. (Finland) Simo Lampinen (2h:53m:47s); 3. (Finland) Timo Mäkinen (2h:54m:35s)	1. Toyota Corolla; 2. Saab 96 V4; 3. Ford Escort RS1800
(Italy) Rallye Sanremo	4–10 October	1. (Sweden) Björn Waldegård (10h:22m:52s); 2. (Italy) Maurizio Verini (10h:25m:40s); 3. (France) Jean-Luc Thérier (10h:59m:04s)	1. Lancia Stratos HF; 2. Fiat Abarth 124 Rallye; 3. Alpine-Renault A110 1800
(France) Tour de Corse	8–9 November	1. (France) Bernard Darniche (4h:58m:26s); 2. (France) Jean-Pierre Nicolas (4h:58m:58s); 3. (France) Jean-Claude Andruet (5h:09m:51s)	1. Lancia Stratos HF; 2. Alpine-Renault A110 1800; 3. Alfa Romeo Alfetta GT
(United Kingdom) RAC Rally	22–26 November	1. (Finland) Timo Mäkinen (6h:00m:44s); 2. (United Kingdom) Roger Clark (6h:01m:57s); 3. (United Kingdom) Tony Fowkes (6h:06m:11s)	1. Ford Escort RS1800; 2. Ford Escort RS1800; 3. Ford Escort RS1800

== See also ==
- 1975 in sports
