= 1975 Monte Carlo Rally =

Rallying motorsport event

1975 Monte Carlo Rally 43ème Rallye Automobile de Monte-Carlo
Round 1 of the 1975 World Rally Championship
Next event →
- Host country: Monaco
- Dates run: 15 – 23 January 1975
- Stage surface: Asphalt

Statistics
- Crews: 96 at start, 43 at finish

Overall results
- Overall winner: (Italy) Sandro Munari; Lancia Stratos HF

The 1975 Monte Carlo Rally was the 43rd Rallye Automobile de Monte-Carlo. It was won by Sandro Munari.

== Results ==
| Pos. | No. | Driver | Car | Time |
|---|---|---|---|---|
| 1 | 14 | (Italy) Sandro Munari | Lancia Stratos HF | 6:25:59 |
| 2 | 2 | (Finland) Hannu Mikkola | Fiat 124 Abarth Rallye | 6:29:05 |
| 3 | 10 | (Finland) Markku Alén | Fiat 124 Abarth Rallye | 6:29:46 |
| 4 | 12 | (Italy) Fulvio Bacchelli | Fiat 124 Abarth Rallye | 6:47:02 |
| 5 | 20 | (France) Jean-François Piot | Renault 17 Gordini | 6:51:15 |
| 6 | 28 | (France) Jacques Henry | Alpine-Renault A110 | 6:52:12 |
| 7 | 56 | (France) Jean-Pierre Rouget | Porsche 911 | 7:25:00 |
| 8 | 40 | (France) Guy Fréquelin | Alfa Romeo 2000 GTV | 7:33:30 |
| 9 | 41 | (France) Noël Labaune | Porsche 911 | 7:46:25 |
| 10 | 30 | (France) Christian Dorche | BMW 2002 | 7:49:25 |
| 11 | 103 | (France) Michel Andre-Poyaud | Alpine-Renault A110 | 7:58:28 |
| 12 | 48 | (Poland) Maciej Stawowiak | Polski Fiat 125p | 7:58:35 |
| 13 | 26 | (France) Claude Laurent | Citroën GS | 8:01:55 |
| 14 | 35 | (Monaco) Auguste Turiani | Opel Ascona | ?:??:?? |
| 15 | 50 | (Sweden) Anders Sigurdsson | Saab 96 V4 | ?:??:?? |
| 16 | 45 | (Poland) Marian Bień | Polski Fiat 125p | 8:12:29 |
| 17 | 29 | (Luxembourg) Nicolas Koob | BMW 2002 | ?:??:?? |
| 18 | 74 | (Italy) Franco Berruto | Porsche Carrera | ?:??:?? |
| 19 | 57 | (Turkey) Ali Sipahi | Fiat 128 | ?:??:?? |
| 20 | 49 | (France) Alain Follin | Alpine-Renault A110 | ?:??:?? |
| 21 | 106 | (Norway) Leif Vold-Johansen | Saab V4 | ?:??:?? |
| 22 | 126 | (Denmark) Jens Winther | BMW 2002 | ?:??:?? |
| 23 | 97 | (France) Bernard Donguès | Alfa Romeo 2000 | ?:??:?? |
| 24 | 109 | (Italy) Enrico Rocca | Fiat 124 Abarth | ?:??:?? |
| 25 | 77 | (France) Patrick Beaudoin | Lancia Fulvia HF | ?:??:?? |
| 26 | 134 | (United Kingdom) Tony Maslen | Ford Escort RS | ?:??:?? |
| 27 | 139 | (Denmark) Hans-Michael Jelsdorf | Opel Ascona | ?:??:?? |
