= Rally de Portugal =

Portuguese rally competition

- Status: active
- Genre: motorsporting event
- Frequency: annual
- Country: Portugal
- Inaugurated: 1967

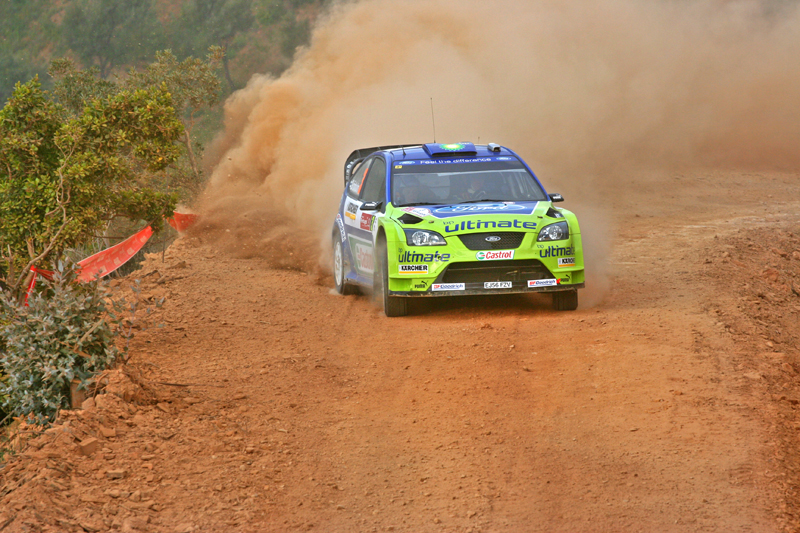
Marcus Grönholm driving a Ford Focus RS WRC 06 at the 2007 rally.

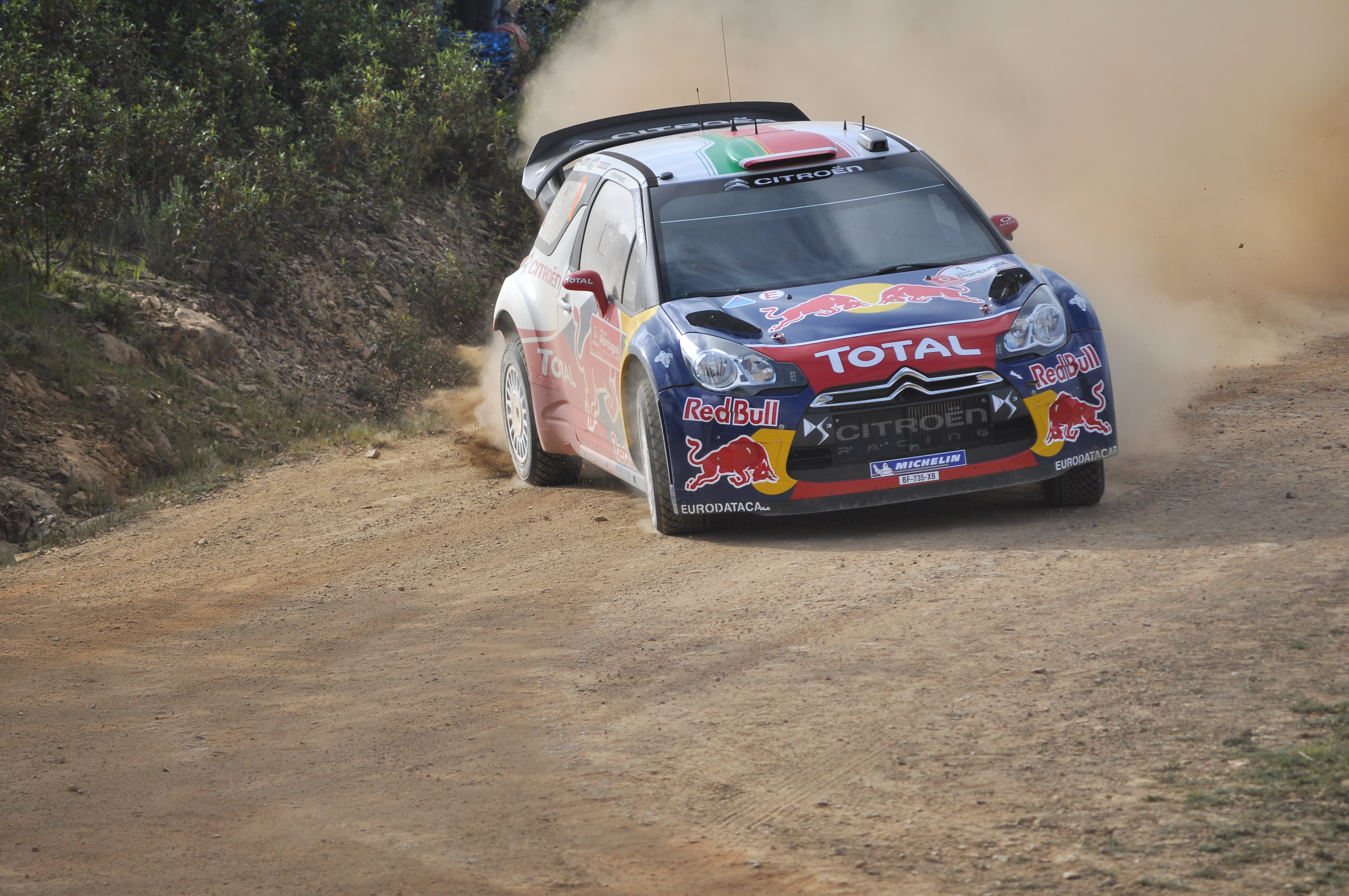
Sébastien Loeb with a Citroën DS3 WRC at the 2011 Rally de Portugal

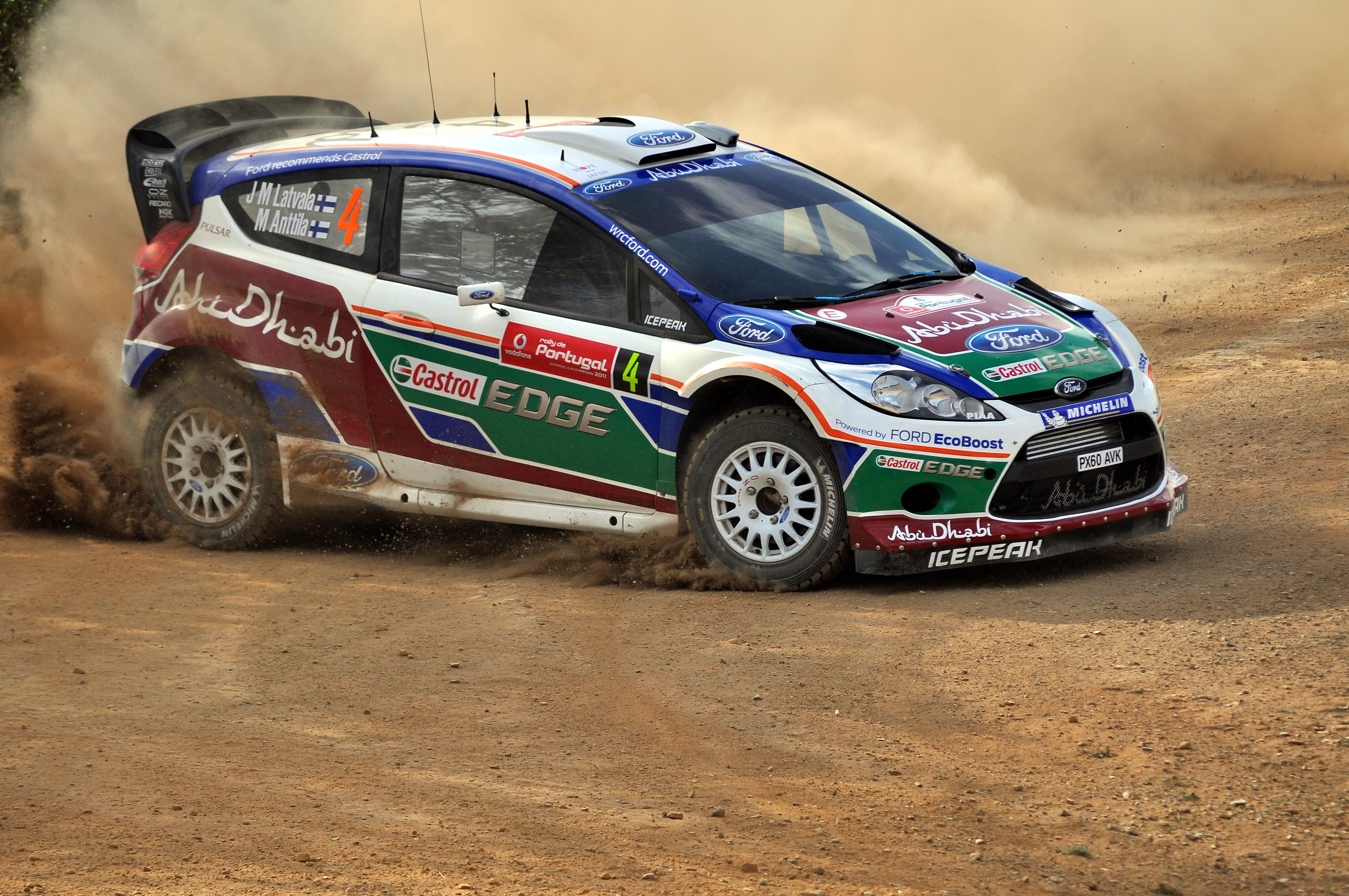
Jari-Matti Latvala with a Ford Fiesta RS WRC at the 2011 Rally de Portugal

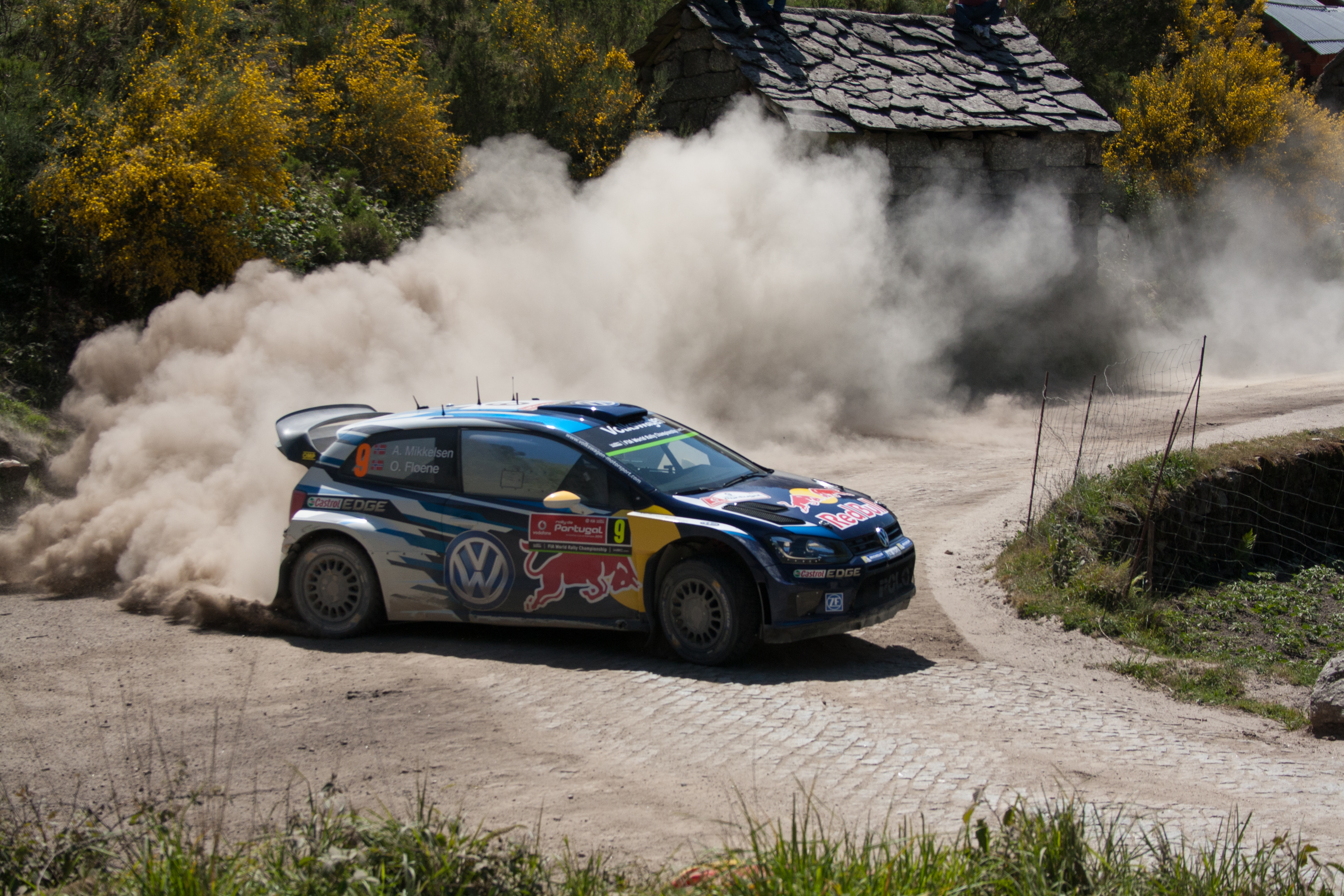
Andreas Mikkelsen and Ola Fløene driving an updated Polo R WRC at the 49º Rally de Portugal.

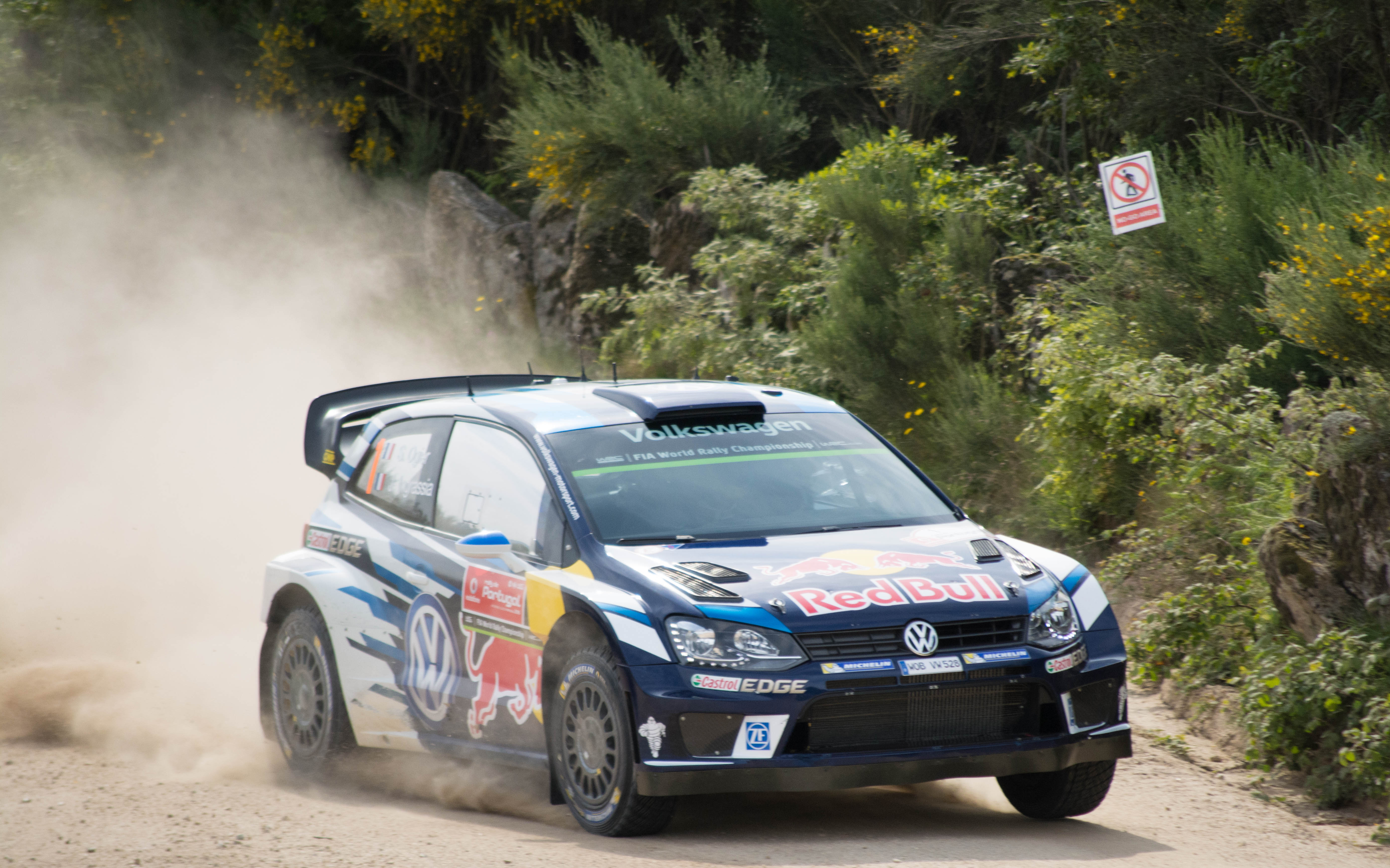
S. Ogier at the 2016 Rally de Portugal with Polo R WRC

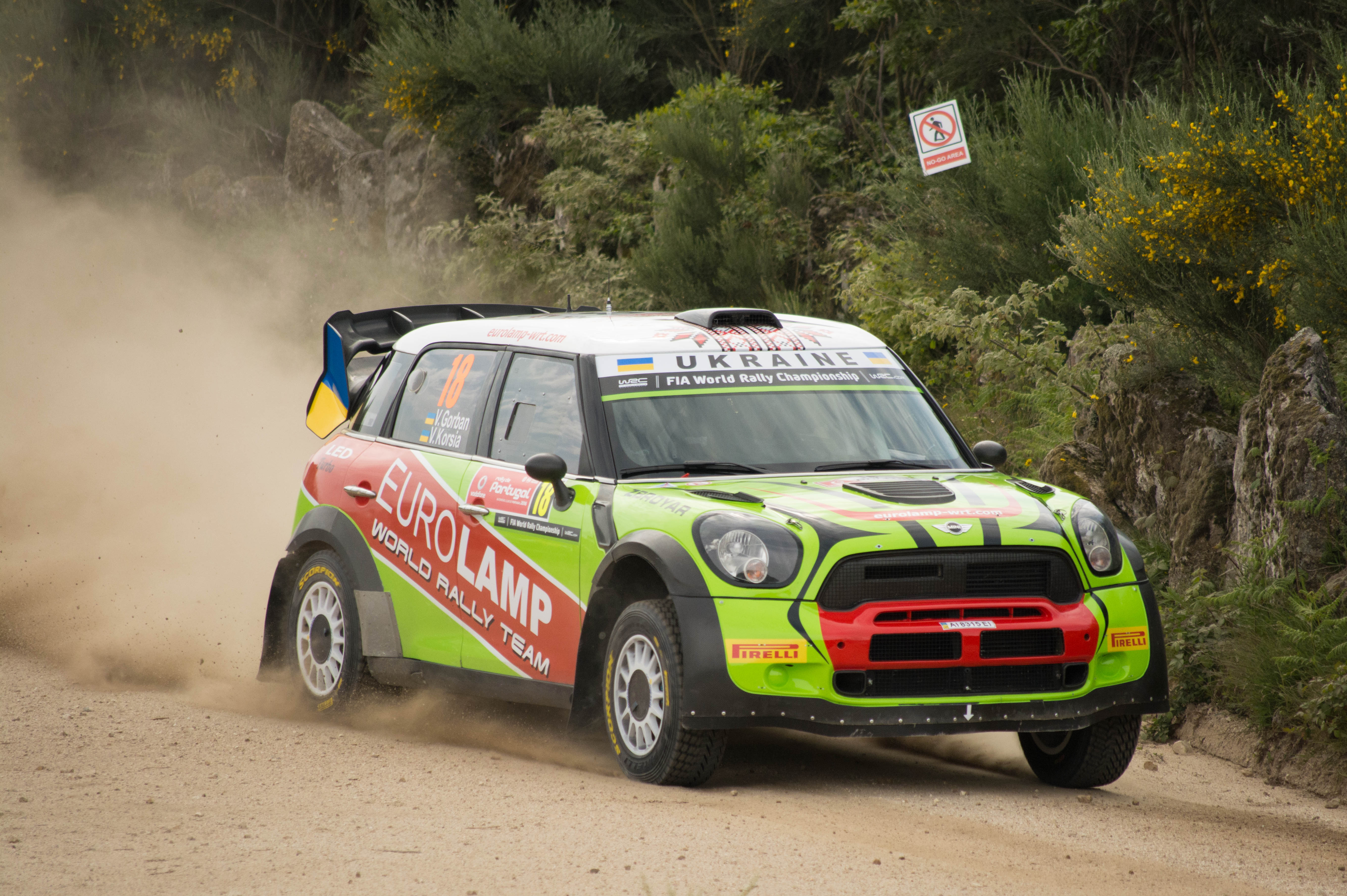
Valeriy Gorban at 2016 Rally de Portugal with Mini John Cooper Works WRC

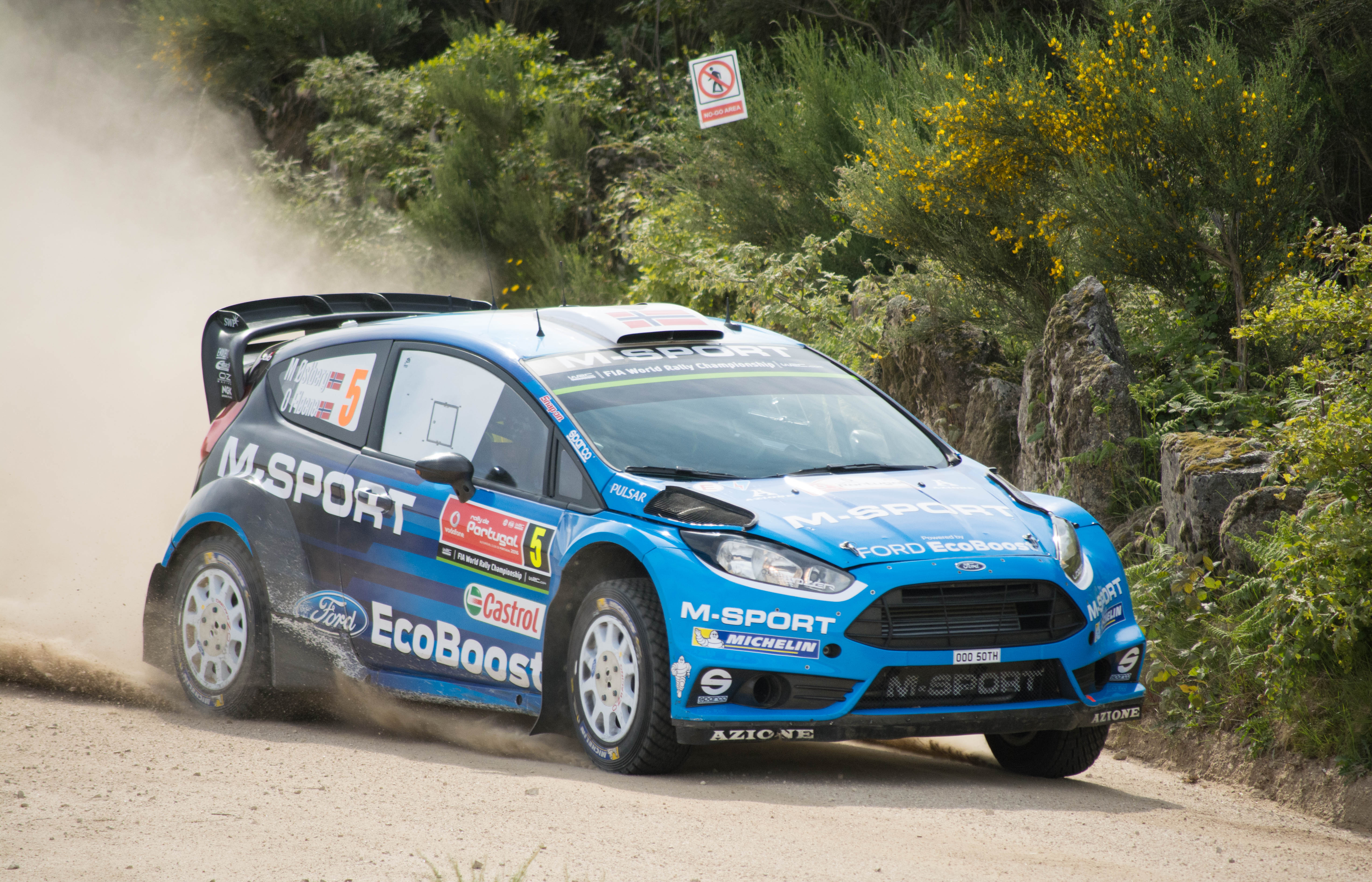
Mads Østberg at 2016 Rally de Portugal with Ford Fiesta RS WRC

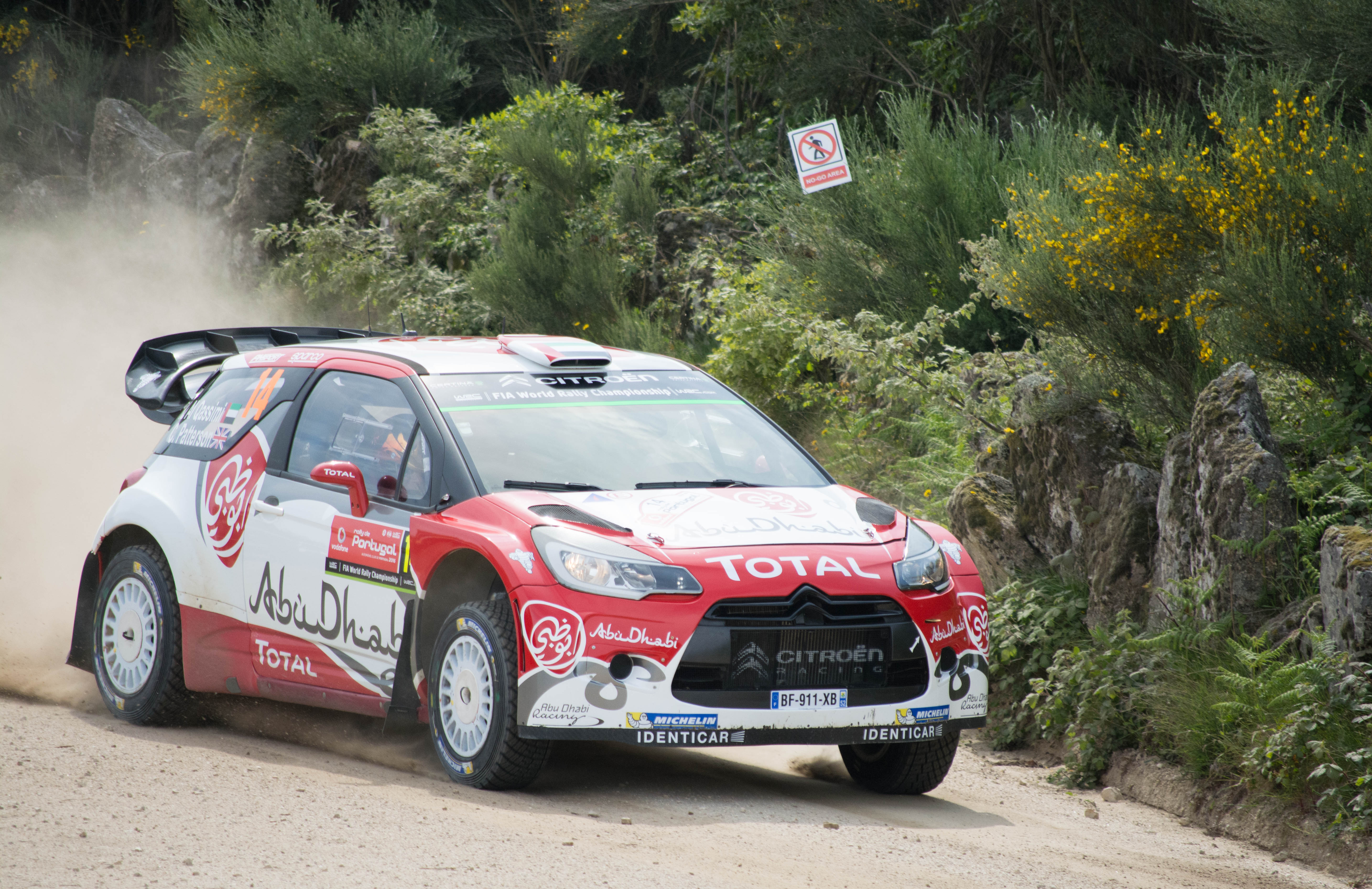
Khalid Al-Qassimi with Citroën DS3 WRC at the 2016 Rally de Portugal

The Rally de Portugal (formerly: Rallye de Portugal) is a rally competition held in Portugal. First held in 1967, the seventh running of the race, the 7º TAP Rallye de Portugal was the third event in the inaugural FIA World Rally Championship in 1973. The rally remained on the WRC calendar for the next 29 years, and after being dropped for 2002–2006, the event returned to Portugal in 2007. During the 1970s, 1980s and early 1990s, Rally de Portugal was a mixed event between asphalt and gravel. Currently it is an all-gravel event.

Rally de Portugal has been awarded "The Best Rally in the World" five times and in 2000 "The Most Improved Rally of the Year". The most successful driver in the history of the rally is Sébastien Ogier, who has won the event seven times (2010, 2011, 2013, 2014, 2017, 2024 and 2025).

== History ==
The Rally of Portugal was extremely popular but also infamous due to poor crowd control. During the 1970s and especially the 1980s, Portugal was known for spectators standing on the roadway even as the cars drove by, often resulting in near-collisions, and finally in the 1986 season a collision between cars and spectators. It was the last year the Group B cars dominated the WRC scene. And it was because of a tragic accident which occurred during the rally that the future of Group B cars came under scrutiny. The final blow came at the Tour de Corse later that year with the death of Henri Toivonen.

In the first section of the rally (Sintra), in the "Lagoa Azul" stage, Portuguese works Ford rally driver Joaquim Santos came over a crest in his RS200 getting too loose through the corner. Santos managed to avoid the crowd on the outside of the corner, but he was not able to avoid the crowd on the inside of the corner. The car left the road, plunging right into the crowd, killing three and injuring dozens more. After this accident all works teams withdrew from the rally.

The combination of poor crowd behavior, and the extreme speeds of Group B cars, was not only dangerous for the crowd, but also for the drivers themselves. Former world champion Timo Salonen admitted at the '86 edition that he was scared to run first on the road. Walter Röhrl had his own theory on the crowd situation: "You just have to see the crowd as a wall and not as spectators."

It did not necessarily go any better in following years. At the 1987 edition a privately entered, FR car driven by Portuguese rally car driver Joaquim Guedes plunged into the crowd. Unfortunately, this led to the death of spectator Manuel Carvalho Da Silva Peixoto, and injured 12 others, but the crowd control was not much improved. It was not until the early 1990s that the Portuguese rally improved crowd control. Crowds were no smaller, but were better-behaved and more aware of the risks involved in spectating.

In the 1980s, the rally had a special stage at the Autódromo do Estoril.

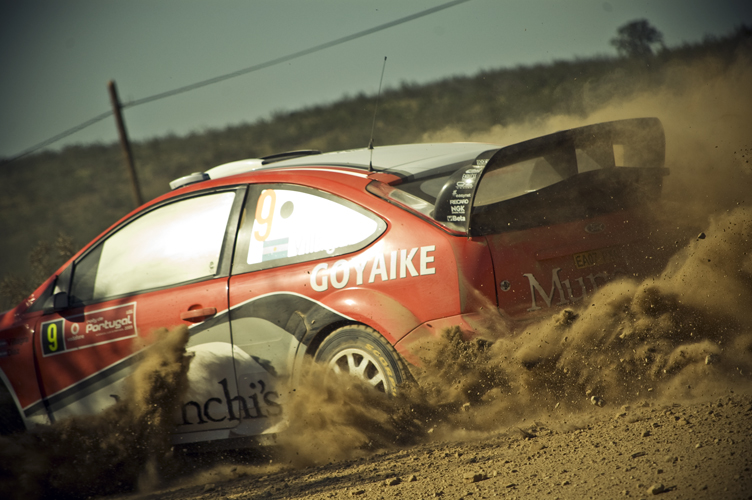
Federico Villagra at the 2009 event.

The last WRC edition of the Portugal rally for five years was run under heavy rain in 2001. It was won by Tommi Mäkinen in a Mitsubishi Lancer Evolution. In 2002, it was replaced in favour of Germany's Rallye Deutschland. In 2005, the organisers of the Rally of Portugal announced their intentions to rejoin the WRC, this time switching locations to an area around the Algarve. This means the character of the rally has changed. It is now fully driven on gravel. This is frowned upon by the Portuguese fans, who consider the Algarve stages less exciting, which is also reflected in lower attendance numbers. In 2006, it ran as an official WRC candidate event for the 2007 WRC calendar and was formally incorporated into the 2007 calendar on 5 July 2006. The 2007 Rally Portugal was the fifth round of the season and was won by Citroën Total's Sébastien Loeb.

After a year in the Intercontinental Rally Challenge schedule, the Rally Portugal returned to the WRC calendar for the 2009 season. The competition in the 2009 Rally Portugal was set in the surroundings of Faro, capital of the Algarve region, on twisty hill sections, with fast blind corners and narrow sections. The first stage in the Estádio Algarve (Algarve Stadium) was won by Henning Solberg, but when the rally really began, Jari-Matti Latvala took the lead. However, he soon suffered a big crash, rolling his Ford Focus WRC 17 times down a steep mountain. The rally was eventually won by Loeb.

The 2020 edition of the rally was cancelled due to the COVID-19 pandemic.

In May 2025, the organizers of Rally de Portugal announced a three-year agreement with WRC Promoter, securing the event's place on the World Rally Championship calendar through 2028. However, on 29 September 2026, the Automóel Club de Portugal announced that the rally would be excluded from the 2027 calendar, despite having previously been scheduled for 13-16 May. The decision followed changes to the championship calendar intended to increase its geographical diversity. Organizers subsequently began discussion with WRC Promoters regarding a possible return in 2028.

== Editions ==
=== 1967–2001 ===
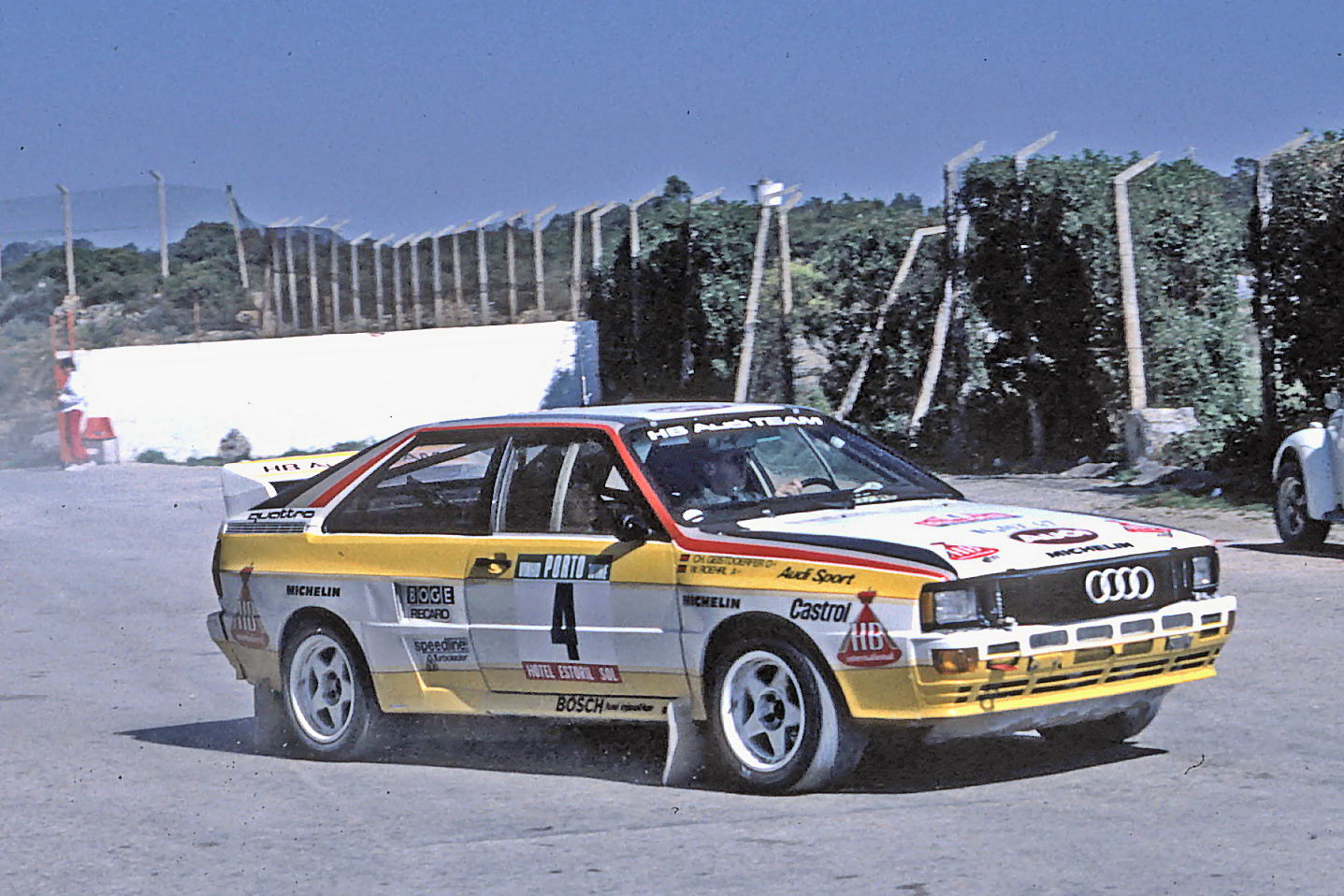
Walter Röhrl at the 1984 rally with an Audi Quattro A2.

Rally name	Stages	Podium finishers			
Rally name	Stages	Rank	Driver co-driver	Team Car	Time
1º Rallye de Portugal; 1967	8 stages 47.60 km*	1	(Portugal) Carpinteiro Albino (Portugal) Silva Pereira	(France) Renault 8 Gordini	14758.9 pts
1º Rallye de Portugal; 1967	8 stages 47.60 km*	2	(Portugal) António Peixinho (Portugal) João Canas Mendes	(United Kingdom) Ford Cortina Lotus	15888.9 pts
1º Rallye de Portugal; 1967	8 stages 47.60 km*	3	(France) Joseph Bourdon (France) Claude Bertrand	(France) Renault 8 Gordini	22560.5 pts
2º Rallye de Portugal; 1968	8 stages 94.60 km*	1	(United Kingdom) Tony Fall (United Kingdom) R. Cellin	(Italy) Lancia Fulvia HF	16503.3 pts
2º Rallye de Portugal; 1968	8 stages 94.60 km*	2	(United Kingdom) Paddy Hopkirk (United Kingdom) Tony Nash	(United Kingdom) BMC Cooper S 1300	17989.6 pts
2º Rallye de Portugal; 1968	8 stages 94.60 km*	3	(Portugal) António Peixinho (Portugal) João Canas Mendes	(United Kingdom) Morris Cooper S	22661.8 pts
3º Rallye de Portugal; 1969	10 stages 140.00 km*	1	(Portugal) Francisco Romãozinho (Portugal) "Jocames"	(France) Citroën DS	104759 pts
3º Rallye de Portugal; 1969	10 stages 140.00 km*	2	(Portugal) José Lampreia (Portugal) Christian Melville	(Japan) Datsun 1600 SSS	113476 pts
3º Rallye de Portugal; 1969	10 stages 140.00 km*	3	(Belgium) Chris van Stalle (Belgium) Robert Loyens	(Japan) Datsun 1600 SSS	113945 pts
4º TAP Rallye de Portugal; 1970	12 stages 205.50 km	1	(Finland) Simo Lampinen (United Kingdom) John Davenport	(Italy) Lancia Fulvia HF	7099 pts
4º TAP Rallye de Portugal; 1970	12 stages 205.50 km	2	(Italy) Sandro Munari (Italy) Arnaldo Bernacchini	(Italy) Lancia Fulvia HF 1600	7486 pts
4º TAP Rallye de Portugal; 1970	12 stages 205.50 km	3	(Sweden) Björn Waldegård (Sweden) Hans Thorszelius	(Germany) Porsche 911 S	7929 pts
5º TAP Rallye de Portugal; 7 to 10 October 1971	20 stages 304.50 km	1	(France) Jean-Pierre Nicolas (France) Jean Todt	(France) Alpine Renault A110	19249 pts
5º TAP Rallye de Portugal; 7 to 10 October 1971	20 stages 304.50 km	2	(Finland) Simo Lampinen (United Kingdom) John Davenport	(Italy) Lancia Fulvia HF 1600	20664 pts
5º TAP Rallye de Portugal; 7 to 10 October 1971	20 stages 304.50 km	3	(France) Robert Neyret (France) Jacques Terramorsi	(France) Alpine Renault A110 1600	23630 pts
6º TAP Rallye de Portugal; 11 to 15 October 1972	31 stages 389.60 km	1	(West Germany) Achim Warmbold (United Kingdom) John Davenport	(Germany) BMW 2002 TI	5h 51m 03s
6º TAP Rallye de Portugal; 11 to 15 October 1972	31 stages 389.60 km	2	(France) Bernard Darniche (France) Alan Mahe	(France) Alpine Renault A110 1800	6h 00m 05s
6º TAP Rallye de Portugal; 11 to 15 October 1972	31 stages 389.60 km	3	(Sweden) Björn Waldegård (Sweden) Hans Thorszelius	(France) Citroën SM Proto	6h 08m 54s
7º TAP Rallye de Portugal; 13 to 18 March 1973; Round 3 of the 1973 World Rally Championship	32 stages 387 km	1	(France) Jean-Luc Thérier (France) Jacques Jaubert	(France) Alpine Renault (France) Alpine Renault A110 1800	5h 42m 16s
7º TAP Rallye de Portugal; 13 to 18 March 1973; Round 3 of the 1973 World Rally Championship	32 stages 387 km	2	(France) Jean-Pierre Nicolas (France) Michel Vial	(France) Alpine Renault (France) Alpine Renault A110 1800	5h 48m 16s
7º TAP Rallye de Portugal; 13 to 18 March 1973; Round 3 of the 1973 World Rally Championship	32 stages 387 km	3	(Portugal) Francisco Romãozinho (Portugal) José Bernardo	(France) Citroën Competition (France) Citroën DS 21	6h 7m 48s
8º TAP Rallye de Portugal; 20 to 23 March 1974; Round 1 of the 1974 World Rally Championship	455 km	1	(Italy) Raffaele Pinto (Italy) Arnaldo Bernacchini	(Italy) Fiat Abarth 124 Rallye	6h 26m 15s
8º TAP Rallye de Portugal; 20 to 23 March 1974; Round 1 of the 1974 World Rally Championship	455 km	2	(Italy) Alcide Paganelli (Italy) Nini Russo	(Italy) Fiat Abarth 124 Rallye	6h 30m 12s
8º TAP Rallye de Portugal; 20 to 23 March 1974; Round 1 of the 1974 World Rally Championship	455 km	3	(Finland) Markku Alén (Finland) Ilkka Kivimäki	(Italy) Fiat Abarth 124 Rallye	6h 37m 17s
9º Rallye de Portugal Vinho do Porto; 18 to 21 July 1975; Round 6 of the 1975 World Rally Championship	512 km	1	(Finland) Markku Alén (Finland) Ilkka Kivimäki	(Italy) Fiat Abarth 124 Rallye	6h 24m 15s
9º Rallye de Portugal Vinho do Porto; 18 to 21 July 1975; Round 6 of the 1975 World Rally Championship	512 km	2	(Finland) Hannu Mikkola (France) Jean Todt	(Italy) Fiat Abarth 124 Rallye	6h 26m 58s
9º Rallye de Portugal Vinho do Porto; 18 to 21 July 1975; Round 6 of the 1975 World Rally Championship	512 km	3	(Sweden) Ove Andersson (Sweden) Arne Hertz	(Germany) Toyota Team Europe (Japan) Toyota Corolla	6h 29m 29s
10º Rallye de Portugal Vinho do Porto; 10 to 14 March 1976; Round 3 of the 1976 World Rally Championship	470 km	1	(Italy) Sandro Munari (Italy) Silvio Maiga	(Italy) Lancia Stratos HF	5h 41m 26s
10º Rallye de Portugal Vinho do Porto; 10 to 14 March 1976; Round 3 of the 1976 World Rally Championship	470 km	2	(Sweden) Ove Andersson (Sweden) Arne Hertz	(Germany) Toyota Team Europe (Japan) Toyota Celica 2000GT	5h 44m 24s
10º Rallye de Portugal Vinho do Porto; 10 to 14 March 1976; Round 3 of the 1976 World Rally Championship	470 km	3	(Portugal) "Mêquêpê" (Portugal) João Batista	(Germany) Opel Kadett GT/E	6h 26m 37s
11º Rallye de Portugal Vinho do Porto; 1 to 6 March 1977; Round 3 of the 1977 World Rally Championship; Round 4 of the 1977 FIA Cup for Rally Drivers	580 km	1	(Finland) Markku Alén (Finland) Ilkka Kivimäki	(Italy) Fiat 131 Abarth	6h 51m 47s
11º Rallye de Portugal Vinho do Porto; 1 to 6 March 1977; Round 3 of the 1977 World Rally Championship; Round 4 of the 1977 FIA Cup for Rally Drivers	580 km	2	(Sweden) Björn Waldegård (Sweden) Hans Thorszelius	(United Kingdom) Ford Escort RS1800	6h 55m 43s
11º Rallye de Portugal Vinho do Porto; 1 to 6 March 1977; Round 3 of the 1977 World Rally Championship; Round 4 of the 1977 FIA Cup for Rally Drivers	580 km	3	(Sweden) Ove Andersson (United Kingdom) Henry Liddon	(Germany) Toyota Team Europe (Japan) Toyota Celica 2000GT	6h 56m 8s
12º Rallye de Portugal Vinho do Porto; 19 to 23 April 1978; Round 4 of the 1978 World Rally Championship; Round 5 of the 1978 FIA Cup for Rally Drivers	46 stages 627 km	1	(Finland) Markku Alén (Finland) Ilkka Kivimäki	(Italy) Fiat 131 Abarth	7h 45m 33s
12º Rallye de Portugal Vinho do Porto; 19 to 23 April 1978; Round 4 of the 1978 World Rally Championship; Round 5 of the 1978 FIA Cup for Rally Drivers	46 stages 627 km	2	(Finland) Hannu Mikkola (Sweden) Arne Hertz	(United Kingdom) Ford Escort RS1800	7h 50m 1s
12º Rallye de Portugal Vinho do Porto; 19 to 23 April 1978; Round 4 of the 1978 World Rally Championship; Round 5 of the 1978 FIA Cup for Rally Drivers	46 stages 627 km	3	(France) Jean-Pierre Nicolas (France) Vincent Laverne	(United Kingdom) Ford Escort RS1800	8h 1m 1s
13º Rallye de Portugal Vinho do Porto; 6 to 11 March 1979; Round 3 of the 1979 World Rally Championship	45 stages 735 km	1	(Finland) Hannu Mikkola (Sweden) Arne Hertz	(United States) Ford Motor Company (United Kingdom) Ford Escort RS1800	9h 13m 52s
13º Rallye de Portugal Vinho do Porto; 6 to 11 March 1979; Round 3 of the 1979 World Rally Championship	45 stages 735 km	2	(Sweden) Björn Waldegård (Sweden) Hans Thorszelius	(United States) Ford Motor Company (United Kingdom) Ford Escort RS1800	9h 16m 36s
13º Rallye de Portugal Vinho do Porto; 6 to 11 March 1979; Round 3 of the 1979 World Rally Championship	45 stages 735 km	3	(Sweden) Ove Andersson (United Kingdom) Henry Liddon	(Germany) Toyota Team Europe (Japan) Toyota Celica 2000GT	9h 35m 0s
14º Rallye de Portugal Vinho do Porto; 4 to 9 March 1980; Round 3 of the 1980 World Rally Championship	47 stages 673.5 km	1	(West Germany) Walter Röhrl (West Germany) Christian Geistdörfer	(Italy) Fiat Italia (Italy) Fiat 131 Abarth	9h 13m 52s
14º Rallye de Portugal Vinho do Porto; 4 to 9 March 1980; Round 3 of the 1980 World Rally Championship	47 stages 673.5 km	2	(Finland) Markku Alén (Finland) Ilkka Kivimäki	(Italy) Fiat Italia (Italy) Fiat 131 Abarth	9h 16m 36s
14º Rallye de Portugal Vinho do Porto; 4 to 9 March 1980; Round 3 of the 1980 World Rally Championship	47 stages 673.5 km	3	(France) Guy Fréquelin (France) Jean Todt	(United Kingdom) Talbot Cars GB (United Kingdom) Talbot Sunbeam Lotus	9h 35m 0s
15º Rallye de Portugal Vinho do Porto; 4 to 7 March 1981; Round 3 of the 1981 World Rally Championship	46 stages 681 km	1	(Finland) Markku Alén (Finland) Ilkka Kivimäki	(Italy) Fiat Auto Torino (Italy) Fiat 131 Abarth	8h 27m 26s
15º Rallye de Portugal Vinho do Porto; 4 to 7 March 1981; Round 3 of the 1981 World Rally Championship	46 stages 681 km	2	(Finland) Henri Toivonen (United Kingdom) Fred Gallagher	(United Kingdom) Talbot (United Kingdom) Talbot Sunbeam Lotus	8h 36m 36s
15º Rallye de Portugal Vinho do Porto; 4 to 7 March 1981; Round 3 of the 1981 World Rally Championship	46 stages 681 km	3	(Sweden) Björn Waldegård (Sweden) Hans Thorszelius	(Germany) Toyota Team Europe (Japan) Toyota Celica 2000GT	8h 43m 47s
16º Rallye de Portugal Vinho do Porto; 3 to 6 March 1982; Round 3 of the 1982 World Rally Championship	40 stages 639 km	1	(France) Michèle Mouton (Italy) Fabrizia Pons	(Germany) Audi Sport (Germany) Audi Quattro	7h 39m 36s
16º Rallye de Portugal Vinho do Porto; 3 to 6 March 1982; Round 3 of the 1982 World Rally Championship	40 stages 639 km	2	(Sweden) Per Eklund (Sweden) Ragnar Spjuth	(Germany) Toyota Team Europe (Japan) Toyota Celica 2000GT	7h 52m 43s
16º Rallye de Portugal Vinho do Porto; 3 to 6 March 1982; Round 3 of the 1982 World Rally Championship	40 stages 639 km	3	(Austria) Franz Wittmann (West Germany) Peter Diekmann	(Germany) Audi Sport (Germany) Audi Quattro	8h 7m 25s
17º Rallye de Portugal Vinho do Porto; 2 to 5 March 1983; Round 3 of the 1983 World Rally Championship	40 stages 642 km	1	(Finland) Hannu Mikkola (Sweden) Arne Hertz	(Germany) Audi Sport (Germany) Audi Quattro A1	7h 17m 24s
17º Rallye de Portugal Vinho do Porto; 2 to 5 March 1983; Round 3 of the 1983 World Rally Championship	40 stages 642 km	2	(France) Michèle Mouton (Italy) Fabrizia Pons	(Germany) Audi Sport (Germany) Audi Quattro A1	7h 18m 19s
17º Rallye de Portugal Vinho do Porto; 2 to 5 March 1983; Round 3 of the 1983 World Rally Championship	40 stages 642 km	3	(West Germany) Walter Röhrl (West Germany) Christian Geistdörfer	(Italy) Martini Racing (Italy) Lancia Rally 037	7h 19m 14s
18º Rallye de Portugal Vinho do Porto; 6 to 11 March 1984; Round 3 of the 1984 World Rally Championship	45 stages 684 km	1	(Finland) Hannu Mikkola (Sweden) Arne Hertz	(Germany) Audi Sport (Germany) Audi Quattro A2	7h 35m 32s
18º Rallye de Portugal Vinho do Porto; 6 to 11 March 1984; Round 3 of the 1984 World Rally Championship	45 stages 684 km	2	(Finland) Markku Alén (Finland) Ilkka Kivimäki	(Italy) Martini Racing (Italy) Lancia Rally 037	7h 35m 59s
18º Rallye de Portugal Vinho do Porto; 6 to 11 March 1984; Round 3 of the 1984 World Rally Championship	45 stages 684 km	3	(Italy) Attilio Bettega (Italy) Maurizio Perissinot	(Italy) Martini Racing (Italy) Lancia Rally 037	7h 58m 21s
19º Rallye de Portugal Vinho do Porto; 6 to 9 March 1985; Round 3 of the 1985 World Rally Championship	47 stages 733 km	1	(Finland) Timo Salonen (Finland) Seppo Harjanne	(France) Peugeot Talbot Sport (France) Peugeot 205 Turbo 16	8h 7m 25s
19º Rallye de Portugal Vinho do Porto; 6 to 9 March 1985; Round 3 of the 1985 World Rally Championship	47 stages 733 km	2	(Italy) Miki Biasion (Italy) Tiziano Siviero	(Italy) Jolly Club (Italy) Lancia Rally 037	8h 12m 12s
19º Rallye de Portugal Vinho do Porto; 6 to 9 March 1985; Round 3 of the 1985 World Rally Championship	47 stages 733 km	3	(West Germany) Walter Röhrl (West Germany) Christian Geistdörfer	(Germany) Audi Sport (Germany) Audi Sport Quattro	8h 13m 23s
20º Rallye de Portugal Vinho do Porto; 5 to 8 March 1986; Round 3 of the 1986 World Rally Championship	42 stages 660 km	1	(Portugal) Joaquim Moutinho (Portugal) Edgar Fortes	(Portugal) Renault Galp (France) Renault 5 Turbo	7h 50m 44s
20º Rallye de Portugal Vinho do Porto; 5 to 8 March 1986; Round 3 of the 1986 World Rally Championship	42 stages 660 km	2	(Portugal) Carlos Bica (Portugal) Cândido Júnior	(Portugal) Duriforte Construções (Italy) Lancia Rally 037	8h 4m 11s
20º Rallye de Portugal Vinho do Porto; 5 to 8 March 1986; Round 3 of the 1986 World Rally Championship	42 stages 660 km	3	(Italy) Giovanni Del Zoppo (Italy) Loris Roggia	(Italy) Jolly Club (Italy) Fiat Uno Turbo	8h 7m 36s
21º Rallye de Portugal Vinho do Porto; 11 to 14 March 1987; Round 3 of the 1987 World Rally Championship	37 stages 597.67 km	1	(Finland) Markku Alén (Finland) Ilkka Kivimäki	(Italy) Martini Lancia (Italy) Lancia Delta HF 4WD	7h 9m 39s
21º Rallye de Portugal Vinho do Porto; 11 to 14 March 1987; Round 3 of the 1987 World Rally Championship	37 stages 597.67 km	2	(France) Jean Ragnotti (France) Perre Thimonier	(France) Renault Sport Elf (France) Renault 11 Turbo	7h 12m 32s
21º Rallye de Portugal Vinho do Porto; 11 to 14 March 1987; Round 3 of the 1987 World Rally Championship	37 stages 597.67 km	3	(Sweden) Kenneth Eriksson (West Germany) Peter Diekmann	(Germany) Volkswagen Motorsport (Germany) Volkswagen Golf GTI 16V	7h 14m 37s
22º Rallye de Portugal Vinho do Porto; 1 to 6 March 1988; Round 3 of the 1988 World Rally Championship	37 stages 589.89 km	1	(Italy) Miki Biasion (Italy) Carlo Cassina	(Italy) Martini Lancia (Italy) Lancia Delta Integrale	6h 44m 1s
22º Rallye de Portugal Vinho do Porto; 1 to 6 March 1988; Round 3 of the 1988 World Rally Championship	37 stages 589.89 km	2	(Italy) Alex Fiorio (Italy) Luigi Pirollo	(Italy) Jolly Club (Italy) Lancia Delta HF 4WD	6h 52m 47s
22º Rallye de Portugal Vinho do Porto; 1 to 6 March 1988; Round 3 of the 1988 World Rally Championship	37 stages 589.89 km	3	(France) Yves Loubet (France) Jean-Bernard Vieu	(Italy) Jolly Club (Italy) Lancia Delta HF 4WD	6h 53m 23s
23º Rallye de Portugal Vinho do Porto; 28 February to 4 March 1989; Round 3 of the 1989 World Rally Championship	37 stages 576.88 km	1	(Italy) Miki Biasion (Italy) Tiziano Siviero	(Italy) Martini Lancia (Italy) Lancia Delta Integrale	6h 47m 1s
23º Rallye de Portugal Vinho do Porto; 28 February to 4 March 1989; Round 3 of the 1989 World Rally Championship	37 stages 576.88 km	2	(Finland) Markku Alén (Finland) Ilkka Kivimäki	(Italy) Martini Lancia (Italy) Lancia Delta Integrale	6h 57m 19s
23º Rallye de Portugal Vinho do Porto; 28 February to 4 March 1989; Round 3 of the 1989 World Rally Championship	37 stages 576.88 km	3	(Italy) Alex Fiorio (Italy) Luigi Pirollo	(Italy) Jolly Club (Italy) Lancia Delta Integrale	7h 10m 19s
24º Rallye de Portugal Vinho do Porto; 6 to 10 March 1990; Round 2 of the 1990 World Rally Championship	38 stages 544.2 km	1	(Italy) Miki Biasion (Italy) Tiziano Siviero	(Italy) Martini Lancia (Italy) Lancia Delta Integrale 16V	6h 17m 57s
24º Rallye de Portugal Vinho do Porto; 6 to 10 March 1990; Round 2 of the 1990 World Rally Championship	38 stages 544.2 km	2	(France) Didier Auriol (France) Bernard Occelli	(Italy) Martini Lancia (Italy) Lancia Delta Integrale 16V	6h 20m 33s
24º Rallye de Portugal Vinho do Porto; 6 to 10 March 1990; Round 2 of the 1990 World Rally Championship	38 stages 544.2 km	3	(Finland) Juha Kankkunen (Finland) Juha Piironen	(Italy) Martini Lancia (Italy) Lancia Delta Integrale 16V	6h 23m 8s
25º Rallye de Portugal; 5 to 9 March 1991; Round 3 of the 1991 World Rally Championship	36 stages 524.75 km	1	(Spain) Carlos Sainz Sr. (Spain) Luis Moya	(Germany) Toyota Team Europe (Japan) Toyota Celica GT-Four	6h 6m 36s
25º Rallye de Portugal; 5 to 9 March 1991; Round 3 of the 1991 World Rally Championship	36 stages 524.75 km	2	(France) Didier Auriol (France) Bernard Occelli	(Italy) Jolly Club (Italy) Lancia Delta Integrale 16V	6h 7m 23s
25º Rallye de Portugal; 5 to 9 March 1991; Round 3 of the 1991 World Rally Championship	36 stages 524.75 km	3	(Italy) Miki Biasion (Italy) Tiziano Siviero	(Italy) Martini Lancia (Italy) Lancia Delta Integrale 16V	6h 8m 41s
26º Rallye de Portugal; 3 to 7 March 1992; Round 3 of the 1992 World Rally Championship	40 stages 577.38 km	1	(Finland) Juha Kankkunen (Finland) Juha Piironen	(Italy) Martini Lancia (Italy) Lancia Delta HF Integrale	6h 24m 37s
26º Rallye de Portugal; 3 to 7 March 1992; Round 3 of the 1992 World Rally Championship	40 stages 577.38 km	2	(Italy) Miki Biasion (Italy) Tiziano Siviero	(United States) Ford Motor Company (United Kingdom) Ford Sierra RS Cosworth 4x4	6h 26m 10s
26º Rallye de Portugal; 3 to 7 March 1992; Round 3 of the 1992 World Rally Championship	40 stages 577.38 km	3	(Spain) Carlos Sainz Sr. (Spain) Luis Moya	(Germany) Toyota Team Europe (Japan) Toyota Celica Turbo 4WD	6h 29m 36s
27º Rallye de Portugal; 3 to 6 March 1993; Round 3 of the 1993 World Rally Championship	37 stages 562 km	1	(France) François Delecour (France) Daniel Grataloup	(United States) Ford Motor Company (United Kingdom) Ford Escort RS Cosworth	6h 20m 37s
27º Rallye de Portugal; 3 to 6 March 1993; Round 3 of the 1993 World Rally Championship	37 stages 562 km	2	(Italy) Miki Biasion (Italy) Tiziano Siviero	(United States) Ford Motor Company (United Kingdom) Ford Escort RS Cosworth	6h 21m 32s
27º Rallye de Portugal; 3 to 6 March 1993; Round 3 of the 1993 World Rally Championship	37 stages 562 km	3	(Italy) Andrea Aghini (Italy) Sauro Farnocchia	(Italy) Jolly Club (Italy) Lancia Delta HF Integrale	6h 23m 17s
28º TAP Rallye de Portugal; 1 to 4 March 1994; Round 2 of the 1994 World Rally Championship; Round 2 of the 1994 FIA 2-Litre World Cup for Manufacturers	36 stages 571.82 km	1	(Finland) Juha Kankkunen (United Kingdom) Nicky Grist	(Japan) Toyota Castrol Team (Japan) Toyota Celica Turbo 4WD	6h 20m 59s
28º TAP Rallye de Portugal; 1 to 4 March 1994; Round 2 of the 1994 World Rally Championship; Round 2 of the 1994 FIA 2-Litre World Cup for Manufacturers	36 stages 571.82 km	2	(France) Didier Auriol (France) Bernard Occelli	(Japan) Toyota Castrol Team (Japan) Toyota Celica Turbo 4WD	6h 21m 39s
28º TAP Rallye de Portugal; 1 to 4 March 1994; Round 2 of the 1994 World Rally Championship; Round 2 of the 1994 FIA 2-Litre World Cup for Manufacturers	36 stages 571.82 km	3	(Italy) Miki Biasion (Italy) Tiziano Siviero	(United States) Ford Motor Company (United Kingdom) Ford Escort RS Cosworth	6h 21m 49s
29º TAP Rallye de Portugal; 8 to 10 March 1995; Round 3 of the 1995 World Rally Championship; Round 3 of the 1995 FIA 2-Litre World Cup for Manufacturers	33 stages 467 km	1	(Spain) Carlos Sainz Sr. (Spain) Luis Moya	(Japan) 555 Subaru World Rally Team (Japan) Subaru Impreza 555	5h 32m 37s
29º TAP Rallye de Portugal; 8 to 10 March 1995; Round 3 of the 1995 World Rally Championship; Round 3 of the 1995 FIA 2-Litre World Cup for Manufacturers	33 stages 467 km	2	(Finland) Juha Kankkunen (United Kingdom) Nicky Grist	(Japan) Toyota Castrol Team (Japan) Toyota Celica GT-Four	5h 32m 49s
29º TAP Rallye de Portugal; 8 to 10 March 1995; Round 3 of the 1995 World Rally Championship; Round 3 of the 1995 FIA 2-Litre World Cup for Manufacturers	33 stages 467 km	3	(United Kingdom) Colin McRae (United Kingdom) Derek Ringer	(Japan) 555 Subaru World Rally Team (Japan) Subaru Impreza 555	5h 35m 51s
30º TAP Rallye de Portugal; 6 to 8 March 1996; Round 2 of the 1996 FIA 2-Litre World Championship for Manufacturers	34 stages 425.24 km	1	(Portugal) Rui Madeira (Portugal) Nuno Rodrigues da Silva	(Italy) HF Grifone (Japan) Toyota Celica GT-Four	5h 13m 28s
30º TAP Rallye de Portugal; 6 to 8 March 1996; Round 2 of the 1996 FIA 2-Litre World Championship for Manufacturers	34 stages 425.24 km	2	(Belgium) Freddy Loix (Belgium) Sven Smeets	(Italy) HF Grifone (Japan) Toyota Celica GT-Four	5h 15m 15s
30º TAP Rallye de Portugal; 6 to 8 March 1996; Round 2 of the 1996 FIA 2-Litre World Championship for Manufacturers	34 stages 425.24 km	3	(Portugal) José Miguel (Portugal) Carlos Magalhães	(Portugal) Privateer (United Kingdom) Ford Escort RS Cosworth	5h 23m 22s
31º TAP Rallye de Portugal; 23 to 26 March 1997; Round 4 of the 1997 World Rally Championship	31 stages 419.78 km	1	(Finland) Tommi Mäkinen (Finland) Seppo Harjanne	(Japan) Team Mitsubishi Ralliart (Japan) Mitsubishi Lancer Evolution IV	4h 53m 1s
31º TAP Rallye de Portugal; 23 to 26 March 1997; Round 4 of the 1997 World Rally Championship	31 stages 419.78 km	2	(Belgium) Freddy Loix (Belgium) Sven Smeets	Marlboro Toyota Castrol Team Belgium (Japan) Toyota Celica GT-Four	4h 57m 6s
31º TAP Rallye de Portugal; 23 to 26 March 1997; Round 4 of the 1997 World Rally Championship	31 stages 419.78 km	3	(Germany) Armin Schwarz (France) Denis Giraudet	(United States) Ford Motor Company (United Kingdom) Ford Escort WRC	4h 59m 34s
32º TAP Rallye de Portugal; 22 to 25 March 1998; Round 4 of the 1998 World Rally Championship	28 stages 380.18 km	1	(United Kingdom) Colin McRae (United Kingdom) Nicky Grist	(Japan) 555 Subaru World Rally Team (Japan) Subaru Impreza WRC	4h 20m 58.1s
32º TAP Rallye de Portugal; 22 to 25 March 1998; Round 4 of the 1998 World Rally Championship	28 stages 380.18 km	2	(Spain) Carlos Sainz Sr. (Spain) Luis Moya	(Japan) Toyota Castrol Team (Japan) Toyota Corolla WRC	4h 21m 0.2s
32º TAP Rallye de Portugal; 22 to 25 March 1998; Round 4 of the 1998 World Rally Championship	28 stages 380.18 km	3	(Belgium) Freddy Loix (Belgium) Sven Smeets	Marlboro Toyota Castrol Team Belgium (Japan) Toyota Corolla WRC	4h 21m 43.9s
33º TAP Rallye de Portugal; 21 to 24 March 1999; Round 4 of the 1999 World Rally Championship	23 stages 358.85 km	1	(United Kingdom) Colin McRae (United Kingdom) Nicky Grist	(United States) Ford Motor Company (United Kingdom) Ford Focus WRC	4h 5m 41.7s
33º TAP Rallye de Portugal; 21 to 24 March 1999; Round 4 of the 1999 World Rally Championship	23 stages 358.85 km	2	(Spain) Carlos Sainz Sr. (Spain) Luis Moya	(Japan) Toyota Castrol Team (Japan) Toyota Corolla WRC	4h 5m 54.0s
33º TAP Rallye de Portugal; 21 to 24 March 1999; Round 4 of the 1999 World Rally Championship	23 stages 358.85 km	3	(France) Didier Auriol (France) Denis Giraudet	(Japan) Toyota Castrol Team (Japan) Toyota Corolla WRC	4h 5m 58.2s
34º TAP Rallye de Portugal; 16 to 19 March 2000; Round 4 of the 2000 World Rally Championship	23 stages 398.35 km	1	(United Kingdom) Richard Burns (United Kingdom) Robert Reid	(Japan) Subaru World Rally Team (Japan) Subaru Impreza WRC	4h 34m 0.0s
34º TAP Rallye de Portugal; 16 to 19 March 2000; Round 4 of the 2000 World Rally Championship	23 stages 398.35 km	2	(Finland) Marcus Grönholm (Finland) Timo Rautiainen	(France) Peugeot Esso Sport (France) Peugeot 206 WRC	4h 34m 6.5s
34º TAP Rallye de Portugal; 16 to 19 March 2000; Round 4 of the 2000 World Rally Championship	23 stages 398.35 km	3	(Spain) Carlos Sainz Sr. (Spain) Luis Moya	(United States) Ford Motor Company (United Kingdom) Ford Focus RS WRC	4h 36m 9.2s
35º TAP Rallye de Portugal; 8 to 11 March 2001; Round 3 of the 2001 World Rally Championship	22 stages 390.14 km	1	(Finland) Tommi Mäkinen (Finland) Risto Mannisenmaki	(Japan) Marlboro Mitsubishi Ralliart (Japan) Mitsubishi Lancer Evolution VI	3h 46m 42.1s
35º TAP Rallye de Portugal; 8 to 11 March 2001; Round 3 of the 2001 World Rally Championship	22 stages 390.14 km	2	(Spain) Carlos Sainz Sr. (Spain) Luis Moya	(United States) Ford Motor Company (United Kingdom) Ford Focus RS WRC 01	3h 46m 50.7s
35º TAP Rallye de Portugal; 8 to 11 March 2001; Round 3 of the 2001 World Rally Championship	22 stages 390.14 km	3	(Finland) Marcus Grönholm (Finland) Timo Rautiainen	(France) Peugeot Total (France) Peugeot 206 WRC	3h 49m 37.7s

=== 2002–2006 ===
Rally out of World Rally Championship

Rally name	Stages	Podium finishers			
Rally name	Stages	Rank	Driver co-driver	Team Car	Time
36º TMN Rallye de Portugal; 7 to 8 June 2002	8 stages 152.77 km	1	(France) Didier Auriol (France) Thierry Barjou	(Japan) Toyota Corolla WRC	1h 41m 25.5s
36º TMN Rallye de Portugal; 7 to 8 June 2002	8 stages 152.77 km	2	(Italy) Andrea Aghini (Italy) Loris Roggia	(Italy) Procar Srl (Japan) Subaru Impreza WRC P2000	1h 43m 59.9s
36º TMN Rallye de Portugal; 7 to 8 June 2002	8 stages 152.77 km	3	(Portugal) Miguel Campos (Portugal) Carlos Magalhães	(Portugal) Peugeot Total Silver Team SG (France) Peugeot 206 WRC	1h 44m 35.9s
37º TMN Rallye de Portugal; 28 to 29 March 2003	9 stages 164.97 km	1	(Portugal) Armindo Araújo (Portugal) Miguel Ramalho	(France) Citroën Saxo Kit Car	2h 04m 12.7s
37º TMN Rallye de Portugal; 28 to 29 March 2003	9 stages 164.97 km	2	(Portugal) Pedro Leal (Portugal) Luis Ramalho	(Japan) Mitsubishi Lancer Evo VI	2h 05m 57.9s
37º TMN Rallye de Portugal; 28 to 29 March 2003	9 stages 164.97 km	3	(Portugal) Pedro Dias da Silva (Portugal) Mário Castro	(Portugal) Interpass Competição (France) Citroën Saxo S1600	2h 09m 07.1s
38º TMN Rallye de Portugal; 2004	8 stages 151.82 km	1	(Portugal) Armindo Araújo (Portugal) Miguel Ramalho	(France) Citroën Saxo Kit Car	1h 54m 49.1s
38º TMN Rallye de Portugal; 2004	8 stages 151.82 km	2	(Portugal) Pedro Leal (Portugal) Luis Ramalho	(Japan) Subaru Impreza WRX	1h 55m 31.7s
38º TMN Rallye de Portugal; 2004	8 stages 151.82 km	3	(Portugal) Fernando Peres (Portugal) José Pedro Silva	(Japan) Mitsubishi Lancer Evo VII	2h 00m 33.9s
39º TMN Rallye de Portugal; 31 March to 2 April 2005	12 stages 237.66 km	1	(Sweden) Daniel Carlsson (Sweden) Mattias Andersson	(Japan) Subaru Impreza WRX	2h 44m 54.0s
39º TMN Rallye de Portugal; 31 March to 2 April 2005	12 stages 237.66 km	2	(Finland) Mikko Hirvonen (Finland) Jarmo Lehtinen	(Japan) Subaru Impreza WRX	2h 46m 03.0s
39º TMN Rallye de Portugal; 31 March to 2 April 2005	12 stages 237.66 km	3	(Portugal) Armindo Araújo (Portugal) Miguel Ramalho	(Portugal) Mitsubishi Galp TMN (Japan) Mitsubishi Lancer Evo VIII	2h 47m 19.2s
40º PT-Rally de Portugal; 2006	12 stages 239.90 km	1	(Portugal) Armindo Araújo (Portugal) Miguel Ramalho	Mitsubishi Motors Portugal (Japan) Mitsubishi Lancer Evo VIII MR	3h 06m 14.0s
40º PT-Rally de Portugal; 2006	12 stages 239.90 km	2	(Finland) Janne Tuohino (Finland) Mikko Markkula	(Japan) Subaru Impreza N11	3h 07m 31.0s
40º PT-Rally de Portugal; 2006	12 stages 239.90 km	3	(Sweden) Patrik Flodin (Sweden) Maria Andersson	(Japan) Subaru Impreza N12	3h 07m 49.6s

=== 2007–2014 ===
Rally back to World Rally Championship, but held in Algarve

Rally name	Stages	Podium finishers			
Rally name	Stages	Rank	Driver co-driver	Team Car	Time
41º Vodafone Rally de Portugal; 30 March to 1 April 2007; Round 5 of the 2007 World Rally Championship	18 stages 357.1 km	1	(France) Sébastien Loeb (Monaco) Daniel Elena	(France) Citroën Total World Rally Team (France) Citroën C4 WRC	3h 53m 33.1s
41º Vodafone Rally de Portugal; 30 March to 1 April 2007; Round 5 of the 2007 World Rally Championship	18 stages 357.1 km	2	(Norway) Petter Solberg (United Kingdom) Phil Mills	(United Kingdom) Subaru World Rally Team (Japan) Subaru Impreza WRC S12b	3h 56m 47.0s
41º Vodafone Rally de Portugal; 30 March to 1 April 2007; Round 5 of the 2007 World Rally Championship	18 stages 357.1 km	3	(Spain) Dani Sordo (Spain) Marc Marti	(France) Citroën Total World Rally Team (France) Citroën C4 WRC	3h 58m 38.4s
42º Vodafone Rally de Portugal; 2008; Round of the 2008 Intercontinental Rally Challenge	13 stages 249.74 km	1	(Italy) Luca Rossetti (Italy) Matteo Chiarcossi	(Italy) Racing Lions SRL (France) Peugeot 207 S2000	2h 57m 50.1s
42º Vodafone Rally de Portugal; 2008; Round of the 2008 Intercontinental Rally Challenge	13 stages 249.74 km	2	(Czech Republic) Jan Kopecky (Czech Republic) Petr Stary	(Czech Republic) Champion Racing (France) Peugeot 207 S2000	2h 58m 35.9s
42º Vodafone Rally de Portugal; 2008; Round of the 2008 Intercontinental Rally Challenge	13 stages 249.74 km	3	(France) Nicolas Vouilloz (France) Nicolas Klinger	(Belgium) Peugeot Team Belux (France) Peugeot 207 S2000	2h 59m 27.9s
43º Vodafone Rally de Portugal; 2009; Round 6 of the 2009 World Rally Championship	18 stages 361.36 km	1	(France) Sébastien Loeb (Monaco) Daniel Elena	(France) Citroën Total World Rally Team (France) Citroën C4 WRC 09	3h 53m 13.1s
43º Vodafone Rally de Portugal; 2009; Round 6 of the 2009 World Rally Championship	18 stages 361.36 km	2	(Finland) Mikko Hirvonen (Finland) Jarmo Lehtinen	(United Kingdom) BP Ford Abu Dhabi World Rally Team (United Kingdom) Ford Focus WRC 09	3h 53m 37.4s
43º Vodafone Rally de Portugal; 2009; Round 6 of the 2009 World Rally Championship	18 stages 361.36 km	3	(Spain) Dani Sordo (Spain) Marc Marti	(France) Citroën Total World Rally Team (France) Citroën C4 WRC 09	3h 54m 58.5s
44º Vodafone Rally de Portugal; 2010; Round 6 of the 2010 World Rally Championship	18 stages 355.32 km	1	(France) Sébastien Ogier (France) Julien Ingrassia	(France) Citroën Junior Team (France) Citroën C4 WRC 09	3h 51m 16.1s
44º Vodafone Rally de Portugal; 2010; Round 6 of the 2010 World Rally Championship	18 stages 355.32 km	2	(France) Sébastien Loeb (Monaco) Daniel Elena	(France) Citroën Total World Rally Team (France) Citroën C4 WRC 09	3h 51m 24.0s
44º Vodafone Rally de Portugal; 2010; Round 6 of the 2010 World Rally Championship	18 stages 355.32 km	3	(Spain) Dani Sordo (Spain) Marc Marti	(France) Citroën Total World Rally Team (France) Citroën C4 WRC 09	3h 52m 33.7s
45º Vodafone Rally de Portugal; 2011; Round 3 of the 2011 World Rally Championship	17 stages 385.37 km	1	(France) Sébastien Ogier (France) Julien Ingrassia	(France) Citroën Total World Rally Team (France) Citroën DS3 WRC	4h 10m 53.4s
45º Vodafone Rally de Portugal; 2011; Round 3 of the 2011 World Rally Championship	17 stages 385.37 km	2	(France) Sébastien Loeb (Monaco) Daniel Elena	(France) Citroën Total World Rally Team (France) Citroën DS3 WRC	4h 11m 25.2s
45º Vodafone Rally de Portugal; 2011; Round 3 of the 2011 World Rally Championship	17 stages 385.37 km	3	(Finland) Jari-Matti Latvala (Finland) Miikka Anttila	(United Kingdom) BP Ford Abu Dhabi World Rally Team (United Kingdom) Ford Fiesta RS WRC	4h 14m 15.5s
46º Vodafone Rally de Portugal; 2012; Round 4 of the 2012 World Rally Championship	22 (19)^{†} stages 434.77 (368.43)^{†} km	1	(Norway) Mads Ostberg (Sweden) Jonas Andersson	(Norway) Adapta World Rally Team (United Kingdom) Ford Fiesta RS WRC	4h 21m 16.1s
46º Vodafone Rally de Portugal; 2012; Round 4 of the 2012 World Rally Championship	22 (19)^{†} stages 434.77 (368.43)^{†} km	2	(Russia) Evgeny Novikov (France) Denis Giraudet	(United Kingdom) M-Sport Ford World Rally Team (United Kingdom) Ford Fiesta RS WRC	4h 22m 49.3s
46º Vodafone Rally de Portugal; 2012; Round 4 of the 2012 World Rally Championship	22 (19)^{†} stages 434.77 (368.43)^{†} km	3	(Norway) Petter Solberg (United Kingdom) Chris Patterson	(United Kingdom) Ford World Rally Team (United Kingdom) Ford Fiesta RS WRC	4h 23m 11.7s
47º Vodafone Rally de Portugal; 2013; Round 4 of the 2013 World Rally Championship	23 stages 396.82 km	1	(France) Sébastien Ogier (France) Julien Ingrassia	(Germany) Volkswagen Motorsport (Germany) Volkswagen Polo R WRC	4h 07m 38.7s
47º Vodafone Rally de Portugal; 2013; Round 4 of the 2013 World Rally Championship	23 stages 396.82 km	2	(Finland) Mikko Hirvonen (Finland) Jarmo Lehtinen	(France) Citroën Total Abu Dhabi WRT (France) Citroën DS3 WRC	4h 08m 36.9s
47º Vodafone Rally de Portugal; 2013; Round 4 of the 2013 World Rally Championship	23 stages 396.82 km	3	(Finland) Jari-Matti Latvala (Finland) Miikka Anttila	(Germany) Volkswagen Motorsport (Germany) Volkswagen Polo R WRC	4h 11m 43.2s
48º Vodafone Rally de Portugal; 2014; Round 4 of the 2014 World Rally Championship	16 stages 339.46 km	1	(France) Sébastien Ogier (France) Julien Ingrassia	(Germany) Volkswagen Motorsport (Germany) Volkswagen Polo R WRC	3h 33m 20.4s
48º Vodafone Rally de Portugal; 2014; Round 4 of the 2014 World Rally Championship	16 stages 339.46 km	2	(Finland) Mikko Hirvonen (Finland) Jarmo Lehtinen	(United Kingdom) M-Sport WRT (United Kingdom) Ford Fiesta RS WRC	3h 34m 03.6s
48º Vodafone Rally de Portugal; 2014; Round 4 of the 2014 World Rally Championship	16 stages 339.46 km	3	(Norway) Mads Østberg (Sweden) Jonas Andersson	(France) Citroën Total Abu Dhabi WRT (France) Citroën DS3 WRC	3h 34m 32.8s

=== 2015– ===
Rally back to its roots: North of Portugal

Rally name	Stages	Podium finishers			
Rally name	Stages	Rank	Driver co-driver	Team Car	Time
49º Vodafone Rally de Portugal; 2015; Round 5 of the 2015 World Rally Championship	16 (15)^{†} stages 351.71 (324.18)^{†} km	1	(Finland) Jari-Matti Latvala (Finland) Miikka Anttila	(Germany) Volkswagen Motorsport (Germany) Volkswagen Polo R WRC	3h 30m 35.3s
49º Vodafone Rally de Portugal; 2015; Round 5 of the 2015 World Rally Championship	16 (15)^{†} stages 351.71 (324.18)^{†} km	2	(France) Sébastien Ogier (France) Julien Ingrassia	(Germany) Volkswagen Motorsport (Germany) Volkswagen Polo R WRC	3h 30m 43.5s
49º Vodafone Rally de Portugal; 2015; Round 5 of the 2015 World Rally Championship	16 (15)^{†} stages 351.71 (324.18)^{†} km	3	(Norway) Andreas Mikkelsen (Norway) Ola Fløene	(Germany) Volkswagen Motorsport II (Germany) Volkswagen Polo R WRC	3h 31m 03.9s
50º Vodafone Rally de Portugal; 2016; Round 5 of the 2016 World Rally Championship	19 stages 368.00 km	1	(United Kingdom) Kris Meeke (Republic of Ireland) Paul Nagle	(France) Abu Dhabi Total World Rally Team (France) Citroën DS3 WRC	3h 59m 01.0s
50º Vodafone Rally de Portugal; 2016; Round 5 of the 2016 World Rally Championship	19 stages 368.00 km	2	(Norway) Andreas Mikkelsen (Norway) Ola Fløene	(Germany) Volkswagen Motorsport II (Germany) Volkswagen Polo R WRC	3h 59m 30.7s
50º Vodafone Rally de Portugal; 2016; Round 5 of the 2016 World Rally Championship	19 stages 368.00 km	3	(France) Sébastien Ogier (France) Julien Ingrassia	(Germany) Volkswagen Motorsport (Germany) Volkswagen Polo R WRC	3h 59m 35.5s
51º Vodafone Rally de Portugal; 2017; Round 6 of the 2017 World Rally Championship	19 stages 349.17 km	1	(France) Sébastien Ogier (France) Julien Ingrassia	(United Kingdom) M-Sport World Rally Team (United Kingdom) Ford Fiesta WRC	3h 42m 55.7s
51º Vodafone Rally de Portugal; 2017; Round 6 of the 2017 World Rally Championship	19 stages 349.17 km	2	(Belgium) Thierry Neuville (Belgium) Nicolas Gilsoul	(South Korea) Hyundai Motorsport (South Korea) Hyundai i20 Coupe WRC	3h 43m 11.3s
51º Vodafone Rally de Portugal; 2017; Round 6 of the 2017 World Rally Championship	19 stages 349.17 km	3	(Spain) Dani Sordo (Spain) Marc Martí	(South Korea) Hyundai Motorsport (South Korea) Hyundai i20 Coupe WRC	3h 43m 57.4s
52º Vodafone Rally de Portugal; 2018; Round 6 of the 2018 World Rally Championship	20 stages 358.19 km	1	(Belgium) Thierry Neuville (Belgium) Nicolas Gilsoul	(South Korea) Hyundai Shell Mobis WRT (South Korea) Hyundai i20 Coupe WRC	3h 49m 46.6s
52º Vodafone Rally de Portugal; 2018; Round 6 of the 2018 World Rally Championship	20 stages 358.19 km	2	(United Kingdom) Elfyn Evans (United Kingdom) Daniel Barritt	(United Kingdom) M-Sport Ford WRT (United Kingdom) Ford Fiesta WRC	3h 50m 26.6s
52º Vodafone Rally de Portugal; 2018; Round 6 of the 2018 World Rally Championship	20 stages 358.19 km	3	(Finland) Teemu Suninen (Finland) Mikko Markkula	(United Kingdom) M-Sport Ford WRT (United Kingdom) Ford Fiesta WRC	3h 50m 33.9s
53º Vodafone Rally de Portugal; 2019; Round 7 of the 2019 World Rally Championship	20 stages 306.97 km	1	(Estonia) Ott Tänak (Estonia) Martin Järveoja	(Japan) Toyota Gazoo Racing WRT (Japan) Toyota Yaris WRC	3h 20m 22.8s
53º Vodafone Rally de Portugal; 2019; Round 7 of the 2019 World Rally Championship	20 stages 306.97 km	2	(Belgium) Thierry Neuville (Belgium) Nicolas Gilsoul	(South Korea) Hyundai Shell Mobis WRT (South Korea) Hyundai i20 Coupe WRC	3h 20m 38.7s
53º Vodafone Rally de Portugal; 2019; Round 7 of the 2019 World Rally Championship	20 stages 306.97 km	3	(France) Sébastien Ogier (France) Julien Ingrassia	(France) Citroën Total WRT (France) Citroën C3 WRC	3h 21m 19.9s
2020 Rally de Portugal; 2020 World Rally Championship	22 stages 331.10 km	Cancelled due to COVID-19 concerns			
54º Vodafone Rally de Portugal; 2021; Round 4 of the 2021 World Rally Championship	20 stages 337.51 km	1	(United Kingdom) Elfyn Evans (United Kingdom) Scott Martin	(Japan) Toyota Gazoo Racing WRT (Japan) Toyota Yaris WRC	3h 38m 26.2s
54º Vodafone Rally de Portugal; 2021; Round 4 of the 2021 World Rally Championship	20 stages 337.51 km	2	(Spain) Dani Sordo (Spain) Borja Rozada	(South Korea) Hyundai Shell Mobis WRT (South Korea) Hyundai i20 Coupe WRC	3h 38m 54.5s
54º Vodafone Rally de Portugal; 2021; Round 4 of the 2021 World Rally Championship	20 stages 337.51 km	3	(France) Sébastien Ogier (France) Julien Ingrassia	(Japan) Toyota Gazoo Racing WRT (Japan) Toyota Yaris WRC	3h 39m 49.8s
55º Vodafone Rally de Portugal; 2022; Round 4 of the 2022 World Rally Championship	21 stages 330.17 km	1	(Finland) Kalle Rovanperä (Finland) Jonne Halttunen	(Japan) Toyota Gazoo Racing WRT (Japan) Toyota GR Yaris Rally1	3h 44m 19.2s
55º Vodafone Rally de Portugal; 2022; Round 4 of the 2022 World Rally Championship	21 stages 330.17 km	2	(United Kingdom) Elfyn Evans (United Kingdom) Scott Martin	(Japan) Toyota Gazoo Racing WRT (Japan) Toyota GR Yaris Rally1	3h 44m 34.4s
55º Vodafone Rally de Portugal; 2022; Round 4 of the 2022 World Rally Championship	21 stages 330.17 km	3	(Spain) Dani Sordo (Spain) Borja Rozada	(South Korea) Hyundai Shell Mobis WRT (South Korea) Hyundai i20 N Rally1	3h 46m 36.5s
56º Vodafone Rally de Portugal; 2023; Round 5 of the 2023 World Rally Championship	19 stages 329.06 km	1	(Finland) Kalle Rovanperä (Finland) Jonne Halttunen	(Japan) Toyota Gazoo Racing WRT (Japan) Toyota GR Yaris Rally1	3h 35m 11.7s
56º Vodafone Rally de Portugal; 2023; Round 5 of the 2023 World Rally Championship	19 stages 329.06 km	2	(Spain) Dani Sordo (Spain) Cándido Carrera	(South Korea) Hyundai Shell Mobis WRT (South Korea) Hyundai i20 N Rally1	3h 36m 06.4s
56º Vodafone Rally de Portugal; 2023; Round 5 of the 2023 World Rally Championship	19 stages 329.06 km	3	(Finland) Esapekka Lappi (Finland) Janne Ferm	(South Korea) Hyundai Shell Mobis WRT (South Korea) Hyundai i20 N Rally1	3h 36m 32.0s
57º Vodafone Rally de Portugal; 2024; Round 5 of the 2024 World Rally Championship	22 stages 337.04 km	1	(France) Sébastien Ogier (France) Vincent Landais	(Japan) Toyota Gazoo Racing WRT (Japan) Toyota GR Yaris Rally1	3h 41m 32.3s
57º Vodafone Rally de Portugal; 2024; Round 5 of the 2024 World Rally Championship	22 stages 337.04 km	2	(Estonia) Ott Tänak (Estonia) Martin Järveoja	(South Korea) Hyundai Shell Mobis WRT (South Korea) Hyundai i20 N Rally1	3h 41m 40.2s
57º Vodafone Rally de Portugal; 2024; Round 5 of the 2024 World Rally Championship	22 stages 337.04 km	3	(Belgium) Thierry Neuville (Belgium) Martijn Wydaeghe	(South Korea) Hyundai Shell Mobis WRT (South Korea) Hyundai i20 N Rally1	3h 42m 42.1s
58° Vodafone Rally de Portugal; 2025; Round 5 of the 2025 World Rally Championship	24 stages 344.50 km	1	(France) Sébastien Ogier (France) Vincent Landais	(Japan) Toyota Gazoo Racing WRT (Japan) Toyota GR Yaris Rally1	3h 48m 35.9s
58° Vodafone Rally de Portugal; 2025; Round 5 of the 2025 World Rally Championship	24 stages 344.50 km	2	(Estonia) Ott Tänak (Estonia) Martin Järveoja	(South Korea) Hyundai Shell Mobis WRT (South Korea) Hyundai i20 N Rally1	3h 48m 44.6s
58° Vodafone Rally de Portugal; 2025; Round 5 of the 2025 World Rally Championship	24 stages 344.50 km	3	(Finland) Kalle Rovanperä (Finland) Jonne Halttunen	(Japan) Toyota Gazoo Racing WRT (Japan) Toyota GR Yaris Rally1	3h 48m 48.1s
59° Vodafone Rally de Portugal; 2026; Round 6 of the 2026 World Rally Championship	23 stages 345.14 km	1	(Belgium) Thierry Neuville (Belgium) Martijn Wydaeghe	(South Korea) Hyundai Shell Mobis WRT (South Korea) Hyundai i20 N Rally1	3h 53m 01.7s
59° Vodafone Rally de Portugal; 2026; Round 6 of the 2026 World Rally Championship	23 stages 345.14 km	2	(Sweden) Oliver Solberg (United Kingdom) Elliott Edmondson	(Japan) Toyota Gazoo Racing WRT (Japan) Toyota GR Yaris Rally1	3h 53m 18.0s
59° Vodafone Rally de Portugal; 2026; Round 6 of the 2026 World Rally Championship	23 stages 345.14 km	3	(United Kingdom) Elfyn Evans (United Kingdom) Scott Martin	(Japan) Toyota Gazoo Racing WRT (Japan) Toyota GR Yaris Rally1	3h 53m 30.8s

Notes

- † – Event was shortened after stages were cancelled.

== Multiple winners ==
Embolded drivers and manufacturers are competing in the World Rally Championship in the current season.
A pink background indicates an event which was not part of the World Rally Championship.

=== Drivers ===
Wins	Driver	Years won
7	(France) Sébastien Ogier	2010, 2011, 2013, 2014, 2017, 2024, 2025
5	(Finland) Markku Alén	1975, 1977, 1978, 1981, 1987
3	(Finland) Hannu Mikkola	1979, 1983, 1984
3	(Italy) Miki Biasion	1988, 1989, 1990
3	(Portugal) Armindo Araújo	2003, 2004, 2006
2	(Finland) Juha Kankkunen	1992, 1994
2	(Spain) Carlos Sainz	1991, 1995
2	(United Kingdom) Colin McRae	1998, 1999
2	(Finland) Tommi Mäkinen	1997, 2001
2	(France) Sébastien Loeb	2007, 2009
2	(Finland) Kalle Rovanperä	2022, 2023
2	(Belgium) Thierry Neuville	2018, 2026

=== Manufacturers ===
Wins	Manufacturer	Years won
10	(Japan) Toyota	1991, 1994, 1996, 2002, 2019, 2021, 2022, 2023, 2024, 2025
8	(Italy) Lancia	1968, 1970, 1976, 1987, 1988, 1989, 1990, 1992
8	(France) Citroën	1969, 2003, 2004, 2007, 2009, 2010, 2011, 2016
6	(Italy) Fiat	1974, 1975, 1977, 1978, 1980, 1981
5	(United Kingdom) Ford	1979, 1993, 1999, 2012, 2017
4	(Japan) Subaru	1995, 1998, 2000, 2005
3	(Germany) Audi	1982, 1983, 1984
3	(Japan) Mitsubishi	1997, 2001, 2006
3	(Germany) Volkswagen	2013, 2014, 2015
2	(France) Alpine-Renault	1971, 1973
2	(France) Renault	1967, 1986
2	(France) Peugeot	1985, 2008
2	(South Korea) Hyundai	2018, 2026
