= 1973 Rallye de Portugal =

Rallying motorsport event

1973 Rallye de Portugal 7th TAP Rally of Portugal
Round 3 of the 1973 World Rally Championship season
| ← Previous event | Next event → |
- Host country: Portugal
- Dates run: March 13, 1973 – March 18, 1973
- Start location: Various cities in Europe
- Finish location: Estoril, Portugal
- Stages: 32 (387 km; 240 miles)
- Stage surface: Asphalt and gravel
- Overall distance: 4,600 km (2,900 miles)

Statistics
- Crews: 80 at start, 23 at finish

Overall results
- Overall winner: (France) Jean-Luc Thérier (France) Jacques Jaubert (France) Alpine Renault; Alpine Renault A110 1800

The 1973 Rallye de Portugal (formally the 7th TAP Rally of Portugal) was the third round of the inaugural World Rally Championship season. Run in mid-March in southern Portugal on a mixture of asphalt and gravel, the rally began with a concentration run from a number of European cities, covering about 4,600 km and ending in Estoril, Portugal.

== Report ==
In 1973, and for several years afterward, only manufacturers were given points for finishes in WRC events. As in the earlier Monte Carlo Rally, the Alpine A110s led the event, taking first and second place well ahead of other competitors. Fiat had a disastrous rally, with all three of its cars failing to finish, limiting Fiat to points gained from local entrants. Despite a significant number of international entries, only four non-Portuguese teams finished in the top 15 at the end.

== Results ==
1973 Rallye de Portugal results
| Finish | | Total time | Group | Car # | Driver Co-driver | Car | Mfr. points |
| Overall | In group | Total time | Group | Car # | Driver Co-driver | Car | Mfr. points |
|---|---|---|---|---|---|---|---|
| 1 | 1 | 5 h : 42 m : 16 s | 4 | 5 | (France) Jean-Luc Thérier (France) Jacques Jaubert | (France) Alpine-Renault A110 1800 | 20 |
| 2 | 2 | 5 h : 48 m : 57 s | 4 | 1 | (France) Jean-Pierre Nicolas (France) Michel Vial | (France) Alpine-Renault A110 1800 | |
| 3 | 1 | 6 h : 7 m : 48 s | 2 | 20 | (Portugal) Francisco Romaozinho (Portugal) José Bernardo | (France) Citroën DS 21 | 12 |
| 4 | 3 | 6 h : 10 m : 40 s | 4 | 15 | (Portugal) Luis Netto (Portugal) Manuel Coentro | (Italy) Fiat Abarth 124 Rallye | 10 |
| 5 | 4 | 6 h : 17 m : 0 s | 4 | 19 | (Portugal) Américo Nunes (Portugal) António Morais | (Germany) Porsche 911 | 8 |
| 6 | 5 | 6 h : 41 m : 0 s | 4 | 14 | (Portugal) António Borges (Portugal) António Lemos | (France) Alpine-Renault A110 1800 | |
| 7 | 1 | 6 h : 51 m : 40 s | 1 | 25 | (Portugal) Mêquêpê (Portugal) Jorge Amaral | (Germany) Opel Ascona | 4 |
| 8 | 2 | 6 h : 56 m : 9 s | 1 | 58 | (Portugal) António Martorell (Spain) Augusto Roxo | (Germany) Opel Ascona | |
| 9 | 2 | 7 h : 4 m : 47 s | 2 | 52 | (Sweden) Hans Britth (Sweden) Hans Reppling | (United Kingdom) Ford Capri 2600 | 2 |
| 10 | 6 | 7 h : 5 m : 24 s | 4 | 16 | (Portugal) Giovanni Salvi (Portugal) Barbosa Gama | (Germany) Porsche 911 | |
| 11 | 3 | 7 h : 10 m : 26 s | 1 | 64 | (Portugal) Xanato (Portugal) Manuel Ferreira | (Japan) Datsun 1200 | |
| 12 | 3 | 7 h : 21 m : 51 s | 2 | 12 | (France) Claude Laurent (Belgium) Christian Delferier | (Netherlands) DAF 55 | |
| 13 | 4 | 7 h : 26 m : 27 s | 2 | 80 | (Portugal) Noel Coelho (Portugal) José Varela | (Germany) BMW 2002 | |
| 14 | 4 | 7 h : 43 m : 15 s | 1 | 69 | (Portugal) António Ferreira da Cunha (Portugal) Carlos Resende | (Japan) Datsun 1200 | |
| 15 | 5 | 7 h : 43 m : 43 s | 1 | 67 | (Portugal) Jorge Ortigao (Portugal) J. Cerqueria | (Japan) Datsun 1200 | |
| 16 | 6 | 7 h : 47 m : 47 s | 1 | 54 | (United Kingdom) Colin Malkin (United Kingdom) Barry Hughes | (United States) Chrysler Avenger | |
| 17 | 5 | 7 h : 53 m : 27 s | 2 | 66 | (Portugal) Rui Gonçalves (Portugal) João Batista | (United Kingdom) Austin 1275 GT | |
| 18 | 7 | 7 h : 59 m : 39 s | 1 | 85 | (Portugal) Pedro Cortes (Portugal) Teixeira Gomes | (Japan) Toyota | |
| 19 | 8 | 8 h : 13 m : 12 s | 1 | 39 | (Austria) Helmut Doppeireiter (Austria) Ossi Schurek | (Germany) Volkswagen 1303S | |
| 20 | 6 | 8 h : 38 m : 40 s | 2 | 68 | (Portugal) Martins Teixeira (Portugal) A. Magalhaes | (United Kingdom) Austin Maxi | |
| 21 | 9 | 8 h : 51 m : 56 s | 1 | 97 | (Belgium) Paul Chartier (Belgium) Jo Wery | (France) Citroën GS | |
| 22 | 10 | 8 h : 56 m : 19 s | 1 | 38 | (Austria) Johann Fennes (Austria) Unger | (France) Citroën GS | |
| 23 | 7 | 9 h : 13 m : 22 s | 2 | 99 | (Netherlands) Eric Bessem (Netherlands) Bob Dickhout | (Netherlands) DAF 55 | |
| Retired (mechanical) | | | 4 | 2 | (Italy) Alcide Paganelli (Italy) Ninni Russo | (Italy) Fiat Abarth 124 Rallye | |
| Retired (mechanical) | | | 4 | 3 | (France) Bernard Darniche (France) Alain Mahé | (France) Alpine Renault A110 1800 | |
| Retired (accident) | | | 4 | 4 | (Sweden) Björn Waldegård (Sweden) Hans Thorszelius | (Italy) Fiat Abarth 124 Rallye | |
| Retired (mechanical) | | | 4 | 6 | (Italy) Raffaele Pinto (Italy) Arnaldo Bernacchini | (Italy) Fiat Abarth 124 Rallye | |
| Retired (mechanical) | | | 4 | 7 | (United Kingdom) Chris Sclater (Netherlands) Bob de Jong | (Japan) Datsun 240Z | |
| Retired (mechanical) | | | 2 | 8 | (Germany) Achim Warmbold (United Kingdom) John Davenport | (Germany) BMW 2002 | |
| Retired (accident) | | | 2 | 9 | (Sweden) Ove Andersson (France) Jean Todt | (Japan) Toyota Celica | |
| Retired (mechanical) | | | 2 | 10 | (Sweden) Harry Källström (Sweden) Claes Billstam | (Germany) Volkswagen 1302S | |
| Retired (mechanical) | | | 2 | 11 | (United Kingdom) Tony Fall (United Kingdom) Mike Wood | (Germany) Volkswagen 1303S | |
| Retired (accident) | | | 4 | 17 | (Portugal) Mário Figueiredo (Portugal) Carlos Barata | (Italy) Fiat Abarth 124 Rallye | |
| Retired (mechanical) | | | 4 | 18 | (Portugal) António Carlos Oliveira (Portugal) Barata | (Japan) Datsun 240Z | |
| Retired (mechanical) | | | 4 | 21 | (Portugal) José Carpinteiro Albino (Portugal) F. Albino | (Italy) Fiat Abarth 124 Rallye | |
| Retired (mechanical) | | | 1 | 22 | (Portugal) Gomes Pereira (Portugal) Costa Simoes | (Germany) Opel Ascona | |
| Retired (mechanical) | | | 2 | 23 | (Portugal) Francisco Santos (Portugal) Joao Anjos | (United Kingdom) Ford Escort RS1600 | |
| Retired (mechanical) | | | 1 | 26 | (Portugal) Raposo de Magalhaes (Portugal) L. Pedreira | (United Kingdom) Morris Mini Cooper | |
| Retired (mechanical) | | | 2 | 27 | (Austria) Richard Bochnicek (Austria) Sepp-Dieter Kernmayer | (France) Citroën DS 21 | |
| Retired (mechanical) | | | 2 | 30 | (United Kingdom) Tony Fowkes (United Kingdom) Peter O'Gorman | (United Kingdom) Ford Escort RS1600 | |
| Retired | | | 2 | 32 | (United Kingdom) Douglas Harris (United Kingdom) John Jeson | (United Kingdom) Ford Escort RS1600 | |
| Retired (mechanical) | | | 2 | 34 | (Austria) Georg Fischer (Austria) Hans Siebert | (Germany) Volkswagen 1302S | |
| Retired (mechanical) | | | 1 | 35 | (France) Marie-Claude Beaumont (France) Christine Giganot | (Germany) Opel Ascona | |
| Retired (accident) | | | 2 | 36 | (Austria) Herbert Grünsteidl (Austria) Georg Hopf | (Germany) Volkswagen 1302S | |
| Retired (mechanical) | | | 1 | 42 | (Sweden) Leif Asterhag (Sweden) Anders Gullberg | (Germany) BMW 2002 TII | |
| Retired (mechanical) | | | 1 | 44 | (Sweden) Lassa Jönsson (Sweden) Rolf Jägerstedt | (Germany) BMW 2002 TII | |
| Retired (mechanical) | | | 1 | 45 | (Sweden) Arne Allansson (Sweden) Bo Sundberg | (Germany) BMW 2002 TII | |
| Retired (mechanical) | | | 1 | 51 | (Austria) Günther Janger (Austria) Harald Gottlieb | (Germany) Opel Ascona | |
| Retired | | | 1 | 55 | (Portugal) Heitor Morais (Portugal) D. Mascarenhas | (Germany) Opel Ascona | |
| Retired (mechanical) | | | 2 | 65 | (Portugal) Joaquim Moutinho (Portugal) Edgar Fortes | (United Kingdom) Austin Maxi | |
| Retired (accident) | | | 2 | 83 | (United Kingdom) Andy Michailidis (United Kingdom) N. Anstis | (United Kingdom) Ford Escort RS1600 | |

Source: Independent WRC archive

== Championship standings after the event ==
1973 World Rally Championship for Manufacturers points standings after round 3
| After round 3 | | Team | Season end | |
| Position | Points | Team | Position | Points |
|---|---|---|---|---|
| 1 | 52 | (France) Alpine Renault | 1 | 147 |
| 2 | 22 | (Italy) Fiat | 2 | 84 |
| 3 | 20 | (Sweden) Saab | 5 | 42 |
| 4 | 13 | (Italy) Lancia | 13 | 17 |
| 5 | 12 | (France) Citroën | 7 | 33 |
| 6 | 12 | (United States) Ford | 3 | 76 |
| 7 | 8 | (Germany) Porsche | 9 | 27 |
| 8 | 6 | (Germany) Volkswagen | 15 | 15 |
| 9 | 5 | (Germany) Opel | 11 | 25 |
| 10 | 4 | (Germany) BMW | 8 | 28 |
| 11 | 3 | (Czechoslovakia) Škoda | 18 | 3 |
| 12 | 2 | (Japan) Datsun | 6 | 34 |
| 13 | 2 | (Sweden) Volvo | 4 | 44 |
