= Fiat 124 Sport Spider =

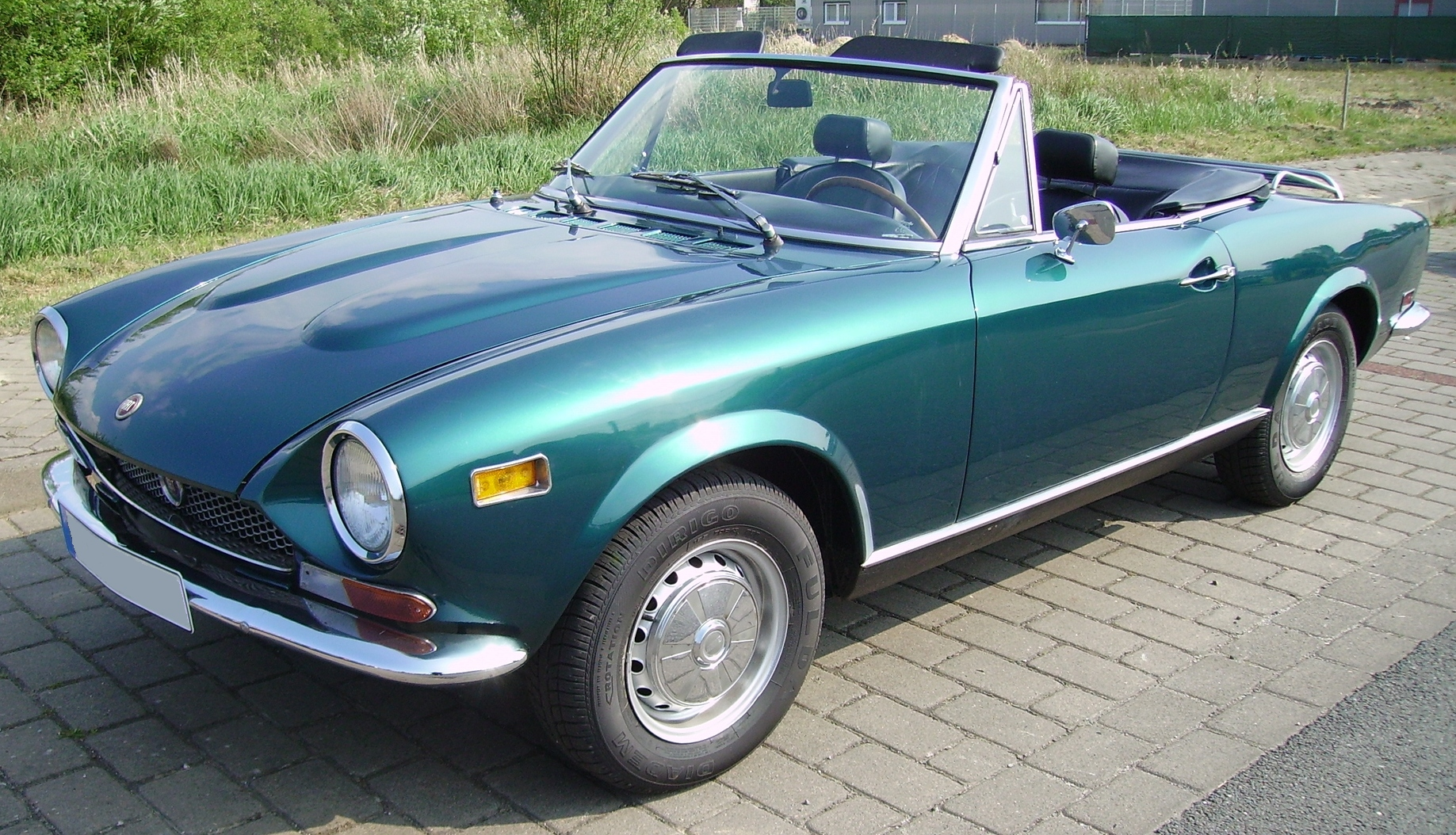
- Fiat 124 Sport Spider (CS)

Overview
- Manufacturer: Fiat (1966–1982); Pininfarina (1982–1985)
- Also called: Fiat Spider 2000; Pininfarina Spider (1982–1985)
- Production: 1966–1985
- Assembly: Italy: Turin; Italy: San Giorgio Canavese (Pininfarina)
- Designer: Pininfarina: Tom Tjaarda (designer); Franco Martinengo (design director); Battista Pininfarina

Body and chassis
- Class: Sports car
- Body style: 2-door cabriolet
- Layout: Front-engine, rear-wheel-drive
- Related: Fiat 124

Powertrain
- Engine: 1,438 cc (1.4 L) I4; 1,592 cc (1.6 L) I4; 1,608 cc (1.6 L) I4; 1,756 cc (1.8 L) I4; 1,995 cc (2.0 L) I4; 1,995 cc (2.0 L) turbo I4; 1,995 cc (2.0 L) sc I4
- Transmission: 4-speed manual; 5-speed manual; 3-speed automatic

Dimensions
- Wheelbase: 89.75 in (2,280 mm)
- Length: 156.25 in (3,969 mm)
- Width: 63.5 in (1,613 mm)
- Height: 49.25 in (1,251 mm)
- Kerb weight: 2,028 lb (920 kg)

Chronology
- Predecessor: Fiat Pininfarina Cabriolet
- Successor: Fiat Barchetta; Fiat 124 Spider (2016) (Spiritual)

The Fiat 124 Sport Spider is a convertible sports car marketed by Fiat for model years 1966–1982 and by Pininfarina for 1982–1985 model years. Designed by and manufactured at the Italian carrozzeria Pininfarina factory, the monocoque, front-engined, rear-drive Sport Spider debuted at the November 1966 Turin Auto Show with styling by Tom Tjaarda.

Fiat later marketed the car as the Spider 2000 (1979–1982). After being retired by Fiat, Pininfarina continued the production of the model under its own brand as Pininfarina Spider Azzurra for the North American market and Pininfarina Spidereuropa for the European market for three more years, from August 1982 until 1985.

In 2015, a successor of the Fiat 124 Spider was presented at the Los Angeles Auto Show.

== Development ==
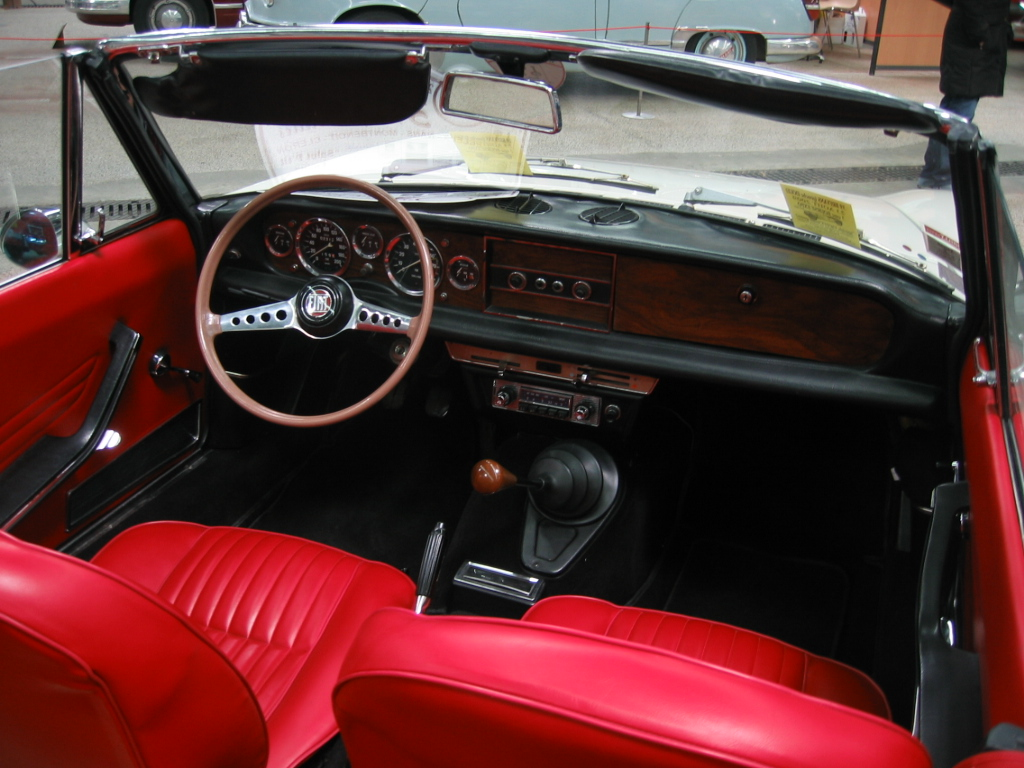
Interior (AS)

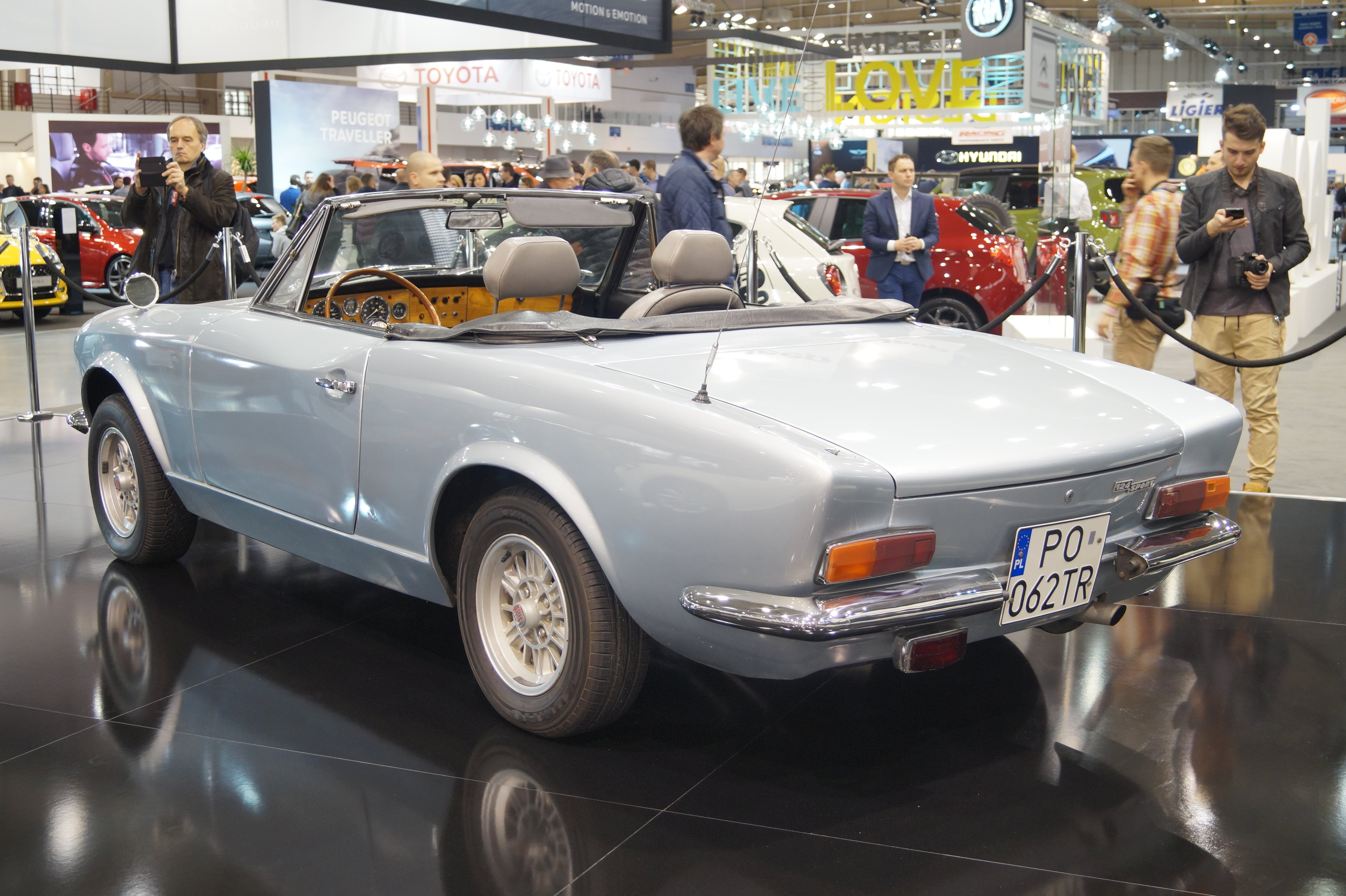
A 1972 Fiat 124 Sport Spider

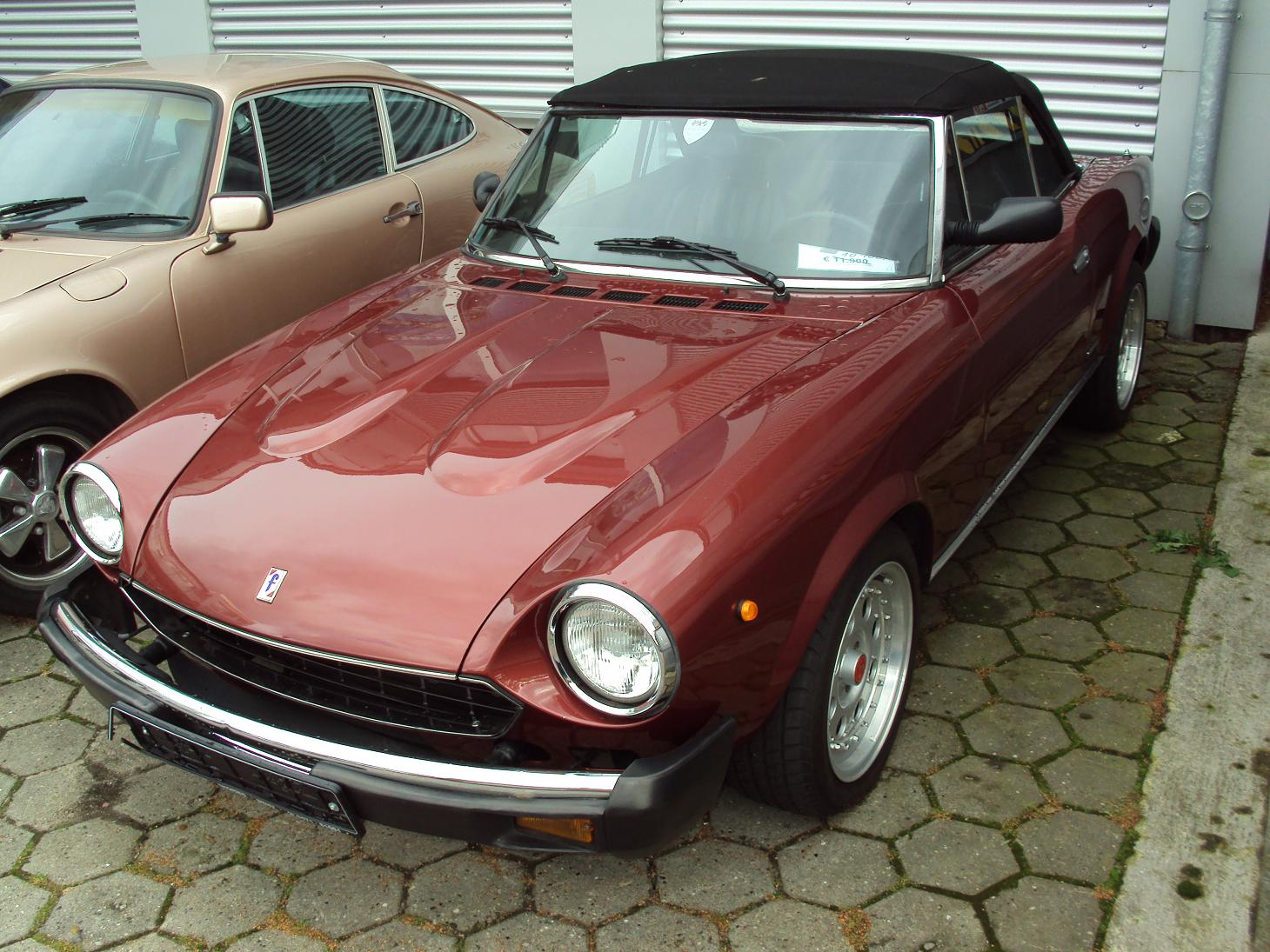
Pininfarina Spidereuropa

The Fiat 124 Sport Spider was designed by Pininfarina and styled in-house by Tom Tjaarda. The 124 Sport Spider, 124 Sport Coupé and 124 sedan share much of their running gear, and in the case of the coupé, platforms. The Sports Spider uses a shorter platform and a shorter wheelbase, and, unlike the Pininfarina-styled and manufactured spider, Fiat designed and manufactured the coupé in-house.

The succession of build series of the 124 were designated internally as AS, BS, BS1, CS, and CSA. AS models had a torque tube transmitting power to the rear wheels; this crack-prone design was replaced by a trailing-arm rear axle with the second series (BS) during 1969, which was manufactured alongside the AS for the first six months of 1970. The early AS cars also have smaller taillights, while the BS received a mesh grille and black-rimmed gauges inside. In July 1970, the 1.6-liter BS1 appeared; this model is recognizable by its twin humps on the bonnet and bumper overriders. The CS series Spider arrived during 1972. Also in 1972, a sports version of the Spider debuted, required for type-approval of its rally version, and was marketed as 124 CSA (C-Spider-Abarth). The vehicle has a capacity of 128 hp (94 kW). In three years, Fiat manufactured fewer than 1000 CSA models, which were intended for sale to individual clients.

The car was manufactured by Fiat (with a Pininfarina body) in Turin until October 1981, when Pininfarina took over manufacture in their San Giorgio Canavese plant. Serial numbers started over from zero, while the 11th digit in the vehicle identification number was switched from an 8 to a 5. The Fiat Spider 2000 ended manufacture in July 1982, and after the Italian summer holidays, production of Pininfarina-badged cars commenced in its place.

== Specifications ==
=== Engines ===
The four-cylinder engine used in the spider and coupé is a double overhead cam, aluminum crossflow head version of the sedan's pushrod unit. It started in 1966 with a capacity of 1438 cc, progressively increasing to 1608 cc in 1970 (although this was reduced to 1,592 cc in 1973), 1,756 cc in 1974, and finally 1,995 cc in 1979. The Fiat Twin Cam engine was designed by ex-Ferrari engineer Aurelio Lampredi. Bosch fuel injection replaced the previously used Weber carburetors midway through 1980. In 1981 and 1982, Fiat USA, Inc. partnered with Legend Industries to create around 700 turbo models for US markets. A supercharged model called "Volumex" also was offered toward the end of production; it was sold only in Europe, where it cost 35% more than a regular, fuel-injected Spidereuropa. (Note: 22,000,000 versus 16,300,000 liras in 1984) This family of engines remained in production into the 1990s, giving it one of the longest production runs in automotive history. The double overhead cam (DOHC) version of the engine was the first mass manufactured DOHC to use reinforced-rubber timing belts, an innovation that came into nearly universal use in the decades after its introduction. Its derivatives powered race cars such as the Fiat 131 Mirafiori, 124 Special T, Lancia Beta Montecarlo, Delta Integrale, and many others.

Years	Model	Engine	Capacity	Bore x stroke mm	Compr. ratio	Power at engine speed
1967–73		124 AC 040	1,438 cc	80 x 71.5 mm	8.9:1	90 PS (66 kW; 89 hp) at 6,000 rpm
1973–77		132 AC 000	1,592 cc	80 x 79.2 mm	9.8:1	108 PS (79 kW; 107 hp) at 6,000 rpm
1973–75	Abarth Rally	132 AC 4.000	1,756 cc	84 x 79.2 mm	9.8:1	128 PS (94 kW; 126 hp) at 6,200 rpm
1970–73		125 BC 000	1,608 cc	80 x 80 mm	9.8:1	110 PS (81 kW; 108 hp) at 6,400 rpm
1973–77		132 AC1 000	1,756 cc	84 x 79.2 mm	9.8:1	118 PS (87 kW; 116 hp) at 6,000 rpm
1974–78		132 A1 040	1,756 cc	84 x 79.2 mm	8.9:1	118 PS (87 kW; 116 hp) at 5,800 rpm
1974–78		131 A1 040	1,756 cc	84 x 79.2 mm	8.1:1	87 PS (64 kW; 86 hp) at 6,200 rpm
1979–81		132 C2 040	1,995 cc	84 x 90 mm	8.1:1	83 PS (61 kW; 82 hp) at 5,800 rpm
1979–85		132 C3 031	1,995 cc	84 x 90 mm	8.2:1	102 PS (75 kW; 101 hp) at 5,500 rpm
1979–85	Spidereuropa	132 C3 031	1,995 cc	84 x 90 mm	8.2:1	105 PS (77 kW; 104 hp) at 5,500 rpm
1984–85	Volumex	132 V3 031	1,995 cc	84 x 90 mm	7.5:1	135 PS (99 kW; 133 hp) at 6,000 rpm

=== Suspension ===
Suspension is conventional by unequal-length wishbones and coilover damper at the front and by coil-spring live rear axle at the rear, which is located by a transverse link (Panhard rod) and two pairs of forward-extending radius rods to react to braking and acceleration forces, and to control axle wind-up.

== Models ==
=== North American model ===
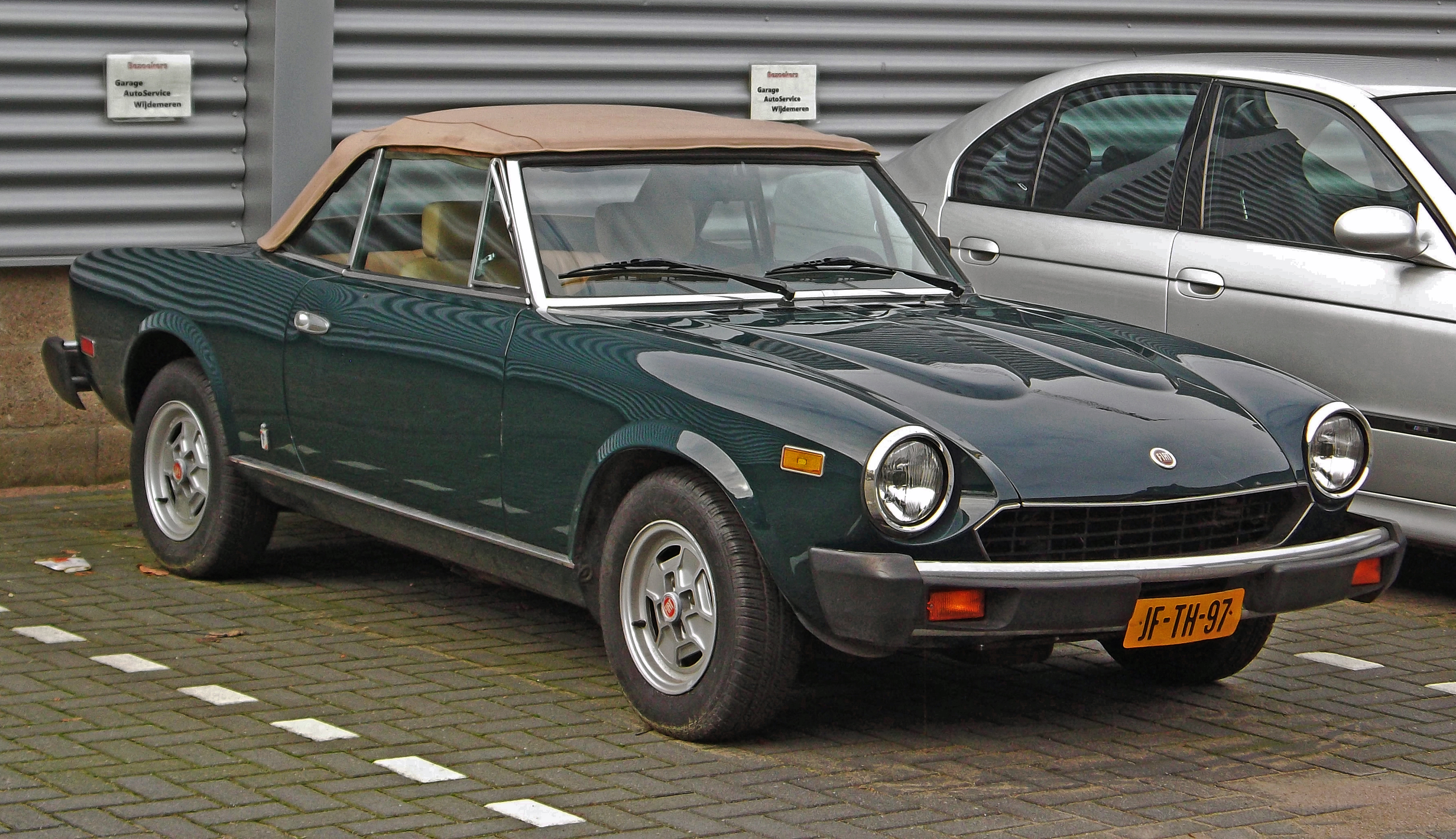
1981 Fiat 124 Spider 2000 (US)

The coupé and Spider were marketed in Canada and the US beginning in 1968. In 1969, the Spider featured four-wheel disc brakes, double overhead cams, hesitation wipers, steering column-mounted lighting controls, radial-ply tyres, and a five-speed manual transmission. An optional three-speed automatic transmission from General Motors was available from 1979 through 1985 for North America and Japan. The Spider's convertible top was known for its simplicity of use—allowing a seated driver to quickly raise or lower the top. When the engine was upgraded to 2.0 L, the model was renamed the Fiat Spider 2000. For the 1980 model year, a version with a catalytic converter and Bosch L-Jetronic fuel injection was introduced for California and optional in the other 49 states. For 1981, this engine, with 102 hp (76 kW), became standard fitment in North America.

Fiat subsequently stopped marketing the Spider and the X1/9—to have their marketing assumed by their respective carrozzerie. In Europe, the Ritmo Cabrio was also marketed by Bertone rather than Fiat itself. In the US, Fiat turned over marketing and support of the Spider and the X1/9 to International Automobile Importers, Inc., headed by Malcolm Bricklin.

=== Fiat Abarth 124 Rally ===
Fiat Abarth 124 Rally
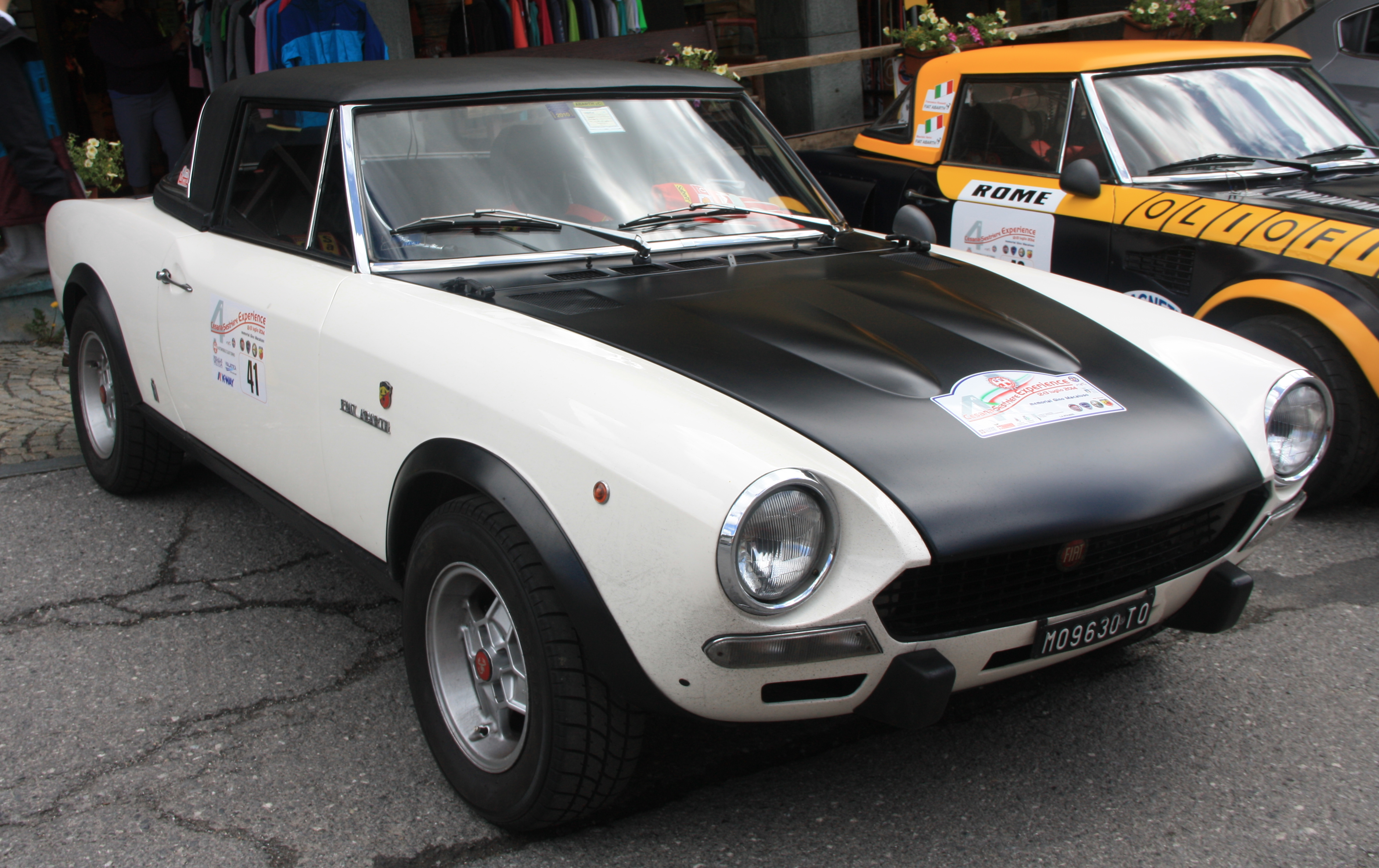

Body and chassis
- Body style: 2-door spider with fixed hardtop

Chronology
- Successor: Fiat Abarth 131 Rally

The Fiat Abarth 124 Rally is a homologated version of the 124 Sport Spider, known also as "124 Abarth Stradale", introduced in November 1972. It received Fédération Internationale de l'Automobile homologation in the special grand touring cars (group 4) racing class, and replaced the 1.6-litre Fiat Sport Spider rally cars, which were then being campaigned. At the time, 124 had already won the 1972 European Rally Championship at the hands of Raffaele Pinto and Gino Macaluso. The 124 Rally was added to the Sport Spider range, which included the 1600 and 1800 models; the first 500 examples produced were earmarked for the domestic Italian market.

Amongst the most notable modifications over the standard Spider were independent rear suspension, engine upgrades, lightweight body panels, and a rigid hard top.

In place of the usual rear solid axle, independent suspension from lower wishbones is used, with the original trailing arms, an upper strut, and an antiroll bar. At the front, a radius rod on each side was added to the standard double wishbones.

The Abarth-tuned type 132 AC 4.000 1.8-litre, twin-cam engine was brought from the standard 118 to 128 PS DIN (94 kW; 126 hp) by replacing the standard twin-choke carburettor with double vertical twin-choke Weber 44 IDFs, and by fitting an Abarth exhaust with a dual exit muffler. The 9.8:1 compression ratio was left unchanged.

The transmission is the all-synchronised five-speed optional on the other Sport Spider models, and brakes are discs on all four corners. Despite the 20 kg (44 lb) four-point roll bar fitted, kerb weight is 938 kg (2,068 lb), roughly 25 kg (55 lb) less than the regular 1.8-litre Sport Spider.

The engine bonnet, boot lid, and fixed hard top are fibreglass, painted matt black; the rear window is perspex and the doors are aluminium. Front and rear bumpers were deleted and replaced by simple rubber bumperettes. A single matte-black wing mirror was fitted. Matte-black wheel-arch extensions house 185/70 VR 13 Pirelli CN 36 tyres on 5.5 J × 13" four-spoke alloy wheels. Inside, the centre console, rear occasional seats, and glovebox lid were eliminated; its new features were anodised aluminium dashboard trim, a small, three-spoke, leather-covered Abarth steering wheel, and Recaro corduroy-and-leather bucket seats as an extra-cost option. The car carries Fiat badging front and rear, Abarth badges, and "Fiat Abarth" scripts on the front wings, and Abarth wheel-centre caps. Only three paint colours were available: Corsa red, white, and light blue.

Fiat Abarth 124 Rally, specifications and comparison
	Fiat Abarth 124 Rally	Fiat 124 Sport Spider 1800
Engine	1,756 cc DOHC inline-four
Carburettors	2x twin-choke Weber 44 IDF	1x twin-choke Weber 34 DMS
Power	128 PS DIN (94 kW; 126 hp) at 6,200 rpm	118 PS DIN (87 kW; 116 hp) at 6,000 rpm
Torque	16.2 kg⋅m (159 N⋅m; 117 lb⋅ft) at 5,200 rpm	15.6 kg⋅m (153 N⋅m; 113 lb⋅ft) at 4,000 rpm
Wheelbase	2,280 mm (89.8 in)	2,280 mm (89.8 in)
Length	3,914 mm (154.1 in)	3,971 mm (156.3 in)
Width	1,630 mm (64.2 in)	1,613 mm (63.5 in)
Track front–rear	1,413–1,400 mm (55.6–55.1 in)	1,346–1,316 mm (53.0–51.8 in)
Kerb weight incl. 75 kg driver	938 kg (2,068 lb)	960 kg (2,116 lb)
Top speed	over 190 km/h (118 mph)	185 km/h (115 mph)

== Rallying ==
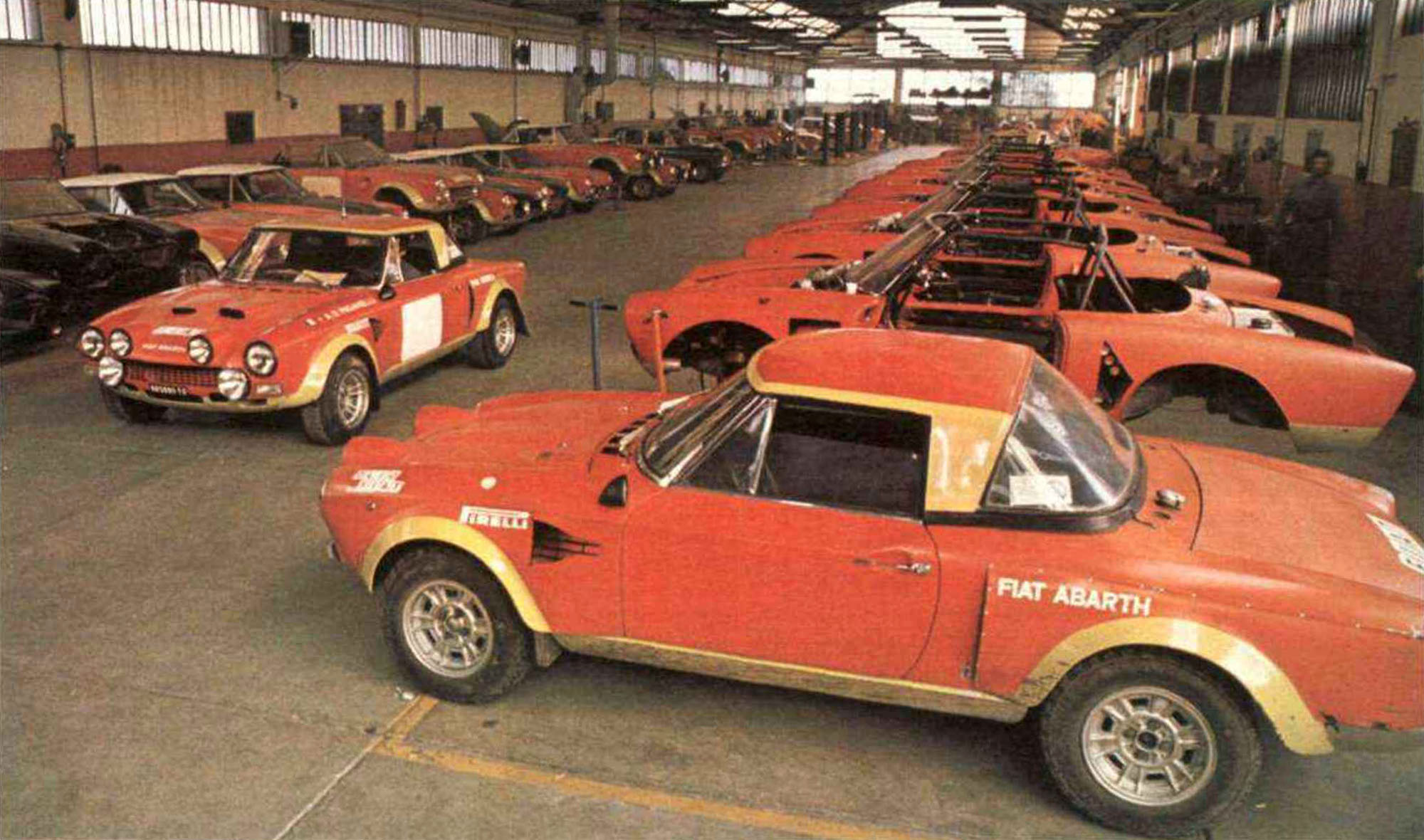
Fiat Abarth 124 Rallyes in Abarth factory in Turin, c. 1975

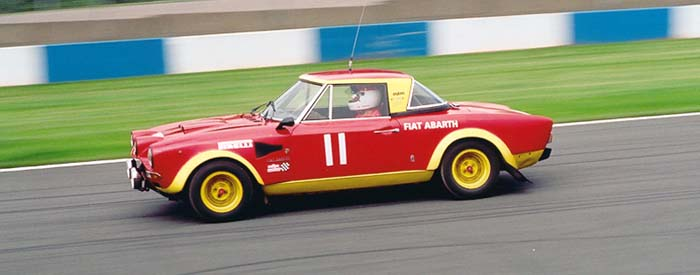
Fiat 124 Abarth at Silverstone circuit 2003

In 1971, the 124 Spider was prepared for the International Championship for Manufacturers when Abarth became involved with its production and development. Abarth designer Ing. Colucci was responsible for getting the 124 Spider into Group 4 rally trim. Over this period, the Abarth Spider was relatively successful with wins at the 1972 Hessen Rally, Acropolis Rally, 1973 Polish Rally, 19th on the 1973 RAC rally, and seventh to mostly the Alpine Renaults on the 1973 Monte Carlo Rally. The Spider continued to perform with first, second, and third in the 1974 eighth Portuguese TAP Rally, sixth in the 1974 1000 Lakes Rally, fourth in the 1975 Monte Carlo Rally, and also with Markku Alén driving the spider to third place. By 1976, the days of 124 rallying were numbered due to the appearance of the Fiat-Abarth 131.

== Production ==
The Spider was sold from 1966 for European and US markets, but from 1975 until 1981, they were produced only for the US market. In 1981, they were reintroduced in Europe until the end of production in 1985. Almost 200,000 Spiders had been manufactured, with 75% for the US market. The nine models of the spider are the AS, BS, BS1, CS, CSA (Abarth), CS1, CS2, CS0, and DS.

Year	Model	Starting chassis no.	Displacement	Engine type	Fuel delivery	Aspiration
1966	AS	000001	1438	124 AC.040	Carbureted	Naturally
1967	AS		1438	124 AC.040	Carbureted	Naturally
1968	AS	0005619	1438	124 AC.040	Carbureted	Naturally
1969	AS	0010554	1438	124 AC.040	Carbureted	Naturally
1970	BS	0021861	1438	124 AC.040	Carbureted	Naturally
1971	BS	22589	1438	124 AC.040	Carbureted	Naturally
1971	BS1	33950	1608	125BC.040	Carbureted	Naturally
1972	BS1	47032	1608	125BC.040	Carbureted	Naturally
1973	CS	59592	1608	125BC.040	Carbureted	Naturally
1973	CS1	63308	1592	132 AC.040.3	Carbureted	Naturally
1974	CS1	71650	1756	132 A1.040.4	Carbureted	Naturally
1975	CS	88792	1756	132 A1.040.5	Carbureted	Naturally
1975	CS	88792	1756	132 A1.031.5 US market	Carbureted	Naturally
1976	CS1	99909	1756	132 A1.040.5	Carbureted	Naturally
1976	CS1	99909	1756	132 A1.031.5 US market	Carbureted	Naturally
1977	CS	113343	1756	132 A1.040.5	Carbureted	Naturally
1977	CS	113343	1756	132 A1.031.5 US market	Carbureted	Naturally
1978	CS	126001	1756	132 A1.040.5	Carbureted	Naturally
1978	CS	126001	1756	132 A1.031.5 US market	Carbureted	Naturally
1979	CS2	142514	1995	132 CS2.040	Carbureted	Naturally
1979	CS2	142514	1995	132 CS2.031 US market	Carbureted	Naturally
1980	CS0	00171001	1995	132 C3.031	Fuel Injected	Naturally
1980	CS0	1938507	1995	132 C3.031	Carbureted	Naturally
1980	CS2	0157654	1995	132 C3.040	Carbureted	Naturally
1981	CS0	171001	1995	132 C3.031	Fuel injected	Naturally
1981	CS2	164089	1995	132 C3.040	Fuel injected	Turbocharged option
1982	CS2	1938507	1995	132 C3.040	Fuel injected	Turbocharged option
6/1982	DS0	1967897	1995	132 C3.040	Fuel injected	Naturally
1983	DS0	5500001	1995	132 C3.040	Fuel injected	Naturally
1984	DS0	5503666	1995	132 C3.040	Fuel injected	Naturally
1985	DS0	5506060	1995	132 C3.040	Carbureted	Supercharged (Volumex)

Production by year, 1970–1985
Year	1970	1971	1972	1973	1974	1975	1976	1977	1978	1979	1980	1981	1982	1983	1984	1985	1970–85
Units made	14,288	13,412	12,362	12,738	15,754	14,143	11,862	14,012	16,105	18,943	14,435	4,747	3,456	2,480	2,577	1,504	172,818

== 2016 model ==
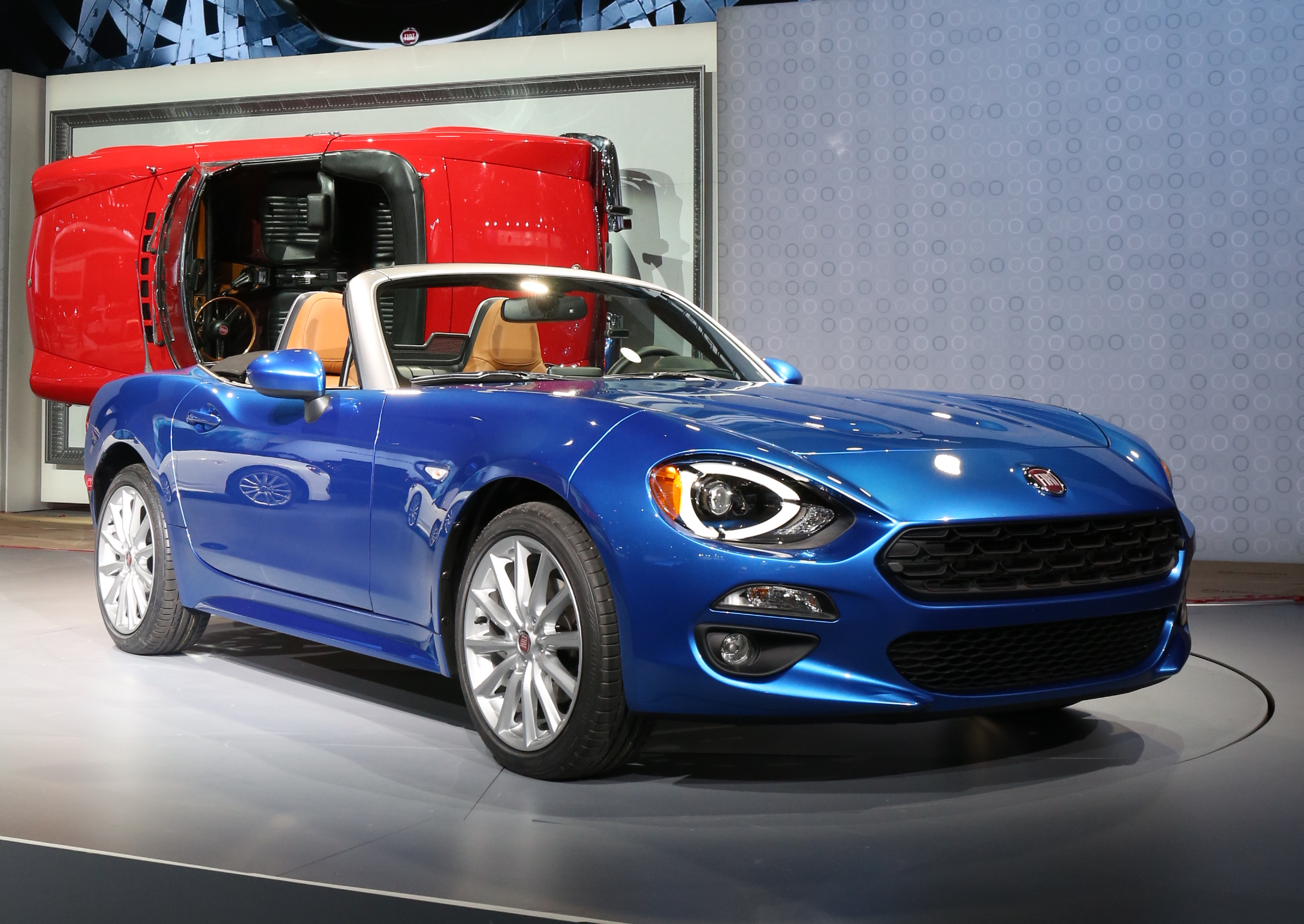
2016 Fiat 124 Spider

The 124 name was revived in 2016 through a joint venture with Mazda, using the new Mazda MX-5 platform. After considering possibly marketing the result as an Alfa Romeo Spider, the car was brought to the market as a Fiat. It was unveiled at the Los Angeles Auto Show in November 2015 and made available in late 2016. The engine is a turbocharged 1.4 MultiAir with 160 hp (119 kW) from the Fiat range.
