= Hannu Mikkola =

Finnish rally driver (1942–2021)

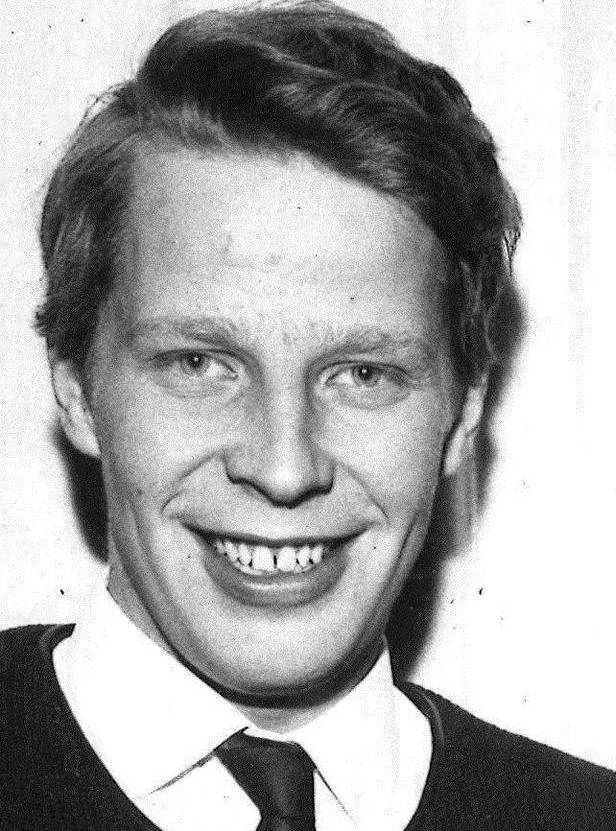
- Mikkola in 1966

Personal information
- Nationality: (Finland) Finnish
- Full name: Hannu Olavi Mikkola
- Born: 24 May 1942; Joensuu, Finland
- Died: 25 February 2021 (aged 78); Helsinki, Finland

World Rally Championship record
- Years active: 1973–1993
- Co-driver: (United Kingdom) Jim Porter (United Kingdom) John Davenport (Finland) Atso Aho (Finland) Erkki Rautanen (France) Jean Todt (Sweden) Claes Billstam (Sweden) Arne Hertz (West Germany) Roland Gumpert (West Germany) Christian Geistdörfer (Finland) Seppo Harjanne (Sweden) Johnny Johansson (Sweden) Bruno Berglund
- Teams: Ford, Toyota, Audi, Mazda, Subaru
- Rallies: 123
- Championships: 1 (1983)
- Rally wins: 18
- Podiums: 44
- Stage wins: 666
- Total points: 655
- First rally: 1973 Monte Carlo Rally
- First win: 1974 1000 Lakes Rally
- Last win: 1987 Safari Rally
- Last rally: 1993 1000 Lakes Rally

Hannu Olavi Mikkola (24 May 1942 − 25 February 2021) was a Finnish champion world rally driver. He was a seven-time winner of the 1000 Lakes Rally in Finland and won the RAC Rally in Great Britain four times.

== Career ==
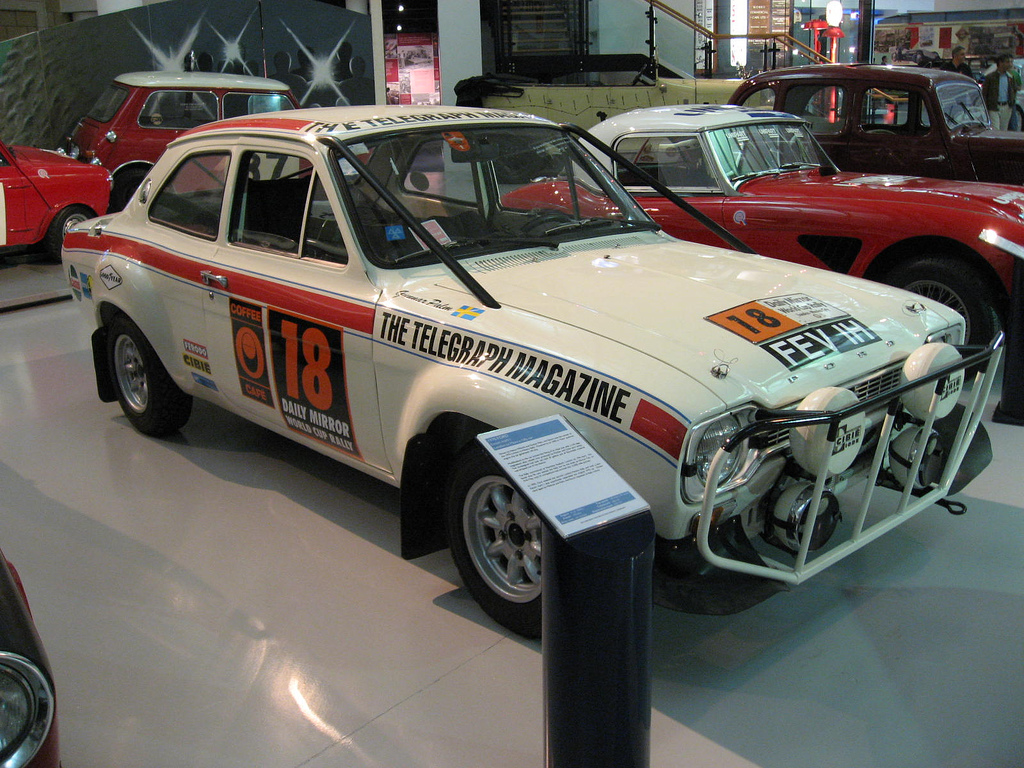
Mikkola's 1970 World Cup Rally winning Ford Escort RS1600.

Mikkola's rally career spanned 31 years, starting with a Volvo PV544 in 1963, but his most successful period was during the 1970s and 1980s. The 1970s saw Mikkola a frontrunner in many international events, usually in a Ford Escort. He became the first overseas driver to win the East African Safari Rally in 1972, partnered by Gunnar Palm and again in a Ford Escort. In 1979 he made a serious challenge at the World Rally Championship title, ultimately finishing runner-up, only one point behind champion Björn Waldegård.

Mikkola was joined by Swedish co-driver Arne Hertz in 1977 and the pair were very quickly a force to be reckoned with, winning the British Rally Championship in 1978 in an Escort. The Mikkola/Hertz partnership lasted for thirteen years, through to the end of the 1990 season. He was partnered by Johnny Johansson for the 1991 season.

Mikkola was runner-up again in the 1980 season with Ford, but switched to the new Audi factory team for the 1981 season, to drive the revolutionary four wheel drive Audi Quattro. The partnership was successful from the outset: Mikkola led the 1981 Monte Carlo Rally, the Audi's first event, until an accident put him out of the event. He convincingly won the next WRC event, the Swedish Rally, but the Quattro had problems with reliability, and despite another win on the RAC Rally, Mikkola only managed third in the driver's championship. He won the 1000 Lakes and RAC rallies the following year, but did not improve on third position in the championship, ultimately finishing behind Opel's Walter Röhrl and teammate Michèle Mouton.

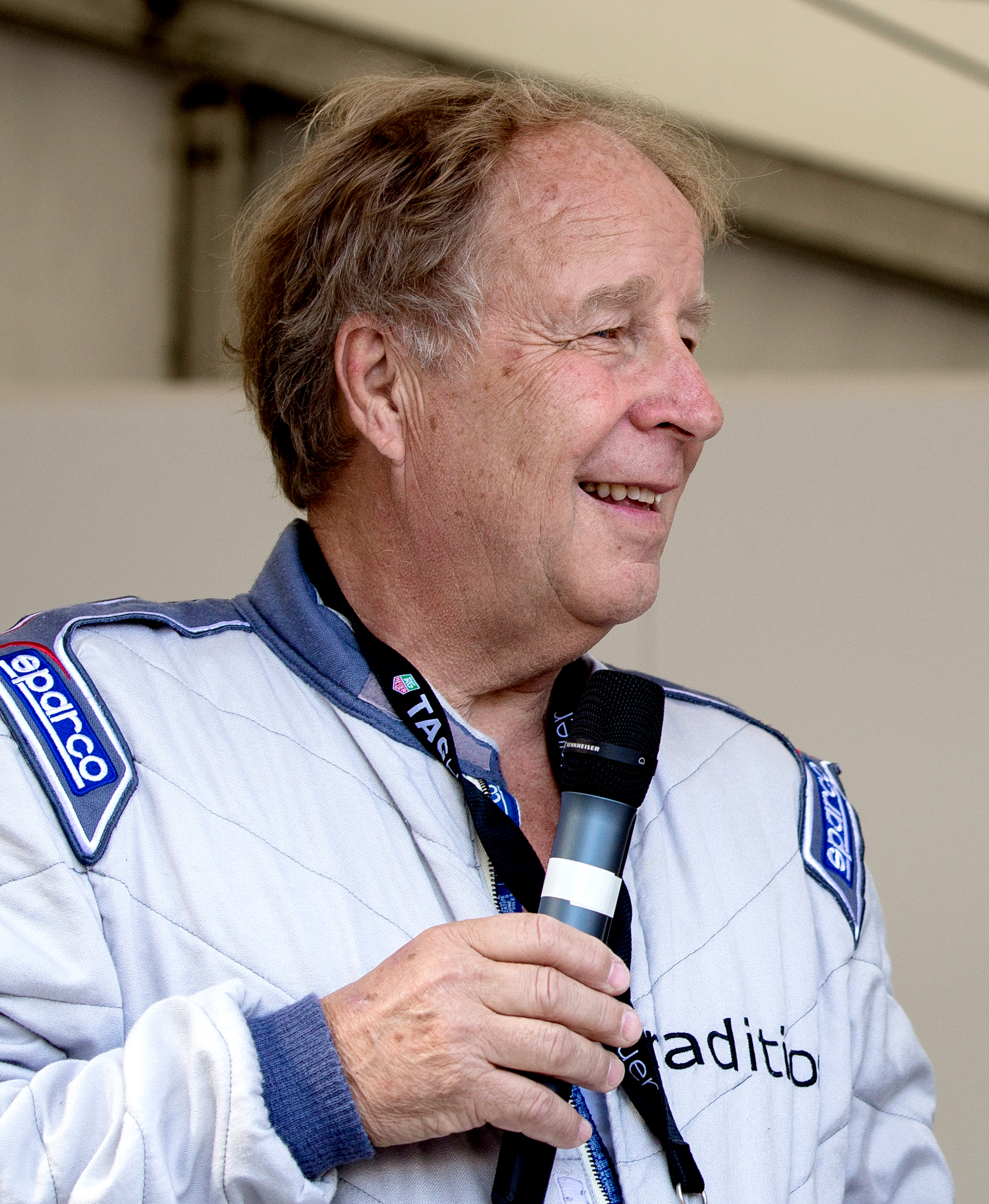
Mikkola in 2014

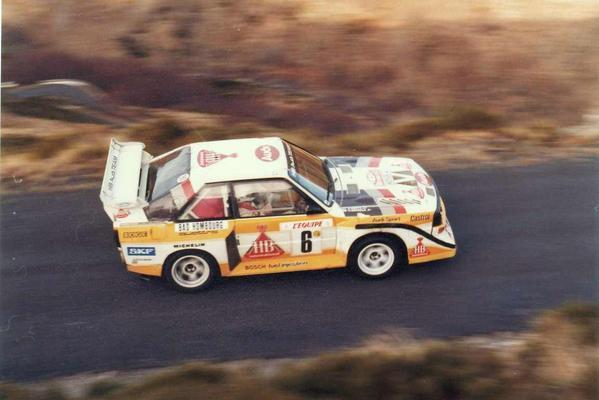
Mikkola driving a Quattro S1 at the 1986 Monte Carlo Rally

1983 was to be Mikkola's year. Four wins and three second places saw him and co-driver Arne Hertz finally take the World Championship title. With that, he until this day is the oldest rally world champion. A second place in the championship followed in 1984, behind his teammate Stig Blomqvist, but 1985 saw him compete in only four world rallies, with three retirements and a fourth place, and slip to 22nd in the final standings after the Audi team was overwhelmed by new Group B competition from Peugeot and Lancia. Mikkola remained with Audi until the 1987 season, winning the Safari Rally in a Group A Audi 200 that year, before switching to Mazda.

Mikkola remained with Mazda until entering semi-retirement in 1991, although he continued to make sporadic appearances on international rallies until retiring completely from motorsport in 1993. Mikkola has made brief appearances since then, including re-uniting with his co-driver Gunnar Palm for the 25th anniversary run of the 1970 London to Mexico World Cup Rally (Mikkola won the original 1970 event and the 1995 re-run) and competing in the London-Sydney Marathon 2000 Rally, re-united with his 1968 1000 Lakes Rally winning Ford Escort RS1600 and co-driven by his oldest son, Juha Mikkola, founder of Canada Cup (floorball).

In September 2008, Mikkola took part in the Colin McRae Forest Stages Rally, a round of the Scottish Rally Championship. He was one of a number of former world champions to take part in the event in memory of McRae, who died in 2007. In 2011, Mikkola was inducted into the Rally Hall of Fame along with Röhrl.

Mikkola died on 25 February 2021 of cancer at the age of 78.

== WRC victories ==
#	Event	Season	Co-driver	Car
1	(Finland) 1000 Lakes Rally	1974	John Davenport	Ford Escort RS1600
2	(Morocco) Rallye du Maroc	1975	Jean Todt	Peugeot 504
3	(Finland) 1000 Lakes Rally	1975	Atso Aho	Toyota Corolla
4	(United Kingdom) RAC Rally	1978	Arne Hertz	Ford Escort RS1800
5	Rallye de Portugal Vinho do Porto	1979	Arne Hertz	Ford Escort RS1800
6	Rally of New Zealand	1979	Arne Hertz	Ford Escort RS1800
7	(United Kingdom) RAC Rally	1979	Arne Hertz	Ford Escort RS1800
8	(Ivory Coast) Rallye Côte d'Ivoire	1979	Arne Hertz	Mercedes 450 SLC 5.0
9	(Sweden) Swedish Rally	1981	Arne Hertz	Audi Quattro
10	(United Kingdom) RAC Rally	1981	Arne Hertz	Audi Quattro
11	(Finland) 1000 Lakes Rally	1982	Arne Hertz	Audi Quattro
12	(United Kingdom) RAC Rally	1982	Arne Hertz	Audi Quattro
13	(Sweden) Swedish Rally	1983	Arne Hertz	Audi Quattro A1
14	Rallye de Portugal Vinho do Porto	1983	Arne Hertz	Audi Quattro A1
15	Rally Argentina	1983	Arne Hertz	Audi Quattro A2
16	(Finland) 1000 Lakes Rally	1983	Arne Hertz	Audi Quattro A2
17	Rallye de Portugal Vinho do Porto	1984	Arne Hertz	Audi Quattro A2
18	(Kenya) Safari Rally	1987	Arne Hertz	Audi 200 Quattro

== Racing record ==
=== Complete IMC results ===
Year	Entrant	Car	1	2	3	4	5	6	7	8	9
1970	Ford Motor Company Ltd	Ford Escort Twin Cam	MON; Ret	SWE; Ret	ITA	KEN	AUT	GRE	GBR; Ret		
1971	Ford Motor Company Ltd	Ford Escort Twin Cam	MON	SWE	ITA	KEN; Ret	MAR	AUT	GRE	FRA	
1971	Ford Motor Company Ltd	Ford Escort RS1600									GBR; 4
1972	Ford Motor Company Ltd	Ford Escort RS1600	MON	SWE	KEN; 1		GRE; Ret	AUT	ITA	USA	GBR; Ret
1972	Jean Guichet	Peugeot 504				MAR; Ret					

=== Complete WRC results ===
Year	Entrant	Car	1	2	3	4	5	6	7	8	9	10	11	12	13	14	WDC	Points
1973	Hannu Mikkola	Ford Escort RS 1600 MKI	MON; 4	SWE	POR	KEN; Ret											N/A	N/A
1973	Hannu Mikkola	Peugeot 504 Ti					MOR; Ret										N/A	N/A
1973	Hannu Mikkola	Volvo 142						GRE	POL	FIN; Ret	AUT	ITA	USA				N/A	N/A
1973	Milk Marketing Board - Ford Motor Co	Ford Escort RS 1600 MKI												GBR; Ret	FRA		N/A	N/A
1974	Hannu Mikkola	Peugeot 504	POR	KEN; Ret													N/A	N/A
1974	Ford Motor Co Ltd	Ford Escort RS 1600 MKI			FIN; 1	ITA	CAN	USA	GBR; Ret	FRA							N/A	N/A
1975	Fiat Rally	Fiat 124 Abarth Rallye	MON; 2														N/A	N/A
1975	Hannu Mikkola	Fiat 124 Abarth Rallye		SWE; Ret				POR; 2									N/A	N/A
1975	Hannu Mikkola	Peugeot 504			KEN; Ret	GRE	MOR; 1										N/A	N/A
1975	HM-Racing	Toyota Corolla Levin TE 27							FIN; 1	ITA	FRA						N/A	N/A
1975	Toyota	Toyota Celica										GBR; Ret					N/A	N/A
1976	Hannu Mikkola	Opel Kadett GT/E	MON; Ret	SWE													N/A	N/A
1976	Hannu Mikkola	Toyota Corolla Levin TE 27			POR; Ret		GRE; Ret										N/A	N/A
1976	Hannu Mikkola	Peugeot 504 V6 Coupé				KEN; Ret		MOR; Ret									N/A	N/A
1976	HM-Racing	Toyota Celica 2000 GT							FIN; 3	ITA							N/A	N/A
1976	Toyota Team Great Britain	Toyota Celica 2000 GT										GBR; Ret					N/A	N/A
1976	Hannu Mikkola	Peugeot 104 ZS									FRA; 10						N/A	N/A
1977	Hannu Mikkola	Toyota Corolla Levin TE 27	MON	SWE; Ret													N/A	N/A
1977	Hannu Mikkola	Toyota Celica 2000 GT			POR; Ret			GRE; Ret	FIN; Ret	CAN	ITA	FRA	GBR; 2				N/A	N/A
1977	Hannu Mikkola	Peugeot 504				KEN; Ret	NZL										N/A	N/A
1978	Hannu Mikkola	Ford Escort RS 1800 MKII	MON	SWE; 2	KEN	POR; 2	GRE										3rd	30
1978	Ford Motor Co Ltd	Ford Escort RS 1800 MKII						FIN; Ret	CAN	ITA	CIV	FRA					3rd	30
1978	Eaton Yale	Ford Escort RS 1800 MKII											GBR; 1				3rd	30
1979	Ford Motor Co Ltd	Ford Escort RS 1800 MKII	MON; 5	SWE; 5	POR; 1				FIN; Ret	CAN	ITA	FRA	GBR; 1				2nd	111
1979	D.T. Dobie / Daimler-Benz	Mercedes-Benz 450 SLC				KEN; 2								CIV; 1			2nd	111
1979	Rothmans Rally Team	Ford Escort RS 1800 MKII					GRE; Ret										2nd	111
1979	Masport	Ford Escort RS 1800 MKII						NZL; 1									2nd	111
1980	Esso	Porsche 911 SC	MON; Ret														2nd	64
1980	Rothmans Rally Team	Ford Escort RS 1800 MKII		SWE; 4	POR; Ret		GRC; Ret				ITA; 3	FRA	GBR; 2				2nd	64
1980	D.T. Dobie / Daimler-Benz	Mercedes-Benz 450 SLC				KEN; Ret		ARG; 2		NZL; 3				CIV; Ret			2nd	64
1980	Toyota Team Europe	Toyota Celica 2000 GT							FIN; Ret								2nd	64
1981	Audi Sport GmbH	Audi Quattro	MON; Ret	SWE; 1	POR; Ret	KEN	FRA; Ret	GRC; Ret	ARG	BRA	FIN; 3	ITA; 4	CIV	GBR; 1			3rd	62
1982	Audi Sport GmbH	Audi Quattro	MON; 2	SWE; 16	POR; Ret	KEN	FRA; Ret	GRC; Ret	NZL; Ret	BRA; Ret	FIN; 1	ITA; 2	CIV; Ret	GBR; 1			3rd	70
1983	Audi Sport GmbH	Audi Quattro A1	MON; 4	SWE; 1	POR; 1	KEN; 2											1st	125
1983	Audi Sport GmbH	Audi Quattro A2					FRA; Ret	GRC; Ret	NZL; Ret	ARG; 1	FIN; 1	ITA; Ret	CIV; 2	GBR; 2			1st	125
1984	HB Audi Team	Audi Quattro A2	MON; 3	SWE	POR; 1	KEN; 3	FRA	GRE; 2	NZL; 3	ARG; 2		ITA	CIV; 2	GBR; 2			2nd	104
1984	HB Audi Team	Audi Quattro Sport									FIN; Ret						2nd	104
1985	HB Audi Team	Audi Quattro Sport	MON	SWE; 4	POR	KEN; Ret	FRA	GRC	NZL	ARG							22nd	10
1985	HB Audi Team	Audi Quattro Sport E2									FIN; Ret	ITA	CIV	GBR; Ret			22nd	10
1986	HB Audi Team	Audi Quattro Sport E2	MON; 3	SWE	POR	KEN	FRA	GRE	NZL	ARG	FIN	CIV	ITA	GBR	USA		18th	12
1987	HB Audi Team	Audi 200 Quattro	MON	SWE	POR	KEN; 1	FRA	GRE; 3	USA	NZL	ARG	FIN; Ret	CIV	ITA	GBR		8th	32
1988	Mazda Rally Team Europe	Mazda 323 4WD	MON; Ret	SWE; Ret	POR; 4			GRC; Ret	USA	NZL	ARG	FIN; Ret	CIV	ITA	GBR; Ret		30th	10
1988	GM Euro Sport	Opel Kadett GSI				KEN; Ret	FRA										30th	10
1989	Mazda Rally Team Europe	Mazda 323 4WD	SWE	MON; 4	POR	KEN	FRA	GRC	NZL	ARG	FIN; Ret	AUS	ITA	CIV	GBR; 9		27th	12
1990	Mazda Rally Team Europe	Mazda 323 4WD	MON; Ret	POR; 6	KEN	FRA	GRC	NZL	ARG	FIN; Ret	AUS	ITA	CIV				34th	6
1990	Mazda Rally Team Europe	Mazda 323 GTX												GBR; Ret			34th	6
1991	Mazda Rally Team Europe	Mazda 323 GTX	MON; Ret	SWE; 7	POR; Ret	KEN	FRA	GRE; 8	NZL	ARG	FIN; Ret	AUS	ITA	CIV	ESP	GBR; 7	25th	11
1993	555 Subaru World Rally Team	Subaru Legacy RS	MON	SWE; Ret	POR	KEN	FRA	GRC	ARG	NZL							38th	4
1993	Toyota Castrol Team	Toyota Celica Turbo 4WD									FIN; 7	AUS	ITA	ESP			38th	4

=== Complete British Saloon Car Championship results ===
(key) (Races in bold indicate pole position; races in italics indicate fastest lap.)

Year	Team	Car	Class	1	2	3	4	5	6	7	8	9	10	11	12	Pos.	Pts	Class
1969	British Vita Racing	Ford Escort TC	C	BRH	SIL	SNE	THR	SIL	CRY	MAL	CRO	SIL	OUL	BRH	BRH ovr:5 cls:3	35th	4	10th
1970	British Vita Racing	Ford Escort TC	C	BRH	SNE	THR	SIL	CRY	SIL	SIL	CRO	BRH	OUL	BRH; Ret	BRH	NC	0	NC

Sporting positions
Preceded by Walter Röhrl	World Rally Champion; 1983	Succeeded by Stig Blomqvist
Records
Preceded by Björn Waldegård; 11 wins (1973–1992)	Most rally wins 18 wins, 12th at the 1982 RAC Rally	Succeeded by Markku Alén; 19 wins, 19th at the 1988 RAC Rally
