= 1973 RAC Rally =

Rally car race

1973 RAC Rally 22nd Daily Mirror RAC Rally
Round 12 of the 1973 World Rally Championship season
← Previous event	Next event →
- Host country: United Kingdom
- Rally base: York, England
- Dates run: 17 November 1973 – 21 November 1973
- Stages: 80 (540.02 km; 335.55 miles)
- Stage surface: Gravel with some asphalt
- Overall distance: 3,020 km (1,880 miles)

Statistics
- Crews: 198 at start, 91 at finish

Overall results
- Overall winner: (Finland) Timo Mäkinen (United Kingdom) Henry Liddon (United States) Ford Motorsport; Ford Escort RS1600

The 1973 RAC Rally (formally the 22nd Daily Mirror RAC Rally) was the twelfth round of the inaugural World Rally Championship season. Run in mid-November in the County of Yorkshire in England, the rally was run primarily on gravel, with some sections of tarmac as well. The rally carried the name of its title sponsor, a popular British newspaper, The Daily Mirror.

== Report ==
In 1973, and for several years afterward, only manufacturers were given points for finishes in WRC events. Britain was home terrain for the Fords and the RS1600 wrapped up all three podium spots. While both Alpine Renault and Fiat finished in the points, they could only count their best eight results and thus their finishes at the RAC Rally were discounted. The two nonetheless finished first and second overall in the Championship.

== Results ==
1973 RAC Rally results
Finish	Total time	Group	Car #	Driver Co-driver	Car	Mfr. points
1	6 h : 47 m : 8 s	2	13	(Finland) Timo Mäkinen (United Kingdom) Henry Liddon	(United Kingdom) Ford Escort RS1600	20
2	6 h : 52 m : 23 s	2	1	(United Kingdom) Roger Clark (United Kingdom) Tony Mason	(United Kingdom) Ford Escort RS1600	
3	6 h : 55 m : 26 s	2	18	(Finland) Markku Alén (Finland) Ilkka Kivimäki	(United Kingdom) Ford Escort RS1600	
4	7 h : 01 m : 13 s	2	31	(Sweden) Per-Inge Walfridsson (United Kingdom) John Jensen	(Sweden) Volvo 142	10
5	7 h : 03 m : 08 s	4	8	(France) Jean-Pierre Nicolas (France) Claude Roure	(France) Alpine-Renault A110 1800	
6	7 h : 05 m : 44 s	2	21	(Sweden) Gunnar Blomqvist (Sweden) Ingelöv Blomqvist	(Germany) Opel Ascona 19	6
7	7 h : 06 m : 14 s	2	4	(Sweden) Björn Waldegård (Sweden) Hans Thorszelius	(Germany) BMW 2002	4
8	7 h : 09 m : 19 s	2	29	(Sweden) Lars Carlsson (Germany) Peter Peterson	(Germany) Opel Ascona	
9	7 h : 09 m : 46 s	2	37	(United Kingdom) Tony Fowkes (United Kingdom) Bryan Harris	(United Kingdom) Ford Escort RS1600	
10	7 h : 10 m : 14 s	2	19	(Italy) Sergio Barbasio (Italy) Gino Macaluso	(Italy) Fiat Abarth 124 Rallye	
11	7 h : 10 m : 50 s	2	51	(Norway) Erik Aaby (Norway) Egil Moreite	(Germany) Opel Ascona SR	
12	7 h : 11 m : 17 s	2	9	(Sweden) Ove Andersson (United Kingdom) Geraint Phillips	(Japan) Toyota Celica	
13	7 h : 12 m : 37 s	2	46	(United Kingdom) Drew Gallacher (United Kingdom) Ian Muir	(United Kingdom) Ford Escort RS1600	
14	7 h : 14 m : 36 s	3	5	(Sweden) Harry Källström (Sweden) Claes Billstam	(Japan) Datsun 240Z	
15	7 h : 15 m : 58 s	2	11	(Germany) Achim Warmbold (France) Jean Todt	(Germany) BMW 2002 TII	
16	7 h : 19 m : 30 s	1	30	(Sweden) Bror Danielsson (Sweden) Ulf Sundberg	(Germany) BMW 2002	
17	7 h : 20 m : 22 s	2	45	(United Kingdom) Colin Malkin (United Kingdom) Brian Coyle	(United Kingdom) Hillman Avenger	
18	7 h : 25 m : 10 s	2	44	(United Kingdom) Donald Heggie (United Kingdom) George Dean	(United Kingdom) Ford Escort RS1600	
19	7 h : 26 m : 02 s	2	28	(Italy) Maurizio Verini (Italy) Ninni Russo	(Italy) Fiat Abarth 124 Rallye	
20	7 h : 32 m : 13 s	2	54	(Republic of Ireland) Billy Coleman (Republic of Ireland) Dan O'Sullivan	(United Kingdom) Ford Escort RS1600	
21	7 h : 32 m : 55 s	3	71	(United Kingdom) Kevin Videan (United Kingdom) Peter Rushforth	(Japan) Datsun 240Z	
22	7 h : 33 m : 30 s	1	52	(United Kingdom) Harold Morley (Canada) Bob Lindquist	(Germany) Porsche 911	
23	7 h : 36 m : 35 s	2	58	(United Kingdom) David Thompson (United Kingdom) Martin Welch	(United Kingdom) Ford Escort RS1600	
24	7 h : 38 m : 02 s	1	60	(United Kingdom) Andy Dawson (United Kingdom) Peter Valentine	(United Kingdom) Hillman Avenger	
25	7 h : 38 m : 07 s	2	117	(United Kingdom) Mike Jackson (United Kingdom) Ian Maxey	(United Kingdom) Ford Escort RS1600	
26	7 h : 39 m : 37 s	2	83	(United Kingdom) Steve Howard (United Kingdom) Richard Ward	(United Kingdom) Ford Escort RS1600	
27	7 h : 40 m : 33 s	1	75	(United Kingdom) John Bloxham (United Kingdom) Norman Salt	(United Kingdom) Hillman Avenger	
28	7 h : 40 m : 42 s	1	61	(United Kingdom) Bob Bean (United Kingdom) David Greenwood	(United Kingdom) Ford Escort Mexico	
29	7 h : 42 m : 02 s	4	84	(United Kingdom) Pip Dale (United Kingdom) Richard Stark	(United Kingdom) Vauxhall Firenza	
30	7 h : 44 m : 02 s	2	121	(United Kingdom) Edward Hurley (United Kingdom) Simon Bretherton	(United Kingdom) Ford Escort RS1600	
31	7 h : 46 m : 56 s	2	67	(United Kingdom) Frank Pierson (United Kingdom) Colin Francis	(United Kingdom) Ford Escort RS1600	
32	7 h : 48 m : 58 s	2	35	(Finland) Eeva Heinonen (Finland) Seija-Saaristo Kivistö	(Sweden) Volvo 142	
33	7 h : 50 m : 33 s	1	85	(United Kingdom) Ian Wilson (United Kingdom) Peter Anderson	(Germany) Opel Ascona	
34	7 h : 51 m : 10 s	1	126	(United Kingdom) John Midgley (United Kingdom) John Forrest	(Japan) Toyota Corolla	
35	7 h : 53 m : 51 s	1	81	(United Kingdom) Alan Conley (United Kingdom) Crawford Dunn	(United Kingdom) Chrysler Avenger	
36	7 h : 54 m : 23 s	2	62	(Republic of Ireland) Rosemary Smith (United Kingdom) Pauline Gullick	(United Kingdom) Ford Escort RS1600	
37	7 h : 55 m : 14 s	2	27	(Kenya) Shekhar Mehta (United Kingdom) Keith Wood	(Japan) Datsun Sunny	
38	8 h : 00 m : 56 s	2	113	(United Kingdom) John Baillie (United Kingdom) Robert Baillie	(United Kingdom) Ford Escort Twin Cam	
39	8 h : 01 m : 50 s	1	124	(United Kingdom) Roland Young (United Kingdom) Dave Cowell	(United Kingdom) Ford Escort Mexico	
40	8 h : 03 m : 40 s	1	66	(United Kingdom) Philip Cooper (United Kingdom) Tony Viles	(United Kingdom) Ford Escort Mexico	
41	8 h : 05 m : 04 s	1	102	(United Kingdom) David Hardcastle (United Kingdom) David West	(Germany) Opel Ascona SR	
42	8 h : 06 m : 18 s	2	154	(United Kingdom) Murray Grierson (United Kingdom) Roger Anderson	(United Kingdom) Ford Escort Mexico	
43	8 h : 06 m : 55 s	2	142	(United Kingdom) Stanley Griffin (United Kingdom) Christine Foster	(United Kingdom) Ford Escort RS1600	
44	8 h : 12 m : 37 s	2	176	(United Kingdom) Norman Anstiss (United Kingdom) John Haswell	(United Kingdom) Ford Escort RS1600	
45	8 h : 12 m : 45 s	2	141	(United Kingdom) John Cockerill (United Kingdom) John Lawson	(United Kingdom) Ford Escort RS1600	
46	8 h : 13 m : 42 s	1	59	(Netherlands) Wim Luijbregts (Netherlands) Kees Luijbregts	(Netherlands) DAF 66	
47	8 h : 17 m : 47 s	1	140	(United Kingdom) Gordon Jarvis (United Kingdom) John Bowie	(United Kingdom) Chrysler Avenger	
48	8 h : 19 m : 19 s	1	36	(France) Henri Greder (United Kingdom) Peter Jopp	(Germany) Opel Commodore GS/E	
49	8 h : 21 m : 26 s	1	131	(United Kingdom) David Finch (United Kingdom) Sidney Rudge	(United Kingdom) Ford Escort GT	
50	8 h : 22 m : 24 s	1	112	(Norway) Wenche Knudtzen (Sweden) Mats Adolfsson	(Soviet Union) Moskvitch 412	
51	8 h : 23 m : 03 s	1	165	(United Kingdom) Ian Beveridge (United Kingdom) David Lucas	(United Kingdom) Ford Escort GT	
52	8 h : 24 m : 19 s	1	188	(United Kingdom) James Haslegrave (United Kingdom) Richard Frew	(United Kingdom) Chrysler Avenger	
53	8 h : 24 m : 33 s	2	129	(United Kingdom) Peter Warren (United Kingdom) Dylis Rogers	(United Kingdom) Ford Escort Twin Cam	
54	8 h : 24 m : 34 s	1	169	(United Kingdom) David Warren (United Kingdom) Edward Norman	(United Kingdom) Ford Capri 3000	
55	8 h : 24 m : 59 s	1	139	(United Kingdom) Les Birkett (United Kingdom) Tony Blore	(United Kingdom) Morris Mini Cooper	
56	8 h : 25 m : 41 s	1	174	(United Kingdom) Paul Whatmuff (United Kingdom) Jeff Forrest	(Germany) Opel Ascona	
57	8 h : 25 m : 52 s	1	138	(United Kingdom) Chris Field (United Kingdom) Colin Goler	(United Kingdom) Chrysler Avenger	
58	8 h : 26 m : 38 s	1	104	(United Kingdom) Graham Booth (United Kingdom) Ian Woodruff	(Germany) Opel Manta	
59	8 h : 26 m : 43 s	1	145	(United Kingdom) Peter Doughty (United Kingdom) Richard Shelmedine	(United Kingdom) Ford Escort GT	
60	8 h : 26 m : 54 s	1	97	(Denmark) Per Sandager-Holm (Denmark) Jan Warkentin	(Sweden) Volvo	
61	8 h : 27 m : 03 s	4	118	(Belgium) Jean-Marie Didi (Belgium) Alain Lopes	(Italy) Fiat 124 Spider	
62	8 h : 31 m : 04 s	1	78	(East Germany) Peter Hommel (East Germany) Günter Bork	(East Germany) Wartburg 353	
63	8 h : 31 m : 45 s	1	149	(United Kingdom) Jim Clark (United Kingdom) Alan Smith	(United Kingdom) Vauxhall Firenza	
64	8 h : 32 m : 38 s	1	166	(United Kingdom) Michael Howells (United Kingdom) Malcolm Hamer	(United Kingdom) Morris Mini Cooper	
65	8 h : 34 m : 28 s	1	153	(United Kingdom) Michael Sutcliffe (United Kingdom) Deryck Pickup	(United Kingdom) Ford Escort Sport	
66	8 h : 38 s : 00 s	2	168	(United Kingdom) Timothy Walton (United Kingdom) Graham Marlow	(United Kingdom) Sunbeam Tiger	
67	8 h : 38 s : 37 s	2	80	(East Germany) Egon Culmbacher (East Germany) Werner Ernst	(East Germany) Wartburg 353	
68	8 h : 39 s : 48 s	2	132	(United Kingdom) Trevor Shaw (United Kingdom) Frederick-George Humphrey	(United Kingdom) Ford Escort RS1600	
69	8 h : 40 m : 07 s	1	123	(United Kingdom) B. Westerman	(United Kingdom) Chrysler Avenger	
70	8 h : 41 m : 12 s	1	155	(United Kingdom) Callum Barney (United Kingdom) Michael Smith	(Czechoslovakia) Škoda 110	
71	8 h : 42 m : 04 s	1	147	(United Kingdom) Rupert Jones (United Kingdom) John Wood	(United Kingdom) Ford Escort 1100	
72	8 h : 48 m : 36 s	2	189	(United Kingdom) John Williams (United Kingdom) Graham Samuel	(United Kingdom) Ford Escort Mexico	
72	8 h : 48 m : 36 s	1	87	(Netherlands) Thomas Meylink (United Kingdom) John Morgan	(Germany) Opel Ascona	
74	8 h : 48 m : 36 s	4	79	(France) Michel Guichard (France) Philippe Galilen	(France) Alpine-Renault A110 1300	
75	8 h : 49 m : 18 s	2	110	(United Kingdom) Sandy Lawson (United Kingdom) Geunda Carnie	(Netherlands) DAF 55	
76	8 h : 53 m : 44 s	1	162	(United Kingdom) Bill Bengry (United Kingdom) John Tolson	(United Kingdom) Chrysler Avenger	
77	8 h : 54 m : 29 s	2	170	(United Kingdom) Arthur Brick (United Kingdom) Roger Chilman	(United Kingdom) Ford Escort 1300 GT	
78	8 h : 55 m : 24 s	1	114	(Norway) Trine Jensen (United Kingdom) Frances Cobb	(United Kingdom) Ford Escort Mexico	
79	9 h : 01 m : 20 s	2	161	(United Kingdom) Mike Woolley (United Kingdom) Mark Kahn	(United Kingdom) Ford Escort Mexico	
80	9 h : 08 m : 17 s	2	181	(United Kingdom) Mike Rigg (United Kingdom) John Graham	(United Kingdom) Mini Cooper S	
81	9 h : 11 m : 15 s	2	137	(United Kingdom) Clifford Wrigley (United Kingdom) Peter Allworthy	(United Kingdom) Morris Mini	
82	9 h : 13 m : 24 s	1	200	(United Kingdom) Robert Pearson (United Kingdom) Michael Perkins	(United Kingdom) Vauxhall Firenza	
83	9 h : 14 m : 44 s	1	187	(United Kingdom) Timothy Tyrer (United Kingdom) Ralph Whitby	(Japan) Mazda RX-3	
84	9 h : 17 m : 15 s	4	130	(United Kingdom) Derek Skinner (United Kingdom) Les Allfrey	(United Kingdom) MG B	
85	9 h : 18 m : 01 s	2	199	(United Kingdom) David Robbins (United Kingdom) John Best	(United Kingdom) Chrysler Avenger	
86	9 h : 19 m : 59 s	1	148	(United Kingdom) William Sutton (United Kingdom) Charles Gilbert	(Italy) Lancia Fulvia 1.6 Coupé HF	
87	9 h : 35 m : 39 s	1	109	(United Kingdom) Patrick Leeson (Belgium) Eric Symens	(United Kingdom) Vauxhall Firenza	
88	9 h : 36 m : 10 s	2	180	(United Kingdom) Ian McGarva (United Kingdom) Dave Greenslade	(United Kingdom) Ford Escort Twin Cam	
89	9 h : 55 m : 55 s	2	182	(United Kingdom) Dick Newsum (United Kingdom) Tim Beall	(Netherlands) DAF 55	
90	9 h : 59 m : 59 s	2	198	(United Kingdom) Ian Adams (United Kingdom) John Porter	(United Kingdom) Ford Escort GT	
91	10 h : 24 m : 54 s	2	173	(United Kingdom) John Lacey (United Kingdom) George Harris	(United Kingdom) Mini 850	
Retired (Accident)		2	2	(Sweden) Stig Blomqvist (Sweden) Arne Hertz	(Sweden) Saab 96 V4	
Retired (Distributor)		4	3	(France) Jean-Luc Thérier (France) Michel Vial	(France) Alpine-Renault A110 1800	
Retired (Accident)		2	6	(Finland) Hannu Mikkola (United Kingdom) John Davenport	(United Kingdom) Ford Escort RS 1600 MKI	
Retired (Suspension)		2	7	(Sweden) Per Eklund (Sweden) Bo Reinicke	(Sweden) Saab 96 V4	
Retired (Engine valve)		2	10	(Finland) Rauno Aaltonen (United Kingdom) Paul Easter	(Germany) Opel Ascona A 1900	
Retired (Engine)		2	12	(Sweden) Ove Eriksson (Sweden) Björn Cederberg	(Germany) Opel Ascona A 1900	
Retired (Engine)		2	14	(Finland) Simo Lampinen (Sweden) Sölve Andreasson	(Sweden) Saab 96 V4	
Retired (Accident)		2	15	(Sweden) Anders Kulläng (Sweden) Donald Karlsson	(Germany) Opel Ascona A 1900	
Retired (Accident)		2	16	(Italy) Amilcare Ballestrieri (Italy) Silvio Maiga	(Italy) Lancia Fulvia 1.6 Coupé HF	
Retired (Accident)		4	17	(United Kingdom) Tony Fall (United Kingdom) Mike Wood	(Japan) Datsun 240Z	
Retired (Halfshaft)		4	20	(United Kingdom) Andrew Cowan (United Kingdom) Johnstone Syer	(United Kingdom) Ford Escort RS1600 MKI	
Retired (Accident)		4	22	(United Kingdom) Chris Sclater (United Kingdom) Martin Holmes	(Japan) Datsun 240Z	
Retired		2	23	(Sweden) Leif Asterhag (Sweden) Anders Gullberg	(Japan) Toyota Celica	
Retired (Exhaudt)		2	24	(Finland) Tapio Rainio (Finland) Klaus Lehto	(Sweden) Saab 96 V4	
Retired		2	25	(United Kingdom) Adrian Boyd (United Kingdom) Robert McBurney	(United Kingdom) Ford Escort RS1600 MKI	
Retired (Oil Pump)		2	26	(Germany) Walter Röhrl (Germany) Jochen Berger	(Germany) Opel Ascona 1.9 SR	
Retired		4	32	(United Kingdom) Jack Tordoff (United Kingdom) Phil Short	(Germany) Porsche 911 Carrera RS 2.7	
Retired		2	33	(Kenya) Vic Preston Jr. (United Kingdom) Paul White	(United Kingdom) Ford Escort RS1600 MKI	
Retired		2	34	(Sweden) Inge Per Solden (Sweden) Torsten Svennberg	(Sweden) Volvo 164	
Retired		1	36	(France) Henri Greder (United Kingdom) Peter Jopp	(Germany) Opel Commodore GS/E	
Retired		1	38	(Norway) Trond Schea (Norway) A. Per Bakke	(United Kingdom) Ford Escort Mexico	
Retired		1	39	(France) Marie-Claude Charmasson (France) Christine Giganot	(Germany) Opel Commodore GS/E	
Retired		1	40	(Germany) Holger Bohne (Germany) Franz-Josef Moormann	(Germany) Opel Commodore GS/E	
Retired (Accident)		2	41	(United Kingdom) Barry Lee (United Kingdom) John Gittins	(United Kingdom) Ford Escort RS1600 MKI	
Retired		2	42	(Sweden) Carl-Erik Larsson (Sweden) Fergus Sager	(Germany) Volkswagen 1302 S	
Retired (Engine)		1	43	(United Kingdom) Will Sparrow (United Kingdom) Nigel Raeburn	(United Kingdom) Vauxhall Firenza	
Retired (Accident)		4	47	(United Kingdom) Pat Moss-Carlsson (United Kingdom) Elizabeth Crellin	(France) Alpine-Renault A110 1800	
Retired (Accident)		2	48	(United Kingdom) Russell Brookes (United Kingdom) John Brown	(United Kingdom) Ford Escort RS1600 MKI	
Retired (Accident)		2	49	(United Kingdom) Paul Faulkner (United Kingdom) Monty Peters	(United Kingdom) Ford Escort RS1600 MKI	
Retired		2	50	(United Kingdom) Peter Clarke (United Kingdom) Brian Marchant	(United Kingdom) Ford Escort RS1600 MKI	
Retired (Driveshaft)		2	53	(Union of South Africa) Elbie Odendaal (Union of South Africa) Christo Kuun	(United Kingdom) Ford Escort RS1600 MKI	
Retired		1	55	(Netherlands) Eric Bessem (Netherlands) Bob Dickhout	(Netherlands) DAF 55	
Retired		2	56	(United Kingdom) Tony Drummond	(United Kingdom) Ford Escort RS1600 MKI	
Retired (Accident)		1	57	(United Kingdom) Robin Eyre-Maunsell (United Kingdom) Neil Wilson	(United Kingdom) Sunbeam Imp	
Retired		2	63	(United Kingdom) Paul Appleby (United Kingdom) Keith O'Dell	(United Kingdom) Ford Escort RS1600 MKI	
Retired		1	64	(United Kingdom) Roy Fidler (Netherlands) Bob de Jong	(United Kingdom) Chrysler Avenger	
Retired		2	65	(United Kingdom) Chris Beynon (United Kingdom) Lyn Andrews	(United Kingdom) Ford Escort Twin Cam	
Retired		2	68	(United Kingdom) Jill Robinson (United Kingdom) Jimmy Savile	(United Kingdom) Ford Escort Mexico	
Retired		2	69	(United Kingdom) Reg Mullenger (United Kingdom) Bill Barlow	(United Kingdom) Ford Escort RS1600 MKI	
Retired		4	70	(Portugal) Mario Figueiredo (Portugal) Carlos Barata	(Japan) Datsun 240Z	
Retired		2	72	(United Kingdom) Prince Michael of Kent (United Kingdom) Nigel Clarkson	(United Kingdom) Ford Escort RS	
Retired		4	73	(United Kingdom) George Hill (United Kingdom) Mike Broad	(United Kingdom) Vauxhall Firenza	
Retired		1	74	(Finland) Juhani Länsikorp (Finland) Leif Malmström	(Sweden) Saab V4	
Retired		2	76	(United Kingdom) Colin Grewer (United Kingdom) Don Griffiths	(Sweden) Volvo 131	
Retired		2	77	(Sweden) Gunnar Nordström (Sweden) Curt Göransson	(Germany) BMW 2002	
Retired		2	82	(United Kingdom) Roger Platt (United Kingdom) Tom Seal	(United Kingdom) Morris Mini	
Retired		1	86	(East Germany) Horst Niebergall (East Germany) Bernhard Malsch	(East Germany) Wartburg 353	
Retired		2	88	(United Kingdom) Pat Mike (United Kingdom) Ryan Nicholson	(United Kingdom) Morris Marina	
Retired		4	89	(United Kingdom) David Thompson (United Kingdom) Maurice Isley	(United Kingdom) Vauxhall Firenza	
Retired		2	90	(Germany) Winfried Herrmann (Germany) Christa Herrmann	(Germany) Volkswagen	
Retired		1	91	(Finland) Curt Nelskylä (United Kingdom) Tony McMahon	(Germany) BMW 2002	
Retired		2	92	(Germany) Jürgen Freisler (Germany) Bernhard Eilert	(Germany) BMW 2002	
Retired		2	93	(United Kingdom) Michael Clarke (United Kingdom) John MacNeill	(United Kingdom) Ford Escort RS1600 MKI	
Retired (Halfshaft)		2	94	(United Kingdom) Colin Vandervell (United Kingdom) Andrew Marriott	(United Kingdom) Ford Escort RS1600 MKI	
Retired		4	95	(United Kingdom) Peter Thompson (United Kingdom) Ken Forster	(United Kingdom) Vauxhall Firenza	
Retired		4	96	(United Kingdom) Malcolm Harvey Ross (United Kingdom) C. L. Newman	(Germany) Porsche 911	
Retired		2	98	(Sweden) Sören Skanse (Sweden) Göran Frisk	(Sweden) Volvo	
Retired		1	99	(Germany) Joachim Knollmann (Germany) Manfred Drossel	(Germany) Opel Ascona	
Retired		2	101	(United Kingdom) George Beever (United Kingdom) Stuart France	(United Kingdom) Ford Escort RS1600 MKI	
Retired		1	103	(Germany) Wilhelm Lyding (Germany) Otto Karlsson Klemenz	(Germany) Opel Ascona	
Retired		2	105	(United Kingdom) Malcolm Wise (United Kingdom) Rod Palmer	(United Kingdom) Ford Escort Twin Cam	
Retired		2	106	(United Kingdom) Laurie Richards	(United Kingdom) Ford Escort	
Retired		1	107	(United Kingdom) Jennifer Nadin-Birrell (United Kingdom) Alexa Davenport	(France) Simca Rallye	
Retired		2	108	(United Kingdom) Keith Billows (United Kingdom) Don Davidson	(United Kingdom) Ford Escort Twin Cam	
Retired		1	109	(United Kingdom) Richard Hudson-Evans (United Kingdom) Terry Thorp	(France) Peugeot 304	
Retired		2	111	(United Kingdom) Chris Wathen (Canada) Brian Hillis	(United Kingdom) Ford Escort RS1600 MKI	
Retired		2	115	(United Kingdom) John Daker (United Kingdom) George Handley	(United Kingdom) Ford Escort RS1600 MKI	
Retired		2	116	(Finland) Fredric Donner (Finland) Jerry Walmstedt	(Germany) Opel Ascona	
Retired		2	119	(United Kingdom) Linda Jackson (United Kingdom) Sue Grant	(United Kingdom) Ford Escort	
Retired		1	120	(Poland) Marek Gierowski (United Kingdom) John Taylor	(Germany) Porsche 911 Carrera RS 2.7	
Retired		2	122	(United Kingdom) Keith Leckie (United Kingdom) Peter Robinson	(France) Renault 12 Gordini	
Retired		???	125	(Italy) Franco Occhetti (Italy) Francesco Costa	(Italy) Alfa Romeo	
Retired		2	127	(United Kingdom) John Price (United Kingdom) Mervyn Gerrish	(France) Renault 17 TS	
Retired		1	128	(United Kingdom) Thomas Leake (United Kingdom) Kenneth Evans	(France) Simca Rallye	
Retired		1	133	(Sweden) Torgny Nyström (United Kingdom) Roger Squibb	(Sweden) Saab 96 V4	
Retired		1	134	(United Kingdom) John Clegg (United Kingdom) David Gregory	(United Kingdom) Chrysler Avenger	
Retired		2	135	(United Kingdom) David Palmby (United Kingdom) Mėlyna Hodgson	(United Kingdom) Ford Escort RS1600 MKI	
Retired		2	136	(United Kingdom) Roger Watson-Smyth (United Kingdom) Norman Jones	(France) Alpine-Renault A110 1600	
Retired		1	143	(United Kingdom) Ron Channon (United Kingdom) Anne Bertram	(United Kingdom) Ford Escort Mexico	
Retired		1	144	(United Kingdom) Martin Burgess (United Kingdom) Eddy Bamford	(United Kingdom) Ford Escort Mexico	
Retired		1	146	(United Kingdom) Peter Hall (United Kingdom) Allan Collins	(Italy) Fiat 128	
Retired		2	150	(United Kingdom) Graham Taylor (United Kingdom) Brian McLean	(United Kingdom) Ford Escort RS1600 MKI	
Retired		4	151	(United Kingdom) Peter Smith (United Kingdom) John Ingram	(France) Alpine-Renault A110 1600	
Retired		2	152	(United Kingdom) Geoffrey Awde (United Kingdom) Arthur Kaye	(Sweden) Saab 96 V4	
Retired		2	156	(United Kingdom) Michael Gilligan (United Kingdom) Ron Palmer	(United Kingdom) Ford Escort RS1600 MKI	
Retired		1	157	(United Kingdom) Peter Dalkin (United Kingdom) Peter Robertson	(France) Citroën GS	
Retired		1	158	(United Kingdom) John Harmer (United Kingdom) Anthony Thorne	(United Kingdom) Morris Mini	
Retired		1	159	(United Kingdom) James-Ronald Gray (United Kingdom) John Banks	(United Kingdom) Morris Mini	
Retired		1	160	(United Kingdom) Richard Wooldridge (United Kingdom) Duncan Spence	(United Kingdom) Ford Escort	
Retired		2	163	(United Kingdom) Mike Rawson (United Kingdom) Simon Davey	(Germany) Opel Ascona	
Retired		1	164	(United Kingdom) Ian Gemmell (United Kingdom) Iain Knox	(United Kingdom) Chrysler Avenger	
Retired		2	167	(United Kingdom) Patrick Sandeman (United Kingdom) Tony Phillips	(United Kingdom) Ford Escort Twin Cam	
Retired		1	171	(Norway) Arne Garvik (Norway) Geir Sveinsvoll	(Japan) Honda Civic	
Retired		4	172	(United Kingdom) Mark Ridout (United Kingdom) David Stephenson	(France) Alpine-Renault A110	
Retired		2	175	(United Kingdom) Dave May (United Kingdom) Bob Lamb	(United Kingdom) Ford Escort Twin Cam	
Retired		2	177	(United Kingdom) Martin Main (United Kingdom) Stuart Wild	(United Kingdom) Ford Escort Mexico	
Retired		2	178	(United Kingdom) Martin Hurst (United Kingdom) Julian Roderick	(United Kingdom) Ford Escort Mexico	
Retired		1	179	(United Kingdom) John Chatfield (United Kingdom) Alec Smith	(United Kingdom) Morris Mini	
Retired		2	183	(United Kingdom) Ray Holland (United Kingdom) Geoff Whittaker	(Germany) Opel Ascona	
Retired		1	184	(United Kingdom) David Brake (United Kingdom) Freda Brake	(United Kingdom) Hillman Imp	
Retired		2	185	(United Kingdom) Philip Wilks (United Kingdom) Denis Waller	(Sweden) Saab 96 V4	
Retired		1	186	(United Kingdom) George Barker (United Kingdom) Raymond Goodwin	(United Kingdom) Triumph	
Retired		1	190	(United Kingdom) Stephen Webster (United Kingdom) John Chadwick	(Italy) Fiat 124	
Retired		2	191	(United Kingdom) Roger Wood (United Kingdom) Roger Stripe	(United Kingdom) Ford Cortina	
Retired		2	192	(United Kingdom) Paul Hadley (United Kingdom) David Rabson	(Germany) Opel Ascona	
Retired		2	193	(United Kingdom) Roy Eyers (United Kingdom) Paul Claydon	(United Kingdom) Ford Escort Mexico MKI	
Retired		2	194	(United Kingdom) John Stephenson (United Kingdom) John Kitching	(United Kingdom) Ford Escort	
Retired		4	195	(United Kingdom) Richard Jackson (United Kingdom) Harry Heath	(Japan) Datsun 240Z	
Retired		1	196	(United Kingdom) Geoffrey Eteson (United Kingdom) Anthony Gregory	(United Kingdom) Hillman Imp	
Retired		1	197	(United Kingdom) Dennis Webster (United Kingdom) Dennis Haynes	(United Kingdom) Morris Mini	

Source: Independent WRC archive, eWRC Results

== Championship standings after the event ==
1973 World Rally Championship for Manufacturers points standings after round 12
After round 12		Team	Season end	
Position	Points	Team	Position	Points
1	127	(France) Alpine Renault	1	147
2	84	(Italy) Fiat	2	84
3	66	(United Kingdom) Ford	3	76
4	44	(Sweden) Volvo	4	44
5	42	(Sweden) Saab	5	42
6	34	(Japan) Datsun	6	34
7	33	(France) Citroën	7	33
8	28	(Germany) BMW	8	28
9	25	(Japan) Toyota	10	25
10	24	(Germany) Porsche	9	27
11	21	(Germany) Opel	11	25
12	18	(Poland) Polski Fiat	12	18
13	17	(Italy) Lancia	13	17
14	15	(East Germany) Wartburg	14	15
15	14	(Germany) Volkswagen	15	15
16	13	(France) Peugeot	16	13
17	4	(Japan) Mitsubishi	17	4
18	3	(Czechoslovakia) Škoda	18	3
19	1	(Germany) Audi	20	2
