= 1970 World Cup =

1970 World Cup may refer to:

- 1970 Alpine Skiing World Cup
- 1970 FIFA World Cup
- 1970 London to Mexico World Cup Rally
- 1970 Rugby League World Cup
- 1970 World Cup (men's golf)
