= Gunnar Palm =

Swedish rally co-driver

Gunnar Palm (born 25 February 1937, Kristinehamn) is a former Swedish rally co-driver. He is the brother of racer Torsten Palm. He lives with Gunilla Nilars.

== Racing career ==
Palm won the 1963 Monte Carlo Rally, co-driving for Erik Carlsson, in a Saab. The event was the first professional rally the pair entered. They went on to several top finishes during 1963 and 1964, in particular the East African Safari Rally and the Liège-Sofia-Liège rally.

Co-driving for Hannu Mikkola, in 1970 Palm won the 16,000 mi (26,000 km)-long World Cup Rally in a Ford Escort RS1600. In 1972, the duo won the Safari Rally, also in an Escort RS1600.

Palm collaborated with many of the world's most successful rally drivers, including Rauno Aaltonen, Ove Andersson, Tony Fall, Timo Mäkinen, Bengt Söderström , and Tom Trana. Palm co-drove with Söderström to win the 1967 European Rally Championship in a Lotus Cortina.

== After racing ==
In 1973, Palm quit racing, joining the public relations department of Ford. By 1999, he was director of Ford public relations in Sweden.

Palm has also served as a Formula One color commentator for Sveriges Television (SVT).

Palm was awarded the Prince's Motor Medal in 1996 by Prince Bertil's widow, Princess Lilian.

== Sources ==
- Rally Base.nl
- Motorsport Magazine
- Speed Hunters
- Robson, Graham. The Daily Mirror World Cup Rally 40: The World's Toughest Rally in Retrospect at Google Books (retrieved 24 July 2017)
- Connor, Robert. The 1968 London to Sydney Marathon: A History of the 10,000 Mile Endurance Rally at Google Books (retrieved 24 July 2017)
