= List of USA Cup winners =

This is a List of USA Cup Winners. The USA Cup is an annual floorball open event. Floorball is a type of floor hockey first played in the late 1960s.

Year	Elite
2012	
2011	(United States) FbC Dallas Fireballs

== See also ==
- USA Cup (floorball)
- Canada Cup (floorball)
- Czech Open (floorball)
- List of Czech Open winners
