= Triumph 2000 =

Triumph 2000, 2.5PI, 2500TC & 2500S
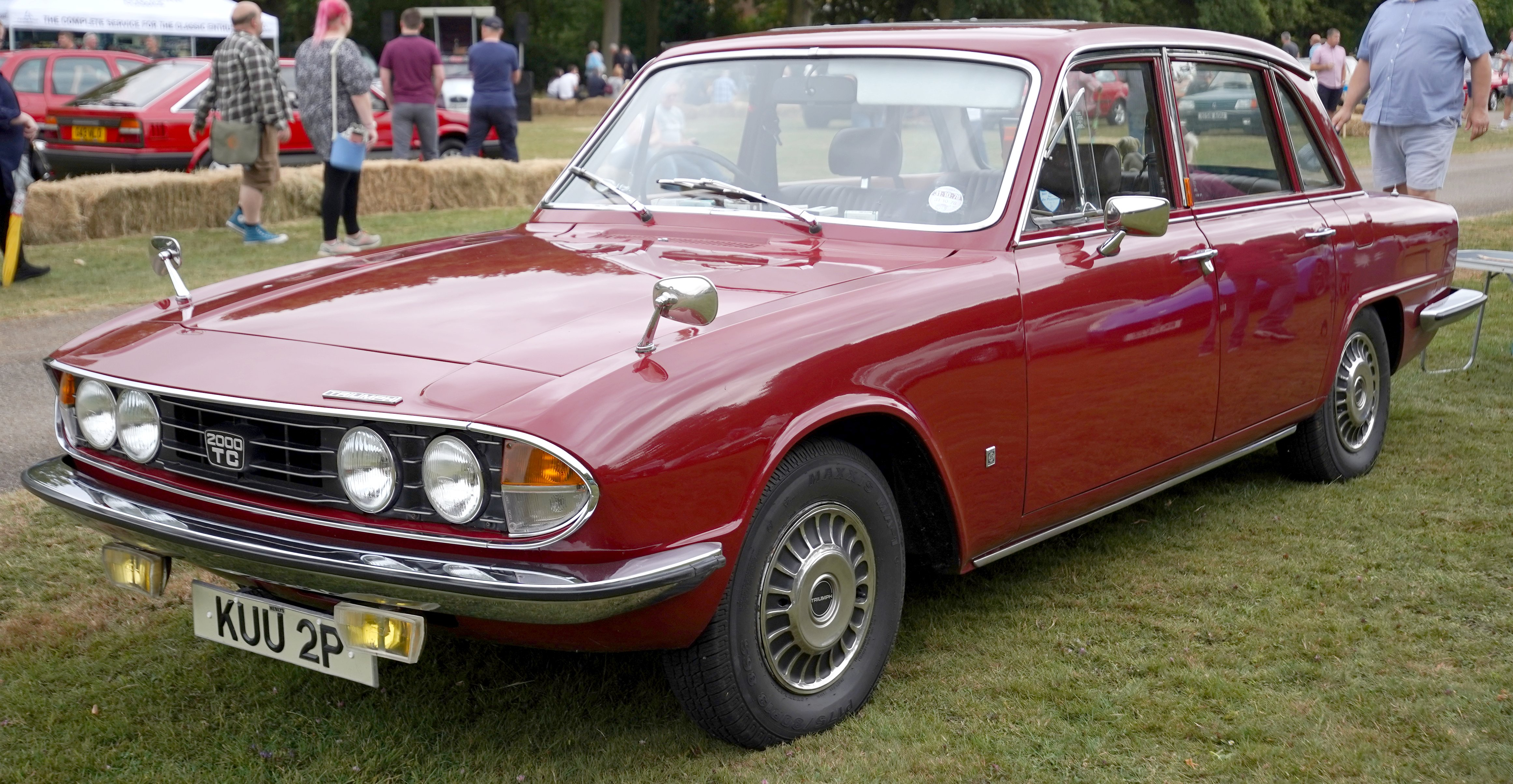
- Triumph 2000 Mk 2 Saloon

Overview
- Manufacturer: Triumph Motor Company
- Production: 1963–1977; 1964–1979 (New Zealand); 324,652 produced
- Assembly: United Kingdom: Canley, Coventry; Australia: Port Melbourne (AMI); Belgium: Mechelen; New Zealand: Christchurch; New Zealand: Nelson (NZMC); South Africa: Blackheath (Leykor)
- Designer: Giovanni Michelotti

Body and chassis
- Class: Mid-size executive car
- Body style: 4-door saloon 5-door estate
- Layout: Front-engine, rear-wheel-drive layout

Powertrain
- Engine: 1,998 cc (121.9 cu in) straight-6 (2000); 2,498 cc (152.4 cu in) straight-6 (2.5 PI, 2500TC & 2500S)
- Transmission: 4-speed manual 4-speed manual with overdrive 3-speed automatic

Dimensions
- Wheelbase: 106 in (2,692 mm)
- Length: 174 in (4,420 mm) Mk 1; 183 in (4,648 mm) Mk 2
- Width: 67 in (1,702 mm)
- Height: 56 in (1,422 mm)

Chronology
- Predecessor: Standard Vanguard
- Successor: Rover SD1

The Triumph 2000 is a mid-sized, rear wheel drive automobile which was produced in Coventry by the Triumph Motor Company between 1963 and 1977. It was introduced on 15 October 1963. It was styled by Giovanni Michelotti.

It competed with the contemporary Rover P6 2000, which initially was offered only with a four-cylinder engine. The Rover was also released in October 1963, just one week before the Triumph. Larger-engined models, known as the Triumph 2.5 PI and Triumph 2500 were also produced from 1968.

== Engine ==
The 2000 used the six-cylinder engine first seen in the Standard Vanguard at the end of 1960. However, the last of the six cylinder Vanguards had applied a compression ratio of 8.0:1 which the increasing availability of higher octane fuels enabled the manufacturers to increase to 8.5:1 for the Triumph. This and the fitting of twin Stromberg 150 CD carburettors made for a claimed power output increased to 90 bhp (67 kW; 91 PS) from the Vanguard's 80 bhp (60 kW; 81 PS).

== Running gear ==
Standard transmission on the original car was a 4-speed manual gearbox: overdrive and Borg-Warner Type 35 3-speed automatic transmission were options. The unitary body had independent suspension all-round with semi-trailing arms at the rear, all using coil springs. The servo-assisted brakes were disc at the front and drums at the rear.

== Triumph 2000 Mk 1 & 2.5 PI Mk 1 ==
Triumph 2000 Mk 1 Triumph 2.5 PI Mk 1
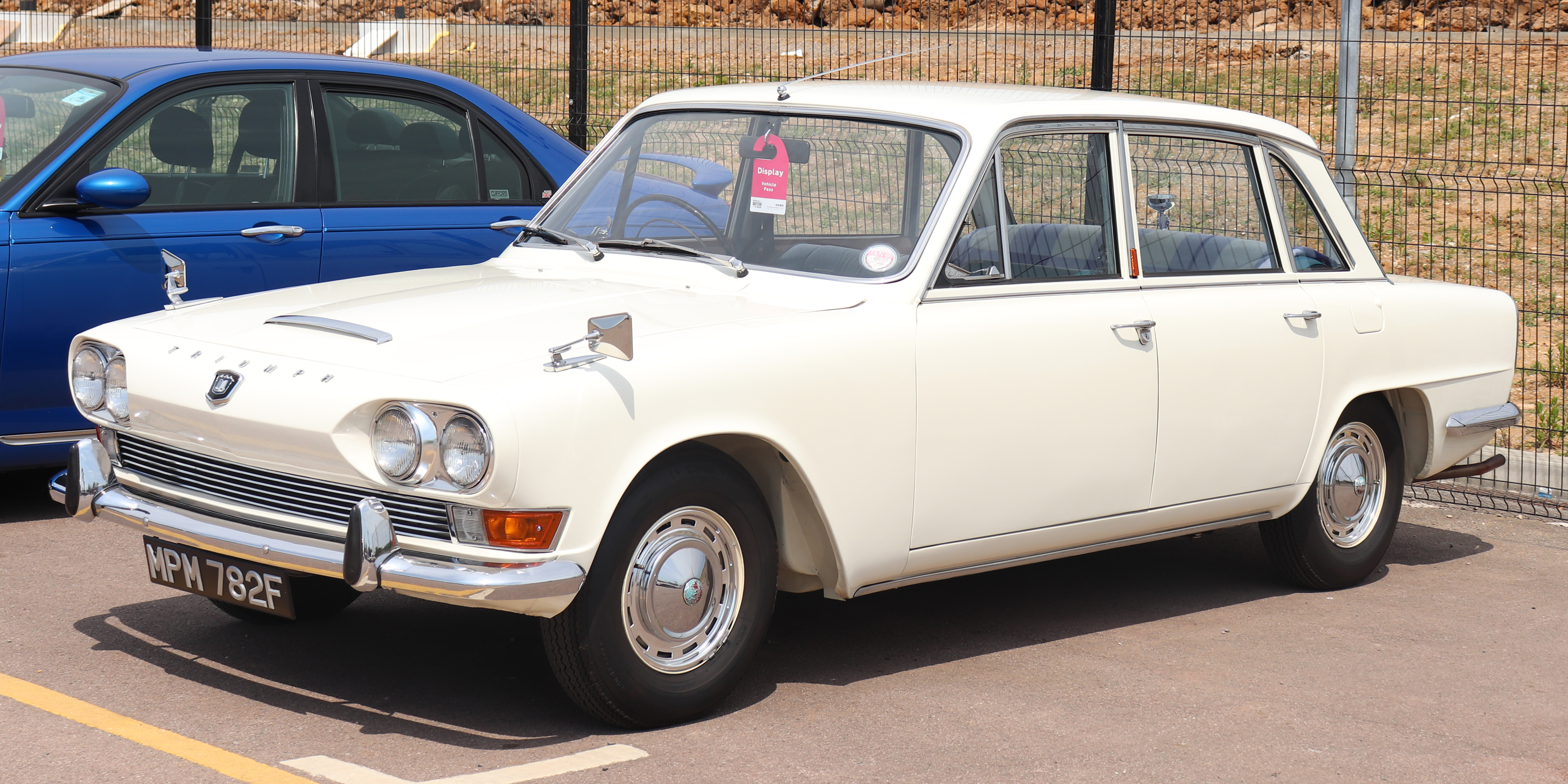
- 1967 Triumph 2000 Mk 1 Saloon

Overview
- Production: 1963–1969 (2000); 120,645 produced 1968–1969 (2.5 PI); 9,029 produced

Body and chassis
- Body style: 4-door saloon 5-door estate

Powertrain
- Engine: 1,998 cc I6 (2000); 2,498 cc I6 (2.5 PI)
- Transmission: 4-speed manual (with optional overdrive); 3-speed Borg-Warner T-35 automatic

The Mk 1 was presented to the public at the London Motor Show in October 1963, and volume sales began in January 1964. Continuing in production until 1969, this version came in saloon and, from 1965, estate forms. The estate car body shell was partly built by Carbodies, and in the Mk 1 version was the same length as the saloon. Various minor improvements were made during the period of which the most noteworthy, probably, was a significant upgrade in October 1966 to the "previously rather ineffective" ventilation, with eyeball vents added in the centre of the facia and the heater controls repositioned beneath them.

In October 1968 the 2.5 PI (petrol injection) Mk 1 was launched, fitted with a Lucas Automotive mechanical fuel injection system. Performance was very good, but the PI models (along with the TR6 models) gained a reputation for unreliability and poor fuel economy.

In Australia, these models suffered badly because of the summer heat. The electric fuel pump commonly overheated causing fuel to vaporise and render the engine inoperable until the pump cooled down. The overheating of the pump was caused by a combination of very high pressure fuel loads (over 110 psi (7.6 bar)) and a pump that was adapted from what was originally a windscreen wiper motor. As such, it did not cope well with sustained pressures in moderate to high ambient temperatures. Because of the launch late in the Mk I's life, there are relatively few PIs in the original shape.

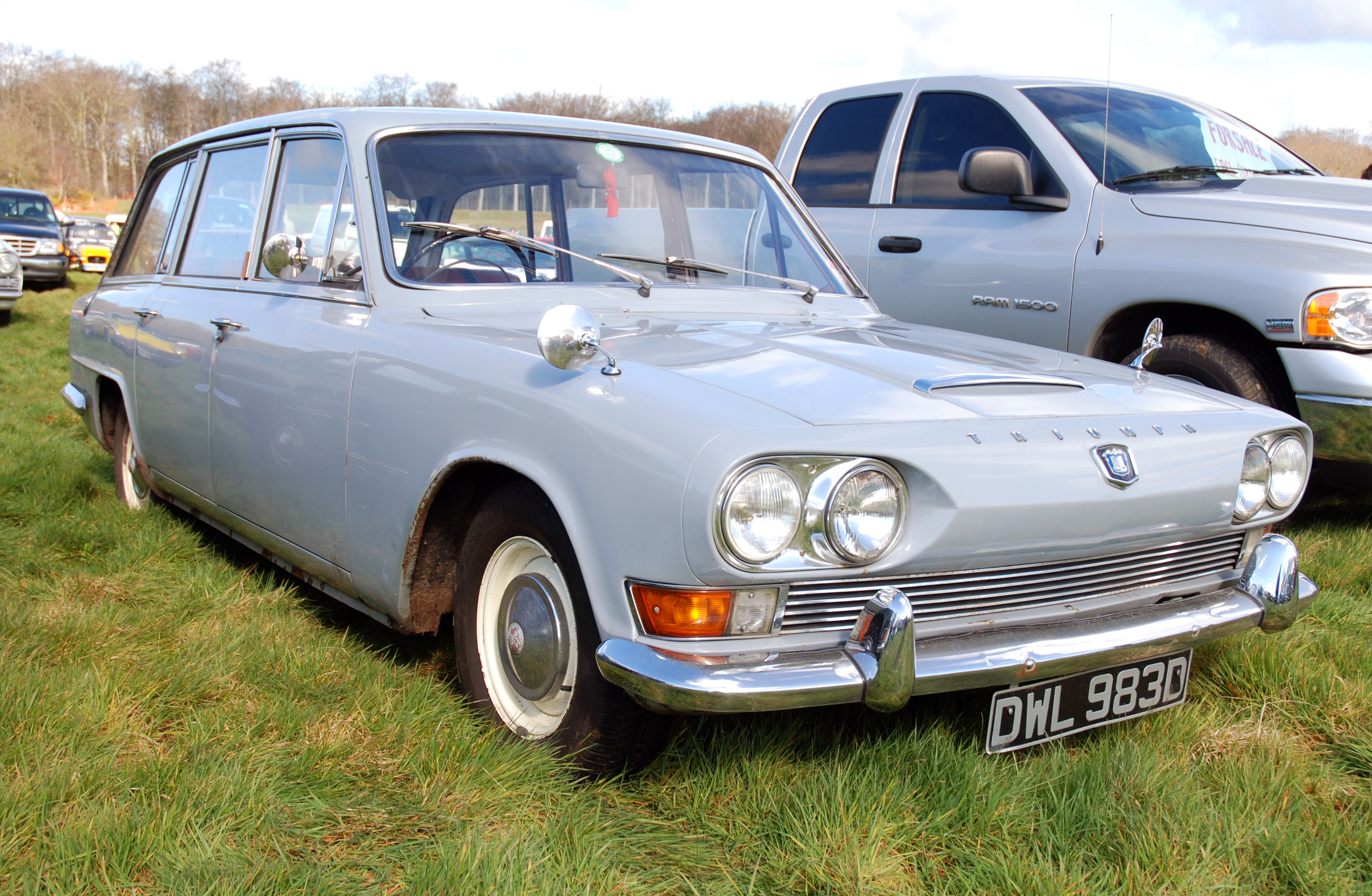
Triumph 2000 (Mk 1) Estate

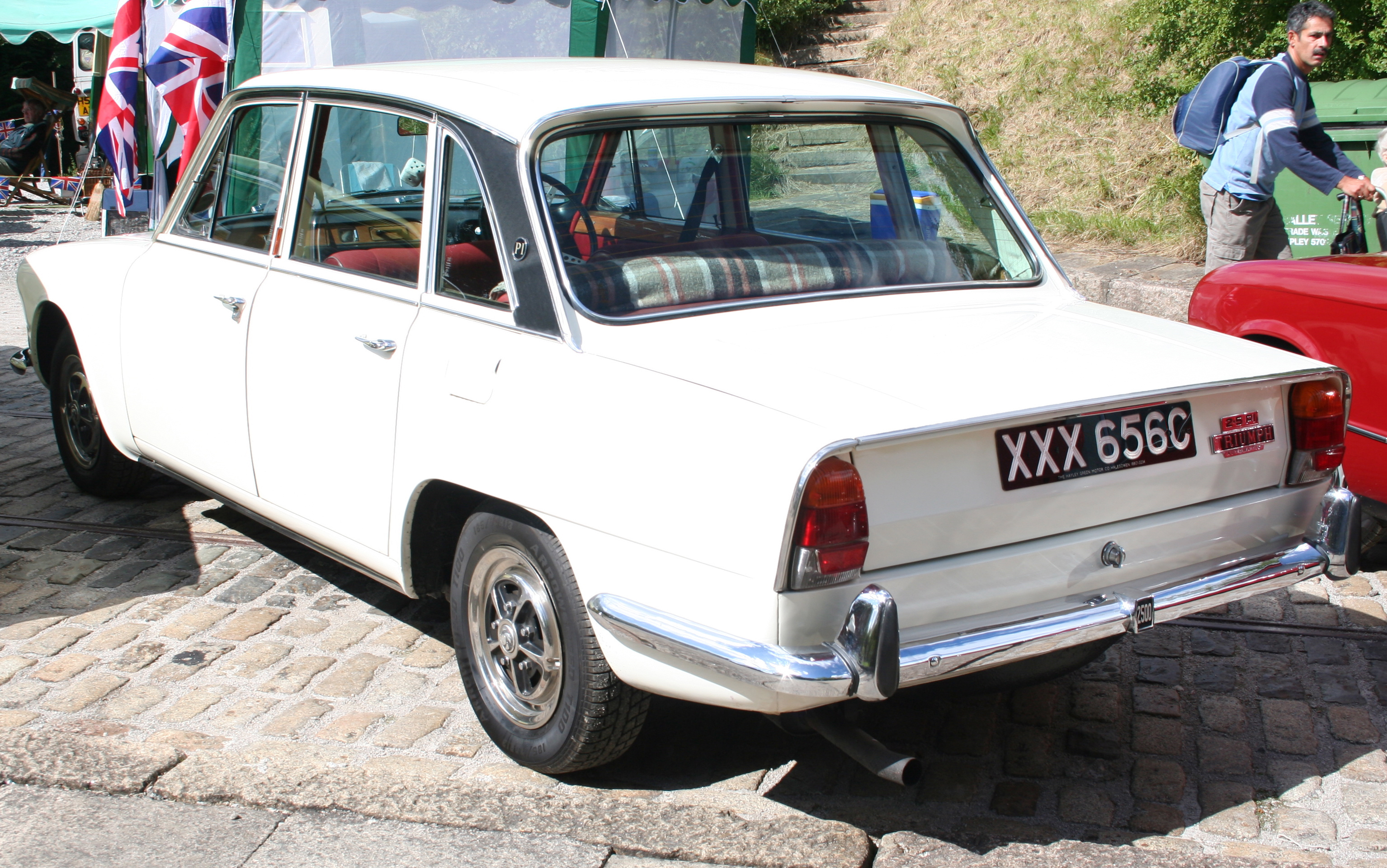
Triumph 2.5 PI Mk 1 Saloon

== Triumph 2000 Mk 2, 2.5 PI Mk 2, 2500TC and 2500S ==
Triumph 2000 Mk 2 Triumph 2.5 PI Mk 2 Triumph 2500TC Triumph 2500S
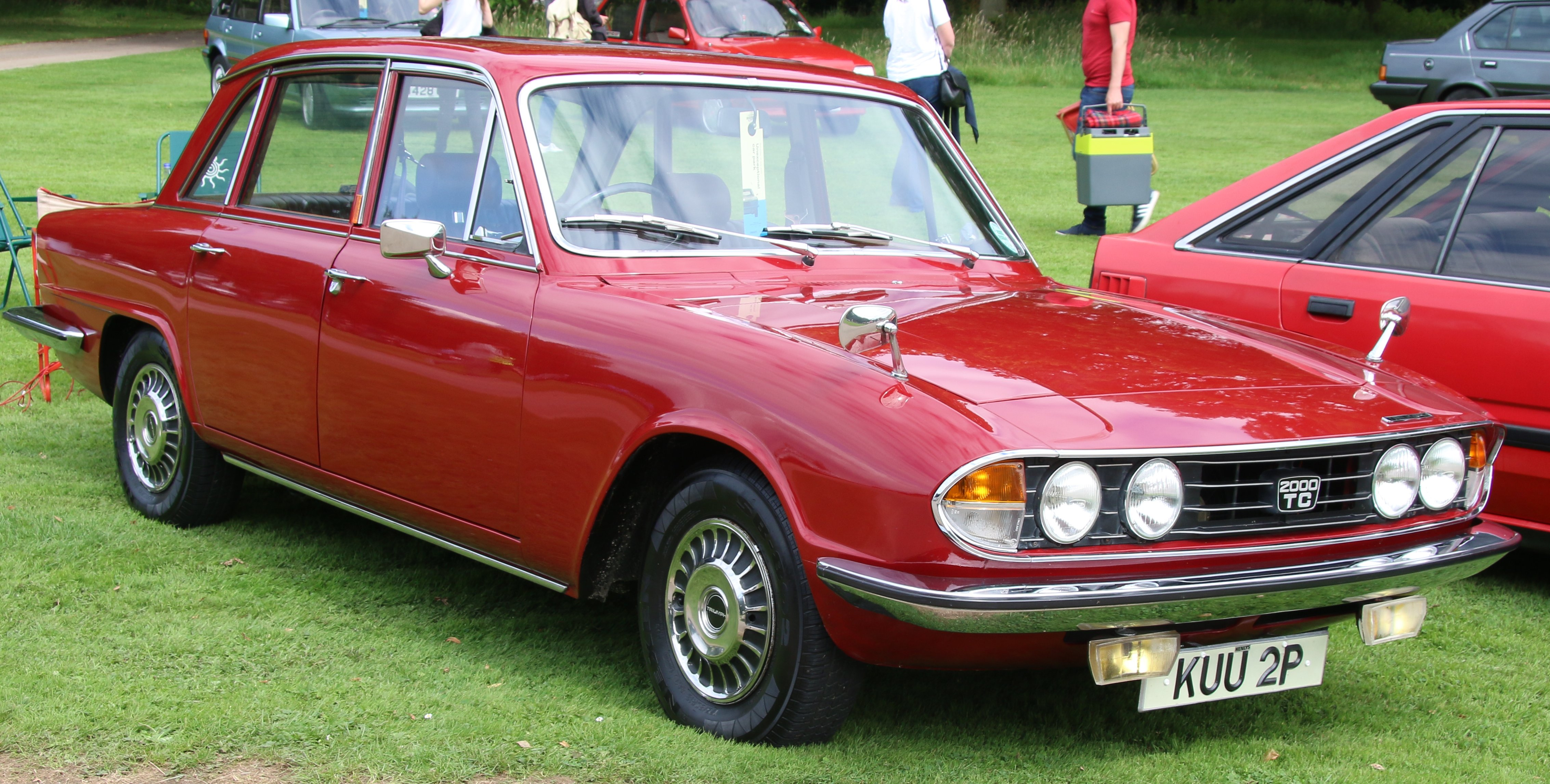
- 1976 Triumph 2000 TC Saloon

Overview
- Also called: Triumph Chicane (South Africa)
- Production: 1969–1977 (2000); 104,580 produced 1969–1975 (2.5 PI); 49,742 produced 1974–1977 (2500TC); 32,492 produced 1975–1977 (2500S); 8,164 produced

Body and chassis
- Body style: 4-door saloon 5-door estate

Powertrain
- Engine: 1,998 cc I6 (2000); 2,498 cc I6 (2.5 PI, 2500TC & 2500S)
- Transmission: 4-speed manual (with optional overdrive); 3-speed Borg-Warner T-35 automatic

In October 1969, the Mk 2 range was launched, styled, like its predecessor, by Michelotti, and preparing the car for the 1970s. The front of the car now followed the lines of the then-upcoming Triumph Stag grand tourer. There were entry-level 2000 models, which were the most plentiful, but the remainder of the range consisted of 2500, 2500 TC and 2500 PI models. Apart from the PI (petrol injection) models, all Triumph 2000 and 2500s had twin Stromberg or SU carburettors, the "TC" suffix on some models can seem misleading in this respect as it stood for a higher equipment level. In June 1975 the 2500S model, with 14 inch (356 mm) wheels and anti-roll bar, was added: it replaced the 2.5PI which had quietly disappeared from the show rooms two months earlier. This marked the end of fuel injected engines for the car, but improved acceleration was claimed for the twin carburettor 2500S and its slightly less expensive 2500TC sibling. These new versions featured an extensive list of other, mostly minor, improvements, of which the most significant were probably those affecting the ride and handling: these resulted from suspension changes including an anti-roll bar. The Estate in the Mk 2 version was 5 inches (125 mm) shorter than the Mk 2 Saloon, because the rear bodywork of the car was carried over unchanged from the Mk 1 version, and as with the Mk 1, built by Carbodies.

The Mk 2, the last big Triumph car, ceased production in 1977, supplanted by British Leyland's corporate executive car, the Rover SD1. Six-cylinder 2300 and 2600 versions of the new Rover would nonetheless be powered by engines designed by Triumph, originally intended to replace the older 2000 / 2500 units. The last production car, a 2500S estate (BOL87V) is kept at the Heritage Motor Centre.

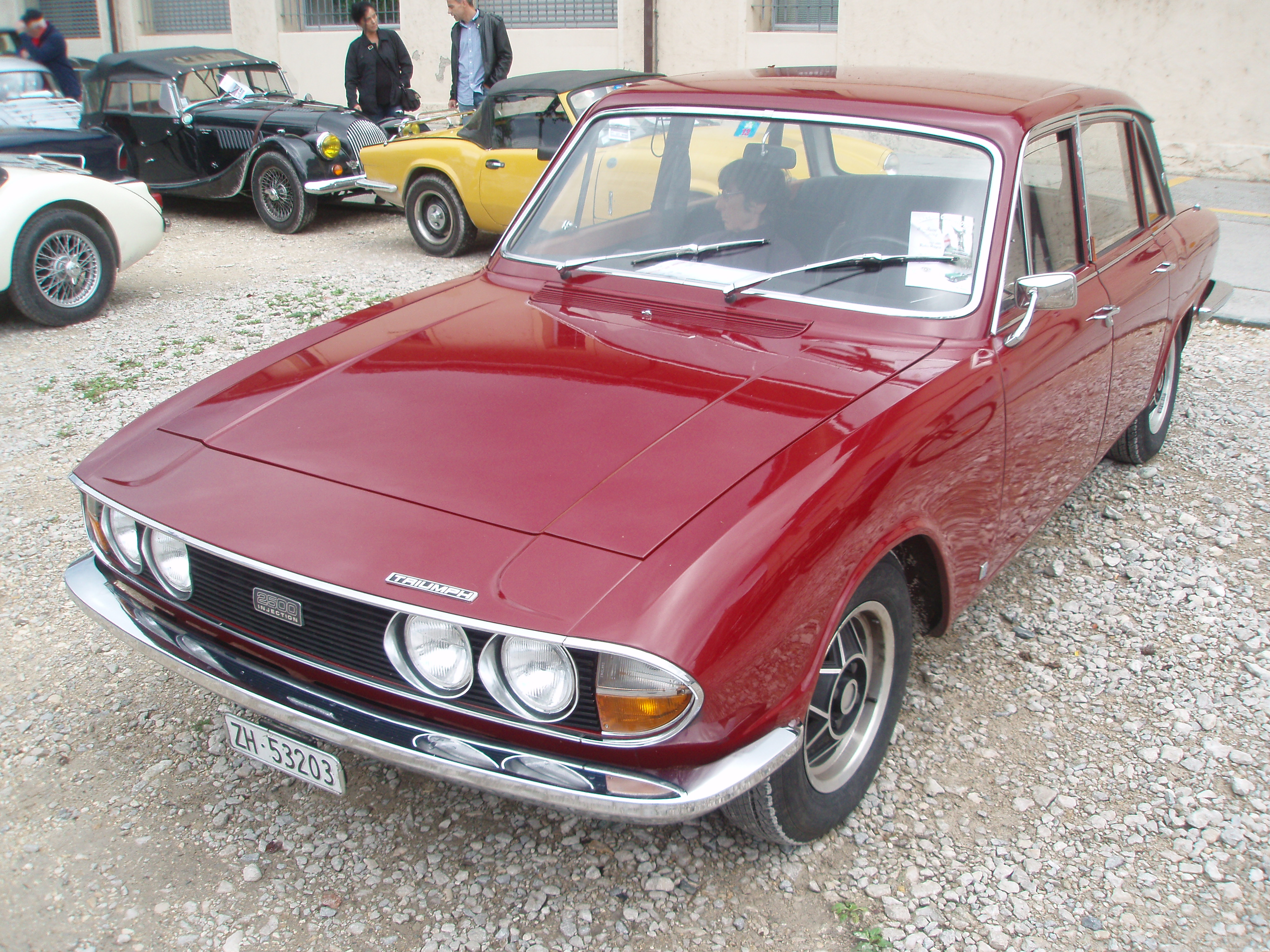
Triumph 2.5 PI Mk 2 Saloon

Triumph 2500TC Saloon

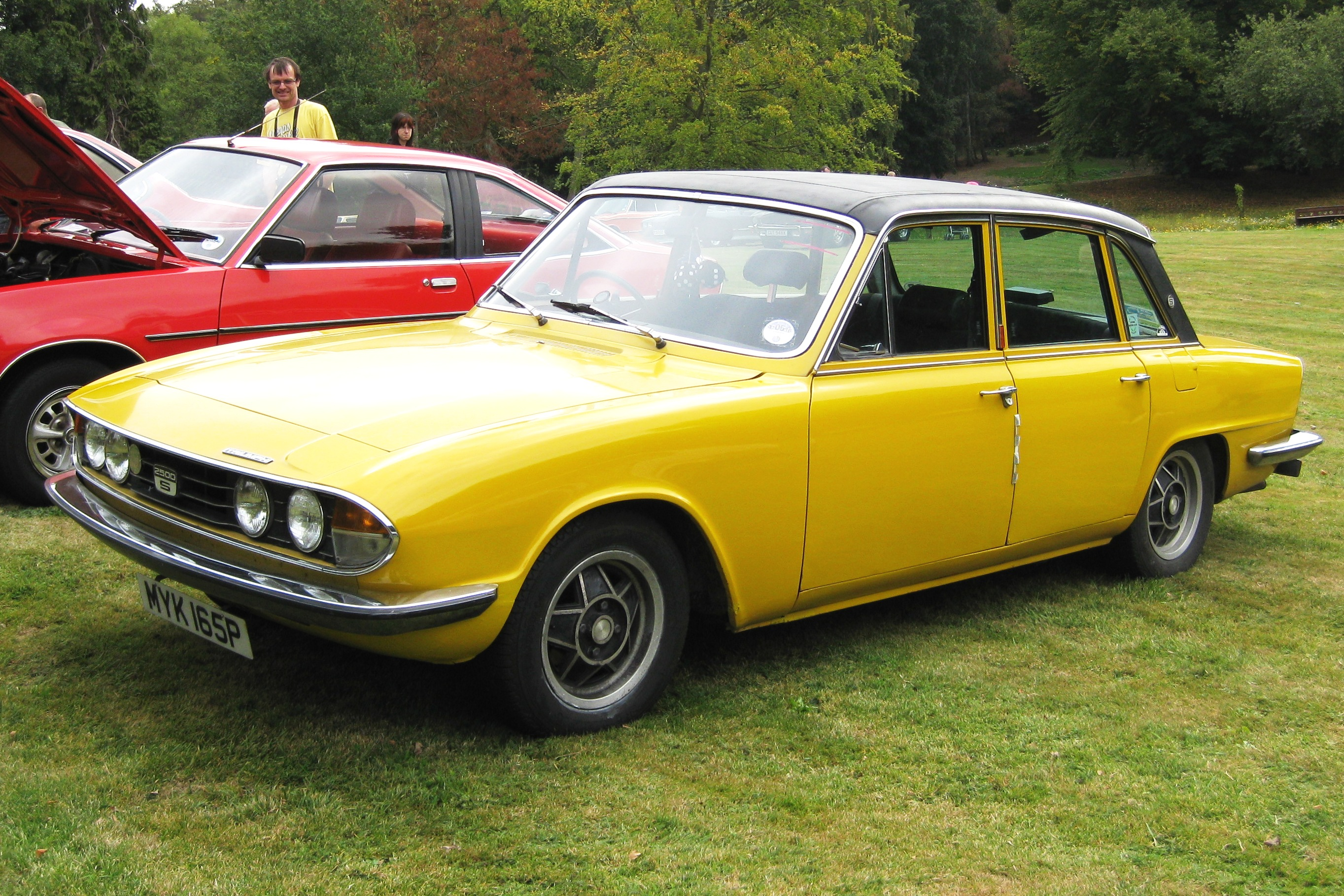
1976 Triumph 2500S Saloon

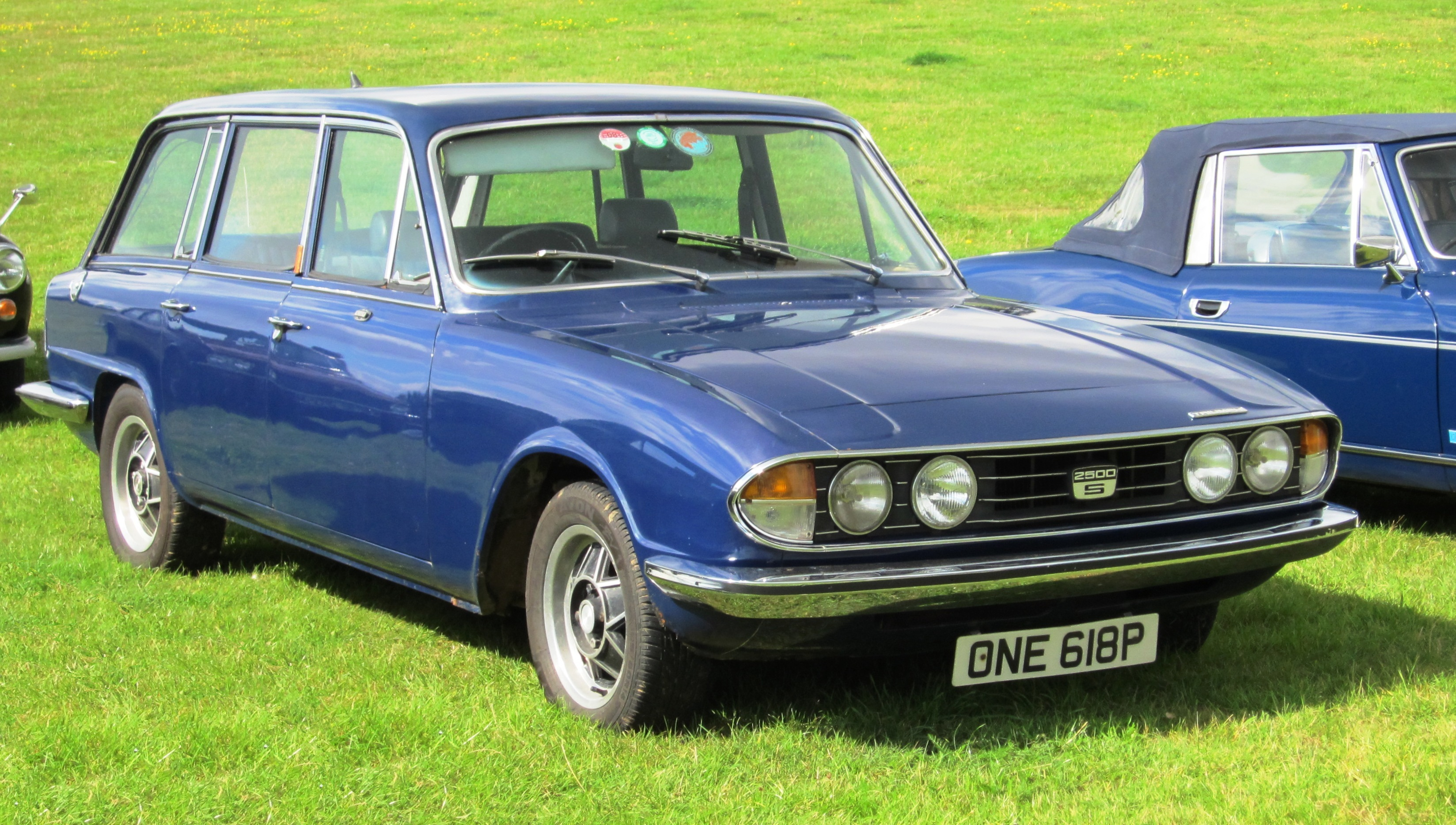
1976 Triumph 2500S Estate

== Overseas assembly ==
Various models were assembled in South Africa, with the later 2500TC and 2500S being badged Triumph Chicane in that market between 1973 and 1978.

In New Zealand, CKD production of the Triumph 2000 continued at New Zealand Motor Corporation's Nelson plant, with 2500S models until March 1979. Sir Rob Muldoon, New Zealand's then Prime Minister, privately owned a white 2500S and had been known to drive to work in it. This car is now owned by a member of the Auckland Triumph Car Club.

The 2000 was assembled in Australia by Australian Motor Industries. A special version of the Mk 1 was known as the 2000MD ("Managing Director"), which had special features such as knock-off wire wheels, triple Stromberg carburettors, and the battery moved to the boot. Total production of the 2000MD was approximately 100.

== Today ==
Many of these cars are still on the road, supported by owners clubs and specialist parts.

The 2000 and derivatives are also popular with modifiers owing to common parts and engines shared with other Triumph models such as the TR6, GT6, and Vitesse.

== Motor sport ==
Factory-entered 2.5 PIs finished 2nd and 4th in the 1970 London to Mexico World Cup Rally.
