= 1970 London to Mexico World Cup Rally =

Intercontinental motor rally competition

1970 London to Mexico World Cup Rally Daily Mirror World Cup Rally
- Host country: United Kingdom; Mexico
- Rally base: London; Mexico City
- Dates run: 19 April – 27 May 1970
- Stages: 32
- Stage surface: Tarmac and Gravel
- Overall distance: 25,700 km (16,000 miles)

Statistics
- Crews: 96 at start, 23 at finish

Overall results
- Overall winner: (Finland) Hannu Mikkola (Sweden) Gunnar Palm (United Kingdom) Daily Telegraph-Ford Motor Company Limited

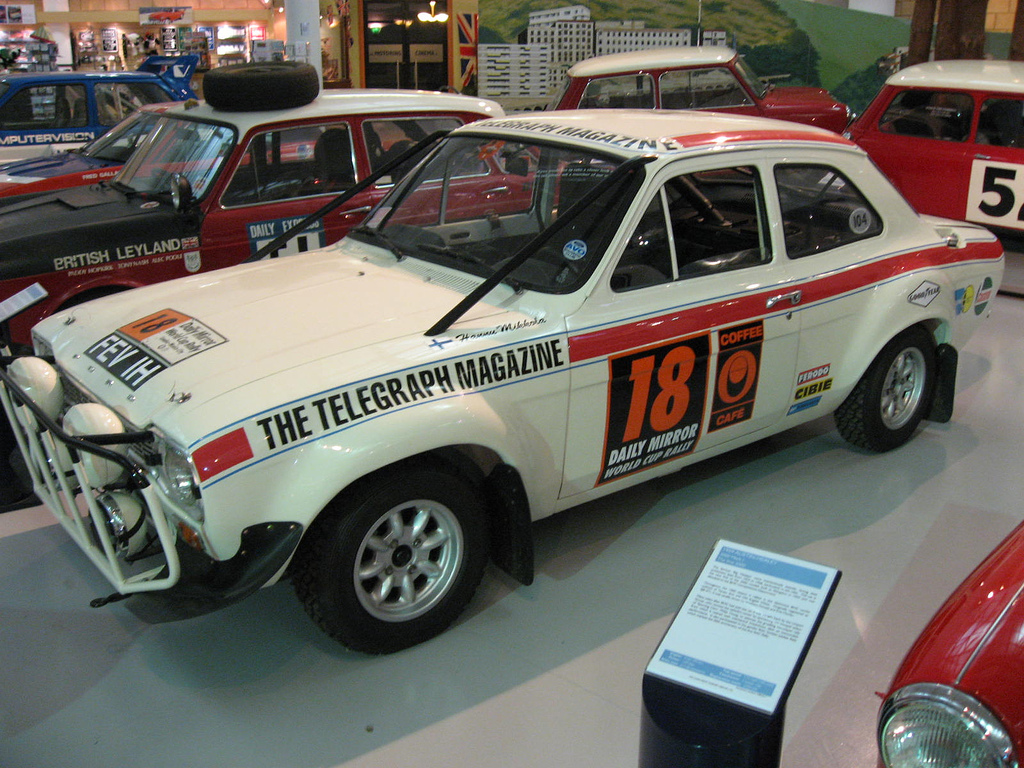
Mikkola's rally-winning Ford Escort.

The 1970 London-Mexico World Cup Rally was the first of two World Cup Rallies to be held and the second of four marathon rallies to be held in a nine-year period beginning with the 1968 London-Sydney Marathon. The motor rally started at Wembley Stadium in London on 19 April 1970 and finished in Mexico City on 27 May 1970, covering approximately 16,000 miles (25,700 km) through Europe and South America. It was won by Hannu Mikkola and Gunnar Palm, driving a Ford Escort.

== Organisation ==
The event was the brainchild of Wylton Dickson, possibly inspired by the earlier 1968 London-Sydney Marathon, and was to mark the fact that the 1966 FIFA World Cup had been held in London and that the upcoming 1970 FIFA World Cup was to be held in Mexico. Dickson approached the renowned British rally driver Paddy Hopkirk and together they went to The Daily Mirror for sponsorship.

The event was organised by members of the RAC and the MSA.

== Route and scoring ==
The course covered approximately 16,000 miles (25,700 km) through Europe, South America and Central America. Two boats were needed to convey the rally, one to cross the Atlantic Ocean from Lisbon to Rio de Janeiro and a second from Buenaventura, Colombia across the Gulf of Panama to Panama to avoid the impassable Darién Gap. Some of the principal towns and cities visited were, in order:

European leg (April 19-25)

- London, England
- Dover, England
- Boulogne-sur-Mer, France
- Mannheim, Germany
- Munich, Germany
- Vienna, Austria
- Budapest, Hungary
- Belgrade, Yugoslavia
- Sofia, Bulgaria
- Trieste, Italy
- Venice, Italy
- Genoa, Italy
- Toulouse, France
- Pau, France
- Burgos, Spain
- Salamanca, Spain
- Lisbon, Portugal

Americas leg (May 9-27)

- Rio de Janeiro, Brazil
- Montevideo, Uruguay
- Buenos Aires, Argentina
- Bariloche, Argentina
- Santiago, Chile, Chile
- La Paz, Bolivia
- Lima, Peru
- Cali, Colombia
- Panama City, Panama
- San José, Costa Rica
- Mexico City, Mexico

The course included many special stages, some over 500 miles (800 km) long. Time penalties were given for exceeding set times on the special stages, as well as for other infractions of the rules, and the cars' positions determined by the penalties awarded rather than lowest cumulative times.

== Cars ==
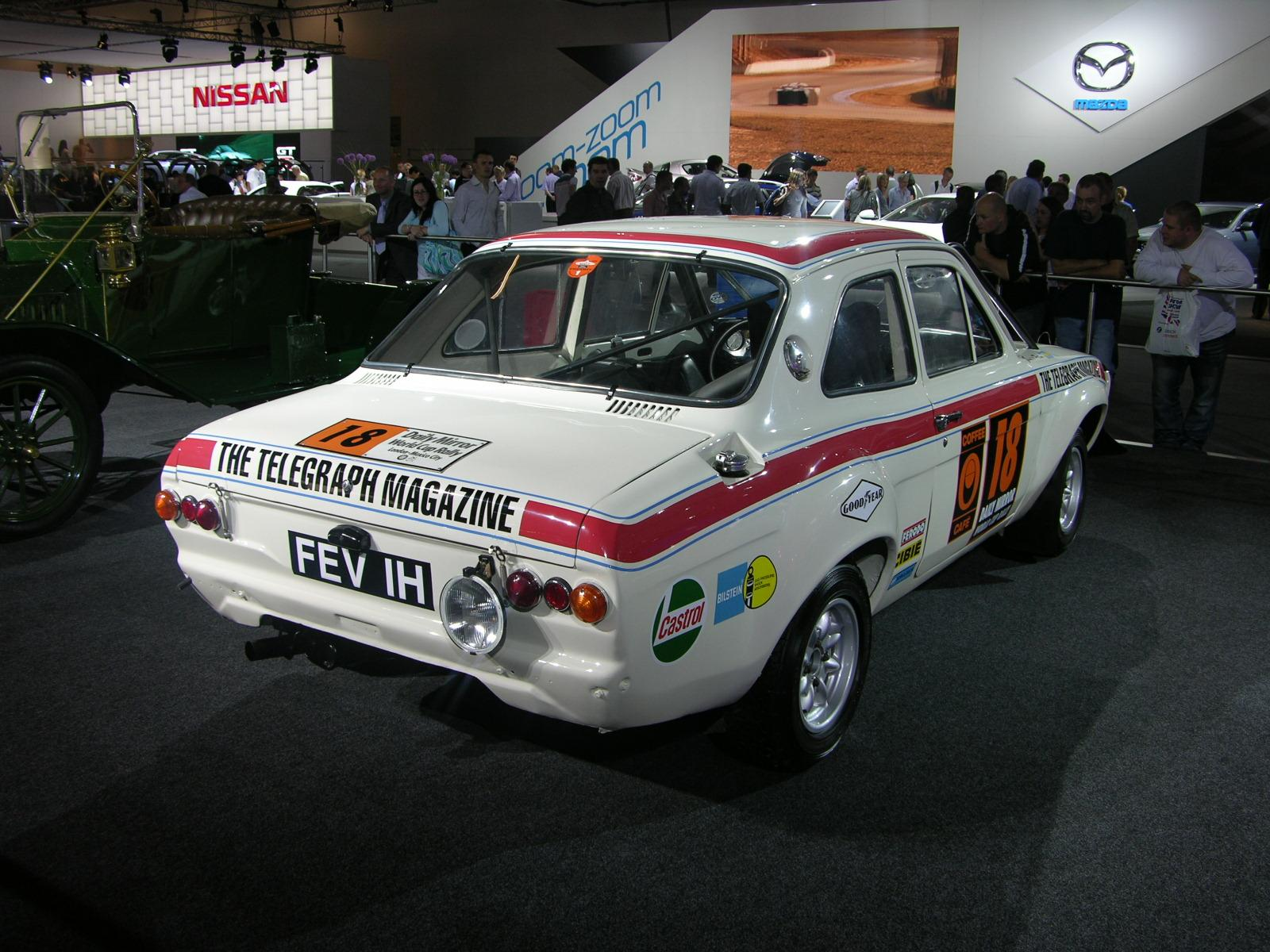
Mikkola's Ford Escort prototype based on the RS1600, from the rear.

Over one hundred cars started the event. The rules about what cars could be entered were not restrictive but due to the demanding nature of the course most competitors were conservative and used modified versions of standard models. That did not prevent there being a wide variety of cars, from Volkswagen Beetles to Rolls-Royces. There were works (officially sanctioned and prepared) entries from Ford, British Leyland and Moskvitch, and semi-works entries from Citroën.

The Ford team ran modified Escort Mk Is, fitted with an 1850 cc version of the crossflow Kent engine and uprated with various other parts from other Ford models. Each Ford car had two drivers. The British Leyland team entered two teams. The first team ran three Triumph 2.5PI Mark 2s, which were more powerful than the Fords but were significantly heavier; two cars carried a three-man crew, Brian Culcheth preferring to stick with a conventional two-man crew. The second Leyland team ran Austin Maxis, Austin 1800s (some badged Morris) and a lone Mini Clubman. Citroën used the venerable DS21. Moskvich used the Moskvich 412 with 1500 cc engine.

Other cars run in the event included:

- BMW 2002ti
- Datsun 1600SSS
- Ford Cortina Lotus
- Ford Escort Mk I
- Hillman Hunter
- Jeep Wagoneer
- Mercedes-Benz 280SE
- Peugeot 404
- Porsche 911
- Rolls-Royce Silver Cloud
- Rolls-Royce Silver Shadow
- Trident Venturer
- VW-based beach buggy

== Competitors ==
Many rally drivers of the day entered the event, including:

- Rauno Aaltonen
- Roger Clark
- Jorge Burgoa (Bolivian National Team)
- Andrew Cowan (winner of the 1968 London-Sydney marathon)
- Brian Culcheth
- Tony Fall
- Paddy Hopkirk
- Timo Mäkinen
- Hannu Mikkola
- Jack Murray
- Gilbert Staepelaere
- Rosemary Smith
- Rene Trautmann
- Guy Verrier
- Gastón Perkins
- Jose Migliore
- Alcides Rodriguez (Peugeot #33)
- Henri "Ido" Marang, french driver on Citroën #47 who was killed on May 24, in a traffic accident in Panama, two days before the race's end. His co-driver, Paul Coltelloni survived but was seriously injured.

As well as professional rally drivers, the event attracted a number of well known people, including the footballer Jimmy Greaves, who finished a very creditable sixth, and HRH Prince Michael of Kent, who failed to finish.

== Results ==
Pos	No	Entrant	Drivers	Car	Penalties (Time)
1	18	(United Kingdom) Daily Telegraph-Ford Motor Company Limited	(Finland) Hannu Mikkola (Sweden) Gunnar Palm	Ford Escort 1850 GT Mark I	9hr 7min
2	88	(United Kingdom) British Leyland Cars-The Football Association	(United Kingdom) Brian Culcheth (United Kingdom) Johnstone Syer	Triumph 2.5 PI Mark II	10hr 25min
3	46	(United Kingdom) Daily Express-Ford Motor Company Limited	(Finland) Rauno Aaltonen (United Kingdom) Henry Liddon	Ford Escort 1850 GT Mark I	10hr 46min
4	98	(United Kingdom) British Leyland Cars-The Football Association	(United Kingdom) Paddy Hopkirk (United Kingdom) Tony Nash (United Kingdom) Neville Johnson	Triumph 2.5 PI Mark II	12hr 26min
5	103	(United Kingdom) Daily Telegraph-Ford Motor Company Limited	(Finland) Timo Mäkinen (Belgium) Gilbert Staepelaere	Ford Escort 1850 GT Mark I	14hr 31min
6	26	(United Kingdom) Springfield Boys Club-Ford Motor Company Limited	(United Kingdom) Jimmy Greaves (United Kingdom) Tony Fall	Ford Escort 1850 GT Mark I	19hr 31min
7	100	Societe d’Encouragement de Automobile France	(France) Patrick Vanson (France) Olivier Turcat (France) Alain Leprince	Citroën DS 21	22hr 3min
8	14	(United Kingdom) Ford Motor Company Limited	(Poland) Sobiesław Zasada (Poland) Marek Wachowski	Ford Escort 1850 GT Mark I	23hr 59min
9	54	(United Kingdom) Reginald Redgrave	(United Kingdom) Reginald 'Redge' Redgrave (United Kingdom) Phil Cooper (United Kingdom) Bob Freeborough	BMC 1800	24hr 42min
10	74	(United Kingdom) Evening Standard-British Leyland Cars	(Republic of Ireland) Rosemary Smith (United Kingdom) Alice Watson (France) Ginette Derolland	Austin Maxi	30hr 35min
11	32	BLMC Australia	(Australia) Ken Tubman (Australia) Andre Welinski (Australia) Robert McAuley	Austin Maxi	32hr 36min
12	28	(Soviet Union) Avtoexport	(Soviet Union) Leonti Potapchik (Soviet Union) Edouard Bazhenov (Soviet Union) Youri Lesovski	Moskvitch 412	34hr 6min
13	29	(Bolivia) Bolivian National Team	(Bolivia) William Bendek (Bolivia) Dieter Hubner (Bolivia) Jorge Burgoa	BMW 2002 Ti	35hr 14min
14	15	(United Kingdom) Temple Meads Motors	(United Kingdom) Ron Channon (United Kingdom) Rod Cooper	Ford Cortina GT Mark II	36hr 43min
15	83	(United Kingdom) W.G. James	(United Kingdom) Alun Rees (United Kingdom) Hywel Thomas (United Kingdom) Washington James	Hillman Hunter	37hr 50min
16	38	(Germany) Fixo-Flex Sports Team	(Germany) Alfred Katz (Germany) Alfred Kling (Germany) Albert Pfuhl	Mercedes-Benz 280 SE	38hr 5min
17	71	(Soviet Union) Avtoexport	(Soviet Union) Gunnar Holm (Soviet Union) Vladimir Bubnov (Soviet Union) Kestutis Girdauskas	Moskvitch 412	38hr 52min
18	91	(United Kingdom) Woman Magazine	(United Kingdom) Jean Denton (United Kingdom) Pat Wright (United Kingdom) Liz Crellin	BMC 1800	39hr 16min
19	66	SAFRAR-Peugeot Argentina	(Argentina) Gaston Perkins (Argentina) Jack Forrest Greene	Peugeot 404	40hr 46min
20	19	(Soviet Union) Avtoexport	(Soviet Union) Sergei Tenishev (Soviet Union) Valentin Kislykh (Soviet Union) Valeri Shirotchenkov	Moskvitch 412	41hr 5min
21	31	(Netherlands) Rob Janssen	(Netherlands) Rob Janssen (Netherlands) Jaap Dik	Datsun 1600 SSS	46hr 1min
22	96	(United Kingdom) Autocar-British Leyland Cars	(United Kingdom) Terry Kingsley (United Kingdom) Peter Evans (United Kingdom) Michael Scarlett	Austin Maxi	46hr 25min
23	45	(United Kingdom) Doug Harris	(United Kingdom) Doug Harris (United Kingdom) Mike Butler	Ford Escort 1300 GT Mark I	66hr 8min
