= HB (cigarette) =

German cigarette brand

- Product type: Cigarette
- Current owner: British American Tobacco
- Produced by: British American Tobacco
- Country: Germany
- Introduced: 1955; 71 years ago

Haus Bergmann is a German brand of cigarettes, currently owned and manufactured by British American Tobacco. The name HB is derived from the name of the Dresdner cigarette factory Haus Bergmann, which was acquired by BAT in 1932.

== History ==
HB cigarettes were first brought to the market in 1955 in West Germany. The brand was first advertised with the slogan "Eine Filterzigarette, die schmeckt" ("A filter cigarette that tastes good"). This was an innovation to the German market in which most filter cigarettes could only achieve a market share of 7.2% at the time of introduction of HB cigarettes; the introduction of HB has significantly accelerated progress towards the filter cigarette. HB brand cigarettes quickly spread in the German market thanks to their simple design, on which the brand still builds on as a modern, dynamic cigarette and has in turn become attractive to young people.

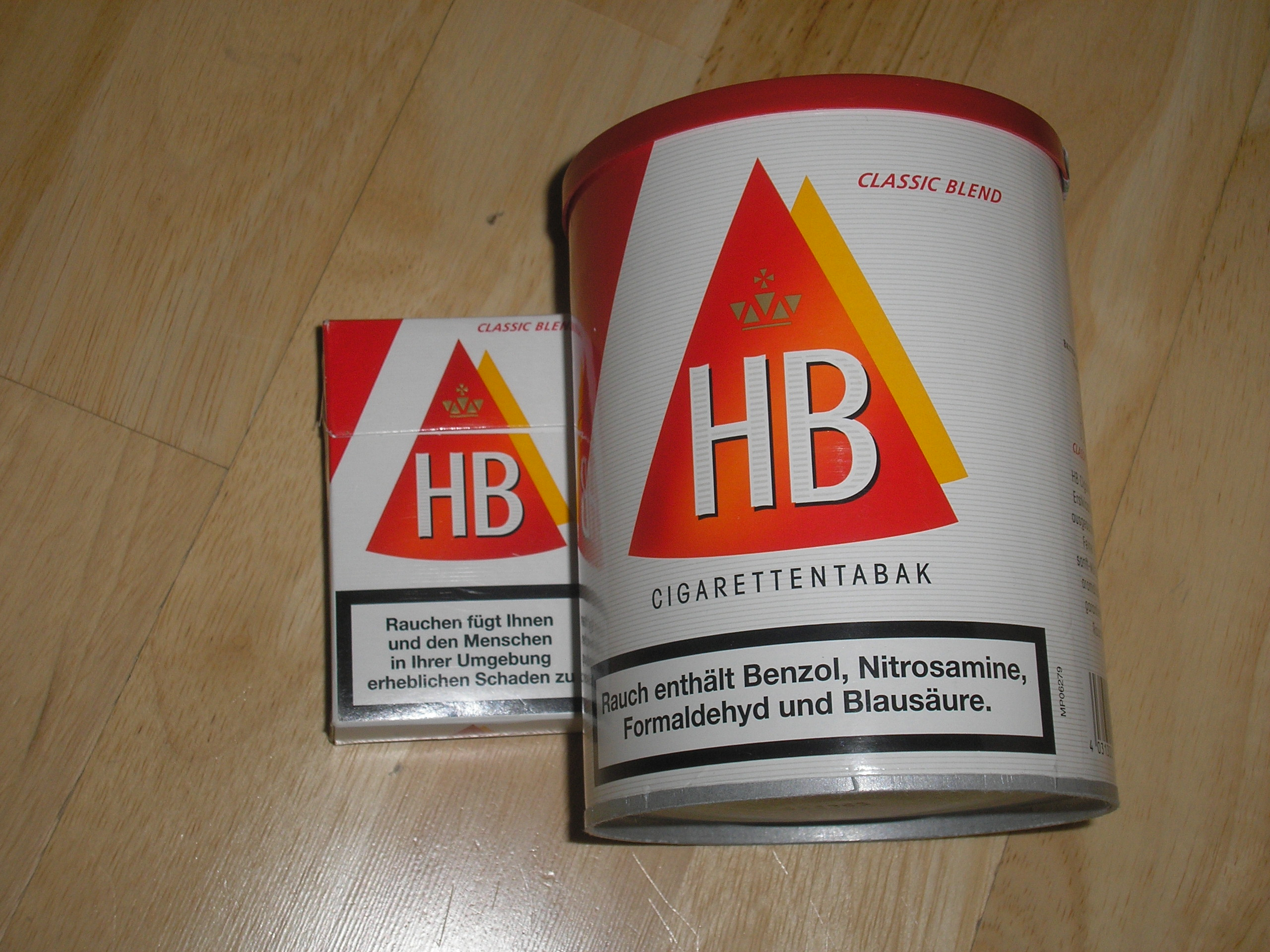
German pack of HB cigarettes on the left and tin of HB tobacco on the right

British American Tobacco was less concerned with young and dynamic people than with simple profits when they bypassed the international trade embargo against Rhodesia in the 1970s and marketed HB there. It was an investment that could pay off. By the mid-1990s – Rhodesia had long since become independent and was now Zimbabwe – Marlboro had been unable to place itself on the local market of the country, which was still dominated by HB.

In 2016, BAT reported it had plans to close their factory in Bayreuth and move production to East Europe, most notably Poland, Romania, Hungary or Croatia. This would be the first time a German cigarette brand who was always produced in Germany, would move production outside of Germany. At its peak, the German factory produced 53 billion cigarettes a year, around one third for the German cigarette trade and the remainder for export, especially to other European countries. It is currently unclear if BAT actually moved the production or not, however.

== Advertisement ==
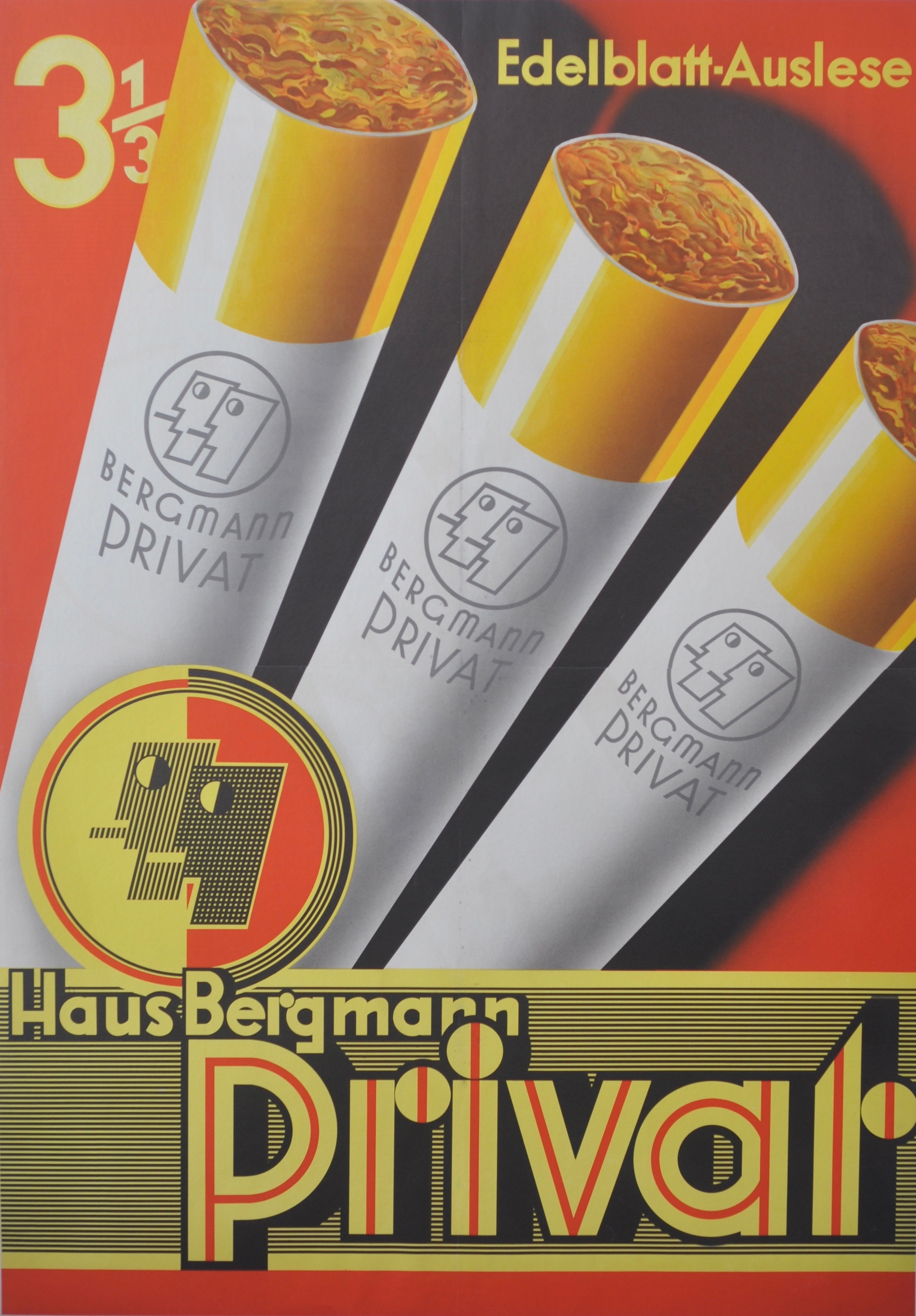
Haus Bergmann Ad (1935)

=== HB-Männchen" ===
The HB-Männchen ('HB Man') is a cartoon character with whom BAT advertised the HB cigarettes. Bruno, the unofficial name of the HB Man, is one of the best-known advertising figures in the history of German commercial television.

The commercials in cinema and television with Bruno always ran according to the same pattern: It represented everyday situations where something always went wrong, whereupon Bruno became terribly upset, raging with incomprehensible language (it was Arabic, played backwards with double or, accordingly the increasing excitement, was played at a higher speed) and literally "went up in the air". The following slogan – spoken from the off with a soothing voice – read: "Stop, my friend! Who's getting mad so fast? Better reach for a HB!" And Bruno hovered as the HB-König ('HB-King') relaxed back to the ground in a good mood, accompanied by the voice: "Then everything goes by itself". The cigarette was thus advertised as a problem solver and relaxant, a concept that still applies to many products today.

Commercials with Bruno were produced from 1957 to 1984, after the advertising ban on cigarettes on television (1974) but only shown in the cinema. In the 1960s, it brought the HB male on a profile of 96% of the audience. At that time HB was the best-known cigarette brand in Germany.

Creator of this figure, which was initially drawn in black and white, was the cartoon director Roland Töpfer.

Today, HB cigarettes are no longer advertised due to the bans on cigarette advertising in Germany.

=== Printing works ===
In 1977, the series of HB image atlases was established. The travel guide series in DIN A4 format, published as HB-Bildatlas, dealt with travel destinations in Germany and around the world. The series trades since January 2010 in a new design as the Dumont Picture Atlas.

From 1979, a nature magazine was published outside (price 1979: 6.50 Deutsche Mark), which in each volume thematized a landscape area from the European area. It was discontinued in 1987.

In 1983, the HB-Kunstführer were added, in which various regions and art landscapes of Germany and Europe were presented in words and pictures. The series existed until 1997.

All ranks appeared on the name of the cigarette brand based HB publishing house and distribution company in Hamburg.

=== Special edition cigarette packs ===
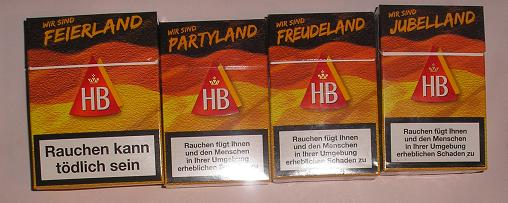
Action packs of HB Special Edition "We are...-land" in the summer of 2008

As is customary in the industry, the HB brand has from time to time published cigarette packs that deviate from the standard design, with special motifs intended to make customers curious and bound to the brand. For example, at the beginning of the 1990s HB had the "Undercover" special series, in which the cigarette packs were completely black, and in 2004 the "Growing Regions" special series, which presented tobacco growing areas to the consumer, as well as – matching the European Football Championship 2008 – the Wir sind Feierland (literally: 'We are Celebration Country') series, for which the cigarette packs were made in German national colors (black-red-gold) and with one of the slogans "Wir sind Feierland", "Wir sind Partyland", "Wir sind Jubelland" or "Wir sind Freudeland".

== Market share ==
=== Before ===
In their year of origin, 1955, HB cigarettes achieved a market share of only 0.4%. This value was increased to 5.6% in the following year, and to 12.9% in 1958. In 1959, with a market share of 17%, the brand first reached the top position among the cigarette brands marketed in Germany, which it was able to defend until 1984. In 1975, HB cigarettes were the best-selling in Europe. Since 1986, the Marlboro brand has become the most popular cigarette brand on the German market.

=== Today ===
Today, the HB cigarette family is still one of the most sold cigarette brands in Germany. However, their market share dropped from 4.7% to 3.5% between 2002 and 2007. This development is partly due to the fact that HB's parent company, BAT, focuses primarily on international premium brands, such as Lucky Strike, or low-price brands, such as Pall Mall, but not on typical German companies, such as the HB family. Nevertheless, the HB family, with its market share of 3.5%, is still represented in the top ten of the most sold cigarette brands in Germany.

As of 2016, the market share of HB has dropped below the 1%, and may be taken off the German market due to the new EU legislation of cigarette packaging, which enforces big picture warnings and limits the space for manufacturers to advertise their brand.

The brand is mainly sold in Germany, but also was or still is sold in Belgium, the Netherlands, France, Austria, Switzerland, Spain, Italy, Poland, Hungary, the Czech Republic, Russia, Vietnam and Tunisia (Duty-Free Shops only).

== Sport sponsorship ==
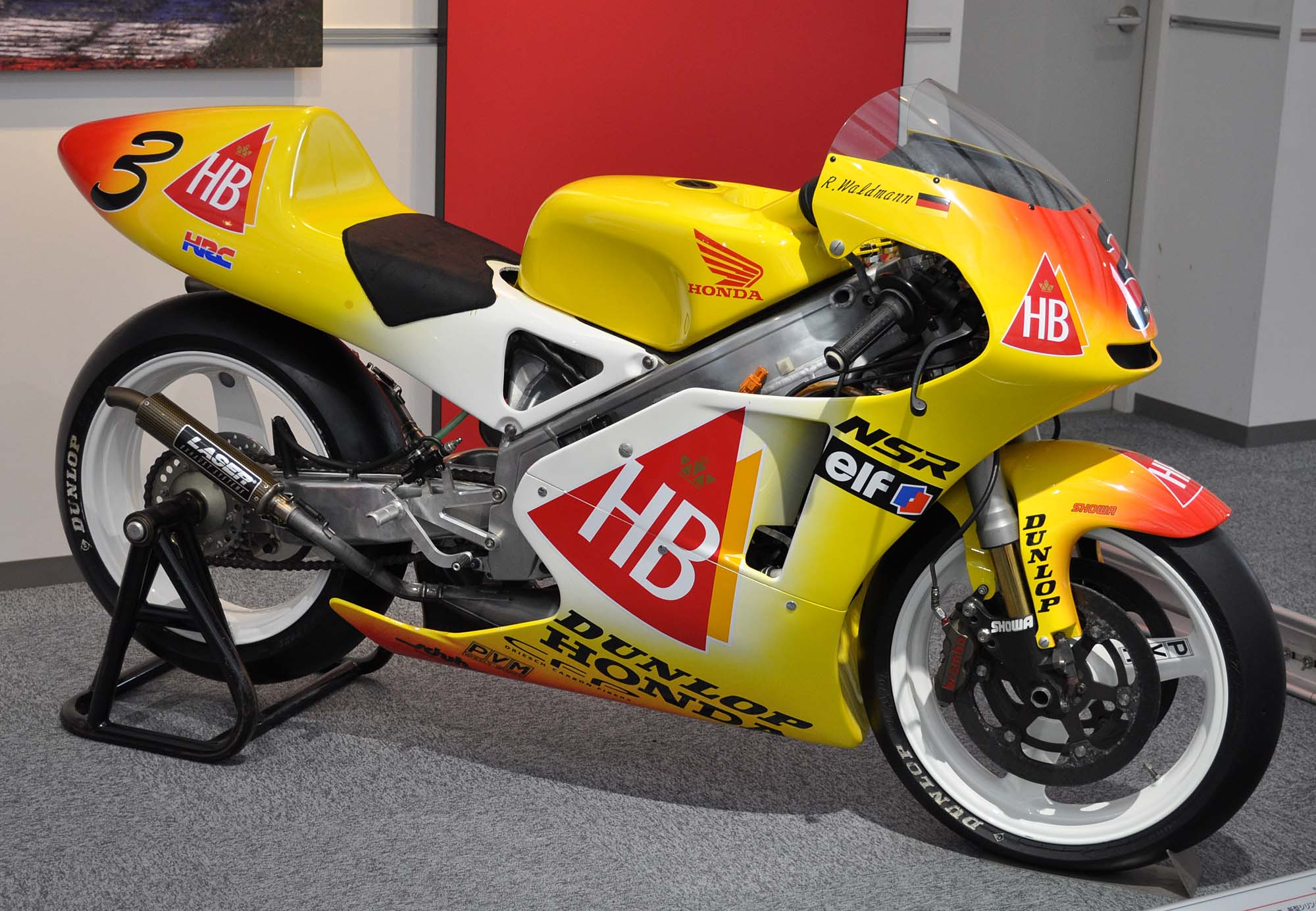
The Honda NSR250 of Ralf Waldmann, used in the 1996 season

HB sponsored the Audi Sport Rally team in the 1984 World Rally Championship. This continued until the 1987 World Rally Championship.

HB was also a sponsor on multiple race tracks in the old 500cc class on tracks like the Hungaroring in Hungary and on the Dutch TT in The Netherlands. They also sponsored various teams in the 500cc and 250cc championships, such as the Suzuki MotoGP team (known as "HB-Suzuki", driving the Suzuki RG 500 gamma) from 1982 to 1986, the Honda MotoGP team (known as "HB-Honda" in the 500cc, driving the Honda NSR500, and as "HB Römer-Honda" in the 250cc driving the Honda NSR250) from 1983 to 1996 and the Yamaha MotoGP team (known as "Team HB Venemotos", driving in the Yamaha YZR 250) in 1987.

== See also ==
- Tobacco smoking
