= Ford Escort =

Ford Escort may refer to one of several vehicles manufactured by Ford Motor Company:

- Ford Escort (Europe), a vehicle manufactured by Ford Europe from 1968 to 2002
  - Ford Escort RS Cosworth, sports and rally version of the fifth generation European Escort
    - Ford Escort WRC, a rally car based on the Ford Escort RS Cosworth
- Ford Escort (North America), a compact car manufactured for the North American market from 1980 to 2003
- Ford Escort (China), a Ford Focus-based compact car for the Chinese market from 2015 to 2023
- Ford Escort (Squire-based estate), a variant of the Ford Squire built and marketed in the United Kingdom from 1955 to 1961
