= Ido Marang =

French field hockey player

Personal information
- Nationality: French
- Born: 19 December 1918 La Haye, France
- Died: 24 May 1970 (aged 51) Penonome, Panama

Sport
- Sport: Field hockey

Ido Marang (19 December 1918 – 24 May 1970) was a French field hockey player. He competed in the men's tournament at the 1960 Summer Olympics.
