= Tony Fall =

British rally driver

Richard Anthony Fall (23 March 1940 – 1 December 2007) was a British rally driver. He was born in Bradford. He began his rallying career as a club rally driver in a Mini. He was considerably better than his peers, however, and was soon spotted by the BMC team; this led to a drive in their works team alongside Paddy Hopkirk, Timo Mäkinen and Rauno Aaltonen. His first major international victory in the Mini was the 1966 Circuit of Ireland, where his co-driver was Henry Liddon.

Fall worked as Salesman for Appleyards Bradford, a BMC dealership which sold Austin and Morris Mini Coopers. At that time, Appleyards supported the privateer rally drivers and employed ex BMC Competitions Manager Marcus Chambers in their Service Department. Fall gained permission from Appleyards to use one of their Cooper 'S' demonstrator cars AAK 500C to use as his rally car in the 1965 season. It was at this time that Fall was discovered by the BMC Competitions Department in Abingdon. The Competitions Manager at the time was Stuart Turner and he offered Fall a drive with the BMC Team. Fall accepted and became one of the most celebrated BMC Works drivers.

Fall drove a Leyland (Austin) 1800, with co-driver Denis Johnson, in the 1968 Canadian Shell 4000 Rally, which ran from Calgary to Halifax, finishing 7th overall. Fall also drove for British Leyland Cars in an Austin 1800 in the 1968 London to Sydney Rally.

In the 1970 London to Mexico World Cup Rally, he participated with a celebrity co-driver, the footballer Jimmy Greaves - they finished 6th overall. He also won the famous Peruvian Rally "Caminos del Inca", in 1969, driving a Ford Escort.

After he stopped driving, he became founder of the British Dealer Opel Team (DOT) as well as the self-willed but successful director of the Opel Motorsport Team in Germany, for which Walter Röhrl won the World Rally Championship for Drivers in 1982 with an Opel Ascona 400. Returning to England in the late 1980s, Fall formed the company Opel Classics, with Steve Thompson Cars (UK Irmscher Car Dealership) and Tom May (Director of Irmscher UK). The company became responsible for restoring and maintaining ex Opel competition cars and they also built a small number of fully re-commissioned classics Opels using the Opel GT model, cars being from California and also an Opel GT purchased by Fall from an Opel Dealership during the 1982 San Remo Rally. After this venture, Fall became first the manager and later the owner/director of the Safety Devices company. Fall's last major outing was the 2003 Historic Rally Championship with co-driver Jonathan Hall-Smith, where he competed with his Datsun 240Z.

Fall died after a heart attack on 1 December 2007 while a member of the organisation team of the East African Safari Classic Rally in his hotel room at Ngurdoto Mountain Lodge in Tanzania, leaving his wife Pat and two sons from a previous marriage.
