= Canada Cup (floorball) =

Annual floorball competition held in Canada

The Canada Cup
- Founded: 2004
- Number of teams: 57 (2010)
- Current champions: SWE Lindås Waves
- Most successful club: USA NYC Floorball (2) / CAN Salming Vikings (2)
- Television broadcasters: Rogers TV
- Website: thecanadacup.com

The Canada Cup Floorball Championship, more commonly referred to as The Canada Cup, is an international floorball club open competition held annually during the Victoria Day long weekend in Toronto, Ontario, Canada.

First held in 2004, the competition is a multi-division open, with 8 divisions for multiple age-groups and skill levels. The tournament was the second of its kind in North America (the Fresno Floorball Club held the first ever tournament in May 2000) and is the biggest floorball competition outside of Europe. It attracts over 55 floorball clubs from worldwide, every year.

The 2010 edition of the event was held at York University from May 21 to 23. The 2011 event will be held from May 20 to 22 at York University.

In 2015, the rights to organize the Canada Cup Floorball Championship were granted to Floorball Canada by Grassroots Floorball.

== History ==
=== 2004/2005 Canada Cup ===
In 2004, the Canada Cup was founded by Juha Mikkola. The tournament was a success, drawing 6 teams to the University of Toronto from Canada and the United States. It had only one division, and was won by NYC Floorball, who defeated Boston Puukädet for the first-ever Canada Cup crown.

The 2005 tournament saw the competition double in size to 12 teams. Once again, it was held at the same venue, and saw almost the same result, only this time Montréal United was the runner-up to NYC Floorball, which captured their second Canada Cup Championship. To date, they are the only team to capture two elite division titles.

=== 2006 Canada Cup ===
More firsts were seen in the 2006 championship, where "European floorball" was seen for the first time. The tournament had its first international teams (outside of North America) compete in the tournament, with Finnish clubs Hand of Doom and M-Team playing, as well as Swedish club Oppeby SK. To date, the Hand of Doom club is considered the strongest team ever to play at the Canada Cup, as they regularly play in the 2nd division of the Salibandyliiga.

As well, the tournament added both an intermediate and youth division to accommodate the record 24 teams that were taking part. In addition to that, the tournament became the first North American competition to have two venues running simultaneously, as matches took place at both Humber College and the Ultimate Sports Centre.

Another initiative seen at the tournament was its partnership with the Czech Open, which saw it cross-promote the two events and attract more teams. In the end, Hand of Doom, the Philadelphia Stormers, and the Jericho Jets emerged as champions in their respective divisions.

=== 2007 Canada Cup ===
2007 was another year of records, which saw its first Swiss team partake in the tournament (UHC Lenzburg), as well as the emergence of leveled youth divisions, with an Atom/Peewee division and a Bantam/Midget division. Another venue was added for this competition, which also saw matches at Central Etobicoke Collegiate.

The competition also saw its first televised match, which is also the first floorball match shown on Canadian television. The elite division final was watched by South Ontario residents, who could view the match on Rogers TV. To add to all of these achievements, the tournament also housed the first matches between the Canadian and the United States' national floorball teams. The two-game series was won by the Canadians, who handily outscored their opponents by an aggregate score of 22:2.

In the end, the first Canadian team to capture the elite division at the Canada Cup came in the form of Montréal United, who defeated Innebandy Chicago 8:4.

=== 2008/2009 Canada Cup ===
A record 39 clubs registered for the 5th edition of the event, which most notably saw the addition of a ladies division and one central venue with several courts, at York University. Another Montréal based team won the elite division, with Red Phoenix capturing the crown this time.

An attempt was made to implement a midget youth division for the 2008 tournament, but the idea was scrapped due to a lack of interest.

More was seen at the 2009 event, with another record 49 teams registering to play. It marked the first time that the tournament would now be contested during its new dates, those being during the Victoria Day long weekend, rather than the Easter long weekend.

As well, a high school division was added, and four International Floorball Federation (IFF) referees officiated at the tournament, helping bring international standard officiating to the Canada Cup for the first time.

The tournament saw California's X-Stream IBK capture the elite crown, with a victory over the Czech Republic's TJ Sokol Jaroměř.

In addition to this, the tournament saw another first, with Source for Sports being the competition's first headline sponsor.

=== 2010 Canada Cup ===
The 2010 edition of the event was held at York University from May 21 to 23.

This 7th edition featured a record 57 teams. In the end, the Salming Vikings captured the elite division title, and the first youth clubs from abroad captured respective division championships as well, as Sweden's Skogsäng Cobras captured the high school title and Salem Panthers IF won the bantam division.

The tournament also saw the first clubs win multiple divisions. The Mississauga Red Devils captured both the recreational and atom/peewee crowns, and came close to capturing the bantam division with an impressive second-place finish. Although they participated under different names, the two Swedish teams belonged to the same club, capturing both the high school and bantam titles.

Source for Sports also returned as the tournament's headline sponsor, and 4 Finnish referees from the Salibandyliiga and the IFF were also hand to officiate matches.

=== 2011 Canada Cup ===
Although the 2011 tournament has not yet been announced, it is believed to be taking place at York University once again, during the Victoria Day long weekend from May 20 to 22.

The tournament will see the atom/peewee division split into two, becoming simply the atom and peewee divisions, and raising the total number of divisions to eight.

== Format ==
The Canada Cup follows certain rules and policies to ensure fair gameplay during the tournament. All matches are played on regulation size floorball courts, measuring at least 36 metres in length and 18 in width.

=== Gameplay ===
All matches, other than the elite division final, are played as two 15-minute periods with a 3-minute intermission in between and no timeouts. The elite division final, due to televised specifications, is played as three 20-minute periods with 10-minute intermissions and one 30-second timeout.

All other rules and sanctions are determined using IFF rules and a tournament jury.

=== Divisions ===
In order to provide level gameplay for all, teams play in divisions that promote certain levels of skill.

==== Elite ====
The elite division, which has been contested from the tournament's inception, sees the best teams from around the world play at a high level of floorball. NYC Floorball is the most successful team in the elite division, being the only team to ever capture two titles.

==== Intermediate ====
Contested since 2006, the intermediate division provides teams with a very competitive environment for matches without as much intensity as the elite division.

==== Ladies & Recreational ====
Both introduced in 2008, the ladies and recreational divisions give the opportunity for women to play at a competitive level and to allow teams to participate in a much less intense playing environment.

Manitoba has won 2 of the 3 ladies divisions contested so far, and the same story is seen in the recreational division, where Cambridge FC has also done just the same.

==== Youth ====
The Canada Cup has also allowed the opportunity for youth teams to participate across 4 divisions: High School, Bantam, and Atom, and Peewee.

A youth division was introduced in 2006, and in 2007, was split into two age groups that would correspond to the categories of Bantam/Midget and Atom/Peewee.

2008 saw the institution of the Bantam division, but an attempt made at creating a Midget division was scrapped due to a lack of interest. 2009 saw the first High School division take place, and 2011 will see the Atom/Peewee division split in two, to become the Atom and Peewee divisions.

== Champions ==
Year	Elite	Intermediate	Ladies	Recreational	High School	Midget	Bantam^{1,2}	Atom^{3}	Peewee
2013	(Sweden) Lindås Waves	(Switzerland) Swiss Floorball Academy	(Canada) Darkside FC	(Canada) Belleville FC	(Canada) Westmount Wildcats	(Canada) Ottawa Blizzard 2	(Canada) Parkland Warriors	(Canada) Whitby Roadrunners	(Canada) Hamilton Floorhawks
2012	(Canada) Salming Vikings	(Canada) Young Guns IBK	(United States) Team USA	(Canada) Cambridge FC	(Canada) SWC Bulldogs (Sr.)		(Canada) Parkland Warriors	(Canada) North York Bolts	(Canada) Ottawa Blizzard (Blue)
2011	(Canada) Hamilton Floorhawks	(Canada) Striation Six	Not contested	(Canada) Red Devils	(Canada) Sherwood FC		(Canada) Hamilton Floorhawks	(Canada) Hamilton Floorhawks	(Canada) Red Devils
2010	(Canada) Salming Vikings	(Canada) Young Guns IBK	(Canada) Darkside FC	(Canada) Red Devils	(Sweden) Skogsäng Cobras		(Sweden) Salem Panthers IF	(Canada) Red Devils	
2009	(United States) X-Stream IBK	(Canada) Striation Six	(Canada) Manitoba	(Canada) Cambridge FC	(Canada) Dufferin Royals		(Canada) Sherwood 9'ers	(Canada) North York Bolts	
2008	(Canada) Red Phoenix	(Canada) Ottawa Wolf Pack	(Canada) Manitoba	(Canada) Cambridge FC			(Canada) Pickering Warriors	(Canada) Denlow FC	
2007	(Canada) Montréal United	(Canada) Sherwood Danglers					(Canada) Pickering Warriors	(Canada) Denlow FC	
2006	(Finland) Hand of Doom	(United States) Philadelphia Stormers					(Canada) Jericho Jets		
2005	(United States) NYC Floorball								
2004	(United States) NYC Floorball								

^{1} For the 2006 tournament, the division was known as the Youth division
^{2} For the 2007 tournament, the division was known as the Bantam/Midget division
^{3} For the 2007-2010 tournaments, the division was known as the Atom/Peewee division

== See also ==
- Czech Open (floorball)
