= 1982 World Rally Championship =

10th season of the FIA World Rally Championship

Champions
- World Drivers' Champion: Walter Röhrl
- World Manufacturers' Champion: Audi

Seasons
- ← 1981 1983 →

The 1982 World Rally Championship was the tenth season of the Fédération Internationale de l'Automobile (FIA) World Rally Championship (WRC). The season consisted of 12 rallies. By this time, the schedule format had become generally stable with only one or two changes to venues year to year. 1982 marked the return of New Zealand to the schedule in place of Argentina's Rally Codasur.

1982 was marked by the dominance of the Germans, with two German manufacturers Opel and Audi taking first and second in the manufacturer's title race. Opel's driver, German Walter Röhrl, seized the driver's title. Audi pilots Michèle Mouton and Hannu Mikkola took second and third in the drivers' race, but their combined efforts were enough to put Audi over the top for the work's cup. Mouton's finish is the best by a female driver to this day.

As with previous seasons, while all 12 events were calculated for tallying the drivers' scores, only 10 of the events applied to the championship for manufacturers. The two events in 1982 which applied only to driver standings were Sweden and the Rallye Côte d'Ivoire. Röhrl's strong performance in both of these rallies would have improved Opel's bid for a world title had they counted for manufacturers as well as drivers.

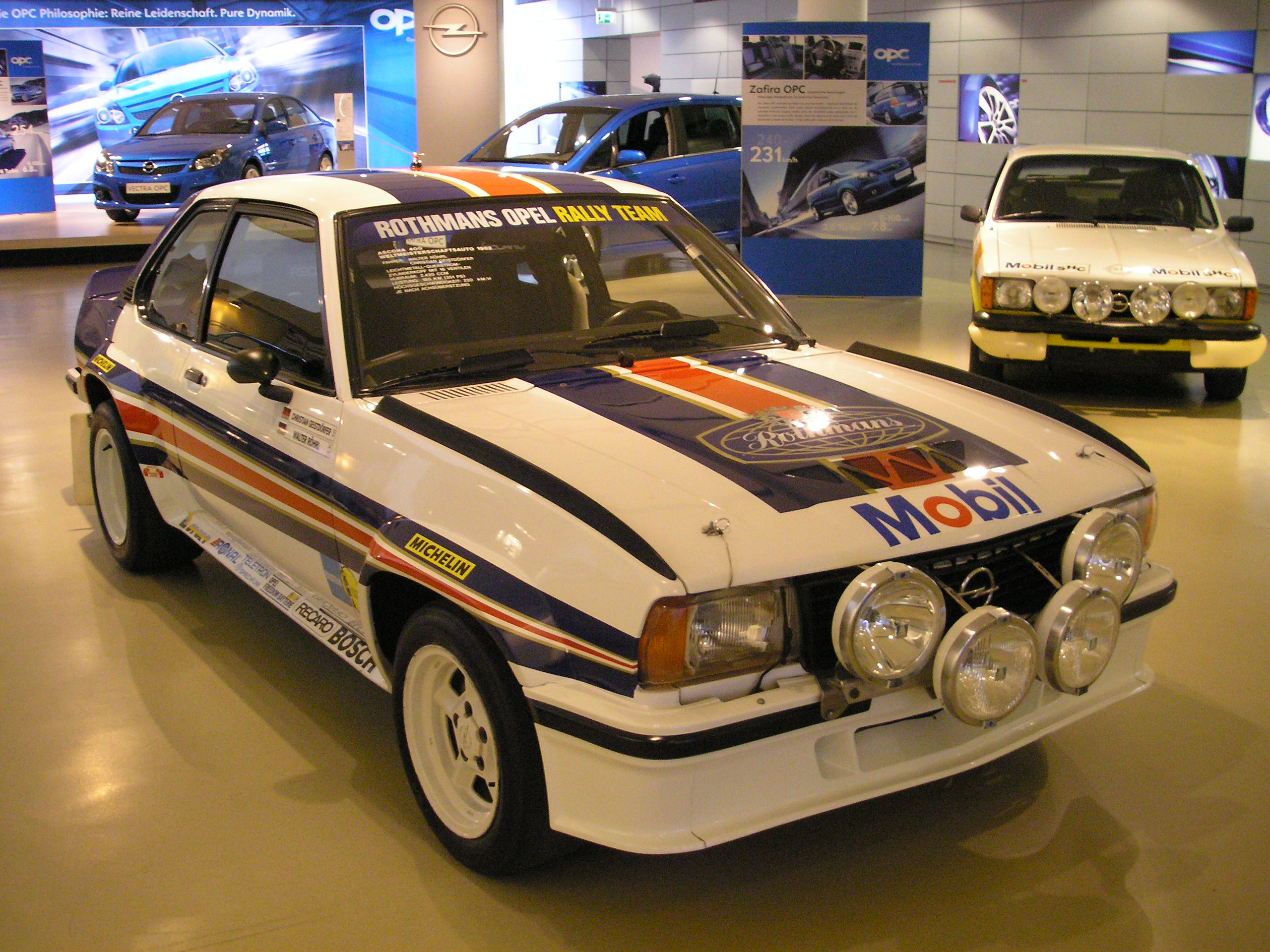
Walter Röhrl claimed his second WRC drivers' title driving an Opel Ascona 400.

== Calendar ==
Rd.	Start date	Finish date	Rally	Rally headquarters	Surface	Stages	Distance	Points
1	16 January	22 January	(Monaco) 50th Rallye Automobile Monte-Carlo	Monte Carlo	Mixed	32	747.81 km	Drivers & Manufacturers
2	12 February	14 February	(Sweden) 32nd International Swedish Rally	Karlstad, Värmland County	Snow	25	366.51 km	Drivers only
3	3 March	6 March	16th Rallye de Portugal - Vinho do Porto	Estoril, Lisbon	Mixed	40	637.07 km	Drivers & Manufacturers
4	8 April	12 April	(Kenya) 30th Marlboro Safari Rally	Nairobi	Gravel	N/A	5016 km	Drivers & Manufacturers
5	6 May	8 May	26th Tour de Corse - Rallye de France	Ajaccio, Corsica	Tarmac	27	1176.10 km	Drivers & Manufacturers
6	31 May	3 June	(Greece) 29th Rothmans Acropolis Rally	Athens	Gravel	57	1004.58 km	Drivers & Manufacturers
7	26 June	29 June	13th Motogard Rally of New Zealand	Auckland	Gravel	38	1014.26 km	Drivers & Manufacturers
C	July	July	(Argentina) Rally Codasur	Tucumán	Gravel	??	??	Drivers & Manufacturers
8	11 August	14 August	(Brazil) 4th Marlboro Rallye do Brasil	São Paulo	Gravel	29	705.98 km	Drivers & Manufacturers
9	27 August	29 August	(Finland) 32nd Rally of the 1000 Lakes	Jyväskylä, Central Finland	Gravel	47	479.82 km	Drivers & Manufacturers
10	3 October	9 October	(Italy) 24th Rallye Sanremo	Sanremo, Liguria	Mixed	56	735.44 km	Drivers & Manufacturers
11	27 October	1 November	(Ivory Coast) 14th Marlboro Rallye Cote d'Ivoire	Abidjan	Gravel	N/A	5001 km	Drivers only
12	21 November	25 November	(United Kingdom) 38th Lombard RAC Rally	York	Gravel	69	711.73 km	Drivers & Manufacturers

Rally Codasur was cancelled due to an economic crisis in Argentina and the outbreak of the Falklands war. Rally Brazil became part of the Manufacturers championship to compensate.

== Teams and drivers ==
Team	Constructor	Car	Tyre	Drivers	Rounds
(Germany) Audi Sport	Audi	Quattro	K	(Finland) Hannu Mikkola	1–3, 5–12
(Germany) Audi Sport	Audi	Quattro	K	(France) Michèle Mouton	1–3, 5–12
(Germany) Audi Sport	Audi	Quattro	K	(Italy) Michele Cinotto	1, 6, 10
(Germany) Audi Sport	Audi	Quattro	K	(Sweden) Stig Blomqvist	2, 9–10
(Germany) Audi Sport	Audi	Quattro	K	(Austria) Franz Wittmann	3, 5, 10
(Germany) Audi Sport	Audi	Quattro	K	(Germany) Harald Demuth	10, 12
(Germany) Audi Sport	Audi	Quattro	K	(United Kingdom) Malcolm Wilson	12
(Germany) Audi Sport	Audi	Quattro	K	(United States) John Buffum	12
(Germany) Rothmans Opel Rally Team	Opel	Ascona 400	M	(Germany) Walter Röhrl	1–8, 10–11
(Germany) Rothmans Opel Rally Team	Opel	Ascona 400	M	(Germany) Jochi Kleint	1, 5, 12
(Germany) Rothmans Opel Rally Team	Opel	Ascona 400	M	(Sweden) Björn Johansson	2, 9, 11–12
(Germany) Rothmans Opel Rally Team	Opel	Ascona 400	M	(Finland) Henri Toivonen	3, 6, 9–10, 12
(Germany) Rothmans Opel Rally Team	Opel	Ascona 400	M	(Finland) Rauno Aaltonen	4
(Germany) Rothmans Opel Rally Team	Opel	Ascona 400	M	(United Kingdom) Jimmy McRae	6, 12
(Germany) Rothmans Opel Rally Team	Opel	Ascona 400	M	(Finland) Ari Vatanen	12
(Germany) Rothmans Opel Rally Team	Opel	Ascona 400	M	(United Kingdom) Bill Dobie	12
(France) Charles Pozzi	Ferrari	308 GTB	M	(France) Jean-Claude Andruet	1, 5
(France) Charles Pozzi	Ferrari	308 GTB	M	(France) Guy Chasseuil	5
(France) Porsche Alméras	Porsche	911 SC	M	(France) Guy Fréquelin	1, 5
(France) Porsche Alméras	Porsche	911 SC	M	(Sweden) Björn Waldegård	1
(France) Porsche Alméras	Porsche	911 SC	M	(France) Jean-Luc Thérier	1, 3
(France) Porsche Alméras	Porsche	911 SC	M	(Italy) Sandro Munari	4
(France) Porsche Alméras	Porsche	911 SC	M	(France) Bernard Béguin	5
(France) Porsche Alméras	Porsche	911 SC	M	(France) Francis Vincent	5
(France) Porsche Alméras	Porsche	911 SC	M	(France) Jacques Alméras	5
(France) Porsche Alméras	Porsche	911 SC	M	(France) Pierre Orsini	5
(France) Porsche Alméras	Porsche	911 SC	M	(Sweden) Per Eklund	9
(France) Renault Sport	Renault	5 Turbo	M	(France) Bruno Saby	1, 5, 11
(France) Renault Sport	Renault	5 Turbo	M	(France) Dany Snobeck	1
(France) Renault Sport	Renault	5 Turbo	M	(France) Jean-Luc Thérier	5
(France) Renault Sport	Renault	5 Turbo	M	(France) Jean Ragnotti	5, 11
(France) Renault Sport	Renault	5 Turbo	M	(France) François Chatriot	5
(France) Renault Sport	Renault	5 Turbo	M	(France) Jean-Pierre Manzagol	5
(France) Citroën Compétitions	Citroën	Visa	M	(France) Alain Coppier	1, 3, 5–6, 9, 12
(France) Citroën Compétitions	Citroën	Visa	M	(France) Christian Dorche	1–3, 5–6, 10, 12
(France) Citroën Compétitions	Citroën	Visa	M	(France) Olivier Tabatoni	2–3, 6, 9–10, 12
(France) Citroën Compétitions	Citroën	Visa	M	(France) Christian Rio	5
(France) Citroën Compétitions	Citroën	Visa	M	(France) Maurice Chomat	5
(Japan) Team Ralliart	Mitsubishi	Lancer 2000 Turbo	Y	(Sweden) Lars Carlsson	1
(Japan) Team Ralliart	Mitsubishi	Lancer 2000 Turbo	Y	(Netherlands) André Jetten	1
(Japan) Team Ralliart	Mitsubishi	Lancer 2000 Turbo	Y	(Finland) Pentti Airikkala	9, 12
(Japan) Team Ralliart	Mitsubishi	Lancer 2000 Turbo	Y	(Sweden) Anders Kulläng	9–10, 12
Peugeot France	Peugeot	505 V6; 104 ZS	M	(France) Claude Laurent	1, 5
Peugeot France	Peugeot	505 V6; 104 ZS	M	(France) François Chauche	1, 5, 12
Peugeot France	Peugeot	505 V6; 104 ZS	M	(France) René Defour	1, 5, 12
Peugeot France	Peugeot	505 V6; 104 ZS	M	(France) Alain Ambrosino	11
(United Kingdom) David Sutton Motorsport	Ford	Escort RS 1800	P	(Finland) Ari Vatanen	2, 9
(United Kingdom) David Sutton Motorsport	Ford	Escort RS 1800	P	(Finland) Lasse Lampi	2, 9
(United Kingdom) David Sutton Motorsport	Ford	Escort RS 1800	P	(Finland) Harri Toivonen	9, 12
(Japan) Team Nissan Europe	Nissan	Violet GT/160 J Violet GTS	D	(Sweden) Sören Nilsson	2, 12
(Japan) Team Nissan Europe	Nissan	Violet GT/160 J Violet GTS	D	(Finland) Timo Salonen	3–4, 6–7, 9, 12
(Japan) Team Nissan Europe	Nissan	Violet GT/160 J Violet GTS	D	(United Kingdom) Tony Pond	3–4, 6–7
(Japan) Team Nissan Europe	Nissan	Violet GT/160 J Violet GTS	D	(Kenya) Shekhar Mehta	4, 6–8
(Japan) Team Nissan Europe	Nissan	Violet GT/160 J Violet GTS	D	(Kenya) Mike Kirkland	4
(Japan) Team Nissan Europe	Nissan	Violet GT/160 J Violet GTS	D	(Kenya) Jayant Shah	4
(Japan) Team Nissan Europe	Nissan	Violet GT/160 J Violet GTS	D	(Greece) George Moschous	6
(Japan) Team Nissan Europe	Nissan	Violet GT/160 J Violet GTS	D	(Finland) Erkki Pitkänen	9, 12
(Japan) Team Nissan Europe	Nissan	Violet GT/160 J Violet GTS	D	(Finland) Peter Geitel	9, 12
(Japan) Team Nissan Europe	Nissan	Violet GT/160 J Violet GTS	D	(United Kingdom) Andy Dawson	12
(Japan) Toyota Team Europe	Toyota	Celica 2000 GT (RA45); Celica 2000 GT (RA64)	P	(Sweden) Leif Asterhag	2, 12
(Japan) Toyota Team Europe	Toyota	Celica 2000 GT (RA45); Celica 2000 GT (RA64)	P	(Sweden) Björn Waldegård	3, 7, 11–12
(Japan) Toyota Team Europe	Toyota	Celica 2000 GT (RA45); Celica 2000 GT (RA64)	P	(Sweden) Per Eklund	3, 7, 11–12
(Japan) Toyota Team Europe	Toyota	Celica 2000 GT (RA45); Celica 2000 GT (RA64)	P	(Lebanon) Samir Assef	11
(Japan) Toyota Team Europe	Toyota	Celica 2000 GT (RA45); Celica 2000 GT (RA64)	P	(Sweden) Ove Andersson	11
(Italy) Martini Lancia	Lancia	Rally 037	P	(Italy) Attilio Bettega	5
(Italy) Martini Lancia	Lancia	Rally 037	P	(Finland) Markku Alén	5–6, 9–10, 12
(Italy) Martini Lancia	Lancia	Rally 037	P	(Italy) Adartico Vudafieri	6, 11
(Italy) Martini Lancia	Lancia	Rally 037	P	(Italy) Fabrizio Tabaton	10
BMW France	BMW	M1	P	(France) Bernard Darniche	5
(France) Peugeot Talbot Sport	Talbot	Sunbeam Lotus	P M	(Finland) Antero Laine	9
(France) Peugeot Talbot Sport	Talbot	Sunbeam Lotus	P M	(Italy) Federico Ormezzano	10
(France) Peugeot Talbot Sport	Talbot	Sunbeam Lotus	P M	(Sweden) Stig Blomqvist	12
(France) Peugeot Talbot Sport	Talbot	Sunbeam Lotus	P M	(France) Guy Fréquelin	12
(France) Peugeot Talbot Sport	Talbot	Sunbeam Lotus	P M	(United Kingdom) Chris Lord	12
(United Kingdom) Blydenstein Racing	Vauxhall	Chevette 2300 HSR	M	(United Kingdom) Russell Brookes	9, 12
(United Kingdom) Blydenstein Racing	Vauxhall	Chevette 2300 HSR	M	(United Kingdom) Tony Pond	12
(United Kingdom) Blydenstein Racing	Vauxhall	Chevette 2300 HSR	M	(United Kingdom) Terry Kaby	12
(United Kingdom) Blydenstein Racing	Vauxhall	Chevette 2300 HSR	M	(United Kingdom) George Hill	12
(United Kingdom) Blydenstein Racing	Vauxhall	Chevette 2300 HSR	M	(United Kingdom) Russell Gooding	12

== Championship for manufacturers ==
1982 World Rally Championship for Manufacturers
Rank	Manufacturers	Event										Total points
Rank	Manufacturers	(Monaco) MON	(Portugal) POR	(Kenya) KEN	(France) FRA	(Greece) GRC	(New Zealand) NZL	(Brazil) BRA	(Finland) FIN	(Italy) ITA	(United Kingdom) GBR	Total points
1	(West Germany) Audi	16	18	–	(6)	18	–	10	18	18	18	116
2	(West Germany) Opel	18	(12)	16	12	16	14	(9)	–	14	14	104
3	(Japan) Nissan	–	–	18	–	12	12	–	15	–	–	57
4	(United Kingdom) Ford	–	12	–	–	8	9	16	10	–	–	55
5	(Japan) Toyota	–	16	–	–	–	18	–	–	–	7	41
6	(France) Renault	10	–	–	18	4	–	–	–	2	–	34
7	(West Germany) Porsche	14	–	–	14	–	–	–	–	–	–	28
8	(Japan) Mitsubishi	–	–	8	–	–	–	–	14	6	–	28
9	(Italy) Lancia	–	–	–	10	–	–	–	–	–	15	25
10	(United Kingdom) Talbot	–	–	–	–	–	–	–	13	–	11	24
11	(France) Citroën	–	14	–	–	–	–	–	–	9	–	23
12	(United Kingdom) Vauxhall	–	–	–	–	–	–	–	10	–	9	19
13	(Italy) Ferrari	–	–	–	16	–	–	–	–	–	–	16
14	(Japan) Mazda	–	–	–	–	–	14	–	–	–	–	14
14	(West Germany) Volkswagen	–	–	–	–	–	–	14	–	–	–	14
16	(United Kingdom) British Leyland Cars	–	–	12	–	–	–	–	–	–	–	12
17	(Japan) Subaru	–	–	10	–	–	–	–	–	–	–	10
18	(Italy) Fiat	–	–	–	–	6	–	–	–	–	–	6

1982 World Rally Championship point awards for manufacturers
Overall finish	Group finish									
Overall finish	1	2	3	4	5	6	7	8	9	10
1	18	–	–	–	–	–	–	–	–	–
2	17	16	–	–	–	–	–	–	–	–
3	16	15	14	–	–	–	–	–	–	–
4	15	14	13	12	–	–	–	–	–	–
5	14	13	12	11	10	–	–	–	–	–
6	13	12	11	10	9	8	–	–	–	–
7	12	11	10	9	8	7	6	–	–	–
8	11	10	9	8	7	6	5	4	–	–
9	10	9	8	7	6	5	4	3	2	–
10	9	8	7	6	5	4	3	2	1	1

== Championship for drivers ==
1982 World Rally Championship for Drivers
Rank	Driver	Event												Total points
Rank	Driver	(Monaco) MON	(Sweden) SWE	(Portugal) POR	(Kenya) KEN	(France) FRA	(Greece) GRC	(New Zealand) NZL	(Brazil) BRA	(Finland) FIN	(Italy) ITA	(Ivory Coast) CIV	(United Kingdom) GBR	Total points
1	(West Germany) Walter Röhrl	20	12	–	15	(10)	15	12	15	–	(12)	20	–	109
2	(France) Michèle Mouton	–	8	20	–	4	20	–	20	–	10	–	15	97
3	(Finland) Hannu Mikkola	15	–	–	–	–	–	–	–	20	15	–	20	70
4	(Sweden) Stig Blomqvist	–	20	–	–	–	–	–	–	15	20	–	3	58
5	(Sweden) Per Eklund	–	10	15	–	–	–	15	–	–	–	15	2	57
6	(Sweden) Björn Waldegård	–	–	–	–	–	–	20	–	–	–	12	4	36
7	(Finland) Henri Toivonen	–	–	–	–	–	12	–	–	–	8	–	12	32
8	(Kenya) Shekhar Mehta	–	–	–	20	–	10	–	–	–	–	–	–	30
9	(France) Bruno Saby	8	–	–	–	8	–	–	–	–	–	10	–	26
10	(France) Jean Ragnotti	–	–	–	–	20	–	–	–	–	–	–	–	20
11	(Finland) Timo Salonen	–	–	–	–	–	–	10	–	10	–	–	–	20
12	(France) Guy Fréquelin	10	–	–	–	6	–	–	–	–	–	–	–	16
13	(Finland) Ari Vatanen	–	15	–	–	–	–	–	–	–	–	–	–	15
13	(France) Jean-Claude Andruet	–	–	–	–	15	–	–	–	–	–	–	–	15
15	(France) Jean-Luc Thérier	12	–	–	–	–	–	–	–	–	–	–	–	12
15	(Austria) Franz Wittmann	–	–	12	–	–	–	–	–	–	–	–	–	12
15	(Kenya) Mike Kirkland	–	–	–	12	–	–	–	–	–	–	–	–	12
15	(France) Bernard Béguin	–	–	–	–	12	–	–	–	–	–	–	–	12
15	(Uruguay) Domingo De Vitta	–	–	–	–	–	–	–	12	–	–	–	–	12
15	(Finland) Pentti Airikkala	–	–	–	–	–	–	–	–	12	–	–	–	12
21	(Finland) Markku Alén	–	–	–	–	2	–	–	–	–	–	–	10	12
22	(United Kingdom) Russell Brookes	–	–	–	–	–	–	–	–	6	–	–	6	12
23	(Portugal) Carlos Torres	–	–	10	–	–	–	–	–	–	–	–	–	10
23	(United Kingdom) Tony Pond	–	–	–	10	–	–	–	–	–	–	–	–	10
23	(Brazil) Aparecido Rodrigues	–	–	–	–	–	–	–	10	–	–	–	–	10
26	(France) Alain Coppier	–	–	8	–	–	–	–	–	–	–	–	–	8
26	(Kenya) Jayant Shah	–	–	–	8	–	–	–	–	–	–	–	–	8
26	(Greece) Iórgos Moschous	–	–	–	–	8	–	–	–	–	–	–	–	8
26	(New Zealand) Rod Millen	–	–	–	–	–	–	8	–	–	–	–	–	8
26	(Finland) Antero Laine	–	–	–	–	–	–	–	–	8	–	–	–	8
26	(France) Alain Ambrosino	–	–	–	–	–	–	–	–	–	–	8	–	8
26	(West Germany) Harald Demuth	–	–	–	–	–	–	–	–	–	–	–	8	8
33	(France) Dany Snobeck	6	–	–	–	–	–	–	–	–	–	–	–	6
33	(Finland) Lasse Lampi	–	6	–	–	–	–	–	–	–	–	–	–	6
33	(Portugal) Mário Silva	–	–	6	–	–	–	–	–	–	–	–	–	6
33	(Kenya) Rob Collinge	–	–	–	6	–	–	–	–	–	–	–	–	6
33	(United Kingdom) Jimmy McRae	–	–	–	–	–	6	–	–	–	–	–	–	6
33	(New Zealand) Tony Teesdale	–	–	–	–	–	–	6	–	–	–	–	–	6
33	(Italy) Michele Cinotto	–	–	–	–	–	–	–	–	–	6	–	–	6
33	(Ivory Coast) Eugène Salim	–	–	–	–	–	–	–	–	–	–	6	–	6
41	(West Germany) Jochi Kleint	4	–	–	–	–	–	–	–	–	–	–	–	4
41	(Sweden) Sören Nilsson	–	4	–	–	–	–	–	–	–	–	–	–	4
41	(Portugal) António Ferreira da Cunha	–	–	4	–	–	–	–	–	–	–	–	–	4
41	(Japan) Yoshinobu Takahashi	–	–	–	4	–	–	–	–	–	–	–	–	4
41	(Greece) Pavlos Moschoutis	–	–	–	–	–	4	–	–	–	–	–	–	4
41	(France) Jean-Louis Leyraud	–	–	–	–	–	–	4	–	–	–	–	–	4
41	(Finland) Harri Uotila	–	–	–	–	–	–	–	–	4	–	–	–	4
41	(Sweden) Anders Kulläng	–	–	–	–	–	–	–	–	–	4	–	–	4
49	(France) Philippe Touren	3	–	–	–	–	–	–	–	–	–	–	–	3
49	(Sweden) Kalle Grundel	–	3	–	–	–	–	–	–	–	–	–	–	3
49	(France) Christian Dorche	–	–	3	–	–	–	–	–	–	–	–	–	3
49	(Kenya) Frank Tundo	–	–	–	3	–	–	–	–	–	–	–	–	3
49	(France) Francis Vincent	–	–	–	–	3	–	–	–	–	–	–	–	3
49	(Greece) Leonidas	–	–	–	–	–	3	–	–	–	–	–	–	3
49	(New Zealand) Malcolm Stewart	–	–	–	–	–	–	3	–	–	–	–	–	3
49	(Finland) Jouni Kinnunen	–	–	–	–	–	–	–	–	3	–	–	–	3
49	(Italy) Miki Biasion	–	–	–	–	–	–	–	–	–	3	–	–	3
58	(France) Jean-Pierre Ballet	2	–	–	–	–	–	–	–	–	–	–	–	2
58	(Sweden) Bengt Thorsell	–	2	–	–	–	–	–	–	–	–	–	–	2
58	(France) Olivier Tabatoni	–	–	2	–	–	–	–	–	–	–	–	–	2
58	(Kenya) Javaid Alam	–	–	–	2	–	–	–	–	–	–	–	–	2
58	(Greece) Anastasios Gemenis	–	–	–	–	–	2	–	–	–	–	–	–	2
58	(New Zealand) Paul Adams	–	–	–	–	–	–	2	–	–	–	–	–	2
58	(Finland) Seppo Mustonen	–	–	–	–	–	–	–	–	2	–	–	–	2
58	(Italy) Livio Lupidi	–	–	–	–	–	–	–	–	–	2	–	–	2
66	(West Germany) Jürgen Barth	1	–	–	–	–	–	–	–	–	–	–	–	1
66	(Sweden) Mikael Ericsson	–	1	–	–	–	–	–	–	–	–	–	–	1
66	(Brazil) Jorge Fleck	–	–	1	–	–	–	–	–	–	–	–	–	1
66	(Kenya) Ramesh Khoda	–	–	–	1	–	–	–	–	–	–	–	–	1
66	(France) Robert Simonetti	–	–	–	–	1	–	–	–	–	–	–	–	1
66	(West Germany) Fritz Heisler	–	–	–	–	–	1	–	–	–	–	–	–	1
66	(New Zealand) Reg Cook	–	–	–	–	–	–	1	–	–	–	–	–	1
66	(Finland) Henri Palmroos	–	–	–	–	–	–	–	–	1	–	–	–	1
66	(Italy) Vittorio Caneva	–	–	–	–	–	–	–	–	–	1	–	–	1
66	(United Kingdom) Malcolm Wilson	–	–	–	–	–	–	–	–	–	–	–	1	1

1982 World Rally Championship point awards for drivers
Points awarded by finish	1st	2nd	3rd	4th	5th	6th	7th	8th	9th	10th
Points awarded by finish	20	15	12	10	8	6	4	3	2	1

== Events ==
1982 World Rally Championship event map
Black = Tarmac	Brown = Gravel	Blue = Snow/Ice	Red = Mixed Surface

1982 World Rally Championship schedule and results
Round	Rally name	Stages	Podium finishers				
Round	Rally name	Stages	Rank	Driver	Co-driver	Car	Time
1	(Monaco) Monte Carlo Rally (16–22 January)	32 stages 753 km Tarmac	1	(West Germany) Walter Röhrl	(West Germany) Christian Geistdörfer	Opel Ascona 400	8:20:33
1	(Monaco) Monte Carlo Rally (16–22 January)	32 stages 753 km Tarmac	2	(Finland) Hannu Mikkola	(Sweden) Arne Hertz	Audi Quattro	8:24:22
1	(Monaco) Monte Carlo Rally (16–22 January)	32 stages 753 km Tarmac	3	(France) Jean-Luc Thérier	(France) Michel Vial	Porsche 911 SC	8:32:38
2	(Sweden) Swedish Rally (12–14 February)	25 stages 358 km Snow/Ice	1	(Sweden) Stig Blomqvist	(Sweden) Björn Cederberg	Audi Quattro	3:40:15
2	(Sweden) Swedish Rally (12–14 February)	25 stages 358 km Snow/Ice	2	(Finland) Ari Vatanen	(United Kingdom) Terry Harryman	Ford Escort RS1800	3:42:51
2	(Sweden) Swedish Rally (12–14 February)	25 stages 358 km Snow/Ice	3	(West Germany) Walter Röhrl	(West Germany) Christian Geistdörfer	Opel Ascona 400	3:44:29
3	Rallye de Portugal (2–8 March)	40 stages 639 km Gravel/Tarmac	1	(France) Michèle Mouton	(Italy) Fabrizia Pons	Audi Quattro	7:39:36
3	Rallye de Portugal (2–8 March)	40 stages 639 km Gravel/Tarmac	2	(Sweden) Per Eklund	(Sweden) Ragnar Spjuth	Toyota Celica 2000GT	7:52:43
3	Rallye de Portugal (2–8 March)	40 stages 639 km Gravel/Tarmac	3	(Austria) Franz Wittmann	(West Germany) Peter Diekmann	Audi Quattro	8:07:25
4	(Kenya) Safari Rally (8–12 April)	83 controls 5120 km Gravel	1	(Kenya) Shekhar Mehta	(Kenya) Mike Doughty	Datsun Violet GT	+4:26 pen
4	(Kenya) Safari Rally (8–12 April)	83 controls 5120 km Gravel	2	(West Germany) Walter Röhrl	(West Germany) Christian Geistdörfer	Opel Ascona 400	+5:07 pen
4	(Kenya) Safari Rally (8–12 April)	83 controls 5120 km Gravel	3	(Kenya) Mike Kirkland	(Kenya) Anton Levitan	Datsun Violet GT	+6:16 pen
5	(France) Tour de Corse (6–8 May)	27 stages 1176 km Tarmac	1	(France) Jean Ragnotti	(France) Jean-Marc Andrié	Renault 5 Turbo	14:11:19
5	(France) Tour de Corse (6–8 May)	27 stages 1176 km Tarmac	2	(France) Jean-Claude Andruet	(France) 'Biche'	Ferrari 308 GTB	14:16:57
5	(France) Tour de Corse (6–8 May)	27 stages 1176 km Tarmac	3	(France) Bernard Béguin	(France) Jean-Jacques Lenne	Porsche 911 SC	14:20:11
6	(Greece) Acropolis Rally (31 May–3 June)	56 stages 967 km Gravel	1	(France) Michèle Mouton	(Italy) Fabrizia Pons	Audi Quattro	12:54:44
6	(Greece) Acropolis Rally (31 May–3 June)	56 stages 967 km Gravel	2	(West Germany) Walter Röhrl	(West Germany) Christian Geistdörfer	Opel Ascona 400	13:08:23
6	(Greece) Acropolis Rally (31 May–3 June)	56 stages 967 km Gravel	3	(Finland) Henri Toivonen	(United Kingdom) Fred Gallagher	Opel Ascona 400	13:17:21
7	Rally New Zealand (26–29 June)	38 stages 1014 km Gravel	1	(Sweden) Björn Waldegård	(Sweden) Hans Thorszelius	Toyota Celica 2000GT	10:28:08
7	Rally New Zealand (26–29 June)	38 stages 1014 km Gravel	2	(Sweden) Per Eklund	(Sweden) Ragnar Spjuth	Toyota Celica 2000GT	10:31:21
7	Rally New Zealand (26–29 June)	38 stages 1014 km Gravel	3	(West Germany) Walter Röhrl	(West Germany) Christian Geistdörfer	Opel Ascona 400	10:33:37
8	(Brazil) Rallye do Brasil (11–14 August)	29 stages 706 km Gravel	1	(France) Michèle Mouton	(Italy) Fabrizia Pons	Audi Quattro	8:16:24
8	(Brazil) Rallye do Brasil (11–14 August)	29 stages 706 km Gravel	2	(West Germany) Walter Röhrl	(West Germany) Christian Geistdörfer	Opel Ascona 400	8:51:49
8	(Brazil) Rallye do Brasil (11–14 August)	29 stages 706 km Gravel	3	(Uruguay) Domingo de Vitta	(Uruguay) Daniel Muzio	Ford Escort 1.6	10:15:30
9	(Finland) 1000 Lakes Rally (27–29 August)	46 stages 469 km Gravel	1	(Finland) Hannu Mikkola	(Sweden) Arne Hertz	Audi Quattro	4:19:05
9	(Finland) 1000 Lakes Rally (27–29 August)	46 stages 469 km Gravel	2	(Sweden) Stig Blomqvist	(Sweden) Björn Cederberg	Audi Quattro	4:19:33
9	(Finland) 1000 Lakes Rally (27–29 August)	46 stages 469 km Gravel	3	(Finland) Pentti Airikkala	(Finland) Juha Piironen	Mitsubishi Lancer Turbo	4:23:22
10	(Italy) Rallye Sanremo (3–8 October)	56 stages 735 km Gravel/Tarmac	1	(Sweden) Stig Blomqvist	(Sweden) Björn Cederberg	Audi Quattro	8:37:47
10	(Italy) Rallye Sanremo (3–8 October)	56 stages 735 km Gravel/Tarmac	2	(Finland) Hannu Mikkola	(Sweden) Arne Hertz	Audi Quattro	8:40:03
10	(Italy) Rallye Sanremo (3–8 October)	56 stages 735 km Gravel/Tarmac	3	(West Germany) Walter Röhrl	(West Germany) Christian Geistdörfer	Opel Ascona 400	8:40:14
11	(Ivory Coast) Rallye Côte d'Ivoire (27 October–1 November)	54 controls 4995 km Gravel	1	(West Germany) Walter Röhrl	(West Germany) Christian Geistdörfer	Opel Ascona 400	+8:43 pen
11	(Ivory Coast) Rallye Côte d'Ivoire (27 October–1 November)	54 controls 4995 km Gravel	2	(Sweden) Per Eklund	(Sweden) Ragnar Spjuth	Toyota Celica 2000GT	+10:17 pen
11	(Ivory Coast) Rallye Côte d'Ivoire (27 October–1 November)	54 controls 4995 km Gravel	3	(Sweden) Björn Waldegård	(Sweden) Hans Thorszelius	Toyota Celica 2000GT	+11:00 pen
12	(United Kingdom) RAC Rally (21–25 November)	68 stages 716 km Gravel/Tarmac	1	(Finland) Hannu Mikkola	(Sweden) Arne Hertz	Audi Quattro	8:01:46
12	(United Kingdom) RAC Rally (21–25 November)	68 stages 716 km Gravel/Tarmac	2	(France) Michèle Mouton	(Italy) Fabrizia Pons	Audi Quattro	8:06:03
12	(United Kingdom) RAC Rally (21–25 November)	68 stages 716 km Gravel/Tarmac	3	(Finland) Henri Toivonen	(United Kingdom) Fred Gallagher	Opel Ascona 400	8:06:12

== See also ==
- 1982 in sports
