= 1974 1000 Lakes Rally =

1974 1000 Lakes Rally 24nd Jyväskylän Suurajot
Round 3 of the 1974 World Rally Championship season
← Previous event	Next event →
- Host country: Finland
- Rally base: Jyväskylä, Finland
- Dates run: 2 August – 4 August 1974
- Length: 1 km (0.62 miles)
- Stage surface: Gravel
- Overall distance: 1,179.90 km (733.16 miles) (approx.)

Statistics
- Crews: 117 at start, 88 at finish

Overall results
- Overall winner: (Finland) Hannu Mikkola (United Kingdom) John Davenport (United States) Ford

The 1974 1000 Lakes Rally (formally the 24nd Jyväskylän Suurajot) was the third round of the shortened 1974 World Rally Championship. It took place between 2 and 4 August 1974. The 1000 Lakes Rally didn't use special stages at this time to decide a winner. Instead all of the route was competitive - with the driver with the lowest accumulation of penalty time between time controls being declared the winner.

== Report ==
The 1000 Lakes Rally was the third round of the World Rally Championship. The Race had 36 stages and was won by Hannu Mikkola.

The points system at the time meant that Ford got 20 points for their double victory, third-placed Markku Alén took 12 points for Fiat, and Stig Blomqvist got 10 points for Saab. The fifth through seventh place finishers received no points as they finished behind their team mates; the next and final points went to Anders Kulläng who got 3 points for Opel. No points were given for the ninth and tenth place finishers (in a Fiat and an Opel).

== Results ==
Pos.	#	Group	Driver	Co-driver	Car	Time	Difference	Points
1974 1000 Lakes Rally results
1.	6	10	(Finland) Hannu Mikkola	(United Kingdom) John Davenport	(United Kingdom) Ford Escort RS1600	3:11:42	0:0	20
2.	1	10	(Finland) Timo Mäkinen	(United Kingdom) Henry Liddon	(United Kingdom) Ford Escort RS1600	3:12:13	00:31	
3.	3	10	(Finland) Markku Alén	(Finland) Ilkka Kivimäki	(Italy) Fiat 124 Abarth Rallye	3:13:52	2:10	12
4.	2	10	(Sweden) Stig Blomqvist	(Sweden) Hans Sylvan	(Sweden) Saab 96 V4	3:14:02	2:20	10
5.	7	10	(Finland) Simo Lampinen	(Finland) Juhani Markkanen	(Sweden) Saab 96 V4	3:17:33	5:51	
6.	5	10	(Finland) Leo Kinnunen	(Finland) Atso Aho	(Italy) Fiat 124 Abarth Rallye	3:17:54	6:12	
7.	11	10	(Finland) Tapio Rainio	(Finland) Erkki Nyman	(Sweden) Saab 96 V4	3:19:16	7:34	
8.	13	10	(Sweden) Anders Kulläng	(Sweden) Claes-Göran Anderson	(Germany) Opel Ascona	3:21:26	9:44	3
9.	25	10	(Finland) Antti Ojanen	(Finland) Timo Mäkelä	(Italy) Fiat 124 Abarth Rallye	3:21:35	9:53	
10.	9	10	(Sweden) Björn Waldegård	(Sweden) Arne Hertz	(Germany) Opel Ascona	3:23:05	11:23	
11.	27	10	(Finland) Jari Vilkas	(Finland) Juhani Soini	(Sweden) Saab 96 V4	3:24:02	12:20	
12.	34	10	(Finland) Hannu Valtaharju	(Finland) Risto Antilla	(Germany) Opel Ascona	3:26:05	14:23	
13.	4	10	(Germany) Achim Warmbold	(France) Jean Todt	(Germany) BMW 2002	3:26:24	14:42	
14.	37	10	(Finland) Heikki Enomaa	(Finland) Matti Honkavaara	(Germany) BMW 2002	3:27:47	16:05	
15.	26	10	(Finland) Erkki Pitkänen	(Finland) Juhani Paalama	(Sweden) Volvo 142	3:28:12	16:30	
16.	29	5	(Finland) Pentti Airikkala	(Finland) Heikki Haaksiala	(United Kingdom) Vauxhall Magnum Coupé	3:28:31	16:49	
17.	31	5	(Finland) Kyösti Hämäläinen	(Finland) Veijo Aho	(Italy) Alfa Romeo 2000 GTV	3:30:06	18:24	
18.	15	10	(Italy) Sergio Barbasio	(Italy) Piero Sodano	(Italy) Fiat 124 Abarth Rallye	3:30:10	18:28	
19.	14	10	(Italy) Alcide Paganelli	(Italy) Ninni Russo	(Italy) Fiat 124 Abarth Rallye	3:35:06	23:24	
20.	32	4	(Finland) Pertti Kärhä	(Finland) Seppo Siitonen	(United Kingdom) Sunbeam Avenger	3:35:56	24:14	
21.	10	10	(Sweden) Harry Källström	(Sweden) Claes Billstam	(Japan) Datsun 160J	3:38:21	26:39	
22.	43	3	(Finland) Timo Salonen	(Finland) Seppo Harjanne	(Japan) Mazda 1300	3:38:38	26:56	
23.	33	10	(Sweden) Börje Nilsson	(Sweden) Anderd Olsson	(Sweden) Volvo 142	3:38:58	27:16	
24.	21	8	(United Kingdom) Brian Culcheth	(United Kingdom) Johnstone Syer	(United Kingdom) Morris Marina 1300	3:39:39	27:57	
25.	20	3	(Finland) Pauli Toivonen	(Finland) Martti Tiukkanen	(France) Simca Rallye 2	3:40:09	28:27	
26.	35	8	(Norway) John Haugland	(Norway) Asbjørn Fløene	(Czechoslovakia) Škoda 120	3:41:34	29:52	
27.	41	10	(Finland) Johan Wiklund	(Sweden) Lars-Erik Karlsson	(Germany) BMW 2002	3:42:46	31:04	
28.	55	11	(Finland) Eeva Heinonen	(Finland) Seija Saaristo-Kivistö	(Sweden) Volvo 142	3:43:00	31:18	
29.	80	10	(Finland) Martti Seitsola	(Finland) Jorma Vuoriluoto	(Sweden) Saab 96 V4	3:43:24	31:42	
30.	40	5	(Finland) Kyösti Saari	(Finland) Risto Saari	(Italy) Alfa Romeo 2000 GTV	3:43:35	31:53	
31.	70	5	(Finland) Salo Seppo	(Finland) Simo Pyykkönen	(Germany) Opel Ascona	3:43:50	32:08	
32.	36	10	(Finland) Hannu Valkonen	(Finland) Eero Poutiainen	(Germany) Opel Ascona	3:44:47	33:05	
33.	42	9	(Finland) Risto Minkkinen	(Finland) Kyösti Järvikallio	(Sweden) Saab 96 V4	3:45:10	33:28	
34.	65	5	(Finland) Timo Jouhki	(Finland) Juha Piironen	(Italy) Alfa Romeo 2000 GTV	3:45:14	33:32	
35.	66	10	(Finland) Matti Johansson	(Finland) Reijo Hagström	(Sweden) Saab 96 V4	3:45:32	33:50	
36.	84	10	(Finland) Reijo Grönroos	(Finland) Kaj Häkkinen	(Sweden) Volvo 142	3:47:20	35:38	
37.	110	10	(Finland) Matti Arikoski	(Finland) Jouko Hartikainen	(Sweden) Volvo 142	3:47:25	35:43	
38.	54	5	(Finland) Erkki Pahkinen	(Finland) Jarmo Toivonen	(Germany) Opel Ascona	3:47:59	36:17	
39.	53	5	(Finland) Juha Leponiemi	(Finland) Matti Vilmi	(Germany) BMW 2002	3:48:03	36:21	
40.	45	3	(Finland) Jaakko Markula	(Finland) Asko Nevalainen	(Italy) Alfa Romeo Alfasud	3:48:16	36:34	
41.	16	3	(France) Bernard Fiorentino	(France) Francis Murac	(France) Simca Rallye 2	3:50:07	38:25	
42.	47	10	(Finland) Kari Suominen	(Finland) Reino Suominen	(Sweden) Volvo 142	3:50:28	38:46	
43.	52	3	(Finland) Esko Nuuttila	(Finland) Olli Nuuttila	(Germany) Opel Kadett 1200	3:51:09	39:27	
44.	106	5	(Finland) John Hanslin	(Finland) Kim Hanslin	(United Kingdom) Ford Capri 3000	3:51:49	40:07	
45.	46	8	(Finland) Kauko Mäkelä	(Finland) Jukka Miettinen	(France) Peugeot 304 S	3:51:55	40:13	
46.	69	4	(Finland) Hans Sevelius	(Finland) Göran Sandström	(Italy) Alfa Romeo Giulia Super	3:52:10	40:28	
47.	51	5	(Sweden) Matti Raivio	(Finland) Esa Kytöjoki	(Germany) BMW 2002	3:53:10	41:28	
48.	78	5	(Finland) Curt Nelskylä	(Finland) Rolf Mesterton	(Germany) BMW 2002	3:54:26	42:44	
49.	107	8	(Soviet Union) Vladimir Kulyukin	(Soviet Union) Stanislav Yakovlev	(Soviet Union) Lada 1200	3:54:54	43:12	
50.	119	3	(Finland) Matti Hissa	(Finland) Pekka Kyröhonka	(United Kingdom) Ford Escort 1300	3:55:55	44:13	
51.	48	5	(Finland) Viljo Metso	(Finland) Keijo Itkonen	(Germany) Opel Ascona	3:56:46	45:04	
52.	64	10	(United Kingdom) David Thompson	(United Kingdom) Karen Blackburn	(United Kingdom) Vauxhall Firenza	3:57:08	45:26	
53.	62	5	(Finland) Kari Elomaa	(Finland) Timo Hantunen	(Germany) Opel RK	3:57:27	45:45	
54.	72	9	(Soviet Union) Stasys Brundza	(Soviet Union) Viljus Sagatauskas	(Soviet Union) Moskvitch 412	3:58:47	47:05	
55.	73	10	(Finland) Pertti Järvinen	(Finland) Matti Riihimäki	(Sweden) Volvo 142	3:58:47	47:05	
56.	44	5	(France) Christian Dorche	(France) Pierre Gertosio	(Germany) BMW 2002	3:59:55	48:13	
57.	76	8	(Finland) Hannu Wallinheimo	(Finland) Kari Wallinheimo	(Czechoslovakia) Škoda 120	3:59:55	48:13	
58.	19	9	(Finland) Onni Vilkas	(Finland) Paavo Riikonen	(Germany) BMW 1602	4:02:17	50:35	
59.	71	9	(Finland) Pekka Vilpponen	(Finland) Ilpo Airila	(Soviet Union) Moskvitch 1500	4:02:30	50:48	
60.	74	10	(Sweden) Åke Thunberg	(Sweden) Lars Edvall	(France) Peugeot 404	4:04:35	52:53	
61.	68	10	(United Kingdom) Peter Thompson	(United Kingdom) Alan Blackburn	(United Kingdom) Vauxhall Firenza	4:05:01	53:19	
62.	60	11	(Finland) Marianne Avomeri	(Finland) Satu Valtaharju	(France) Simca Rallye 2	4:06:22	54:40	
63.	94	5	(Finland) Hannu Merikanto	(Finland) Erkki Pakkanen	(Germany) Opel Ascona	4:06:29	54:47	
64.	75	9	(Soviet Union) Vladimir Bubnov	(Soviet Union) Anatoliy Pechenkin	(Soviet Union) Moskvitch 412	4:07:37	55:55	
65.	61	5	(Finland) Raimo Hämeenniemi	(Finland) Jaakko Pikkarainen	(Germany) Opel RK	4:08:17	56:35	
66.	93	8	(Finland) Reijo af Heurlin	(Finland) Sakaru Aaltonen	(Japan) Datsun 100A	4:08:46	57:04	
67.	118	3	(Finland) Erkki Könönen	(Finland) Raimo Könönen	(United Kingdom) Ford Escort 1300	4:08:46	57:04	
68.	102	3	(Finland) Asko Mäkelä	(Finland) Raimo Mäkinen	(Soviet Union) Lada 1200	4:09:33	57:51	
69.	95	9	(Soviet Union) Nikolay Kirpichnikov	(Soviet Union) Yakov Agishev	(Soviet Union) Moskvitch 1500	4:09:41	57:59	
70.	58	11	(Norway) Trine Jensen	(Norway) Mette Bråthen	(United Kingdom) Ford Escort Mexico	4:11:06	59:24	
71.	105	9	(Soviet Union) Anatolit Grigoryev	(Soviet Union) Semen Sokolov	(Soviet Union) Moskvitch 412	4:11:08	59:26	
72.	113	5	(Finland) Sauli Haapala	(Finland) Jorma Palovuori	(Italy) Alfa Romeo 2000 GTV	4:13:52	1:02:10	
73.	103	10	(United Kingdom) Norman Anstiss	(United Kingdom) John Haswell	(United Kingdom) Ford Escort RS1600	4:15:19	1:03:37	
74.	97	10	(Sweden) Eino Honkamäki	(Sweden) Tommy Karlsson	(Sweden) Saab 96 V4	4:15:51	1:04:09	
75.	90	8	(Finland) Ukko Kervinen	(Finland) Jouko Raappana	(Japan) Datsun 100A	4:18:54	1:07:12	
76.	67	10	(United Kingdom) David Sutton	(United Kingdom) Peter Warren	(United Kingdom) Ford Escort RS1600	4:21:10	1:09:28	
77.	98	2	(Finland) Kari Kemmo	(Finland) Rauli Tainio	(France) Simca 1100	4:21:24	1:09:42	
78.	116	10	(Germany) Wolfgang Neumann	(Germany) Horst Hartsch	(Germany) BMW 2002	4:21:45	1:10:03	
79.	108	6	(East Germany) Eberhard Asmus	(East Germany) Christian Meischner	(East Germany) Trabant P601	4:22:53	1:11:11	
80.	56	11	(United Kingdom) Jill Robinson	(Finland) Kirsti Airikkala	(Italy) Alfa Romeo 2000 GTV	4:23:52	1:12:10	
81.	101	5	(Norway) Anders Tollaas	(Norway) Jarl Skogmo	(Germany) Opel Ascona	4:24:48	1:13:06	
82.	117	6	(East Germany) Hans Ullmann	(East Germany) Werner Lange	(East Germany) Trabant P601	4:26:38	1:14:56	
83.	114	6	(East Germany) Franz Galle	(East Germany) Jochen Müller	(East Germany) Trabant P601	4:32:57	1:21:15	
84.	104	6	(East Germany) Helmut Piehler	(East Germany) Klaus Riedel	(East Germany) Trabant P601	4:34:43	1:23:01	
85.	91	9	(Soviet Union) Andrey Shishkov	(Soviet Union) Mikhail Titov	(Soviet Union) Moskvitch 1500	4:41:20	1:29:38	
86.	115	9	(United Kingdom) Roger Hancock	(United Kingdom) Keith Lay	(United Kingdom) Ford Cortina Lotus	4:42:06	1:30:24	
87.	109	2	(Germany) Gerhard Verlaan	(Germany) Norbert Diebald	(France) Peugeot 104	4:42:17	1:30:35	
88.	99	3	(France) Jean-Claude Lucas	(France) Brigitte Baldini	(France) Simca 1100	4:46:32	1:34:50	
-	12	10	(Sweden) Per Eklund	(Sweden) Björn Cederberg	(Sweden) Saab 96 V4	Retired (Accident)		
-	17	2	(East Germany) Egon Culmbacher	(East Germany) Werner Ernst	(East Germany) Wartburg 353	Retired (Retired)		
-	18	6	(Finland) Vesa Nieminen	(Finland) Seppo Jämsä	(United Kingdom) Morris Mini 850	Retired (Accident)		
-	22	9	(Norway) Trond Schea	(Norway) Per Bakke	(Soviet Union) Lada 1500	Retired (Retired)		
-	23	10	(Sweden) Bror Danielsson	(Sweden) Bo Sundberg	(Sweden) Opel Ascona	Retired (Accident Damage)		
-	24	10	(Finland) Ulf Grönholm	(Finland) Juhani Toivonen	(Japan) Datsun 160J	Retired (Retired)		
-	28	10	(Finland) Ari Vatanen	(Finland) Alf Krogelll	(Germany) Opel Ascona	Retired (Lost Wheel)		
-	30	10	(Finland) Pekka Haavisto	(Finland) Risto Toivonen	(Sweden) Volvo 142	Retired (Retired)		
-	38	8	(Finland) Markku Saaristo	(Finland) Timo Alanen	(Czechoslovakia) Škoda 120	Retired (Retired)		
-	39	4	(Finland) Pekka Virtanen	(Finland) Asko Harvala	(United Kingdom) Sunbeam Avenger	Retired (Retired)		
-	49	5	(France) Bruno Saby	(France) Jean-Christian Court-Payen	(Germany) Opel Ascona	Retired (Mechanical)		
-	50	5	(Finland) Pentti Ahonen	(Finland) Ensio Salonen	(Germany) BMW 2002	Retired (Retired)		
-	57	11	(Finland) Marketta Oksala	(Finland) Terttu Aho	(Italy) Fiat 124 Abarth Rallye	Retired (Retired)		
-	63	10	(Sweden) Peter Thors	(Sweden) Börje Hellqvist	(Sweden) Volvo 142	Retired (Retired)		
-	77	9	(United Kingdom) Paul Appleby	(United Kingdom) Keith O'Dell	(United Kingdom) Ford Escort Twim Cam	Retired (Retired)		
-	79	10	(Sweden) Jan-Olav Jansson	(Sweden) Ingemar Persson	(Germany) Opel Ascona	Retired (Retired)		
-	81	10	(Sweden) Morgan Carlsson	(Sweden) Claes Uddgren	(Sweden) Volvo 142	Retired (Retired)		
-	82	8	(Soviet Union) Leontijus Potapčikas	(Soviet Union) Lev Shuvalov	(Soviet Union) Lada 1500	Retired (Retired)		
-	83	4	(Finland) Raimo Martelius	(Finland) Juhani Honkanen	(Italy) Alfa Romeo Giulia Super	Retired (Retired)		
-	85	8	(Soviet Union) Kastytis Girdauskas	(Soviet Union) Arvydas Girdauskas	(Soviet Union) Lada 1200	Retired (Retired)		
-	86	7	(East Germany) Horst Niebergall	(East Germany) Bernhard Malsch	(East Germany) Wartburg 353	Retired (Retired)		
-	87	7	(Finland) Kai Miesmäki	(Finland) Timo Saaristo	(United Kingdom) Sunbeam 900	Retired (Retired)		
-	88	8	(Soviet Union) Yuriy Kozlov	(Soviet Union) Uldis Madrevic	(Soviet Union) Lada 1200	Retired (Retired)		
-	89	10	(Austria) Gernot Gleiss	(Austria) Bernd Tatschl	(United Kingdom) Ford Escort RS1600	Retired (Retired)		
-	92	7	(United Kingdom) Richard Rowland	(United Kingdom) Howard Cooper	(Czechoslovakia) Škoda 120	Retired (Retired)		
-	96	7	(East Germany) Frank Mielke	(East Germany) Eberhard Tröger	(East Germany) Wartburg 353	Retired (Retired)		
-	100	8	(Soviet Union) Anatoliy Kozyrchikov	(Soviet Union) V. V. Nikolajev	(Soviet Union) Lada 1200	Retired (Retired)		
-	111	4	(Finland) Tom Borup	(Finland) Reijo Mäkelä	(Italy) Alfa Romeo 1600 GTJ	Retired (Retired)		
-	112	3	(Finland) Kelle Möller	(Finland) Erkki Lahtinen	(France) Simca Rallye 2	Retired (Retired)		
-	120	8	(Finland) Timo Apponen	(Finland) Jari Kiviniemi	(United Kingdom) Ford Escort 1300	Retired (Retired)		

Source:eWRC Results

== Championship Standings after event ==
Rank	Manufacturer	Event								Total points
Rank	Manufacturer	POR (Portugal)	KEN (Kenya)	FIN (Finland)	ITA (Italy)	CAN (Canada)	USA (United States)	GBR (United Kingdom)	FRA (France)	Total points
1	(Italy) Fiat	20	1	12	-	-	-	-	-	33
2	(United States) Ford	2	2	20	-	-	-	-	-	24
3	(Japan) Mitsubishi	-	20	-	-	-	-	-	-	20
4	(Japan) Datsun	8	10		-	-	-	-	-	18
5	(Germany) Porsche	-	15	-	-	-	-	-	-	15
6	(Italy) Lancia	-	12	-	-	-	-	-	-	12
7	(Japan) Toyota	10	-	-	-	-	-	-	-	10
7	(Sweden) Saab	-	-	10	-	-	-	-	-	10
9	(France) Alpine-Renault	6	-	-	-	-	-	-	-	6
10	(Germany) BMW	4	-	-	-	-	-	-	-	4
10	(France) Peugeot	-	4	-	-	-	-	-	-	4
12	(France) Citroën	3	-	-	-	-	-	-	-	3
12	(Germany) Opel	-	-	3	-	-	-	-	-	3
