= Edsvalla =

- Location within Sweden
- Coordinates: 59°26′N 13°11′E
- Country: Sweden
- Province: Värmland
- County: Värmland County
- Municipality: Karlstad Municipality

Area
  - Total: 1.46 km^{2} (0.56 sq mi)

Population (31 December 2010)
  - Total: 1,016
  - Density: 698/km^{2} (1,810/sq mi)
- Time zone: UTC+1 (CET)
  - Summer (DST): UTC+2 (CEST)

Edsvalla is a locality situated in Karlstad Municipality, Värmland County, Sweden with 1,016 inhabitants in 2010.

== Famous people ==
- Jonas Brodin, a hockey defenseman for the Minnesota Wild in the National Hockey League, was raised in Edsvalla.
- Mats Jonsson, a World Rally Championship driver and 1992 and 1993 Rally Sweden champion, is from Edsvalla.
