= Rally Sweden =

Annual rallying competition in Sweden

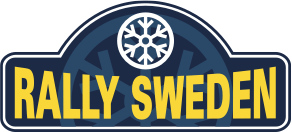
- Status: active
- Genre: motorsporting event
- Date: February
- Frequency: annual
- Locations: Umeå, Västerbotten
- Country: Sweden
- Inaugurated: 1950

The Rally Sweden (Swedish: Svenska rallyt), formerly the KAK-Rally, the International Swedish Rally, and later the Uddeholm Swedish Rally, is an automobile rally competition held in February in Värmland, Sweden and relocated to Umeå in 2022. First held in 1950, as a summer rally called the Rally to the Midnight Sun (Swedish: Midnattssolsrallyt) with start and finish at separate locations, seventeen years later both start and finish became located in Karlstad. The main service park is located in the town of Torsby, which is actually much closer to the special stages than Karlstad. The competition is spread out over three days with the start of the first part on Friday morning and the finish on Sunday afternoon.

In 1973 the rally was introduced to the World Rally Championship and started to get international attention; the Swedish Rally has been also traditionally the only rally held on snow. Like Rally Finland, for many years the rally was known to be very difficult for non-Nordic drivers. The first driver to win the Swedish Rally not hailing from Sweden or Finland was Frenchman Sébastien Loeb in 2004; Frenchman Sébastien Ogier was the second non-Nordic winner (with wins in 2013, 2015 and 2016), and since then Belgian Thierry Neuville and Welshman Elfyn Evans have also recorded wins at the event. Estonian Ott Tänak also won in 2019 and 2023, but the question of whether or not Estonia is a "Nordic" country remains an open debate. Spaniard Carlos Sainz finished second four times and third two times.

The rally has been cancelled three times; in 1974 due to the oil crisis, in 1990 because of the mild weather and in 2021 due to COVID-19 pandemic. The rally was also not held in 2009 due to the WRC's round rotation system. Weather continues to be a concern, as rising global temperatures reduce the likelihood of appropriately snowy conditions every year. The 2005 event was one of the warmest ever, turning many stages into mud and destroying the special studded snow tires used by the teams.

In 2021 it was announced that Rally Sweden would relocate to the northern Swedish city of Umeå after being held in the province of Värmland since its foundation. The primary reason for its relocation was that Umeå is considered a more snow safe region.

In October 2026, the rally faced scrutiny over its financial situation following reports that the organizing company, Rally Sweden AB, had accumulated a deficit of approximately 16 million Swedish kronor. Concerns were also raised regarding the use of municipal funding intended for the 2027 event and the resignation of several board members. The company's CEO, Anna Nordkvist, disputed reports that the organization was facing imminent bankruptcy, while acknowledging its financial difficulties. Despite the controversy, preparations continued for the 2027 edition in Umeå.

== Results ==
=== 1950 through 1969 ===
Rally name	Stages	Podium finishers			
Rally name	Stages	Rank	Driver Co-driver	Team Car	Time
1st International Swedish Rally; 1950	–	1	Per-Fredrik Cederbaum	BMW	– h : – m : – s
2nd International Swedish Rally; 1951	–	1	Gunnar Bengtsson	Talbot-Lago	– h : – m : – s
3rd International Swedish Rally; 1952	–	1	Grus-Olle Persson	Porsche	– h : – m : – s
4th International Swedish Rally; 1953	–	1	Sture Nottorp	Porsche	– h : – m : – s
5th International Swedish Rally; 1954	–	1	Carl-Gunnar Hammarlund	Porsche	– h : – m : – s
6th International Swedish Rally; 1955	–	1	Allan Borgefors	Porsche	– h : – m : – s
7th International Swedish Rally; 1956	–	1	Harry Bengtsson	Volkswagen	– h : – m : – s
8th International Swedish Rally; 1957	–	1	Ture Jansson	Volvo	– h : – m : – s
9th International Swedish Rally; 1958	–	1	Gunnar Andersson	Volvo	– h : – m : – s
10th International Swedish Rally; 1959	–	1	Erik Carlsson	Saab 93	– h : – m : – s
11th International Swedish Rally; 1960	–	1	Carl-Magnus Skogh	Saab	– h : – m : – s
12th International Swedish Rally; 1961	–	1	Carl-Magnus Skogh	Saab	– h : – m : – s
13th International Swedish Rally; 1962	–	1	Bengt Söderström	British Motor Corporation	– h : – m : – s
14th International Swedish Rally; 1963	–	1	Berndt Jansson	Porsche	– h : – m : – s
15th International Swedish Rally; 1964	–	1	Tom Trana	Volvo	– h : – m : – s
16th International Swedish Rally; 1965	–	1	Tom Trana	Volvo	– h : – m : – s
17th International Swedish Rally; 1966	–	1	Åke Andersson	Saab	– h : – m : – s
18th International Swedish Rally; 1967	–	1	Bengt Söderström	Ford	– h : – m : – s
19th International Swedish Rally; 1968	–	1	Björn Waldegård; Lars Helmér	Porsche	– h : – m : – s
20th International Swedish Rally; 1969	–	1	Björn Waldegård; Lars Helmér	Porsche 911 L	13 h : 21 m : 42 s

=== 1970 through 1985 ===
Rally name	Stages	Podium finishers			
Rally name	Stages	Rank	Driver Co-driver	Team Car	Time
21st International Swedish Rally; 11 to 15 February 1970; Round 2 of the International Championship for Manufacturers	40 stages 1282 km	1	Björn Waldegård; Lars Helmér	Porsche 911S	12 h : 20 m : 50 s
21st International Swedish Rally; 11 to 15 February 1970; Round 2 of the International Championship for Manufacturers	40 stages 1282 km	2	Stig Blomqvist; Bo Reinicke	Saab 96 V4	12 h : 44 m : 6 s
21st International Swedish Rally; 11 to 15 February 1970; Round 2 of the International Championship for Manufacturers	40 stages 1282 km	3	Lillebror Nasenius; Björn Cederberg	Opel Kadett Rallye	12 h : 59 m : 33 s
22nd International Swedish Rally; 17 to 21 February 1971; Round 2 of the International Championship for Manufacturers	39 stages	1	Stig Blomqvist; Arne Hertz	Saab 96 V4	8 h : 35 m : 29 s
22nd International Swedish Rally; 17 to 21 February 1971; Round 2 of the International Championship for Manufacturers	39 stages	2	Lars Nyström; Gunnar Nyström	BMW 2002 TI	8 h : 40 m : 42 s
22nd International Swedish Rally; 17 to 21 February 1971; Round 2 of the International Championship for Manufacturers	39 stages	3	Harry Källström; Gunnar Häggborn	Lancia Fulvia 1.6 Coupé HF	8 h : 41 m : 36 s
23rd International Swedish Rally; 17 to 20 February 1972; Round 2 of the International Championship for Manufacturers	37 stages 802 km	1	Stig Blomqvist; Arne Hertz	Saab 96 V4	7 h : 43 m : 28 s
23rd International Swedish Rally; 17 to 20 February 1972; Round 2 of the International Championship for Manufacturers	37 stages 802 km	2	Björn Waldegård; Lars Helmér	Porsche 911S	7 h : 47 m : 44 s
23rd International Swedish Rally; 17 to 20 February 1972; Round 2 of the International Championship for Manufacturers	37 stages 802 km	3	Harry Källström; Gunnar Häggborn	Lancia Fulvia 1.6 Coupé HF	7 h : 52 m : 32 s
24th International Swedish Rally; 15 to 18 February 1973; Round 2 of the 1973 World Rally Championship	36 stages 1800 km	1	Stig Blomqvist; Arne Hertz	Saab 96 V4	9 h : 18 m : 31 s
24th International Swedish Rally; 15 to 18 February 1973; Round 2 of the 1973 World Rally Championship	36 stages 1800 km	2	Per Eklund; Rolf Carlsson	Saab 96 V4	9 h : 20 m : 53 s
24th International Swedish Rally; 15 to 18 February 1973; Round 2 of the 1973 World Rally Championship	36 stages 1800 km	3	Jean-Luc Thérier; Marcel Callewaert	Alpine Renault A110 1800	9 h : 34 m : 12 s
1974 rally cancelled
25th International Swedish Rally; 13 to 15 February 1975; Round 2 of the 1975 World Rally Championship	40 stages 800 km	1	Björn Waldegård; Hans Thorszelius	Lancia Stratos HF	7 h : 19 m : 46 s
25th International Swedish Rally; 13 to 15 February 1975; Round 2 of the 1975 World Rally Championship	40 stages 800 km	2	Stig Blomqvist; Hans Sylvan	Saab 96 V4	7 h : 21 m : 33 s
25th International Swedish Rally; 13 to 15 February 1975; Round 2 of the 1975 World Rally Championship	40 stages 800 km	3	Simo Lampinen; Sölve Andreasson	Lancia Beta Coupé	7 h : 31 m : 22 s
26th International Swedish Rally; 20 to 22 February 1976; Round 2 of the 1976 World Rally Championship	34 stages 722 km	1	Per Eklund; Björn Cederberg	Saab 96 V4	8 h : 8 m : 26 s
26th International Swedish Rally; 20 to 22 February 1976; Round 2 of the 1976 World Rally Championship	34 stages 722 km	2	Stig Blomqvist; Hans Sylvan	Saab 96 V4	8 h : 10 m : 2 s
26th International Swedish Rally; 20 to 22 February 1976; Round 2 of the 1976 World Rally Championship	34 stages 722 km	3	Anders Kulläng; Claes-Göran Andersson	Opel Ascona	8 h : 31 m : 10 s
27th International Swedish Rally; 11 to 13 February 1977; Round 2 of the 1977 World Rally Championship; Round 3 of the 1977 FIA Cup for Rally Drivers	472 km	1	Stig Blomqvist; Hans Sylvan	Saab 99 EMS	8 h : 2 m : 17 s
27th International Swedish Rally; 11 to 13 February 1977; Round 2 of the 1977 World Rally Championship; Round 3 of the 1977 FIA Cup for Rally Drivers	472 km	2	Bror Danielsson; Ulf Sundberg	Opel Kadett GT/E	8 h : 8 m : 19 s
27th International Swedish Rally; 11 to 13 February 1977; Round 2 of the 1977 World Rally Championship; Round 3 of the 1977 FIA Cup for Rally Drivers	472 km	3	Anders Kulläng; Bruno Berglund	Opel Kadett GT/E	8 h : 8 m : 32 s
28th International Swedish Rally; 10 to 12 February 1978; Round 2 of the 1978 World Rally Championship; Round 3 of the 1978 FIA Cup for Rally Drivers	39 stages 615 km	1	Björn Waldegård; Hans Thorszelius	Ford Escort RS1800	6 h : 42 m : 40 s
28th International Swedish Rally; 10 to 12 February 1978; Round 2 of the 1978 World Rally Championship; Round 3 of the 1978 FIA Cup for Rally Drivers	39 stages 615 km	2	Hannu Mikkola; Arne Hertz	Ford Escort RS1800	6 h : 44 m : 8 s
28th International Swedish Rally; 10 to 12 February 1978; Round 2 of the 1978 World Rally Championship; Round 3 of the 1978 FIA Cup for Rally Drivers	39 stages 615 km	3	Markku Alén; Ilkka Kivimäki	Fiat 131 Abarth	6 h : 45 m : 26 s
29th International Swedish Rally; 16 to 18 February 1979; Round 2 of the 1979 World Rally Championship	38 stages 630 km	1	Stig Blomqvist; Björn Cederberg	Saab 99 Turbo	6 h : 34 m : 49 s
29th International Swedish Rally; 16 to 18 February 1979; Round 2 of the 1979 World Rally Championship	38 stages 630 km	2	Björn Waldegård; Hans Thorszelius	Ford Escort RS1800	6 h : 36 m : 9 s
29th International Swedish Rally; 16 to 18 February 1979; Round 2 of the 1979 World Rally Championship	38 stages 630 km	3	Pentti Airikkala; Risto Virtanen	Vauxhall Chevette 2300 HS	6 h : 39 m : 31 s
30th International Swedish Rally; 15 to 17 February 1980; Round 2 of the 1980 World Rally Championship for Drivers	29 stages 414.5 km	1	Anders Kulläng; Bruno Berglund	Opel Euro Handler; Opel Ascona 400	4 h : 17 m : 52 s
30th International Swedish Rally; 15 to 17 February 1980; Round 2 of the 1980 World Rally Championship for Drivers	29 stages 414.5 km	2	Stig Blomqvist; Björn Cederberg	Saab Scania; Saab 99 Turbo	4 h : 19 m : 22 s
30th International Swedish Rally; 15 to 17 February 1980; Round 2 of the 1980 World Rally Championship for Drivers	29 stages 414.5 km	3	Björn Waldegård; Hans Thorszelius	Fiat Sweden; Fiat 131 Abarth	4 h : 21 m : 39 s
31st International Swedish Rally; 13 to 15 February 1981; Round 2 of the 1981 World Rally Championship for Drivers	stages km	1	Hannu Mikkola; Arne Hertz	Audi Sport; Audi Quattro	3 h : 48 m : 7 s
31st International Swedish Rally; 13 to 15 February 1981; Round 2 of the 1981 World Rally Championship for Drivers	stages km	2	Ari Vatanen; David Richards	Rothmans Rally Team; Ford Escort RS1800	3 h : 50 m : 0 s
31st International Swedish Rally; 13 to 15 February 1981; Round 2 of the 1981 World Rally Championship for Drivers	stages km	3	Pentti Airikkala; Risto Virtanen	Rothmans Rally Team; Ford Escort RS1800	3 h : 51 m : 47 s
32nd International Swedish Rally; 12 to 14 February 1982; Round 2 of the 1982 World Rally Championship for Drivers	25 stages 358 km	1	Stig Blomqvist; Björn Cederberg	Audi Sport Sweden; Audi Quattro	3 h : 40 m : 15 s
32nd International Swedish Rally; 12 to 14 February 1982; Round 2 of the 1982 World Rally Championship for Drivers	25 stages 358 km	2	Ari Vatanen; Terry Harryman	David Sutton Motorsport; Ford Escort RS1800	3 h : 42 m : 51 s
32nd International Swedish Rally; 12 to 14 February 1982; Round 2 of the 1982 World Rally Championship for Drivers	25 stages 358 km	3	Walter Röhrl; Christian Geistdörfer	Rothmans Opel Rally Team; Opel Ascona 400	3 h : 44 m : 29 s
33rd International Swedish Rally; 11 to 13 February 1983; Round 2 of the 1983 World Rally Championship for Drivers	24 stages 466 km	1	Hannu Mikkola; Arne Hertz	Audi Sport; Audi Quattro A1	4 h : 28 m : 47 s
33rd International Swedish Rally; 11 to 13 February 1983; Round 2 of the 1983 World Rally Championship for Drivers	24 stages 466 km	2	Stig Blomqvist; Björn Cederberg	Audi Sport; Audi 80 Quattro	4 h : 29 m : 34 s
33rd International Swedish Rally; 11 to 13 February 1983; Round 2 of the 1983 World Rally Championship for Drivers	24 stages 466 km	3	Lasse Lampi; Pentti Kuukkala	Privateer; Audi Quattro A1	4 h : 32 m : 51 s
34th International Swedish Rally; 10 to 12 February 1984; Round 2 of the 1984 World Rally Championship for Drivers	27 stages 450 km	1	Stig Blomqvist; Björn Cederberg	Audi Sport; Audi Quattro A2	4 h : 16 m : 45 s
34th International Swedish Rally; 10 to 12 February 1984; Round 2 of the 1984 World Rally Championship for Drivers	27 stages 450 km	2	Michèle Mouton; Fabrizia Pons	Audi Sport; Audi Quattro A2	4 h : 24 m : 12 s
34th International Swedish Rally; 10 to 12 February 1984; Round 2 of the 1984 World Rally Championship for Drivers	27 stages 450 km	3	Per Eklund; Dave Whittock	Clarion; Audi Quattro A2	4 h : 33 m : 27 s
35th International Swedish Rally; 15 to 17 February 1985; Round 2 of the 1985 World Rally Championship	29 stages 505 km	1	Ari Vatanen; Terry Harryman	Peugeot Talbot Sport; Peugeot 205 Turbo 16	4 h : 38 m : 49 s
35th International Swedish Rally; 15 to 17 February 1985; Round 2 of the 1985 World Rally Championship	29 stages 505 km	2	Stig Blomqvist; Björn Cederberg	Audi Sport; Audi Sport Quattro	4 h : 40 m : 38 s
35th International Swedish Rally; 15 to 17 February 1985; Round 2 of the 1985 World Rally Championship	29 stages 505 km	3	Timo Salonen; Seppo Harjanne	Peugeot Talbot Sport; Peugeot 205 Turbo 16	4 h : 42 m : 15 s

=== 1986 through 1999 ===
Rally name	Stages	Podium finishers			
Rally name	Stages	Rank	Driver Co-driver	Team Car	Time
36th International Swedish Rally; 14 to 16 February 1986; Round 2 of the 1986 World Rally Championship	30 stages 558 km	1	Juha Kankkunen; Juha Piironen	Peugeot Talbot Sport; Peugeot 205 Turbo 16 E2	5 h : 9 m : 19 s
36th International Swedish Rally; 14 to 16 February 1986; Round 2 of the 1986 World Rally Championship	30 stages 558 km	2	Markku Alén; Ilkka Kivimäki	Martini Lancia; Lancia Delta S4	5 h : 11 m : 13 s
36th International Swedish Rally; 14 to 16 February 1986; Round 2 of the 1986 World Rally Championship	30 stages 558 km	3	Kalle Grundel; Benny Melander	Ford Motor Company; Ford RS200	5 h : 15 m : 35 s
37th International Swedish Rally; 13 to 14 February 1987; Round 2 of the 1987 World Rally Championship	26 stages 400.39 km	1	Timo Salonen; Seppo Harjanne	Mazda Rally Team Europe; Mazda 323 4WD	4 h : 11 m : 0 s
37th International Swedish Rally; 13 to 14 February 1987; Round 2 of the 1987 World Rally Championship	26 stages 400.39 km	2	Mikael Ericsson; Claes Billstam	Martini Lancia; Lancia Delta HF 4WD	4 h : 11 m : 23 s
37th International Swedish Rally; 13 to 14 February 1987; Round 2 of the 1987 World Rally Championship	26 stages 400.39 km	3	Juha Kankkunen; Juha Piironen	Martini Lancia; Lancia Delta HF 4WD	4 h : 12 m : 46 s
38th International Swedish Rally; 4 to 6 February 1988; Round 2 of the 1988 World Rally Championship	35 stages 491.96 km	1	Markku Alén; Ilkka Kivimäki	Martini Lancia; Lancia Delta HF 4WD	5 h : 2 m : 31 s
38th International Swedish Rally; 4 to 6 February 1988; Round 2 of the 1988 World Rally Championship	35 stages 491.96 km	2	Stig Blomqvist; Benny Melander	Rallysport Sweden; Ford Sierra XR 4x4	5 h : 4 m : 8 s
38th International Swedish Rally; 4 to 6 February 1988; Round 2 of the 1988 World Rally Championship	35 stages 491.96 km	3	Lars-Erik Torph; Tina Thörner	Privateer; Audi Coupé Quattro	5 h : 10 m : 3 s
39th International Swedish Rally; 6 to 8 January 1989; Round 1 of the 1989 World Rally Championship for Drivers	37 stages 504.47 km	1	Ingvar Carlsson; Per Carlsson	Mazda Rally Team Europe; Mazda 323 4WD	4 h : 58 m : 15 s
39th International Swedish Rally; 6 to 8 January 1989; Round 1 of the 1989 World Rally Championship for Drivers	37 stages 504.47 km	2	Per Eklund; Dave Whittock	Clarion Team Europe; Lancia Delta Integrale	4 h : 59 m : 18 s
39th International Swedish Rally; 6 to 8 January 1989; Round 1 of the 1989 World Rally Championship for Drivers	37 stages 504.47 km	3	Kenneth Eriksson; Staffan Parmander	Toyota Team Sweden; Toyota Celica GT-Four ST165	4 h : 59 m : 57 s
40th International Swedish Rally; 16 to 18 February 1991; Round 2 of the 1991 World Rally Championship for Drivers	29 stages 520.01 km	1	Kenneth Eriksson; Staffan Parmander	Mitsubishi Ralliart Europe; Mitsubishi Galant VR-4	4 h : 56 m : 16 s
40th International Swedish Rally; 16 to 18 February 1991; Round 2 of the 1991 World Rally Championship for Drivers	29 stages 520.01 km	2	Mats Jonsson; Lars Backman	Toyota Team Europe; Toyota Celica GT-Four ST165	4 h : 56 m : 36 s
40th International Swedish Rally; 16 to 18 February 1991; Round 2 of the 1991 World Rally Championship for Drivers	29 stages 520.01 km	3	Markku Alén; Ilkka Kivimäki	Subaru Rally Team Europe; Subaru Legacy RS	4 h : 57 m : 20 s
41st International Swedish Rally to February 1992; Round 2 of the 1992 World Rally Championship for Drivers	stages km	1	Mats Jonsson; Lars Backman	Toyota Team Sweden; Toyota Celica GT-Four ST165	5 h : 24 m : 37 s
41st International Swedish Rally to February 1992; Round 2 of the 1992 World Rally Championship for Drivers	stages km	2	Colin McRae; Derek Ringer	Subaru Rally Team Europe; Subaru Legacy RS	5 h : 25 m : 16 s
41st International Swedish Rally to February 1992; Round 2 of the 1992 World Rally Championship for Drivers	stages km	3	Stig Blomqvist; Benny Melander	Nissan Motorsport; Nissan Sunny GTI-R	5 h : 26 m : 9 s
42nd International Swedish Rally; 12 to 14 February 1993; Round 2 of the 1993 World Rally Championship	28 stages 519.63 km	1	Mats Jonsson; Lars Backman	Toyota Castrol Team; Toyota Celica Turbo 4WD	4 h : 49 m : 5 s
42nd International Swedish Rally; 12 to 14 February 1993; Round 2 of the 1993 World Rally Championship	28 stages 519.63 km	2	Juha Kankkunen; Juha Piironen	Toyota Castrol Team; Toyota Celica Turbo 4WD	4 h : 49 m : 18 s
42nd International Swedish Rally; 12 to 14 February 1993; Round 2 of the 1993 World Rally Championship	28 stages 519.63 km	3	Colin McRae; Derek Ringer	555 Subaru World Rally Team; Subaru Legacy RS	4 h : 49 m : 33 s
43rd International Swedish Rally; 4 to 6 February 1994; Round 2 of the 1994 FIA 2-Litre World Rally Cup for Manufacturers	24 stages 431 km	1	Thomas Rådström; Lars Bäckman	Toyota Celica Turbo 4WD	4 h : 12 m : 0 s
43rd International Swedish Rally; 4 to 6 February 1994; Round 2 of the 1994 FIA 2-Litre World Rally Cup for Manufacturers	24 stages 431 km	2	Mats Jonsson; Johnny Johansson	Mazda 323 RTR	4 h : 12 m : 12 s
43rd International Swedish Rally; 4 to 6 February 1994; Round 2 of the 1994 FIA 2-Litre World Rally Cup for Manufacturers	24 stages 431 km	3	Stig Blomqvist; Benny Melander	Ford Escort RS Cosworth	4 h : 12 m : 16 s
44th International Swedish Rally; 10 to 12 February 1995; Round 2 of the 1995 World Rally Championship; Round 2 of the 1995 FIA 2-Litre World Rally Cup for Manufacturers	25 stages 501 km	1	Kenneth Eriksson; Staffan Parmander	Team Mitsubishi Ralliart; Mitsubishi Lancer Evolution II	4 h : 51 m : 27 s
44th International Swedish Rally; 10 to 12 February 1995; Round 2 of the 1995 World Rally Championship; Round 2 of the 1995 FIA 2-Litre World Rally Cup for Manufacturers	25 stages 501 km	2	Tommi Mäkinen; Seppo Harjanne	Team Mitsubishi Ralliart; Mitsubishi Lancer Evolution II	4 h : 51 m : 39 s
44th International Swedish Rally; 10 to 12 February 1995; Round 2 of the 1995 World Rally Championship; Round 2 of the 1995 FIA 2-Litre World Rally Cup for Manufacturers	25 stages 501 km	3	Thomas Rådström; Lars Bäckman	Toyota Castrol Team; Toyota Celica GT-Four ST205	4 h : 52 m : 34 s
45th International Swedish Rally; 9 to 11 February 1996; Round 2 of the 1996 World Rally Championship	27 stages 490.64 km	1	Tommi Mäkinen; Seppo Harjanne	Team Mitsubishi Ralliart; Mitsubishi Lancer Evolution III	4 h : 37 m : 10 s
45th International Swedish Rally; 9 to 11 February 1996; Round 2 of the 1996 World Rally Championship	27 stages 490.64 km	2	Carlos Sainz; Luis Moya	Ford Motor Company; Ford Escort RS Cosworth	4 h : 37 m : 33 s
45th International Swedish Rally; 9 to 11 February 1996; Round 2 of the 1996 World Rally Championship	27 stages 490.64 km	3	Colin McRae; Derek Ringer	555 Subaru World Rally Team; Subaru Impreza 555	4 h : 38 m : 15 s
46th International Swedish Rally; 7 to 10 February 1997; Round 2 of the 1997 World Rally Championship	24 stages 413.45 km	1	Kenneth Eriksson; Staffan Parmander	555 Subaru World Rally Team; Subaru Impreza WRC 97	3 h : 51 m : 49 s
46th International Swedish Rally; 7 to 10 February 1997; Round 2 of the 1997 World Rally Championship	24 stages 413.45 km	2	Carlos Sainz; Luis Moya	Ford Motor Company; Ford Escort WRC	3 h : 52 m : 5 s
46th International Swedish Rally; 7 to 10 February 1997; Round 2 of the 1997 World Rally Championship	24 stages 413.45 km	3	Tommi Mäkinen; Seppo Harjanne	Team Mitsubishi Ralliart; Mitsubishi Lancer Evolution IV	3 h : 52 m : 15 s
47th International Swedish Rally; 6 to 8 February 1998; Round 2 of the 1998 World Rally Championship	19 stages 381.34 km	1	Tommi Mäkinen; Risto Mannisenmäki	Team Mitsubishi Ralliart; Mitsubishi Lancer Evolution IV	3 h : 32 m : 51.6 s
47th International Swedish Rally; 6 to 8 February 1998; Round 2 of the 1998 World Rally Championship	19 stages 381.34 km	2	Carlos Sainz; Luis Moya	Toyota Castrol Team; Toyota Corolla WRC	3 h : 33 m : 43.2 s
47th International Swedish Rally; 6 to 8 February 1998; Round 2 of the 1998 World Rally Championship	19 stages 381.34 km	3	Juha Kankkunen; Juha Repo	Ford Motor Company; Ford Escort WRC	3 h : 33 m : 50.4 s
48th International Swedish Rally; 12 to 14 February 1999; Round 2 of the 1999 World Rally Championship	19 stages 384.3 km	1	Tommi Mäkinen; Risto Mannisenmäki	Marlboro Mitsubishi Ralliart; Mitsubishi Lancer Evolution VI	3 h : 29 m : 15.6 s
48th International Swedish Rally; 12 to 14 February 1999; Round 2 of the 1999 World Rally Championship	19 stages 384.3 km	2	Carlos Sainz; Luis Moya	Toyota Castrol Team; Toyota Corolla WRC	3 h : 29 m : 33.7 s
48th International Swedish Rally; 12 to 14 February 1999; Round 2 of the 1999 World Rally Championship	19 stages 384.3 km	3	Thomas Rådström; Fred Gallagher	Ford Motor Company; Ford Focus WRC	3 h : 29 m : 53.4 s

=== 2000 — Present ===
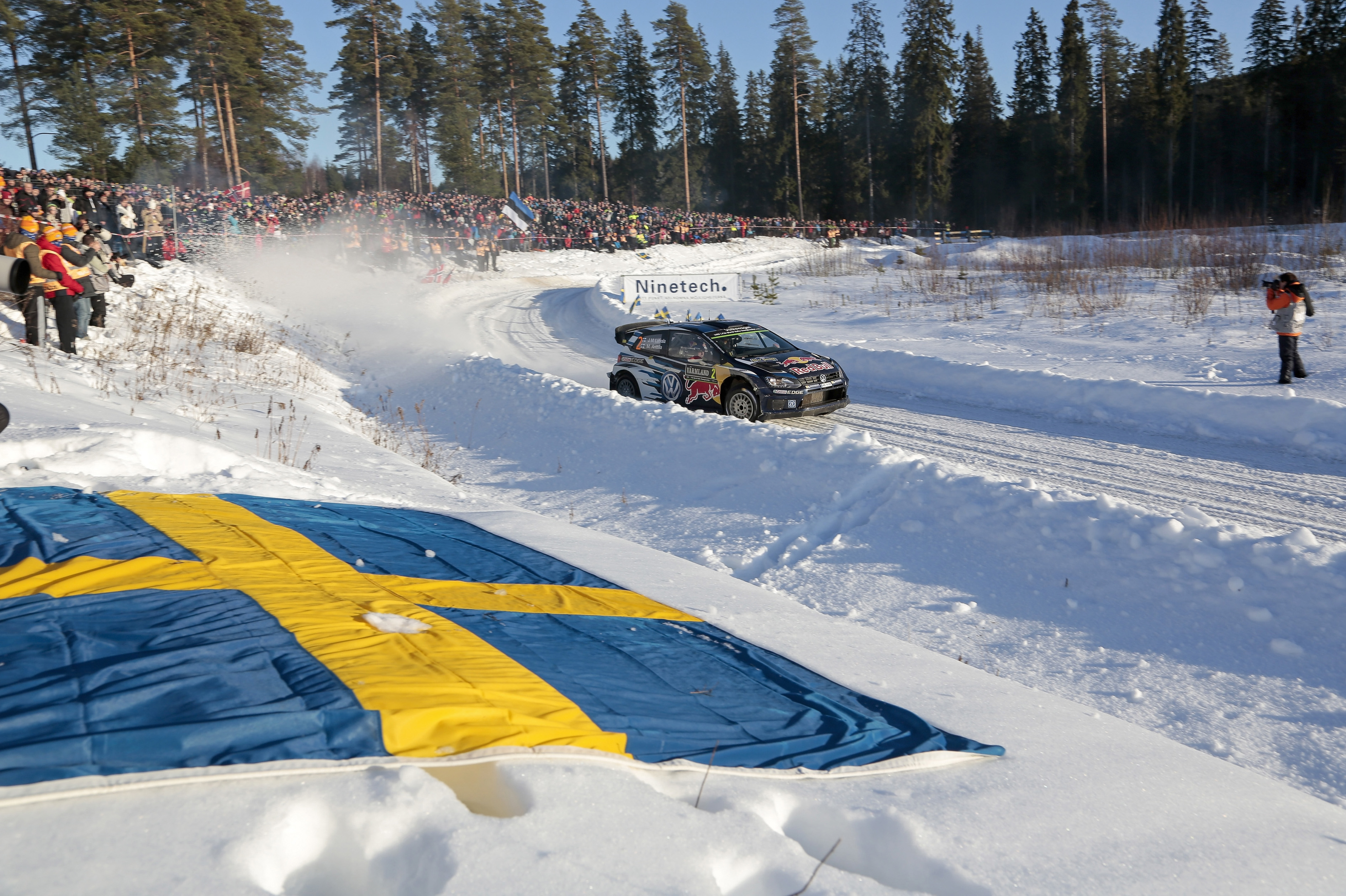
Jari-Matti Latvala at the 2015 Rally

Rally name	Stages	Podium finishers			
Rally name	Stages	Rank	Driver Co-driver	Team Car	Time
49th International Swedish Rally; 11 to 13 February 2000; Round 2 of the 2000 World Rally Championship	19 stages 377.89 km	1	Marcus Grönholm; Timo Rautiainen	Peugeot Esso; Peugeot 206 WRC	3 h : 20 m : 33.3 s
49th International Swedish Rally; 11 to 13 February 2000; Round 2 of the 2000 World Rally Championship	19 stages 377.89 km	2	Tommi Mäkinen; Risto Mannisenmäki	Marlboro Mitsubishi Ralliart; Mitsubishi Lancer Evolution VI	3 h : 20 m : 40.1 s
49th International Swedish Rally; 11 to 13 February 2000; Round 2 of the 2000 World Rally Championship	19 stages 377.89 km	3	Colin McRae; Nicky Grist	Ford Motor Company; Ford Focus RS WRC 00	3 h : 20 m : 47.0 s
50th International Swedish Rally; 9 to 11 February 2001; Round 2 of the 2001 World Rally Championship	17 stages 379.87 km	1	Harri Rovanperä; Risto Pietiläinen	Peugeot Total; Peugeot 206 WRC	3 h : 27 m : 1.1 s
50th International Swedish Rally; 9 to 11 February 2001; Round 2 of the 2001 World Rally Championship	17 stages 379.87 km	2	Thomas Rådström; Tina Thörner	Marlboro Mitsubishi Ralliart; Mitsubishi Carisma GT Evolution VI	3 h : 27 m : 29.0 s
50th International Swedish Rally; 9 to 11 February 2001; Round 2 of the 2001 World Rally Championship	17 stages 379.87 km	3	Carlos Sainz; Luis Moya	Ford Motor Company; Ford Focus RS WRC 01	3 h : 27 m : 38.1 s
51st Uddeholm Swedish Rally; 1 to 3 February 2002; Round 2 of the 2002 World Rally Championship	16 stages 383.58 km	1	Marcus Grönholm; Timo Rautiainen	Peugeot Total; Peugeot 206 WRC	3 h : 7 m : 28.6 s
51st Uddeholm Swedish Rally; 1 to 3 February 2002; Round 2 of the 2002 World Rally Championship	16 stages 383.58 km	2	Harri Rovanperä; Risto Pietiläinen	Peugeot Total; Peugeot 206 WRC	3 h : 8 m : 53.1 s
51st Uddeholm Swedish Rally; 1 to 3 February 2002; Round 2 of the 2002 World Rally Championship	16 stages 383.58 km	3	Carlos Sainz; Luis Moya	Ford Motor Company; Ford Focus RS WRC 02	3 h : 9 m : 54.4 s
52nd Uddeholm Swedish Rally; 6 to 9 February 2003; Round 2 of the 2003 World Rally Championship	17 stages 386.91 km	1	Marcus Grönholm; Timo Rautiainen	Marlboro Peugeot Total; Peugeot 206 WRC	3 h : 3 m : 28.1 s
52nd Uddeholm Swedish Rally; 6 to 9 February 2003; Round 2 of the 2003 World Rally Championship	17 stages 386.91 km	2	Tommi Mäkinen; Kaj Lindström	555 Subaru World Rally Team; Subaru Impreza WRC 2003	3 h : 4 m : 18.9 s
52nd Uddeholm Swedish Rally; 6 to 9 February 2003; Round 2 of the 2003 World Rally Championship	17 stages 386.91 km	3	Richard Burns; Robert Reid	Marlboro Peugeot Total; Peugeot 206 WRC	3 h : 4 m : 46.0 s
53rd Uddeholm Swedish Rally; 6 to 8 February 2004; Round 2 of the 2004 World Rally Championship	19 stages 394.8 km	1	Sébastien Loeb; Daniel Elena	Citroën Total; Citroën Xsara WRC	3 h : 26 m : 17.7 s
53rd Uddeholm Swedish Rally; 6 to 8 February 2004; Round 2 of the 2004 World Rally Championship	19 stages 394.8 km	2	Marcus Grönholm; Timo Rautiainen	Marlboro Peugeot Total; Peugeot 307 WRC	3 h : 27 m : 4.1 s
53rd Uddeholm Swedish Rally; 6 to 8 February 2004; Round 2 of the 2004 World Rally Championship	19 stages 394.8 km	3	Petter Solberg; Phil Mills	555 Subaru World Rally Team; Subaru Impreza WRC 2003	3 h : 27 m : 39.2 s
54th Uddeholm Swedish Rally; 11 to 13 February 2005; Round 2 of the 2005 World Rally Championship	20 stages 359.87 km	1	Petter Solberg; Phil Mills	Subaru World Rally Team; Subaru Impreza WRC 2004	3 h : 0 m : 52.1 s
54th Uddeholm Swedish Rally; 11 to 13 February 2005; Round 2 of the 2005 World Rally Championship	20 stages 359.87 km	2	Markko Märtin; Michael Park	Marlboro Peugeot Total; Peugeot 307 WRC	3 h : 3 m : 3.2 s
54th Uddeholm Swedish Rally; 11 to 13 February 2005; Round 2 of the 2005 World Rally Championship	20 stages 359.87 km	3	Toni Gardemeister; Jakke Honkanen	BP Ford World Rally Team; Ford Focus RS WRC 04	3 h : 4 m : 6.8 s
55th Uddeholm Swedish Rally; 3 to 5 February 2006; Round 2 of the 2006 World Rally Championship	19 stages 349.02 km	1	Marcus Grönholm; Timo Rautiainen	BP Ford World Rally Team; Ford Focus RS WRC 06	3 h : 9 m : 1.9 s
55th Uddeholm Swedish Rally; 3 to 5 February 2006; Round 2 of the 2006 World Rally Championship	19 stages 349.02 km	2	Sébastien Loeb; Daniel Elena	Kronos Total Citroën World Rally Team; Citroën Xsara WRC	3 h : 9 m : 32.8 s
55th Uddeholm Swedish Rally; 3 to 5 February 2006; Round 2 of the 2006 World Rally Championship	19 stages 349.02 km	3	Daniel Carlsson; Bosse Holmstrand	Privateer; Mitsubishi Lancer WRC05	3 h : 11 m : 58.7 s
56th Uddeholm Swedish Rally; 9 to 11 February 2007; Round 2 of the 2007 World Rally Championship	20 stages 341.2 km	1	Marcus Grönholm; Timo Rautiainen	BP Ford World Rally Team; Ford Focus RS WRC 06	3 h : 8 m : 40.7 s
56th Uddeholm Swedish Rally; 9 to 11 February 2007; Round 2 of the 2007 World Rally Championship	20 stages 341.2 km	2	Sébastien Loeb; Daniel Elena	Citroën Total World Rally Team; Citroën C4 WRC	3 h : 9 m : 34.5 s
56th Uddeholm Swedish Rally; 9 to 11 February 2007; Round 2 of the 2007 World Rally Championship	20 stages 341.2 km	3	Mikko Hirvonen; Jarmo Lehtinen	BP Ford World Rally Team; Ford Focus RS WRC 06	3 h : 10 m : 22.2 s
57th Uddeholm Swedish Rally; 7 to 10 February 2008; Round 2 of the 2008 World Rally Championship	20 stages 340.24 km	1	Jari-Matti Latvala; Miikka Anttila	BP-Ford Abu Dhabi World Rally Team; Ford Focus RS WRC 07	2 h : 46 m : 41.2 s
57th Uddeholm Swedish Rally; 7 to 10 February 2008; Round 2 of the 2008 World Rally Championship	20 stages 340.24 km	2	Mikko Hirvonen; Jarmo Lehtinen	BP-Ford Abu Dhabi World Rally Team; Ford Focus RS WRC 07	2 h : 47 m : 39.5 s
57th Uddeholm Swedish Rally; 7 to 10 February 2008; Round 2 of the 2008 World Rally Championship	20 stages 340.24 km	3	Gigi Galli; Giovanni Bernacchini	Stobart M-Sport Ford Rally Team; Ford Focus RS WRC 07	2 h : 49 m : 04.4 s
58th Rally Sweden; 11 to 14 February 2010; Round 1 of the 2010 World Rally Championship	21 stages 345.15 km	1	Mikko Hirvonen; Jarmo Lehtinen	BP-Ford Abu Dhabi World Rally Team; Ford Focus RS WRC 09	3 h : 09 m : 30.4 s
58th Rally Sweden; 11 to 14 February 2010; Round 1 of the 2010 World Rally Championship	21 stages 345.15 km	2	Sébastien Loeb; Daniel Elena	Citroën Total World Rally Team; Citroën C4 WRC	3 h : 10 m : 12.7 s
58th Rally Sweden; 11 to 14 February 2010; Round 1 of the 2010 World Rally Championship	21 stages 345.15 km	3	Jari-Matti Latvala; Miikka Anttila	BP-Ford Abu Dhabi World Rally Team; Ford Focus RS WRC 09	3 h : 10 m : 45.8 s
59th Rally Sweden; 10 to 13 February 2011; Round 1 of the 2011 World Rally Championship	22 stages 351.00 km	1	Mikko Hirvonen; Jarmo Lehtinen	Ford Abu Dhabi World Rally Team; Ford Fiesta RS WRC	3 h : 23 m : 56.6 s
59th Rally Sweden; 10 to 13 February 2011; Round 1 of the 2011 World Rally Championship	22 stages 351.00 km	2	Mads Østberg; Jonas Andersson	M-Sport Stobart Ford World Rally Team; Ford Fiesta RS WRC	3 h : 24 m : 03.1 s
59th Rally Sweden; 10 to 13 February 2011; Round 1 of the 2011 World Rally Championship	22 stages 351.00 km	3	Jari-Matti Latvala; Miikka Anttila	Ford Abu Dhabi World Rally Team; Ford Fiesta RS WRC	3 h : 24 m : 30.6 s
60th Rally Sweden; 9 to 12 February 2012; Round 2 of the 2012 World Rally Championship	24 stages 349.16 km	1	Jari-Matti Latvala; Miikka Anttila	Ford World Rally Team; Ford Fiesta RS WRC	3 h : 18 m : 28.3 s
60th Rally Sweden; 9 to 12 February 2012; Round 2 of the 2012 World Rally Championship	24 stages 349.16 km	2	Mikko Hirvonen; Jarmo Lehtinen	Citroën Total World Rally Team; Citroën DS3 WRC	3 h : 18 m : 44.9 s
60th Rally Sweden; 9 to 12 February 2012; Round 2 of the 2012 World Rally Championship	24 stages 349.16 km	3	Mads Østberg; Jonas Andersson	Mads Østberg; Ford Fiesta RS WRC	3 h : 19 m : 07.1 s
61st Rally Sweden; 7 to 10 February 2013; Round 2 of the 2013 World Rally Championship	22 stages 337.91 km	1	Sébastien Ogier; Julien Ingrassia	Volkswagen Motorsport; Volkswagen Polo R WRC	3 h : 11 m : 41.9 s
61st Rally Sweden; 7 to 10 February 2013; Round 2 of the 2013 World Rally Championship	22 stages 337.91 km	2	Sébastien Loeb; Daniel Elena	Citroën Total Abu Dhabi World Rally Team; Citroën DS3 WRC	3 h : 12 m : 23.7 s
61st Rally Sweden; 7 to 10 February 2013; Round 2 of the 2013 World Rally Championship	22 stages 337.91 km	3	Mads Østberg; Jonas Andersson	Qatar M-Sport World Rally Team; Ford Fiesta RS WRC	3 h : 13 m : 06.4 s
62nd Rally Sweden; 5 to 8 February 2014; Round 2 of the 2014 World Rally Championship	24 stages 328.4 km	1	Jari-Matti Latvala; Miikka Anttila	Volkswagen Motorsport; Volkswagen Polo R WRC	3 h : 00 m : 31.1 s
62nd Rally Sweden; 5 to 8 February 2014; Round 2 of the 2014 World Rally Championship	24 stages 328.4 km	2	Andreas Mikkelsen; Mikko Markkula	Volkswagen Motorsport II; Volkswagen Polo R WRC	3 h : 01 m : 24.7 s
62nd Rally Sweden; 5 to 8 February 2014; Round 2 of the 2014 World Rally Championship	24 stages 328.4 km	3	Mads Østberg; Jonas Andersson	Citroën Total Abu Dhabi World Rally Team; Citroën DS3 WRC	3 h : 01 m : 30.6 s
63rd Rally Sweden; 12 to 15 February 2015; Round 2 of the 2015 World Rally Championship	21 stages 308.0 km	1	Sébastien Ogier; Julien Ingrassia	Volkswagen Motorsport; Volkswagen Polo R WRC	2 h : 55 m : 30.5 s
63rd Rally Sweden; 12 to 15 February 2015; Round 2 of the 2015 World Rally Championship	21 stages 308.0 km	2	Thierry Neuville; Nicolas Gilsoul	Hyundai Motorsport; Hyundai i20 WRC	2 h : 55 m : 36.9 s
63rd Rally Sweden; 12 to 15 February 2015; Round 2 of the 2015 World Rally Championship	21 stages 308.0 km	3	Andreas Mikkelsen; Ola Fløene	Volkswagen Motorsport II; Volkswagen Polo R WRC	2 h : 56 m : 10.3 s
64th Rally Sweden; 12 to 14 February 2016; Round 2 of the 2016 World Rally Championship	~~21~~ 12 stages ~~331.13~~ 226.48 km	1	Sébastien Ogier; Julien Ingrassia	Volkswagen Motorsport; Volkswagen Polo R WRC	1 h : 59 m : 47.4 s
64th Rally Sweden; 12 to 14 February 2016; Round 2 of the 2016 World Rally Championship	~~21~~ 12 stages ~~331.13~~ 226.48 km	2	Hayden Paddon; John Kennard	Hyundai Motorsport; Hyundai i20 WRC	2 h : 00 m : 17.2 s
64th Rally Sweden; 12 to 14 February 2016; Round 2 of the 2016 World Rally Championship	~~21~~ 12 stages ~~331.13~~ 226.48 km	3	Mads Østberg; Ola Fløene	M-Sport World Rally Team; Ford Fiesta RS WRC	2 h : 00 m : 43.0 s
65th Rally Sweden; 9 to 12 February 2017; Round 2 of the 2017 World Rally Championship	12 stages 305.83 km	1	Jari-Matti Latvala; Miikka Anttila	Toyota Gazoo Racing WRT; Toyota Yaris WRC	2 h : 36 m : 03.6 s
65th Rally Sweden; 9 to 12 February 2017; Round 2 of the 2017 World Rally Championship	12 stages 305.83 km	2	Ott Tänak; Martin Järveoja	M-Sport World Rally Team; Ford Fiesta WRC	2 h : 36 m : 32.8 s
65th Rally Sweden; 9 to 12 February 2017; Round 2 of the 2017 World Rally Championship	12 stages 305.83 km	3	Sébastien Ogier; Julien Ingrassia	M-Sport World Rally Team; Ford Fiesta WRC	2 h : 37 m : 03.1 s
66th Rally Sweden; 15 to 18 February 2018; Round 2 of the 2018 World Rally Championship	19 stages 314.25 km	1	Thierry Neuville; Nicolas Gilsoul	Hyundai Shell Mobis WRT; Hyundai i20 Coupe WRC	2 h : 52 m : 13.1 s
66th Rally Sweden; 15 to 18 February 2018; Round 2 of the 2018 World Rally Championship	19 stages 314.25 km	2	Craig Breen; Scott Martin	Citroën Total Abu Dhabi WRT; Citroën C3 WRC	2 h : 52 m : 32.9 s
66th Rally Sweden; 15 to 18 February 2018; Round 2 of the 2018 World Rally Championship	19 stages 314.25 km	3	Andreas Mikkelsen; Anders Jæger	Hyundai Shell Mobis WRT; Hyundai i20 Coupe WRC	2 h : 52 m : 41.4 s
67th Rally Sweden; 14 to 17 February 2019; Round 2 of the 2019 World Rally Championship	19 stages 316.80 km	1	Ott Tänak; Martin Järveoja	Toyota Gazoo Racing WRT; Toyota Yaris WRC	2 h : 47 m : 30.0 s
67th Rally Sweden; 14 to 17 February 2019; Round 2 of the 2019 World Rally Championship	19 stages 316.80 km	2	Esapekka Lappi; Janne Ferm	Citroën Total WRT; Citroën C3 WRC	2 h : 48 m : 23.7 s
67th Rally Sweden; 14 to 17 February 2019; Round 2 of the 2019 World Rally Championship	19 stages 316.80 km	3	Thierry Neuville; Nicolas Gilsoul	Hyundai Shell Mobis WRT; Hyundai i20 Coupe WRC	2 h : 48 m : 26.7 s
68th Rally Sweden; 13 to 16 February 2020; Round 2 of the 2020 World Rally Championship	9 stages 105.47 km	1	Elfyn Evans; Scott Martin	Toyota Gazoo Racing WRT; Toyota Yaris WRC	1 h : 11 m : 43.1 s
68th Rally Sweden; 13 to 16 February 2020; Round 2 of the 2020 World Rally Championship	9 stages 105.47 km	2	Ott Tänak; Martin Järveoja	Shell Mobis WRT; Hyundai i20 Coupe WRC	1 h : 11 m : 55.8 s
68th Rally Sweden; 13 to 16 February 2020; Round 2 of the 2020 World Rally Championship	9 stages 105.47 km	3	Kalle Rovanperä; Jonne Halttunen	Toyota Gazoo Racing WRT; Toyota Yaris WRC	1 h : 12 m : 3.3 s
69th Rally Sweden; 24 to 27 February 2022; Round 2 of the 2022 World Rally Championship	17 stages 264.81 km	1	Kalle Rovanperä; Jonne Halttunen	Toyota Gazoo Racing WRT; Toyota GR Yaris Rally1	2 h : 10 m : 44.9 s
69th Rally Sweden; 24 to 27 February 2022; Round 2 of the 2022 World Rally Championship	17 stages 264.81 km	2	Thierry Neuville; Martijn Wydaeghe	Hyundai Shell Mobis WRT; Hyundai i20 N Rally1	2 h : 11 m : 06.9 s
69th Rally Sweden; 24 to 27 February 2022; Round 2 of the 2022 World Rally Championship	17 stages 264.81 km	3	Esapekka Lappi; Janne Ferm	Toyota Gazoo Racing WRT; Toyota GR Yaris Rally1	2 h : 11 m : 15.5 s
70th Rally Sweden; 9 to 12 February 2023; Round 2 of the 2023 World Rally Championship	18 stages 301.18 km	1	Ott Tänak; Martin Järveoja	M-Sport World Rally Team; Ford Puma Rally1	2 h : 25 m : 54.5 s
70th Rally Sweden; 9 to 12 February 2023; Round 2 of the 2023 World Rally Championship	18 stages 301.18 km	2	Craig Breen; James Fulton	Hyundai Shell Mobis WRT; Hyundai i20 N Rally1	2 h : 26 m : 13.2 s
70th Rally Sweden; 9 to 12 February 2023; Round 2 of the 2023 World Rally Championship	18 stages 301.18 km	3	Thierry Neuville; Martijn Wydaeghe	Hyundai Shell Mobis WRT; Hyundai i20 N Rally1	2 h : 26 m : 14.5 s
71st Rally Sweden; 15 to 18 February 2024; Round 2 of the 2024 World Rally Championship	18 stages 300.10 km	1	Esapekka Lappi; Janne Ferm	Hyundai Shell Mobis WRT; Hyundai i20 N Rally1	2 h : 33 m : 04.9 s
71st Rally Sweden; 15 to 18 February 2024; Round 2 of the 2024 World Rally Championship	18 stages 300.10 km	2	Elfyn Evans; Scott Martin	Toyota Gazoo Racing WRT; Toyota GR Yaris Rally1	2 h : 33 m : 34.5 s
71st Rally Sweden; 15 to 18 February 2024; Round 2 of the 2024 World Rally Championship	18 stages 300.10 km	3	Adrien Fourmaux; Alexandre Coria	M-Sport World Rally Team; Ford Puma Rally1	2 h : 33 m : 52.8 s
72nd Rally Sweden; 13 to 16 February 2025; Round 2 of the 2025 World Rally Championship	18 stages 293.84 km	1	Elfyn Evans; Scott Martin	Toyota Gazoo Racing WRT; Toyota GR Yaris Rally1	2 h : 33 m : 39.2 s
72nd Rally Sweden; 13 to 16 February 2025; Round 2 of the 2025 World Rally Championship	18 stages 293.84 km	2	Takamoto Katsuta; Aaron Johnston	Toyota Gazoo Racing WRT; Toyota GR Yaris Rally1	2 h : 33 m : 43.0 s
72nd Rally Sweden; 13 to 16 February 2025; Round 2 of the 2025 World Rally Championship	18 stages 293.84 km	3	Thierry Neuville; Martijn Wydaeghe	Hyundai Shell Mobis WRT; Hyundai i20 N Rally1	2 h : 33 m : 51.1 s
73rd Rally Sweden; 12 to 15 February 2026; Round 2 of the 2026 World Rally Championship	18 stages 300.66 km	1	Elfyn Evans; Scott Martin	Toyota Gazoo Racing WRT; Toyota GR Yaris Rally1	2 h : 35 m : 53.1 s
73rd Rally Sweden; 12 to 15 February 2026; Round 2 of the 2026 World Rally Championship	18 stages 300.66 km	2	Takamoto Katsuta; Aaron Johnston	Toyota Gazoo Racing WRT; Toyota GR Yaris Rally1	2 h : 36 m : 07.4 s
73rd Rally Sweden; 12 to 15 February 2026; Round 2 of the 2026 World Rally Championship	18 stages 300.66 km	3	Sami Pajari; Marko Salminen	Toyota Gazoo Racing WRT2; Toyota GR Yaris Rally1	2 h : 36 m : 39.1 s

=== Multiple winners ===
Wins	Drivers
7	Stig Blomqvist
5	Marcus Grönholm, Björn Waldegård
4	Jari-Matti Latvala
3	Kenneth Eriksson, Tommi Mäkinen, Sébastien Ogier, Elfyn Evans
2	Arne Hertz, Mats Jonsson, Carl-Magnus Skogh, Bengt Söderström, Tom Trana, Mikko Hirvonen, Hannu Mikkola, Ott Tänak

Wins	Manufacturers
10	Saab
9	Ford
8	Porsche
8	Toyota
6	Peugeot
5	Mitsubishi
4
4	Audi, Volkswagen, Volvo
2	Lancia, Mazda, Subaru, Hyundai

== See also ==
- Colin's Crest
