= Anders Kulläng =

Swedish rally driver (1943–2012)

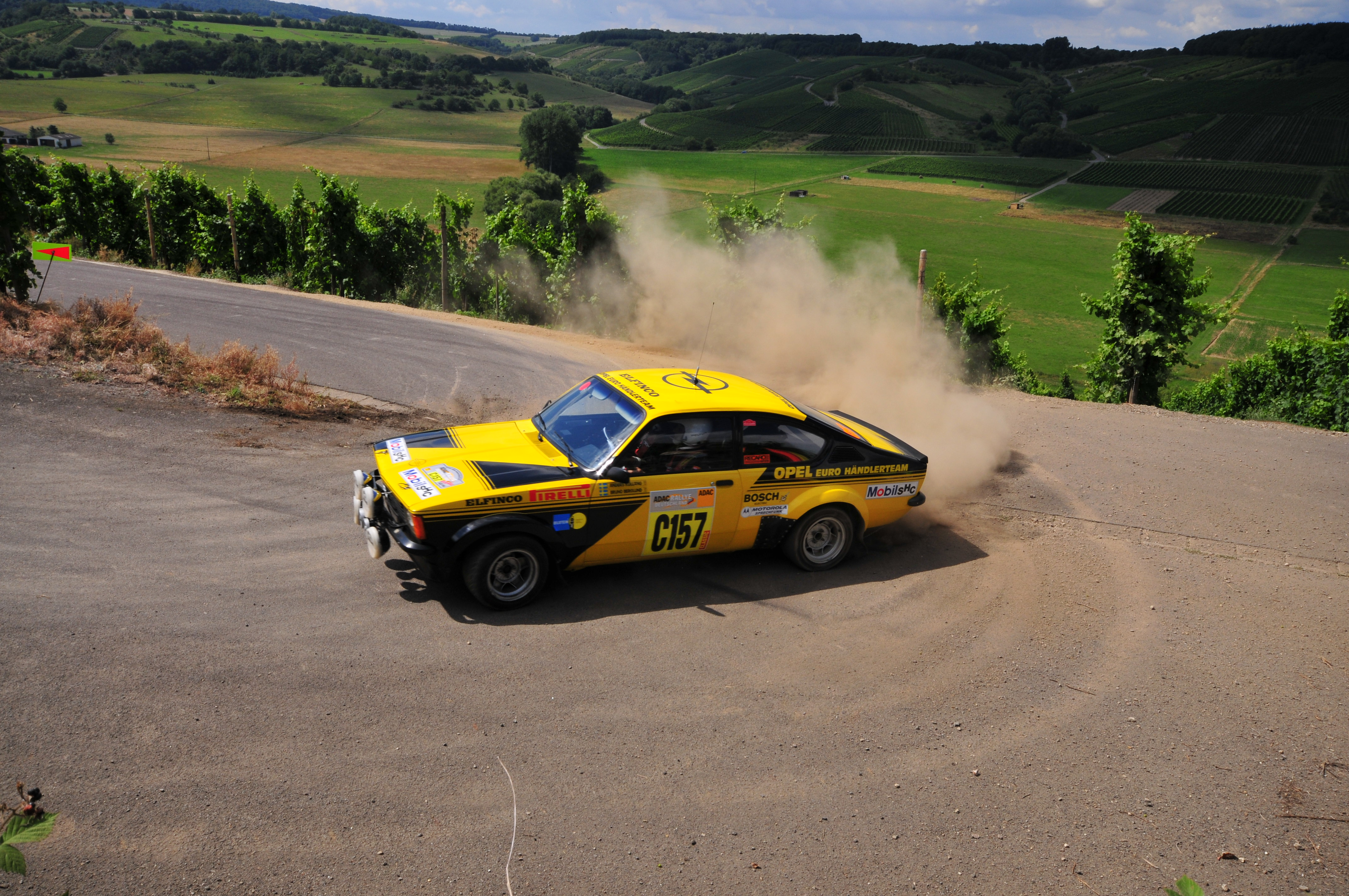

Personal information
- Nationality: (Sweden) Swedish
- Born: 23 September 1943; Karlstad, Sweden
- Died: 28 February 2012 (aged 68); Huay Yang, Thailand

World Rally Championship record
- Years active: 1973–1982, 1984, 1988
- Co-driver: (Sweden) Claes-Göran Andersson (Sweden) Donald Karlsson (Sweden) Bruno Berglund (Netherlands) Bob de Jong (Sweden) Lars-Ove Larsson (Sweden) Jörgan Skallman
- Teams: Opel, Mitsubishi, Volvo
- Rallies: 45
- Championships: 0
- Rally wins: 1
- Podiums: 4
- Stage wins: 57
- Total points: 74
- First rally: 1973 Monte Carlo Rally
- First win: 1980 Swedish Rally
- Last rally: 1988 Swedish Rally

Anders Göran Kulläng (23 September 1943 – 28 February 2012) was a Swedish rally and rallycross driver. His biggest success was to win the 1980 Swedish Rally.

== Career ==
Kulläng began his rallying career in 1962. He competed in the first ever World Rally Championship round, the 1973 Monte Carlo Rally, in an Opel Ascona. He continued to compete on WRC rounds for Opel until 1981, including winning the 1980 Swedish Rally. During 1981, he became an official driver for Mitsubishi Ralliart.

Kulläng later ran his own rally school in Sweden. His pupils included Colin McRae and Sébastien Loeb.

== Death ==
On 28 February 2012, Kulläng drowned whilst on vacation in Huay Yang, Thailand.

== WRC victories ==
#	Event	Season	Co-driver	Car
1	(Sweden) 30th International Swedish Rally	1980	Bruno Berglund	Opel Ascona 400

== Racing record ==
=== Complete IMC results ===
Year	Entrant	Car	1	2	3	4	5	6	7	8	9
1970	Forshaga MC	Opel Kadett Rallye	MON	SWE; 7	ITA	KEN	AUT	GRE			
1970	GM Dealers Sweden	Opel Kadett Rallye							GBR; Ret		
1971	Opel Rally Team	Opel Kadett Rallye	MON	SWE; 7	ITA	KEN	MAR	AUT	GRE	FRA	GBR
1972	Forshaga MC	Opel Ascona SR	MON	SWE; 4	KEN	MAR	GRE	AUT	ITA	USA	
1972	GM Dealers Association	Opel Ascona SR									GBR; 3

=== Complete WRC results ===
Year	Entrant	Car	1	2	3	4	5	6	7	8	9	10	11	12	13	WDC	Pts
1973	General Motors	Opel Ascona	MON; 13	SWE	POR	KEN	MOR	GRE	POL	FIN	AUT	ITA	USA			N/A	N/A
1973	GM Dealers Association	Opel Ascona												GBR; Ret	FRA	N/A	N/A
1974	Opel Rally Team	Opel Ascona	POR	KEN	FIN; 8	ITA	CAN	USA	GBR	FRA						N/A	N/A
1975	GMs ÅF-förening	Opel Ascona SR		SWE; Ret	KEN	GRE	MOR	POR								N/A	N/A
1975	Opel Euro Händler Team	Opel Ascona SR	MON; Ret						FIN; 5	ITA	FRA					N/A	N/A
1975	Opel Euro Händler Team	Opel Kadett GT/E										GBR; Ret				N/A	N/A
1976	Opel Euro Händler Team	Opel Kadett GT/E	MON; Ret		POR; Ret	KEN	GRC	MOR	FIN; Ret	ITA	FRA	GBR; 7				N/A	N/A
1976	Opel Team Sweden	Opel Ascona SR		SWE; 3												N/A	N/A
1977	MK Team Westom	Opel Kadett GT/E	MON	SWE; 3	POR	KEN	NZL	GRC	FIN	CAN	ITA	FRA				N/A	N/A
1977	Opel Euro Händler Team	Opel Kadett GT/E											GBR; 15			N/A	N/A
1978	Opel Euro Händler Team	Opel Kadett GT/E	MON; 9			POR; 6	GRE; Ret	FIN; 7	CAN; 3	ITA	CIV	FRA	GBR; 5			N/A	N/A
1978	Opel Mobil Dealer Team Sweden	Opel Kadett GT/E		SWE; Ret	KEN											N/A	N/A
1979	Opel Dealer Team Holland	Opel Kadett GT/E	MON; Ret	SWE; Ret	POR; Ret	KEN	GRE; Ret	NZL	FIN; Ret	CAN	ITA	FRA	GBR	CIV		NC	0
1980	Opel Euro Händler Team	Opel Ascona 400	MON; 4	SWE; 1	POR; Ret	KEN	GRC; 4	ARG	FIN; Ret	NZL	ITA; Ret	FRA	GBR; 5	CIV		5th	48
1981	Publimmo Racing	Opel Ascona 400	MON; 4	SWE; 4	POR; Ret	KEN; Ret	FRA									15th	22
1981	Team Ralliart	Mitsubishi Lancer 2000 Turbo						GRC; Ret	ARG	BRA	FIN; 12	ITA	CIV	GBR; 9		15th	22
1982	Team Ralliart	Mitsubishi Lancer 2000 Turbo	MON	SWE	POR	KEN	FRA	GRC	NZL	BRA	FIN; Ret	ITA; 7	CIV	GBR; Ret		41st	4
1984	Team Volvo	Volvo 240 Turbo	MON	SWE; Ret	POR	KEN	FRA	GRC	NZL	ARG	FIN	ITA	CIV	GBR		NC	0
1988	Anders Kulläng	BMW 325iX	MON	SWE; 28	POR	KEN	FRA	GRC	USA	NZL	ARG	FIN	CIV	ITA	GBR	NC	0
