= Colin's Crest =

Jumping arena in Sweden

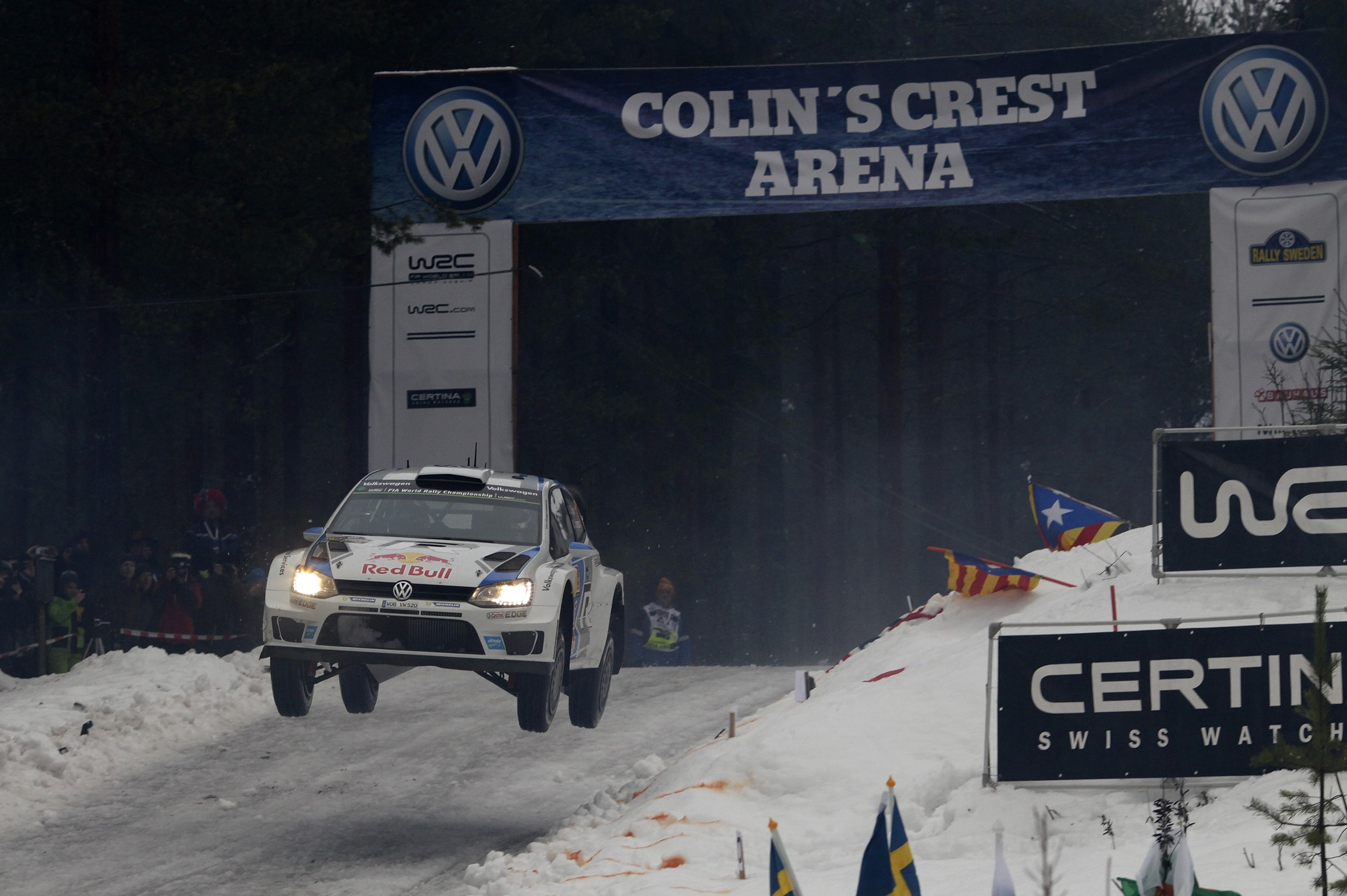
Sébastien Ogier and Julien Ingrassia jumping at Colin's Crest.

Colin's Crest (also known as Colin's Crest Arena) is a spectacular jump of the Rally Sweden in Värmland. Introduced first in 2008, it is designed as a snowy tribute to the 1995 World Rally Champion Colin McRae.

== Colin's Crest Award ==
As a mark of respect for Colin McRae, the Rally Sweden organisers set up an award for the longest jump over a crest on the Vargåsen stage of the rally.

Year	Driver	Car	Jump
2008	(United Arab Emirates) Khalid Al Qassimi	Ford Focus RS WRC	36 m (39.37 yd)
2010	(Norway) Marius Aasen	Subaru Impreza STi	37 m (40.46 yd)
2011	(United States) Ken Block	Ford Fiesta RS WRC	37 m (40.46 yd)
2012	(Estonia) Ott Tänak	Ford Fiesta RS WRC	32 m (35.00 yd)
2013	(Belgium) Thierry Neuville	Ford Fiesta RS WRC	35 m (38.28 yd)
2014	(Finland) Juho Hänninen	Hyundai i20 WRC	36 m (39.37 yd)
2015	(Belgium) Thierry Neuville	Hyundai i20 WRC	44 m (48.12 yd)
2016	(Norway) Eyvind Brynildsen	Ford Fiesta R5	45 m (49.21 yd)
2017	(Norway) Mads Østberg	Ford Fiesta WRC	44 m (48.12 yd)
2018	(Norway) Mads Østberg	Citroën C3 WRC	42 m (45.93 yd)
2019	(United Kingdom) Kris Meeke	Toyota Yaris WRC	41 m (44.84 yd)

== Gallery ==
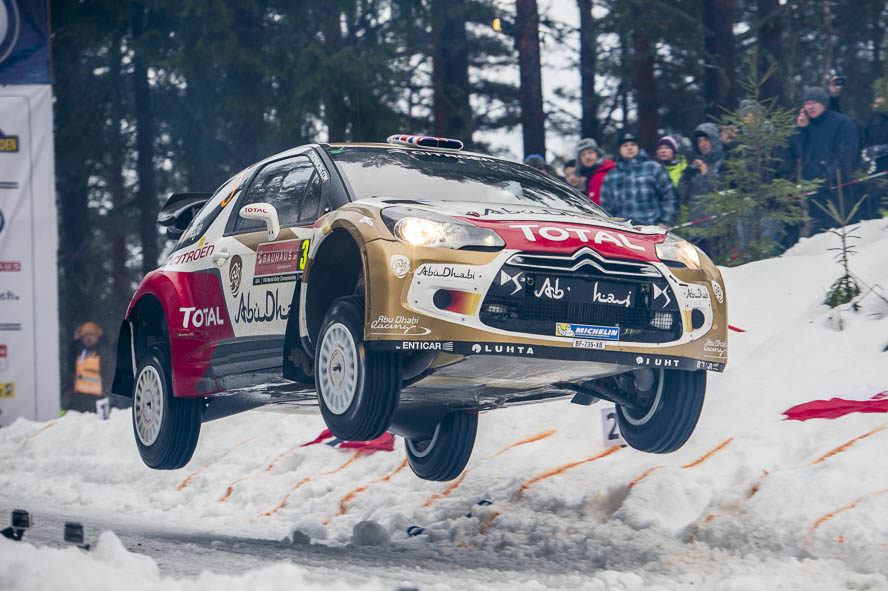

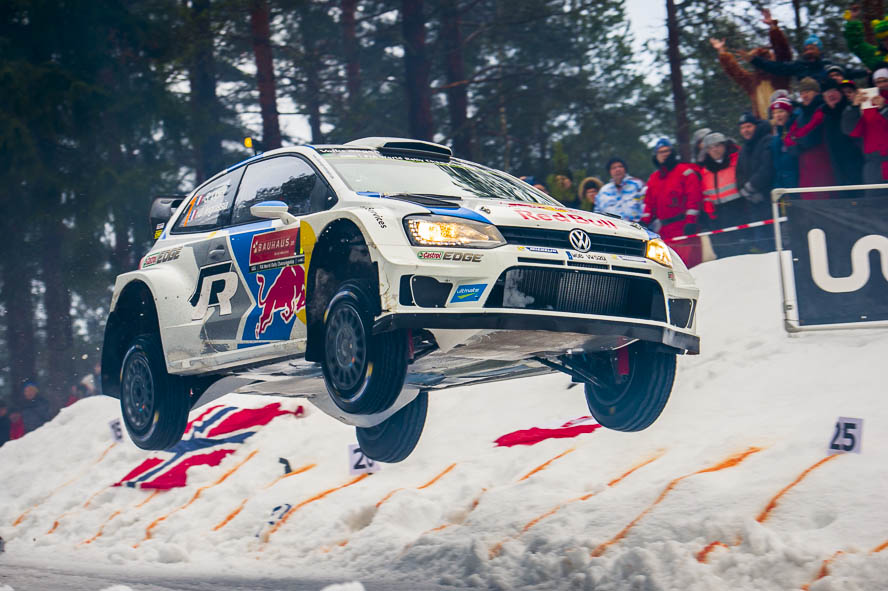

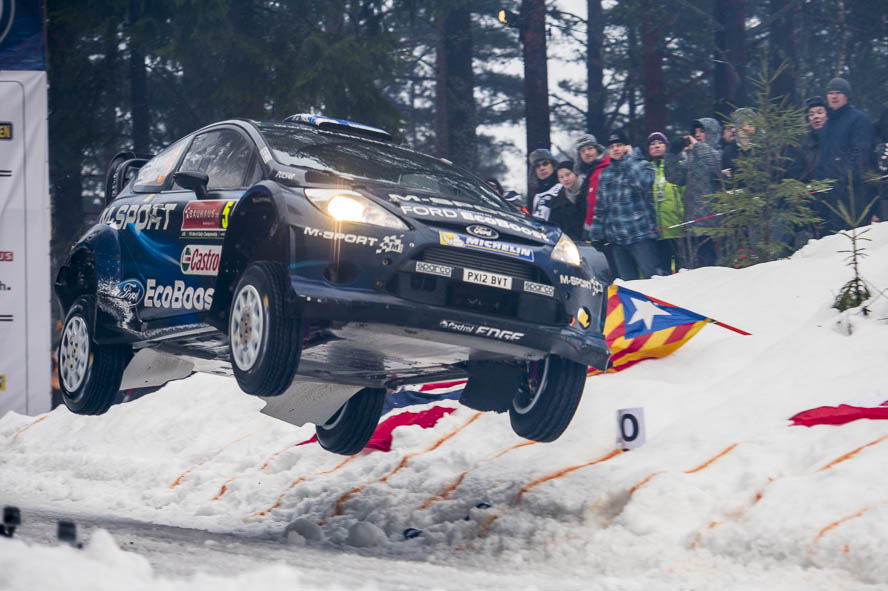

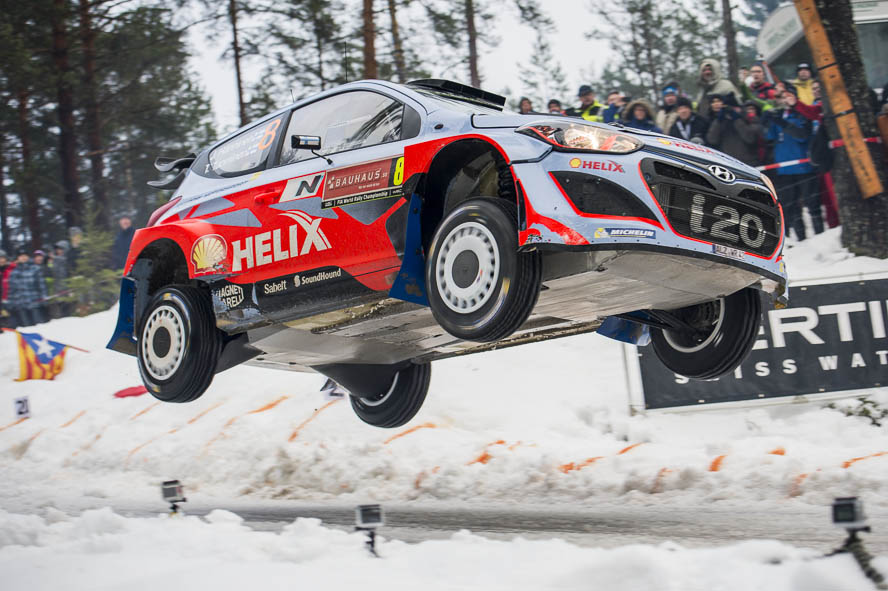

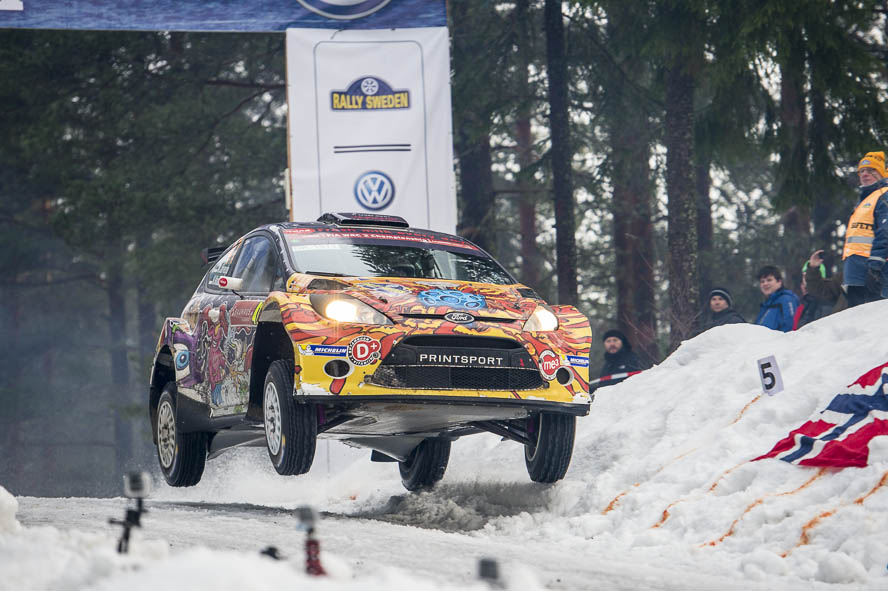

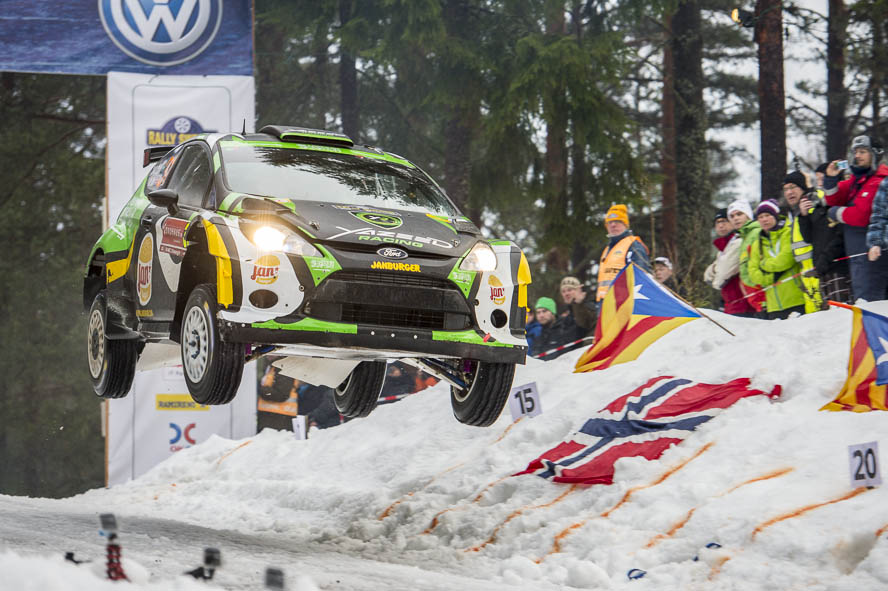
