= Arne Hertz =

Swedish rally co-driver (born 1939)

- Hertz (left) with Hannu Mikkola after winning the 1982 Scottish Rally

Personal information
- Nationality: (Sweden) Swedish
- Born: 6 June 1939 (age 87)

World Rally Championship record
- Years active: 1973–1999
- Driver: (Sweden) Stig Blomqvist (Sweden) Håkan Lindberg (Sweden) Ove Andersson (Sweden) Björn Waldegård (Finland) Simo Lampinen (Finland) Hannu Mikkola (France) Michèle Mouton (Germany) Armin Schwarz (Belgium) Grégoire de Mevius (Japan) Yoshio Fujimoto (Saudi Arabia) Abdullah Bakhashab (Sweden) Mats Karlsson (United Kingdom) Martin Brundle
- Teams: Saab, Fiat, Toyota, Lancia, Ford, Mercedes-Benz, Audi, Mazda
- Rallies: 133
- Co-championships: 1 (1983)
- Rally wins: 18
- Podiums: 45
- First rally: 1973 Swedish Rally
- First win: 1973 Swedish Rally
- Last win: 1991 Rallye Catalunya
- Last rally: 1999 Rally of Great Britain

Arne Hertz (born 6 June 1939) is a former rally co-driver from Sweden.

== Biography ==
Hertz's name first became prominent when co-driving for Stig Blomqvist (Saab 96 V4), with whom he first won the RAC Rally, in 1971. With Blomqvist, in the same year, he also won the Hankiralli, the Swedish Rally and the 1000 Lakes Rally. This same partnership won the Swedish Rally, in 1972 and 1973, also in a Saab 96 V4.

Hertz's most successful period was from 1977 till 1990 when he partnered Finnish driver Hannu Mikkola, first in the Ford Escort RS1600, later moving on to the RS1800. He won the RAC Rally for a second time with Mikkola, in 1978 in the Escort. The pair left Ford in 1980 to join the Audi team, using the 4 wheel drive Quattro and won the RAC Rally again in 1981 for the German team. He also navigated Mikkola to his world title in 1983, again in the venerable Quattro. The pair were always contenders on any event they entered during their thirteen years together.

In 1988 when Mikkola switched to the Mazda team, Hertz stayed with Audi, teaming up with German driver Armin Schwarz.
