= Björn Cederberg =

Swedish rally co-driver (born 1937)

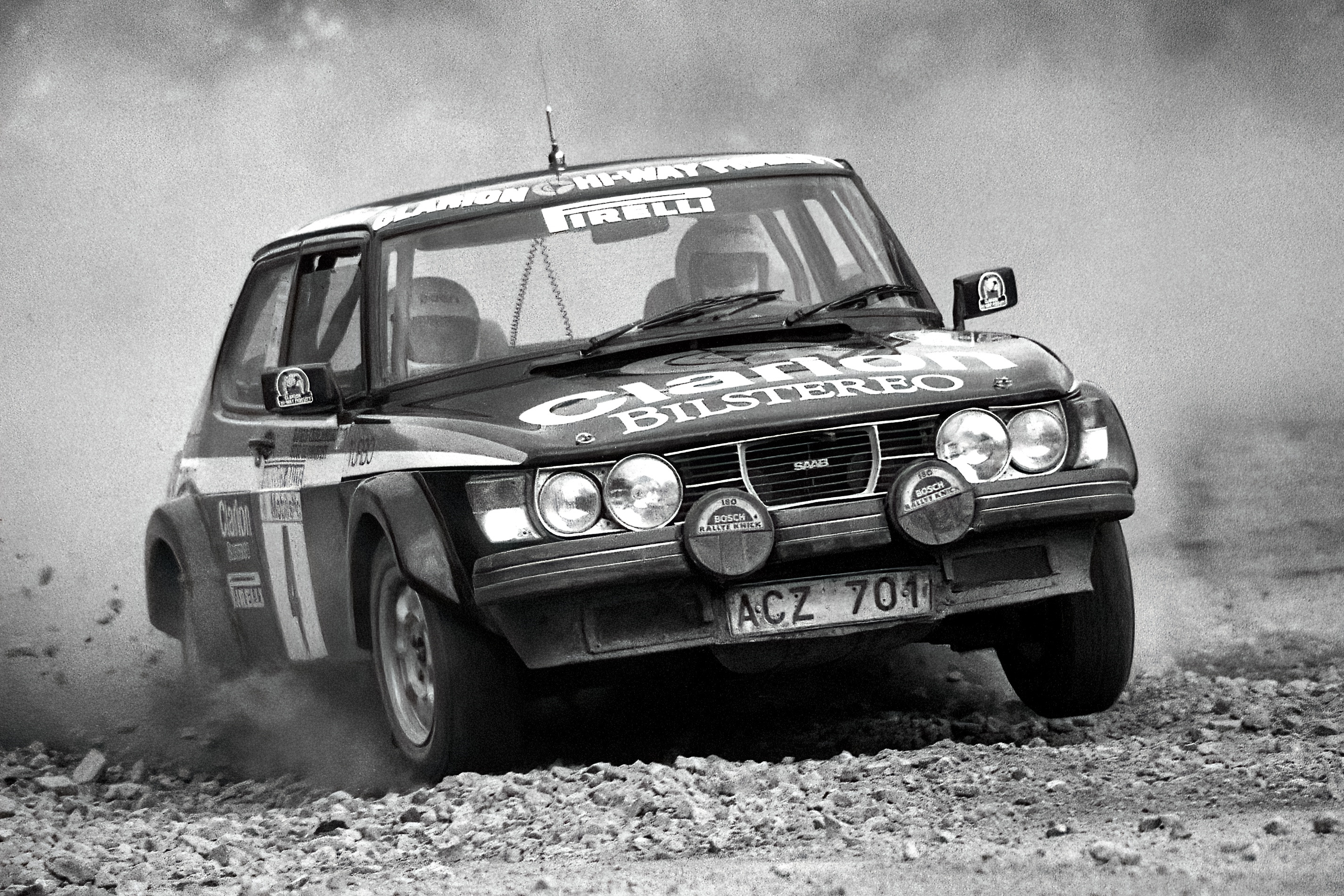
Blomqvist/Cederberg in the Saab 99 Turbo (Hunsrück-Rallye 1980)

Björn Cederberg (born 23 July 1937), nicknamed "Kapten" (engl. Captain, due to his rank in the Swedish Army), is a notable Swedish rally co-driver. His most famous and successful partnership was with Stig Blomqvist, in a Saab 99 Turbo, with whom he shared success in a number of international motor rallies, from 1979 to 1982. Later in 1982, the pair went on to rally the Audi Quattro, with which they were again very successful until 1985.
