= 1984 World Rally Championship =

12th season of the FIA World Rally Championship

Champions
- World Drivers' Champion: Stig Blomqvist
- World Manufacturers' Champion: Audi

Seasons
- ← 1983 1985 →

The 1984 World Rally Championship was the 12th season of the Fédération Internationale de l'Automobile (FIA) World Rally Championship (WRC). The season consisted of 12 rallies following the same schedule as the previous season. Stig Blomqvist beat the defending world champion and Audi teammate Hannu Mikkola to the drivers' title. Audi took their second manufacturers' title, ahead of Lancia and the debuting Peugeot.

== Summary ==
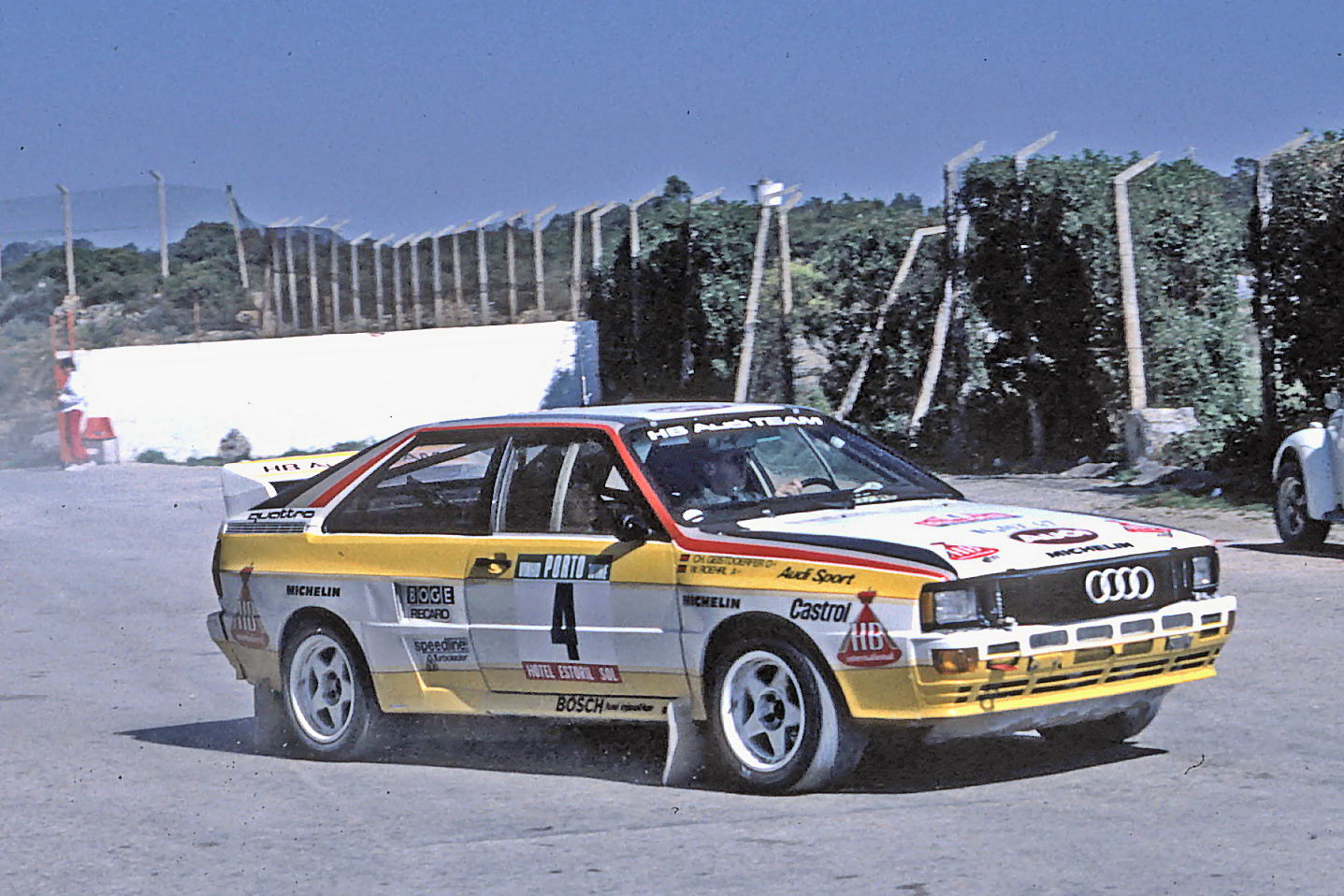
Walter Röhrl at the 1984 Rally Portugal

German team Audi Sport put together four of the top drivers in the world, with the defending world champion Hannu Mikkola returning to the team along with Stig Blomqvist. Michèle Mouton had a part-time contract and two-time champion Walter Röhrl was added from Martini Racing. Lancia Martini kept Markku Alén as their primary driver for the season and also featured Miki Biasion and Attilio Bettega. Lancia boss Cesare Fiorio had also signed Henri Toivonen from Porsche, stating that "Audi will have four top drivers next year so it would be very difficult competing with only two."

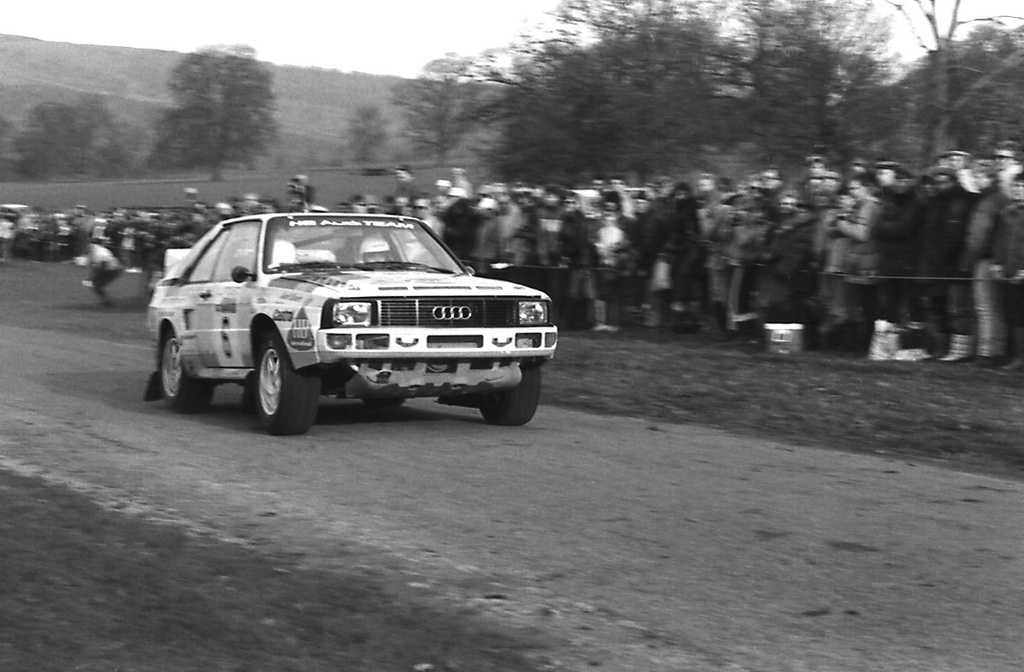
Michèle Mouton at the 1984 RAC Rally

Blomqvist and Mikkola dominated the season in the Audi Quattro A2, with Blomqvist proving the best with five rally wins. Audi established an early lead, winning six of the first eight events, including sweeping the podium at the first two rallies. Mikkola had to settle for second overall despite a consistently strong season in which he took eight podium finishes. Alén was only able to reach third place, only capturing a single rally win in his Lancia Rally 037.

Late in the season, Ari Vatanen returned to the world rally scene in a Peugeot 205 T16, winning three of the final four rallies and reaching fourth place in the overall standings. His performance showed that Peugeot Sport, headed by Jean Todt, had a winner that could beat the Audi, which they would do in the coming years of Group B dominance.

As with previous seasons, while all twelve events were calculated for tallying the drivers' scores, only ten of the events applied to the championship for manufacturers. The two events in 1984 which applied only to driver standings were the Swedish Rally and the Rallye Côte d'Ivoire.

== Calendar ==
Rd.	Start date	Finish date	Rally	Rally headquarters	Surface	Stages	Distance	Points
1	21 January	27 January	(Monaco) 52nd Rallye Automobile Monte-Carlo	Monte Carlo	Mixed	30	753.20 km	Drivers & Manufacturers
2	10 February	12 February	(Sweden) 34th International Swedish Rally	Karlstad, Värmland County	Snow	27	447.70 km	Drivers only
3	6 March	10 March	18th Rallye de Portugal - Vinho do Porto	Estoril, Lisbon	Mixed	45	685 km	Drivers & Manufacturers
4	19 April	23 April	(Kenya) 32nd Marlboro Safari Rally	Nairobi	Gravel	N/A	5254 km	Drivers & Manufacturers
5	3 May	5 May	28th Tour de Corse - Rallye de France	Ajaccio, Corsica	Tarmac	30	1130.09 km	Drivers & Manufacturers
6	26 May	31 May	(Greece) 31st Rothmans Acropolis Rally	Athens	Gravel	47	796.62 km	Drivers & Manufacturers
7	23 June	26 June	15th Sanyo Rally of New Zealand	Auckland	Gravel	45	1063.26 km	Drivers & Manufacturers
8	27 July	1 August	4th Marlboro Rally of Argentina YPF	Buenos Aires	Gravel	24	948.58 km	Drivers & Manufacturers
9	24 August	26 August	(Finland) 34th Rally of the 1000 Lakes	Jyväskylä, Central Finland	Gravel	51	460.96 km	Drivers & Manufacturers
10	30 September	5 October	(Italy) 26th Rallye Sanremo	Sanremo, Liguria	Mixed	56	807.69 km	Drivers & Manufacturers
11	31 October	4 November	(Ivory Coast) 16th Rallye Cote d'Ivoire	Abidjan	Gravel	N/A	4012 km	Drivers only
12	25 November	29 November	(United Kingdom) 40th Lombard RAC Rally	Chester, Cheshire	Gravel	56	868.54 km	Drivers & Manufacturers

== Teams and drivers ==
Team	Manufacturer	Car	Tyre	Drivers	Rounds
(Germany) Audi Sport	Audi	Quattro A2; Quattro Sport	M P	(Germany) Walter Röhrl	1, 3, 5–7, 10
(Germany) Audi Sport	Audi	Quattro A2; Quattro Sport	M P	(Finland) Hannu Mikkola	1, 3–4, 6–9, 11–12
(Germany) Audi Sport	Audi	Quattro A2; Quattro Sport	M P	(Sweden) Stig Blomqvist	All
(Germany) Audi Sport	Audi	Quattro A2; Quattro Sport	M P	(Sweden) Per Eklund	2, 9
(Germany) Audi Sport	Audi	Quattro A2; Quattro Sport	M P	(France) Michèle Mouton	2, 4, 6, 9, 12
(Germany) Audi Sport	Audi	Quattro A2; Quattro Sport	M P	(Finland) Lasse Lampi	2, 9
(Germany) Audi Sport	Audi	Quattro A2; Quattro Sport	M P	(South Africa) Sarel van der Merwe	3
(Germany) Audi Sport	Audi	Quattro A2; Quattro Sport	M P	(Austria) Franz Wittmann	4, 7
(Germany) Audi Sport	Audi	Quattro A2; Quattro Sport	M P	(France) Bernard Darniche	5
(Germany) Audi Sport	Audi	Quattro A2; Quattro Sport	M P	(United States) John Buffum	6, 12
(Germany) Audi Sport	Audi	Quattro A2; Quattro Sport	M P	(Argentina) Jorge Recalde	8
(Germany) Audi Sport	Audi	Quattro A2; Quattro Sport	M P	(Argentina) Rubén Luis di Palma	8
(Italy) Martini Racing	Lancia	Rally 037 evo	P	(Finland) Markku Alén	1, 3–7, 9–10
(Italy) Martini Racing	Lancia	Rally 037 evo	P	(France) Jean-Claude Andruet	1, 5
(Italy) Martini Racing	Lancia	Rally 037 evo	P	(Italy) Attilio Bettega	1, 3, 5–6, 10
(Italy) Martini Racing	Lancia	Rally 037 evo	P	(Finland) Henri Toivonen	3, 6, 9
(Italy) Martini Racing	Lancia	Rally 037 evo	P	(Kenya) Vic Preston Jr	4
(Italy) Martini Racing	Lancia	Rally 037 evo	P	(Kenya) Greg Criticos	4
(Japan) Team Nissan Europe	Nissan	240RS	D	(Finland) Timo Salonen	1, 4, 6–7, 12
(Japan) Team Nissan Europe	Nissan	240RS	D	(United Kingdom) Terry Kaby	1, 9, 12
(Japan) Team Nissan Europe	Nissan	240RS	D	(Sweden) Sören Nilsson	2
(Japan) Team Nissan Europe	Nissan	240RS	D	(Finland) Erkki Pitkanen	3, 9
(Japan) Team Nissan Europe	Nissan	240RS	D	(Kenya) Shekhar Mehta	4, 6, 11–12
(Japan) Team Nissan Europe	Nissan	240RS	D	(Kenya) Mike Kirkland	4
(Japan) Team Nissan Europe	Nissan	240RS	D	(Kenya) Jayant Shah	4, 6
(Japan) Team Nissan Europe	Nissan	240RS	D	(Greece) George Moschous	6
(Japan) Team Nissan Europe	Nissan	240RS	D	(Greece) Stratis Hatzipanayiotou	6
(Japan) Team Nissan Europe	Nissan	240RS	D	(New Zealand) Reg Cook	7
(Japan) Team Nissan Europe	Nissan	240RS	D	(Finland) Pentti Airikkala	9
(Japan) Team Nissan Europe	Nissan	240RS	D	(Finland) Peter Geitel	9, 12
(France) Renault Elf	Renault	5 Turbo	M P	(France) Jean-Luc Thérier	1
(France) Renault Elf	Renault	5 Turbo	M P	(France) Bruno Saby	1, 5, 9
(France) Renault Elf	Renault	5 Turbo	M P	(France) François Chatriot	1, 5
(France) Renault Elf	Renault	5 Turbo	M P	(France) Dany Snobeck	1
(France) Renault Elf	Renault	5 Turbo	M P	(France) Jean Ragnotti	3, 5
(France) Renault Elf	Renault	5 Turbo	M P	(Portugal) Joaquim Moutinho	3
(France) Renault Elf	Renault	5 Turbo	M P	(France) Jean-Pierre Manzagol	5
(France) Renault Elf	Renault	5 Turbo	M P	(France) Didier Auriol	5
(France) Renault Elf	Renault	5 Turbo	M P	(France) Camille Bartoli	5
(Italy) Jolly Club	Lancia	Rally 037 evo	P	(Italy) Miki Biasion	1, 3, 5–6, 10
(Italy) Jolly Club	Lancia	Rally 037 evo	P	(Italy) Adartico Vudafieri	5, 10
(Japan) Mazda Rally Team Europe	Mazda	RX-7	P	(Germany) Achim Warmbold	1, 6
(Japan) Mazda Rally Team Europe	Mazda	RX-7	P	(Finland) Minna Sillankorva	1
(Japan) Mazda Rally Team Europe	Mazda	RX-7	P	(Sweden) Ingvar Carlsson	6, 12
(Japan) Mazda Rally Team Europe	Mazda	RX-7	P	(France) Philippe Wambergue	12
(Japan) Mazda Rally Team Europe	Mazda	RX-7	P	(France) Marianne Hoepfner	12
(France) Citroën Compétitions	Citroën	Visa	M	(France) Christian Dorche	1, 3
(France) Citroën Compétitions	Citroën	Visa	M	(France) Maurice Chomat	4, 9–10
(France) Citroën Compétitions	Citroën	Visa	M	(France) Philippe Wambergue	4, 9–10
(France) Citroën Compétitions	Citroën	Visa	M	(France) Christian Rio	4, 9–10
(France) Citroën Compétitions	Citroën	Visa	M	(France) Oliver Tabatoni	5–6, 9
(France) Citroën Compétitions	Citroën	Visa	M	(United Kingdom) Mark Lovell	12
(Germany) Opel Euro Team	Opel	Ascona 400; Manta 400	M	(Sweden) Mats Jonsson	2, 12
(Germany) Opel Euro Team	Opel	Ascona 400; Manta 400	M	(United Kingdom) Alex Jackson	2
(Germany) Opel Euro Team	Opel	Ascona 400; Manta 400	M	(France) Guy Frequelin	4–5
(Germany) Opel Euro Team	Opel	Ascona 400; Manta 400	M	(Finland) Rauno Aaltonen	4
(Germany) Opel Euro Team	Opel	Ascona 400; Manta 400	M	(Japan) Yasuhiro Iwase	4, 8
(Germany) Opel Euro Team	Opel	Ascona 400; Manta 400	M	(France) Alain Ambrosino	11
(Germany) Opel Euro Team	Opel	Ascona 400; Manta 400	M	(United Kingdom) Jimmy McRae	12
(Germany) Opel Euro Team	Opel	Ascona 400; Manta 400	M	(United Kingdom) Russell Brookes	12
(Germany) Opel Euro Team	Opel	Ascona 400; Manta 400	M	(United Kingdom) Phil Collins	12
(Germany) Opel Euro Team	Opel	Ascona 400; Manta 400	M	(United Kingdom) Bertie Fisher	12
(Japan) Toyota Team Europe	Toyota	Celica TCT	P	(Sweden) Björn Waldegård	3–4, 7, 9, 12
(Japan) Toyota Team Europe	Toyota	Celica TCT	P	(Finland) Juha Kankkunen	3, 7, 9, 12
(Japan) Toyota Team Europe	Toyota	Celica TCT	P	(Sweden) Per Eklund	4, 12
(Japan) Toyota Team Europe	Toyota	Celica TCT	P	(Italy) Sandro Munari	4
(France) Peugeot Talbot Sport	Peugeot	205 Turbo 16	M	(Finland) Ari Vatanen	5–6, 9–10, 12
(France) Peugeot Talbot Sport	Peugeot	205 Turbo 16	M	(France) Jean-Pierre Nicolas	5–6, 10
(Germany) Rothmans Porsche Rally Team	Porsche	911SC RS	M	(Qatar) Saeed Al-Hajri	6, 12
(Germany) Rothmans Porsche Rally Team	Porsche	911SC RS	M	(United Kingdom) Roger Clark	12
(Germany) Volkswagen Motorsport	Volkswagen	Golf GTi	P	(Sweden) Kalle Grundel	1–3, 5, 9–10, 12

== Events ==
=== Map ===
Black = Tarmac	Brown = Gravel	Blue = Snow/ice	Red = Mixed surface

=== Schedule and results ===
Round	Rally name	Stages	Podium finishers					
Round	Rally name	Stages	Rank	Driver	Co-driver	Team	Car	Time
1	(Monaco) Rallye Monte Carlo (21–27 January)	30 stages 722 km Tarmac	1	(West Germany) Walter Röhrl	(West Germany) Christian Geistdörfer	(West Germany) Audi Sport	Audi Quattro A2	8:52:29
1	(Monaco) Rallye Monte Carlo (21–27 January)	30 stages 722 km Tarmac	2	(Sweden) Stig Blomqvist	(Sweden) Björn Cederberg	(West Germany) Audi Sport	Audi Quattro A2	8:53:42
1	(Monaco) Rallye Monte Carlo (21–27 January)	30 stages 722 km Tarmac	3	(Finland) Hannu Mikkola	(Sweden) Arne Hertz	(West Germany) Audi Sport	Audi Quattro A2	9:05:09
2	(Sweden) Swedish Rally (10–12 February)	27 stages 450 km Snow/Ice	1	(Sweden) Stig Blomqvist	(Sweden) Björn Cederberg	(West Germany) Audi Sport	Audi Quattro A2	4:16:45
2	(Sweden) Swedish Rally (10–12 February)	27 stages 450 km Snow/Ice	2	(France) Michèle Mouton	(Italy) Fabrizia Pons	(West Germany) Audi Sport	Audi Quattro A2	4:24:12
2	(Sweden) Swedish Rally (10–12 February)	27 stages 450 km Snow/Ice	3	(Sweden) Per Eklund	(United Kingdom) Dave Whittock	(West Germany) Audi Sport	Audi Quattro A2	4:33:27
3	Rallye de Portugal (6–11 March)	45 stages 684 km Gravel/Tarmac	1	(Finland) Hannu Mikkola	(Sweden) Arne Hertz	(West Germany) Audi Sport	Audi Quattro A2	7:35:32
3	Rallye de Portugal (6–11 March)	45 stages 684 km Gravel/Tarmac	2	(Finland) Markku Alén	(Finland) Ilkka Kivimäki	(Italy) Martini Racing	Lancia Rally 037 evo	7:35:59
3	Rallye de Portugal (6–11 March)	45 stages 684 km Gravel/Tarmac	3	(Italy) Attilio Bettega	(Italy) Maurizio Perissinot	(Italy) Martini Racing	Lancia Rally 037 evo	7:58:21
4	(Kenya) Safari Rally (19–23 April)	105 controls 5254 km Gravel	1	(Sweden) Björn Waldegård	(Sweden) Hans Thorszelius	(Japan) Toyota Team Europe	Toyota Celica TCT	+2:02 pen
4	(Kenya) Safari Rally (19–23 April)	105 controls 5254 km Gravel	2	(Finland) Rauno Aaltonen	(Kenya) Lofty Drews	(West Germany) Opel Euro Team	Opel Manta 400	+2:13 pen
4	(Kenya) Safari Rally (19–23 April)	105 controls 5254 km Gravel	3	(Finland) Hannu Mikkola	(Sweden) Arne Hertz	(West Germany) Audi Sport	Audi Quattro A2	+2:25 pen
5	(France) Tour de Corse (3–5 May)	30 stages 1119 km Tarmac	1	(Finland) Markku Alén	(Finland) Ilkka Kivimäki	(Italy) Martini Racing	Lancia Rally 037 evo	13:24:56
5	(France) Tour de Corse (3–5 May)	30 stages 1119 km Tarmac	2	(Italy) Miki Biasion	(Italy) Tiziano Siviero	(Italy) Jolly Club	Lancia Rally 037 evo	13:29:11
5	(France) Tour de Corse (3–5 May)	30 stages 1119 km Tarmac	3	(France) Jean Ragnotti	(France) Pierre Thimonier	(France) Renault Elf	Renault 5 Turbo	13:33:16
6	(Greece) Acropolis Rally (28–31 May)	47 stages 830 km Gravel	1	(Sweden) Stig Blomqvist	(Sweden) Björn Cederberg	(West Germany) Audi Sport	Audi Quattro A2	10:41:51
6	(Greece) Acropolis Rally (28–31 May)	47 stages 830 km Gravel	2	(Finland) Hannu Mikkola	(Sweden) Arne Hertz	(West Germany) Audi Sport	Audi Quattro A2	10:44:58
6	(Greece) Acropolis Rally (28–31 May)	47 stages 830 km Gravel	3	(Finland) Markku Alén	(Finland) Ilkka Kivimäki	(Italy) Martini Racing	Lancia Rally 037 evo	10:56:01
7	Rally New Zealand (23–26 June)	45 stages 1044 km Gravel	1	(Sweden) Stig Blomqvist	(Sweden) Björn Cederberg	(West Germany) Audi Sport	Audi Quattro A2	10:40:41
7	Rally New Zealand (23–26 June)	45 stages 1044 km Gravel	2	(Finland) Markku Alén	(Finland) Ilkka Kivimäki	(Italy) Martini Racing	Lancia Rally 037 evo	10:45:28
7	Rally New Zealand (23–26 June)	45 stages 1044 km Gravel	3	(Finland) Hannu Mikkola	(Sweden) Arne Hertz	(West Germany) Audi Sport	Audi Quattro A2	10:48:10
8	Rally Argentina (27 July – 1 August)	23 stages 948 km Gravel	1	(Sweden) Stig Blomqvist	(Sweden) Björn Cederberg	(West Germany) Audi Sport	Audi Quattro A2	10:33:38
8	Rally Argentina (27 July – 1 August)	23 stages 948 km Gravel	2	(Finland) Hannu Mikkola	(Sweden) Arne Hertz	(West Germany) Audi Sport	Audi Quattro A2	10:36:54
8	Rally Argentina (27 July – 1 August)	23 stages 948 km Gravel	3	(Argentina) Jorge Recalde	(Argentina) Jorge del Bouno	(West Germany) Audi Sport	Audi Quattro A2	10:38:48
9	(Finland) 1000 Lakes Rally (24–26 August)	50 stages 457 km Gravel	1	(Finland) Ari Vatanen	(United Kingdom) Terry Harryman	(France) Peugeot Talbot Sport	Peugeot 205 Turbo 16	4:07:27
9	(Finland) 1000 Lakes Rally (24–26 August)	50 stages 457 km Gravel	2	(Finland) Markku Alén	(Finland) Ilkka Kivimäki	(Italy) Martini Racing	Lancia Rally 037 evo	4:08:26
9	(Finland) 1000 Lakes Rally (24–26 August)	50 stages 457 km Gravel	3	(Finland) Henri Toivonen	(Finland) Juha Piironen	(Italy) Martini Racing	Lancia Rally 037 evo	4:10:19
10	(Italy) Rallye Sanremo (30 September – 5 October)	46 stages 777 km Gravel/Tarmac	1	(Finland) Ari Vatanen	(United Kingdom) Terry Harryman	(France) Peugeot Talbot Sport	Peugeot 205 Turbo 16	8:44:34
10	(Italy) Rallye Sanremo (30 September – 5 October)	46 stages 777 km Gravel/Tarmac	2	(Italy) Attilio Bettega	(Italy) Maurizio Perissinot	(Italy) Martini Racing	Lancia Rally 037 evo	8:50:01
10	(Italy) Rallye Sanremo (30 September – 5 October)	46 stages 777 km Gravel/Tarmac	3	(Italy) Miki Biasion	(Italy) Tiziano Siviero	(Italy) Jolly Club	Lancia Rally 037 evo	8:53:58
11	(Ivory Coast) Rallye Côte d'Ivoire (31 October – 5 November)	46 controls 4012 km Gravel	1	(Sweden) Stig Blomqvist	(Sweden) Björn Cederberg	(West Germany) Audi Sport	Audi Sport Quattro	+5:24 pen
11	(Ivory Coast) Rallye Côte d'Ivoire (31 October – 5 November)	46 controls 4012 km Gravel	2	(Finland) Hannu Mikkola	(Sweden) Arne Hertz	(West Germany) Audi Sport	Audi Quattro A2	+5:46 pen
11	(Ivory Coast) Rallye Côte d'Ivoire (31 October – 5 November)	46 controls 4012 km Gravel	3	(Kenya) Shekhar Mehta	(Kenya) Yvonne Mehta	(Japan) Team Nissan Europe	Nissan 240RS	+6:28 pen
12	(United Kingdom) RAC Rally (November 25–29)	56 stages 863 km Gravel/Tarmac	1	(Finland) Ari Vatanen	(United Kingdom) Terry Harryman	(France) Peugeot Talbot Sport	Peugeot 205 Turbo 16	9:19:48
12	(United Kingdom) RAC Rally (November 25–29)	56 stages 863 km Gravel/Tarmac	2	(Finland) Hannu Mikkola	(Sweden) Arne Hertz	(West Germany) Audi Sport	Audi Quattro A2	9:20:29
12	(United Kingdom) RAC Rally (November 25–29)	56 stages 863 km Gravel/Tarmac	3	(Sweden) Per Eklund	(United Kingdom) Dave Whittock	(Japan) Toyota Team Europe	Toyota Celica TCT	9:37:07

== Standings ==
=== Drivers' championship ===
Rank	Driver	Event												Total points
Rank	Driver	(Monaco) MON	(Sweden) SWE	(Portugal) POR	(Kenya) KEN	(France) FRA	(Greece) GRC	(New Zealand) NZL	(Argentina) ARG	(Finland) FIN	(Italy) ITA	(Ivory Coast) CIV	(United Kingdom) GBR	Total points
1	(Sweden) Stig Blomqvist	15	20	0	0	(8)	20	20	20	10	0	20	0	125
2	(Finland) Hannu Mikkola	12	–	20	12	–	15	(12)	15	0	–	15	15	104
3	(Finland) Markku Alén	3	–	15	10	20	12	15	–	15	0	–	–	90
4	(Finland) Ari Vatanen	–	–	–	–	0	0	–	–	20	20	–	20	60
5	(Italy) Attilio Bettega	8	–	12	–	4	10	–	–	–	15	–	–	49
6	(Italy) Miki Biasion	6	–	10	–	15	0	–	–	–	12	–	–	43
7	(Sweden) Per Eklund	–	12	–	0	–	–	–	–	6	–	–	12	30
8	(Sweden) Björn Waldegård	–	–	0	20	–	–	8	–	0	–	–	0	28
9	(Kenya) Shekhar Mehta	0	–	–	8	–	4	–	–	–	–	12	3	27
10	(Finland) Timo Salonen	1	–	–	4	–	6	10	–	–	–	–	6	27
11	(West Germany) Walter Röhrl	20	–	6	–	0	0	0	–	–	0	–	–	26
12	(France) Michèle Mouton	–	15	–	0	–	0	–	–	0	–	–	10	25
13	(France) Jean Ragnotti	–	–	8	–	12	–	–	–	–	–	–	–	20
14	(France) Jean-Pierre Nicolas	–	–	–	–	10	0	–	–	–	8	–	–	18
15	(Finland) Rauno Aaltonen	–	–	–	15	–	–	–	–	–	–	–	–	15
16	(Argentina) Jorge Recalde	–	–	–	–	–	–	-	12	–	–	–	–	12
16	(Finland) Henri Toivonen	–	–	0	–	–	0	–	–	12	–	–	–	12
18	(Sweden) Kalle Grundel	2	0	4	–	–	–	–	–	0	6	–	0	12
19	(France) Jean-Luc Thérier	10	–	–	–	–	–	–	–	–	–	–	–	10
19	(Sweden) Mats Jonsson	–	10	–	–	–	–	–	–	–	–	–	0	10
19	(Argentina) Mario Stillo	–	–	–	–	–	–	–	10	–	–	–	–	10
19	(Italy) Fabrizio Tabaton	–	–	–	–	–	–	–	–	–	10	–	–	10
19	(France) Alain Ambrosino	–	–	–	–	–	–	–	–	–	–	10	–	10
24	(Sweden) Lars-Erik Torph	–	8	–	–	–	–	–	–	–	–	–	0	8
24	(United States) John Buffum	–	–	–	–	8	–	–	–	–	–	–	0	8
24	(Japan) Yasuhiro Iwase	–	–	–	–	–	–	8	–	–	–	–	–	8
24	(Finland) Juha Kankkunen	–	–	0	–	–	–	0	–	8	–	–	0	8
24	(Kenya) David Horsey	–	–	–	–	–	–	–	–	–	–	8	–	8
24	(United Kingdom) Russell Brookes	–	–	–	–	–	–	–	–	–	–	–	8	8
30	(Sweden) Björn Johansson	–	6	–	–	–	–	–	–	–	–	–	–	6
30	(Kenya) Vic Preston, Jr.	–	–	–	6	–	–	–	–	–	–	–	–	6
30	(France) Jean-Claude Andruet	0	–	–	–	6	–	–	–	–	–	–	–	6
30	(New Zealand) Reg Cook	–	–	–	–	–	–	6	–	–	–	–	–	6
30	(Argentina) Miguel Torrás	–	–	–	–	–	–	–	6	–	–	–	–	6
30	(France) Patrick Tauziac	–	–	–	–	–	–	–	–	–	–	6	–	6
36	(France) Bernard Darniche	4	–	–	–	0	–	–	–	–	–	–	–	4
36	(Sweden) Kenneth Eriksson	–	4	–	–	–	–	–	–	–	–	–	0	4
36	(New Zealand) Malcolm Stewart	–	–	–	–	–	–	4	–	–	–	–	–	4
36	(Argentina) Carlos Bassi	–	–	–	–	–	–	–	4	–	–	–	–	4
36	(Finland) Erkki Pitkänen	–	–	0	–	–	–	–	–	4	–	–	–	4
36	(San Marino) Massimo Ercolani	–	–	–	–	–	–	–	–	–	4	–	–	4
36	(United Kingdom) Jimmy McRae	–	–	–	–	–	–	–	–	–	–	–	4	4
43	(Sweden) Stig Andervang	–	3	–	–	–	–	–	–	–	–	–	0	3
43	(Portugal) Jorge Ortigão	–	–	3	–	–	–	–	–	–	–	–	–	3
43	(Austria) Franz Wittmann	–	–	–	3	–	–	0	–	–	–	–	–	3
43	(France) François Chatriot	0	–	–	–	3	–	–	–	–	–	–	–	3
43	(Greece) Iórgos Moschous	–	–	–	–	–	3	–	–	–	–	–	–	3
43	(New Zealand) 'Possum' Bourne	–	–	–	–	–	–	3	–	–	–	–	–	3
43	(Argentina) Hugo Hernández	–	–	–	–	–	–	–	3	–	–	–	–	3
43	(France) Bruno Saby	0	–	–	–	0	–	–	–	3	–	–	0	3
43	(Austria) Gerhard Kalnay	–	–	–	–	–	–	–	–	–	3	–	–	3
52	(Japan) Yoshio Iwashita	–	–	–	2	–	1	–	–	–	–	–	–	3
53	(Sweden) Gunnar Pettersson	–	2	–	–	–	–	–	–	–	–	–	–	2
53	(France) Christian Dorche	0	–	2	–	–	–	–	–	–	–	–	–	2
53	(France) Guy Fréquelin	–	–	–	0	2	–	–	–	–	–	–	–	2
53	(West Germany) Achim Warmbold	0	–	–	–	–	2	–	–	–	–	–	–	2
53	(New Zealand) Tony Teesdale	–	–	–	–	–	–	2	–	–	–	–	–	2
53	(Argentina) Monnenmacher Pérez	–	–	–	–	–	–	–	2	–	–	–	–	2
53	(Finland) Jouko Pöysti	–	–	–	–	–	–	–	–	2	–	–	0	2
53	(Italy) Michele Rayneri	–	–	–	–	–	–	–	–	–	2	–	–	2
53	(United Kingdom) Bertie Fisher	–	–	–	–	–	–	–	–	–	–	–	2	2
62	(Sweden) Jerry Åhlin	–	1	–	–	–	–	–	–	–	–	–	0	1
62	(United Kingdom) Russell Gooding	–	–	1	–	–	–	–	–	–	–	–	0	1
62	(Kenya) Basil Criticos	–	–	–	1	–	–	–	–	–	–	–	–	1
62	(France) Yves Loubet	0	–	–	–	1	–	–	–	–	–	–	–	1
62	(New Zealand) Blair Robson	–	–	–	–	–	–	1	–	–	–	–	–	1
62	(Argentina) Walter d'Agostini	–	–	–	–	–	–	–	1	–	–	–	–	1
62	(Finland) Kalevi Aho	–	–	–	–	–	–	–	–	1	–	–	–	1
62	(Austria) Werner Grissmann	–	–	0	–	–	–	–	–	–	1	–	–	1
62	(Sweden) Mikael Ericsson	–	0	–	–	–	–	–	–	0	–	–	1	1

=== Manufacturers' championship ===
Rank	Manufacturers	Event										Total points
Rank	Manufacturers	(Monaco) MON	(Portugal) POR	(Kenya) KEN	(France) FRA	(Greece) GRC	(New Zealand) NZL	(Argentina) ARG	(Finland) FIN	(Italy) ITA	(United Kingdom) GBR	Total points
1	(West Germany) Audi	18	18	14	(10)	18	18	18	–	–	16	120
2	(Italy) Lancia	(10)	16	12	18	14	16	–	16	16	–	108
3	(France) Peugeot	–	–	–	12	–	–	8	18	18	18	74
4	(Japan) Toyota	–	10	18	–	–	10	–	10	–	14	62
5	(France) Renault	12	10	–	14	–	–	15	4	–	–	55
6	(West Germany) Opel	–	–	16	2	–	–	11	2	7	10	48
7	(Japan) Nissan	2	–	10	–	8	12	–	6	–	8	46
8	(West Germany) Volkswagen	9	12	–	–	–	–	–	–	13	–	34
9	(Japan) Subaru	–	–	–	–	–	11	–	–	–	–	11
10	(Italy) Alfa Romeo	–	–	–	9	–	–	–	–	–	–	9
10	(Italy) Fiat	–	–	–	–	–	–	–	–	9	–	9
12	(United States) Ford	–	–	–	–	–	6	–	–	–	–	6
13	(France) Citroën	–	4	–	–	–	–	–	–	–	–	4
14	(United Kingdom) Vauxhall	–	2	–	–	–	–	–	–	–	–	2
14	(Japan) Mazda	–	–	–	–	2	–	–	–	–	–	2
14	(Japan) Mitsubishi	–	–	–	–	–	2	–	–	–	–	2

== Pointscoring systems ==
=== Drivers' championship ===
Points awarded by finish	1st	2nd	3rd	4th	5th	6th	7th	8th	9th	10th
Points awarded by finish	20	15	12	10	8	6	4	3	2	1

=== Manufacturers' championship ===
Overall finish	Group finish									
Overall finish	1	2	3	4	5	6	7	8	9	10
1	18	–	–	–	–	–	–	–	–	–
2	17	16	–	–	–	–	–	–	–	–
3	16	15	14	–	–	–	–	–	–	–
4	15	14	13	12	–	–	–	–	–	–
5	14	13	12	11	10	–	–	–	–	–
6	13	12	11	10	9	8	–	–	–	–
7	12	11	10	9	8	7	6	–	–	–
8	11	10	9	8	7	6	5	4	–	–
9	10	9	8	7	6	5	4	3	2	–
10	9	8	7	6	5	4	3	2	1	1
