= Michèle Mouton =

French rally driver (born 1951)

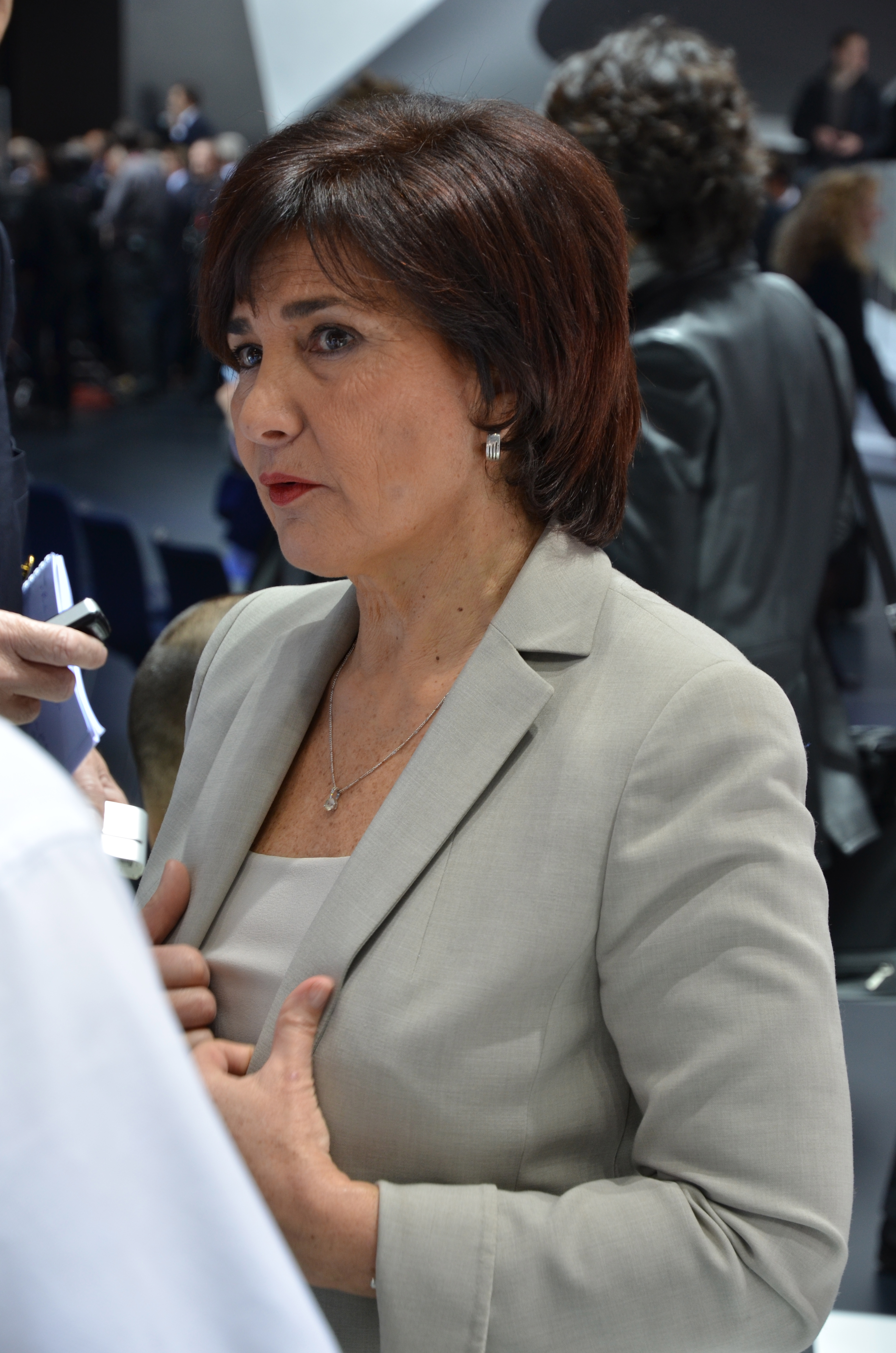
- Mouton in 2011

Personal information
- Full name: Michèle Hélène Raymonde Mouton
- Born: 23 June 1951 (age 75); Grasse, France

World Rally Championship record
- Years active: 1974–1986
- Co-driver: (France) Annie Arrii (France) Françoise Conconi (France) "Biche" (Italy) Fabrizia Pons (Sweden) Arne Hertz (United Kingdom) Terry Harryman
- Teams: Fiat, Audi, Peugeot
- Rallies: 50
- Championships: 0
- Rally wins: 4
- Podiums: 9
- Stage wins: 162
- Total points: 229
- First rally: 1974 Tour de Corse
- First win: 1981 Rallye Sanremo
- Last win: 1982 Rally Brazil
- Last rally: 1986 Tour de Corse

Michèle Hélène Raymonde Mouton (French pronunciation: [miʃɛl mutɔ̃]; born 23 June 1951) is a French former rally driver. Competing in the World Rally Championship for the Audi factory team, she took four victories and finished runner-up in the drivers' world championship in 1982.

Mouton debuted in rallying as a co-driver but quickly moved to the driver's seat, steering an Alpine-Renault A110 in national rallies. In 1975, she competed in circuit racing and won the two-litre prototype class in the 24 Hours of Le Mans. After being signed by Fiat France for 1977, Mouton finished runner-up to Bernard Darniche in the European Rally Championship. She went on to win the 1978 Tour de France Automobile and record consistent results in her home events in the WRC; the Tour de Corse and the Monte Carlo Rally. For 1981, Audi Sport signed Mouton to partner Hannu Mikkola. In her first year with the Audi Quattro, she took a surprise victory at the Rallye Sanremo.

In the 1982 World Rally season, Mouton finished a close second overall to Walter Röhrl, after wins in Portugal, Brazil and Greece, and helped Audi to its first manufacturers' title. Her campaign the following year resulted in fifth place. With the team having four top drivers for 1984, Mouton's participation on world championship level became part-time. In 1985, she won the Pikes Peak International Hill Climb in the United States, setting a record time in the process. In 1986, she moved to Peugeot and won the German Rally Championship as the first female driver to win a major championship in rallying. Soon after securing the title, Mouton retired from rallying due to the ban of Group B rally. In 1988, she co-founded the international motorsport event Race of Champions in memory of her former rival Henri Toivonen. Mouton became the first president of the FIA's Women in Motorsport Commission in 2010 and the FIA's manager in the World Rally Championship in 2011.

== Career ==
=== Early life and career ===
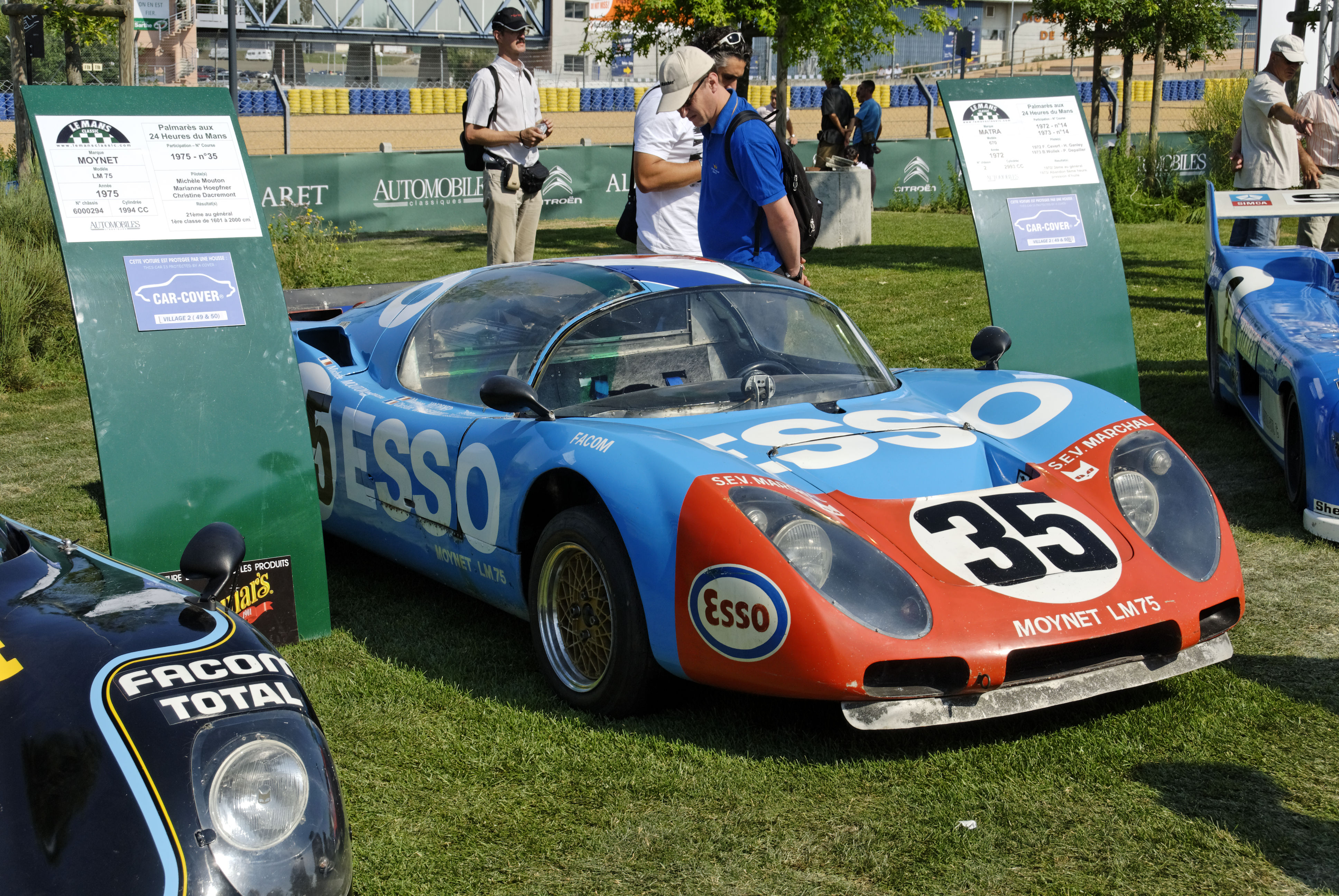
Mouton's 1975 Le Mans class-winning Moynet LM 75

Michèle Mouton was born 23 June 1951 in Grasse, a town on the French Riviera, close to the mountain stages famously featured in French rallies. Her parents grew roses and jasmine on their large property. After graduating from high school, Mouton began law studies, but would soon drop out and concentrate on a career in rallying. Although Mouton began driving her father's Citroën 2CV when she was 14 years old, she did not turn her interest to rallying until 1972, when her friend Jean Taibi asked her to practice the Tour de Corse with him. Mouton later co-drove for him in the 1973 Monte Carlo Rally, the first-ever World Rally Championship (WRC) event. After a few more rallies, Mouton's father suggested a switch to driving if she wanted to continue in rallying, and promised to buy her a car and give her one-year to prove herself. Driving an Alpine-Renault A110, she debuted at the Rallye Paris – Saint-Raphaël Féminin and then tackled the Tour de France Automobile. In the Île de Beauté, a complementary event to the Tour de Corse at the end of 1973, Mouton finished eighth overall.

In the World Rally Championship, Mouton made her driver debut in 1974, finishing 12th in the Tour de Corse in an Alpine A110. It was rumoured her good performances were the result of a special engine, however her car passed inspection by WRC scrutineers. At the end of the year, Mouton was crowned both French and European ladies' champion. Re-entering the Tour de Corse the following season, she took seventh place. Mouton successfully defended her ladies' titles, and also competed in circuit racing: In an all-female team with Christine Dacremont and Marianne Hoepfner, she won the two-litre prototype category of the 1975 24 Hours of Le Mans. Recalling the race in 2008, Mouton said: "It started to rain I remember, and I started to pass everybody. I was running on slicks. In the pits they were saying 'Michele you must stop', but I did not want to because I was passing everyone." Her results attracted a major sponsor in the form of the French oil company Elf. In 1976, Mouton drove the A110 to 11th place in Monte Carlo and retired at the Rallye Sanremo. At the Tour de Corse, her debut in the newer A310 also ended in retirement.

=== Fiat ===
For the 1977 season, Fiat France signed Mouton to partner Jean-Claude Andruet. She was not impressed by the handling of the Fiat 131 Abarth, stating it was "like a big truck, not a car" and "terrible to drive". However, the car would prove successful and Mouton put in very consistent results, finishing eighth in the Tour de Corse in 1977 and fifth three years in a row from 1978 to 1980. In 1980, she had been running as high as second before her engine died for a time. In Monte Carlo, she drove the car to seventh place in 1979 and 1980, equalling the result she had achieved in the event in a Lancia Stratos HF in 1978.

Outside the World Rally Championship, Mouton drove a Porsche Carrera RS to victory in the 1977 RACE Rallye de España and to second place in the 1977 Tour de France Automobile. She also finished runner-up to Bernard Darniche in the overall European Rally Championship (ERC). Mouton went on to win the Tour de France with the 131 Abarth the following year. At the Rallye d'Antibes, she finished third behind the Stratos drivers Darniche and Attilio Bettega. She placed fifth in the ERC standings and fourth in the Fédération Internationale de l'Automobile (FIA) Cup for Drivers, the predecessor to the drivers' world championship. In 1979, Mouton finished second in the French Rally Championship, behind Porsche 911 SC driver Bernard Béguin.

=== Audi ===
==== 1980 ====
In 1980, Audi Sport, Audi's new factory team, called Mouton and signed her for a World Rally Championship programme for the 1981 season. Mouton described Audi's call as "a complete shock". Audi's decision to nominate her instead of established male rivals attracted a great deal of publicity. As the Audi Quattro, the first rally car to have over 300 bhp and both a turbocharger and four-wheel-drive, had not yet gained FIA homologation, Audi could only enter rallies as zero cars and not as competitive entries. Hannu Mikkola debuted the car in the Algarve Rally in October, and would have won by about thirty minutes had his times been officially registered. Mouton joined Freddy Kottulinsky for the final round of the Finnish Rally Championship, the Northern Lights, and also showed encouraging pace on the slippery surfaces. Mouton initially found the car understeering, but became more comfortable after switching to left-foot braking, as advised by Mikkola who was in charge of developing the car. Audi announced their participation in eight events in 1981, although Mouton would not be entered in the Swedish Rally due to her lack of experience on driving on ice and snow.

==== 1981 ====
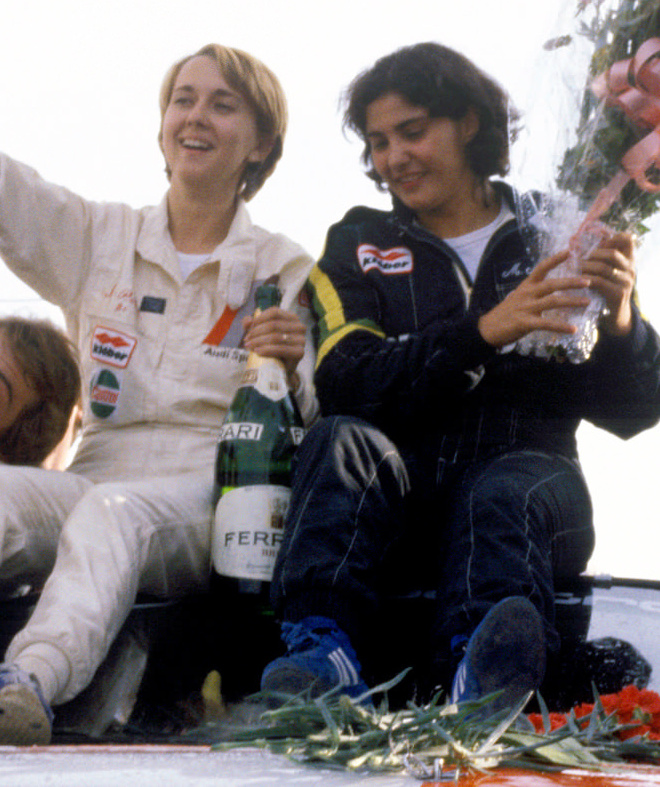
Mouton and Pons celebrate their first WRC victory in Sanremo.

Mouton's first competitive run in the Quattro in Monte Carlo ended before it had even begun. She withdrew from the event before the start due to apparent engine problems. The team later discovered that dirt had got into the fuel system. At the Rally Portugal, she started her long partnership with the Italian co-driver Fabrizia Pons. Mouton won seven stages and took a career-best fourth place, despite suffering from electronic problems. This ended criticism of Audi for signing a female driver. After a retirement due to a broken camshaft in the Tour de Corse, Mouton set several fastest times at the Acropolis Rally in Greece. While Mikkola was leading and Mouton fifth, the stewards excluded the Quattros citing homologation infractions. Although Audi protested, the stewards upheld the decision. In her debut in the high-speed 1000 Lakes Rally in Finland, Mouton found it hard to get used to the rhythm changes. She recorded a few top-ten stage times and finished 13th. She was satisfied with her performance, and the local newspaper Keskisuomalainen described her debut as successful. At the Rallye Sanremo in Italy, a mixed surface event with tarmac and gravel, Mouton took the lead when the local star Michele Cinotto crashed and she then held off Henri Toivonen and Ari Vatanen to take the victory. This marked the first time a female driver had won a world championship event in rallying. Mouton's male rivals were left speechless. Earlier during the weekend, Vatanen had been confident: "Never can nor will I lose to a woman." Mouton recalled her debut win in a 2008 interview for RallySport Magazine:

I remember not just because it was a win, but also because it was a big fight right into the last night. Fabrizia reminded me the other night that we had a problem with the brake pads, so we lost a lot of time. We finished three days rallying (with one day to go), night and day, 32 seconds in front of Ari Vatanen. We drove the last special stage for the night, came back to the hotel and I could not sleep at all, four hours in front of me and no sleep. Then I arrive at the special stage, it's about 42 km long, and I look at Fabrizia and I said "OK, we forget everything, and we are at the first stage of the rally again, because one of us will crash." And so Ari hit a rock, and we won the rally.

In the season-ending RAC Rally in Great Britain, Mouton continued her good performances by running third at half distance, despite having been uncomfortable about competing in a rally where pacenotes and practice are not allowed. However, her Quattro later incurred gearbox problems and she retired from fifth place after sliding off the road into a snow-filled ditch. Mouton would later state: "For me, rallying is England. No pacenotes – just you in the car having to do the fastest time. This, to me, is rallying. OK, it was not easy for me because I did not have experience there of the British championship, but it is really rallying. I like it very much." Mouton finished the season in eighth place in the drivers' championship, while Audi was fifth in the manufacturers' standings.

==== 1982 ====
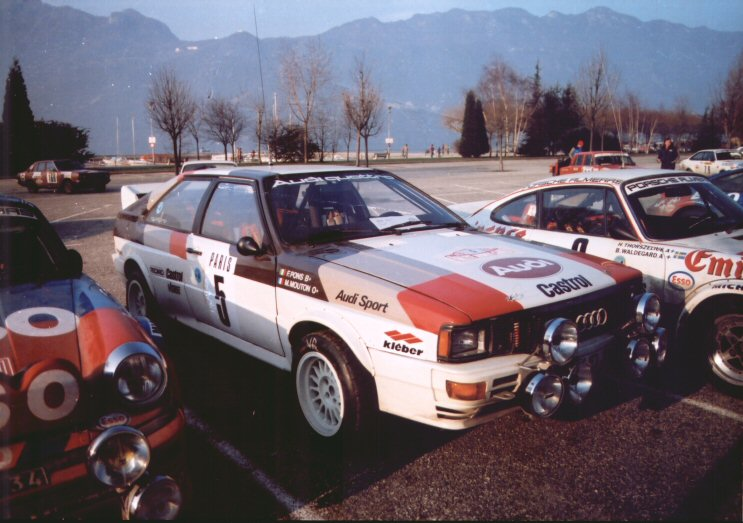
Mouton's Quattro in Monte Carlo, between two Porsche 911 SCs

Mouton's 1982 season started with a big accident at the Monte Carlo Rally. On stage twelve in the small town Briançonnet in Provence, she hit a patch of ice and slid off the road, crashing into the stone wall of a large house at 110 km/h (70 mph). Mouton injured her knee while Pons suffered a concussion. She had been in third place, and had set the fastest time for the difficult Col de Turini mountain pass. The pair's injuries were not serious and Mouton went on to make her debut in the Swedish Rally. She was running third when she slid into a snow bank, and crashed into the Quattro of teammate Hannu Mikkola who had gone off at the same place. She eventually finished fifth. In Portugal, Mouton recorded 18 stage wins on her way to a clear victory ahead of Toyota's Per Eklund. She once admitted that to be competitive in the rally, she tried to think of the large crowds right by the side of the route as trees. At the Tour de Corse, she could not match the pace of the leaders and finished seventh. At the Acropolis Rally, Mouton won ahead of the Opel duo Walter Röhrl and Henri Toivonen, and closed to within 20 points of the championship leader Röhrl. The event was overshadowed by two serious accidents, one of which killed a spectator. Mouton had commented: "I'm afraid that something might break in my car and I can no longer avoid hitting a spectator."

In New Zealand, Mouton continued her good performances and traded the lead with Mikkola, Röhrl and Björn Waldegård. Soon after regaining the lead on stage twelve, she retired with a broken oil pump. After seven rounds, Mouton was second in the championship, 32 points behind Röhrl and 12 ahead of Eklund. The Rally of Brazil was marred by the fatal accident of Brazilian driver Thomas Fuchs, and featured chaotic conditions as parts of the course were not successfully closed for competition. Although only five teams made it to the finish, Mouton improved her title hopes by winning her duel with Röhrl after the German lost a wheel on the last day. At the 1000 Lakes, she clocked in the eighth fastest time for the famous Ouninpohja stage and placed seventh after the first day. On the following leg, Mouton drove too fast into a jump and damaged her Quattro while landing. After the next jump, her front wheels locked up and she rolled the car. Mouton was next locked in a tight battle for the win in Sanremo. Although she recorded nine stage wins and Audi took a one-two, she had to settle for fourth behind Röhrl.

Audi had not originally planned to participate in the African marathon events, but now found it necessary to enter the penultimate round, the Rallye Côte d'Ivoire, due to their title battles with Opel. Just before the start of the event, Mouton received news that her father had succumbed to cancer in his house in Nice. His last wish was that Mouton start the rally. After a first day of over 1,200 kilometres (750 miles) of racing in temperatures over 30 °C (86 °F), she was eight minutes clear of Mikkola and nearly half an hour ahead of title rival Röhrl. Mikkola said that he had never been in such a hot car, and Röhrl estimated that the temperature inside his car reached an "almost unbearable" 70 °C (158 °F). With just over half of the 5,000 km (3,100 mi) behind, Mouton led from Röhrl by over an hour despite losing 25 minutes due to transmission problems. On the third day, both Mouton and Röhrl struggled with several reliability issues and her lead over Röhrl shrank to 18 minutes. The Toyota Celica GT2000s of Eklund and Waldegård were still over two hours behind. Should Mouton go on to hold off Röhrl, she would reduce Röhrl's lead in the championship to just two points. As a driver's seven best results counted towards the championship at the time, Mouton would only need a third place in the RAC Rally to take the title even if Röhrl would win. On the final day, she continued to suffer from mechanical problems and had the complete fuel injection system changed. For the next time control, Röhrl and Mouton arrived almost simultaneously. With only 600 km to go, Mouton went off the road and rolled her car. She drove the severely damaged Quattro for five more kilometres before giving up.

Röhrl inherited the win and became the first two-time world champion in rallying. Having lost her father, Mouton did not dwell on losing the title. Röhrl had earlier conceded that he "would have accepted second place in the championship to Mikkola", but not to Mouton: "This is not because I doubt her capabilities as a driver, but because she is a woman." He believed that defeat would have devalued his performances. At the RAC, Mouton edged out Toivonen to take second place behind Mikkola. This result made Audi the first German marque to win the manufacturers' world title. At the inaugural Autosport Awards gala, Mouton won the International Rally Driver of the Year award.

==== 1983 ====
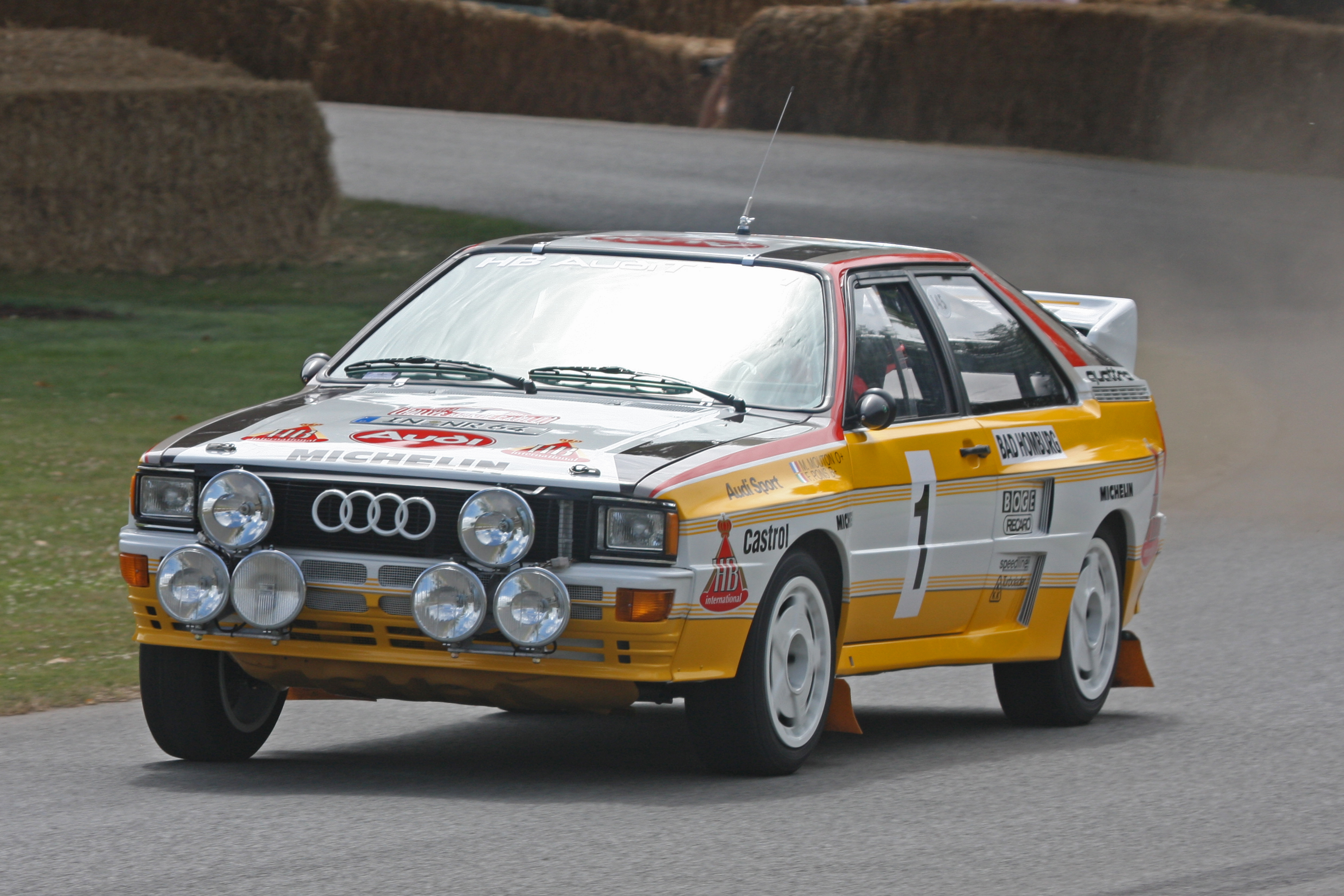
An ex-Mouton Quattro A2 at the 2009 Goodwood Festival of Speed

The 1983 season started the Group B era of the WRC and Mouton was now at the wheel of the Audi Quattro A1. She also had a new teammate; Audi had signed Stig Blomqvist as their third regular driver. For the third year in a row, Mouton had a bad start to her season in Monte Carlo. She went off the road on a stage not far from her home town, and again hit a stone wall at over 100 km/h (60 mph). The car was destroyed, but Mouton and Pons were unharmed. Mouton explained to her team boss Roland Gumpert, later of Gumpert supercar fame, that she had to dodge a photographer. Mouton went on to record successive points finishes. She finished fourth in Sweden in a quadruple win for Audi, after an early driving error that had sent her Quattro into a snow bank. In Portugal, Mouton finished second to Mikkola, ahead of Lancia's Röhrl and Markku Alén. After the first section of the Safari Rally, totaling over 1,600 km (1,000 mi), Mouton arrived to the finish on three wheels and said she was "totally exhausted" from the effort. She eventually placed third behind Opel's Ari Vatanen and her teammate Mikkola. After four events, Mikkola and Mouton were first and second in the drivers' championship.

At the Tour de Corse, Audi debuted the Quattro A2, which was 70 kg (155 lb) lighter and had an engine producing 30 more horsepower. Mouton's rally ended when her engine caught on fire. On the first stage in Greece, she rolled her car on a hairpin turn 18 km (11 mi) from the start. Rally New Zealand was for Mouton a repetition of the previous year; she took the lead on the seventh stage and held on to it until her A2's engine failed, with only six of the 33 stages to go. The three retirements in a row dropped Mouton to fifth place in the championship. She then finished third behind Mikkola and Blomqvist at the Rally Argentina, but this would remain her last podium finish of the season. At the 1000 Lakes in Finland, Mouton finished the first day in seventh place after setting two top-five stage times. Her car later caught on fire, but she was able to continue in the event by following Mikkola's advice and driving into a lake. With a string of top-ten times, she eventually finished 16th. In the Rallye Sanremo, the tarmac stages were dominated by the Lancia 037 and Mouton finished seventh after suffering from fuel injection problems. In the season-ending RAC Rally, she started well and held second place after the first twelve stages. An Audi mechanic later accidentally refilled Mouton's fuel tank with pure water which resulted in time-consuming repairs. She eventually retired after crashing out, and placed fifth overall in the drivers' championship. Although Mikkola beat Lancia's Röhrl and Alén to the drivers' title, Audi had lost the manufacturers' title to Lancia after the latter's triple win in Sanremo.

==== 1984 ====
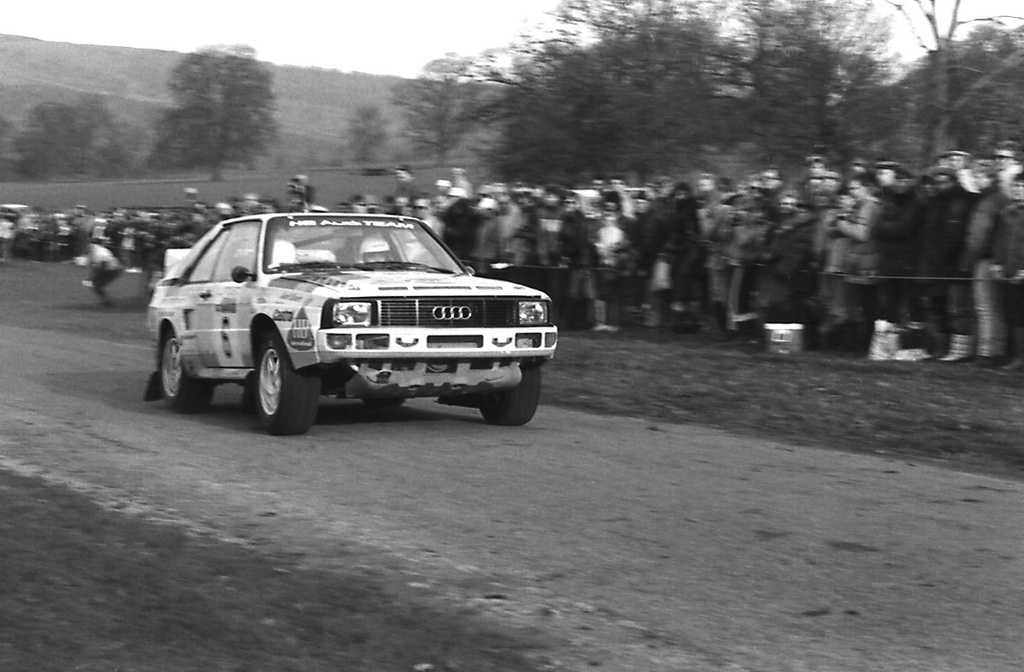
Mouton with a Sport Quattro at the RAC

For the 1984 season, Audi added two-time world champion Walter Röhrl to their star line-up and Mouton now had a part-time role, competing in five WRC events. For the first time in nine years, she did not enter the Monte Carlo Rally. However, Mouton signed up to commentate the event for Radio Monte Carlo. She started her year well by finishing second at the Swedish Rally behind teammate and home favourite Blomqvist. Mouton later stated that "finishing second was fantastic. When you are out rallying on ice or snow in country like that it is like dancing. From one side to the other side. My dancing background helped my rallying. As soon as I started on gravel I liked it because of that. It was so nice to feel and move the car like that. Sweden, in ice and snow, like ballet!" This would remain her last podium position in the World Rally Championship.

In the Safari Rally, a rotor arm in Mouton's Quattro failed and caused the turbo to break down as well. She retired after falling victim to the team's ranking order; as the repairs were expected to take too long, Gumpert ordered championship leader Blomqvist's Quattro to be fixed by using Mouton's sister car as spares. Her debut in the new Sport Quattro at the Acropolis Rally ended with engine overheating problems. In the 1000 Lakes, Mouton placed ninth after the short first day. She later crashed and continued without a windscreen, but the damage to her Quattro could not be repaired in service. Mouton retired and left Finland pointless for the fourth year in a row. In late October, she signed a contract extension with Audi. At the RAC Rally, a slight mistake led to a puncture and Mouton dropped from third to fifth. She went on to narrowly lose the final podium spot to Toyota's Per Eklund. Mouton's results placed her 12th in the drivers' world championship, a point behind Röhrl. Outside the WRC, Mouton debuted in the Pikes Peak International Hill Climb in the United States, driving an Audi Sport Quattro together with her usual co-driver Fabrizia Pons. After her main opponent Martin Schanche got hampered by a flat right front tyre she won the open rally category (now known as unlimited) in a record time and placed second overall, leaving behind several specialised V8 single-seaters that had normally dominated the race.

==== 1985 ====
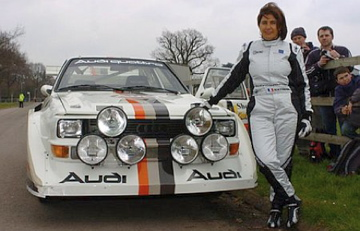
Mouton with a Quattro S1 in 2007

Audi's WRC programme was limited for the 1985 season due to the recent defeats to Peugeot Talbot Sport, Peugeot's factory team headed by Jean Todt. Mouton and Mikkola were assigned to testing and development duties. She drove both the Sport Quattro and its follower, the Quattro S1 (Sport E2). Mouton considered the S1 the most difficult rally car she had driven: "For rallying on asphalt, I agree the limit had gone too far. We did not have the reflexes to control it properly. It was tough to drive the car, but not the short Quattro before."

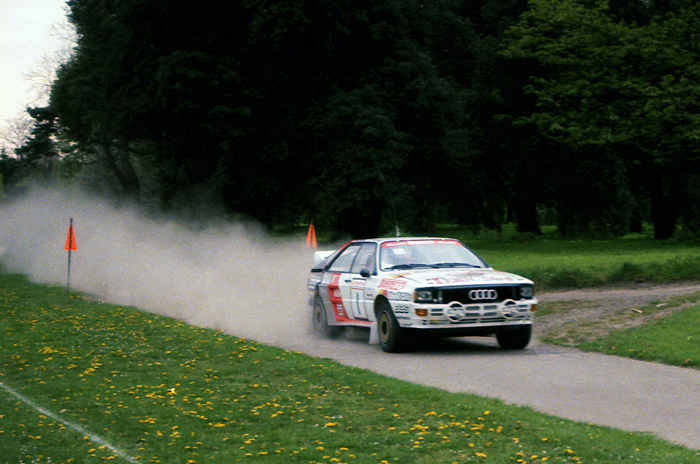
Mouton in an A2 at the Welsh Rally

Although Mouton competed in only one world championship event during the season, she contested a full six-round British Rally Championship. Her campaign was plagued by reliability problems and she recorded only one finish. In the National Breakdown Rally, Mouton stopped after damaging her Quattro in a jump. After technical problems led to an early retirement at the Circuit of Ireland, she finished second at the Welsh Rally behind Malcolm Wilson in another Quattro. At the Scottish Rally, Mouton had been closing in on the leading Wilson until a transmission problem forced her to retire. At the Ulster Rally, she set the fastest time for the first stage but then dropped out with a mechanical failure. In the season-ending Manx International Rally, Mouton struggled to start her Quattro and then crashed out five stages later.

Mouton's only WRC event of the year was the long-distance Rallye Côte d'Ivoire. She was co-driven by Arne Hertz as Pons was ill at the time of the start. Mouton started well and tied the lead with Toyota's Juha Kankkunen after the first day. Her Quattro incurred severe engine problems on the next day, but was seemingly repaired by Audi mechanics off the route in the jungle. At the same time, the Sport Quattro "chase car", a high-speed service car, retired and Audi faced accusations of swapping the cars. The team withdrew Mouton just before the finish and the controversy remains unresolved; the stewards did not find proof but the media published evidence afterwards. Although her rallying year was a disappointment, Mouton made a successful return to the Pikes Peak, winning the event overall in her Sport Quattro. Despite slippery conditions caused by a hailstorm, she broke Al Unser Jr.'s 1982 record by about thirteen seconds. The Frenchwoman's win irritated some of her male rivals. Bobby Unser was reputedly quite vocal about his loss, to which Mouton is said to have replied: "If you have the balls you can try to race me back down as well."

=== Peugeot ===
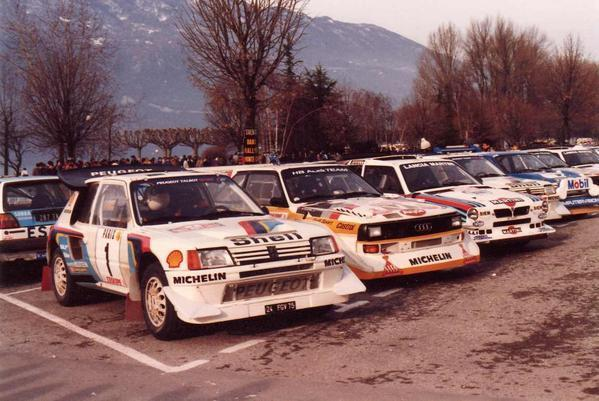
Mouton's teammate Timo Salonen's 205 T16 E2 in Monte Carlo

Mouton broke off her contract with Audi in late 1985 to join Peugeot for the coming season. She contested the German Rally Championship and two WRC events in a Peugeot 205 Turbo 16, with which the marque had captured the previous year's world titles. To replace the newly-wed Pons, Mouton recruited Terry Harryman who had been left jobless after Ari Vatanen's accident. Mouton, nicknamed "der schwarze Vulkan" (The Black Volcano) due to her temperament and long black hair, won six of the eight events in the German championship, including the Rallye Deutschland. Although the Hessen Rallye was stopped after the severe accident of Formula One driver Marc Surer, which claimed the life of his co-driver Michel Wyder, Mouton was declared the winner. She secured the German national title on the seventh and penultimate round, the Sachs Baltic, after taking her fifth win of the season. She became the first female driver to win a major championship in rallying.

Mouton's WRC outings were her home events: Monte Carlo Rally and Tour de Corse. In Monte Carlo, she was running in eighth place after eleven stages, but soon retired with oil pump problems. For the Tour de Corse in May, Mouton was given the second evolution of the car. She quickly showed good pace and held third place behind Lancia's Henri Toivonen and teammate Bruno Saby. However, she ran into gearbox trouble on the tenth stage and was forced to retire. During the next day, Toivonen and his co-driver Sergio Cresto crashed out from the lead and died in their seats. Mouton was still in Corsica and remarked to her boyfriend that "if they stop the Group B now, it will be the end for me." Within days, FISA announced new regulations and banned the Group B supercars for the following year.

In October, two weeks after securing the German Rally Championship title, Mouton announced her retirement from rallying. She cited the end of the Group B era as the reason behind the decision, and stated that it was "a good time to stop". Later in the same month, Mouton crowned her career by winning the last event of the German championship, the Drei-Städte-Rallye (Three Cities Rally), ahead of Armin Schwarz's MG Metro 6R4.

=== Later career ===
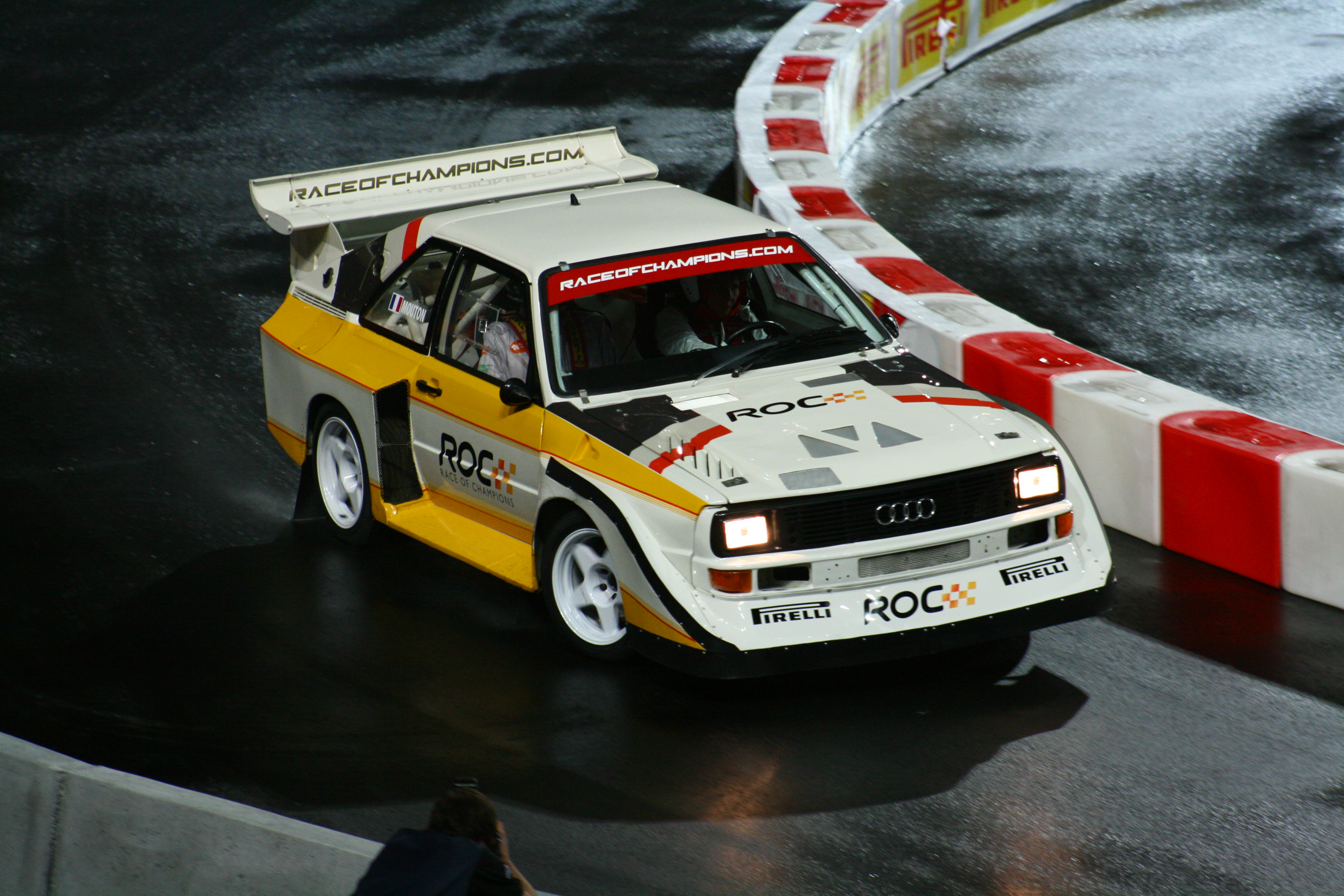
Mouton driving a Quattro S1 during the 2009 edition of the Race of Champions

In 1988, Mouton co-founded the international motorsport event Race of Champions with Fredrik Johnsson, in memory of Toivonen and to celebrate the tenth anniversary of the world championship for rally drivers. The event originally included the world's top rally drivers, but now features stars also from other disciplines, such as Formula One, NASCAR, Le Mans and MotoGP, competing against each other in identical cars.

In 1988 and 1989, Mouton participated in rally raids as part of Peugeot's service team for Ari Vatanen and Jacky Ickx. At the 1988 Rally of Tunisia, Mouton drove a 205 T16 Grand Raid chase car and transported spare parts for Vatanen and Henri Pescarolo, but also classified sixth overall. She later took part in the Dakar Rally as a press driver in 2004 and 2009. In 2000, Mouton finished second in the London–Sydney Marathon driving a Porsche 911, behind former teammate Stig Blomqvist. After 22 years, Mouton and Fabrizia Pons reunited to compete in the 2008 Otago Classic Rally in New Zealand. In 2010, Mouton competed with a 911 in the Rallye du Maroc and finished second to Grégoire De Mévius.

In 2010, Mouton became the first president of the FIA's Women & Motor Sport Commission. She stated that "for many years people have asked me why there have been no women following in my footsteps. I really hope the Commission can help answer that question and that we can attract and support women in all areas of our sport." Having already headed a working group on the future of rallying, Mouton was appointed FIA's manager in the World Rally Championship in 2011. Mouton also serves in the nomination committee of the Rally Hall of Fame. In March 2012, she recused herself after becoming a candidate for nomination. Mouton was inducted into the Hall of Fame along with two-time world champion Carlos Sainz.

== Personal life and legacy ==
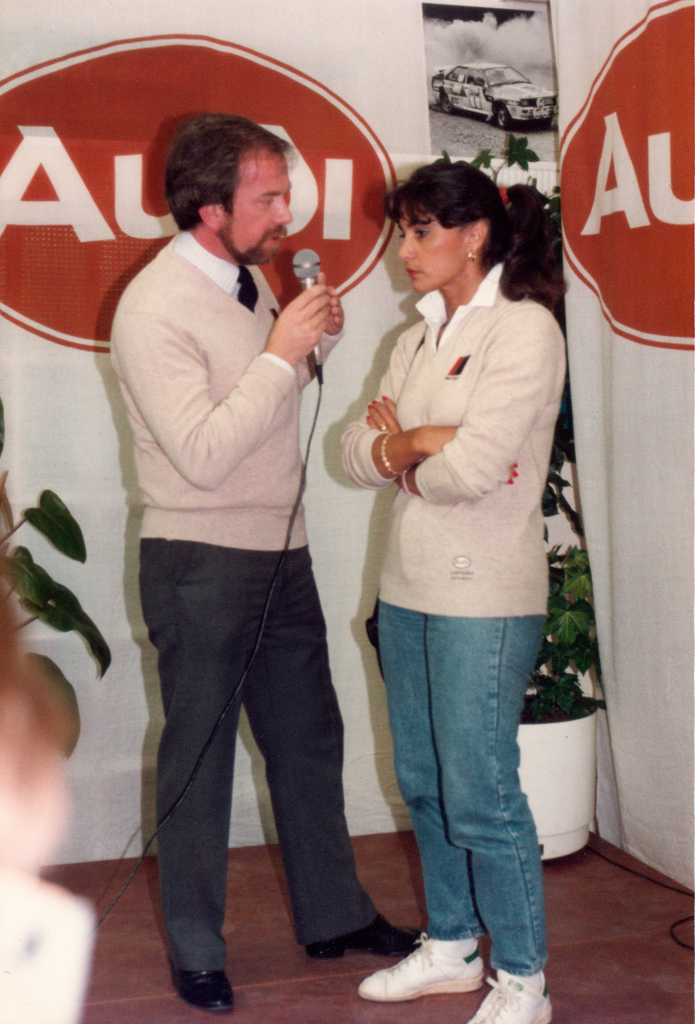
Mouton interviewed in 1985

While announcing her retirement from rallying, Mouton stated her intention to start a family with Corsican sports journalist Claude Guarnieri. She had her daughter Jessie (Jessica) in 1987. Mouton credited her father Pierre's support as the secret for her success: "He loved driving. He loved fast cars. And I think he would have loved to do what I did. He was a prisoner of war for five years and when he came back he never had the opportunity to compete. But he came to all the rallies I did. And my mother came, too."

Mouton states that in her mind she did not try to beat her male rivals, but to be at their level. She noted that in rallying, time is the most important thing. David Evans of Autosport described her as "motorsport's most successful ever female driver". Rally journalist and historian Graham Robson credits Mouton, along with Pat Moss, as "the driver by whom all other females measure their skills and achievements". Mouton and Moss were of different eras and did not compete directly against each other, although they both appeared at the 1973 Monte Carlo Rally where Mouton co-drove. In 1985, they swapped cars in a private test session with Moss driving the Quattro and Mouton an Austin-Healey 3000. Stirling Moss regarded Mouton as "one of the best", and Niki Lauda described her as a "superwoman".

In 2011, Mouton was made knight of the Legion of Honour (Légion d'honneur) by French President Nicolas Sarkozy. At the 50th International Emmy Awards in 2022, the documentary Queen of Speed about Mouton's rise to the top of rallying in the 1980s was awarded an Emmy for the Best Sports Documentary.

In 2024, Mouton was awarded the first ever FIA lifetime achievement award.

== WRC victories ==
Nº	Year	Rally	Co-driver	Car
1.	1981	(Italy) Rallye Sanremo	(Italy) Fabrizia Pons	Audi Quattro
2.	1982	Rally de Portugal	(Italy) Fabrizia Pons	Audi Quattro
3.	1982	(Greece) Acropolis Rally	(Italy) Fabrizia Pons	Audi Quattro
4.	1982	Rally of Brazil	(Italy) Fabrizia Pons	Audi Quattro

== Complete WRC results ==
Year	Entrant	Car	1	2	3	4	5	6	7	8	9	10	11	12	13	WDC	Points
1974	Michèle Mouton	Alpine-Renault A110 1800	POR	KEN	FIN	ITA	CAN	USA	GBR	FRA; 12						N/A^{[A]}	N/A
1975	Michèle Mouton	Alpine-Renault A110 1800	MON	SWE	KEN	GRC	MAR	POR	FIN	ITA	FRA; 7	GBR				N/A^{[A]}	N/A
1976	Michèle Mouton	Alpine-Renault A110 1800	MON; 11	SWE	POR	KEN	GRC	MAR	FIN	ITA; Ret						N/A^{[A]}	N/A
1976	Michèle Mouton	Alpine-Renault A310 V6									FRA; Ret	GBR				N/A^{[A]}	N/A
1977	Michèle Mouton	Autobianchi A112 Abarth	MON; 24	SWE	POR	KEN	NZL	GRC	FIN	CAN	ITA					N/A^{[B]}	N/A
1977	Michèle Mouton	Fiat 131 Abarth										FRA; 8	GBR			N/A^{[B]}	N/A
1978	Michèle Mouton	Lancia Stratos HF	MON; 7	SWE	KEN	POR	GRC	FIN	CAN	ITA	CIV					N/A^{[B]}	N/A
1978	Michèle Mouton	Fiat 131 Abarth										FRA; 5	GBR			N/A^{[B]}	N/A
1979	Fiat France	Fiat 131 Abarth	MON; 7	SWE	POR	KEN	GRC	NZL	FIN	CAN	ITA	FRA; 5	GBR	CIV		21st	12
1980	Fiat France	Fiat 131 Abarth	MON; 7	SWE	POR	KEN	GRC	ARG	FIN	NZL	ITA	FRA; 5	GBR	CIV		23rd	12
1981	Audi Sport	Audi Quattro	MON; Ret	SWE	POR; 4	KEN	FRA; Ret	GRC; Ret	ARG	BRA	FIN; 13	ITA; 1	CIV	GBR; Ret		8th	30
1982	Audi Sport	Audi Quattro	MON; Ret	SWE; 5	POR; 1	KEN	FRA; 7	GRC; 1	NZL; Ret	BRA; 1	FIN; Ret	ITA; 4	CIV; Ret	GBR; 2		2nd	97
1983	Audi Sport	Audi Quattro A1	MON; Ret	SWE; 4	POR; 2	KEN; 3										5th	53
1983	Audi Sport	Audi Quattro A2					FRA; Ret	GRC; Ret	NZL; Ret	ARG; 3	FIN; 16	ITA; 7	CIV	GBR; Ret		5th	53
1984	HB Audi Team	Audi Quattro A2	MON	SWE; 2	POR	KEN; Ret	FRA									12th	25
1984	HB Audi Team	Audi Sport Quattro						GRC; Ret	NZL	ARG	FIN; Ret	ITA	CIV	GBR; 4		12th	25
1985	HB Audi Team	Audi Sport Quattro	MON	SWE	POR	KEN	FRA	GRC	NZL	ARG	FIN	ITA	CIV; Ret	GBR		NC	0
1986	Peugeot Talbot Deutschland	Peugeot 205 Turbo 16	MON; Ret	SWE	POR	KEN										NC	0
1986	Shell Peugeot Talbot Sport	Peugeot 205 Turbo 16 E2					FRA; Ret	GRC	NZL	ARG	FIN	CIV	ITA	GBR	USA	NC	0

=== Complete 24 Hours of Le Mans results ===
Year	Team	Co-Drivers	Car	Class	Laps	Pos.	Class Pos.
1975	(France) Société Esso	(France) Christine Dacremont (France) Marianne Hoepfner	Moynet LM75 Simca	S 2.0	270	21st	1st

=== Notes ===
^{A} From the World Rally Championship's conception in 1973 until 1976, there was no championship for drivers. Only a manufacturers' championship was awarded.
^{B} For the 1977 and 1978 seasons, the FIA Cup for Drivers was awarded. This took into account all of the WRC events, and ten events that were not part of the WRC.

== See also ==
- List of female World Rally Championship drivers

== Sources ==
- Collins, Peter (2008). Lancia 037: The Development & Rally History of a World Champion. Veloce Publishing Ltd. ISBN 9781845840761.
- Davenport, John; Hope-Frost, Henry (2004). The Complete Book of the World Rally Championship. Motorbooks International. ISBN 9780760319543.
- Robson, Graham (2008). Audi Quattro. Veloce Publishing Ltd. ISBN 9781845841416.
