= 1983 World Rally Championship =

11th season of the FIA World Rally Championship

Champions
- World Drivers' Champion: Hannu Mikkola
- World Manufacturers' Champion: Lancia

Seasons
- ← 1982 1984 →

The 1983 World Rally Championship was the 11th season of the Fédération Internationale de l'Automobile (FIA) World Rally Championship (WRC). The season consisted of 12 rallies. By this time, the schedule format had become generally stable, with only one or two changes to venues year to year. 1983 brought the return of Argentina to the schedule in place of Brazil. Audi's Hannu Mikkola beat the defending world champion Walter Röhrl and his Lancia teammate Markku Alén to the drivers' title. Lancia captured the manufacturers' title from Audi by just two points.

== Summary ==
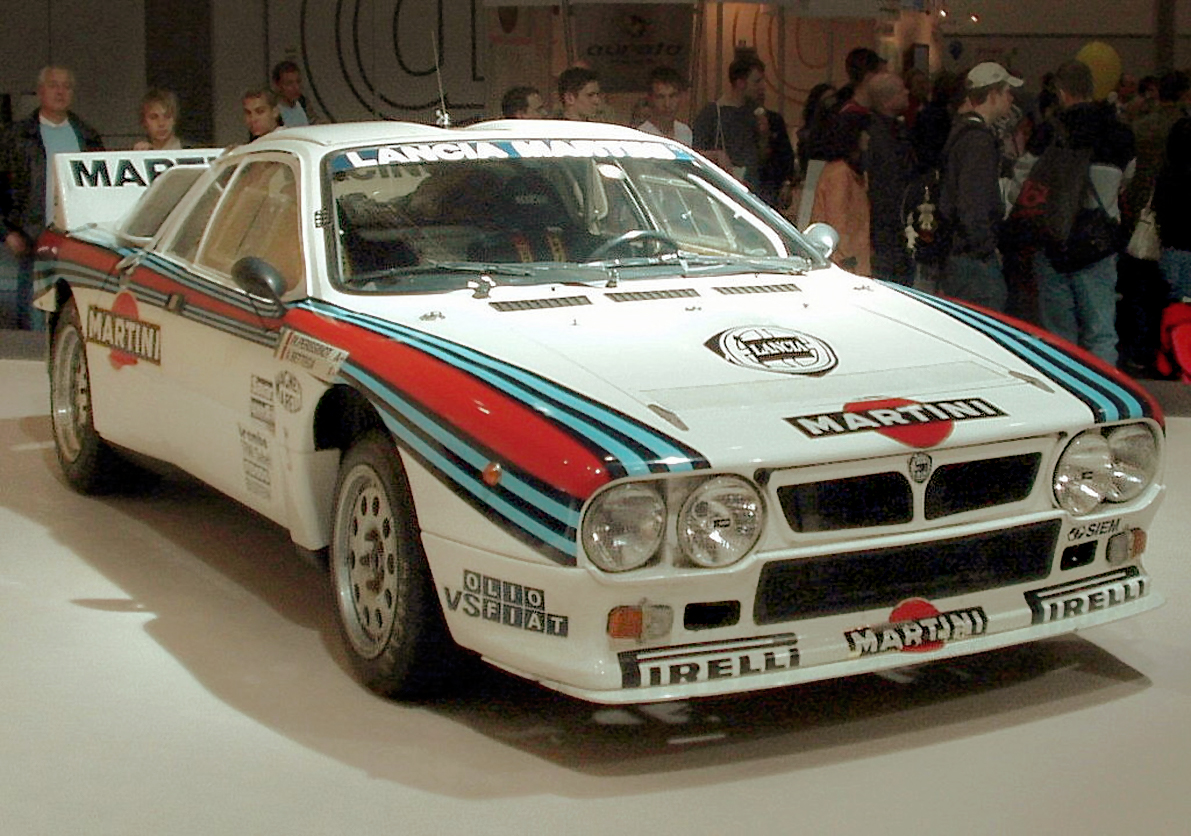
An ex-Bettega Lancia 037 Rally

German Walter Röhrl, champion of the previous year despite his manufacturer's failed bid to capture the title, was tapped to drive for the Martini Racing team along with Finn Markku Alén in the new Lancia Rally 037 car. Audi Sport meanwhile carried forward from its successful title run in 1982 led by the same pair of drivers, Finn Hannu Mikkola and Frenchwoman Michèle Mouton, equipped with the Quattro A1 (later in the season upgrading to the A2 model). The team also included future champion Swede Stig Blomqvist. Rothmans Opel Rally Team tapped former champion Finn Ari Vatanen and fellow countryman Henri Toivonen to drive the Ascona 400 during the season.

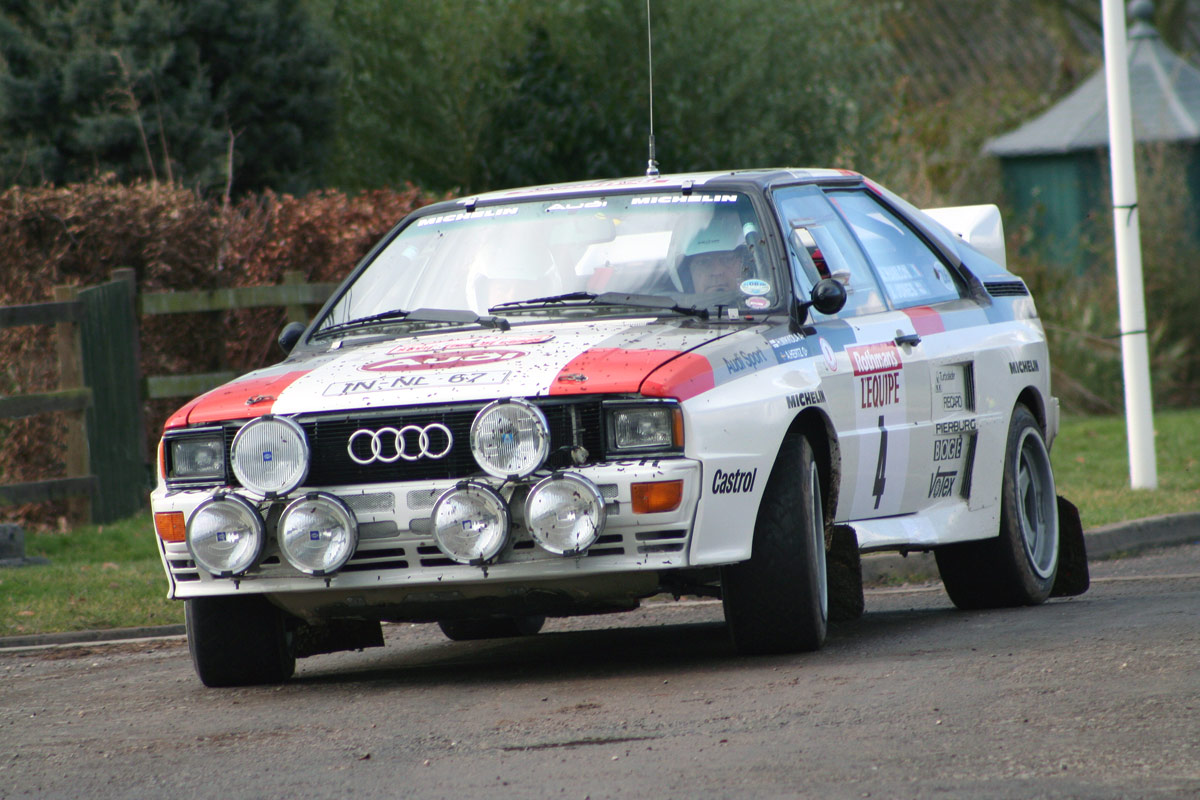
An ex-Mikkola Audi Quattro A2

Competition was fierce both for drivers and manufacturers. The works battle quickly centered on the Audi and Lancia, and over the course of the season the two cars won 10 of the 12 events and sit on 30 of the year's 36 podium positions. Lancia emerged on top, returning the manufacturer to glory for the first time since the company seized three consecutive titles in the mid-1970s, despite deciding not to participate in last two events. Audi's performance was impressive and the car was improved in the second half of the season, winning three of the final four events to nearly catch the Italian maker (who, of course, withdrew from two last events, leaving Audi with little competition).

Driver competition was no less intense, with both of the Martini team-mates scoring well through the season. They were outpaced by Mikkola, who was able to garner four wins and seven podiums to take the title by a healthy margin in the end. While Mikkola appeared in all events, Röhrl and Alén only appeared in six and seven events respectively, which gave Mikkola clear path to the title. Mikkola teammate Blomqvist was impressive, finally winning in the last event of the year to place fourth overall, but Mouton's season was a disappointment, her fifth-place finish well off the pace. The Rothmans team meanwhile suffered an unimpressive season, the lone highlight being Vatanen's win in Kenya. This was the team's only podium finish, and Ari himself finished a distant sixth place on the year.

As with previous seasons, while all 12 events were calculated for tallying the drivers' scores, only 10 of the events applied to the championship for manufacturers. The two events in 1983 that applied only to driver standings were Sweden and the Rallye Côte d'Ivoire.

== Calendar ==
Rd.	Start date	Finish date	Rally	Rally headquarters	Surface	Stages	Distance	Points
1	22 January	28 January	(Monaco) 51st Rallye Automobile Monte-Carlo	Monte Carlo	Mixed	31	776.80 km	Drivers & Manufacturers
2	11 February	13 February	(Sweden) 33rd International Swedish Rally	Karlstad, Värmland County	Snow	25	476.10 km	Drivers only
3	2 March	5 March	17th Rallye de Portugal - Vinho do Porto	Estoril, Lisbon	Mixed	43	671.39 km	Drivers & Manufacturers
4	30 March	4 April	(Kenya) 31st Marlboro Safari Rally	Nairobi	Gravel	N/A	5035 km	Drivers & Manufacturers
5	5 May	7 May	27th Tour de Corse - Rallye de France	Ajaccio, Corsica	Tarmac	32	1066.10 km	Drivers & Manufacturers
6	30 May	2 June	(Greece) 30th Rothmans Acropolis Rally	Athens	Gravel	46	843.30 km	Drivers & Manufacturers
7	25 June	28 June	14th Sanyo Rally of New Zealand	Auckland	Gravel	33	1071.09 km	Drivers & Manufacturers
8	2 August	6 August	3rd Marlboro Rally Argentina	Buenos Aires	Gravel	18	1275.29 km	Drivers & Manufacturers
9	26 August	28 August	(Finland) 33rd Rally of the 1000 Lakes	Jyväskylä, Central Finland	Gravel	50	472.63 km	Drivers & Manufacturers
10	2 October	7 October	(Italy) 25th Rallye Sanremo	Sanremo, Liguria	Mixed	58	775.89 km	Drivers & Manufacturers
11	25 October	30 October	(Ivory Coast) 15th Rallye Cote d'Ivoire	Abidjan	Gravel	N/A	4498 km	Drivers only
12	19 November	22 November	(United Kingdom) 39th Lombard RAC Rally	Bath, Somerset	Gravel	59	835.33 km	Drivers & Manufacturers

== Teams and drivers ==
Team	Constructor	Car	Tyre	Drivers	Rounds
(Italy) Martini Racing	Lancia	Rally 037	P	(Germany) Walter Röhrl	1, 3, 5–7, 10
(Italy) Martini Racing	Lancia	Rally 037	P	(Finland) Markku Alén	1, 3, 5–6, 8–10
(Italy) Martini Racing	Lancia	Rally 037	P	(France) Jean-Claude Andruet	1, 5
(Italy) Martini Racing	Lancia	Rally 037	P	(Italy) Adartico Vudafieri	3, 8
(Italy) Martini Racing	Lancia	Rally 037	P	(Italy) Attilio Bettega	5–7, 10
(Italy) Martini Racing	Lancia	Rally 037	P	(Argentina) Francisco Mayorga	8
(Italy) Martini Racing	Lancia	Rally 037	P	(Finland) Pentti Airikkala	9
(Germany) Audi Sport	Audi	Quattro A1; Quattro A2	M P	(Finland) Hannu Mikkola	All
(Germany) Audi Sport	Audi	Quattro A1; Quattro A2	M P	(France) Michèle Mouton	1–10, 12
(Germany) Audi Sport	Audi	Quattro A1; Quattro A2	M P	(Sweden) Stig Blomqvist	1–3, 6–10, 12
(Germany) Audi Sport	Audi	Quattro A1; Quattro A2	M P	(Finland) Lasse Lampi	2, 9, 11–12
(Germany) Audi Sport	Audi	Quattro A1; Quattro A2	M P	(Austria) Franz Wittmann	3, 6
(Germany) Audi Sport	Audi	Quattro A1; Quattro A2	M P	(Kenya) Vic Preston Jr	4
(Germany) Audi Sport	Audi	Quattro A1; Quattro A2	M P	(Kenya) Shekhar Mehta	8
(Germany) Audi Sport	Audi	Quattro A1; Quattro A2	M P	(Argentina) Rubén Luis di Palma	8
(Germany) Audi Sport	Audi	Quattro A1; Quattro A2	M P	(Sweden) Per Eklund	9
(Germany) Audi Sport	Audi	Quattro A1; Quattro A2	M P	(France) Bernard Darniche	10
(Germany) Audi Sport	Audi	Quattro A1; Quattro A2	M P	(United States) John Buffum	12
(Germany) Rothmans Opel Rally Team	Opel	Ascona 400; Manta 400	M	(Finland) Ari Vatanen	1–2, 4, 6, 9–10, 12
(Germany) Rothmans Opel Rally Team	Opel	Ascona 400; Manta 400	M	(Finland) Henri Toivonen	1, 6, 9–10, 12
(Germany) Rothmans Opel Rally Team	Opel	Ascona 400; Manta 400	M	(France) Guy Frequelin	1, 5
(Germany) Rothmans Opel Rally Team	Opel	Ascona 400; Manta 400	M	(Finland) Rauno Aaltonen	4
(Germany) Rothmans Opel Rally Team	Opel	Ascona 400; Manta 400	M	(United Kingdom) Jimmy McRae	6, 12
(Germany) Rothmans Opel Rally Team	Opel	Ascona 400; Manta 400	M	(United Kingdom) Phil Colins	12
(Germany) Rothmans Opel Rally Team	Opel	Ascona 400; Manta 400	M	(United Kingdom) Clinton Smith	12
(Germany) Rothmans Opel Rally Team	Opel	Ascona 400; Manta 400	M	(United Kingdom) Alastair Sutherland	12
(Germany) Rothmans Opel Rally Team	Opel	Ascona 400; Manta 400	M	(United Kingdom) Alex Jackson	12
(France) Renault Elf	Renault	5 Turbo	M	(France) Jean Ragnotti	1, 5–6
(France) Renault Elf	Renault	5 Turbo	M	(France) Jean-Luc Thérier	1, 3, 5
(France) Renault Elf	Renault	5 Turbo	M	(France) Bruno Saby	1, 5
(France) Renault Elf	Renault	5 Turbo	M	(France) Dany Snobeck	1
(France) Renault Elf	Renault	5 Turbo	M	(France) Philippe Touren	1, 5
(France) Renault Elf	Renault	5 Turbo	M	(France) Gilbert Sau	1
(France) Renault Elf	Renault	5 Turbo	M	(Portugal) Manuel Pereira	3
(France) Renault Elf	Renault	5 Turbo	M	(France) François Chatriot	5
(France) Renault Elf	Renault	5 Turbo	M	(France) Jean-Pierre Manzagol	5
(Japan) Team Nissan Europe	Nissan	240RS	D	(Finland) Timo Salonen	1, 3–4, 6–7, 9, 12
(Japan) Team Nissan Europe	Nissan	240RS	D	(United Kingdom) Terry Kaby	3
(Japan) Team Nissan Europe	Nissan	240RS	D	(Kenya) Shekhar Mehta	4, 6–7
(Japan) Team Nissan Europe	Nissan	240RS	D	(Kenya) Mike Kirkland	4
(Japan) Team Nissan Europe	Nissan	240RS	D	(Kenya) Jayant Shah	4
(Japan) Team Nissan Europe	Nissan	240RS	D	(United Kingdom) Tony Pond	5
(Japan) Team Nissan Europe	Nissan	240RS	D	(Greece) George Moschous	6
(Japan) Team Nissan Europe	Nissan	240RS	D	(New Zealand) Reg Cook	7
(Japan) Team Nissan Europe	Nissan	240RS	D	(Finland) Erkki Pitkänen	9
(Japan) Team Nissan Europe	Nissan	240RS	D	(Finland) Peter Geitel	12
(United Kingdom) Automobiles Talbot	Talbot	Sunbeam Lotus	M	(United Kingdom) Chris Lord	1
(United Kingdom) Automobiles Talbot	Talbot	Sunbeam Lotus	M	(Spain) Antonio Zanini	3
(United Kingdom) Automobiles Talbot	Talbot	Sunbeam Lotus	M	(United States) Jon Woodner	12
(United Kingdom) Automobiles Talbot	Talbot	Sunbeam Lotus	M	(United Kingdom) David Keating	12
(United Kingdom) Automobiles Talbot	Talbot	Sunbeam Lotus	M	(France) Alain Truchet	12
(United Kingdom) Automobiles Talbot	Talbot	Sunbeam Lotus	M	(United Kingdom) Colin Barrell	12
(France) Citroën Compétitions	Citroën	Visa	M	(France) Maurice Chomat	1, 3, 6, 12
(France) Citroën Compétitions	Citroën	Visa	M	(France) Alain Coppier	1, 3, 5–6, 9–10, 12
(France) Citroën Compétitions	Citroën	Visa	M	(France) Christian Dorche	1–3, 5–6, 12
(France) Citroën Compétitions	Citroën	Visa	M	(Portugal) Francisco Romãozinho	3
(France) Citroën Compétitions	Citroën	Visa	M	(France) Philippe Wambergue	3, 6, 12
(France) Citroën Compétitions	Citroën	Visa	M	(France) Christian Rio	3, 6, 12
(France) Citroën Compétitions	Citroën	Visa	M	(France) Olivier Tabatoni	3, 5–6, 9
(France) Citroën Compétitions	Citroën	Visa	M	(Portugal) Rufino Fontes	3
(Japan) Mitsubishi Ralliart	Mitsubishi	Lancer 2000 Turbo	Y	(Austria) Georg Fischer	3, 9
(Japan) Mitsubishi Ralliart	Mitsubishi	Lancer 2000 Turbo	Y	(Finland) Harri Toivonen	9, 12
(France) Peugeot Sport	Peugeot	504 Pick-up V6	M	(Kenya) John Hellier	4
(France) Peugeot Sport	Peugeot	504 Pick-up V6	M	(Kenya) Basil Criticos	4
(France) BMW Motul	BMW	M1	P	(France) Bernard Béguin	5
(Italy) Jolly Club	Lancia	Rally 037	P	(Italy) Adartico Vudafieri	5, 10
(Italy) Jolly Club	Lancia	Rally 037	P	(Italy) Miki Biasion	10
(Italy) Jolly Club	Lancia	Rally 037	P	(Italy) Tonino Tognana	10
(Japan) Toyota Team Europe	Toyota	Celica TCT	P	(Sweden) Björn Waldegård	9, 11–12
(Japan) Toyota Team Europe	Toyota	Celica TCT	P	(Finland) Juha Kankkunen	9, 11–12
(Japan) Toyota Team Europe	Toyota	Celica TCT	P	(Sweden) Per Eklund	11–12
(Italy) Pro Motor Sport	Ferrari	308 GTB	M	(Sweden) Björn Waldegård	10
(Italy) Pro Motor Sport	Ferrari	308 GTB	M	(Italy) Federico Ormezzano	10
(Italy) Pro Motor Sport	Ferrari	308 GTB	M	(Italy) Maurizio Cavalli	10
(United Kingdom) GM Dealer Sport	Vauxhall	Chevette 2300 HSR	M	(United Kingdom) Russell Brookes	12
(United Kingdom) GM Dealer Sport	Vauxhall	Chevette 2300 HSR	M	(United Kingdom) Terry Kaby	12
(United Kingdom) GM Dealer Sport	Vauxhall	Chevette 2300 HSR	M	(United Kingdom) George Hill	12

== Events ==
=== Map ===
Black = Tarmac	Brown = Gravel	Blue = Snow/Ice	Red = Mixed Surface

=== Schedule and results ===
Round	Rally name	Stages	Podium finishers					
Round	Rally name	Stages	Rank	Driver	Co-driver	Team	Car	Time
1	(Monaco) Rallye Automobile Monte Carlo (22–29 January 1983)	30 stages 709 km (441 mi); Tarmac	1	(West Germany) Walter Röhrl	(West Germany) Christian Geistdörfer	(Italy) Martini Racing	Lancia Rally 037	7:58:57
1	(Monaco) Rallye Automobile Monte Carlo (22–29 January 1983)	30 stages 709 km (441 mi); Tarmac	2	(Finland) Markku Alén	(Finland) Ilkka Kivimäki	(Italy) Martini Racing	Lancia Rally 037	8:05:59
1	(Monaco) Rallye Automobile Monte Carlo (22–29 January 1983)	30 stages 709 km (441 mi); Tarmac	3	(Sweden) Stig Blomqvist	(Sweden) Björn Cederberg	(West Germany) Audi Sport	Audi Quattro A1	8:10:15
2	(Sweden) Swedish Rally (11–13 February 1983)	24 stages 466 km (290 mi); Snow/Ice	1	(Finland) Hannu Mikkola	(Sweden) Arne Hertz	(West Germany) Audi Sport	Audi Quattro A1	4:28:47
2	(Sweden) Swedish Rally (11–13 February 1983)	24 stages 466 km (290 mi); Snow/Ice	2	(Sweden) Stig Blomqvist	(Sweden) Björn Cederberg	(West Germany) Audi Sport	Audi 80 Quattro	4:29:34
2	(Sweden) Swedish Rally (11–13 February 1983)	24 stages 466 km (290 mi); Snow/Ice	3	(Finland) Lasse Lampi	(Finland) Pentti Kuukkala	(West Germany) Audi Sport	Audi Quattro A1	4:32:51
3	Rallye de Portugal (2–5 March 1983)	40 stages 642 km (399 mi); Gravel/Tarmac	1	(Finland) Hannu Mikkola	(Sweden) Arne Hertz	(West Germany) Audi Sport	Audi Quattro A1	7:17:24
3	Rallye de Portugal (2–5 March 1983)	40 stages 642 km (399 mi); Gravel/Tarmac	2	(France) Michèle Mouton	(Italy) Fabrizia Pons	(West Germany) Audi Sport	Audi Quattro A1	7:18:19
3	Rallye de Portugal (2–5 March 1983)	40 stages 642 km (399 mi); Gravel/Tarmac	3	(West Germany) Walter Röhrl	(West Germany) Christian Geistdörfer	(Italy) Martini Racing	Lancia Rally 037	7:19:14
4	(Kenya) Safari Rally (30 March – 4 April 1983)	87 controls 5,035 km (3,129 mi); Gravel	1	(Finland) Ari Vatanen	(United Kingdom) Terry Harryman	(West Germany) Rothmans Opel Rally Team	Opel Ascona 400	+3:96 pen
4	(Kenya) Safari Rally (30 March – 4 April 1983)	87 controls 5,035 km (3,129 mi); Gravel	2	(Finland) Hannu Mikkola	(Sweden) Arne Hertz	(West Germany) Audi Sport	Audi Quattro A1	+4:02 pen
4	(Kenya) Safari Rally (30 March – 4 April 1983)	87 controls 5,035 km (3,129 mi); Gravel	3	(France) Michèle Mouton	(Italy) Fabrizia Pons	(West Germany) Audi Sport	Audi Quattro A1	+4:55 pen
5	(France) Tour de Corse (5–7 May 1983)	28 stages 1,008 km (626 mi); Tarmac	1	(Finland) Markku Alén	(Finland) Ilkka Kivimäki	(Italy) Martini Racing	Lancia Rally 037	12:43:38
5	(France) Tour de Corse (5–7 May 1983)	28 stages 1,008 km (626 mi); Tarmac	2	(West Germany) Walter Röhrl	(West Germany) Christian Geistdörfer	(Italy) Martini Racing	Lancia Rally 037	12:45:27
5	(France) Tour de Corse (5–7 May 1983)	28 stages 1,008 km (626 mi); Tarmac	3	(Italy) Adartico Vudafieri	(Italy) Luigi Pirollo	(Italy) Jolly Club	Lancia Rally 037	12:50:08
6	Acropolis Rally Greece (30 May – 2 June 1983)	45 stages 836 km (519 mi); Gravel	1	(West Germany) Walter Röhrl	(West Germany) Christian Geistdörfer	(Italy) Martini Racing	Lancia Rally 037	11:12:22
6	Acropolis Rally Greece (30 May – 2 June 1983)	45 stages 836 km (519 mi); Gravel	2	(Finland) Markku Alén	(Finland) Ilkka Kivimäki	(Italy) Martini Racing	Lancia Rally 037	11:18:42
6	Acropolis Rally Greece (30 May – 2 June 1983)	45 stages 836 km (519 mi); Gravel	3	(Sweden) Stig Blomqvist	(Sweden) Björn Cederberg	(West Germany) Audi Sport	Audi Quattro A2	11:26:18
7	Rally New Zealand (25–28 June 1983)	33 stages 1,069 km (664 mi); Gravel	1	(West Germany) Walter Röhrl	(West Germany) Christian Geistdörfer	(Italy) Martini Racing	Lancia Rally 037	12:10:13
7	Rally New Zealand (25–28 June 1983)	33 stages 1,069 km (664 mi); Gravel	2	(Finland) Timo Salonen	(Finland) Seppo Harjanne	(Japan) Team Nissan Europe	Nissan 240RS	12:26:11
7	Rally New Zealand (25–28 June 1983)	33 stages 1,069 km (664 mi); Gravel	3	(Italy) Attilio Bettega	(Italy) Maurizio Perissinot	(Italy) Martini Racing	Lancia Rally 037	12:41:42
8	Rally Argentina (2–6 August 1983)	18 stages 1,274 km (792 mi); Gravel	1	(Finland) Hannu Mikkola	(Sweden) Arne Hertz	(West Germany) Audi Sport	Audi Quattro A2	10:18:54
8	Rally Argentina (2–6 August 1983)	18 stages 1,274 km (792 mi); Gravel	2	(Sweden) Stig Blomqvist	(Sweden) Björn Cederberg	(West Germany) Audi Sport	Audi Quattro A2	10:21:28
8	Rally Argentina (2–6 August 1983)	18 stages 1,274 km (792 mi); Gravel	3	(France) Michèle Mouton	(Italy) Fabrizia Pons	(West Germany) Audi Sport	Audi Quattro A2	10:25:35
9	Rally Finland (26–28 August 1983)	50 stages 473 km (294 mi); Gravel	1	(Finland) Hannu Mikkola	(Sweden) Arne Hertz	(West Germany) Audi Sport	Audi Quattro A2	4:23:44
9	Rally Finland (26–28 August 1983)	50 stages 473 km (294 mi); Gravel	2	(Sweden) Stig Blomqvist	(Sweden) Björn Cederberg	(West Germany) Audi Sport	Audi Quattro A2	4:24:05
9	Rally Finland (26–28 August 1983)	50 stages 473 km (294 mi); Gravel	3	(Finland) Markku Alén	(Finland) Ilkka Kivimäki	(Italy) Martini Racing	Lancia Rally 037	4:24:33
10	(Italy) Rallye Sanremo (2–8 October 1983)	58 stages 775 km (482 mi); Gravel/Tarmac	1	(Finland) Markku Alén	(Finland) Ilkka Kivimäki	(Italy) Martini Racing	Lancia Rally 037	8:50:17
10	(Italy) Rallye Sanremo (2–8 October 1983)	58 stages 775 km (482 mi); Gravel/Tarmac	2	(West Germany) Walter Röhrl	(West Germany) Christian Geistdörfer	(Italy) Martini Racing	Lancia Rally 037	8:52:26
10	(Italy) Rallye Sanremo (2–8 October 1983)	58 stages 775 km (482 mi); Gravel/Tarmac	3	(Italy) Attilio Bettega	(Italy) Maurizio Perissinot	(Italy) Martini Racing	Lancia Rally 037	8:55:27
11	(Ivory Coast) Rallye Côte d'Ivoire (25–30 October 1983)	54 controls 4,600 km (2,900 mi); Gravel	1	(Sweden) Björn Waldegård	(Sweden) Hans Thorszelius	(Japan) Toyota Team Europe	Toyota Celica TCT	+5:18 pen
11	(Ivory Coast) Rallye Côte d'Ivoire (25–30 October 1983)	54 controls 4,600 km (2,900 mi); Gravel	2	(Finland) Hannu Mikkola	(Sweden) Arne Hertz	(West Germany) Audi Sport	Audi Quattro A2	+5:29 pen
11	(Ivory Coast) Rallye Côte d'Ivoire (25–30 October 1983)	54 controls 4,600 km (2,900 mi); Gravel	3	(Sweden) Per Eklund	(United Kingdom) Dave Whittock	(Japan) Toyota Team Europe	Toyota Celica TCT	+6:58 pen
12	(United Kingdom) RAC Rally (19–23 November 1983)	57 stages 790 km (490 mi); Gravel/Tarmac	1	(Sweden) Stig Blomqvist	(Sweden) Björn Cederberg	(United Kingdom) Audi Sport UK	Audi Quattro A2	8:50:28
12	(United Kingdom) RAC Rally (19–23 November 1983)	57 stages 790 km (490 mi); Gravel/Tarmac	2	(Finland) Hannu Mikkola	(Sweden) Arne Hertz	(West Germany) Audi Sport	Audi Quattro A2	9:00:21
12	(United Kingdom) RAC Rally (19–23 November 1983)	57 stages 790 km (490 mi); Gravel/Tarmac	3	(United Kingdom) Jimmy McRae	(United Kingdom) Ian Grindrod	(West Germany) Rothmans Opel Rally Team	Opel Manta 400	9:12:19

== Standings ==
=== Drivers' championship ===
Rank	Driver	Event												Total points
Rank	Driver	(Monaco) MON	(Sweden) SWE	(Portugal) POR	(Kenya) KEN	(France) FRA	(Greece) GRC	(New Zealand) NZL	(Argentina) ARG	(Finland) FIN	(Italy) ITA	(Ivory Coast) CIV	(United Kingdom) GBR	Total points
1	(Finland) Hannu Mikkola	(10)	20	20	15	–	–	–	20	20	–	15	15	125
2	(West Germany) Walter Röhrl	20	–	12	–	15	20	20	–	–	15	–	–	102
3	(Finland) Markku Alén	15	–	10	–	20	15	–	8	12	20	–	–	100
4	(Sweden) Stig Blomqvist	12	15	–	–	–	12	–	15	15	–	–	20	89
5	(France) Michèle Mouton	–	10	15	12	–	–	–	12	–	4	–	–	53
6	(Finland) Ari Vatanen	8	6	–	20	–	10	–	–	–	–	–	–	44
7	(Italy) Attilio Bettega	–	–	–	–	10	8	12	–	–	12	–	–	42
8	(Finland) Lasse Lampi	–	12	–	–	–	–	–	–	4	–	–	10	26
9	(Kenya) Shekhar Mehta	–	–	–	–	–	6	10	10	–	–	–	–	26
10	(Sweden) Per Eklund	–	–	–	–	–	–	–	–	10	–	12	–	22
11	(Sweden) Björn Waldegård	–	–	–	–	–	–	–	–	–	–	20	–	20
12	(Italy) Adartico Vudafieri	–	–	8	–	12	–	–	–	–	–	–	–	20
13	(Finland) Timo Salonen	–	–	–	–	–	–	15	–	3	–	–	–	18
14	(Finland) Henri Toivonen	6	–	–	–	–	–	–	–	–	10	–	–	16
15	(United Kingdom) Jimmy McRae	–	–	–	–	–	3	–	–	–	–	–	12	15
16	(Sweden) Kalle Grundel	–	8	–	–	–	–	–	–	–	–	–	3	11
17	(Kenya) Jayant Shah	–	–	–	10	–	–	–	–	–	–	–	–	10
17	(France) Alain Ambrosino	–	–	–	–	–	–	–	–	–	–	10	–	10
19	(Finland) Juha Kankkunen	–	–	–	–	–	–	–	–	6	–	–	4	10
20	(France) Bruno Saby	1	–	–	–	8	–	–	–	–	–	–	–	9
21	(Kenya) Johnny Hellier	–	–	–	8	–	–	–	–	–	–	–	–	8
21	(New Zealand) Reg Cook	–	–	–	–	–	–	8	–	–	–	–	–	8
21	(Finland) Pentti Airikkala	–	–	–	–	–	–	–	–	8	–	–	–	8
21	(Italy) Miki Biasion	–	–	–	–	–	–	–	–	–	8	–	–	8
21	(Ivory Coast) Eugène Salim	–	–	–	–	–	–	–	–	–	–	8	–	8
21	(United Kingdom) Russell Brookes	–	–	–	–	–	–	–	–	–	–	–	8	8
27	(Austria) Franz Wittmann	–	–	4	–	–	4	–	–	–	–	–	–	8
28	(Spain) Antonio Zanini	–	–	6	–	–	–	–	–	–	–	–	–	6
28	(West Germany) Wolfgang Stiller	–	–	–	6	–	–	–	–	–	–	–	–	6
28	(United Kingdom) Tony Pond	–	–	–	–	6	–	–	–	–	–	–	–	6
28	(New Zealand) Possum Bourne	–	–	–	–	–	–	6	–	–	–	–	–	6
28	(Austria) Franz Wurz	–	–	–	–	–	–	–	6	–	–	–	–	6
28	(Italy) Dario Cerrato	–	–	–	–	–	–	–	–	–	6	–	–	6
28	(United States) John Buffum	–	–	–	–	–	–	–	–	–	–	–	6	6
35	(France) Jean Ragnotti	4	–	–	–	–	–	–	–	–	–	–	–	4
35	(Sweden) Sören Nilsson	–	4	–	–	–	–	–	–	–	–	–	–	4
35	(Kenya) Manoj Shah	–	–	–	4	–	–	–	–	–	–	–	–	4
35	(France) Jean-Sébastien Couloumiès	–	–	–	–	4	–	–	–	–	–	–	–	4
35	(New Zealand) Michael Bish	–	–	–	–	–	–	4	–	–	–	–	–	4
35	(Argentina) Ernesto Soto	–	–	–	–	–	–	–	4	–	–	–	–	4
41	(France) Jean-Claude Andruet	3	–	–	–	–	–	–	–	–	–	–	–	3
41	(Sweden) Mikael Ericsson	–	3	–	–	–	–	–	–	–	–	–	–	3
41	(United Kingdom) Terry Kaby	–	–	3	–	–	–	–	–	–	–	–	–	3
41	(Kenya) Paul de Voest	–	–	–	3	–	–	–	–	–	–	–	–	3
41	(France) Alain Coppier	–	–	–	–	3	–	–	–	–	–	–	–	3
41	(New Zealand) Peter Watt	–	–	–	–	–	–	3	–	–	–	–	–	3
41	(Argentina) Jorge Recalde	–	–	–	–	–	–	–	3	–	–	–	–	3
41	(Italy) Lucky	–	–	–	–	–	–	–	–	–	3	–	–	3
49	(Finland) Mikael Sundström	–	–	–	–	–	–	–	–	1	–	–	2	3
50	(France) Francis Serpaggi	2	–	–	–	–	–	–	–	–	–	–	–	2
50	(Sweden) Lars-Erik Walfridsson	–	2	–	–	–	–	–	–	–	–	–	–	2
50	(France) Christian Dorche	–	–	2	–	–	–	–	–	–	–	–	–	2
50	(France) Jean-Michel Guyot	–	–	–	–	2	–	–	–	–	–	–	–	2
50	(France) Philippe Wambergue	–	–	–	–	–	2	–	–	–	–	–	–	2
50	(New Zealand) Mike Cameron	–	–	–	–	–	–	2	–	–	–	–	–	2
50	(Argentina) Carlos Celis	–	–	–	–	–	–	–	2	–	–	–	–	2
50	(Finland) Erkki Pitkänen	–	–	–	–	–	–	–	–	2	–	–	–	2
50	(France) Bernard Darniche	–	–	–	–	–	–	–	–	–	2	–	–	2
59	(Sweden) Ola Strömberg	–	1	–	–	–	–	–	–	–	–	–	–	1
59	(Belgium) Marc Duez	–	–	1	–	–	–	–	–	–	–	–	–	1
59	(France) Jean-Louis Ravenel	–	–	–	–	1	–	–	–	–	–	–	–	1
59	(France) Maurice Chomat	–	–	–	–	–	1	–	–	–	–	–	–	1
59	(Argentina) Gerardo del Campo	–	–	–	–	–	–	–	1	–	–	–	–	1
59	(Italy) Gabriele Noberasco	–	–	–	–	–	–	–	–	–	1	–	–	1
59	(Sweden) Mats Holmbom	–	–	–	–	–	–	–	–	–	–	–	1	1

=== Manufacturers' championship ===
Rank	Manufacturers	Event										Total points
Rank	Manufacturers	(Monaco) MON	(Portugal) POR	(Kenya) KEN	(France) FRA	(Greece) GRC	(New Zealand) NZL	(Argentina) ARG	(Finland) FIN	(Italy) ITA	(United Kingdom) GBR	Total points
1	(Italy) Lancia	18	14	–	18	18	18	(10)	14	18	–	118
2	(West Germany) Audi	14	18	16	–	14	–	18	18	(6)	18	116
3	(West Germany) Opel	10	(9)	18	12	12	–	–	9	12	14	87
4	(Japan) Nissan	–	4	12	8	8	16	–	4	–	–	52
5	(France) Renault	6	–	–	10	–	–	11	–	–	–	27
6	(Japan) Toyota	–	–	10	–	–	–	–	8	–	6	24
7	(Japan) Subaru	–	–	–	–	–	13	–	–	–	–	13
8	(United Kingdom) British Leyland Cars	–	–	–	–	–	11	–	–	–	–	11
8	(West Germany) Volkswagen	–	–	–	–	–	–	–	–	–	11	11
10	(France) Peugeot	–	–	10	–	–	–	–	–	–	–	10
10	(United Kingdom) Vauxhall	–	–	–	–	–	–	–	–	–	10	10
12	(Japan) Mazda	–	–	–	–	–	9	–	–	–	–	9
12	(Italy) Alfa Romeo	–	–	–	–	–	–	–	–	9	–	9
14	(France) Citroën	–	2	–	5	2	–	–	–	–	–	9
15	(United Kingdom) Talbot	–	8	–	–	–	–	–	–	–	–	8
16	(Japan) Mitsubishi	–	–	–	–	–	7	–	–	–	–	7

== Pointscoring systems ==
=== Drivers' championship ===
Points awarded by finish	1st	2nd	3rd	4th	5th	6th	7th	8th	9th	10th
Points awarded by finish	20	15	12	10	8	6	4	3	2	1

=== Manufacturers' championship ===
Overall finish	Group finish									
Overall finish	1	2	3	4	5	6	7	8	9	10
1	18	–	–	–	–	–	–	–	–	–
2	17	16	–	–	–	–	–	–	–	–
3	16	15	14	–	–	–	–	–	–	–
4	15	14	13	12	–	–	–	–	–	–
5	14	13	12	11	10	–	–	–	–	–
6	13	12	11	10	9	8	–	–	–	–
7	12	11	10	9	8	7	6	–	–	–
8	11	10	9	8	7	6	5	4	–	–
9	10	9	8	7	6	5	4	3	2	–
10	9	8	7	6	5	4	3	2	1	1
