= Rally Hall of Fame =

The Rally Hall of Fame is a hall of fame for famous rally drivers and other persons who have had a great influence on rallying. The exhibition is part of the automobile and road museum Mobilia located at Kangasala, near the city of Tampere, in central Finland.

The Hall of Fame was opened on 29 April 2010 with four inductees; Erik Carlsson, Paddy Hopkirk, Rauno Aaltonen and Timo Mäkinen. Walter Röhrl and Hannu Mikkola were elected in 2011, and Michèle Mouton and Carlos Sainz in 2012. New nominations are introduced every year during the Rally Finland.

The selections are made by an international committee led by AKK-Motorsport, Finland's representative in the Fédération Internationale de l'Automobile (FIA). In 2011, the selection committee consisted of five persons: Mouton, Kari O. Sohlberg (chairman of AKK), Neil Duncanson (owner of North One Television), Martin Holmes (motorsport journalist) and Pekka Honkanen (director of the Sports Museum Foundation of Finland).

== Members ==
Name	Year elected
(Finland) Rauno Aaltonen	2010
(Sweden) Erik Carlsson	2010
(United Kingdom) Paddy Hopkirk	2010
(Finland) Timo Mäkinen	2010
(Finland) Hannu Mikkola	2011
(Germany) Walter Röhrl	2011
(France) Michèle Mouton	2012
(Spain) Carlos Sainz	2012
(United Kingdom) Andrew Cowan	2013
(Finland) Tommi Mäkinen	2013
(Sweden) Björn Waldegård	2013
(Sweden) Stig Blomqvist	2014
(United Kingdom) David Richards	2014
(Finland) Ari Vatanen	2014
(Finland) Juha Kankkunen	2015
(United Kingdom) Colin McRae	2015
(Italy) Sandro Munari	2015
(Finland) Henri Toivonen	2016
(Kenya) Shekhar Mehta	2017
(Finland) Markku Alén	2018
(Sweden) Ove Andersson	2018
(Germany) Reinhard Klein	2018
(Finland) Simo Lampinen	2018
(France) Jean Todt	2019
(Finland) Seppo Harjanne	2019
(Finland) Timo Salonen	2019
(United Kingdom) Pat Moss	2020
(Finland) Pauli Toivonen	2020
(Finland) Marcus Grönholm	2021
(United Kingdom) Martin Holmes	2021
(Italy) Cesare Fiorio	2022
(Italy) Massimo Biasion	2022
(Finland) Juha Piironen	2022
(Finland) Ilkka Kivimäki	2022
(France) Didier Auriol	2023
(United Kingdom) Richard Burns	2023
(Finland) Lasse Lampi	2023
