= Michel Wyder =

Swiss rally co-driver

- Born: 1 March 1950
- Died: 31 May 1986 (aged 36)
- Occupation: Rally co-driver

Michel Wyder (1 March 1950 – 31 May 1986) was a Swiss rally co-driver, who served as the co-driver of ex-Formula One driver Marc Surer until his death at the 1986 ADAC Rallye Hessen.

== Death ==
Wyder was killed at the 1986 ADAC Rallye Hessen after the Ford RS200 Surer was driving crashed into a tree and burst into flames. Wyder burned to death in the wreckage while Surer ended up in a coma. 1986 was turning into a dark year for the rallying community, with the deaths of Henri Toivonen and Sergio Cresto earlier that month in the Tour de Corse.

Surer remained comatose for three weeks, and the crash ultimately brought an end to his Formula One career.
