= Sergio Cresto =

American rally co-driver (1956–1986)

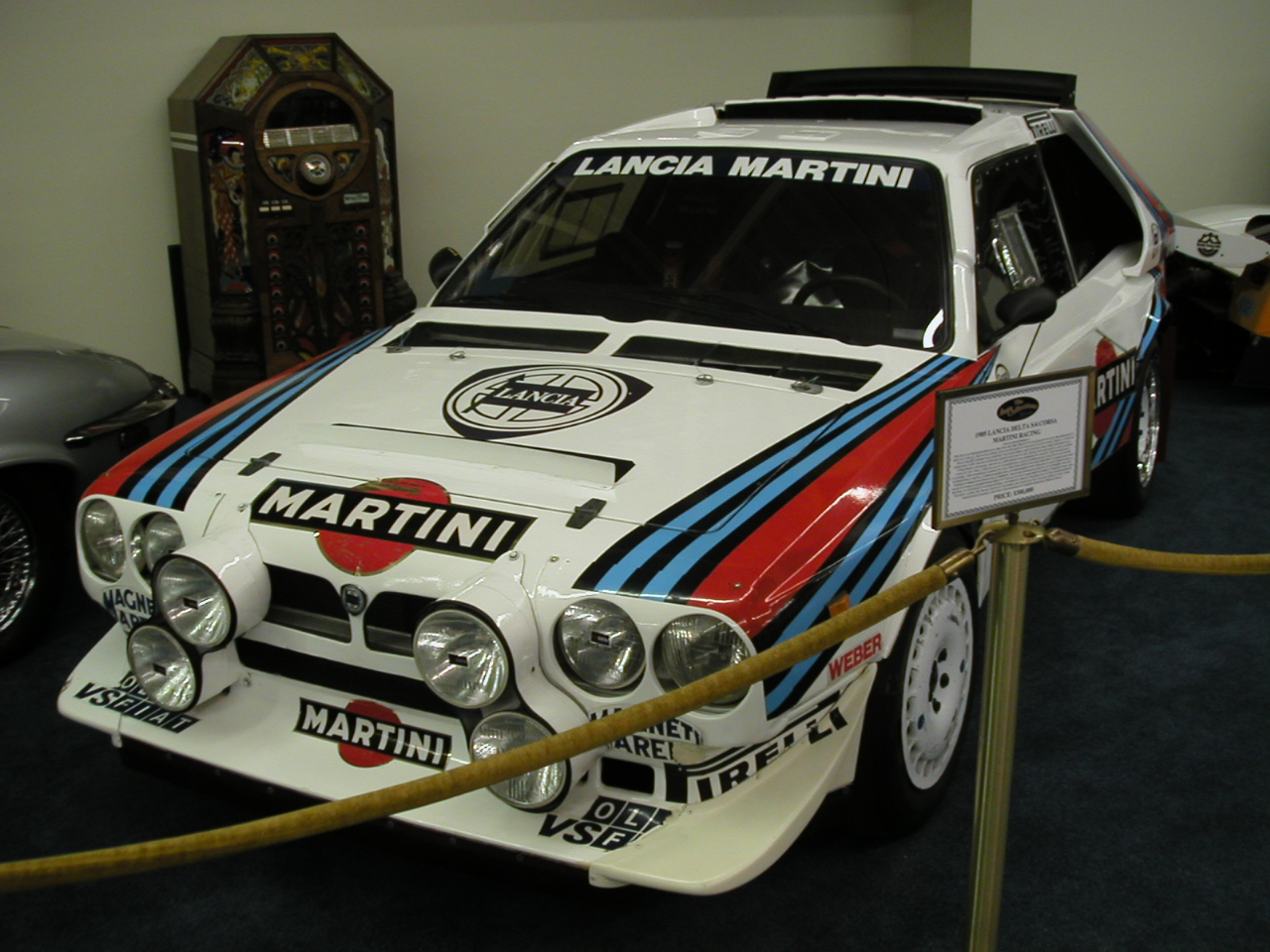
Lancia Delta S4 similar to the one Cresto co-piloted

Sergio Cresto (January 19, 1956 – May 2, 1986) was the American co-driver of Finnish Henri Toivonen at the Lancia Martini team for the 1986 World Rally Championship season. He was also a former co-driver for fellow Lancia employee Attilio Bettega, who died in an accident during the 1985 Tour de Corse on May 2, 1985. His co-driver Maurizio Perissinot survived the crash uninjured. This event happened exactly one year before the accident that claimed the lives of both Sergio Cresto and his then co-driver Henri Toivonen on May 2, 1986.

== Biography ==
Sergio Cresto was born in New York on 19 January 1956. Cresto lived in Ospedaletti, near Sanremo. He began racing in an Opel Kadett GT/E with Amedeo Gerbino. In 1979, Cresto was Tonino Tognana's co-driver in a Kadett GT/E, as well as in the more powerful Fiat 131 Abarth two years later. In 1981, Cresto and Tognana came in eight in the Italian Championship. In 1982, Cresto was co-driver with another top driver, Gianfranco Cunico, in a Fiat Ritmo 130, getting good results. The following year, Cresto again changed drivers and ended the season placing three times at the Italian national level: sixth with Michele Cinotto after the third place finishes at Targa Florio and again at Quattro Regioni in a Lancia 037) tenth with Andrea Zanussi (after finishing second at the San Marino Rally in a Lancia 037). With Zanussi, Cresto came in third at Halkidikis as well that year, a European Championship qualifying race. He competed again in the same race the following year with Carlo Capone in a Lancia 037. After a long successful season and a duel with Henri Toivonen and his Porsche, the Italians eventually won the European Championship. After Maurizio Perissinot's accident, Cresto was Attilio Bettega's co-driver for two races qualifying for the World Championship. In 1985, he raced again with Zanussi for Lancia.

After the accident, only the blackened space frame remained of Toivonen and Cresto's Lancia Delta S4.

In 1986, Cresto was Henri Toivonen's co-driver in a Lancia Delta S4. After a strong start to the season, including a win in the Rally Monte Carlo, Toivonen and Cresto were the favourites for the World Championship title. Racing into the Tour de Corse with a 1:42 lead, they crashed during the eighteenth stage of the rally. Their Lancia went off the side of the road, plunged down a ravine and landed on its roof. The aluminum fuel tank underneath the driver's seat was ruptured by the trees and exploded. Toivonen and Cresto had no time to get out and both men burned to death in their seats. The accident had no witnesses close enough to clearly see the accident. Services for Cresto were held in Villastellone, Italy, on May 4, 1986. The accident led to the FIA's decision to ban Group B cars after the 1986 season.
