= Attilio Bettega =

Italian rally driver (1953–1985)

Personal information
- Nationality: (Italy) Italian
- Full name: Attilio Luigi Antonio Bettega
- Born: 19 February 1953; Trento, Italy
- Died: 2 May 1985 (aged 32); Zérubia, Corsica, France

World Rally Championship record
- Years active: 1978–1985
- Co-driver: (Italy) Isabella Torghele (Italy) Gianni Vacchetto (Italy) Maurizio Perissinot (Italy) Mario Mannucci (Italy) Arnaldo Bernacchini (United States) Sergio Cresto
- Teams: Fiat, Lancia
- Rallies: 26
- Championships: 0
- Rally wins: 0
- Podiums: 6
- Stage wins: 47
- Total points: 130
- First rally: 1978 San Remo Rally
- Last rally: 1985 Tour de Corse

Attilio Luigi Antonio Bettega (19 February 1953 – 2 May 1985) was an Italian rally driver. He won the 1984 Monza Rally Show.

== Biography ==
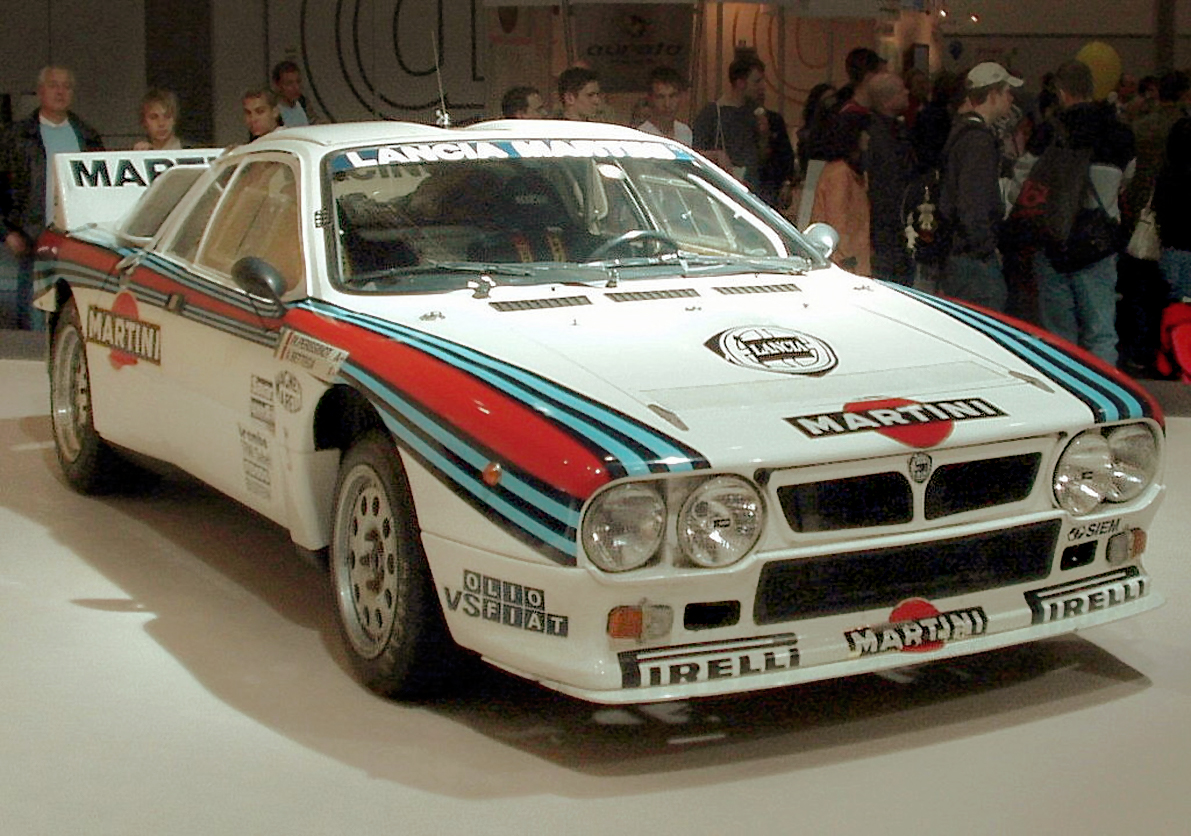
Bettega's Lancia 037.

Bettega was born in Molveno, Trentino. In 1982, he joined the Lancia team driving the Lancia 037 after some years with Fiat. In his Lancia years he gained four podium finishes in rallies counting towards the World Rally Championship. His last podium was also his most successful one, driving his Lancia to second place at the 1984 Rallye Sanremo.

In the 1985 season, Bettega entered the Safari Rally and the Tour de Corse. In Corsica, on the fourth stage of the rally, Zerubia, Bettega lost control of his Lancia and crashed into a tree which ruptured into the driver's seat and killed him instantly. His co-driver Maurizio Perissinot survived the crash uninjured.

Bettega's death caused the safety of Group B cars to be called into question. One year later, his former teammate Henri Toivonen and his co-driver Sergio Cresto with the Lancia Delta S4 #4 (same number as Bettega's car) died in a crash at the same event, triggering the ban of the Group B regulations.

== Racing record ==
=== Complete WRC results ===
Year	Entrant	Car	1	2	3	4	5	6	7	8	9	10	11	12	WDC	Pts
1978	Grifone Genova	Lancia Stratos HF	MON	SWE	KEN	POR	GRE	FIN	CAN	ITA; Ret	CIV	FRA; Ret	GBR		N/A	N/A
1979	Attilio Bettega	Fiat Ritmo 75	MON; Ret	SWE	POR	KEN	GRE	NZL	FIN	CAN					19th	12
1979	Attilio Bettega	Fiat 131 Abarth									ITA; 3	FRA	GBR	CIV	19th	12
1980	Fiat Italia	Fiat Ritmo 75	MON; 6	SWE											19th	15
1980	Fiat Italia	Fiat 131 Abarth			POR; Ret	KEN	GRC; 8	ARG; Ret	FIN	NZL	ITA; 6	FRA; Ret	GBR	CIV	19th	15
1981	Fiat Auto Torino	Fiat Ritmo 75	MON; Ret	SWE											20th	12
1981	Fiat Auto Torino	Fiat 131 Abarth			POR; Ret	KEN	FRA	GRC; 3	ARG	BRA	FIN	ITA; Ret	CIV	GBR	20th	12
1982	Martini Racing	Lancia Rally 037	MON	SWE	POR	KEN	FRA; Ret	GRC	NZL	BRA	FIN	ITA	CIV	GBR	NC	0
1983	Martini Racing	Lancia Rally 037	MON	SWE	POR	KEN	FRA; 4	GRC; 5	NZL; 3	ARG	FIN	ITA; 3	CIV	GBR	7th	42
1984	Martini Racing	Lancia Rally 037	MON; 5	SWE	POR; 3	KEN	FRA; 7	GRC; 4	NZL	ARG	FIN	ITA; 2	CIV	GBR	5th	49
1985	Martini Racing	Lancia Rally 037	MON	SWE	POR	KEN; Ret	FRA; Ret	GRC	NZL	ARG	FIN	ITA	CIV	GBR	NC	0
