= Terry Harryman =

British rally co-driver (1938–2026)

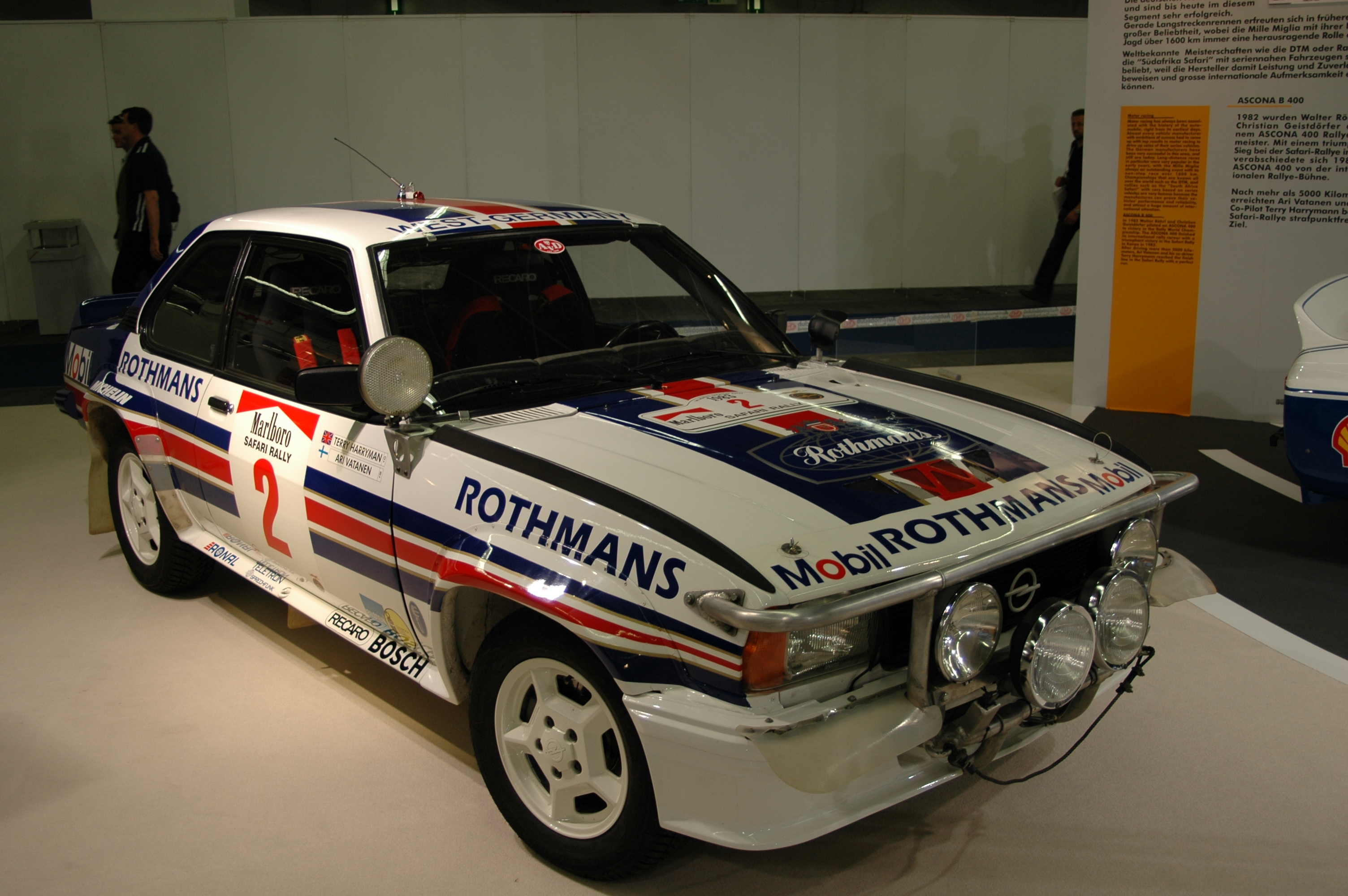
- The Opel Ascona 400 of Vatanen and Harryman from 1983.

Personal information
- Nationality: (United Kingdom) British
- Full name: Terence Arthur Harryman
- Born: 26 September 1938; Bangor, Northern Ireland
- Died: 21 September 2026 (aged 87)

World Rally Championship record
- Driver: (Finland) Ari Vatanen (United Kingdom) Malcolm Wilson (United Kingdom) Tony Pond (France) Michèle Mouton (United Kingdom) Mark Lovell (Italy) Franco Cunico

Terence Arthur Harryman (26 September 1938 – 21 September 2026) was a British rally co-driver.

Harryman won six rounds of the World Rally Championship between 1983 and 1985, partnering with Ari Vatanen. He also won the Deutsche Rallye Meisterschaft in 1986 alongside Michèle Mouton, and the Irish Tarmac Rally Championship in 1988 with Mark Lovell. In 2024, he was inducted into the Ards and North Down Hall of Fame.

Harryman later lived with Parkinson's disease. He died on 21 September 2026, aged 87.
