= Maurizio Perissinot =

Italian rally co-driver (1951–2004)

Perissinot with Martini Lancia in 1983

Maurizio "Icio" Perissinot (1 February 1951 in Pordenone – 12 December 2004) was an Italian rally co-driver, mainly for Attilio Bettega.

Perissinot survived an accident at the 1985 Tour de Corse which claimed the life of Bettega. He died in December 2004 after a long illness.
