= Sergio Limone =

Italian automobile engineer

- Born: Sergio Limone; 24 July 1948 (age 78); Turin, Italy.
- Education: Polytechnic University of Turin
- Occupation: Automotive engineer
- Known for: Automotive project manager and engineer for Abarth, Lancia and Alfa Romeo.

Sergio Limone (born 24 July 1948 in Turin) is an Italian automobile engineer. He has carried out numerous sports car projects for the Fiat Group, including the Lancia Rally 037, Lancia Delta S4 and Lancia Delta for FIA World Rally Championship, and the Alfa Romeo 155 and Alfa Romeo 156 Touring cars.

== Career ==
Mechanical expert, he graduated in engineering at the Polytechnic of Turin with a thesis on a Formula Monza car, a never finished car with its coachwork; in 1972 he joined Abarth, a brand that had just entered the orbit of the Fiat Group, working until 1975 on engines and applications relating to Group 2, Group 4 and Group 5 cars.
In 1975 he began his work as a chassis builder taking care of the Fiat 131 and other prototypes, alongside Mario Colucci, who was then responsible for the car chassis; in collaboration with Giorgio Pianta also conducts tests on various rally cars.
He worked on the Fiat 131 Abarth Rally, set by Colucci as regards the chassis, taking it to the end of his career, which arrived in 1979.
At the end of 1978, following a clash with the engineer Aurelio Lampredi, Colucci resigned so that Limone was promoted to head of vehicle design and testing, in relation to the experience department. In those months Limone took care of the development of the Fiat Group car for the World Rally Championship, choosing as the winning idea the Lancia Rally 037, an evolution of the Lancia Montecarlo and profoundly revisited to fight against the increasingly competitive four-wheel drive cars: the Rally 037, with its rear-wheel drive, will be the last 2WD car to win the World Rally Championship in 1983.
He then participated in the development of the Lancia Delta S4 of Group B as well as in subsequent evolutions, such as the Lancia ECV, which never raced in rallies after the abolition of Group S. With the creation of Group A, he therefore participated in the development and evolution of the Lancia Delta ( Lancia Delta HF 4WD and Lancia Delta HF Integrale ) for subsequent and multi-victorious participations in rallies until 1991, when Lancia retired from the FIA World Rally Championship.
In the meantime, he takes part in the development of a Group C car, the Alfa Romeo Sport Prototipo, derived from the Lancia LC2 and updated with all its contents to make it a winner, which, however, will never race on the track due to the management decisions of the Fiat Group managers.
He moved with the entire Lancia rally development team to Alfa Corse, in 1991 Limone began his first development for a new Alfa Romeo car for touring car racing; specifically we are talking about a sedan car with the mechanics of the Lancia Delta HF Integrale and the Alfa Romeo 155 coachwork in the racing version. In addition to the cars developed for track racing, he developed the Alfa Romeo 155 GTA Stradale, produced in a single model with the aim of stimulating the interest of the Alfa Romeo management in series production but this car will never have a productive following.
Finally, he participated in the development of the racing version of the Alfa Romeo 156, designed for the ETCC and WTCC championships of the early 2000s.

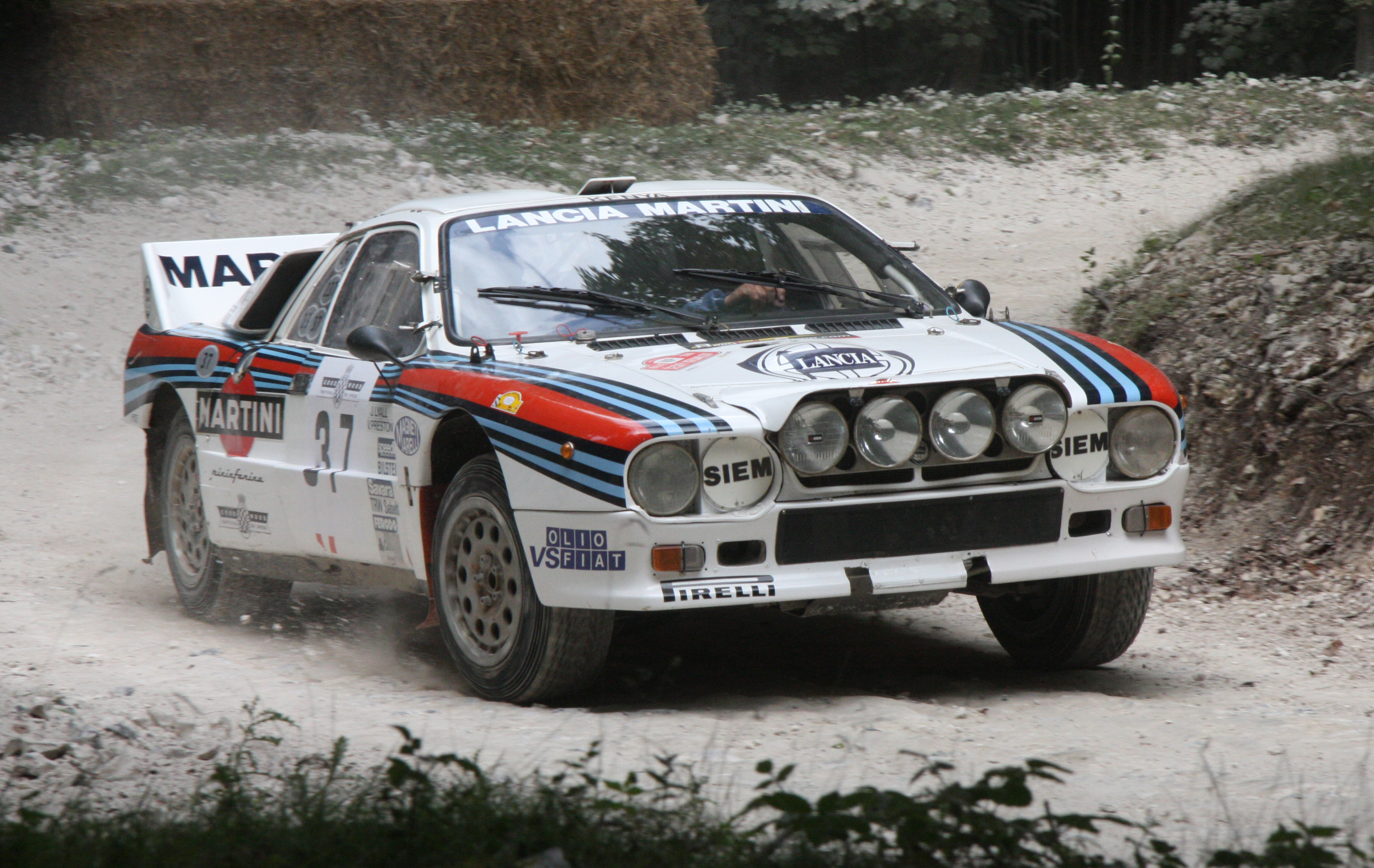
Lancia Rally 037

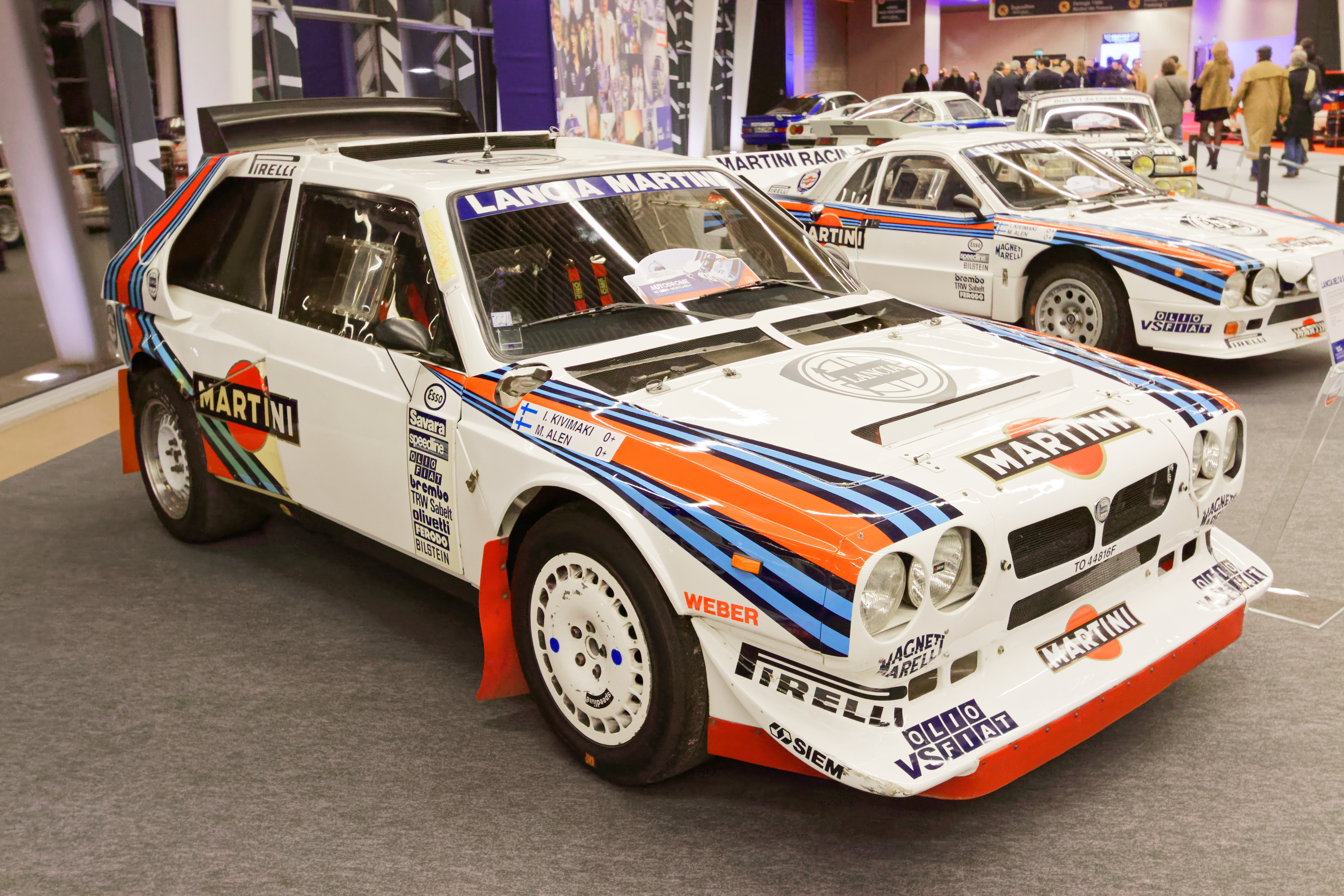
Lancia Delta S4

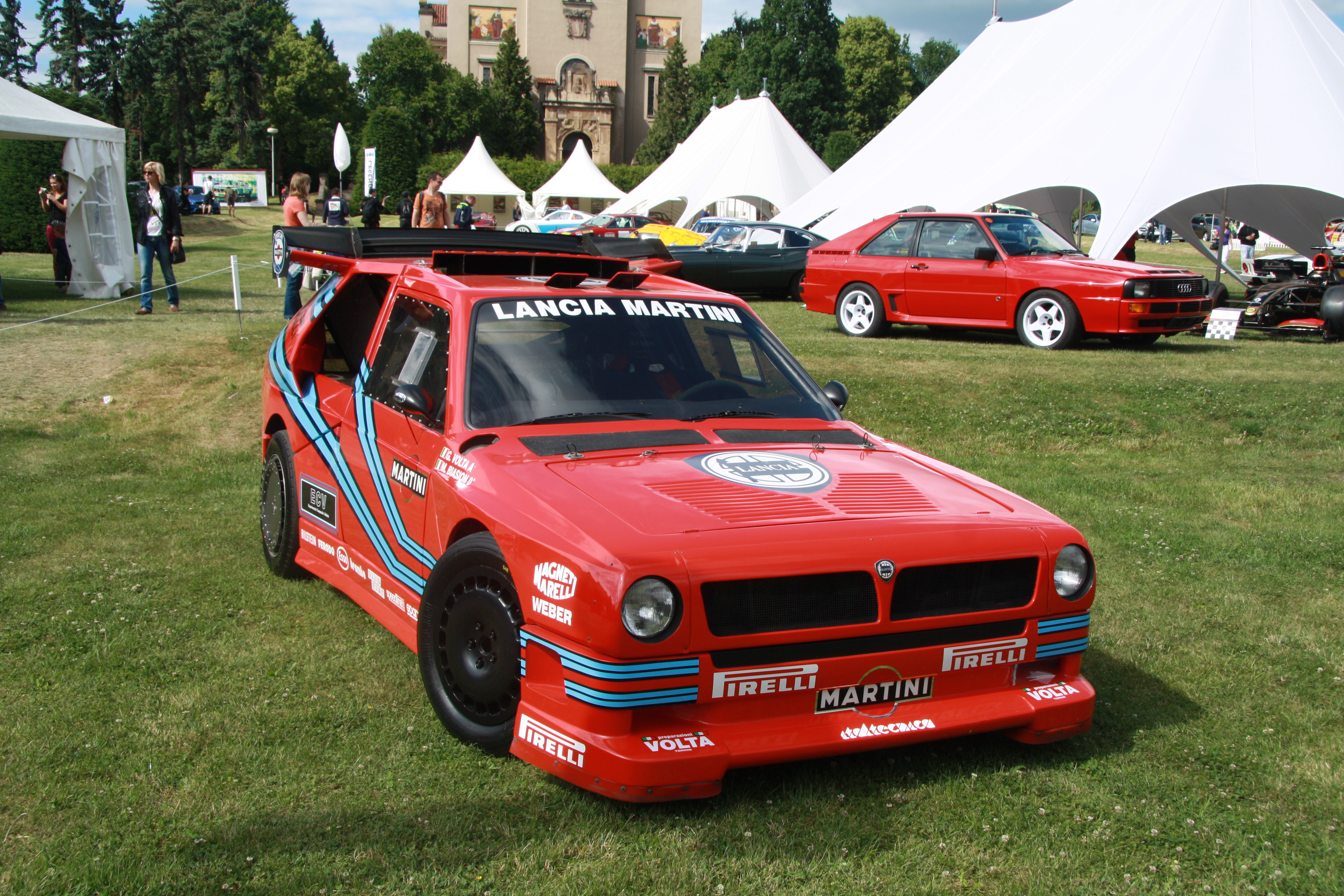
Lancia ECV
The car originally produced over 600 horsepower (448 kW) from a 1759 cc twin-turbocharged engine.

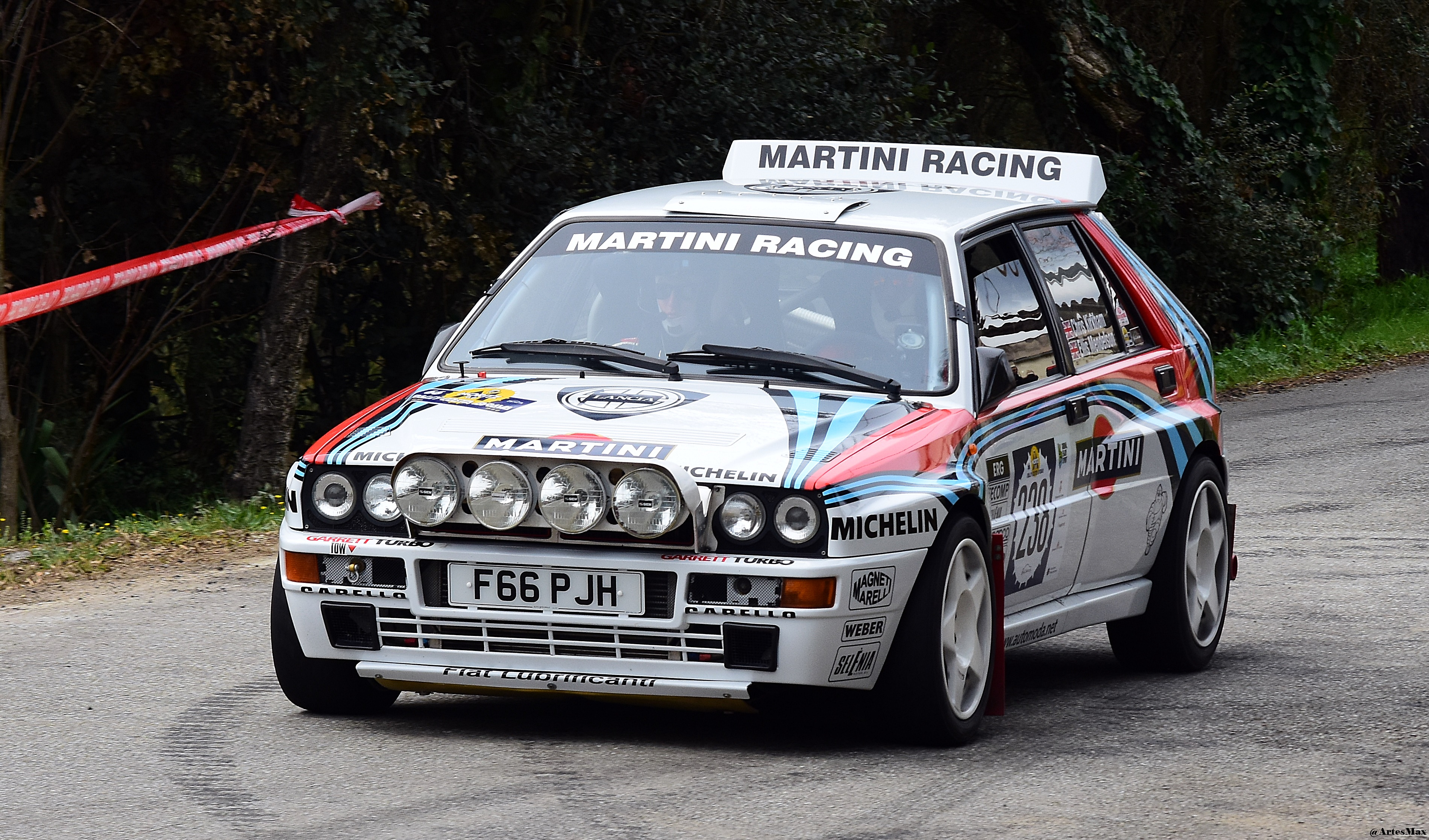
Lancia Delta HF Integrale. Lancia is the manufacturer with the most wins in the WRC: 11 world Championship for Manufacturers, with 6 consecutives.

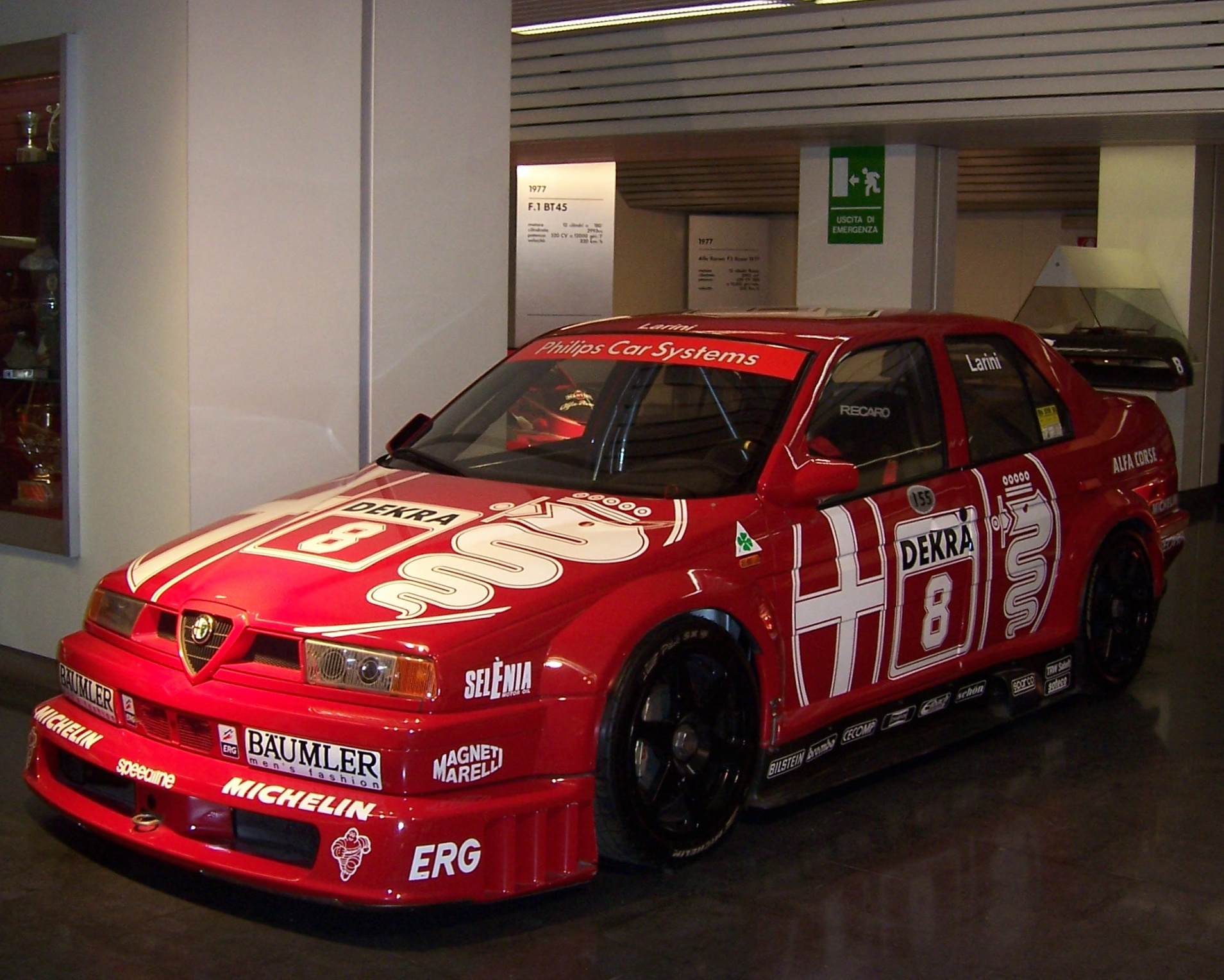
Alfa Romeo 155 V6 TI DTM of 1993 champion Nicola Larini. The 155 holds the all-time record of 38 victories in DTM.

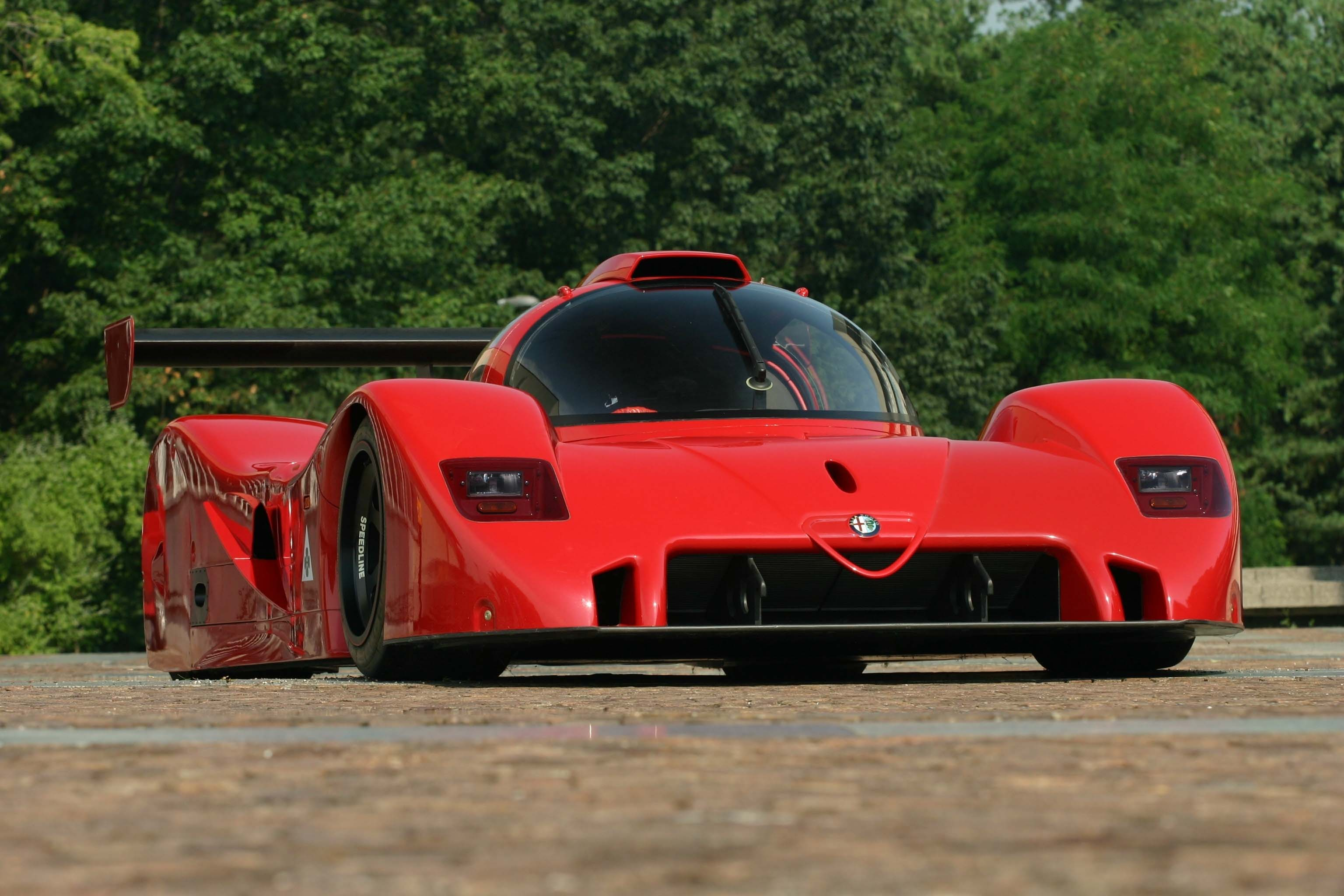
Alfa Romeo Sport Prototipo

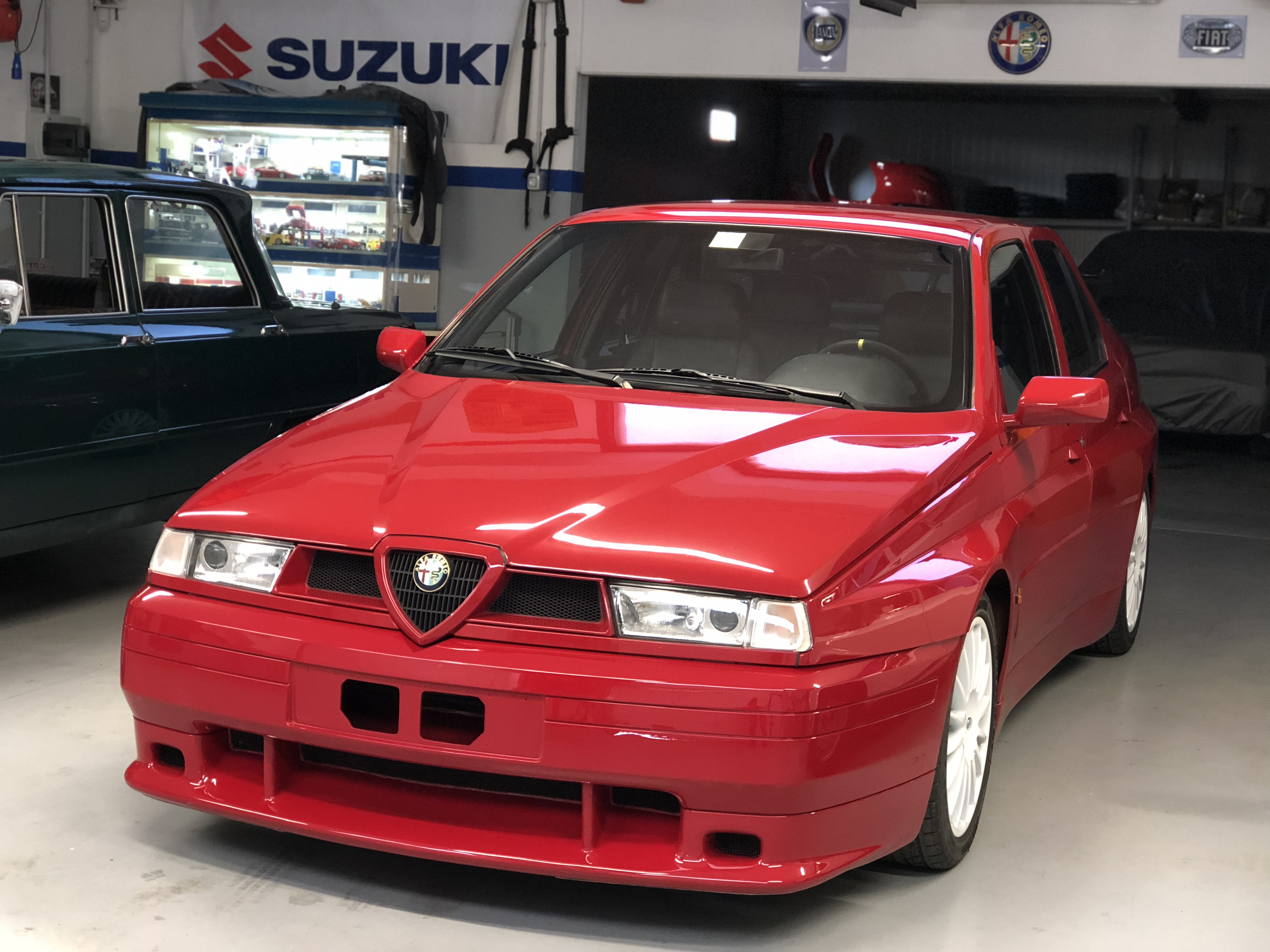
Alfa Romeo 155 GTA Stradale

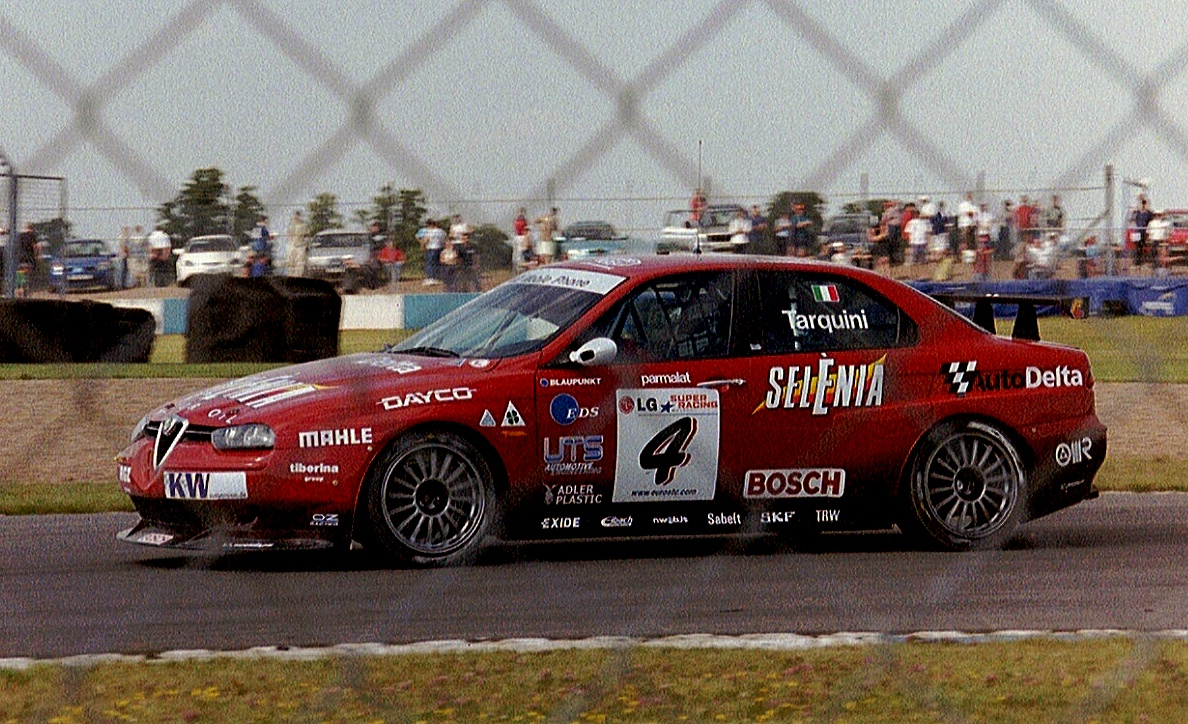
Alfa Romeo 156 GTA Super 2000, Gabriele Tarquini in Donington Park 2003 ETCC
