= Lancia Delta S4 =

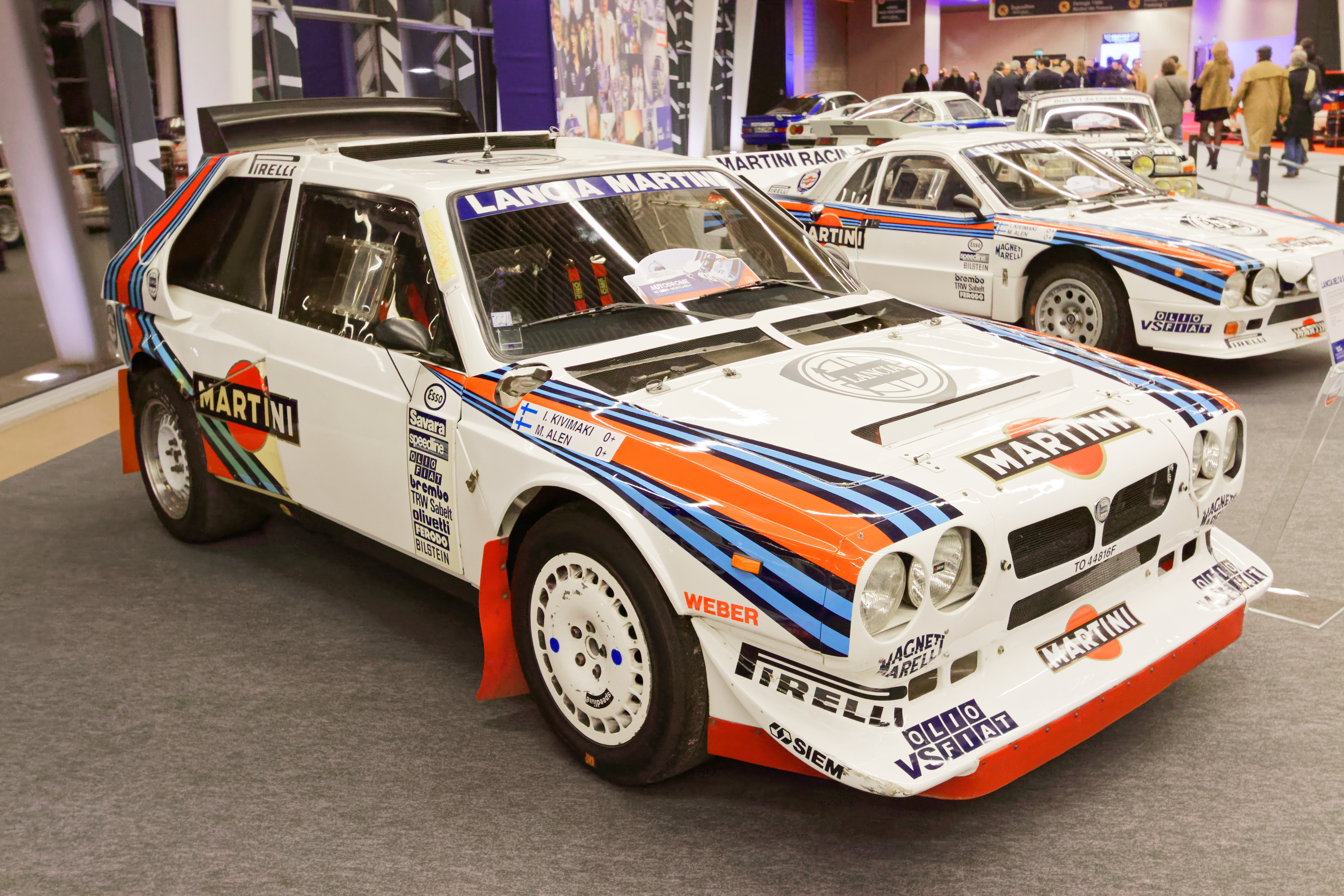
- Category: Group B
- Constructor: Fiat Auto
- Designers: Pier Paolo Messori (Technical Director); Sergio Limone; Renato Sconfienza; Bruno Giardino
- Predecessor: Lancia 037
- Successor: Lancia ECV; Lancia Delta HF 4WD

Technical specifications
- Chassis: Steel tubular space frame
- Suspension (front): A-arms, coaxial coil springs and dampers
- Suspension (rear): A-arms, coil springs, double dampers
- Length: 3,990 mm (157 in)
- Width: 1,880 mm (74 in)
- Height: 1,344 mm (53 in)
- Wheelbase: 2,440 mm (96 in)
- Engine: 1,759 cc (107.3 cu in) Lancia 233 ATR 18S DOHC 16v I4 twincharged and intercooled, longitudinally mid-mounted
- Weight: 890–1,050 kg (1,962–2,315 lb)

Competition history
- First win: 1985, 34th Lombard RAC Rally
- Last win: 1986, Olympus Rally
| Entries | Wins |
|---|---|
| 12 (WRC) | 5 (WRC) |

The Lancia Delta S4 (also known by its Abarth project code SE038) is a Group B rally car manufactured by Lancia. The Delta S4 competed in the World Rally Championship in 1985 and 1986, until Group B class was disbanded and the cars were eventually banned from competition by the FIA. The car replaced, and was an evolution of, the 037. The S4 took full advantage of the Group B regulations, and featured a midship-mounted engine and all-wheel drive for superior traction on loose surfaces.

A total of 28 complete chassis were manufactured.

== Specifications ==
The car's 1,759 cc (1.8 L) Inline-four engine combined supercharging and turbocharging to reduce turbo lag at low engine speeds (rpm). The twincharged system was a development of the 037 engine that generated 325 hp (242 kW) with a supercharger only. An engine capacity multiple of 1.4 was applied to forced induction engines by the FIA and the choice of 1,759 cc (1.8 L) put the S4 in the under 2,500 cc class, which allowed for a minimum weight of 890 kg (1,962 lb).

The engine generated a maximum output of 490 PS (360 kW; 483 hp) but some sources even claim that the engine was capable of generating 500 PS (368 kW; 493 hp).

Like Peugeot's earlier 205 T16, the mid-engine Lancia Delta S4 was a silhouette race car (for marketing purposes), and shared virtually nothing in terms of construction with the production front-engine Delta. The chassis was a tubular space frame construction much like the 037. It featured long travel double wishbone suspension front and rear, with a single large coil over at the front along with a separate spring and twin shock absorbers at the rear. The bodywork was made of a carbon fibre composite with front and rear bodywork fully detachable for fast replacement due to accident damage, allowing ease of access during on-event servicing. The bodywork featured several aerodynamic aids including bonnet opening behind the front-mounted water radiator with Gurney flap, front splitter and winglets moulded into the front bumper panel, flexible front skirt, and rear deck lid wing that featured both a full aerofoil wind section twinned with a deflection spoiler. The door construction style was brought from the 037 with a hollow shell all-Kevlar construction that had no inner door skin, no door handle or window winder. The door was opened with a small loop and the windows were fixed perspex with small sliding panels to allow ventilation and passing of time cards.

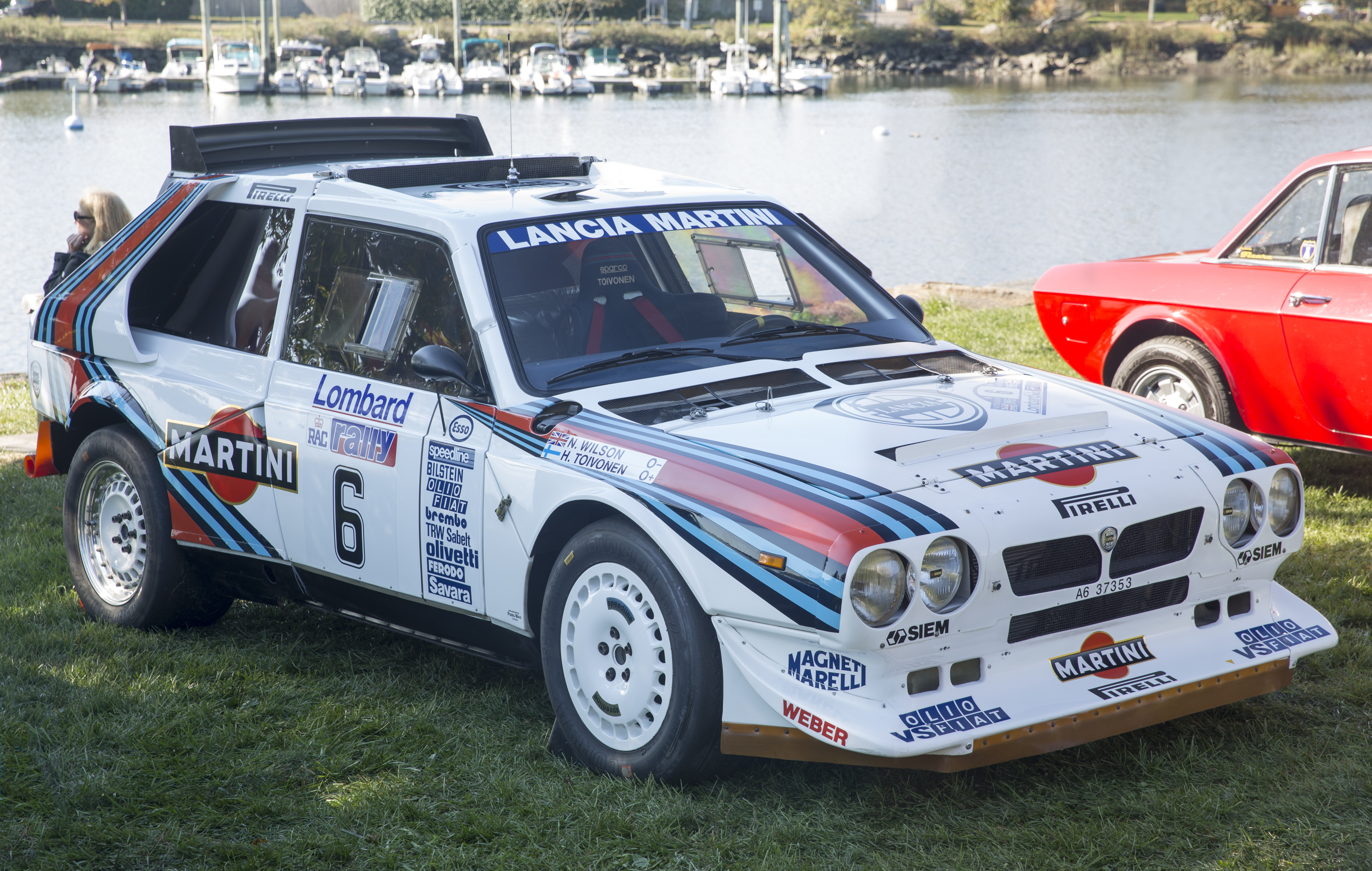
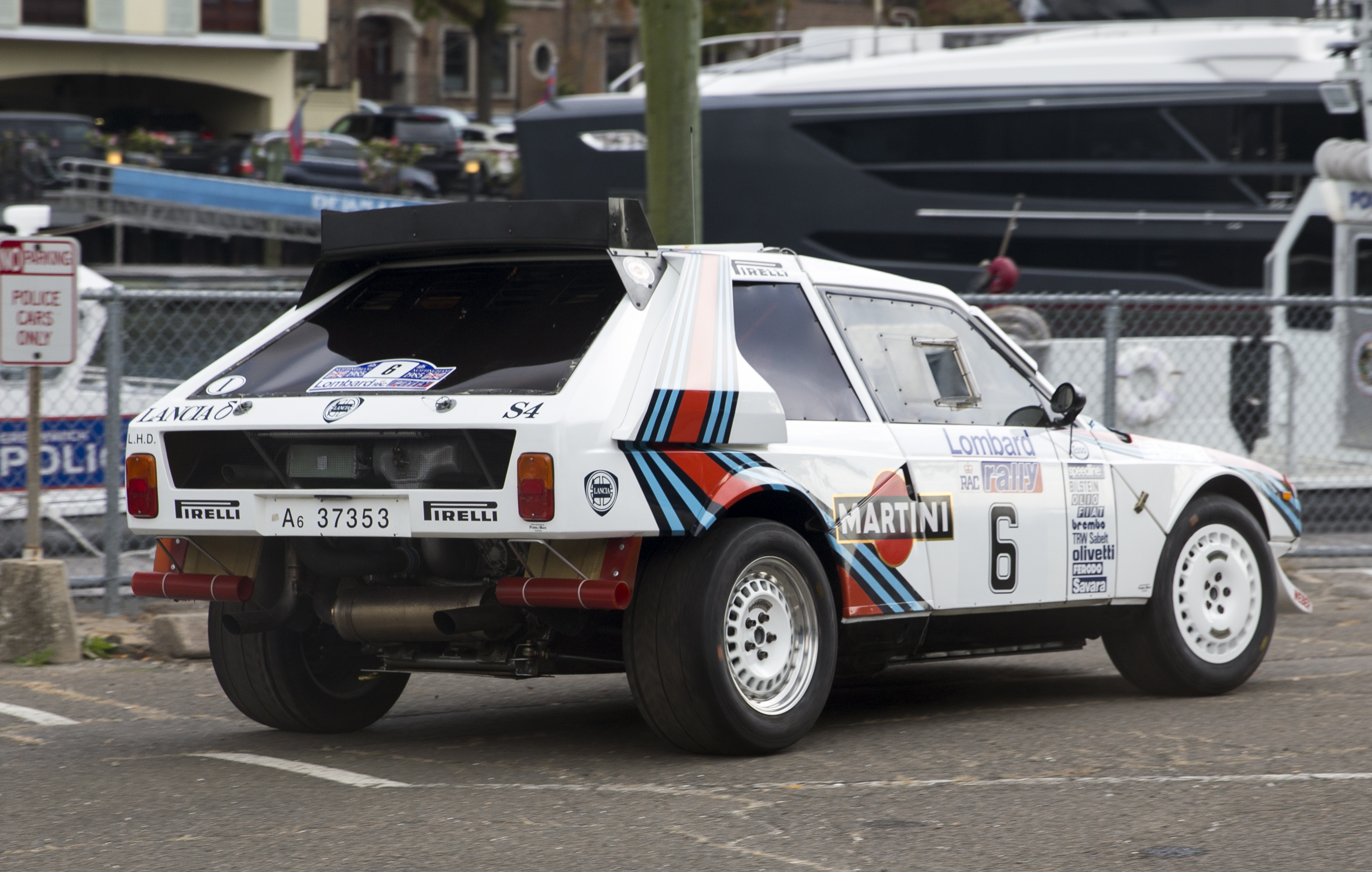
Delta S4 Gr.B

The all-wheel drive system, developed in cooperation with English company Hewland, featured a centre differential which allowed for 60-75% of the torque to go to the rear wheels. The transmission was a 5-speed also developed by Hewland.

The Group S Lancia ECV was to replace the Delta S4 in the 1987 season but the Group S was scrapped along with Group B and Lancia used the production-derived Delta for the 1987 season.

=== Twincharging ===
The method of turbocharging and supercharging an engine is referred to as twincharging. The Delta S4 was the first example of this technology. The Delta S4 had a comparatively large Kühnle, Kopp & Kausch 27 turbocharger with a boost threshold of 4500 rpm. The turbo technology of the time had quite marked boost thresholds, with little or no response below this. This is sometimes mistaken for turbo lag. This phenomenon, known as boost threshold, negatively affects driveability, an important aspect of any car. The Abarth Volumex R18 supercharger was the twin of the turbo, providing low to mid range boost and improving engine response and driveability of the S4. Superchargers do not suffer from lag as they are powered directly from the engine's crankshaft, rather than by the exhaust gases. However, because of this direct mechanical connection, the supercharger presents a significant parasitic load to the engine at higher engine speeds. Lancia designed their twincharger system so the supercharger provides instantaneous boost in the lower range, switching to the turbocharger for more efficient operation at higher engine speeds.

== Delta S4 "Stradale" ==
Lancia Delta S4 "Stradale"
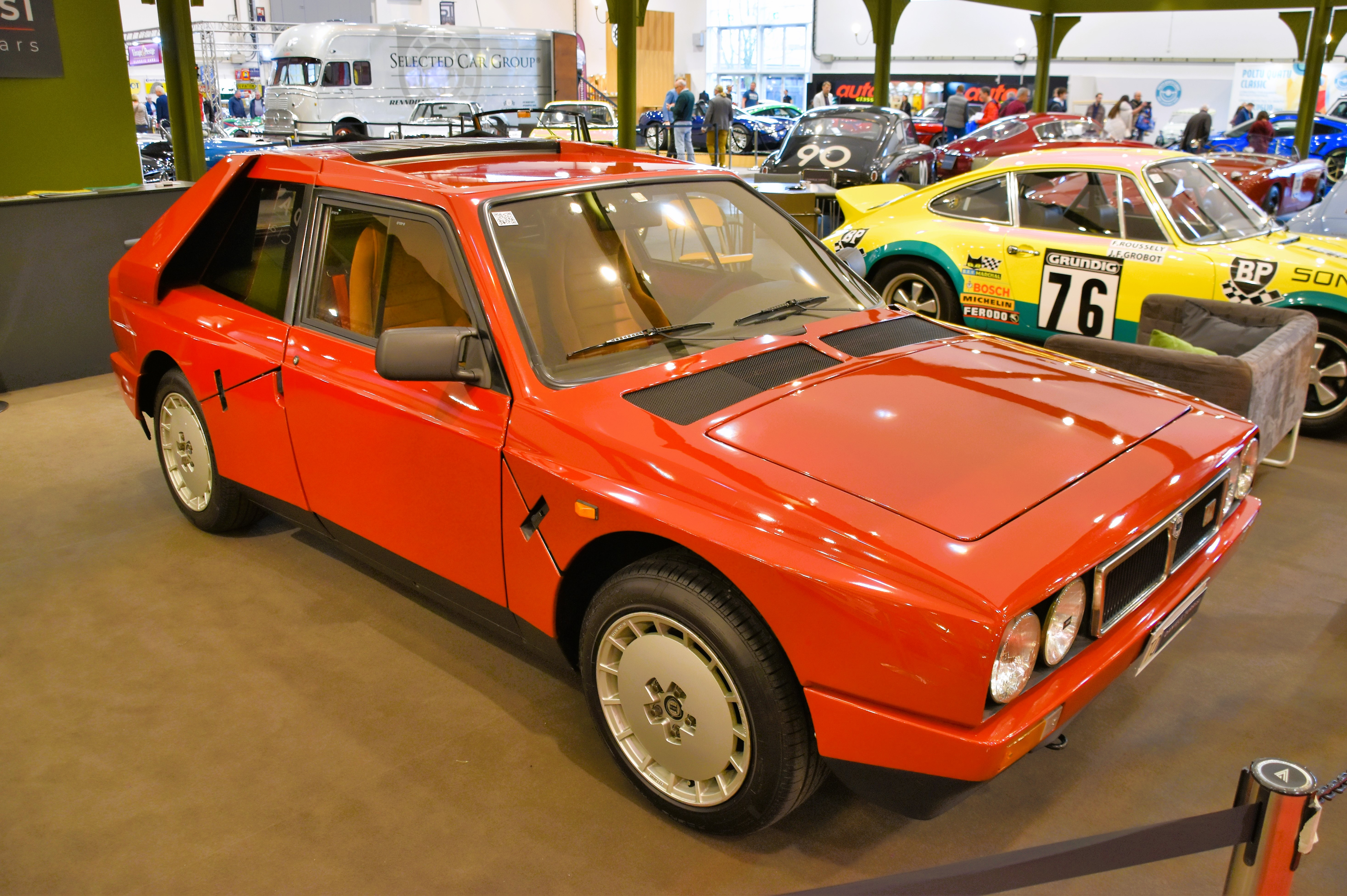

Overview
- Manufacturer: Fiat Auto
- Production: 1985–1986 (200 made)

Body and chassis
- Body style: 2-door coupé
- Layout: Mid-engine, four-wheel-drive

Powertrain
- Engine: Lancia 233 ATR 18S 1.8 L I4 (supercharged and turbocharged petrol)
- Transmission: 5-speed manual

Dimensions
- Length: 4,005 mm (157.7 in)
- Kerb weight: 1,200 kg (2,646 lb)

Chronology
- Predecessor: Lancia Rally 037 "Stradale"

Between October 1985 and 1986 Lancia, in keeping with Group B racing regulations, was to have built 200 of a road-going version of the Delta S4, officially named Lancia Delta S4 but widely known as "Stradale", for the purpose of homologation in Group B, but it is more likely that fewer than 100 were actually built. In Italy, the car was priced at about 100 million Lira: five times the price of the most expensive Delta of the time, the HF Turbo.

The Stradale's chassis was a space frame, similar to its rally counterpart, built out of CrMo steel tubes and aluminium alloy for the crash structures; it was covered by epoxy and fiberglass body panels. Like the rally car, the 1.8-litre four-cylinder engine was longitudinally mid-mounted, equipped with Weber-Marelli IAW integrated electronic ignition and fuel injection, a supercharger, a turbocharger and two intercoolers. In road tune the 1.8 produced 250 PS (184 kW; 247 hp) at 6750 rpm and 291 N⋅m (215 lb⋅ft) of torque at 4500 rpm. The "Stradale" kept a three differential four-wheel-drive system from the rally car; the centre differential sent 30% of the engine torque to the front open differential, and 70% to the rear limited-slip. The transmission remained a 5-speed but was a fully-synchronized unit built by CIMA.

Lancia claimed the car could reach a top speed of 225 km/h (140 mph) and accelerate from standstill to 100 km/h (62 mph) in 6.0 seconds. In contrast to its bare bones racing sister, the S4 Stradale featured an Alcantara-upholstered interior, sound deadening, a suede steering wheel, and was equipped with power steering, trip computer and air conditioning. While racing versions were built by Abarth, the Stradales were built by Torinese coachbuilders Savio.

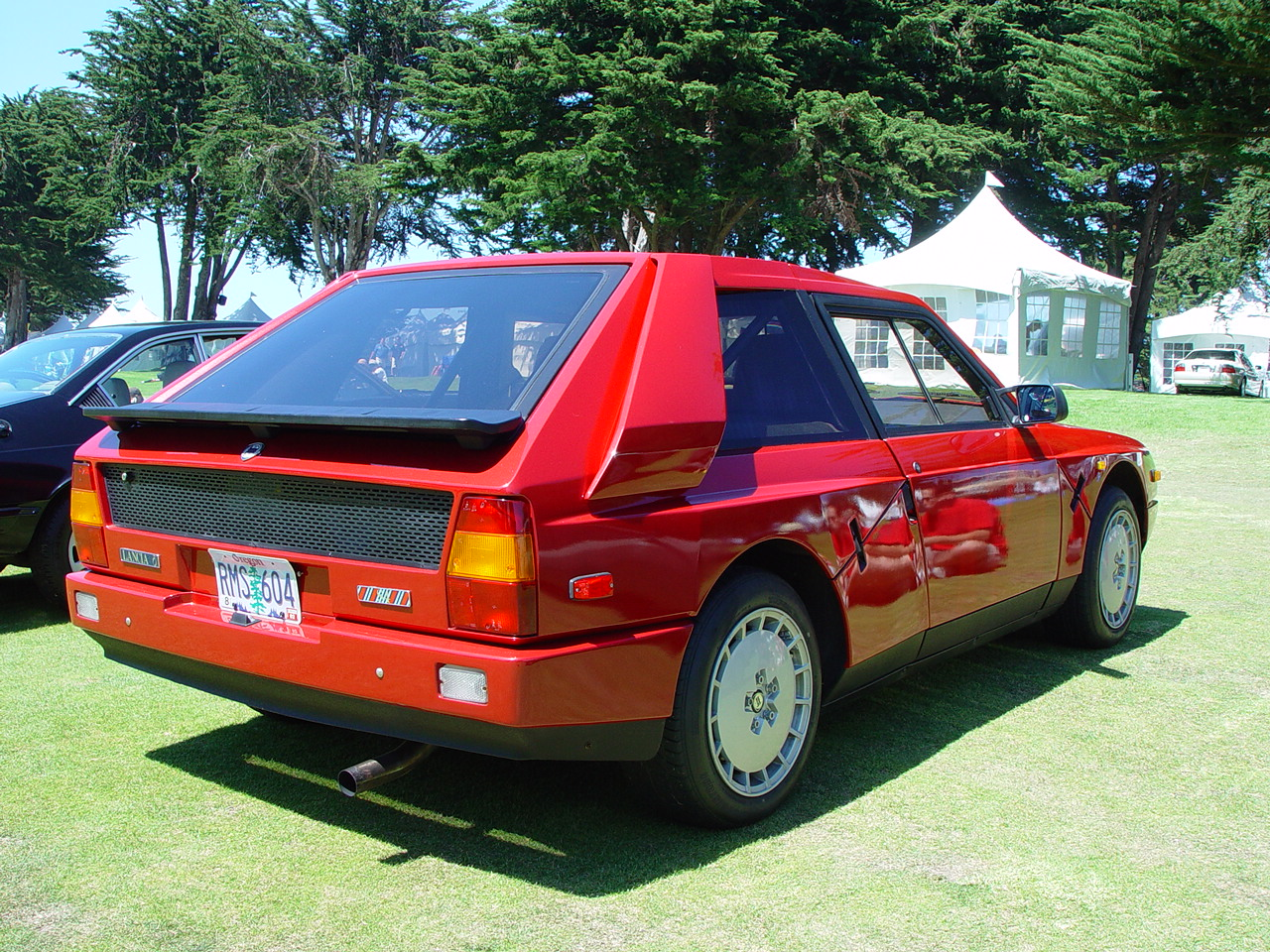
Rear view of an S4 "Stradale".

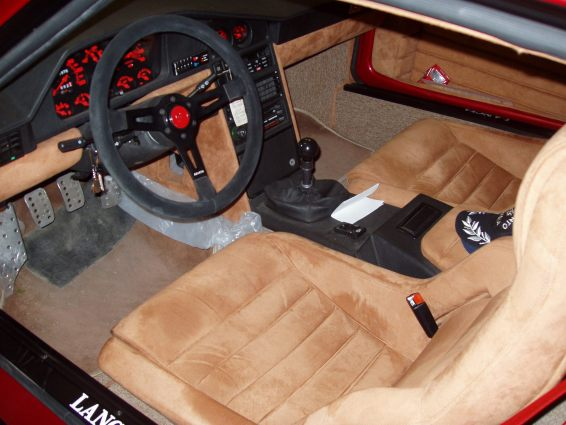
S4 "Stradale" interior.

== Motorsport ==
In competition, the car won its first event, the 1985 RAC Rally in the hands of Henri Toivonen and carried Markku Alén to second in the drivers' championship the following year. For two weeks after the end of the 1986 season Alen was champion until the FIA annulled the results of the Sanremo Rally due to irregular technical scrutineering. Alén had won that event and the loss of points handed the title to Peugeot's Juha Kankkunen. All told, in 1986 there were three wins for the Delta S4 (San Remo not included). The Monte Carlo Rally by Toivonen, Rally Argentina by Massimo Biasion and the Olympus Rally by Alén. The car also won the 1986 European Rally Championship with Italian driver Fabrizio Tabaton, whose car was run by Italian team HF GRIFONE in ESSO livery. The factory supported Jolly Club team also ran cars in Totip livery, one of which was for Dario Cerrato. The car competed at every rally that year except for the extremely demanding and gruelling Safari Rally in Kenya, where Lancia decided that the Delta S4 was not developed enough for that event, so they decided to use the older 037 for Alen, Biasion and three local drivers who were regulars in the event.

The car's legacy was tainted by the fatal crash of Toivonen and co-driver Sergio Cresto on the 1986 Tour de Corse, where the Finnish driver inexplicably missed a tight left-hand hairpin bend and plunged into a ravine. The car burst into flames immediately, killing both of the crew. The accident led directly to the abolition of Group B.

=== WRC victories ===
| No. | Event | Season | Driver | Co-driver |
|---|---|---|---|---|
| 1 | (United Kingdom) 34th Lombard RAC Rally | 1985 | (Finland) Henri Toivonen | (United Kingdom) Neil Wilson |
| 2 | (Monaco) 54ème Rallye Automobile de Monte-Carlo | 1986 | (Finland) Henri Toivonen | (United States) Sergio Cresto |
| 3 | 6º Marlboro Rally Argentina | 1986 | (Italy) Miki Biasion | (Italy) Tiziano Siviero |
| 4 | (Italy) 28º Rallye Sanremo* | 1986 | (Finland) Markku Alén | (Finland) Ilkka Kivimäki |
| 5 | (United States) 21st Olympus Rally | 1986 | (Finland) Markku Alén | (Finland) Ilkka Kivimäki |
* The results of the Rally of Sanremo 1986 were canceled, the points were not included in the championship.

=== Complete results in the World Rally Championship ===
| Season | Team | Drivers | 1 | 2 | 3 | 4 | 5 | 6 | 7 | 8 | 9 | 10 | 11 | 12 | 13 | Pos | Points |
|---|---|---|---|---|---|---|---|---|---|---|---|---|---|---|---|---|---|
| 1985 | Martini Racing | | MON | SWE | POR | KEN | FRA | GRE | NZL | ARG | FIN | ITA | CIV | GBR | | 3 | 70 |
| 1985 | Martini Racing | (Finland) Markku Alén | | | | | | | | | | | | 2 | | 3 | 70 |
| 1985 | Martini Racing | (Finland) Henri Toivonen | | | | | | | | | | | | 1 | | 3 | 70 |
| 1986 | Martini Lancia | | MON | SWE | POR | KEN | FRA | GRE | NZL | ARG | FIN | CIV | ITA | GBR | USA | 2 | 122 |
| 1986 | Martini Lancia | (Finland) Markku Alén | DNF | 2 | DNF | | DNF | DNF | 2 | 2 | 3 | | 1* | 2 | 1 | 2 | 122 |
| 1986 | Martini Lancia | (Finland) Henri Toivonen | 1 | DNF | DNF | | DNF | | | | | | | | | 2 | 122 |
| 1986 | Martini Lancia | (Italy) Miki Biasion | DNF | | DNF | | DNF | 2 | 3 | 1 | | | 3* | | | 2 | 122 |
| 1986 | Martini Lancia | (Sweden) Mikael Ericsson | | | | | | DNF | 4 | | 5 | | | DNF | | 2 | 122 |
| 1986 | Martini Lancia | (Argentina) Jorge Recalde | | | | | | | | 4 | | | | | | 2 | 122 |
| 1986 | Martini Lancia | (Sweden) Kalle Grundel | | | | | | | | | 6 | | | | | 2 | 122 |
| 1986 | Martini Lancia | (Italy) Dario Cerrato | | | | | | | | | | | 2* | | | 2 | 122 |
* The results of the Rally of Sanremo 1986 were canceled, the points were not included in the championship.
