= Lancia Rally 037 =

Mid-engine rally car

Lancia Rally
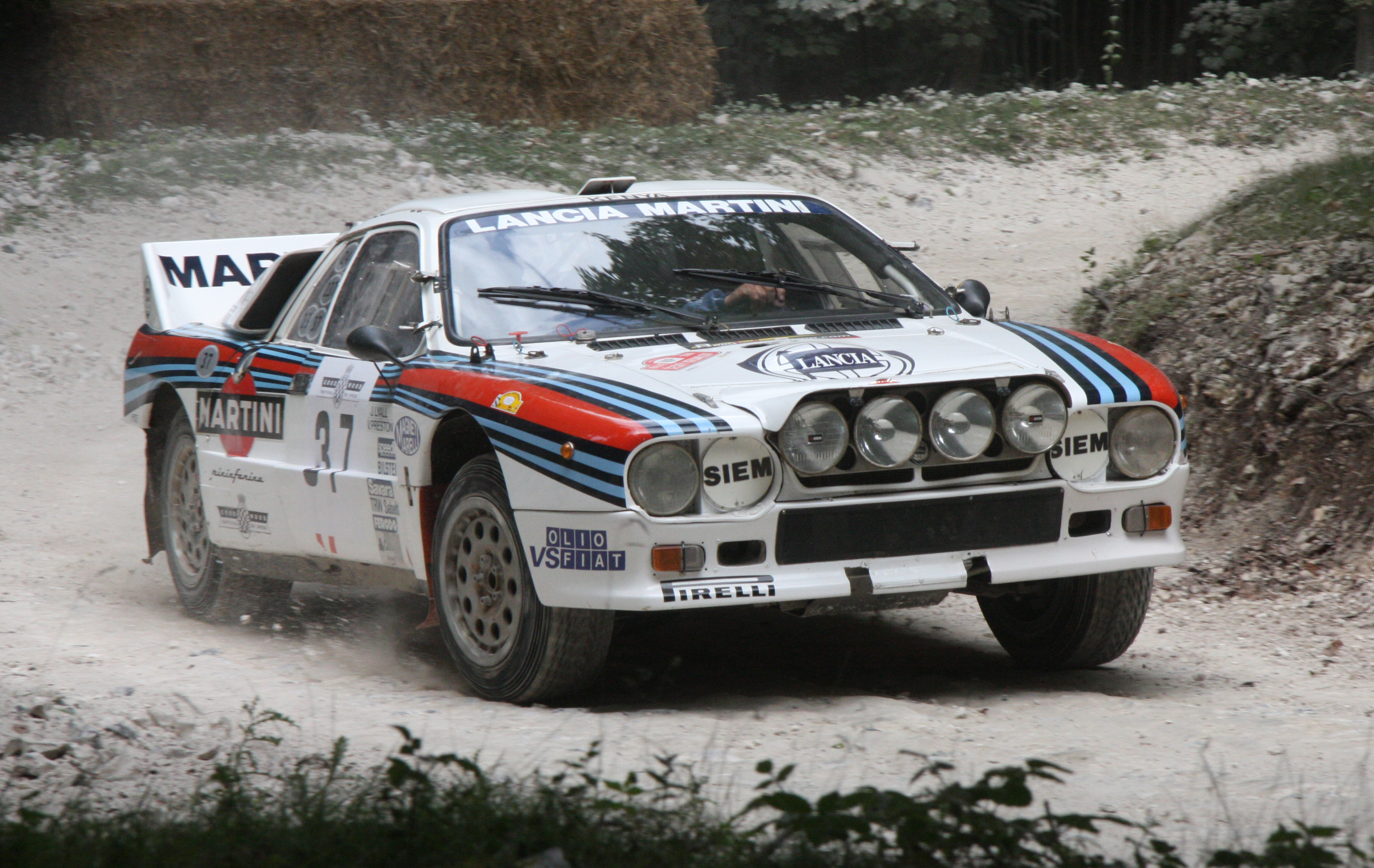
- Category: Group B
- Constructor: Fiat Auto
- Designers: Enrico Fumia at Pininfarina (styling); Sergio Limone (project leader); Pier Paolo Messori (technical director)
- Predecessor: Lancia Stratos; Fiat 131 Abarth
- Successor: Lancia Delta S4

Technical specifications
- Chassis: Steel central monocoque, tubular steel subframes front and rear, aluminium roll cage
- Suspension (front): Double wishbone, coil springs, Bilstein gas dampers, anti-roll bar
- Suspension (rear): Double wishbone, coil springs, dual dampers
- Length: 3,915 mm (154.1 in)
- Width: 1,850 mm (72.8 in)
- Height: 1,245 mm (49.0 in)
- Axle track: 1,508 mm (59.4 in) front 1,490 mm (58.7 in) rear
- Wheelbase: 2,440 mm (96.1 in)
- Engine: Tipo 232 AR4 2.0-litre (Stradale, Evo 1); 2.1-litre (Evo 2) I4 DOHC 16v Volumex supercharger rear, mid-mounted
- Transmission: ZF 5 forward + 1 reverse manual Abarth-ZF locking differential
- Weight: 960 kg (2,116 lb)
- Brakes: 300 mm (11.8 in) vented discs
- Tyres: Pirelli P7 Corsa
- Clutch: 230 mm (9.1 in) Valeo single dry plate

Competition history
- Notable entrants: (Italy) Martini Racing (Italy) H.F. Grifone (Italy) Jolly Club
- Notable drivers: (Italy) Attilio Bettega (Germany) Walter Röhrl (Finland) Markku Alén
- Debut: 1982 Monte Carlo Rally
Races	Wins	Poles	F/Laps
62	6	N/A	N/A
- Constructors' Championships: 1
- Drivers' Championships: 0

The Lancia Rally (homologated as 151 ARO and also known as the Lancia 037 for its Abarth project code of SE 037) is a mid-engine rally car built in the early 1980s to race in the Fédération Internationale de l'Automobile (FIA) Group B World Rally Championship. Three versions of the car were built; the original version, in both racing and Stradale road car trim, and the Evoluzione 1 (Evo 1) and Evoluzione 2 (Evo 2) racing cars. The 037 won the manufacturers' world championship for Lancia in the 1983 season. It was the first car built specifically to race in Group B, and was the last rear-wheel drive car to win the WRC.

== History ==
=== X1/8 ===
The origins of the Lancia Rally 037 go back to the late 1960s and early 1970s, when Fiat was evaluating proposals from two carrozzieri for new mid-engined car models. Bertone's successful proposal was for a small car based loosely on their Autobianchi A112 Runabout, which went into production as the Fiat X1/9. Pininfarina's proposal, called the X1/8, was for a mid-sized coupé with a V6 engine. The X1/8 is the original progenitor of the Lancia Rally.

By January 1971, two X1/8 prototypes had been completed. At the time, Fiat had two V6 engines in their inventory: the 65° DOHC Ferrari Dino V6 designed by Vittorio Jano that Fiat was producing for Ferrari and which they had already used in their own Fiat Dino and would later install in the Lancia Stratos, and the 60° SOHC V6 designed by Aurelio Lampredi for the Fiat 130 sedan and coupé.

=== X1/20 ===
In 1972, Fiat revisited the X1/8 project, changing the name to X1/20 to reflect the displacement of the 2.0-litre Lampredi-designed Fiat Twin Cam engine that replaced the V6. At least twenty X1/20 prototypes were built before the car debuted at the 1975 Geneva International Motor Show as the Lancia Beta Montecarlo.

=== Abarth SE 030 ===
One year prior to the Montecarlo's debut, a track-prepared car based on an early X1/20 prototype appeared. Built by Abarth, it was called the Fiat Abarth 030.

At Fiat's request, Pininfarina supplied two steel X1/20 shells to Abarth. Abarth stripped the old body, and replaced it with one with shorter overhangs and a bonnet that was considerably lower in front, leaving the rectangular headlamps in front wings now much higher than the bonnet. Below the headlamps on each side were two additional spotlamps. The car's track was greatly widened, necessitating the addition of wide fender flares. Behind the driver, a large intake snorkel rose above the roof.

Abarth opted to use the 3.2-litre V6 from the Fiat 130. The base engine received a new crankshaft, connecting rods and camshafts, as well as big-valve cylinder heads and three Weber 48 IDF downdraught carburettors. The engine was fitted with a dry-sump.

The standard bore of 102 mm was kept, but Abarth increased the stroke to 71 mm, resulting in a displacement of 3481 cc. Power was raised to 285 bhp (213 kW) at 6000 rpm.

Abarth mounted the engine behind the driver and passenger, and mated it with a five-speed ZF 5DS-25 gearbox with limited-slip differential. Several references says that the engine was mounted longitudinally, while one says it was mounted transversely.

One of the two SE 030s was entered in the 1974 Giro d'Italia automobilistico. Driven by the team of Giorgio Pianta and Christine Beckers, it managed a creditable second place behind a Lancia Stratos. The other chassis remained a development mule.

=== Group 5 Montecarlo Turbo ===
In 1978 Lancia introduced their Group 5 Montecarlo Turbo for the FIA's Group 5 class that ran from 1976 to 1982.

The Montecarlo Turbo is a silhouette racing car whose appearance evokes that of the production Beta Montecarlo, but with extensive changes to the chassis, powertrain, and bodywork.

Italian racing car manufacturer Dallara was retained to develop the chassis of the car, which only kept the central passenger cell of the Montecarlo, while new subframes of steel tube were added front and rear using jigs created by Dallara. Suspension at each wheel used a McPherson strut. New bodywork was developed by Pininfarina. In compliance with the Group 5 rules, the roof and door skins were retained from the Montecarlo body, although the roof panel was now aluminium.

The engine, still mounted transversely in the chassis, is a version of Fiat's Twin Cam developed by Abarth, with a new multivalve cylinder head and displacement reduced to be able to compete in different classes. Forced induction was provided by the same model of KKK turbocharger that Porsche had used in their 3.0-litre 934. The magnesium gearbox held a gearset made by Colotti.

The FIA classified Group 5 cars as either over or under 2-litres, and set minimum vehicle weights based on displacement. Three engines sizes are reported for the Montecarlo Turbo: 1,425.9 cc (87.01 cu in), 1,429.4 cc (87.23 cu in) and 1,773 cc (108.20 cu in). Applying the 1.4× equivalency factor for forced induction, the effective displacements of these engines are 1,996.3 cc (121.82 cu in), 2,001.2 cc (122.12 cu in) and 2,482.2 cc (151.47 cu in).

The Group 5 Montecarlo Turbo won the 2-litre class in 1979, and took the World Championships for Makes in 1980 and 1981. Montecarlos Turbos finished 1-2 at the Giro d'Italia automobilistico in 1980.

=== Beta Montecarlo Giro d'Italia ===
Some sources mention another car called the Beta Montecarlo Giro d'Italia, which they report competed in the named race, and was powered by an engine with a Volumex supercharger.

At the 1979 Giro, the driving team of Markku Alén, Ricardo Patrese, Walter Röhrl, and Gilles Villeneuve raced a modified Group 5 Turbo with shortened bodywork that some have speculated was a transition between the Group 5 and Group B Lancias, but this car's 1425 cc Group 5 engine was boosted by a KKK turbocharger.

At the following year's Giro, the team of Michele Alboreto, Attilio Bettega, and Arnaldo Bernacchini raced a 2-litre car registered as a Lancia Beta Montecarlo Volumex.

=== Return to rallying ===
Lancia had won the WRC manufacturers titles in 1972 with the Fulvia, and in 1974, 1975, and 1976 with the Stratos. In 1977, 1978, and 1980 parent company Fiat won with the Fiat 131 Abarth.

The FIA announced changes to the rally classes that would go into effect for the 1982 season. The changes, detailed in FIA Appendix J, replaced the former numeric group classifications with three alphabetic classes: Groups A, B, and N. A significant change was the reduction in the number of cars that had to be built to qualify for homologation from 400 to 200.

The first prototype 037 appeared in 1980. The car was targeted at the new Group B class, and was designed to comply with the new Appendix J rules.

=== People ===
Key persons involved in the development of the Lancia Rally included:

- Cesare Fiorio, a founder and head of Lancia HF Squadra Corse and originator of the project.
- Aurelio Lampredi - Fiat group engine designer.
- Enrico Fumia - Pininfarina designer.
- Sergio Limone - Abarth's chief project engineer for the 037.
- Pier Paolo Messori Abarth's technical director and Limone's successor.
- Claudio Lombardi - Lancia design and development engineer.

=== Prototype ===
Prototype SE 037-001 was completed on 23 September 1980.

Abarth, by then a part of the Fiat conglomerate, did most of the design work, and the car eventually became known by its Abarth project number of 037.

Construction was done by Dallara, who still had the jigs for the Group 5 car. Bodywork was provided by CBC of Turin. The body shape is unmistakably Montecarlo, but the outer two headlamps are mounted slightly lower than the inner two, and the bonnet line is different. Instead of using Montecarlo taillamps, SE 037-001 used assemblies from the Ferrari 308 GTB/GTS.

Extensive testing of the car's aerodynamics was done in Pininfarina's wind tunnel, including some runs with a tire strapped to the roof.

=== Debut ===
The Lancia Rally was officially unveiled at the 1982 Turin Auto show. That same year, Martini Racing, a division of Italian beverage company Martini & Rossi, became the official sponsor of Lancia's rally team, which began using the company's colour scheme on the cars. Running from 1982 to 1992, this turned into one of the most enduring and successful sponsorships in auto racing history.

Production of the 037 ran from 1982 to 1984.

== Predecessors gallery ==
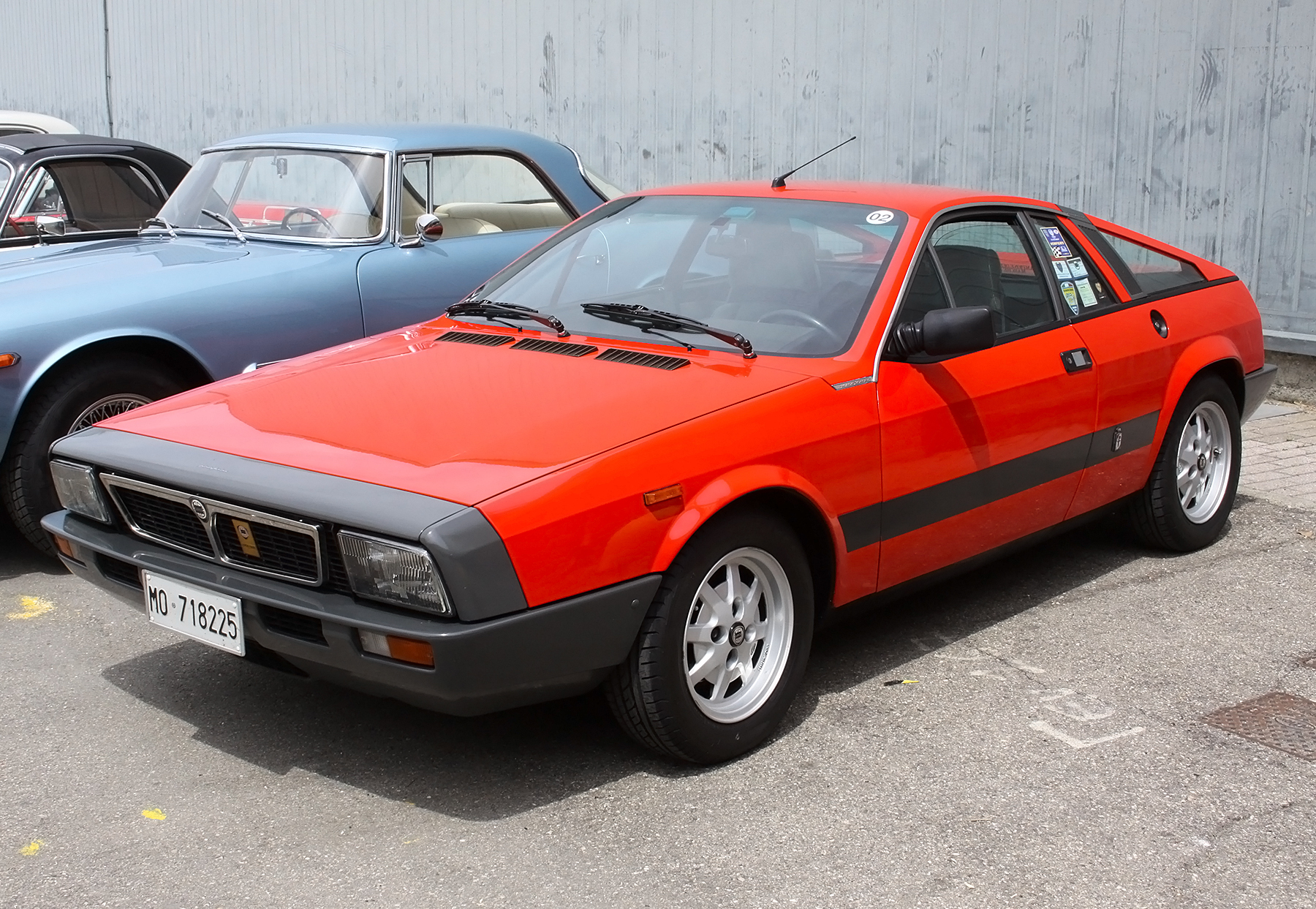
1975 Lancia Beta Montecarlo

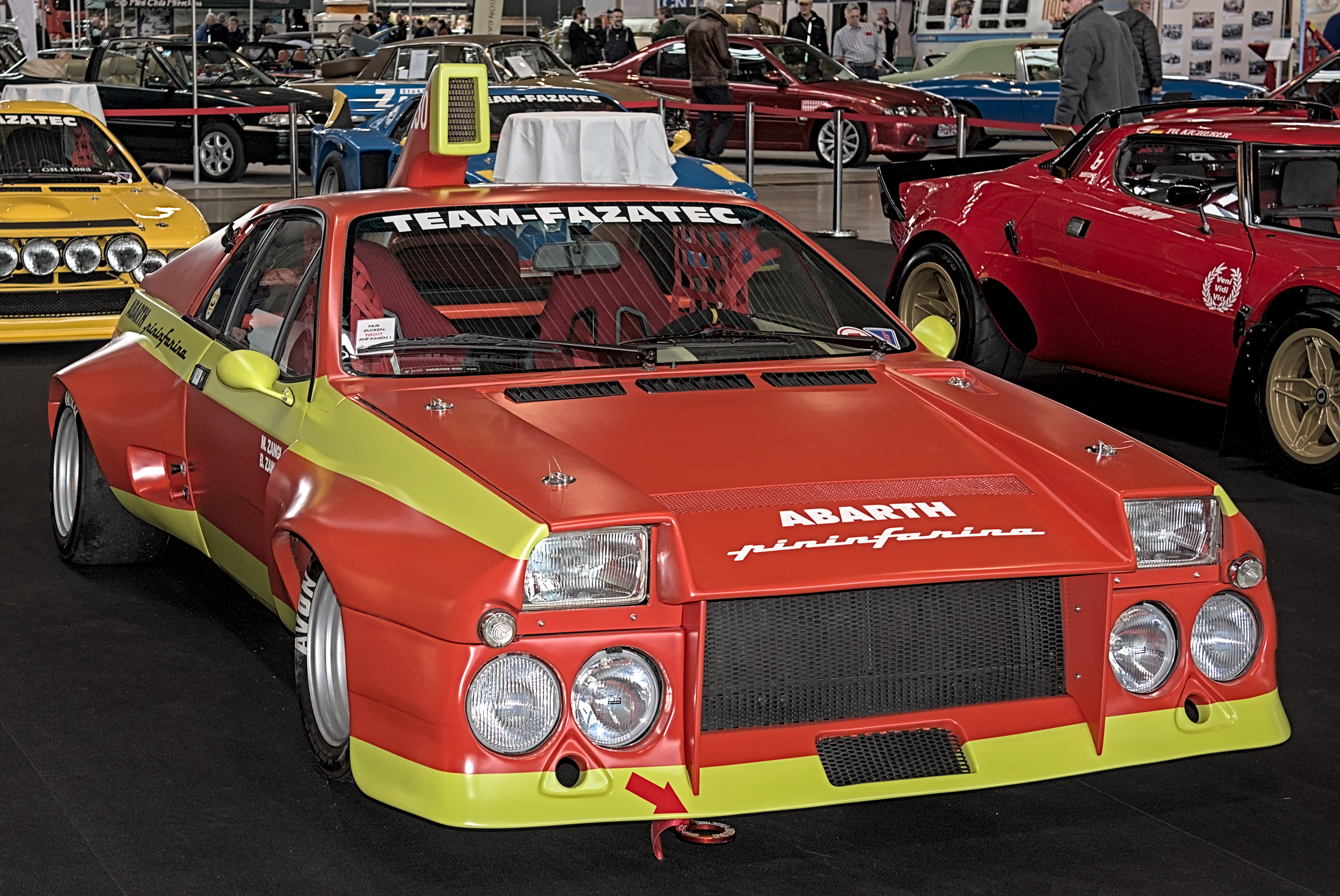
Abarth SE 030 front

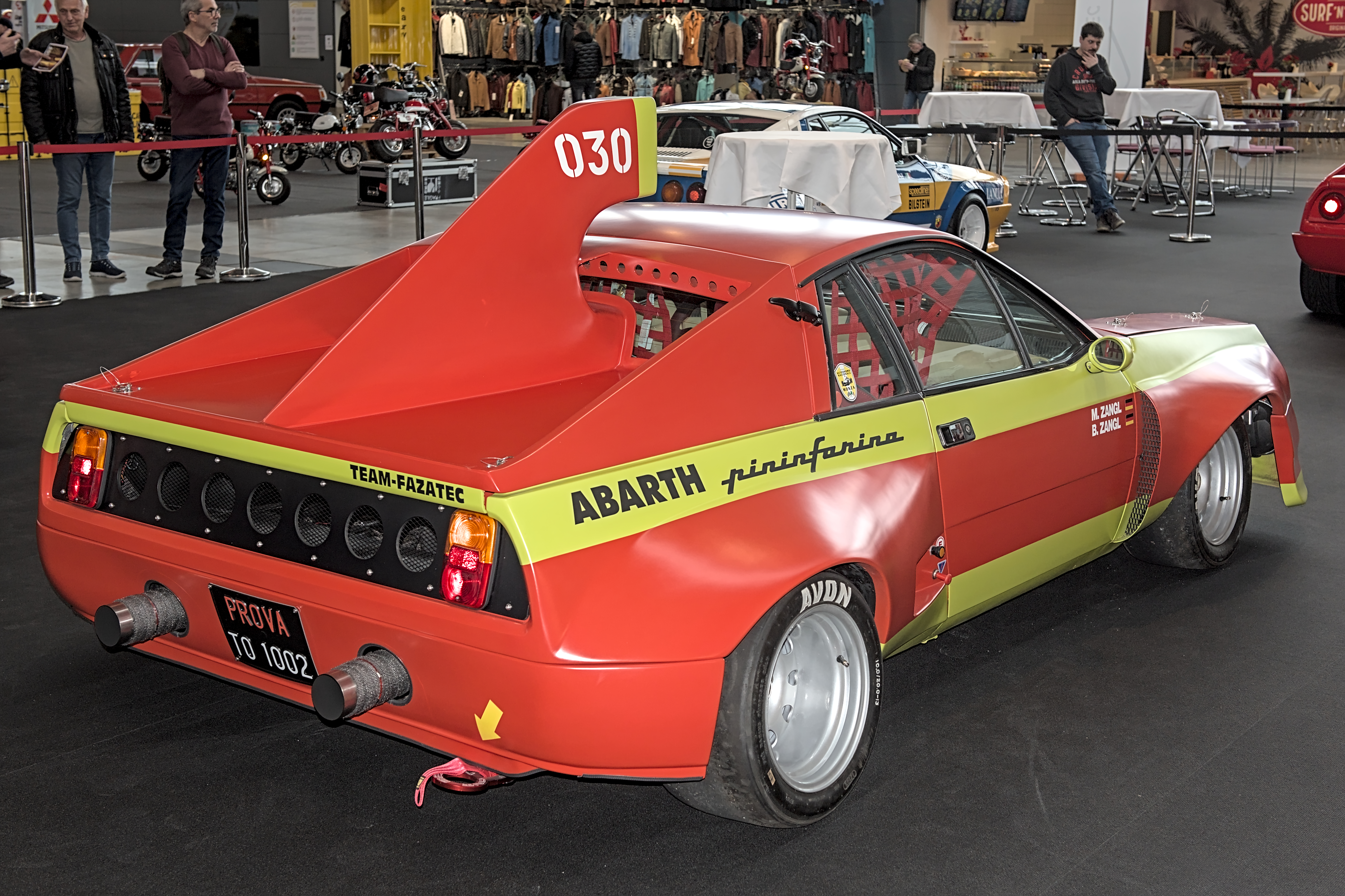
Abarth SE 030 rear

Group 5 Lancia Montecarlo Turbo

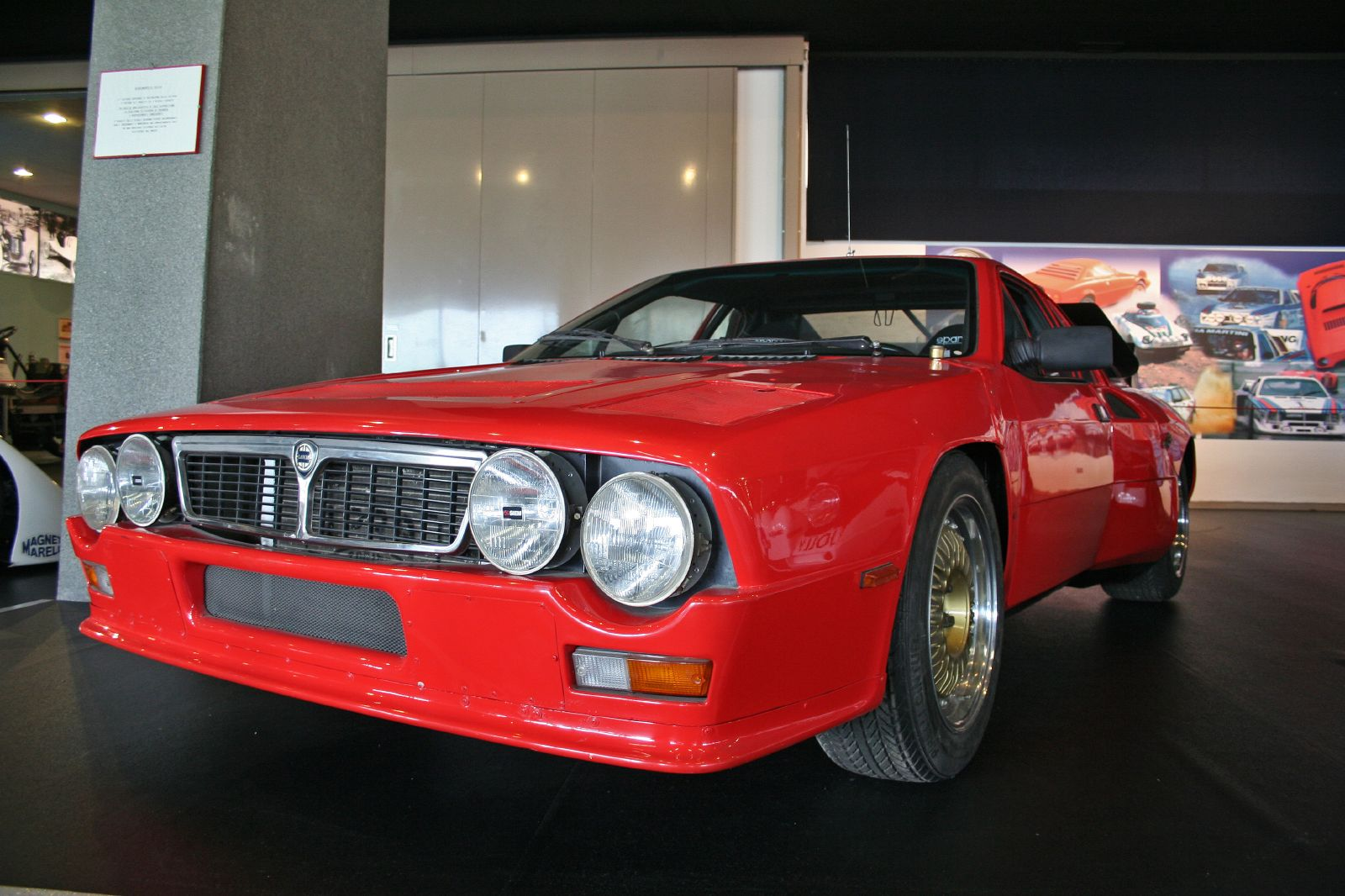
Abarth SE 037-001 front

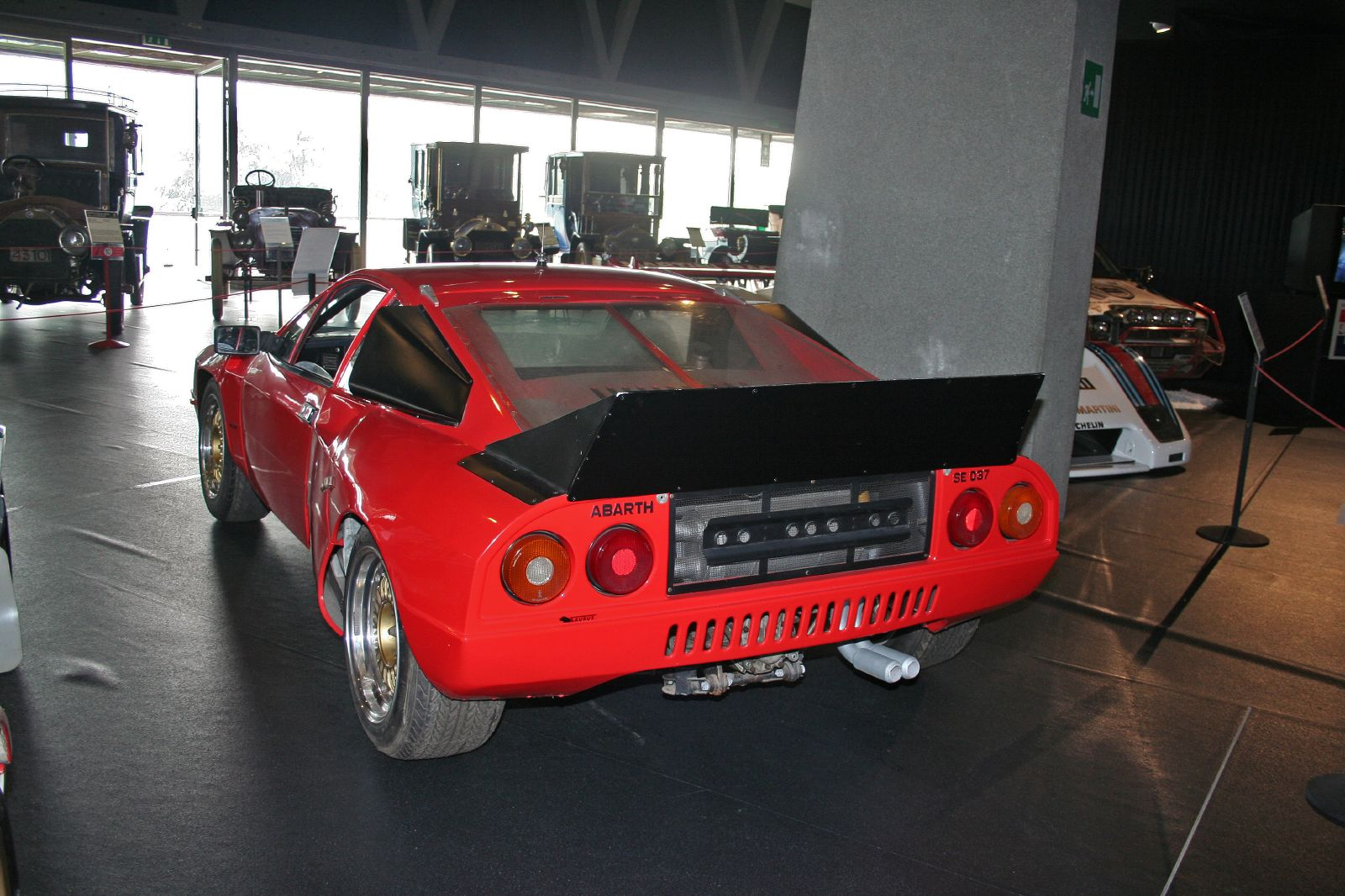
Abarth SE 037-001 rear

== Features ==
=== Powertrain ===
The 037 is powered by a Tipo 232 AR4 straight-four engine designed by Lampredi. Based on the engine used in the Fiat Abarth 131 Rally cars, in the 037 it is fitted with a Volumex Roots-type supercharger. Lampredi chose a supercharger over a turbocharger to eliminate turbo lag and improve throttle response.

The cast iron block is a long-stroke Fiat Twin Cam assembly with the same bore and stroke as the 8-valve Twin Cam in the Volumex-equipped versions of the Lancia Beta and Lancia Trevi, and the aluminium 16-valve head was carried over from the 131 Abarth, but with the 131's twin carburetors replaced by a single large Weber carburetor in early models, and by Bosch/Kugelfischer mechanical fuel injection in later ones.

The 037 features a 5-speed manual ZF gearbox and an Abarth-ZF locking differential.

=== Body and chassis ===
The 037 shared no body panels with the Montecarlo, and those on the race car were made from polyester resin with fire retardant, reinforced with glass fibre, Kevlar, or carbon fibre, using progressively lighter and stronger materials over the course of the car's production life.

The chassis of the Lancia Rally was derived from that of the Lancia Montecarlo road car. The central structural cell comprising the driver and passenger space was carried over, while all new tubular steel subframes were added; one in the front to carry the suspension, radiator, and steering, and one in the rear to carry the engine, transmission, and suspension.

The donor chassis used was from the Montecarlo Spider, whose open top allowed the use of a "double-bubble" roof for increased head clearance for the helmeted driver and navigator.

Like the Montecarlo, the 037 is mid-engined but, unlike its Montecarlo forebear, in the rally car the engine is mounted longitudinally. This allowed greater freedom in the design of the suspension while moving engine weight forward.

=== Running gear ===
While often described as a double wishbone suspension, at both the front and rear the lower suspension element is made up of multiple links.

In the front, the suspension consists of an upper wishbone, lower lateral arm and compliance link, and coil-over-damper. In the rear, the car is suspended on an upper wishbone, lower reversed tubular wishbone and compliance link, coil spring, with dual dampers flanking the coil spring to deal with the heat produced running the rally stages.

== Model variants ==
=== Stradale ===
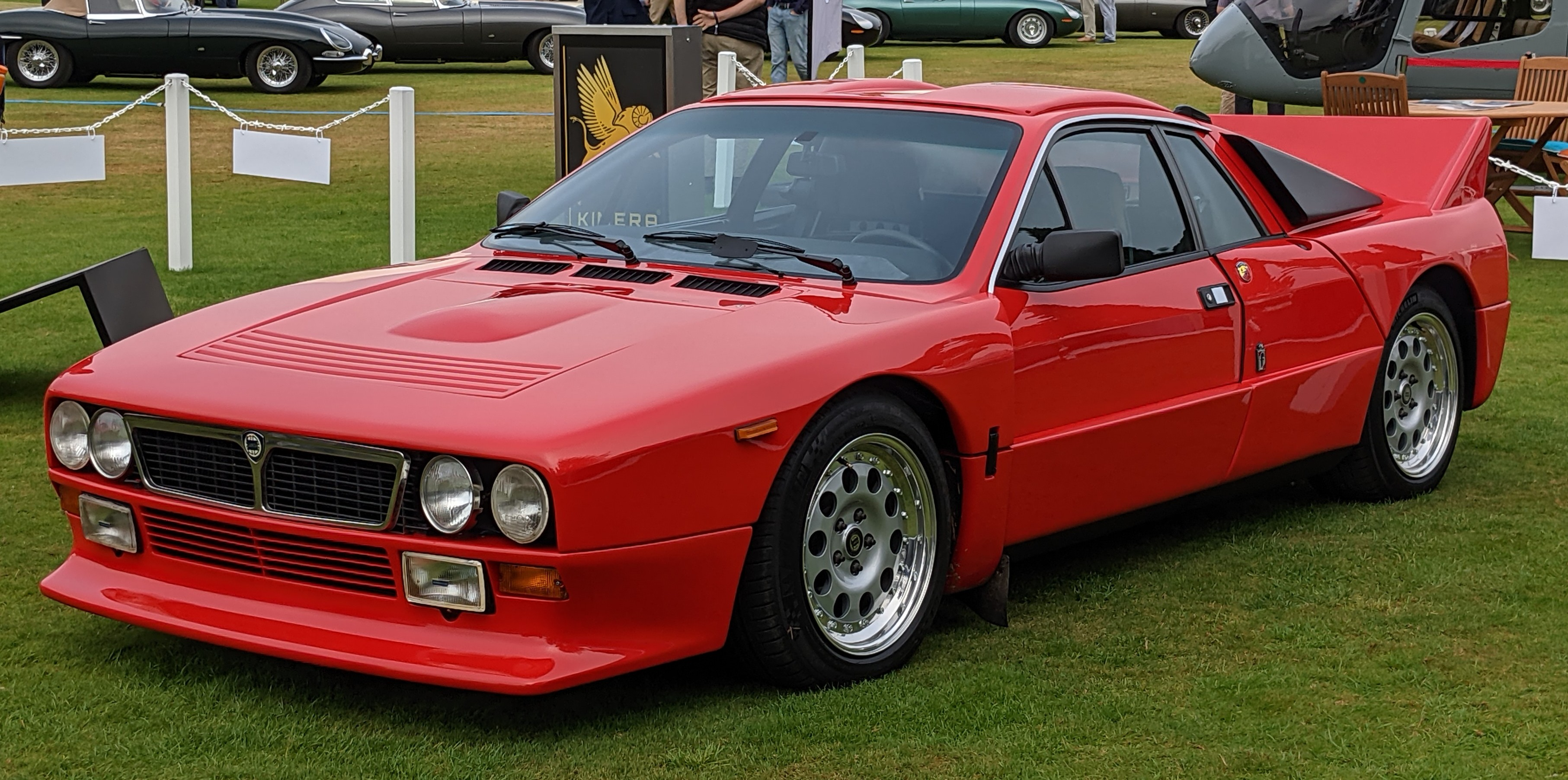
Stradale front three-quarter view

Stradale rear three-quarter view

The early road-going Stradale model was built to qualify for homologation.

Estimates of the number of first-run cars, including Stradales and prototypes, varies from 207 to 222 produced.

The engine in the Stradale received the smaller Volumex Abarth Tipo R10 supercharger, and was carburetted. Engine output is 205 hp (151 kW) at 7,000 rpm and 166 lb⋅ft (225 N⋅m) of torque at 5000 rpm. This engine was capable of pushing the car to over 220 km/h (137 mph) and to 60 mph (97 km/h) from a standstill in 7.0 seconds.

=== Evoluzione 1 and Evoluzione 2 ===
The Group B rules allowed for the development of "Evolution" ("Evoluzione" in Italian) models. Manufacturers could qualify for homologation with an initial batch of 200 cars, and then make major changes to the original that could be homologated by building an additional 20 examples. The Lancia team homologated two evolutions of the original Lancia Rally — the Evo 1 and Evo 2, and built 20 examples of each in compliance with the new Group B rules.

The Evo 1s received new Brembo brake calipers, reinforced wheel hubs and suspension arms, and lighter crankshaft and flywheel. While the Stradale used the same taillamp assemblies as the Montecarlo, in the Evos these were replaced by simple round lamps and lenses.

Evo cars received a larger Volumex Abarth Tipo R18 supercharger. Early Evo 1s were carburetted, while later Evo 1s and all Evo 2 cars had Bosch/Kugelfischer mechanical fuel injection.

Power output of the first Evo 1s was quoted at 265 hp (195 kW) but was increased to 280 hp (206 kW).

In the Evoluzione 2, displacement was increased to 2111 cubic centimetres, bringing its effective displacement to 2955 cubic centimetres after applying the 1.4x compensation factor for engines with forced induction, keeping it under the class limit of 3000 cubic centimetres.

In addition to the larger R18 supercharger, maximum boost pressure in the Evo 2 was raised to 1 bar (15 psi), and water injection was added to cool the intake charge. These changes combined to raise power to 325 hp (239 kW).

== Motorsports ==
The Lancia Rally made its competition debut at the 1982 Rally Costa Smeralda in Italy, where two cars were entered but both retired due to gearbox issues. These two cars were not Evoluziones, but rather were versions of the original homologation spec, and were essentially race-prepared Stradale models. One reference calls the 21 racing cars built in April 1982 the "Gara" (Italian for "competition") version.

Pre-Evo models were also run in the car's first WRC event, in the tarmac stages of that year's Tour de Corse.

The first Evoluzione 1 cars were homologated in August 1982. Their debut race was the Rali da Madeira.

The 1982 season was plagued with retirements for the 037, but the car did manage to post several wins, including its first win at the Pace Rally in the UK. The 1983 season was more successful for the 037: Lancia took the 1983 World Rally Championship Constructors' title with Germany's Walter Röhrl and Finland's Markku Alén as principal drivers, despite serious competition from the 4WD Audi Quattro. Both drivers missed the final round of the series, despite Röhrl maintaining a mathematical chance of the drivers' title: the honours instead went to Audi's veteran Finn, Hannu Mikkola.

For the 1984 Constructors' title defence, Lancia introduced the more powerful Evo 2, but this was not enough to stem the tide of 4WD competition, losing to Audi in both 1984 championships and again to the 4WD Peugeot 205 T16 in its final works season in 1985. Alén collected the final 037 win, and the sole victory for the Evo 2 model, in the 1984 Tour De Corse, after which the Lancia Rally was retired in favour of its successor, the supercharged and turbocharged 4WD Delta S4, for the season-ending RAC Rally in Great Britain. Driver Attilio Bettega died in an 037 crash in 1985. António Rodrigues won the 1984 Falperra International Hill Climb in an 037. The 037 made its final appearance in the 1986 edition of the Safari Rally by the Martini Lancia team, when it was entered in place of the Delta S4 that the team fielded in the other rallies that year, due to the team running out of time to develop the S4 for the rally.

In addition to the 1983 World Championship, the 037 also won the European Rally Championship titles in 1983, 1984, and 1985, won the Italian Championship titles in 1983 and 1985, and won the Open title in 1984.

Cars were supplied, not only to the factory Martini team, but to private factory-backed teams like the Jolly Club with drivers Andrea Zanussi and Tonino Tognana, and the H.F. Grifone team. Jolly Club 037 drivers Adartico Vudafieri and Michele Rayneri were Italian Rally Champions in 1984 and 1987 respectively. Grifone driver Fabrizio Tabaton won the 1984 Group B Italian Rally Championship.

One ex-works Lancia 037 was entered by ROSS Competition in the third round of the 1994 All Japan Grand Touring Car Championship season. The 037 performed poorly, due to being significantly underpowered compared to its competition in the GT1 (now GT500) class, having a short-ratio five-speed gearbox and an engine not designed run at high engine speeds for sustained periods of time. Naohiro Furuya, who drove the 037 in that race, was able to finish the race in 12th overall and 9th in the GT1 class, albeit 7 laps down from the race-winning Team Taisan Porsche 962C and 3 laps down from the Team Gaikokuya Nissan Skyline that won in the GT2 class.

== Gallery ==
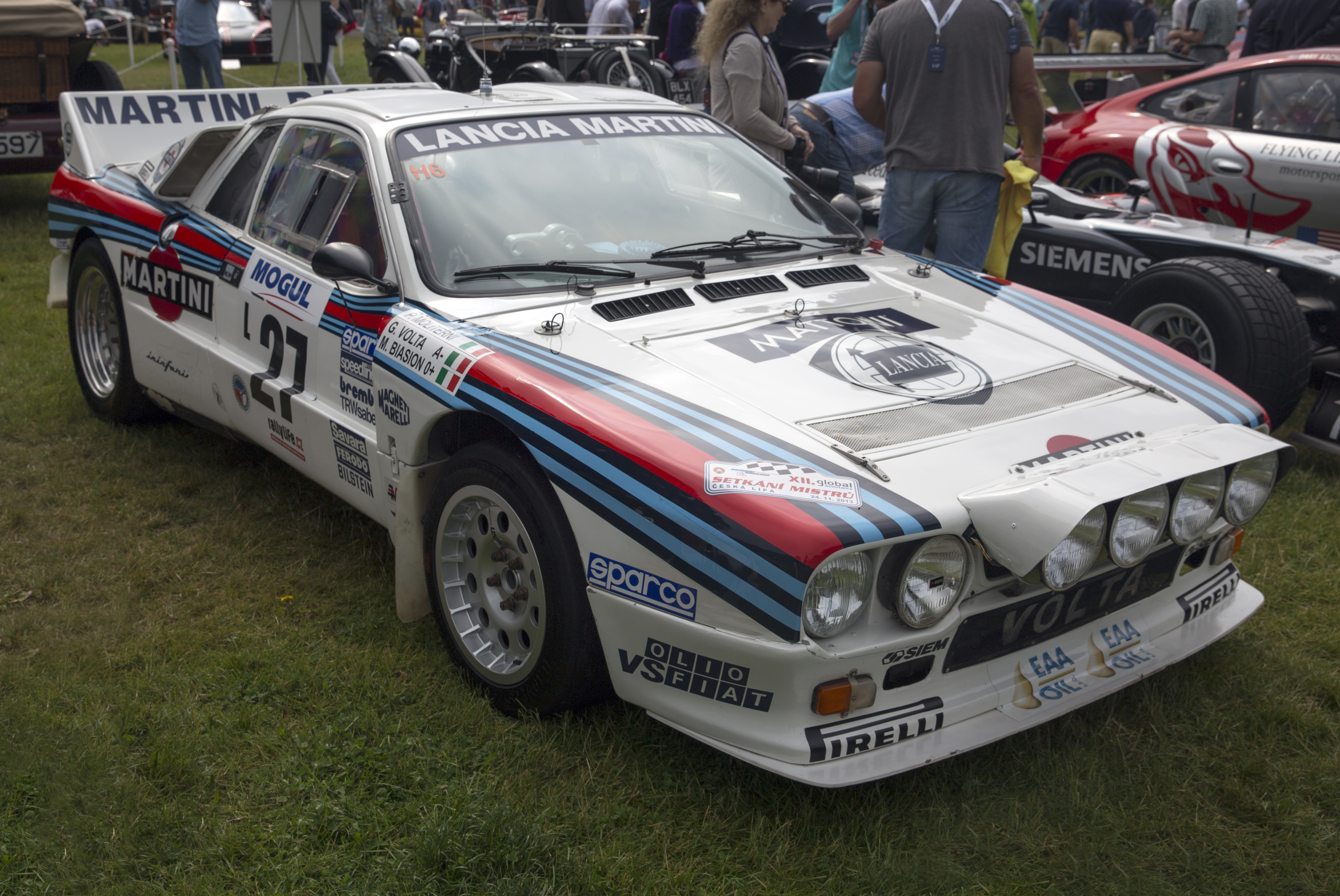
Lancia Rally 037 Evoluzione 2

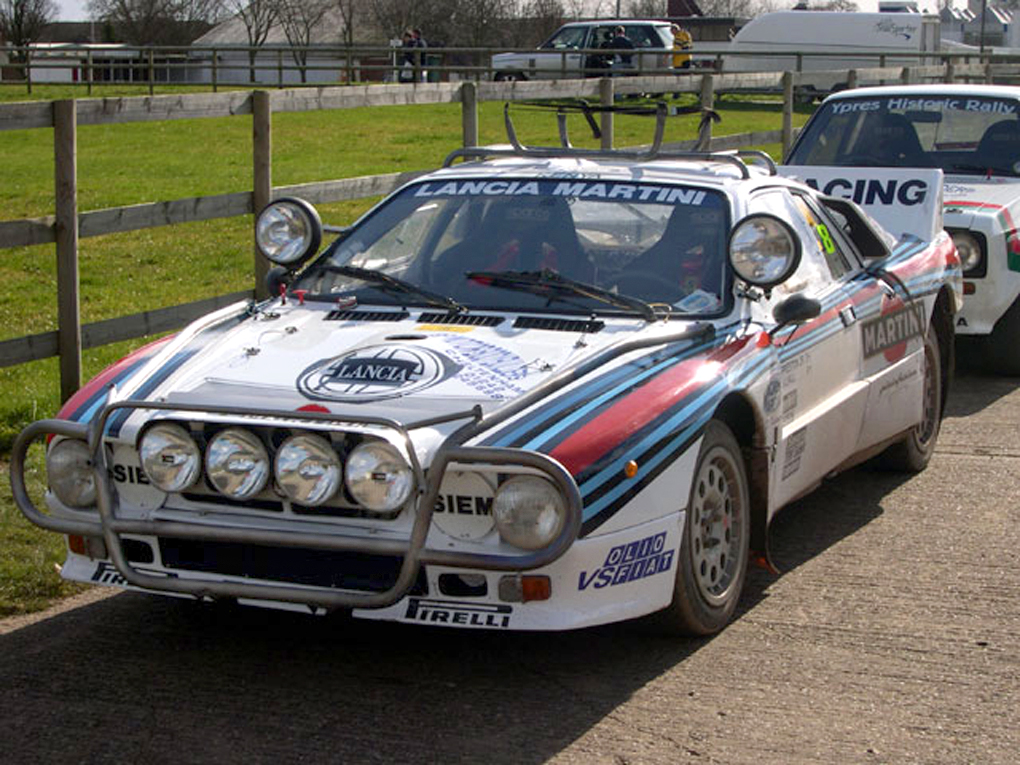
In Safari Rally trim

Rear view

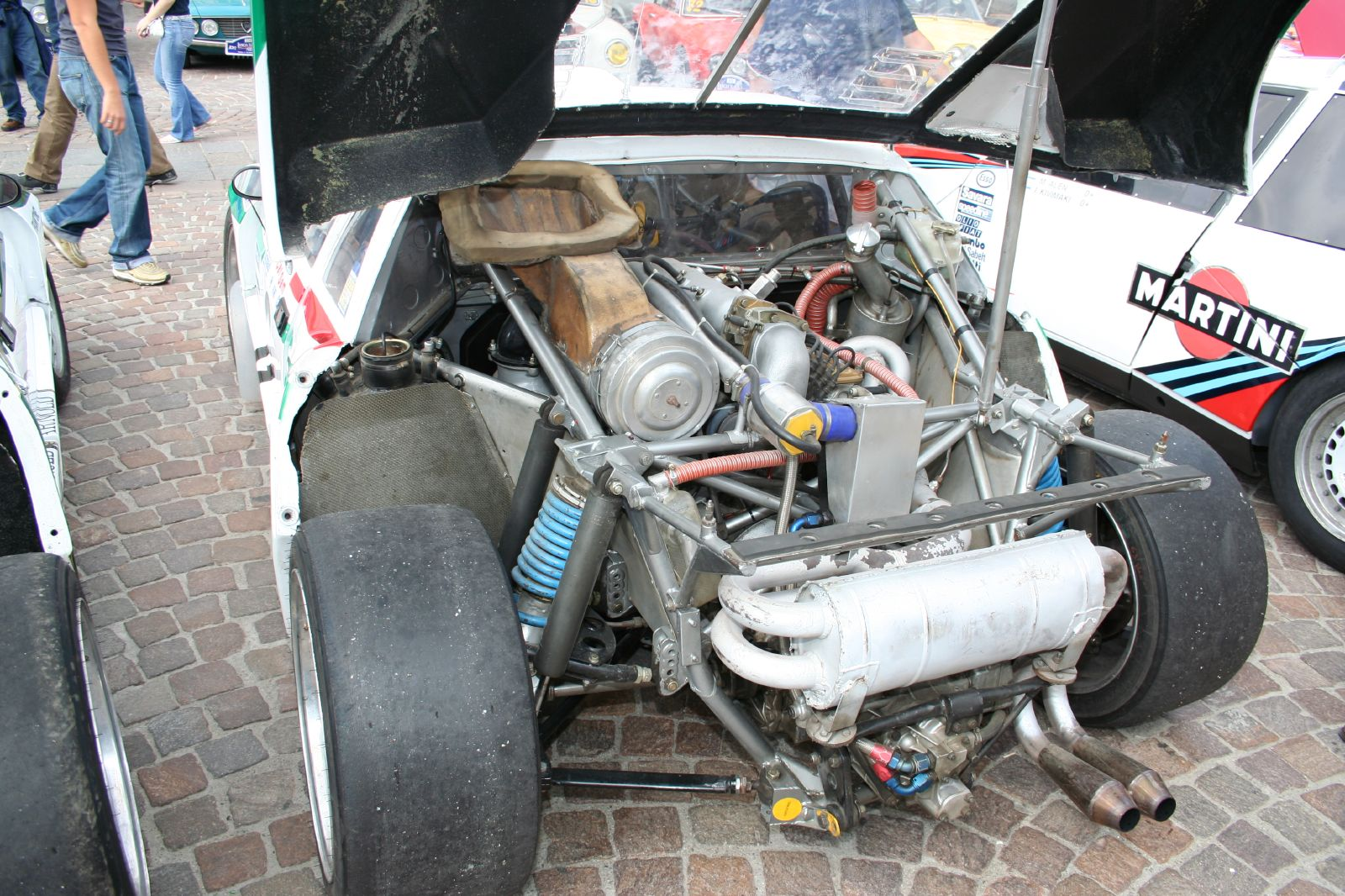
Engine

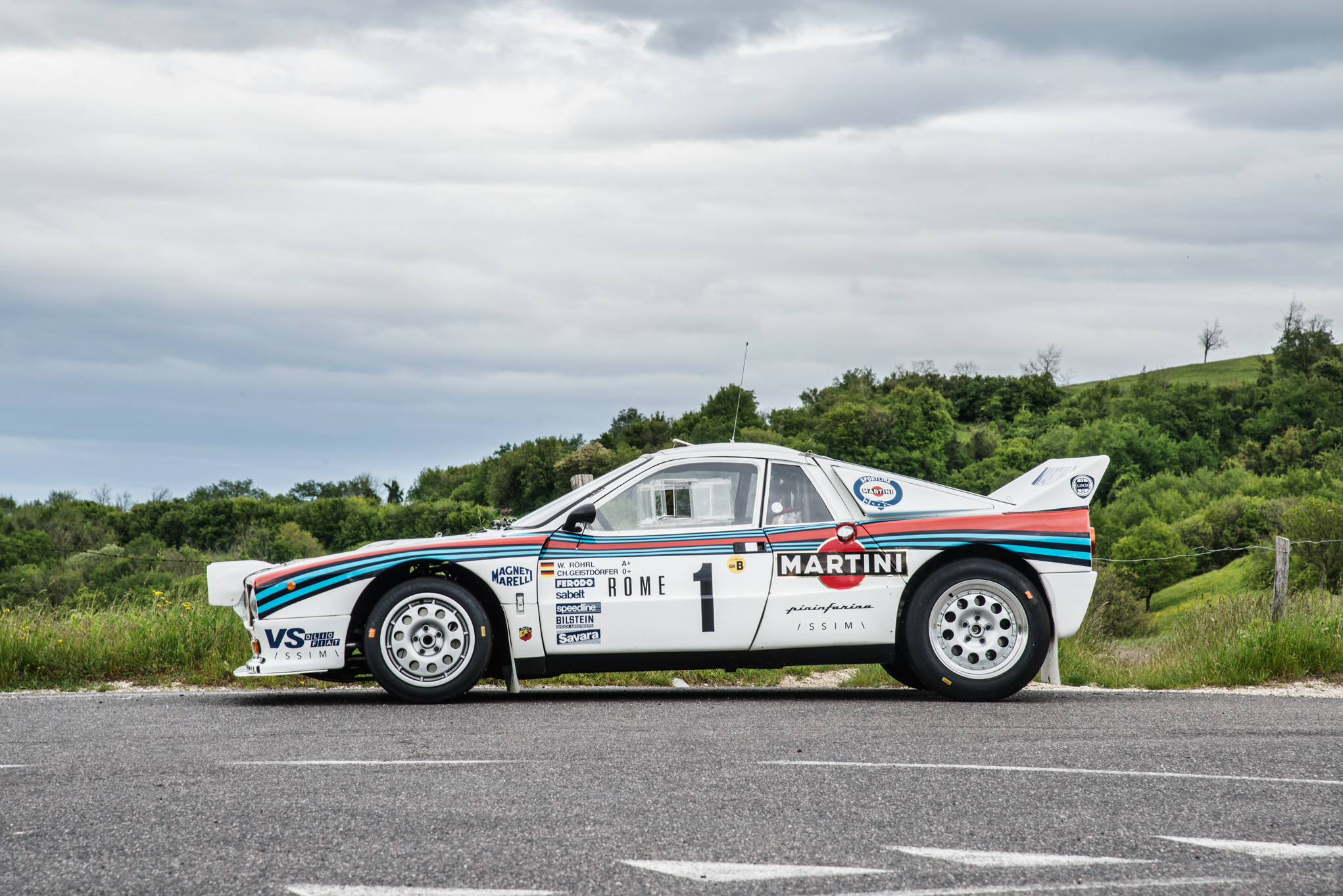
Side elevation

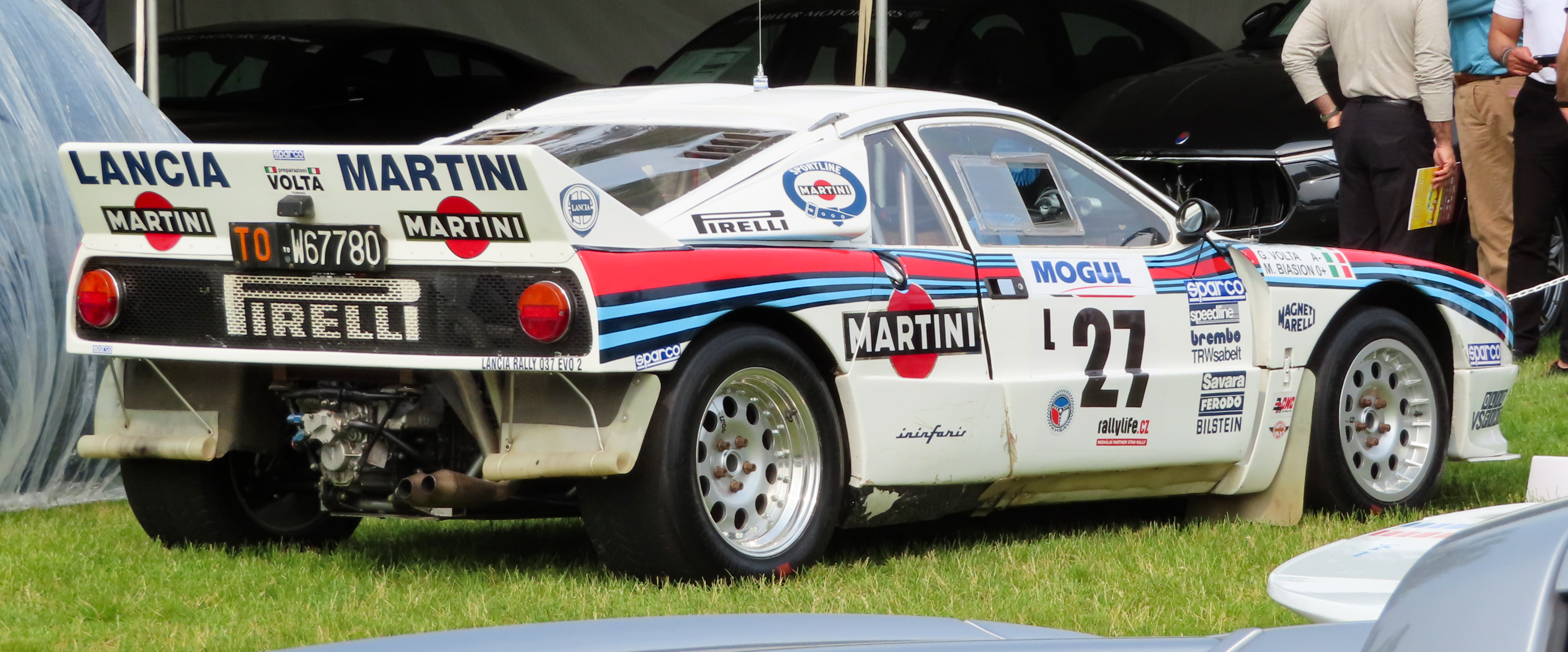
Rear three-quarter view

== Technical data ==
Lancia 037 Technical summary
Feature	Stradale	Evoluzione 1	Evoluzione 2
Body:	Polyester resin with fire retardant, reinforced with glass fibre, Kevlar, or carbon fibre		
Length: Width: Height: Wheelbase:	3,915 mm (154.1 in); 1,850 mm (72.8 in); 1,245 mm (49.0 in); 2,440 mm (96.1 in)		
Track f/r:	1,508 / 1,490 mm (59.4 / 58.7 in)		
Weight:	1,170 kg (2,579 lb)	960 kg (2,116 lb)	
Layout:	Rear mid-engine, rear-wheel-drive layout		
Engine configuration:	Longitudinally-mounted Tipo 232 AR4 I4		
Bore x stroke:	84 mm × 90 mm (3.31 in × 3.54 in)		85 mm × 93 mm (3.3 in × 3.7 in)
Displacement:	2.0 L (1,995 cc; 121.7 cu in)		2.1 L (2,111 cc; 128.8 cu in)
Valvetrain:	Belt-driven DOHC, 4 valves per cylinder		
Air/fuel delivery:	Single Weber 40DCNVH 15/250 twin-choke carburetor	Single Weber 40DCNVH 15/250 twin-choke carburetor (1982); Bosch/Kugelfischer mechanical slide-throttle injection (1983 on)	Bosch/Kugelfischer mechanical slide-throttle injection
Compression ratio:	7.5:1		
Supercharger:	Abarth Volumex R10, 0.6–0.9 bar (8.7–13.1 psi)	Abarth Volumex R18, 0.6–0.9 bar (8.7–13.1 psi)	Abarth Volumex R18, 1.0 bar (15 psi)
Peak power:	205 PS (151 kW; 202 hp) at 7,000 rpm	255–280 PS (188–206 kW; 252–276 hp) at 8,000 rpm	310–325 PS (228–239 kW; 306–321 hp)
Peak torque:	226 N⋅m (167 lb⋅ft) at 5,000 rpm	299 N⋅m (221 lb⋅ft) at 5,000 rpm	333 N⋅m (246 lb⋅ft) at 5,500 rpm
Lubrication:	Dry sump		
Cooling:	Water cooled, pump and radiator		
Ignition:	Marelli AEI 200 A electronic inductive discharge		
Clutch:	230 mm (9.1 in) Valeo single dry plate with metal-ceramic lining. Hydraulic pedal		
Transmission:	ZF 5DS-25 5-speed, plus reverse		
Gear type:	Synchromesh, helical-cut gears	Straight-cut gears, dog clutches	
Gear ratios:	First — 2.417; Second — 1.611; Third — 1.136; Fourth — 0.846; Fifth — 0.704; Reverse — 2.867		
Differential:	ZF-Abarth locking differential		
Final drive ratio:	5.25:1		
Steering:	Rack and pinion steering, 2.8 turns lock-to-lock		
Front suspension:	Upper wishbone, lower lateral arm and compliance link, concentric coil spring and Bilstein gas damper, anti-roll bar		
Rear suspension:	Upper wishbone, lower reversed wishbone and compliance link, coil spring, dual Bilstein gas dampers		
Brakes f/r:	300 mm (11.8 in) vented discs / 300 mm (11.8 in) vented discs		
Wheels:	Speedline 16-inch alloy wheels	Gravel: Speedline 15-inch front alloy wheels front 16-inch alloy wheels rear Asphalt: 16-inch wheels front, 18-inch back	
Tyres:	Pirelli P7 205/55 VR 16	Gravel: 205/50 Pirelli P7 Corsa front 295/60/16 rear	

== Rally results ==
=== World Rally Championship for Manufacturers - results ===
Season	Team	Drivers	1	2	3	4	5	6	7	8	9	10	11	12	13	Pos	Points
1982	Martini Racing		MON	SWE	POR	KEN	FRA	GRE	NZL	BRA	FIN	ITA	CIV	GBR		9	25
1982	Martini Racing	(Finland) Markku Alén					9	NF			NF	NF		4		9	25
1982	Martini Racing	(Italy) Attilio Bettega					NF									9	25
1982	Martini Racing	(Italy) Adartico Vudafieri						NF					NF			9	25
1982	Martini Racing	(Italy) Fabrizio Tabaton										NF				9	25
1983	Martini Racing		MON	SWE	POR	KEN	FRA	GRE	NZL	ARG	FIN	ITA	CIV	GBR		1	118
1983	Martini Racing	(Germany) Walter Röhrl	1		3		2	1	1			2				1	118
1983	Martini Racing	(Finland) Markku Alén	2		4		1	2		5	3	1				1	118
1983	Martini Racing	(France) Jean-Claude Andruet	8				NF									1	118
1983	Martini Racing	(Italy) Attilio Bettega					4	5	3			3				1	118
1983	Martini Racing	(Italy) Adartico Vudafieri			5					NF						1	118
1983	Martini Racing	(Argentina) Francisco Mayorga								NF						1	118
1983	Martini Racing	(Finland) Pentti Airikkala									5					1	118
1984	Martini Racing		MON	SWE	POR	KEN	FRA	GRE	NZL	ARG	FIN	ITA	CIV	GBR		2	108
1984	Martini Racing	(Finland) Markku Alén	8		2	4	1	3	2		2	NF				2	108
1984	Martini Racing	(Italy) Attilio Bettega	5		3		7	4				2				2	108
1984	Martini Racing	(France) Jean-Claude Andruet	NF													2	108
1984	Martini Racing	(Finland) Henri Toivonen			NF			NF			3					2	108
1985	Martini Racing		MON	SWE	POR	KEN	FRA	GRE	NZL	ARG	FIN	ITA	CIV	GBR		3	70
1985	Martini Racing	(Finland) Henri Toivonen	6								4	3				3	70
1985	Martini Racing	(Finland) Markku Alén				NF	NF				3	4				3	70
1985	Martini Racing	(Italy) Attilio Bettega				NF	NF									3	70
1986	Martini Lancia		MON	SWE	POR	KEN	FRA	GRE	NZL	ARG	FIN	CIV	ITA	GBR	USA	2	122
1986	Martini Lancia	(Finland) Markku Alén				3										2	122
1986	Martini Lancia	(Italy) Miki Biasion				NF										2	122
1986	Martini Lancia	(Kenya) Greg Criticos				9										2	122
1986	Martini Lancia	(Kenya) Johnny Hellier				10										2	122
1986	Martini Lancia	(Kenya) Vic Preston Jr				NF										2	122

Notes:

- The Lancia Rally 037 was used during the Safari Rally 1986, instead of the regular Lancia Delta S4.

=== World Rally Championship - rally wins ===
No.	Event	Season	Driver	Co-driver
1	(Monaco) 51éme Rallye Automobile de Monte Carlo	1983	(Germany) Walter Röhrl	(Germany) Christian Geistdörfer
2	(France) 27éme Tour de Corse	1983	(Finland) Markku Alén	(Finland) Ilkka Kivimäki
3	(Greece) 30th Acropolis Rally	1983	(Germany) Walter Röhrl	(Germany) Christian Geistdörfer
4	13th Sanyo Rally of New Zealand	1983	(Germany) Walter Röhrl	(Germany) Christian Geistdörfer
5	(Italy) 25º Rallye Sanremo	1983	(Finland) Markku Alén	(Finland) Ilkka Kivimäki
6	(France) 28éme Tour de Corse	1984	(Finland) Markku Alén	(Finland) Ilkka Kivimäki

== Kimera EVO37 tribute car ==
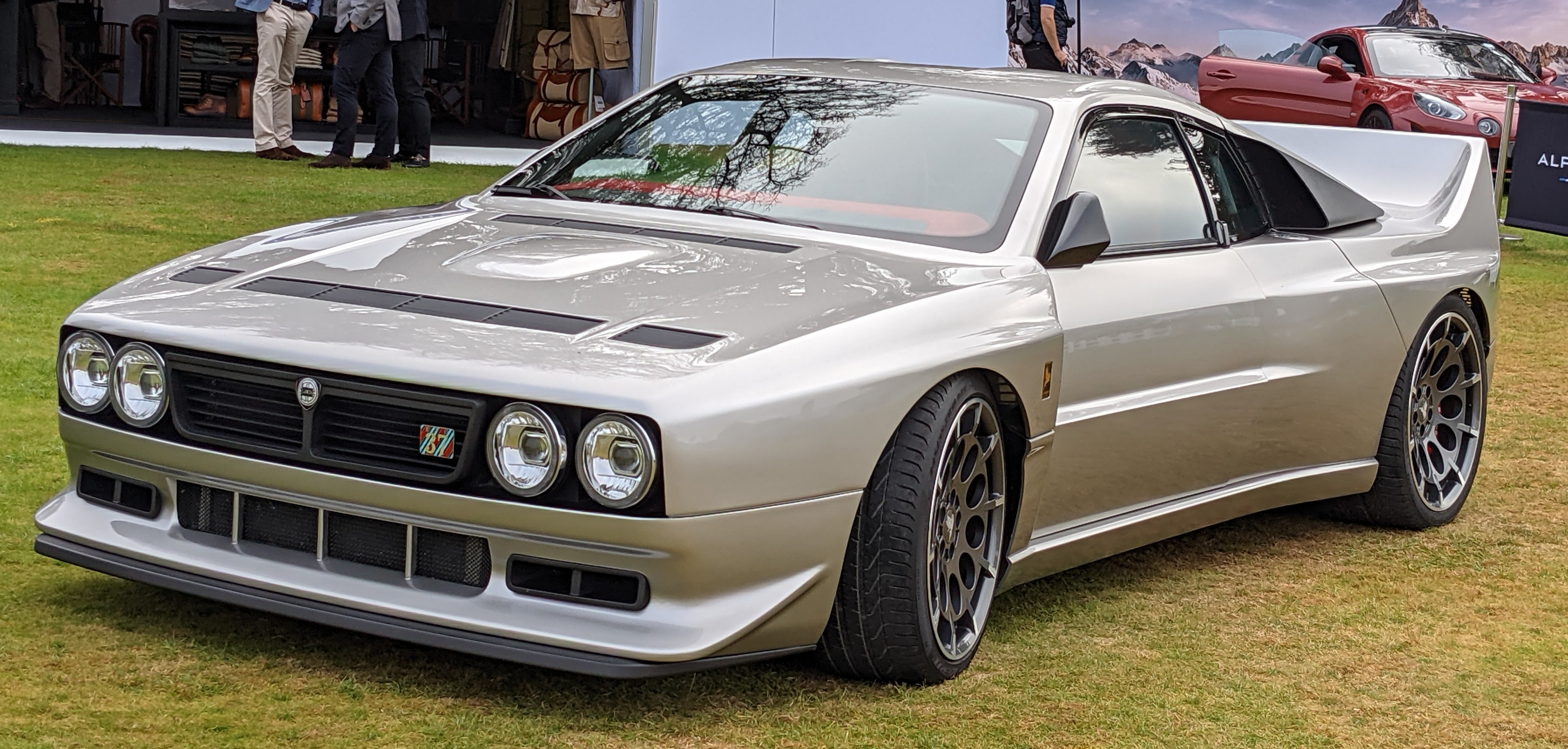
Kimera Evo 37

In early 2021, Italian automotive design firm Kimera Automobili unveiled their EVO37, a tribute to the Lancia Rally 037.
