= Fabrizio Tabaton =

Italian rally driver (born 1955)

Personal information
- Nationality: (Italy) Italian
- Born: May 16, 1955 (age 71)

World Rally Championship record
- Years active: 1978 – 1987, 1999
- Co-driver: (Italy) Andrea Cescon (Italy) Marco Genovesi (Italy) Emilio Radaelli (Italy) Luciano Tadeschini (Italy) Nicola Gullino
- Teams: Martini Racing, H.F. Grifone
- Rallies: 8
- Championships: 0
- Rally wins: 0
- Podiums: 0
- Stage wins: 5
- Total points: 18
- First rally: 1979 Rallye Sanremo
- Last rally: 1999 Monte Carlo Rally

Fabrizio Tabaton (born 16 May 1955) is an Italian former rally driver.

== Racing career ==
=== European Rally Championship ===
Competing for the H.F. Grifone team, he had his biggest successes in the European Rally Championship, which he won with a Lancia Delta S4 in 1986, and with a Lancia Delta Integrale and a Delta HF 4WD in 1988. He also finished runner-up twice; in 1985 to Dario Cerrato and in 1991 to Piero Liatti. In 1990, Tabaton placed third in the championship.

=== Italian Rally Championship ===
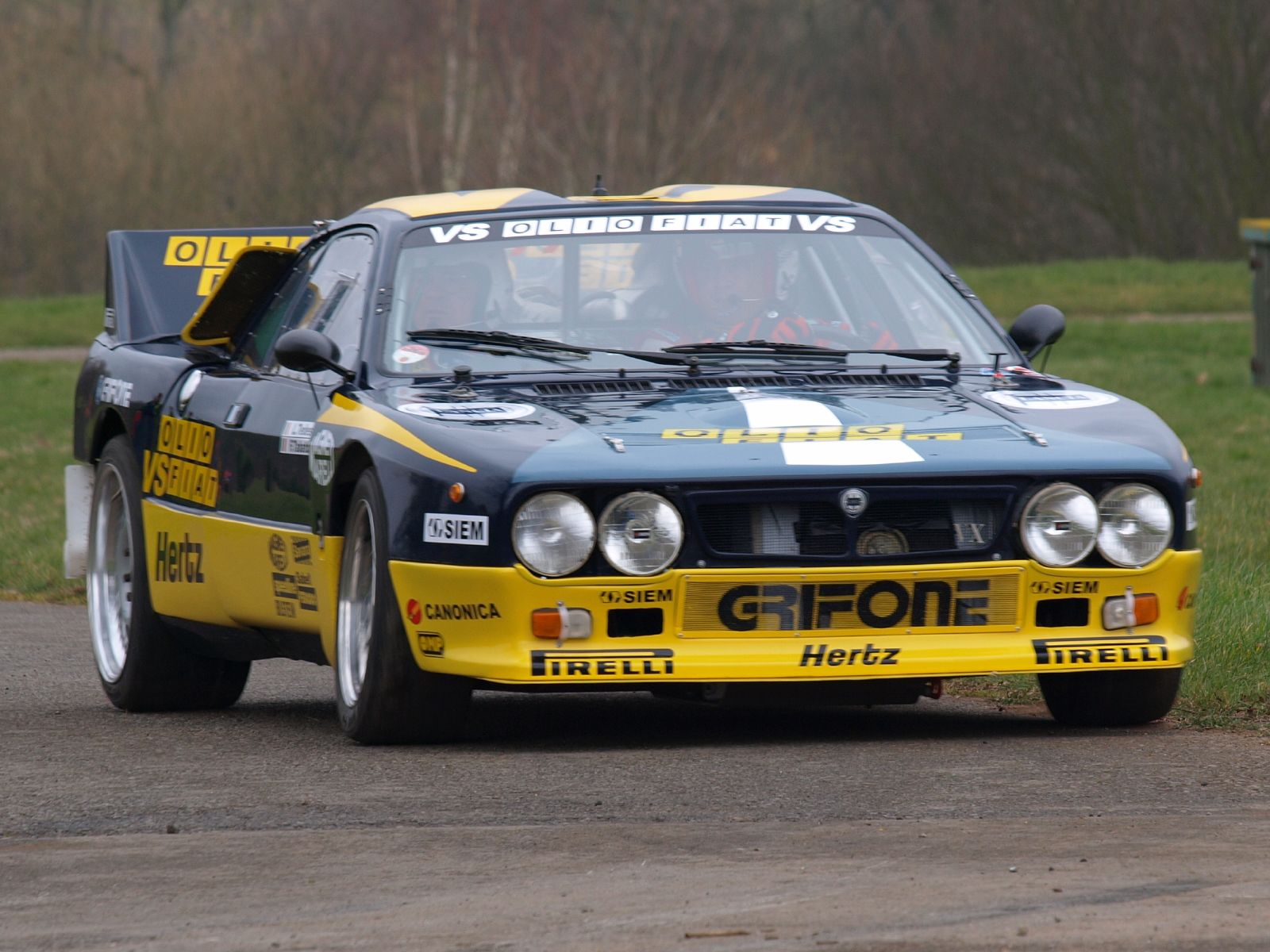
Tabaton's Lancia Rally 037 driven at the Race Retro 2008.

In the Italian Rally Championship, he captured the title in 1985 with a Lancia Rally 037 and in 1987 with a Delta HF 4WD.

=== World Rally Championship ===
In the World Rally Championship, Tabaton competed at his home event, the Rallye Sanremo, seven times. He retired in all but two occasions; driving for the Grifone team, he took fourth place in 1984 in a 037, and fifth place in 1987 in a Delta HF 4WD. He made a one-off return to the WRC in the 1999 season, competing with a Toyota Corolla WRC at the Monte Carlo Rally, but retired on the ninth stage.

== Post-racing career ==
After his racing career, Tabaton has worked as the head of the Grifone and Step2 organizations, which have continued their extensive programmes in European rallying. Grifone was also responsible for MotoGP star Valentino Rossi's WRC debut at the 2002 Wales Rally GB in a Peugeot 206 WRC.

Sporting positions
Preceded by Dario Cerrato	European Rally Champion; 1986	Succeeded by Dario Cerrato
Preceded by Dario Cerrato	European Rally Champion; 1988	Succeeded by Yves Loubet
