= Lancia ECV =

Prototype rally car

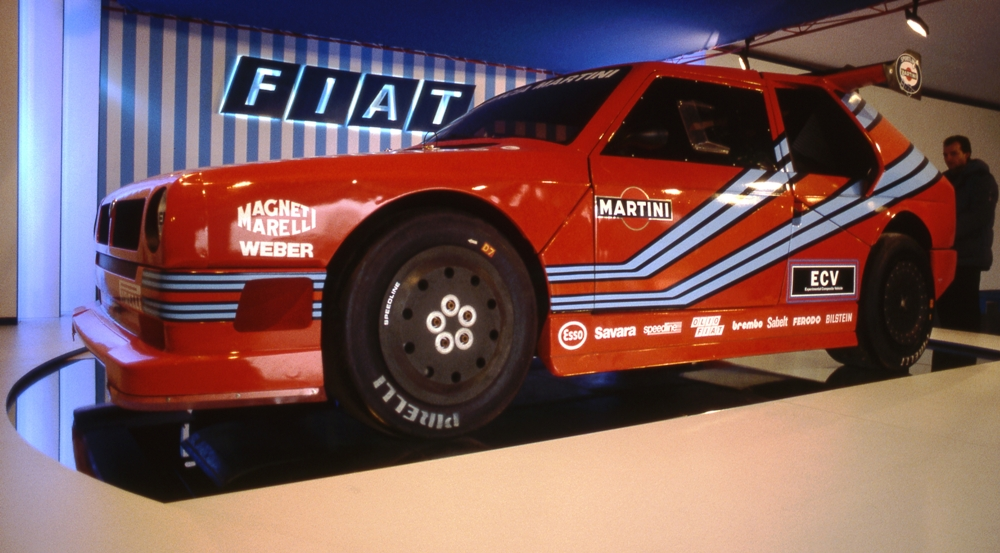
The Lancia ECV pictured during its first public presentation at Bologna in 1986

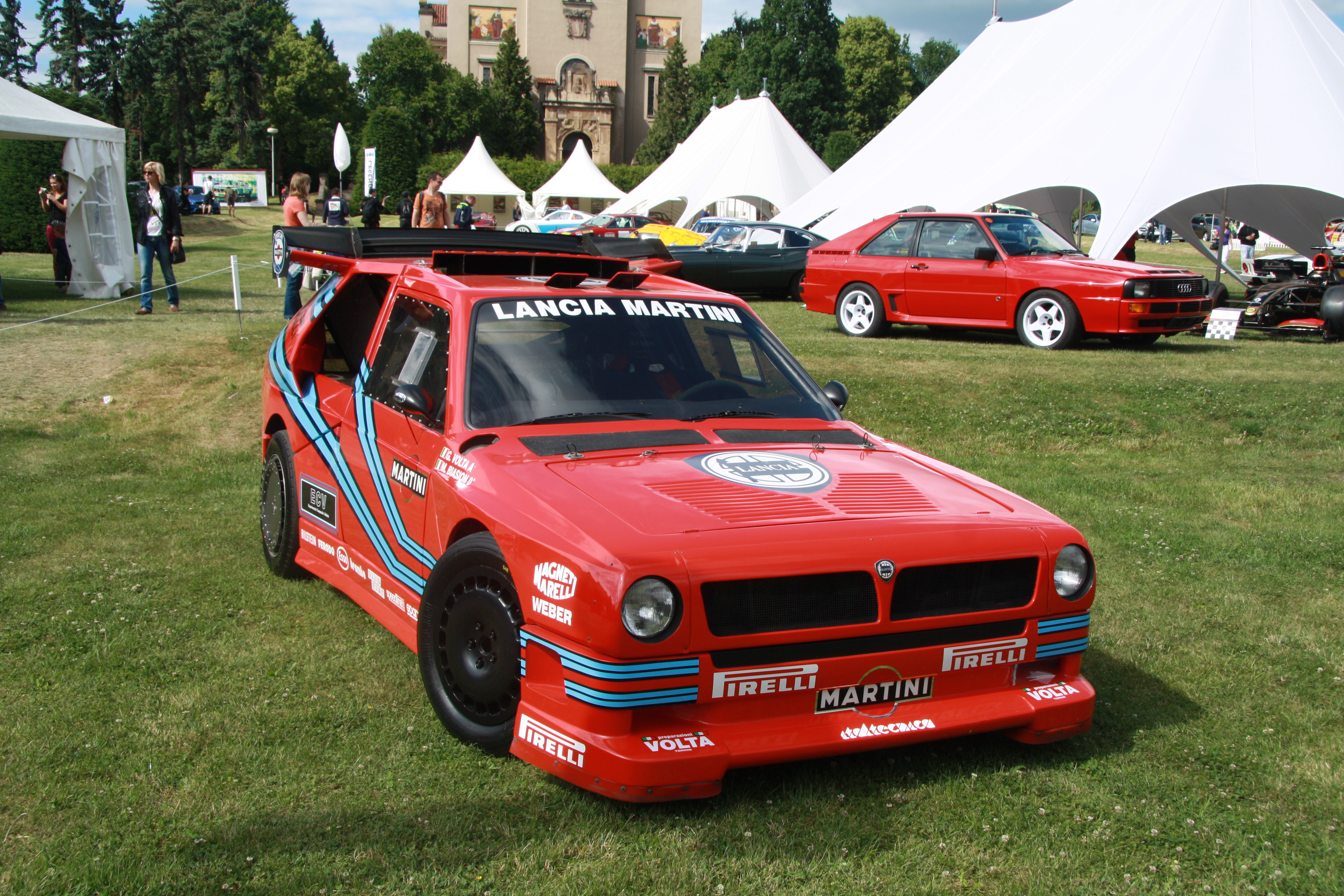
Lancia ECV at Legendy 2014 car show in Prague

The Lancia ECV (standing for Experimental Composite Vehicle) was a prototype Group S rally car developed by the Italian manufacturer Lancia to replace the Lancia Delta S4 in World Rally Championship competition for the 1988 season. However, Group B as well as Group S cars were banned from competition by the FIA in late 1986 concerns and the ECV never raced. Lancia instead developed the Group A Lancia Delta.

The car originally produced over 600 horsepower (448 kW) from a 1759 cc twin-turbocharged engine. This engine, christened TriFlux, was built in an unusual fashion; the valves were crossed (for each side of the cylinder there was an intake and an exhaust valve), so that the two turbochargers could be fed with two separate manifolds. A single manifold carried the intake air (hence the name, from the three separate air ducts). However, Group S rules would have artificially limited the car's output to 300 hp (224 kW) to limit speeds.

The car made extensive use of the composite materials Kevlar and carbon fibre to save weight and add strength. Overall the car weighed 930 kg (2,050 lb). The car also featured a new Martini colour-scheme, replacing the S4's white bodywork with red-based scheme. Lancia used the new scheme on its competition cars in 1987.

The restored ECV1, rebuilt from the original parts, was displayed at the Rally-Legend Event on 7-8-9 October 2010 in San-Marino, by the owner, Giuseppe Volta. An original TriFlux engine has been re-prepared, with the help of the original designer, Ing. Claudio Lombardi, and modern Turbo-engine preparation expert, Claudio Berri. A website has been opened to note the occasion.

== ECV 2 ==
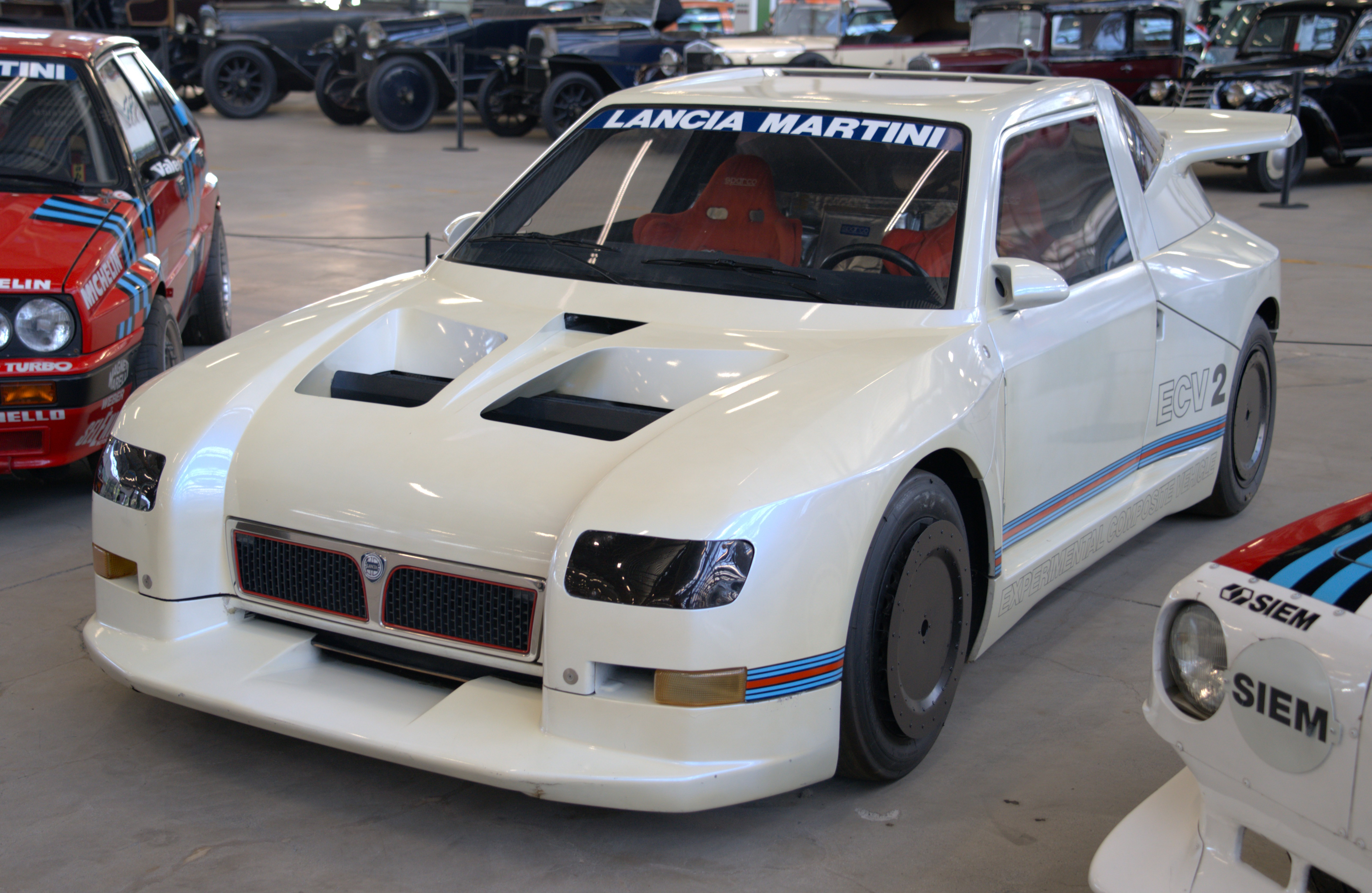
Lancia ECV 2

Despite the cancellation of Group S, Lancia improved the ECV with the 1988 ECV 2. The ECV 2 carbon-fibre chassis was that of the first ECV. The designer of the car was Carlo Gaino of his newly created design studio: Synthesis Design. The ECV 2 also made use of the TriFlux engine and featured improved aerodynamics.
