= Rali da Madeira =

Sport competition

- Status: Active
- Genre: Motorsporting event
- Date: July–August
- Frequency: Annual
- Location: Madeira Island
- Country: Portugal
- Inaugurated: 1959
- Website: Official website

The Rali da Madeira (formerly known as Rali Vinho da Madeira) is a tarmac rally held in Madeira Island, Portugal, and it is the biggest annual sporting event of the island, bringing thousands of people onto the roads to watch the drivers compete through the hilly terrain and the natural landscapes. Its first edition was in 1959, having later entered the European Rally Championship in 1979, and remaining in its calendar until 2012. It has also been part of the Intercontinental Rally Challenge since the championship was first held in 2006, which brought further exposure to the event as Eurosport broadcasts footage of this championship to many countries.

The rally is traditionally run in the summer, in early August or late July. The stages of Chão da Lagoa, Paul da Serra and the Encumeada downhill are known as its biggest driving challenges. Several drivers of international note such as Ari Vatanen, Henri Toivonen, Massimo Biasion and Andrea Aghini have won this rally before going on to win World Rally Championship rounds and championships.

Madeiran Alexandre Camacho is the driver with the most wins in the race, six in total from 2017 and 2023, followed by Aghini, winning four times between 1992 and 2002, Bruno Magalhães and Giandomenico Basso dispute the 3rd and 4th places respectively.

From 1959 until 2024 the event was named after Madeira wine, famously made on the island. However the rally was rebranded in 2025 as Rali da Madeira, removing any reference to wine or alcohol due to "the need to adapt to restrictions and bans on advertising alcoholic beverages in motorsport." Since 2019, the event has featured in the FIA European Rally Trophy calendar.

The Rally Madeira Legend is a classic rally held since 2019.

== Winners ==
Year	Driver	Car	International championship(s)
1959	(Portugal) José Lampreia	MGA	
1960	(Portugal) Horácio Macedo	Mercedes 300SL	
1961	(Portugal) António Peixinho	Alfa Romeo Giulietta	
1962	(Portugal) Horácio Macedo	Ferrari 250 GT SWB	
1963	(Portugal) Horácio Macedo	Ferrari 250 GT SWB	
1964	(Portugal) Fernando Basílio dos Santos	Porsche 911 SC	
1965	(Portugal) Zeca Cunha	Triumph TR4	
1966	(Portugal) António Sarmento Rebelo	NSU Prinz 1000	
1967	(France) Jean-Pierre Nicolas	Renault R8 Gordini 1300	
1968	(Portugal) Américo Nunes	Porsche 911 S	
1969	(Portugal) Américo Nunes	Porsche 911 S	
1970	(Portugal) Américo Nunes	Porsche 911 ST	
1971	(Portugal) Giovanni Salvi	Porsche 911 S	
1972	(Portugal) Luís Neto	Fiat 125 Special	
1973	(Portugal) Gomes Pereira	Opel 1904 SR	
1974	Not held		
1975	(Portugal) João Clemente Aguiar	Ford Escort RS1600	
1976	(Portugal) Giovanni Salvi	Ford Escort RS2000	
1977	(Portugal) Américo Nunes	Porsche 911 ST	
1978	(Finland) Ari Vatanen	Ford Escort RS2000	
1979	(Italy) Antonio Fassina	Lancia Stratos HF	European Rally Championship Coef. 1
1980	(Italy) Adartico Vudafieri	Fiat 131 Abarth	European Rally Championship Coef. 2
1981	(Luxembourg) Aloyse Kridel	Ford Escort RS1800	European Rally Championship Coef. 3
1982	(Italy) Antonio Fassina	Opel Ascona 400	European Rally Championship Coef. 3
1983	(Italy) Massimo Biasion	Lancia 037	European Rally Championship Coef. 4
1984	(Finland) Henri Toivonen	Porsche 911 SC	European Rally Championship Coef. 4
1985	(Spain) Salvador Servià	Lancia 037	European Rally Championship Coef. 4
1986	(Italy) Fabrizio Tabaton	Lancia Delta S4	European Rally Championship Coef. 4
1987	(Italy) Massimo Biasion	Lancia Delta HF 4WD	European Rally Championship Coef. 4
1988	(Belgium) Patrick Snijers	BMW M3	European Rally Championship Coef. 20
1989	(France) Yves Loubet	Lancia Delta Integrale	European Rally Championship Coef. 20
1990	(Italy) Fabrizio Tabaton	Lancia Delta Integrale	European Rally Championship Coef. 20
1991	(Italy) Fabrizio Tabaton	Lancia Delta Integrale 16V	European Rally Championship Coef. 20
1992	(Italy) Andrea Aghini	Lancia Delta HF Integrale	European Rally Championship Coef. 20
1993	(Belgium) Patrick Snijers	Ford Escort RS Cosworth	European Rally Championship Coef. 20
1994	(Italy) Andrea Aghini	Toyota Celica GT-Four	European Rally Championship Coef. 20
1995	(Italy) Piero Liatti	Subaru Impreza WRX	European Rally Championship Coef. 20
1996	(Portugal) Fernando Peres	Ford Escort RS Cosworth	European Rally Championship Coef. 20
1997	(Italy) Piero Liatti	Subaru Impreza WRC	European Rally Championship Coef. 20
1998	(Italy) Andrea Aghini	Toyota Corolla WRC	European Rally Championship Coef. 20
1999	(Belgium) Bruno Thiry	Subaru Impreza WRC	European Rally Championship Coef. 20
2000	(Italy) Piero Liatti	Subaru Impreza WRC	European Rally Championship Coef. 20
2001	(Portugal) Adruzilo Lopes	Peugeot 206 WRC	European Rally Championship Coef. 20
2002	(Italy) Andrea Aghini	Peugeot 206 WRC	European Rally Championship Coef. 20
2003	(Portugal) Miguel Campos	Peugeot 206 WRC	European Rally Championship Coef. 20
2004	(Portugal) Vítor Sá	Peugeot 306 Maxi	European Rally Championship
2005	(Italy) Renato Travaglia	Renault Clio S1600	European Rally Championship
2006	(Italy) Giandomenico Basso	Fiat Punto Abarth S2000	European Rally Championship; Intercontinental Rally Challenge
2007	(Italy) Giandomenico Basso	Fiat Punto Abarth S2000	European Rally Championship; Intercontinental Rally Challenge
2008	(France) Nicolas Vouilloz	Peugeot 207 S2000	European Rally Championship; Intercontinental Rally Challenge
2009	(Italy) Giandomenico Basso	Fiat Punto Abarth S2000	European Rally Championship; Intercontinental Rally Challenge
2010	(Belgium) Freddy Loix	Škoda Fabia S2000	European Rally Championship; Intercontinental Rally Challenge
2011	(Portugal) Bruno Magalhães	Peugeot 207 S2000	European Rally Championship
2012	(Portugal) Bruno Magalhães	Peugeot 207 S2000	European Rally Championship
2013	(Italy) Giandomenico Basso	Peugeot 207 S2000	ERC Cup Coef. 20
2014	(Portugal) Bruno Magalhães	Peugeot 208 T16	FIA European Rally Trophy Coef. 20
2015	(Portugal) Bruno Magalhães	Peugeot 208 T16	FIA European Rally Trophy Coef. 20
2016	(Portugal) José Pedro Fontes	Citroën DS3 R5	Tour European Rally
2017	(Portugal) Alexandre Camacho	Peugeot 208 T16 R5	Tour European Rally
2018	(Portugal) Alexandre Camacho	Škoda Fabia R5	Tour European Rally
2019	(Portugal) Alexandre Camacho	Škoda Fabia R5	FIA European Rally Trophy
2020	(Portugal) Miguel Nunes	Škoda Fabia Rally2 evo	FIA European Rally Trophy
2021	(Portugal) Alexandre Camacho	Škoda Fabia Rally2 evo	FIA European Rally Trophy
2022	(Portugal) Alexandre Camacho	Škoda Fabia Rally2 evo	FIA European Rally Trophy
2023	(Portugal) Alexandre Camacho	Škoda Fabia Rally2 evo	FIA European Rally Trophy
2024	(Spain) Diego Ruiloba	Citroën C3 Rally2	FIA European Rally Trophy
2025	(Spain) Diego Ruiloba	Citroën C3 Rally2	FIA European Rally Trophy
