= Rally Bulgaria =

Rally competition in Bulgaria

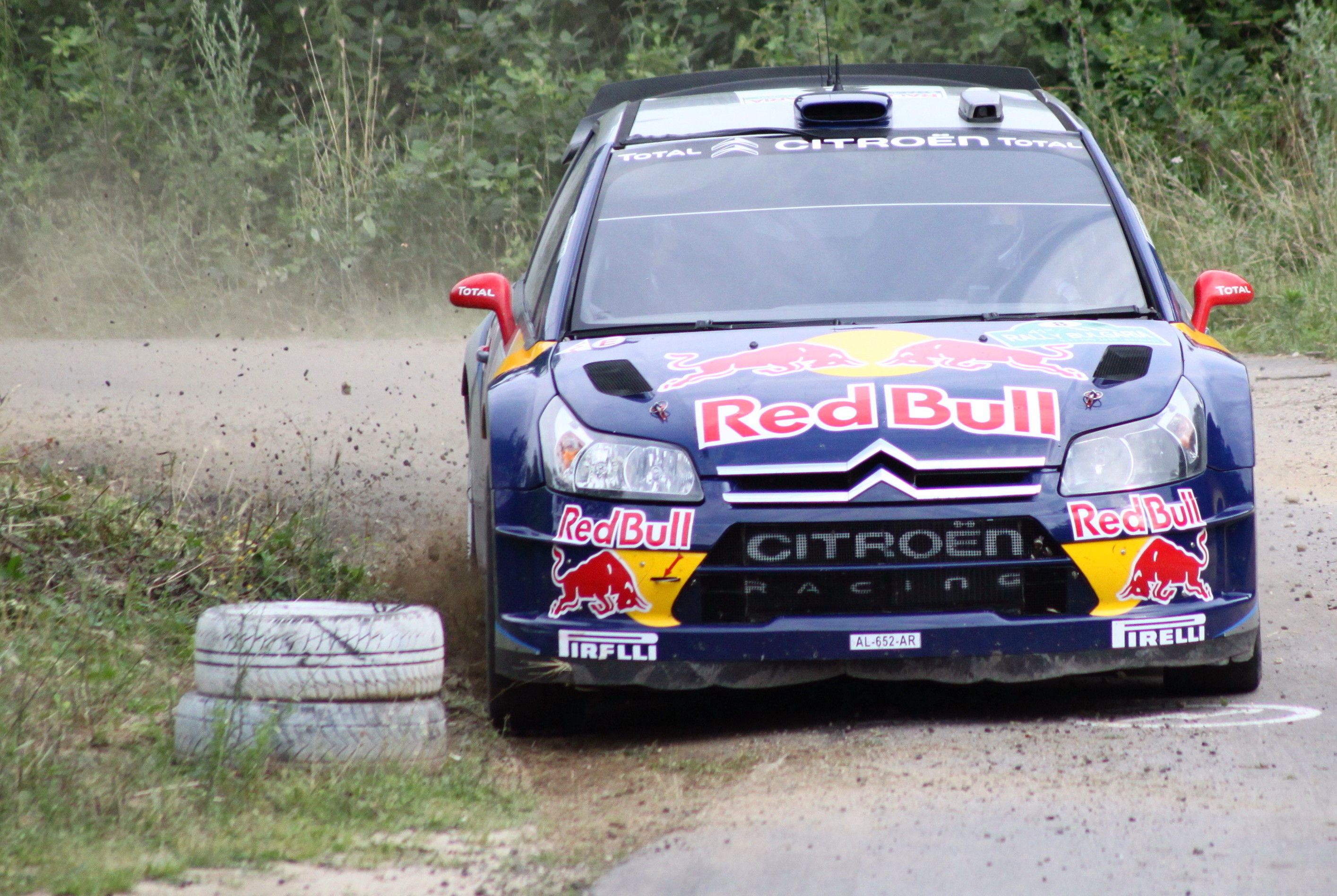
Kimi Räikkönen in SS7 Lyubnitsa – 41st Rally Bulgaria 2010

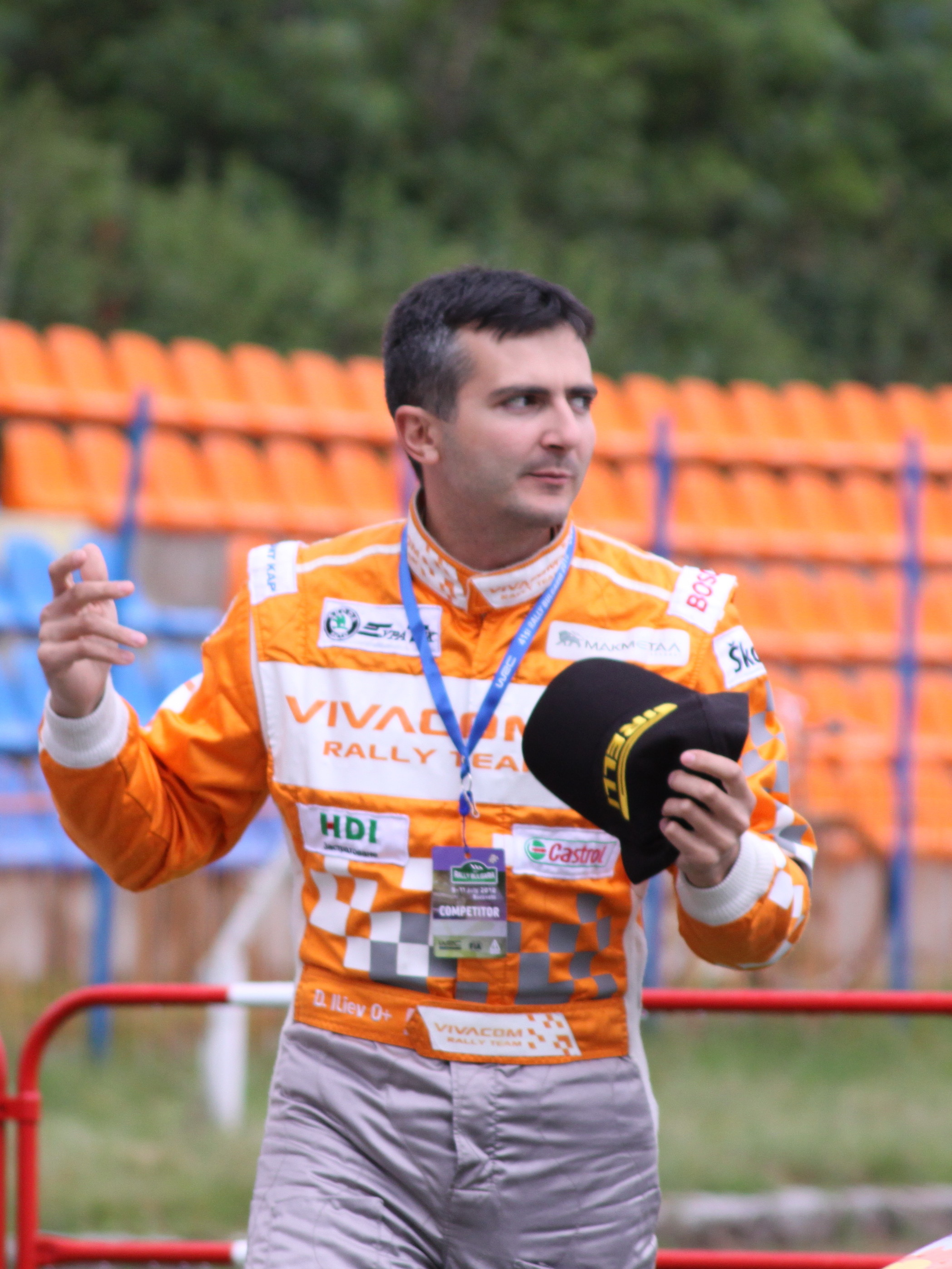
Dimitar Iliev is the second Bulgarian pilot to win the rally (in 2007) after Ilia Chubrikov. Iliev won for the second time in 2012 as well.

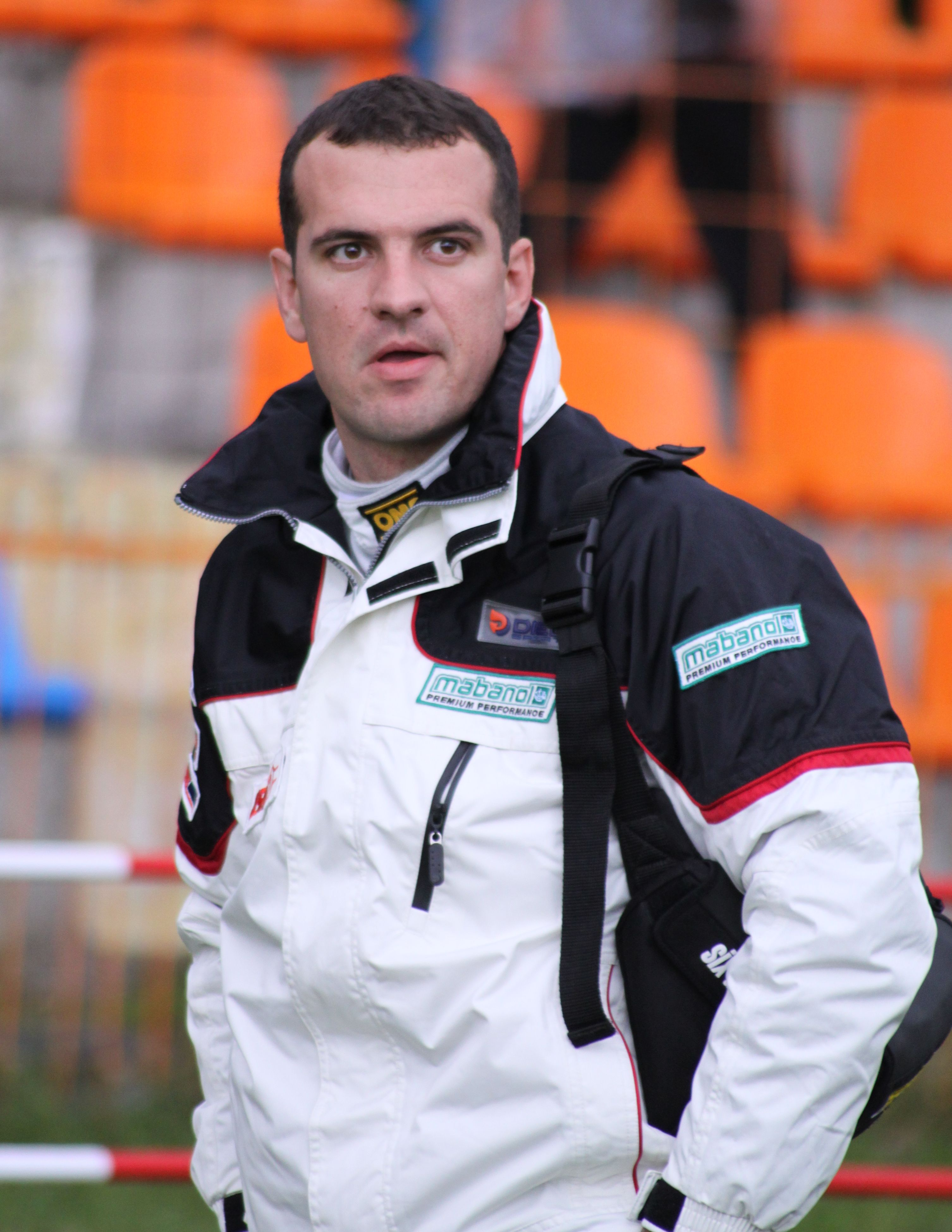
Krum Donchev won for the first time in 2008. He, together with Iliev, also has won the event twice, the second time in 2014.

Rally Bulgaria (Bulgarian: Рали България) is the most prestigious and also the oldest rally event in Republic of Bulgaria. It was confirmed for the 2010 World Rally Championship season as the seventh of all thirteen planned events. Year 2010 was also the first and so far the only one that Rally Bulgaria has been in the World Rally Championship, having previously hosted races for the European Rally Championship instead. The application of the country was accepted by the FIA despite the fact that Rally Bulgaria's candidate event in July 2009 ended in an accident which killed Italian co-driver Flavio Guglielmini and seriously injured Swiss driver Brian Lavio. Bulgaria was the only new candidate for the 2010 World Rally Championship season, although Rally Argentina had made a reserve application just in case Bulgarian rally failed.

The latest HQ of the rally is the town of Samokov (2013–2015) and the route of the event contains special stages in Bulgaria's Sofia Province and Pazardzhik Province. The route, including some of the special stages, passes through the famous Borovets ski resort which was HQ from 2002 to 2012, meaning that it has also hosted the 2010 World Rally Championship season event.

== A brief history of the Bulgarian Motorsport ==
Through the years Bulgarians have always been interested in the motorsport in one way or another. For the first Bulgarian Motorsport event is considered the 1914 race held around the capital Sofia and the winner there was Bulgarian Dimitar Pehlivanov. Many years of various motorsport events followed after this first try and every time the races grew bigger and more complicated than the previous ones.

Initially only Bulgarian, year by year, the events acquired international status because of the participation of pilots firstly from the Balkan Peninsula countries (Romania, former Yugoslavia, Greece and Turkey), then from the former Soviet Union countries (like Poland, Hungary, Czechoslovakia, East Germany, etc.), and later – from most of the West European countries (West Germany, Belgium, Netherlands, France, Italy, Spain, etc.).

The first years of the Bulgarian Motorsport have been the years when the car, as a necessity, was not a normal thing as it is today. In this initial period (from the end of the 19th Century until the mid 20th Century) the motorsport in Bulgaria was a privilege only for limited number of people – dealers, owners of factories or service-stations, and some enthusiasts (mechanics, chauffeurs, etc.).

The second period of nation's motorsport development had begun in the mid-1950s, when the automobiles in Bulgaria were already comparatively widespread. The newest history of the Bulgarian Motorsport dates back to 1958 when the Bulgarian Automobile Tourist Club (BATC) was established. A year later, in 1959, the first true rally event has been organised. Its start was in the capital Sofia and the itinerary covered 275 km in the West and North-West of the country.

In the next 1960 it has been decided that the Bulgarian Rally Championship for that year would be proceeded as a "Circuit of Bulgaria". The first motorsport activity, which shows the interest of the Bulgarian women in the sport – the inaugural ladies' rally "8th of March" – was held in 1961. The first Kart Race has been organised two years later – in 1963, while in the following 1964 the Renault Factory in Plovdiv (the second biggest town in Bulgaria) opened its doors having great positive influence in the Bulgarian Motorsport later on.

One by one, different rally events appeared some years later and several of them became traditional rounds of the Bulgarian Rally Championship:

- Rally Stari Stolici – established in 1970; existing nowadays; translated: Rally Old Capitals; counts for the Bulgarian Rally Championship; HQ is town of Shumen;
- Rally Hebros – established in 1972; not organised in 2014 for the first time in its history; in the recent few years it counted for the Bulgarian Rally Championship only, but in the past it was also part of the European Rally Championship with coefficients 5 and 10, and later on the event counted for the then European Rally Cup (now European Rally Trophy) with coefficient 5; HQ is town of Plovdiv;
- Rally Sliven – established in 1976; existing nowadays; counts for the European Rally Trophy with coefficient 3 and for the Bulgarian Rally Championship; HQ is town of Sliven;
- Rally Tvarditsa(-Elena) – established in 2005; existing nowadays; counts for the Bulgarian Rally Championship; HQ is town of Tvarditsa;
- Rally Sredna Gora – established in 2004; existing nowadays despite some problems with the organisation lately; name in the period 2004–2011: Rally Trayanovi Vrata; counts for the European Rally Trophy with coefficient 2 and for the Bulgarian Rally Championship; HQ is town of Panagyurishte (HQ in the period 2004–2011 – town of Kostenets);
- Rally Vida – established in 1971 and held up until 1989, reborn in 2007 as part of the Bulgarian Rally Championship, but nowadays counts for the Bulgarian Rally Sprint Championship instead; HQ is town of Vidin;
- Rally Boruy – not existing nowadays; HQ was town of Stara Zagora;
- Rally Osogovo – existing nowadays as hillclimb race; HQ was town of Kyustendil;

But preceding all of the above-mentioned rallies, in the summer of 1970, the first International Rally Zlatni Piassatsi (translated: Rally Golden Sands) has been organised in the famous Bulgarian summer resort of the same name, as 36 crews from Bulgaria, Poland, former Yugoslavia and East Germany took the start. In the following years the rally has changed its name several times (Rally Zlatni, Rally Albena, etc.), while in 2002 it has also generally changed its location as well – from the glamorous and sunny Bulgarian coastline to the heart of the gorgeous Rila Mountain – some 500 km to the West – in the Borovets ski resort. Since then (despite in 2013 the HQ moved another 10 km to the North-West in town of Samokov) the rally is known as Rally Bulgaria.

== From Rally Zlatni Piassatsi 1970 to Rally Bulgaria 2015 ==
Rally Bulgaria is the oldest and most prestigious motorsport event in Republic of Bulgaria. There are evidences that the first unofficial edition of the rally was in 1965, but the first ever official Rally Zlatni Piassatsi (translated: Rally Golden Sands) has started on 12 June 1970 in front of Hotel International which is located in the sea resort of the same name – Zlatni Piassatsi (Golden Sands resort). Just year and a half later the rally commission of the then Fédération Internationale du Sport Automobile (FISA) confirmed it as a part of the European Rally Championship. The rally was the first event to run a closed (circuit like) special stage – a characteristic feature of the rally included in its first official running back in 1970.

In 1975 the rally was awarded with coefficient 3 (the highest then was coefficient 4). Another three years later and on 10 October 1978 the rally commission of FISA awarded it with the 4 "stars" of difficulty after the fact that the Bulgarian rally has gathered a total of 123.5 points. On the same date the event was also included in the 10 super European rallies, which determined the European Rally Championship of that time. After all the positives, in 1979, FISA took back one of the fours stars, because of "weaknesses in the organisation", as the observers have written on the past rally report.

In 1984 the HQ of the rally moved from Zlatni Piassatsi sea resort to its neighbor resort Albena (both held near third biggest town in Bulgaria – Varna). Four years later FISA awarded the Bulgarian rally again with the highest coefficient of difficulty, which by this time was already 20. Since then, until 2003 including, the rally was fixed in the highest group of rallies with coefficient 20, which made up the calendar of the European Rally Championship. From 2004 to 2009 including the rally continued to be part of this highest group of rallies, but FIA decided to remove the coefficients and the championship was named just European Rally Championship, while the coefficients were left only for the then European Rally Cup (now European Rally Trophy). In both 2008 and 2009 Rally Bulgaria was also a World Rally Championship Candidate Event.

As a matter of fact, in all runnings of the event until 2002, less than 1/5 of the itinerary was based around the HQ resorts. The most of it was rather located in the Balkan Mountains around towns of Sliven and Shoumen with their emblematic stages like "Stara Reka" (translated: "Old River"), "Bulgarka", "Tvarditsa-Elena", "Varbitsa", and many others...

Corrado Fontana and his co-driver Renzo Casazza during Rally Bulgaria 2008 on SS "Sestrimo" at 2000 m above sea level along Belmeken Dam.

The big change had to happen after the observers of the Fédération Internationale de l'Automobile (FIA – the new name of the international motorsport federation) recommended to avoid the long road sections which connected the seaside with the mountain stages – between 150 and 250 km in one direction.

So, from 2002 on the rally changed its name one more time and from Rally Albena (the last name from 2001) it became Rally Bulgaria. This also came with the change of the location of the event as well – after 32 years on the seaside, the new HQ was based about 500 km to the West – in the ski resort Borovets, which is located in the Rila Mountain. The route of the rally, of course, was completely new which caused many discussions among the participants and keen rally fans whether the change was good or not. Despite that, over the years, the rally "created" its new famous places like the so-called "Turkish Parking" and the road along the picturesque Belmeken Dam.

Year 2010 marked the pinnacle of the Bulgarian rally sport – Rally Bulgaria became part of the World Rally Championship calendar for the very first time. It was long-awaited achievement and at the end all people involved were satisfied that it has finally happened.

For 2011 and 2012 the rally went back to the European Rally Championship, while in 2013 it counted only for the then European Rally Cup with coefficient 20 which name was changed to European Rally Trophy for 2014. The coefficient was also changed – from 20 it became 4 (as in the old times), but it was equal, of course, to 2013's already former coefficient 20. In 2015 Rally Bulgaria will count one more time for the European Rally Trophy with the highest coefficient – 4.

A bit earlier, in 2013, Rally Bulgaria changed its HQ one more time, but on that occasion it was just 10 km to the North-West of Borovets – in town of Samokov. The HQ was there also in 2014 and will remain there for the 46th edition of the event this year – 2015.

=== Validity of the rally ===
Year(s)	Valid for
1970–1971	Bulgarian Rally Championship
1972–1974	Bulgarian Rally Championship European Rally Championship for drivers Soviet Union Rally Championship
1975–1976	Bulgarian Rally Championship European Rally Championship for drivers (coefficient 3) Soviet Union Rally Championship – Cup "Peace & Friendship"
1977–1981 & 1982–1983	Bulgarian Rally Championship European Rally Championship for drivers (with coefficient 3 in 1977–1978 and 1980–1981, with coefficient 4 in 1979 alone and from 1982 on) Soviet Union Rally Championship – Cup "Peace & Friendship" Romanian Rally Championship Turkish Rally Championship Greek Rally Championship
1984–1986	Bulgarian Rally Championship European Rally Championship for drivers (coefficient 4) European Rally Championship for Group A drivers Soviet Union Rally Championship – Cup "Peace & Friendship" Romanian Rally Championship Turkish Rally Championship Greek Rally Championship
1987	Bulgarian Rally Championship European Rally Championship for drivers (coefficient 4) Soviet Union Rally Championship – Cup "Peace & Friendship"
1988–1989	Bulgarian Rally Championship European Rally Championship for drivers (coefficient 20) European Rally Championship for Group N drivers Soviet Union Rally Championship – Cup "Peace & Friendship"
1990	Bulgarian Rally Championship European Rally Championship for drivers (coefficient 20) European Rally Championship for Group N drivers Soviet Union Rally Championship – Cup "Peace & Friendship" Belgium Rally Championship
1991–1992	Bulgarian Rally Championship European Rally Championship for drivers (coefficient 20) European Rally Championship for Group N drivers
1993–1995	Bulgarian Rally Championship European Rally Championship for drivers (coefficient 20) European Rally Championship for Group N drivers FIA European Rally Cup for drivers
1996–1997	Bulgarian Rally Championship European Rally Championship for drivers & makes (coefficient 20) European Rally Championship for Group N drivers FIA European Rally Cup for drivers Balkan Rally Championship for drivers
1998–1999	Bulgarian Rally Championship European Rally Championship for drivers & makes (coefficient 20) FIA European Rally Cup for drivers Balkan Rally Championship for drivers
2000	Bulgarian Rally Championship European Rally Championship for drivers & makes (coefficient 20) FIA European Rally Cup for drivers Balkan Rally Championship for drivers
2001	Bulgarian Rally Championship European Rally Championship for drivers & makes (coefficient 20)
2002	Bulgarian Rally Championship European Rally Championship for drivers (coefficient 20) European Rally Championship for Super 1600 drivers
2003–2007	Bulgarian Rally Championship European Rally Championship for drivers
2008	Bulgarian Rally Championship European Rally Championship for drivers World Rally Championship Candidate Event
2009	Bulgarian Rally Championship European Rally Championship for drivers 2WD European Rally Cup Pirelli Star Driver – Qualification World Rally Championship Candidate Event
2010	World Rally Championship Junior World Rally Championship
2011–2012	Bulgarian Rally Championship European Rally Championship for drivers
2013	Bulgarian Rally Championship European Rally Cup for drivers (coefficient 20)
2014–2015	Bulgarian Rally Championship European Rally Trophy for drivers (coefficient 4)

== Recent events ==
=== Rally Bulgaria 2002, 24–26 May ===
The 33rd edition of the rally was an all new event, because of the change of HQ's location – more than 500 km West from Zlatni Piassatsi and Albena sea resorts in the heart of Rila Mountain, where the new HQ Borovets ski resort is situated. The change was a necessity for the event in order to save its coefficient 20 for the European Rally Championship.

The rally was much more compact than the previous one, despite some of the new stages were not so technical like the classics of the previous event. Nevertheless, the new stages were also very good and the bigger part of them offered almost a completely new challenge to the competitors.

Rally Bulgaria 2002 was the only event in the whole history of the rally, which consisted of three full competitive Legs, despite the first of them was comparatively short one (just less than 60 km of special stages).

Rally route led the competitors to stages, which have never been used before in another rally (Leg 1 & Leg 2), but also to stages, which are very famous from another event of the Bulgarian Rally Championship – Rally Hebros (Leg 3).

List of stages: Leg 1

Number	Name	Length (km)
SS1	Borovets 1	8.66
SS2	Tunela	9.41
SS3	Dolno Varshilo	7.80
SS4	Topolnitsa	7.78
SS5	Eledzhik	17.91
SS6	Raduil 1	8.16

Leg 2

Number	Name	Length (km)
SS7	Borovets 2	8.66
SS8	Mаtivir 1	17.82
SS9	Yazovira 1	7.28
SS10	Gorno Varshilo 1	7.88
SS11	Trayanovi Vrata 1	8.97
SS12	Tsarska Bistritsa 1	6.82
SS13	Mаtivir 2	17.82
SS14	Yazovira 2	7.28
SS15	Gorno Varshilo 2	7.88
SS16	Trayanovi Vrata 2	8.97
SS17	Raduil 2	8.88
SS18	Tsarska Bistritsa 2	6.82

Leg 3

Number	Name	Length (km)
SS19	Sveti Konstantin 1	31.96
SS20	Rekata 1	12.11
SS21	Dobra Voda 1	31.66
SS22	Rekata 2	12.11
SS23	Sveti Konstantin 2	31.96
SS24	Dobra Voda 2	8.83

=== Rally Bulgaria 2003, 13–15 June ===
The second running over the new route was in 2003. Despite this, the 34th edition of Rally Bulgaria was very different from the 33rd. In fact, every rally since 2003, except 2006 and 2009, is more or less the same with this 34th edition of the event. As a beginning, the rally was in two competitive Legs again.

For the first time in 2003 it was introduced a short special stage on the streets of the HQ resort Borovets, which carried the same name. The other new stages were "Sestrimo" and "Yundola", and also their reverse variants, which were with different length, called "Belmeken" and "Belovo" respectively. Interesting fact is that "Sestrimo" stage climbs up to 2000m above the sea level and the turbo cars are struggling on the highest points of the stage, because of the rarefied air.

Some of the stages from 2002 like "Borovets" stage of that time (it wasn't so much on the streets of the resort and was more like ordinary longer stage), "Raduil", which was the reversed variant of "Borovets", and also "Tsarska Bistritsa" were completely removed from the itinerary for 2003 and have never been used since then. In fact, a part of "Tsarska Bistritsa" stage has been used as a shakedown for the next four years.

All of the stages from Leg 3 of Rally Bulgaria 2002 were completely removed from the itinerary too and have also never been used in the event since then (but in 2010 the bigger part of the will be back in the rally).

The short stages from 2002, like the pair "Tunela" and "Dolno Varshilo", and the next pair "Topolnitsa" and "Eledzhik" were saved in the rally (and have been used ever since), but the change there was the following: both stages from the pairs were connected to each other and lengthened as well. The stage, which emerged from the first pair, was "Magistrala", while the other stage was "Tserovo". The same happened with their reverse variants – the pair "Gorno Varshilo" and "Trayanovi Vrata" became "Slavovitsa", while the last pair "Mativir" and "Yazovira" was named "Muhovo".

List of stages: Leg 1

Number	Name	Length (km)
SS1	Borovets	3.04
SS2	Muhovo	29.20
SS3	Slavovitsa	18.50
SS4	Sestrimo 1	31.95
SS5	Yundola 1	18.70
SS6	Sestrimo 2	31.95
SS7	Yundola 2	18.70

Leg 2

Number	Name	Length (km)
SS8	Magistrala 1	18.30
SS9	Tserovo 1	29.30
SS10	Magistrala 2	18.30
SS11	Tserovo 2	29.30
SS12	Belovo	18.60
SS13	Belmeken	23.67

=== Rally Bulgaria 2004, 18–19 June ===
With about 38% of special stages, the route from 2003 was perfect. So, the organizers of the rally decided that the 35th Rally Bulgaria 2004 will be running over the same itinerary, which has been chosen in 2003.

The only different stuff in 2004 was the little change of the length of the special stages (just with some meters ar as much as a kilometer), but all this was insignificant.

For a Shakedown of the rally was chosen a 4-kilometer part of the former "Tsarska Bistritsa" stage, which in 2002 was included in Leg 2 of the rally as SS12/SS18.

List of stages:

Leg 1

Number	Name	Length (km)
SS1	Borovets	2.95
SS2	Muhovo	28.89
SS3	Slavovitsa	18.24
SS4	Sestrimo 1	31.98
SS5	Yundola 1	18.57
SS6	Sestrimo 2	31.98
SS7	Yundola 2	18.57

Leg 2

Number	Name	Length (km)
SS8	Magistrala 1	18.24
SS9	Tserovo 1	29.08
SS10	Magistrala 2	18.24
SS11	Tserovo 2	29.08
SS12	Belovo	18.44
SS13	Belmeken	22.27

=== Rally Bulgaria 2005, 8–10 July ===
36th Rally Bulgaria 2005 was the same as the previous two events from 2003 and 2004. This time the difference between the closest rally (this one from 2004) in terms of stages was only one – "Sestrimo" stage was shortened by a bit less than 2 kilometers. The shakedown was also the same.

List of stages: Leg 1

Number	Name	Length (km)
SS1	Borovets	2.95
SS2	Muhovo	28.89
SS3	Slavovitsa	18.24
SS4	Sestrimo 1	30.11
SS5	Yundola 1	18.57
SS6	Sestrimo 2	30.11
SS7	Yundola 2	18.57

Leg 2

Number	Name	Length (km)
SS8	Magistrala 1	18.24
SS9	Tserovo 1	29.08
SS10	Magistrala 2	18.24
SS11	Tserovo 2	29.08
SS12	Belovo	18.44
SS13	Belmeken	22.27

=== Rally Bulgaria 2006, 7–9 July ===
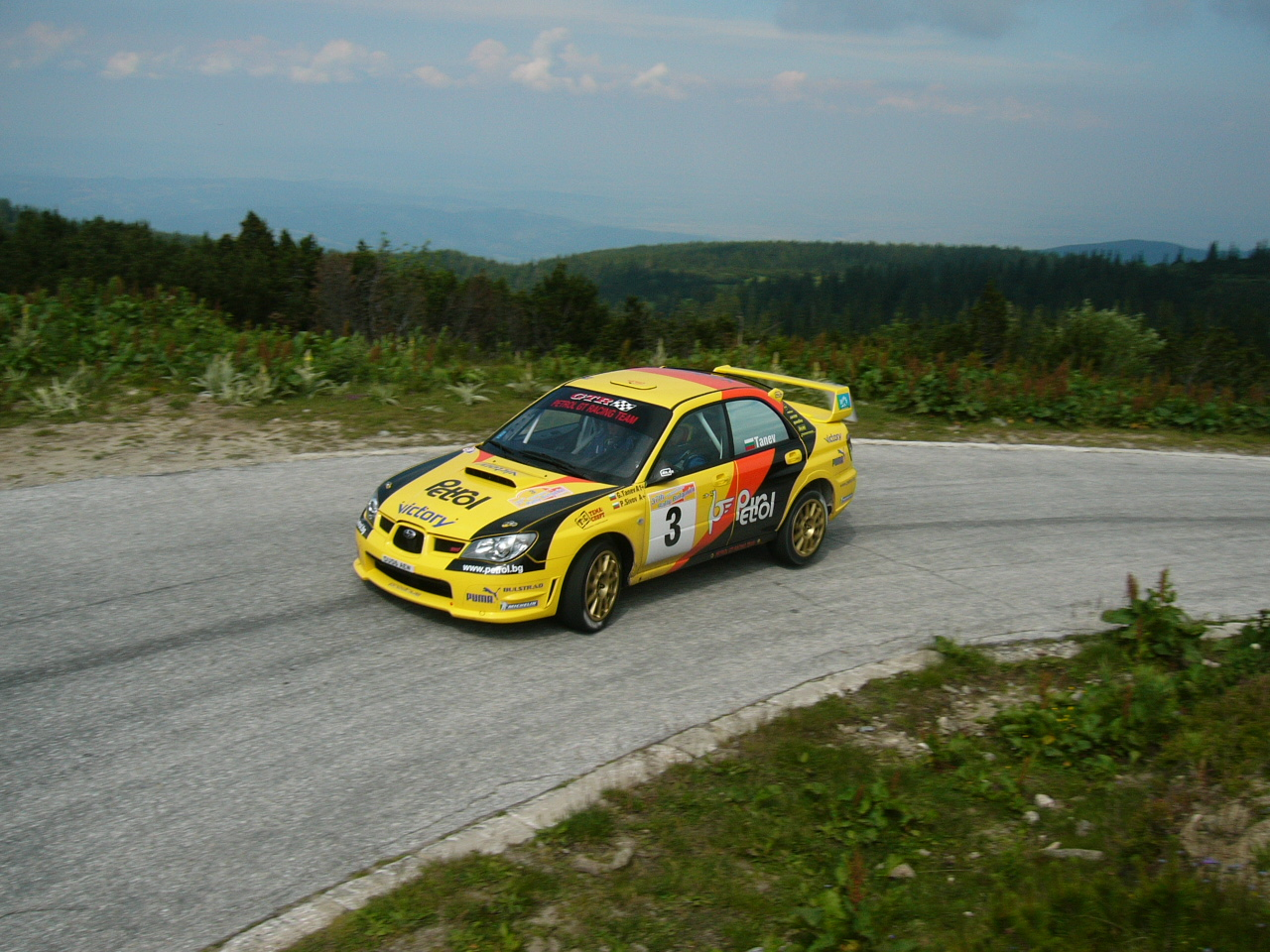
Young Georgy Tanev with his experienced co-driver Petar Sivov on 30.11-kilometer SS6 Sestrimo 2

This edition of Rally Bulgaria was the first after 2003, where there was more significant change. This change was the introducing of a brand-new stage, which has never been used before – it was "Veligrad" (12.70 km) stage and its reverse variant, named "Varvara" (also 12.70 km).

But this stage came more as rescuing attempt for rally's itinerary than anything else. The organizers were forced to put this stage on the place of another one – "Yundola" and its reversed variant "Belovo", which was closed by the authorities for repairs.

The 30.11-kilometer variant of "Sestrimo" stage went down well in the last edition of the rally and organizers decided to save it as it was used in 2005. The Shakedown was also the same as the last few editions of the rally.

List of stages: Leg 1

Number	Name	Length (km)
SS1	Borovets	2.95
SS2	Muhovo	28.89
SS3	Slavovitsa	18.24
SS4	Sestrimo 1	30.11
SS5	Velingrad 1	12.70
SS6	Sestrimo 2	30.11
SS7	Velingrad 2	12.70

Leg 2

Number	Name	Length (km)
SS8	Magistrala 1	18.24
SS9	Tserovo 1	29.08
SS10	Magistrala 2	18.24
SS11	Tserovo 2	29.08
SS12	Varvara	12.70
SS13	Belmeken	22.27

=== Rally Bulgaria 2007, 6–8 July ===
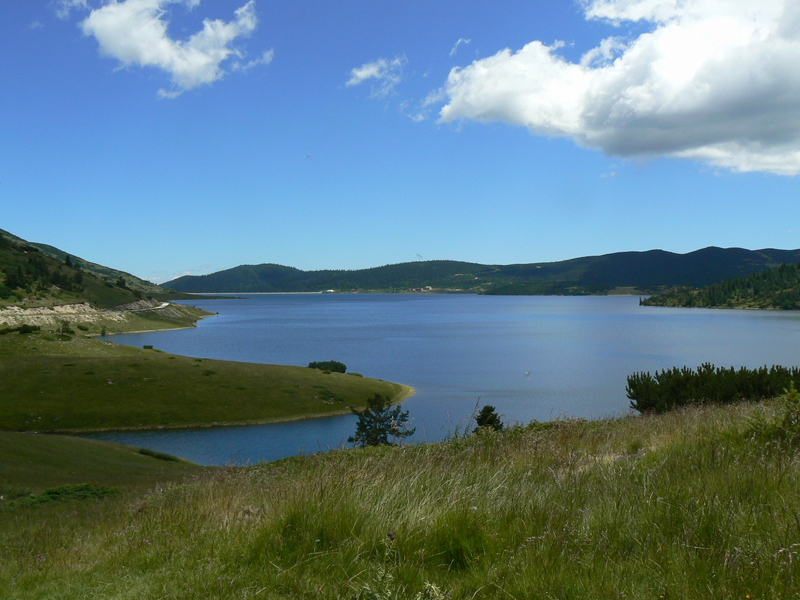
The area around Belmeken Dam (parts of the stage can be seen in the left of the dam and in the middle of the picture on the mountain)

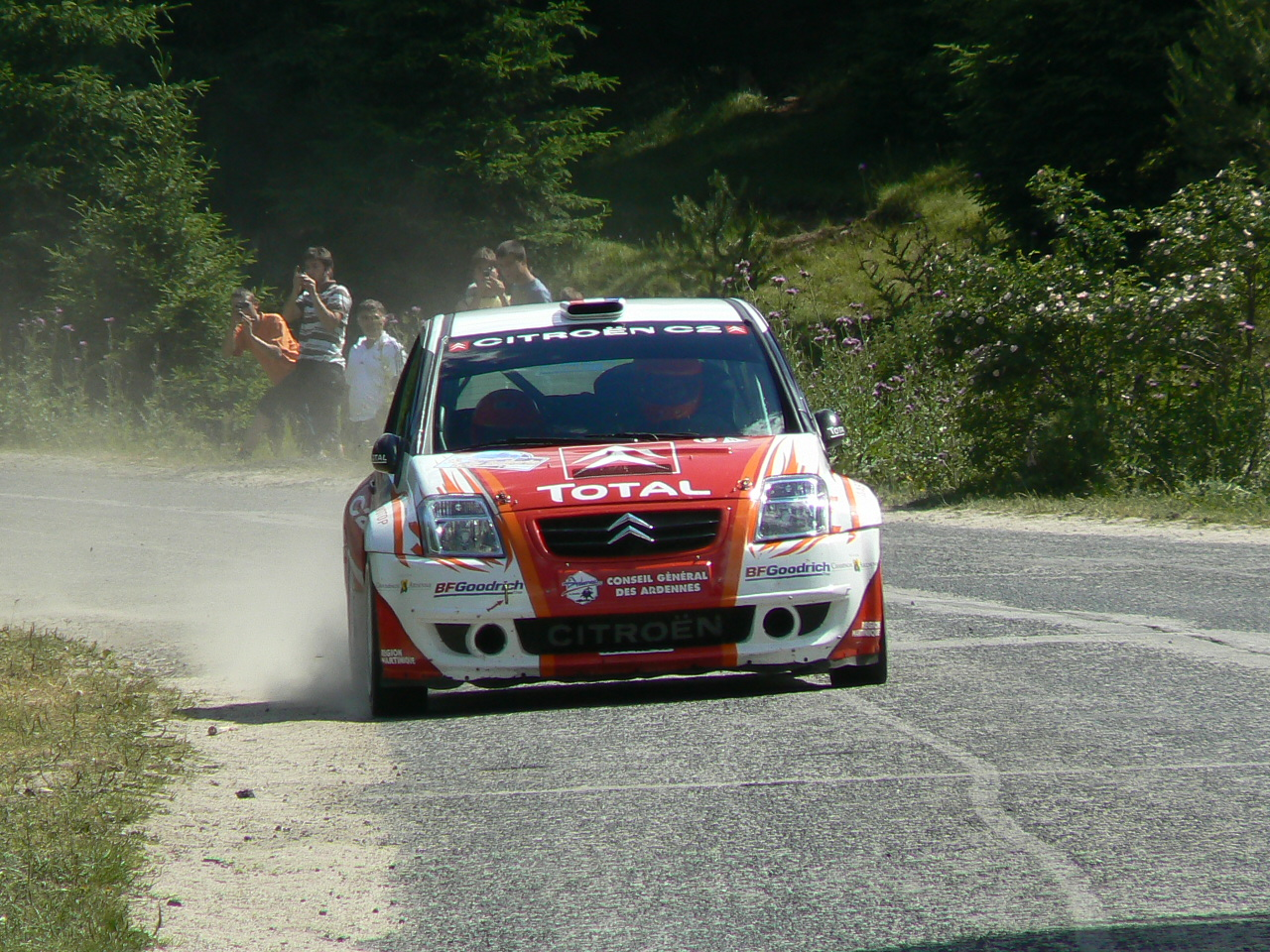
Simon Jean-Joseph and Jack Boyere on SS7 Yundola 2

For the next 2007 organizers decided to put "Yundola" (and reversed "Belovo") stage back in the itinerary after the road repairs were already finished. So, the "Velingrad" (and reversed "Varvara") stage were removed and the route of the rally went back to its already classical shape last used in 2005.

At least, there was a difference if we compare the 2007 itinerary with that one from 2005 – the renovated "Yundola" stage was shortened by 170m, while its reversed variant "Belovo" was lengthened by 160m. Apart from that, the shakedown test remained on its usual place – on the 4-kilometer part of the former "Tsarska Bistritsa" stage.

List of stages: Leg 1

Number	Name	Length (km)
SS1	Borovets	2.95
SS2	Muhovo	28.89
SS3	Slavovitsa	18.24
SS4	Sestrimo 1	30.11
SS5	Yundola 1	18.40
SS6	Sestrimo 2	30.11
SS7	Yundola 2	18.40

Leg 2

Number	Name	Length (km)
SS8	Magistrala 1	18.24
SS9	Tserovo 1	29.08
SS10	Magistrala 2	18.24
SS11	Tserovo 2	29.08
SS12	Belovo	18.60
SS13	Belmeken	22.27

=== Rally Bulgaria 2008, 11–13 July ===
In 2008 the rally was a World Rally Championship Candidate Event for the first time in its history. For that reason months before the rally, FIA sent some of their experts to Borovets in order to explore resort's possibilities to welcome a rally event from this class.

Of course, itinerary in the shape from 2003 to 2007 wouldn't be enough to form the required at that time 340–380 km of special stages for WRC event, so the searching for new stages (with alternative and escape roads) was the main objective to the organizers, which FIA's experts appointed.

The other change was the location of the shakedown test, because the one, used till 2007, was too far from the main Service Park of the rally (for that reason it had its "own" Service Park, which was a minus to the rally).

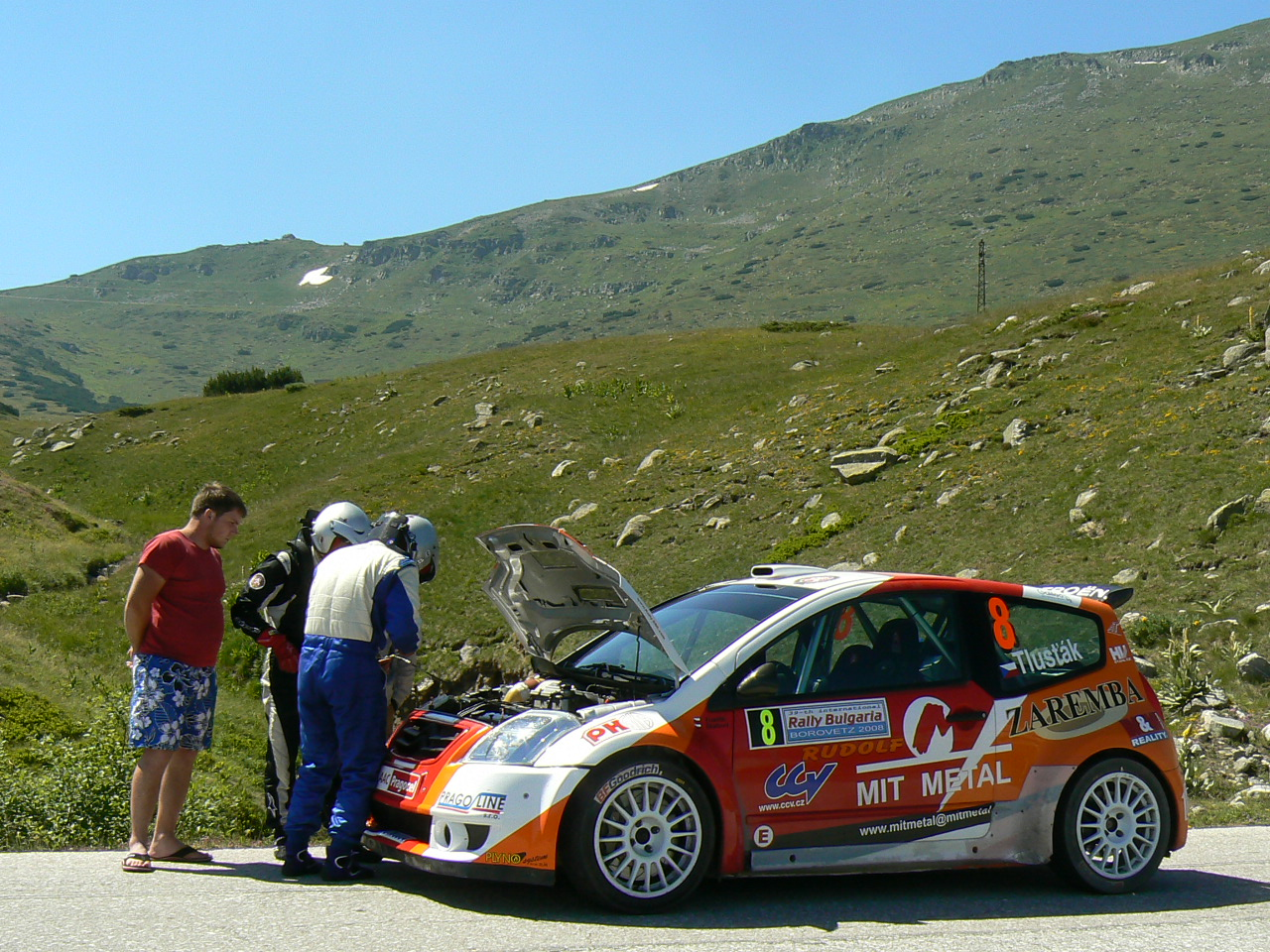
Antonín Tlusták and Jan Skaloud having problems on 2000m above the sea – on SS6 Sestrimo 2

Unfortunately, the new shakedown, which an expert from FIA chose, later was considered as the weakest point of Rally Bulgaria 2008. Despite it was very well situated to the main Service Park (just about 4.5 km away), the test was too fast and with too long straits, which had nothing in common with the characteristics of the stages. That was the reason why it was the first and probably the last time this shakedown was used.

Another change in the rally, which was more formal and on paper than anything else, was introduction of three competitive Days again (the term Leg was removed). But the first Day consisted of only SS1 Borovets (2.95 km), which was run alone on Friday late afternoon.

As for the stages, the itinerary of the 39th Rally Bulgaria 2008 was absolutely the same as this one from the year before.

List of stages: Days 1 & 2

Number	Name	Length (km)
SS1	Borovets	2.95
SS2	Muhovo	28.89
SS3	Slavovitsa	18.24
SS4	Sestrimo 1	30.11
SS5	Yundola 1	18.40
SS6	Sestrimo 2	30.11
SS7	Yundola 2	18.40

Day 3

Number	Name	Length (km)
SS8	Magistrala 1	18.24
SS9	Tserovo 1	29.08
SS10	Magistrala 2	18.24
SS11	Tserovo 2	29.08
SS12	Belovo	18.60
SS13	Belmeken	22.27

=== Rally Bulgaria 2009, 17–19 July ===
The 40th anniversary of Rally Bulgaria was the most important event of its history. The year 2009 marked the running of the event, from which depended if it will be part of the 2010 World Rally Championship or not.

For that reason there were more significant changes made in the itinerary since 2002. As a beginning, the most noticeable change was the absence of the shortest stage of the event – "Borovets". Instead, the rally started right off with the proper long stages, first of which was the reverse running of "Sestrimo" stage, which in the past (from 2003 to 2008) was called "Belmeken", and was driven as a last stage of the whole rally. For 2009 it was renamed "Lakavitsa" and was shortened with about 2 kilometers. Next stages were the already traditional "Muhovo" and "Slavovitsa", which we were used to see as the openers of this first competitive Day. The changes didn't skip them and both were shortened as well – "Muhovo" was cut with 380m, while "Slavovitsa" was reduced with just 120m. But despite the unusual itinerary and the little changes made on the stages, all of the first Day's tests were well known to the competitors. What was going to be the new stuff of the rally would be seen on the next Day 2.

The second Day of Rally Bulgaria 2009 offered some brand-new roads, which weren't stages alone, but when connected with some previously used ones, made up almost new stages together. This was the case with "Sestrimo" stage, which saved its name, and which was Day 2's opener, but was really shortened from its start. In comparison with 2008, when it was 30.11 kilometers, in 2009 stage's length was "only" 23.68 km, as the first 17.87 km of them were completely new. After this new experience, the road joined with the well known last part of "Sestrimo" stage, which runs all along the Belmeken Dam till the finish. The next stage "Yundola" was longer with just 90m than in 2008, so the change there was insignificant.

Next of the itinerary was the stage, which we knew as "Tserovo" (the reversed variant of "Muhovo" stage). Like the new "Sestrimo", "Tserovo" also had big changes – it was shortened a bit by its start, but was seriously reduced by its finish (with almost 9 km). The main difference with the old "Tserovo" stage was its brand-new middle part, which passed through the village of Lyubnitsa, and which was exactly 8.95 kilometers long. This part was also the reason that the stage would be renamed after the village – "Lyubnitsa".

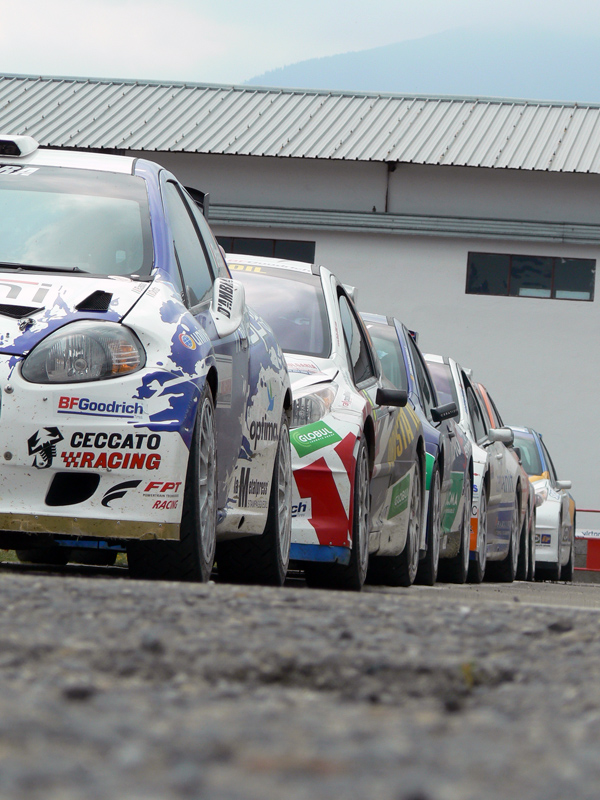
Rally cars were gathered in the entrance of the Service Park after the cancelling of the rally

The Shakedown test was also brand new, but like 2008 it was close to the main Service Park of the rally (just 6 km away). Shakedown's only "disadvantage" was its length of only 2.58 km, but despite this the Shakedown had everything – slow turns, fast straights, and road, which was open on some places and narrow on other.

But the rally sport sometimes could be really dangerous – on the opening stage of rally's second competitive Day the Swiss driver Brian Lavio and his Italian co-driver Flavio Guglielmini crashed heavily approximately 10 km into the new part of "Sestrimo" stage. Unfortunately, this crash costed the life of Flavio Guglielmini, who died immediately. As a result, firstly the other crews refused to continue the race, as these ones, who started the stage in front of Lavio and Guglielmini's car passed non-competitively through the next two stages before the Service Park – "Yundola" and "Lyubnitsa" – in order to cover 50% of rally's competitive kilometers. The others went back to the Service Park through the alternative road of "Sestrimo" stage, and when all of the crews gathered there, the rally was announced cancelled with a pro-term winner Giandomenico Basso (previously co-driven by late Flavio Guglielmini). The ceremonial finish was also cancelled.

List of stages: Day 1

Number	Name	Length (km)
SS1	Lakavitsa 1	20.41
SS2	Muhovo 1	28.51
SS3	Slavovitsa 1	18.12
SS4	Lakavitsa 2	20.41
SS5	Muhovo 2	28.51
SS6	Slavovitsa 2	18.12

Day 2

Number	Name	Length (km)
SS7	Sestrimo 1	23.68
SS8	Yundola 1	18.49
SS9	Lyubnitsa 1	24.00
SS10	Sestrimo 2	23.68
SS11	Yundola 2	18.49
SS12	Lyubnitsa 2	24.00

=== Rally Bulgaria 2010, 9–11 July ===
In 2010, the 41st Rally Bulgaria celebrated a remarkable edition of its history – the event was part of the World Rally Championship (WRC) for the first time since rally's initial running in 1970. For that reason Rally Bulgaria had to reply all the requirements of the FIA in order to be part of the WRC. One of the most important of them is the competitive kilometers, which, in its previous editions, were appropriate only for the European Rally Championship (250–270 km), for which the rally counted. Now FIA requires additional about 50 to 100 km by the Bulgarian rally. The organizers have solved this problem by adding some of the special stages around towns of Peshtera and Batak, last run 8 years ago, in 2002, which was the first time, when Borovets ski resort was the host of the rally. Interesting fact is that these stages are also part of another rally of the Bulgarian Rally Championship – International Rally Hebros.

One of the biggest differences in comparison with 2009 is the absence of "Yundola" stage (and also its reversed variant "Belovo"). It was the only SS from last year without any alternative or escape road, because it was located in a mountain gorge with rocks on the one side of the road and river and rocks on the other.

As it is written above, some of the stages around towns of Peshtera and Batak will be used for the first time since 2002. Their names will be changed since the 33rd edition of the rally 8 years ago, while one of them (SS6/SS9 Peshtera) will be run also differently and will be shortened as well.

The Shakedown remains the same as in 2009 (despite it will be a bit lengthened), when it was used for the first time. The test stage will be situated between town of Momin Prohod and Gorna Vassilitsa village and will be 2.65 km long.

DAY 1:

SS1 of the rally will be "Batak Lake 1" (actually it is not a lake, but a dam). It will be the same as SS21 Dobra Voda 1 from Rally Bulgaria 2002, which also was the last SS of Rally Hebros 2009. An interesting fact is that this stage, with its almost 32 km, is the longest of the rally.

Then follows SS2 Belmeken Lake 1 (it is also a dam, rather than a lake). This stage covers much of the road of 2009's SS1/SS4 Lakavitsa. The finish point is the same as the year before, but stage's initial 7 kilometers are brand new. They have never been used as a part of a special stage before (since 2003 they have been a liaison section only). This year the stage is 27.57 km long rather than the 20.41 km of SS1/SS4 Lakavitsa in 2009. Another thing, raising interest here, is that in the half of the stage the rally reaches its highest point of 2059 meters above the sea level, which makes the rally maybe the highest event of the 2010 WRC after Rally Mexico.

Then a Service Park follows, after which the crews repeat both specials stages.

DAY 2:

The second competitive Day of Rally Bulgaria 2010 is the longest of the three in both terms of special stages and liaison sections.

It will start with SS5 Sestrimo 1, which, in 2010, will be 27.46 km long. The initial about 7 km of the stage were last used as a competitive mileage back in 2008 as part of the already classical 30.11-kilometer "Sestrimo" stage, while in 2009 they were only liaison section. Now, after those first kilometers, the competitors will turn right to the new part of the stage, firstly introduced in 2009. "Sestrimo" stage will finish just at the foot of Belmeken Dam's wall and will be run for the first time in such a variant.

The initial 9 km of the next SS6 Peshtera 1 will be the same as these of SS19/SS23 Sveti Konstantin from Rally Bulgaria 2002. After those first 9 km, the competitors will reach a junction and will turn right to begin the second part of the stage, which will use the first section of SS1/SS3 Batak Lake (another 9 km), but in a reverse direction – donwhilling. Actually, the finish point of "Peshtera" stage is on the same place as the start point of SS1/SS3 Batak Lake. SS6/SS9 Pesthera is 18.13 km in length.

SS7 Lyubnitsa 1 is 99% the same as in 2009, when its brand-new middle part was introduced. Unfortunately, after the accident of the mixed Swiss/Italian crew of Bryan Lavio and Flavio Guglielmini, which has happened on one of the preceding Special Stages and where the co-driver Guglielmini died, SS Lyubnitsa was only passed non-competitively by some of the crews. The only difference this year is that the stage will be extended by 860m and will be 24.86 km in length.

Then a Service Park follows, after which the crews repeat the specials stages.

DAY 3:

Day 3 is the most compact day of the whole rally, and we even could say that maybe it will be the most compact of the whole 2010 World Rally Championship. If we exclude the final liaison section from the closing Service Park to the HQ, Day 3 would have between 50% and 60% of Special Stages. So, with this closing road section, the competitive kilometers will be 48.41% of Day 3's itinerary.

The final competitive Day of the event is built by two stages, repeated twice – the classics SS11/SS13 Muhovo (29.53 km) and SS12/SS14 Slavovitsa (17.73 km). In comparison with 2009, Muhovo was 28.51 km, while Slavovitsa – 18.12 km, which means that this year Muhovo is extended by 1.02 km, but Slavovitsa – shortened by 390m.

These two stages, as well as "Lyubnitsa" stage from Day 2 (which is largely made by SS Muhovo's route), are the only stages, which don't have such a mountainous character like the rest of the tests. The highest point of the Day, which is part of SS Muhovo, and also is the finish point of SS Lyubnitsa, is just 861m. The majority of the competitive kilometers though are situated between 300 and 700 meters above sea level.

Interesting fact is that the route of "Slavovitsa" stage is located next to one of the busiest highways in Bulgaria – Trakya Highway, which connects the two biggest cities in the country – the capital Sofia and the second after it Plovdiv. Through short tunnels, the stage twists several times from right to the left under the highway.

Both runnings of the stages, of course, are separated by a Service Park. The last break in the Service is scheduled to be after the second loop through the stages, while later the crews will head for the Ceremonial Finish of the rally in front of the HQ Hotel Rila in the heart of Borovets.

List of stages: Day 1

Number	Name	Length (km)
SS1	Batak Lake 1	31.77
SS2	Belmeken Lake 1	27.57
SS3	Batak Lake 2	31.77
SS4	Belmeken Lake 2	27.57

Day 2

Number	Name	Length (km)
SS5	Sestrimo 1	27.46
SS6	Peshtera 1	18.13
SS7	Lyubnitsa 1	24.86
SS8	Sestrimo 2	27.46
SS9	Peshtera 2	18.13
SS10	Lyubnitsa 2	24.86

Day 3

Number	Name	Length (km)
SS11	Muhovo 1	29.53
SS12	Slavovitsa 1	17.73
SS13	Muhovo 2	29.53
SS14	Slavovitsa 2	17.73

For the record, this is, so far, the last WRC event in Bulgaria.

== Previous winners ==
Year	Driver	Co-driver	Car	Championship
1970	(West Germany) Reiner Altenheimer	(West Germany) Hellenz Koller	Porsche 911	Cup of Peace and Friendship
1971	(Bulgaria) Ilia Tchoubrikov	(Bulgaria) Kolio Tchoubrikov	Alpine-Renault A110 1600	Cup of Peace and Friendship
1972	(Poland) Sobiesław Zasada	(Poland) Richard Ziskowski	Porsche 911	European Rally Championship
1973	(Italy) Sergio Barbasio	(Italy) Luigi Macaluso	Fiat 124 Abarth	European Rally Championship
1974	(Hungary) Attila Ferjancz	(Hungary) Jeno Zsemberi	Renault 12 Gordini	European Rally Championship
1975	(Italy) Fulvio Bacchelli	(Italy) Bruno Scabini	Fiat 124 Abarth	European Rally Championship
1976	(Poland) Andrzej Jaroszewicz	(Poland) Richard Ziskowski	Lancia Stratos HF	European Rally Championship
1977	(West Germany) Reiner Altenheimer	(West Germany) Dieter Norwig	Porsche Carrera	European Rally Championship
1978	(Austria) Franz Wittmann Sr.	(West Germany) Helmut Deimel	Opel Kadett	European Rally Championship
1979	(Spain) Antonio Zanini	(Spain) Juan José Petisco	Fiat Abarth 131	European Rally Championship
1980	(Spain) Antonio Zanini	(Spain) Jordi Sabater	Porsche 911 SC	European Rally Championship
1981	(Italy) Adartico Vudafieri	(Italy) Arnaldo Bernacchini	Fiat Abarth 131	European Rally Championship
1982	(Italy) Andrea Zanussi	(Italy) Arnaldo Bernacchini	Fiat Abarth 131	European Rally Championship
1983	(Spain) Antonio Zanini	(Spain) Pedro García	Talbot Lotus	European Rally Championship
1984	(Italy) Carlo Capone	(United States) Sergio Cresto	Lancia 037 Rally	European Rally Championship
1985	(Italy) Dario Cerrato	(Italy) Giuseppe Cerri	Lancia 037 Rally	European Rally Championship
1986	(Spain) Benigno Fernandez	(Spain) José López Orozco	Opel Manta 400	European Rally Championship
1987	(Belgium) Patrick Snijers	(Belgium) Dany Colebunders	Lancia Delta HF 4WD	European Rally Championship
1988	(Italy) Fabio Arletti	(Italy) Leonardo Julli	Lancia Delta HF 4WD	European Rally Championship
1989	(Belgium) Robert Droogmans	(Belgium) Ronny Joosten	Ford Sierra RS Cosworth	European Rally Championship
1990	(Italy) Fabrizio Tabaton	(Italy) Maurizio Imerito	Lancia Delta Integrale 16V	European Rally Championship
1991	(Italy) Piero Liatti	(Italy) Luciano Tedeschini	Lancia Delta Integrale 16V	European Rally Championship
1992	(Germany) Erwin Weber	(Germany) Manfred Hiemer	Mitsubishi Galant VR-4	European Rally Championship
1993	(France) César Baroni	(France) Hervé Sauvage	Lancia Delta HF Integrale	European Rally Championship
1994	(Belgium) Patrick Snijers	(Belgium) Dany Colebunders	Ford Escort RS Cosworth	European Rally Championship
1995	(Italy) Enrico Bertone	(Italy) Max Chiapponi	Toyota Celica Turbo 4WD	European Rally Championship
1996	(Italy) Enrico Bertone	(Italy) Max Chiapponi	Ford Escort RS Cosworth	European Rally Championship
1997	(Poland) Krzysztof Hołowczyc	(Poland) Maciej Wisławski	Subaru Impreza 555	European Rally Championship
1998	(Italy) Alex Fiorio	(Italy) Nadia Mazzon	Ford Escort RS Cosworth	European Rally Championship
1999	(Italy) Enrico Bertone	(Italy) Nicola Arena	Renault Mégane Maxi	European Rally Championship
2000	(Belgium) Bruno Thiry	(Belgium) Stéphane Prévot	Citroën Xsara Kit Car	European Rally Championship
2001	(Germany) Armin Kremer	(Germany) Fred Berßen	Toyota Corolla WRC	European Rally Championship
2002	(Poland) Leszek Kuzaj	(Belgium) Erwin Mombaerts	Toyota Corolla WRC	European Rally Championship
2003	(Belgium) Bruno Thiry	(Belgium) Jean-Marc Fortin	Peugeot 206 WRC	European Rally Championship
2004	(Italy) Luca Pedersoli	(Italy) Daniele Vernuccio	Peugeot 306 Maxi	European Rally Championship
2005	(Italy) Giandomenico Basso	(Italy) Mitia Dotta	Fiat Punto Super 1600	European Rally Championship
2006	(Italy) Giandomenico Basso	(Italy) Mitia Dotta	Fiat Grande Punto Abarth S2000	European Rally Championship
2007	(Bulgaria) Dimitar Iliev	(Bulgaria) Yanaki Yanakiev	Mitsubishi Lancer Evo IX	European Rally Championship
2008	(Bulgaria) Krum Donchev	(Bulgaria) Stoyko Valchev	Peugeot 207 S2000	European Rally Championship
2009	(Italy) Giandomenico Basso	(Italy) Mitia Dotta	Fiat Grande Punto Abarth S2000	European Rally Championship
2010	(France) Sébastien Loeb	(Monaco) Daniel Elena	Citroën C4 WRC	World Rally Championship
2011	(Italy) Luca Rossetti	(Italy) Matteo Chiarcossi	Fiat Grande Punto Abarth S2000	European Rally Championship
2012	(Bulgaria) Dimitar Iliev	(Bulgaria) Yanaki Yanakiev	Škoda Fabia S2000	European Rally Championship
2013	(Bulgaria) Dimitar Iliev	(Bulgaria) Yanaki Yanakiev	Škoda Fabia S2000	European Rally Cup
2014	(Bulgaria) Krum Donchev	(Bulgaria) Petar Yordanov	Ford Fiesta R5	European Rally Trophy
2015	(Turkey) Murat Bostanci	(Turkey) Onur Vatansever	Ford Fiesta R5	European Rally Trophy
2016	(United Arab Emirates) Rashid Al-Ketbi	(Germany) Karina Hepperle	Škoda Fabia R5	Balkan Rally Trophy
2017	(Turkey) Yagiz Avci	(Turkey) Bahadir Gücenmez	Peugeot 208 T16	Balkan Rally Trophy
2018	(Bulgaria) Miroslav Angelov	(Bulgaria) Edi Sivkov	Skoda Fabia R5	Balkan Rally Trophy
2019	(Bulgaria) Dimitar Iliev	(Bulgaria) Petar Stoychev	Škoda Fabia R5	Balkan Rally Trophy
2021	(Bulgaria) Miroslav Angelov	(Bulgaria) Georgi Gadzhev	Škoda Fabia Rally2 evo	Balkan Rally Trophy
2023	(Bulgaria) Martin Surilov	(Bulgaria) Zdravko Zdravkov	Citroën C3 Rally2	European Rally Trophy

== See also ==
- World Rally Championship
- 2010 World Rally Championship season
