= Boucles de Spa =

Belgian motor rally

The Boucles de Spa was a rally held around the town of Spa, Belgium from 1953 to 2014. It was a round of the European Rally Championship from the 1970s to the 2000s. The event was not held in 2005, and it became a classic rally for the 2006.

== Winners ==
- 1953 Richard - Volkswagen
- 1954 Gendebien - Wascher - Aston Martin
- 1955 No finishers - all out of time
- 1956 Evrard - Collignon - Ford Anglia
- 1962 Sander - Sander - DAF 33
- 1963 Event cancelled
- 1964 Staepaelere - Meeuwissen - Lotus Cortina
- 1965 Mombaerts - Mosbeaux - Lotus Elan
- 1966 Staepaelere - Christiaens - Ford Cortina GT
- 1967 Haxhe - Tricot - Lotus Elan
- 1968 Jacquemin - "Chavan" - Renault 8 Gordini
- 1969 Jacquemin - Demey - Alpine 110
- 1970 "Chavan" - Van Gutshoven - Alfa Romeo Duetto
- 1971 "Pedro" - "Jimmy" - BMW 2002 Tii
- 1972 Adriensens - Daemers - BMW 2002 Tii
- 1973 Haxhe - Delferrier - DAF 66
- 1974 Brink - Idel - Porsche Carrera
- 1975 Gilbert Staepaelere - Symens - Ford Escort RS1800
- 1976 Blomqvist - Sylvan - Saab 99 EMS
- 1977 Pond - Fred Gallagher - Triumph TR7
- 1978 Dumont - Materne - Opel Kadett GTE
- 1979 Kleint - Wanger - Opel Ascona 1.9
- 1980 Blomqvist - Cederberg - Saab 99 Turbo
- 1981 Snijers - Eric Symens - Ford Escort RS1800
- 1982 Colsoul - Lopes - Opel Ascona 400
- 1983 Duez - Lux - Audi Quattro
- 1984 Capone - Cresto - Lancia 037 Rally
- 1985 Waldegård - Thorszelius - Audi Quattro
- 1986 Probst - De Canck - Ford Sierra 4x4
- 1987 Snijers - Colebunders - Lancia Delta HF 4WD
- 1988 Snijers - Colebunders - BMW M3
- 1989 Snijers - Colebunders - Toyota Celica GT-Four ST165
- 1990 Saby - Grateloup - Lancia Delta Integrale
