= Horacio Macedo =

Horacio Macedo may refer to:

- Horácio Macedo (rally driver) (born 1930), Portuguese rally driver
- Horacio Macedo (footballer) (born 1963), Mexican football manager and former player
