= Rally Costa Smeralda =

Rally Costa Smeralda is a rally competition held in Costa Smeralda, a coastal area on the island of Sardinia, Italy. The event was first held in 1978 and it was part of the European Rally Championship schedule until 1994. The rally was restarted in 1998, and was included in the Italian Rally Championship until 2013. For the 2018 edition, the Costa Smeralda became a classic rally.

The rally is based in Arzachena in the north-east part of the island. Unlike the famed tarmac rally held on near neighbour the island of Corsica, the Tour de Corse, the Rally Costa Smeralda is a gravel rally. Italian drivers have long dominated the rally; the most successful driver in the rally's history is Italy's Paolo Andreucci who won the rally seven times between 2001 and 2013.

== Winners ==
Season	Driver	Car
1978	(Italy) Maurizio Verini	Fiat 131 Abarth
1979	(Italy) Attilio Bettega	Fiat 131 Abarth
1980	(France) Bernard Darniche	Lancia Stratos HF
1981	(Finland) Markku Alén	Fiat 131 Abarth
1982	(Italy) Michele Cinotto	Audi Quattro
1983	(Italy) Miki Biasion	Lancia Rally 037
1984	(Finland) Henri Toivonen	Porsche 911
1985	(Italy) Dario Cerrato	Lancia Rally 037
1986	(Finland) Henri Toivonen	Lancia Delta S4
1987	(Finland) Juha Kankkunen	Lancia Delta HF 4WD
1988	(Finland) Markku Alén	Lancia Delta Integrale
1989	(Italy) Dario Cerrato	Lancia Delta Integrale
1990	(Italy) Dario Cerrato	Lancia Delta Integrale 16V
1991	(Finland) Juha Kankkunen	Lancia Delta Integrale 16V
1992	(France) Didier Auriol	Lancia Delta HF Integrale
1993	Cancelled	
1994	(Italy) Piero Liatti	Subaru Impreza 555
1995 – 1997	Not held	
1998	(Italy) Giuseppe Grossi	Toyota Celica GT-Four ST205
1999	(Italy) Daniele Griotti	Subaru Impreza WRX STI
2000	(Italy) Michele Gregis	Subaru Impreza WRX STI
2001	(Italy) Paolo Andreucci	Ford Focus WRC
2002	(Italy) Luca Cantamessa	Subaru Impreza WRC
2003	(Finland) Harri Rovanperä	Peugeot 206 WRC
2004	(Italy) Andrea Navarra	Subaru Impreza WRX STI
2005	(Italy) Andrea Navarra	Mitsubishi Lancer Evolution IX
2006	(Italy) Paolo Andreucci	Fiat Grande Punto Abarth
2007	(Italy) Piero Longhi	Subaru Impreza WRX STI
2008	(Italy) Paolo Andreucci	Mitsubishi Lancer Evolution IX
2009	(Italy) Paolo Andreucci	Peugeot 207 S2000
2010	(United Kingdom) Kris Meeke	Peugeot 207 S2000
2011	(Italy) Paolo Andreucci	Peugeot 207 S2000
2012	(Italy) Paolo Andreucci	Peugeot 207 S2000
2013	(Italy) Paolo Andreucci	Peugeot 207 S2000
2014	(Italy) Renato Travaglia	Peugeot 207 S2000
2015	(Italy) Giuseppe Dettori	Škoda Fabia S2000
2016	(Switzerland) Federico Della Casa	Škoda Fabia R5
2017	(Italy) Giuseppe Dettori	Škoda Fabia R5
