= Fred Gallagher (co-driver) =

British rally co-driver (born 1952)

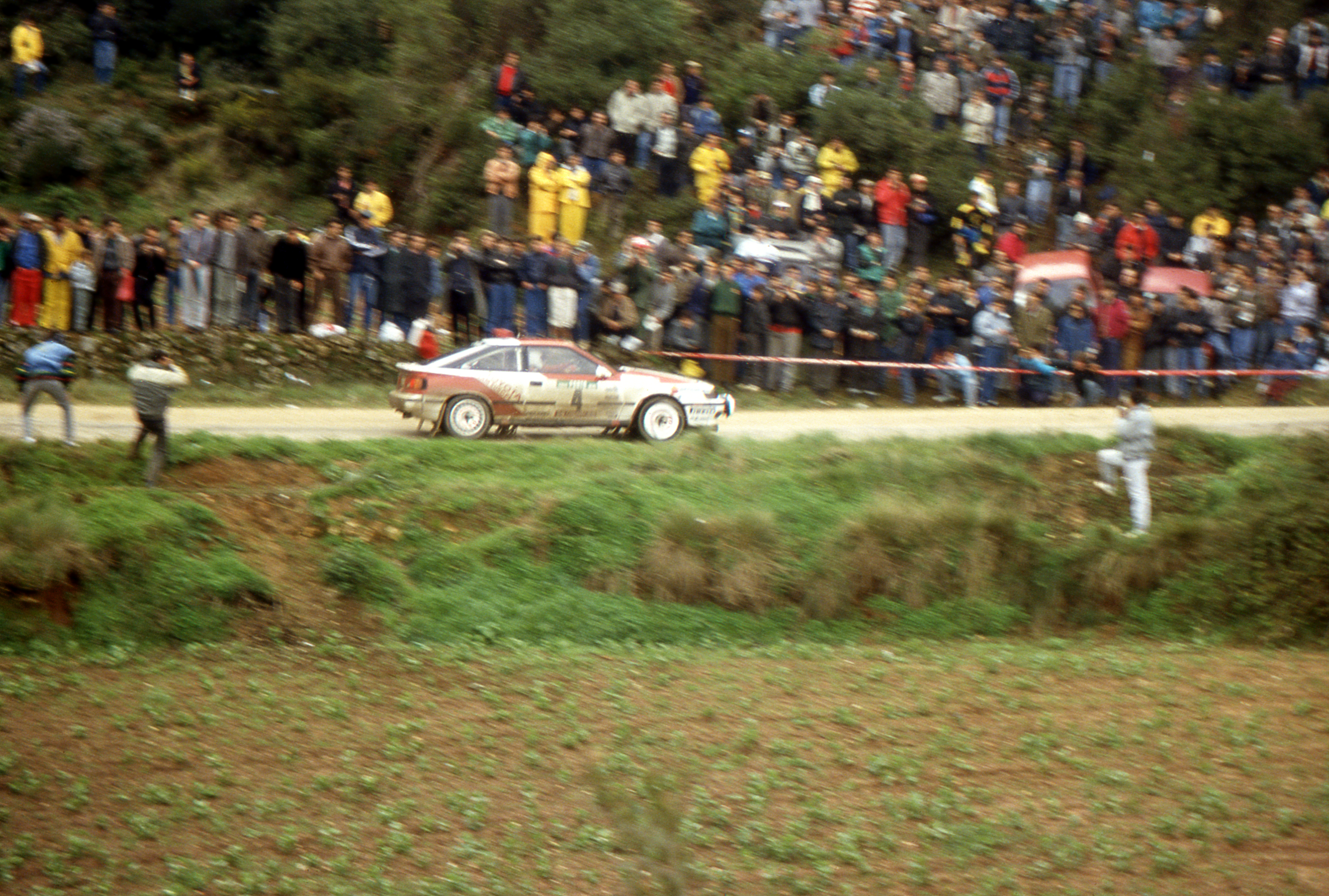
- Gallagher and Björn Waldegård competing at the 1989 Rallye de Portugal

Personal information
- Nationality: (United Kingdom) British
- Born: April 16, 1952 (age 74); Belfast, Northern Ireland

World Rally Championship record
- Years active: 1975–1992, 1998–1999
- Driver: (Norway) John Haugland (United Kingdom) Tony Pond (Finland) Simo Lampinen (Finland) Henri Toivonen (Finland) Juha Kankkunen (United States) John Buffum (Sweden) Björn Waldegård (United Kingdom) George Donaldson (Finland) Ari Vatanen (France) Simon Jean-Joseph (Sweden) Thomas Rådström (Norway) Petter Solberg
- Teams: Škoda, British Leyland, Talbot, Opel, Toyota, Lancia, Ford
- Rallies: 69
- Championships: 0
- Rally wins: 5
- Podiums: 12
- First rally: 1975 RAC Rally
- First win: 1985 Safari Rally
- Last win: 1990 Safari Rally
- Last rally: 1999 Rally Australia

Fred Gallagher (born 16 April 1952 in Belfast) is a British former rally co-driver and motorsport personality.

Gallagher competed in the World Rally Championship for the Triumph, Talbot, Opel, Toyota and Ford factory teams, alongside drivers such as Henri Toivonen (1981-1983), Juha Kankkunen (1984-1985) and Björn Waldegård (1987-1992) and Ari Vatanen (1998). He claimed three wins at the Safari Rally in 1985, 1986 and 1990, and two at the Ivory Coast Rally in 1985 and 1986, all of them for Toyota Team Europe.

He also the Boucles de Spa in 1977 (with Tony Pond), the Ypres Rally in 1978 and 1980, the Rally Isle of Man in 1978 and 1980 (both with Pond) and 1983 (with Toivonen), and the Cyprus Rally in 1984 and 1988 (with John Buffum and Waldegård). In 1982 he was runner-up at the British Rally Championship.

Gallagher also competed in rally raid for the Citroën Sport factory team. He finished fourth at the 1992 Paris–Cape Town Rally with Waldegård. With Timo Salonen, he won the Rallye des Pharaons in 1993 and the Baja España-Aragón in 1994, while finishing fifth at the 1995 Granada–Dakar Rally. Partnering with Philippe Wambergue, he finished runner-up at the 1996 Granada–Dakar Rally. In 1997, Gallagher claimed the FIA Cross Country Rally World Cup alongside Vatanen, winning the Atlas Rally, Baja Portugal, Paris-Samarkand-Moscow and UAE Desert Challenge.

After retiring as a professional co-driver, Gallagher worked as a clerk of the course at the RAC Rally from 1996 to 2015, and a member of the FIA Rally Safety Group from 2001 to 2005.
