= Classic rally =

Classic rallying, or historic rallying, is a type of road rally suitable for most standard classic cars, with no special equipment needed (the equipment allowed depends on the particular rally). These rallies are more about enjoyment than speed, and can be a good introduction to historic motorsport (which also include race meetings, classic endurance, and hillclimbing). A classic road rally is not about speed; in fact, there are severe penalties for finishing too early. The idea of a rally is to travel from a point to another within a certain time (time controls), not too fast or too slow, trying to match a speed average set by the organizers.

== Classic rallies ==
Classic rallies can be classified as

- mixed competition and regularity rallies
- competitive regularity and endurance
- touring rally

In regularity rallies, a series of intermediate time controls must be visited in the correct order. At each control point, the team stops and has time recorded on a card. At the end of the event, the competitor who has visited all these controls and who has the fewest early or late penalties overall is the winner. Note that with the introduction of electronics, control points can be replaced by sensors which trigger the cars at their given time thanks to a transponder, enabling much accurate penalties system.

Endurance rallies are long-distance motor rallies for vintage, historic and classic cars.

Classic rallies attempt to relive the raw athleticism of the 1960s and 1970s with little outside support, as opposed to modern events, where parts are expendable and repairs faster. On the long rallies of yesteryear drivers had to drive roughly 3000 km exclusively up and down the French Alps against the clock while looking after the gearbox and every other part of the car, since changing them was impossible. Liège-Sofia-Liège is a prime example route, being almost a flat out drive from Belgium to Bulgaria and back, through the roughest roads the length of Yugoslavia and over the difficult passes like the Gavia and the Vivione in Italy. Service was wherever the service crews could reach and was usually limited to a change of tires, refueling and, if the team was lucky, only minor repairs, since any time used for service had to be made up on the road by the driver.

In the 1960s and 1970s more than half of the competitive distance on the classic rallies was run at night. For example, Monte Carlo Rally had long sections running through the Chartreuse Mountains between Chambéry and Grenoble before crossing the Rhone valley and continuing in what was often the deeply snowbound and ice covered Ardèche, all in the same night.

== The road book ==
In most events, participants are given a road book essential for the race. This map style book is a straightforward ball and arrow system to show the route. The name of tulip diagram, usually used to describe the road book diagrams come from the Tulip Rally (Tulpen rally) of the 1950s. It gives a diagrammatic representation of the road junction. Participants would be instructed to religiously follow the mileages on the left of the page to ensure that they were at the correct junction, for which an odometer could be used.

== Events ==
Famous rallies that now have a revival edition are for example:

- Safari Rally (2003-present)
- Monte Carlo Rally (1998-present)
- Acropolis Rally (2002-present)
- Rallye Sanremo (1986-present)
- Tulip Rally (1992-present)
- Tour de Corse (2001-present)
- Rali Vinho da Madeira (2019-present)
- Boucles de Spa (2006-2014)
- Lahti Historic Rally (2002-present)
- Liège-Sofia-Liège
- Lombard Rally Festival (2018-present)
- Rally Costa Brava (2004-present)
- Rally Costa Smeralda (2018-present)
- Rally Princesa de Asturias (2009-present)
- Rally Serras de Fafe e Felgueiras (2025-present)
- Tour de France Automobile (1992-present)
- Ypres Rally (1993-present)

The European Historic Rally Championship is held since 1989.

== See also ==
- Vintage car
- Classic car
- Historic motorsport
