= 2013 Rali Vinho da Madeira =

Rally da Madeira 2013 Rali Vinho da Madeira 2013
Round 9 of the ERC Cup
← Previous event	Next event →
- Host country: Portugal
- Rally base: Funchal
- Dates run: 2 – 4 August 2013
- Stages: 17 (234 km; 145 miles)
- Stage surface: Tarmac

Statistics
- Crews: 34 at start, 20 at finish

Overall results
- Overall winner: (Italy) Giandomenico Basso (France) Peugeot 207 S2000

The 54th Rali Vinho da Madeira was the 9th rally of 2013 ERC Cup. The Italian driver Giandomenico Basso in Peugeot 207 S2000, won his 4th title in Madeira. Bruno Magalhães was the best Portuguese, finishing in 2nd place.

== Results ==
Pos.	Driver	Co-Driver	Car	Time
1	(Italy) Giandomenico Basso	(Italy) Lorenzo Granai	(France) Peugeot 207 S2000	2h28m50.8s
2	(Portugal) Bruno Magalhães	(Portugal) Nuno R. Silva	(France) Peugeot 207 S2000	+07.3s
3	(Portugal) Miguel Nunes	(Portugal) João Paulo	(Japan) Mitsubishi Lancer X R4	+ 3m30.8s
4	(Portugal) Pedro Meireles	(Portugal) Mário Castro	(Czech Republic) Škoda Fabia S2000	+3m42.5s
5	(Italy) Luca Betti	(Italy) Francesco Pezzoli	(United Kingdom) Ford Fiesta S2000	+4m04.1s
6	(Portugal) Filipe Freitas	(Portugal) Daniel Figueiroa	(Japan) Mitsubishi Lancer X R4	+5m36s
7	(Portugal) Filipe Pires	(Portugal) Vasco Rodrigues	(Japan) Mitsubishi Lancer X	+9m11.2s
8	(Portugal) Luís Serrado	(Portugal) João Sousa	(France) Peugeot 206 S1600	+10m53.7s
9	(Portugal) José Camacho	(Portugal) Fernando Spínola	(France) Peugeot 206 S1600	+13m08.3s
10	(Portugal) Rui Conceição	(Portugal) Duarte Coelho	(United Kingdom) Ford Escort Cosworth	+16m50.1s

=== Stage classification ===
Day	Stage	Designation	Length	Departure	Winner	Time	Av. Speed	Rally Leader
Day 1 2 August	SS1	Campo de Golfe 1	15,99 km	19:47	(Italy) Giandomenico Basso	10:05.1	95.13 km/h	(Italy) Giandomenico Basso
Day 1 2 August	SS2	Chão da Lagoa 1	22.01 km	20:30	(Portugal) Bruno Magalhães	13:55.9	94.56 km/h	(Portugal) Bruno Magalhães
Day 2 3 August	SS3	Campo de Golfe 2	15,99 km	10:53	(Italy) Giandomenico Basso	9:57.2	96.39 km/h	(Italy) Giandomenico Basso
Day 2 3 August	SS4	Chão da Lagoa 2	22,01 km	11:36	(Italy) Giandomenico Basso	13:46.9	95.82 km/h	(Italy) Giandomenico Basso
Day 2 3 August	SS5	Cidade de Santana 1	13,87 km	14:14	(Italy) Giandomenico Basso	8:54.9	93.35 km/h	(Italy) Giandomenico Basso
Day 2 3 August	SS6	Referta 1	14,29 km	14:49	(Italy) Giandomenico Basso	9:58.9	85.90 km/h	(Italy) Giandomenico Basso
Day 2 3 August	SS7	4 Estradas 1	15,13 km	15:17	(Italy) Giandomenico Basso	9:23.5	96.66 km/h	(Italy) Giandomenico Basso
Day 2 3 August	SS8	Cidade de Santana 2	13,87 km	17:33	(Italy) Giandomenico Basso	8:48.3	94.51 km/h	(Italy) Giandomenico Basso
Day 2 3 August	SS9	Referta 2	14,29 km	18:08	(Portugal) Bruno Magalhães	9:53.3	86.71 km/h	(Italy) Giandomenico Basso
Day 2 3 August	SS10	4 Estradas 2	15,13 km	18:36	(Italy) Giandomenico Basso	9:19.2	97.40 km/h	(Italy) Giandomenico Basso
Day 3 4 August								(Italy) Giandomenico Basso
Day 3 4 August	SS11	Paúl da Serra 1	10,92 km	10:25	(Italy) Giandomenico Basso	7:10.3	91.36 km/h	(Italy) Giandomenico Basso
Day 3 4 August	SS12	Ponta do Pargo 1	13,13 km	11:18	(Portugal) Bruno Magalhães	7:55.9	99.32 km/h	(Italy) Giandomenico Basso
Day 3 4 August	SS13	Rosário 1	11,52 km	12:05	(Portugal) Bruno Magalhães	7:10.0	96.45 km/h	(Italy) Giandomenico Basso
Day 3 4 August	SS14	Paúl da Serra 2	10,92 km	14:00	(Portugal) Bruno Magalhães	7:10.6	91.30 km/h	(Italy) Giandomenico Basso
Day 3 4 August	SS15	Ponta do Pargo 2	13,13 km	14:53	(Portugal) Bruno Magalhães	7:52.5	100.04 km/h	(Italy) Giandomenico Basso
Day 3 4 August	SS16	Rosário 2 (Power Stage)	11,52 km	15:40	(Portugal) Bruno Magalhães	07:08.6	96.76 km/h	(Italy) Giandomenico Basso
