= Horácio Macedo (rally driver) =

Portuguese rally driver

- Born: February 15, 1930 (age 96); Porto, Portugal
- Occupation: Rally driver

Horácio Carvalho de Macedo (born 15 February 1930) is a Portuguese rally driver.

== Private life ==
Macedo, born in Porto, Portugal, the son of a land and sugar factory owner Mauricio Carvalho de Macedo who founded RAR - Refinarias de Açúcar Reunidas on 20 March 1962 as the majority stakeholder. Through his mother, Almerinda Amélia Alves de Azevedo he is a noble descendant. He worked at the factories for many years of his life whilst taking on rally racing as a hobby, which he had great success in. He developed an interest in cars and motor racing at an early age.

== Rally racing ==
Macedo began his motor sport career with a Renault 4CV with which he won his first race, 1957 as National Champion followed by many other race wins. He then moved on to Chevrolet Corvette, Mercedes-Benz 300SL Gullwing and Ferrari 250 GT. With the last two cars, he was the three-time Portugal National Rally Champion. His Ferrari 250 GT SWB Berlinetta #2035GT is now in the Ralph Lauren car collection.

Macedo accumulated a series of titles of which the most notable ones were as National Champion in 1957 and National Champion of Grande Turismo Especial in 1957, National Champion of Grande Turismo Especial in 1958, National Champion of Grande Turismo 1960, National Champion in 1961, National Champion of Grande Turismo in 1961, National Champion of Grande Turismo in 1962, National Champion in 1963, and National Champion of Grande Turismo in 1963.

Macedo won several other championships which include the Rali Vinho da Madeira.
