= Henri Toivonen =

Finnish rally driver (1956–1986)

- Henri Toivonen during his Martini Racing era

Personal information
- Nationality: Finnish
- Full name: Henri Pauli Toivonen
- Born: 25 August 1956; Jyväskylä, Finland
- Died: 2 May 1986 (aged 29); Corsica, France

World Rally Championship record
- Years active: 1975–1986
- Co-driver: (Finland) Antero Lindqvist (Finland) Juha Paajanen (Finland) Juhani Korhonen (United Kingdom) Phil Boland (United Kingdom) Paul White (United Kingdom) Fred Gallagher (Finland) Juha Piironen (United Kingdom) Neil Wilson (United States) Sergio Cresto
- Teams: Talbot, Opel, Porsche, Lancia
- Rallies: 40
- Championships: 0
- Rally wins: 3
- Podiums: 9
- Stage wins: 185
- Total points: 194
- First rally: 1975 1000 Lakes Rally
- First win: 1980 Lombard RAC Rally
- Last win: 1986 Monte Carlo Rally
- Last rally: 1986 Tour de Corse

Henri Pauli Toivonen (25 August 1956 – 2 May 1986) was a Finnish rally driver born in Jyväskylä, the home of Rally Finland. His father, Pauli, was the 1968 European Rally Champion for Porsche and his younger brother, Harri, became a professional circuit racer.

Toivonen's first World Rally Championship victory came with a Talbot Sunbeam Lotus at the 1980 Lombard RAC Rally in Great Britain, just after his 24th birthday. He had the record of being the youngest driver ever to win a world rally until his countryman Jari-Matti Latvala won the 2008 Swedish Rally at the age of 22. After driving for Opel and Porsche, Toivonen was signed by Lancia. Despite nearly ending up paralysed at the Rally Costa Smeralda early in 1985, he returned to rallying later that year. He won the last event of the season, the RAC Rally, as well as the 1986 season opener, the Monte Carlo Rally, which his father had won exactly 20 years earlier.

Toivonen died in a crash on 2 May 1986 while leading the Tour de Corse rally in Corsica. His American co-driver, Sergio Cresto, also died when their Lancia Delta S4 plunged down a ravine and exploded. The crash had no close witnesses and the only remains of the car were the blackened spaceframe, making it impossible to determine the cause. Within hours, Jean-Marie Balestre, then President of the FISA, banned the powerful Group B rally cars from competing the following season, ending rallying's supercar era.

Toivonen started his career in circuit racing and was also very competitive on tarmac. He raced successfully in a European Endurance Championship event, achieved praise from Eddie Jordan, in whose Formula Three team Toivonen made a few guest appearances, and impressed in his Formula One test for March Grand Prix. The annual Race of Champions, originally organised in Toivonen's memory, awards the winning individual driver the Henri Toivonen Memorial Trophy.

== Early career ==
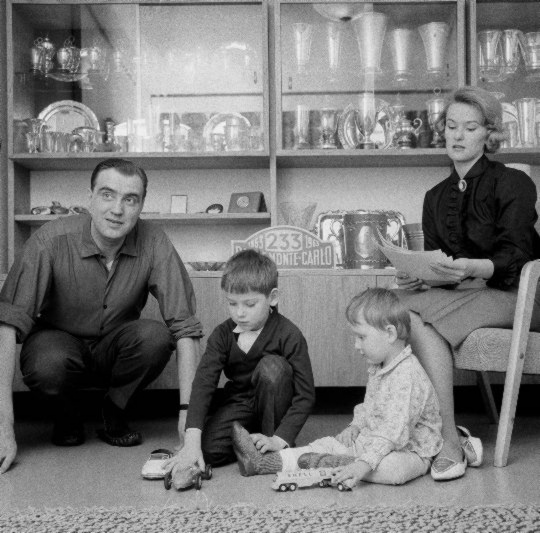
Pauli, Henri, Harri and Ulla Toivonen

Pauli and Henri Toivonen

Toivonen had strong ties to rallying at an early age. He was born in Jyväskylä, the city which has hosted the Rally Finland since 1951. His father, Pauli Toivonen, was a successful international rally driver who would go on to win the Monte Carlo, 1000 Lakes and Acropolis rallies and become the 1968 European Rally Champion. Henri Toivonen learned to drive when he was five years old, but despite his rallying connections, started competition in circuit racing. He began with karts and won the Finnish Cup in touring cars before switching to Formula Vee, winning one round of the Scandinavian Championship in his first year. Toivonen graduated to Formula Super Vee the following year and won a round of the European Championship, as well as becoming the 1977 Finnish Champion in the Formula Vee class. Due to his family's concerns about the safety of circuit racing, he switched to rallying full-time. Toivonen's kart was purchased by the parents of a six-year-old Mika Häkkinen, who would later be a two-time Formula One World Drivers' Champion.

Due to Finnish legislation, which at that time limited new drivers to a top speed of 80 kilometres per hour (50 mph) on open roads, Toivonen was unable to compete in rallying until he was 19 years old. With Antero Lindqvist as his co-driver, he made his World Rally Championship debut at the 1975 1000 Lakes Rally (now the Neste Oil Rally Finland), driving a privately entered Simca Rallye 2. He retired from the rally during the 36th special stage due to a broken sump. While still focusing on his circuit racing career, he competed in his second world rally two years later and finished fifth in the 1977 1000 Lakes in a Chrysler Avenger.

Toivonen started his 1978 season at the Arctic Rally, the second round of both the European Rally Championship and World Rally Championship's "FIA Cup for Drivers", the predecessor to the official drivers' world championship which was established in 1979. He finished second, 3:41 minutes behind Ari Vatanen, and over seven minutes ahead of Markku Alén, who would go on to win the Cup. Toivonen went on to compete in two world championship rallies for Citroën. Although he did not finish either event, his driving attracted attention; a private Porsche team offered Toivonen a car for the 1000 Lakes Rally, as did Chrysler for the Lombard RAC Rally. At his home event, Toivonen had to retire due to an engine failure, but he finished ninth at the RAC Rally. That same year, Toivonen captured his first rally win at the Nordic Rally, an event in the Finnish Rally Championship. In the 1979 season, he gathered rallying experience by competing in 15 rallies in the British, Finnish and European championships. Toivonen also competed in two WRC events: the 1000 Lakes with a Fiat 131 Abarth and the RAC with a Ford Escort RS. He retired from both, but at his home event he had been matching the pace of the leaders before leaving the road. These performances led to a contract with the factory Talbot Competition team for the 1980 season.

== Works career ==
=== Talbot (1980–81) ===
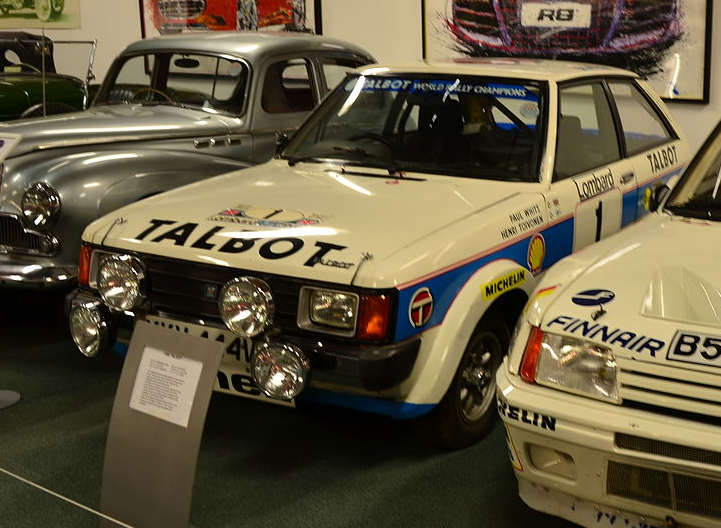
Henri Toivonen's Talbot Sunbeam Lotus

Toivonen's first season driving for a major car manufacturer's 'works' team was largely a trial year. He started the season by winning the Arctic Rally in January, but only drove his Talbot Sunbeam Lotus in four selected World Rally Championship events. His exuberant driving style often led to crashes, and his results were often not representative of his pace. In hopes of better results, the team partnered Toivonen with three different co-drivers during the season: Antero Lindqvist, Paul White and Neil Wilson. At the 1000 Lakes Rally, Toivonen retired due to an accident during the 11th special stage. At the next rally in Sanremo with Lindqvist, Toivonen finished fifth. In late November, Toivonen, this time partnered by White, surprised both experts and spectators by winning the Lombard RAC Rally, over four minutes ahead of runner-up Hannu Mikkola. Neither Toivonen nor Talbot were expected to be competitive in the rally. In an interview published in Autosport three days before the rally started, Toivonen himself had not expected to challenge for the win:

I don't think that I have done enough events to win the rally just by driving skill, for instance. If I win, it will be because I have a little bit of luck and some of the others have trouble. I mean, Hannu Mikkola knows the forests like the back of his hand so there is no use trying to drive to beat him. You have to wait for him to have trouble. Then you are in with a chance.

At 24 years and 86 days, Toivonen remained the youngest driver to win a WRC event until his countryman Jari-Matti Latvala won the 2008 Swedish Rally at the age of 22. Latvala stated that "It's a super feeling, it's almost unbelievable. Henri (Toivonen) was one of my idols and secretly I've always wanted to beat his record as the youngest winner." Over 20 years after the 1980 RAC, Paul White (nicknamed "Chalkie" by Toivonen) commented that he still receives questions about the rally and Henri Toivonen. He noted that the Talbot team, run by Des O'Dell and 15 full-time personnel, was much smaller than other works teams and "had to draft in 'mercenary' mechanics to help." Toivonen's results led to another year in the Talbot squad. In the 1981 season, he was signed up for a larger WRC programme and had a new co-driver, Fred Gallagher, who would later partner Juha Kankkunen and Björn Waldegård in a Toyota Celica Twincam Turbo. Toivonen's rear-wheel drive Group 2 Sunbeam Lotus was now less competitive against the Group 4 cars and the all-wheel-drive Audi Quattro, but despite four retirements, the second places at Rally Portugal and Sanremo, as well as a fifth place at the Monte Carlo Rally, resulted in a seventh place overall in the drivers' world championship. Together with more consistent teammate Guy Fréquelin, he brought Talbot a surprise manufacturers' title. He also competed in the last round of the British Open Rally Championship, the Audi Sport International Rally, and won the event.

=== Opel (1982–83) ===
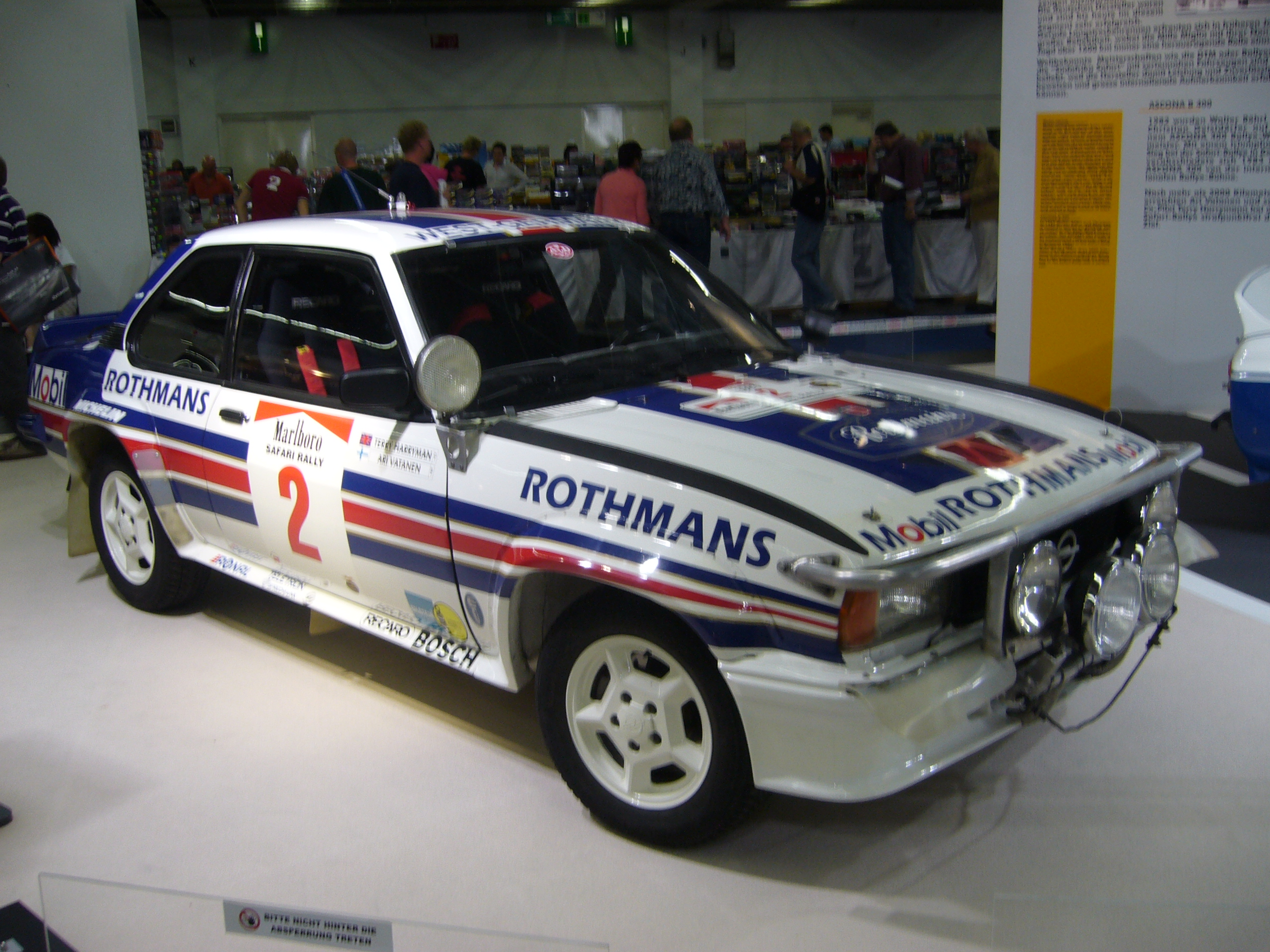
Rothmans Opel Rally Team's Opel Ascona 400

For the 1982 season, Toivonen switched to the Rothmans-sponsored Opel team, which was co-managed by David Richards. Toivonen's teammates were Ari Vatanen, who had won the previous year's championship (with Richards as his co-driver), the 1980 and 1982 world champion Walter Röhrl and Jimmy McRae, the previous year's British Rally Champion and father of future rally star Colin McRae. In his Ascona 400 debut in Portugal, Toivonen surprised the event favourites by leading the rally before retiring five stages from the finish. He competed in only four more WRC events, but finished on the podium twice, at the Acropolis Rally and at the RAC Rally. In the European Rally Championship, he participated in four rallies, registering three podiums and one retirement. He also made a guest appearance in one round of the British Formula Three circuit racing championship, where he finished tenth driving a Ralt RT3. In his Formula One test for March Grand Prix at the Silverstone Circuit, Toivonen was 1.4 seconds faster than the team's regular driver Raul Boesel.

Toivonen driving the Manta 400

Toivonen continued with Opel into the 1983 season, now driving the Manta 400, which took advantage of the new Group B regulations. Although the Manta was a Group B car, it was underpowered against the likes of the Audi Quattro A2 and Lancia 037, which were controlling the world rally scene at the time. Toivonen achieved a win at the Manx International Rally, a round of the British Open Rally Championship and the European Rally Championship, in the Isle of Man, at his first attempt. He also finished first at the Mille Pistes rally in France, but the organisers decided to ban the Group B cars halfway through the event. Toivonen and his co-driver, Ian Grindrod, received only a consolation trophy. In the World Rally Championship, he retired in three rallies, finished sixth at the Monte Carlo Rally and fourth at the Rallye Sanremo. He also drove a Ferrari 308 GTB at the San Marino Rally, where he was co-driven by Juha Piironen for the first time. The pair retired from the event, but Piironen would become his main co-driver for the next two seasons, and later have a long and successful partnership with four-time world champion Juha Kankkunen. In late October, Toivonen again competed on the circuits. This time he entered two sportscar races, driving a Porsche 956 for Richard Lloyd Racing in the European Endurance Championship. He only practiced the car at Imola and did not race, but in the next race at Mugello, partnered with Derek Bell and Jonathan Palmer, he finished third.

=== Porsche (1984) ===
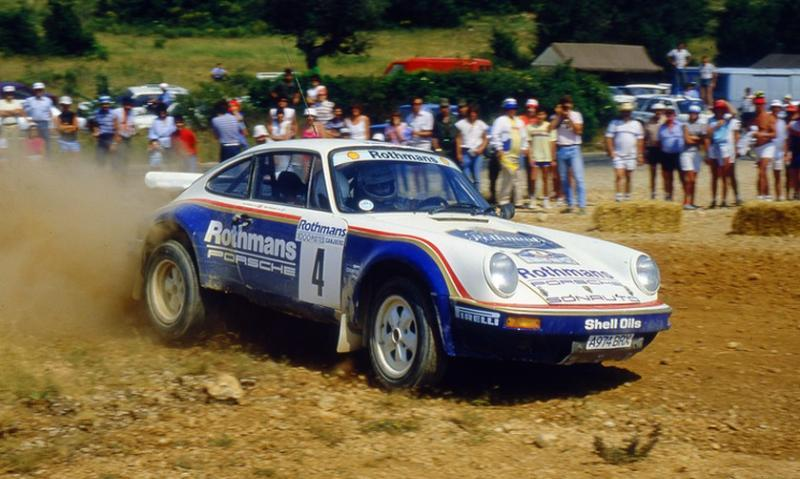
Toivonen driving a Porsche 911 SC RS at the 1984 Mille Pistes

After a score of ten starts, two podiums, three other top six finishes and five retirements, Toivonen left Opel Team Europe for the 1984 season. He was linked to the lead drive at the Peugeot Talbot Sport, Peugeot's new factory World Rally Championship team, but eventually signed to drive a Porsche 911 SC RS for the Rothmans-sponsored Porsche factory team in the European Rally Championship. The team was run by Prodrive, a new motorsport group set up by David Richards, Toivonen's former boss at Opel. His European season with Porsche turned out to be a success. He started with two retirements, a third and a second place, but went on to win five rallies in a row and led the championship from Italian Lancia driver Carlo Capone. As Toivonen had a contract with Lancia for the World Rally Championship, and Lancia boss Cesare Fiorio wanted Capone to win the European title, it was suggested that Fiorio might enter Toivonen in WRC events to keep him away from important ERC rounds. However, Toivonen's title campaign ended in a back injury and a resulting enforced rest that was expected to take up to two months. He missed several events and finished second in the championship behind Capone.

Toivonen's WRC contract with Lancia Martini consisted of five events. Fiorio stated that the team needed another top driver as "Audi will have four top drivers next year so it would be very difficult competing with only two." Toivonen had his Lancia 037 debut in Portugal with very limited testing experience: "It has been snowing in Italy every time I have been to try this car, so I don't know its limits." However, similarly to his Opel Ascona 400 debut at the same event two years ago, Toivonen immediately took the lead and set several fastest stage times before retiring. This time the retirement was not caused by a broken clutch, but a mistake and a crash by Toivonen. After a retirement also in Greece, he finished third in his home event, the 1000 Lakes Rally. These three remained Toivonen's only WRC events of the season as his back injury forced him to miss the Sanremo and RAC rallies. Before Sanremo, Markku Alén re-signed with Lancia and Fiorio stated he wanted to sign Toivonen with a similar two-year contract, depending on the condition of his back and his contractual situation with Rothmans Porsche, who had claimed Toivonen had already re-signed with them. Toivonen chose to become a full-fledged Lancia driver for the 1985 season.

=== Lancia (1985–86) ===
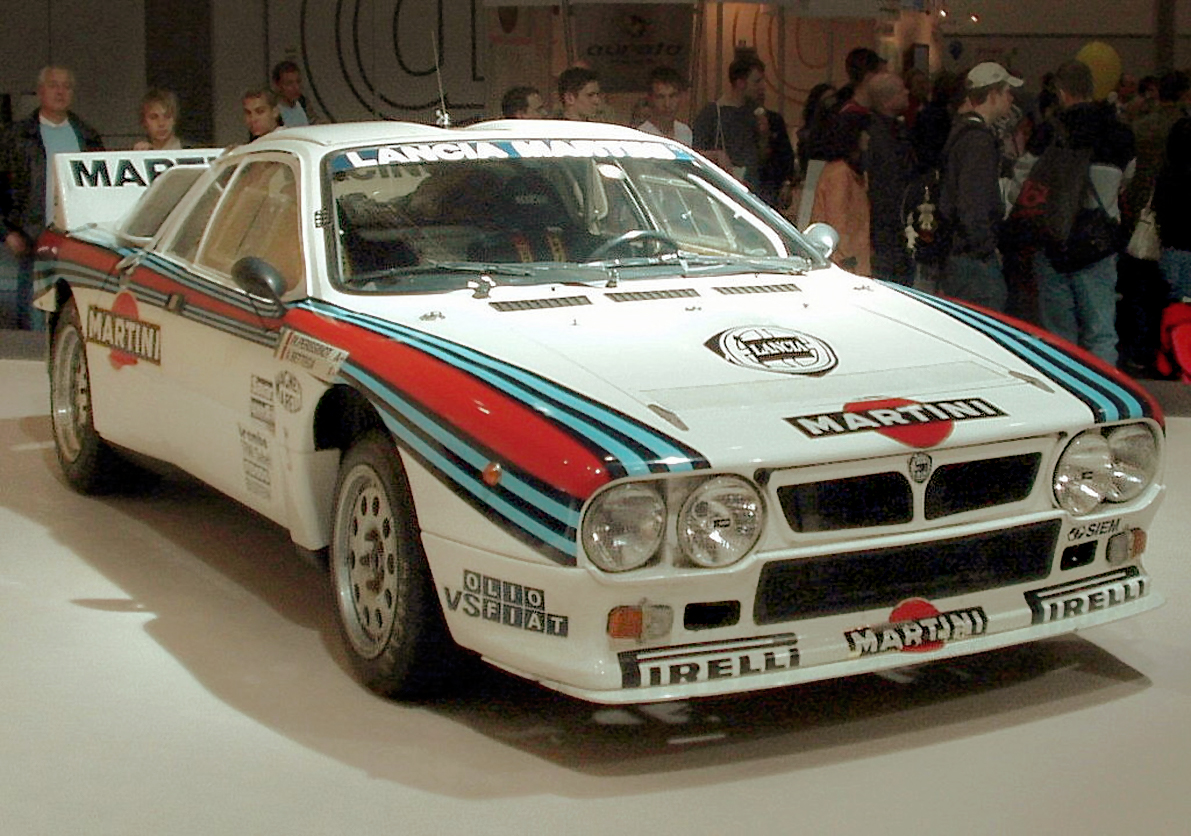
A factory team Lancia 037 Rally

The 1985 season started badly when Toivonen crashed his Lancia 037 into a brick wall at the Rally Costa Smeralda, in the European Championship, seriously injuring his back and breaking three vertebrae in his neck. At the beginning of May, Lancia drivers Toivonen and Alén lost a friend and team-mate, when Italian driver Attilio Bettega crashed fatally during the fourth special stage at the Tour de Corse. Toivonen made his comeback from his injuries at the 1000 Lakes Rally in August and finished fourth. He finished third at the next rally in Sanremo, his final event with the car. The 037 did not suit Toivonen's driving style and had fallen well behind Audi and Peugeot in terms of performance, as it was rear-wheel drive and had only 325 horsepower (242 kW) compared to the 440 of Peugeot and 500 of Audi. It was replaced by the Lancia Delta S4 for the final event of the season: the RAC Rally. The Delta S4 had all-wheel drive and was both supercharged and turbocharged, the former increasing power in the middle of the engine's speed range and the latter boosting power at higher engine speeds. The car could reportedly accelerate from 0 to 60 miles per hour (97 km/h) in 2.3 seconds, on a gravel road. The Delta S4 turned out to be a success. Toivonen won the rally and Alén finished second only 56 seconds behind. Although Toivonen competed in only four world rallies in 1985, his results placed him career-best sixth overall in the championship.

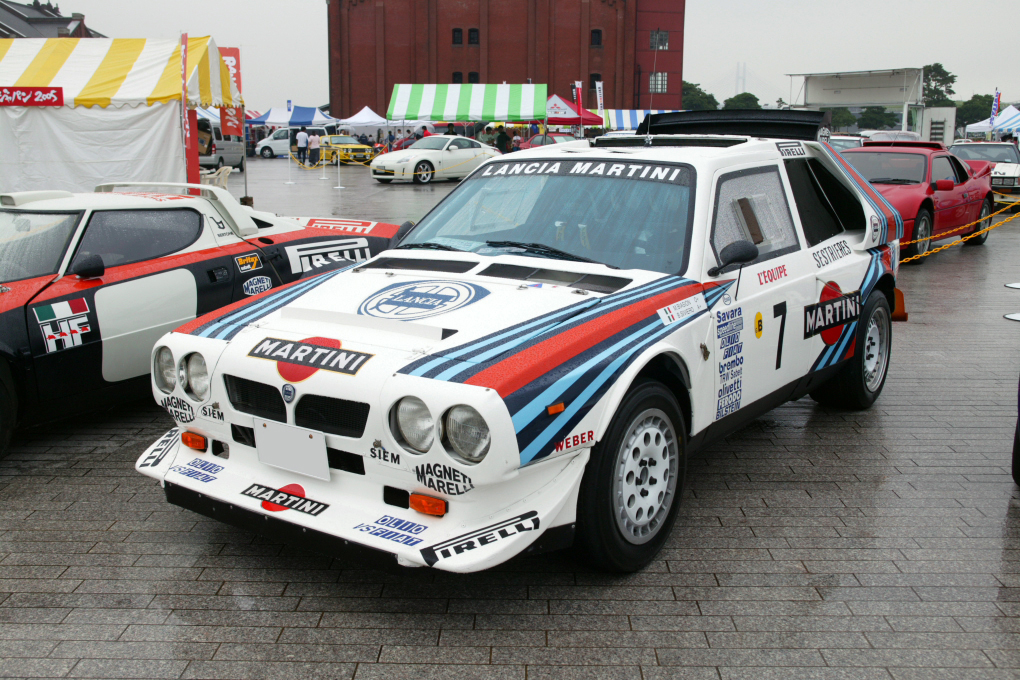
A Lancia Delta S4

The 1986 season started with a dominant win for Toivonen at the Monte Carlo Rally with new co-driver Sergio Cresto. Fellow "Flying Finns" Timo Salonen and Hannu Mikkola finished second and third. Toivonen's father, Pauli Toivonen, had won the event 20 years earlier after ten cars, including the first four to cross the finishing line, were disqualified due to having non-standard headlights. The disqualification had caused an uproar and Prince Rainier of Monaco refused to attend the prize-giving ceremony. Henri Toivonen's victory caused his father to comment "now the name of Toivonen has been cleared". The Monte Carlo win made Toivonen the favourite for the title. However, at the Swedish Rally he retired from the lead due to an engine failure. At the next rally in Portugal, Joaquim Santos lost control of his Ford RS200 on a special stage and plunged into the crowd. The accident killed three spectators and injured more than 30. Toivonen along with all the other factory team drivers decided to withdraw from the event, but Lancia disapproved of the retirement. Toivonen stated that "the Lancia team will not accept anything but a win." During the Portuguese rally, Toivonen is often reported to have tested his Delta S4 at the Estoril circuit and to have set a fastest lap time that would have qualified him in sixth position at the 1986 Portuguese Grand Prix. MTV3 and ESPN, citing Kankkunen and Fiorio, respectively, looked into the claim a few decades later and came to a skeptical conclusion. Red Bull explored the story further by interviewing former Lancia manager Ninni Russo, whose connections stated that Toivonen had made a time on the full circuit that "was in the first ten of the F1 cars from their test at Estoril two or three weeks before." Despite the setbacks, Toivonen remained the title favourite with no driver seeming able to match his pace.

== Death ==
After the accident, only the blackened space frame remained of Toivonen and Cresto's Lancia Delta S4.

The 1986 Tour de Corse, a world rally on narrow and very twisty mountain roads around the island of Corsica, began on Thursday, 1 May. Toivonen had a sore throat and was suffering from the flu, but he insisted on driving after having lost his championship lead during the last three rallies due to retiring the car in Sweden, the Lancia team withdrawing from the tragic Portugal event and Toivonen not even competing in the Kenyan Safari Rally. According to several sources, he was also taking medicine to treat fever. Despite his ill health, he was taking stage win after stage win and leading the 1017 km rally by a large margin. After the first leg, Toivonen commented:

This rally is insane, even though everything is going well at the moment. If there is trouble, for sure, I am completely finished."

Toivonen was complaining about the car being too fast and powerful for a rally like the Tour de Corse. He found it very hard to keep the 600 hp Lancia balanced on the road and admitted it was very exhausting. A number of other rally drivers driving other Group B cars in the rally shared his concerns, and in a short interview before he steered his Lancia into the 18th stage, Toivonen made a comment which would remain his last words in public:

Today, we have driven more than the whole distance of the 1000 Lakes Rally (Finnish Rally). After 4 hours of driving- it's hard to keep up with the speed. So, with a modern car like this, it's just impossible to race here. It's physically exhausting and the brains can't keep up with it anymore.

During the second leg, on Friday, 2 May, at the seventh kilometre of the 18th stage, Corte–Taverna, Toivonen's Lancia went off the side of the road at a tight left corner with no guardrail. The car plunged down a ravine and crashed on its roof. The aluminium fuel tank underneath the driver's seat was ruptured by the trees and exploded. The fuel tank was not protected by a skid plate, an item used mainly on gravel rallies, which was not fitted for the all-asphalt Tour de Corse. The explosion happened within seconds of the crash, and Toivonen and his co-driver, Sergio Cresto would not have had time to get out if they were still alive. The fire caused by the explosion was so intense that the Delta S4, built of fast-burning kevlar-reinforced plastic composite, was unidentifiable as a car afterwards. Both Toivonen and Cresto died in their seats. Toivonen left behind wife Erja (married in 1982) and two young children, son Markus and daughter Arla, while Cresto was single with no children.

Toivonen's crash remains a mystery because it had no close witnesses. Although it was caught on tape by a spectator further down the stage, it proved to be impossible to determine the cause of the crash from the footage. No race marshalls were close to the scene to notice the black smoke and no-one at the race finish knew about the crash. Toivonen's team only started to fear something might have happened after he failed to arrive from the stage on schedule. The next rally crew through the stage then mentioned they had seen some black smoke. By the time the emergency vehicles arrived on the crash scene, they could only put down the flames, which had been fanned by breezes. Lancia engineers and technicians could not determine the cause of the crash because the remains of the car were so charred.

Walter Röhrl later confirmed that Toivonen was taking medicine for his flu. In a later interview with Motorsport News, fellow driver Malcolm Wilson claimed that since the neck injuries sustained in his 1985 Costa Smeralda crash, Toivonen had suffered from random blackouts but did not tell his team because he did not want to lose his place at Lancia. At least one person who attended the aftermath of the crash reported that there were no skid marks on the tarmac, fuelling speculation that Toivonen could have suddenly lost consciousness at the wheel, but the cause of the crash is still unknown.

=== Aftermath ===
Within hours of Toivonen's crash, Jean-Marie Balestre and the FISA decided to ban Group B cars from competing in the 1987 season. The planned Group S was also cancelled and manufacturers were stuck with cars they could not race. Audi and Ford withdrew from Group B racing immediately, but other teams competed until the end of the season. The Tour de Corse continued the next day and Bruno Saby won with his Peugeot 205 Turbo 16 E2. Prior to Santos' and Toivonen's crashes, many commentators and drivers had warned of accidents resulting from drivers simply being unable to control their powerful cars. FISA was criticised for recognising the problem too late.

An FISA investigation later proved that drivers' reactions were too slow to keep up with the speed of the Group B cars, and drivers' eyes could not adjust their focus between the fast corners, resulting in tunnel vision. However, due to the high speed of the cars, rallying was more popular among spectators than ever. FISA had to face criticism also for overreacting to Toivonen's accident. John Davenport, author and former rally co-driver, stated in 2004 that "Group B could have been tamed. They were only unsafe in so much as the fuel system, which caused Toivonen's death, and the crowd control needed changing – it wasn't the actual cars." Group B cars have been described as "too fast to race."

== Legacy ==
Toivonen was known as a competitive driver both on loose (gravel, dirt, sand, snow and ice) and tarmac surfaces, and he found it difficult to choose between circuit racing and rallying. After becoming a rally driver, he still competed in some circuit racing events, successfully in a European Endurance Championship event and also in a few races for Eddie Jordan's British Formula Three Championship team. Jordan called Toivonen's performances "incredible" and compared him to Ayrton Senna, whom Toivonen had raced against while in Formula Three. After Toivonen's death, Jordan weighed in on his chances in Formula One:

I don't know if he would have become a champion in Formula One. It always takes a lot of luck, and now [after the accident] one can doubt if he would have been granted that. But he would have won Grands Prix – of that I'm absolutely sure.

During his World Rally Championship career, Toivonen competed in 40 world rallies, gathering three wins, nine podium places, 185 stage wins and retiring 22 times. With only wins and retirements in the last five of his rallies, he was at the peak of his career in the Lancia Delta S4, after finally finding a car that was both competitive and suitable for his driving style. However, Toivonen admitted having problems with the car: "I may have won the RAC Rally with Lancia, but I just did not know how to drive it. It seemed to have a mind of its own." Lancia team boss Cesare Fiorio later claimed that Toivonen was the only driver who could really control the Delta S4. Toivonen often complained about the S4 during TV interviews, often saying the car was difficult to drive- particularly on tarmac- where more power could be put down, therefore making the car faster in such conditions.

In a Henri Toivonen obituary, titled Rebel With a Cause, published in Motor five days after Toivonen's fatal accident, rally author Martin Holmes named him a "rebel driver", and proof that young drivers can be successful in rallying, a sport which had previously been dominated by older, more experienced drivers such as fellow Finn Hannu Mikkola, Swede Stig Blomqvist and German Walter Röhrl. However, Toivonen could not achieve the necessary level of consistency to avoid a number of high speed accidents. Prior to the introduction of the Delta S4, he was known for his ability to make up large amounts of time in single stages. This led to a number of stage wins but also to several bad accidents resulting from driving mistakes. Toivonen's career almost ended in early 1985, when he was nearly paralysed in the Rally Costa Smeralda accident – 1985 would have been his first full WRC season, excluding the extremely arduous endurance events in Africa- the Safari Rally and the Ivory Coast Rally for which he was never entered in his career- in fact, Toivonen never did a single rally outside Europe- not even the Safari Rally, which was considered one of the most prestigious rally events up until 2002, when it was taken off the WRC calendar. The World Rally Archive's Hall of Fame now names him an "icon for the one of the most controversial periods of rallying."

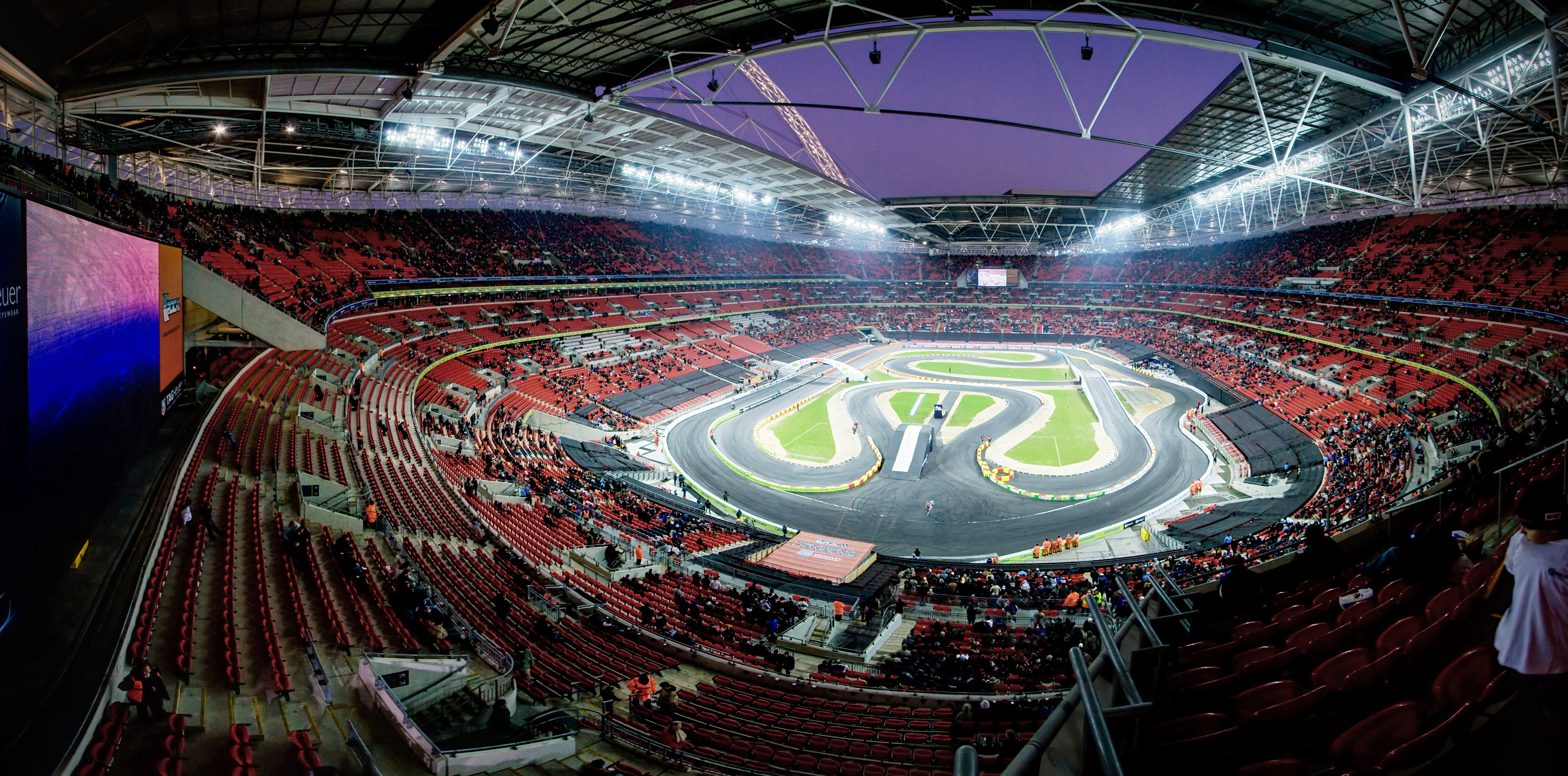
2007 Race of Champions at Wembley Stadium.

Toivonen was buried in Espoo, where his family moved from Jyväskylä when Toivonen was still very young. In Corsica, a marble slab dedicated to him and Sergio Cresto was placed at the curve where Toivonen drove out. The memorial place always has an unopened bottle of Martini, which is a reference to Toivonen's Martini-sponsored Lancia factory team. As of 2006, a local resident puts new flowers by the slab every day. In July, the Rally Marca Trevigiana in Italy was titled "Memorial Henri Toivonen" in honour of Toivonen. The rally was stopped after a fatal accident on the fourth stage. In 1988, former rally driver and arguably the most successful female race car driver in history, Michèle Mouton, organised the first Race of Champions to commemorate Toivonen's death. The Race of Champions was originally restricted to rally drivers, but became even more popular with the introduction of Formula One and NASCAR stars. The Henri Toivonen Memorial Trophy is still awarded to the winner of the individual event every year.

Another trophy bearing Toivonen's name was the Henri Toivonen Grand Attack Trophy, which was awarded by Peugeot's Rally Challenge, organised by Des O'Dell, "to the driver who most embodied the spirit shown by the young Finn." In 2006, Toivonen was honoured at the Neste Oil Rally Finland. An exhibition in memory of him was opened on 17 August in the Rally HQ Jyväskylä Paviljonki. The interviewing event was attended by his former teammate Markku Alén, former co-driver Juha Piironen, current Ford factory team boss Malcolm Wilson and his brother Harri Toivonen. Harri Toivonen quit his racing career in 2002, ending the 40-year racing history of the Toivonen family.

== Complete WRC results ==
Year	Entrant	Car	1	2	3	4	5	6	7	8	9	10	11	12	13	WDC	Points
1975	Henri Toivonen	Simca Rallye 2	MON	SWE	KEN	GRC	MAR	POR	FIN; Ret	ITA	FRA	GBR				N/A^{[A]}	0
1977	Henri Toivonen	Chrysler Avenger	MON	SWE	POR	KEN	NZL	GRC	FIN; 5	ITA	CAN	FRA	GBR			-^{[B]}	0
1978	Henri Toivonen	Citroën CX 2400	MON	SWE	KEN	POR; Ret	GRC; Ret		CAN	ITA	CIV	FRA				-^{[B]}	0
1978	Henri Toivonen	Porsche 911						FIN; Ret								-^{[B]}	0
1978	Henri Toivonen	Chrysler Sunbeam											GBR; 9			-^{[B]}	0
1979	Henri Toivonen	Fiat 131 Abarth	MON	SWE	POR	KEN	GRC	NZL	FIN; Ret	CAN	ITA	FRA		CIV		–	0
1979	Toyota Oil	Ford Escort RS1800											GBR; Ret			–	0
1980	Talbot Cars GB	Talbot Sunbeam Lotus	MON	SWE	POR; Ret	KEN	GRC	ARG		NZL	ITA; 5	FRA	GBR; 1	CIV		10th	28
1980	Talbot Motor Co	Talbot Sunbeam Lotus							FIN; Ret							10th	28
1981	Talbot	Talbot Sunbeam Lotus	MON; 5	SWE	POR; 2	KEN	FRA; Ret	GRC; Ret	ARG	BRA	FIN; Ret	ITA; 2	CIV	GBR; Ret		7th	38
1982	Rothmans Opel Rally Team	Opel Ascona 400	MON	SWE	POR; Ret	KEN	FRA	GRC; 3	NZL	BRA	FIN; Ret	ITA; 5	CIV	GBR; 3		7th	32
1983	Rothmans Opel Rally Team	Opel Ascona 400	MON; 6	SWE	POR	KEN	FRA									14th	16
1983	Rothmans Opel Rally Team	Opel Manta 400						GRC; Ret	NZL	ARG	FIN; Ret	ITA; 4	CIV	GBR; Ret		14th	16
1984	Martini Lancia	Lancia 037 Rally	MON	SWE	POR; Ret	KEN	FRA	GRC; Ret	NZL	ARG	FIN; 3	ITA	CIV	GBR		16th	12
1985	Martini Lancia	Lancia 037 Rally	MON; 6	SWE	POR	KEN	FRA	GRC	NZL	ARG	FIN; 4	ITA; 3	CIV			6th	48
1985	Martini Lancia	Lancia Delta S4												GBR; 1		6th	48
1986	Martini Lancia	Lancia Delta S4	MON; 1	SWE; Ret	POR; WD	KEN	FRA; Ret	GRC	NZL	ARG	FIN	CIV	ITA	GBR	USA	13th	20

=== Notes ===
^{A} From the World Rally Championship's conception in 1973 until 1976, there was no championship for drivers. Only a manufacturers' championship was awarded.
^{B} For the 1977 and 1978 seasons, the FIA Cup for Drivers was awarded. This took into account all of the WRC events, plus 10 events that were not part of the WRC.

Records
Preceded by Markku Alén; 24 years, 256 days (1975 Rallye de Portugal)	Youngest rally winner 24 years, 86 days (1980 RAC Rally)	Succeeded by Jari-Matti Latvala; 22 years, 313 days (2008 Swedish Rally)
