= FIA European Rally Trophy =

The FIA European Rally Trophy, ERT is a European rally competition.

The ERT was made up of competitors from seven regions, which were the Alpine Rally Trophy, the Balkan Rally Trophy, the Baltic Rally Trophy, the Benelux Rally Trophy, the Celtic Rally Trophy, the Central Rally Trophy and the Iberian Rally Trophy. The top five competitors in each class from the seven regions were eligible to enter the European Rally Trophy final.

For 2023 season ERT was restructured to a combined schedule.

== History ==
The ERT evolved from European Rally Cup, which ran in 2012–2013. In 2012 European Rally Cup ran in 3 regions: South, East and Central. For the 2013 edition European Rally Cup ran as a single tournament made up of 17 rounds.

=== 2014 ===
The first competition of ERT was won by the Bulgarian Krum Donchev, he had won both his home events and defeated Oleksandr Saliuk, Jr. who was only present at three events. The competition format was single championship made up of 13 rounds.

=== 2015 ===
The Turkish ex-JWRC driver scored five wins in five starts to become 2015 champion, driving both R5 and S2000. His rival and runner up was the Emirati Rashid Al-Ketbi, remained winless but had three podium finishes. Third was Slovenian driver Rok Turk who won twice in 2015. The competition format was single championship made up of 14 rounds.

=== 2016 ===
The competition format gained a new shape from 2016 onwards. The tournament consisted of 3 regional ERT championships - Balkan, Baltic, Celtic, Central and Iberian. The top 5 each championship drivers qualified to the final race, which in 2016 was selected to be International Rally Waldviertel (de:Rallye Waldviertel).

=== 2017 ===
The new format proved to be successful, with two more regional ERT championships added - Alpine and Benelux. The final race took place in Rallye Casinos do Algarve.

=== 2018 ===
The last year's format was repeated, including the final race in Rallye Casinos do Algarve.

=== 2019 ===
Same seven regional ERT championships took place, with the final taking place at Rallye International du Valais on 16–19 October.

=== 2020 ===
Seven regional ERT championships were scheduled to take place, with the Alpine Rally Trophy renamed as the Alps Rally Trophy. However the COVID-19 pandemic caused most rounds to be cancelled. The ERT Final took place at the International ADMV Lausitz Rallye (de:Boxberg/O.L.#Lausitz-Rallye).

=== 2021 ===
A Scandinavian Rally Trophy was scheduled to be added, but the three rounds were cancelled. The ERT Final was held at the Internationale ADMV Lausitz Rallye.

=== 2022 ===
The Baltic and Benelux trophies were dropped, therefore the six regional trophies were Alps, Balkan, Celtic, Central, Iberian and Scandinavian. The ERT Final was held at the Internationale ADMV Lausitz Rallye.

=== 2023 ===
For 2023 ERT was restructured such that competitors may nominate six best scores without upper limit on how many rallies they take part in.

== Past winners ==
Year	Driver	Co-Driver	Car	Rally Final
2024	(Slovenia) Kysucký Martin	(Slovenia) Štindl Vladimír	Peugeot 208 Rally4, Ford Fiesta Rally 4	
2023	(Czech Republic) René Dohnal	(Czech Republic) Roman Švec	Peugeot 208 Rally4	18 round championship
2022	(Sweden) Tom Kristensson	(Sweden) Andreas Johansson	Hyundai i20 R5	(Germany) Intl. ADMV Lausitz Rallye
2021	(Turkey) Mustafa Çakal	(Turkey) Özgür Akdağ	Hyundai i20 R5	(Germany) Intl. ADMV Lausitz Rallye
2020	(Czech Republic) Ondřej Bisaha	(Czech Republic) Petr Těšínský	Hyundai i20 R5	(Germany) Intl. ADMV Lausitz Rallye
2019	(Czech Republic) Ondřej Bisaha	(Czech Republic) Petr Těšínský	Hyundai i20 R5	(Switzerland) Rallye International du Valais
2018	(Portugal) Alexandre Camacho	(Portugal) Rui Rodrigues	Škoda Fabia R5	(Portugal) Rallye Casinos do Algarve
2017	(Turkey) Yagiz Avci	(Turkey) Bahadir Gücenmez	Škoda Fabia R5	(Portugal) Rallye Casinos do Algarve
2016	(United Arab Emirates) Rashid Al-Ketbi	(Italy) Giovanni Bernacchini	Ford Fiesta R5	(Austria) Intl. Rallye Waldviertel
2015	(Turkey) Murat Bostanci	(Turkey) Onur Vatansever	Ford Fiesta R5	14 round championship
2014	(Bulgaria) Krum Donchev	(Bulgaria) Petar Yordanov	Ford Fiesta R5	13 round championship

== See also ==
- List of FIA championships
- European Rally Championship
