= Carlo Capone =

Italian rally driver

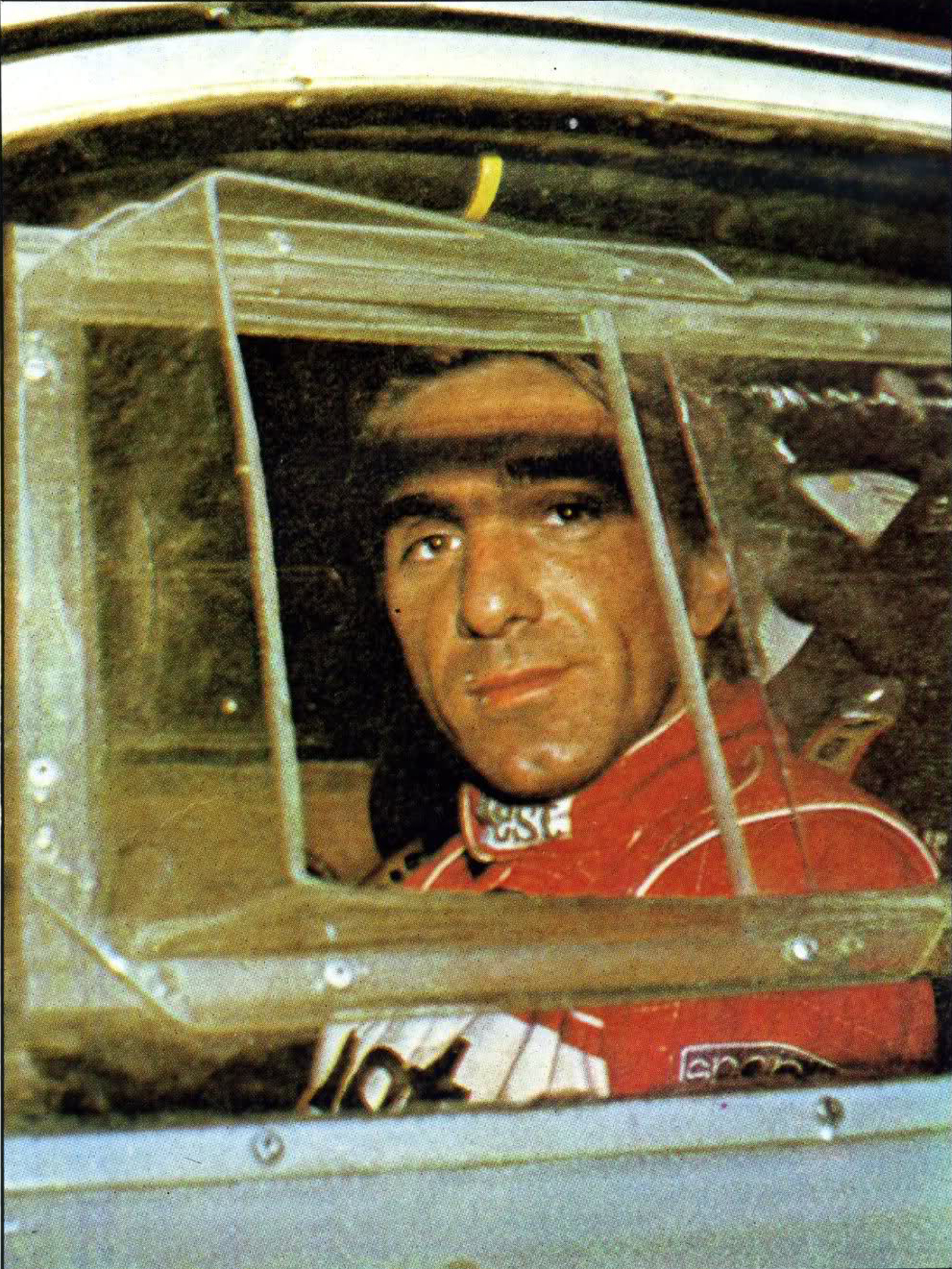
A photo of the 80s rally driver, Carlo Capone.

Carlo Capone (born 12 April 1957), is a former Italian rally driver. He claimed the European Rally Championship in 1984 with a Lancia 037 in front of the late Henri Toivonen in a Porsche 911. His life inspired the character of Loris De Martino, played by Stefano Accorsi, in the 2016 movie Italian Race.

Sporting positions
Preceded by Miki Biasion	European Rally Champion; 1984	Succeeded by Dario Cerrato
