= Bensing =

Bensing is a surname. Notable people with the surname include:

- Heinrich Bensing (1911–1955), German opera singer
- Jozien Bensing (1950–2026), Dutch clinical psychologist and academic

== See also ==
- Bensinger, a surname
