= Bensinger =

Bensinger is a surname. Notable people with the surname include:

- Amalie Bensinger (1809–1889), German painter
- Graham Bensinger (born 1986), American television sports reporter
- Jörg Bensinger, German engineer
- Peter B. Bensinger (1936–2025), American government official
- Richard Bensinger, American author, labor activist and labor consultant
- Tyler Bensinger, American film and television writer, producer and film director
- William Bensinger (1840–1918), American soldier

== See also ==
- Bensing, a surname
