= Audi quattro concept =

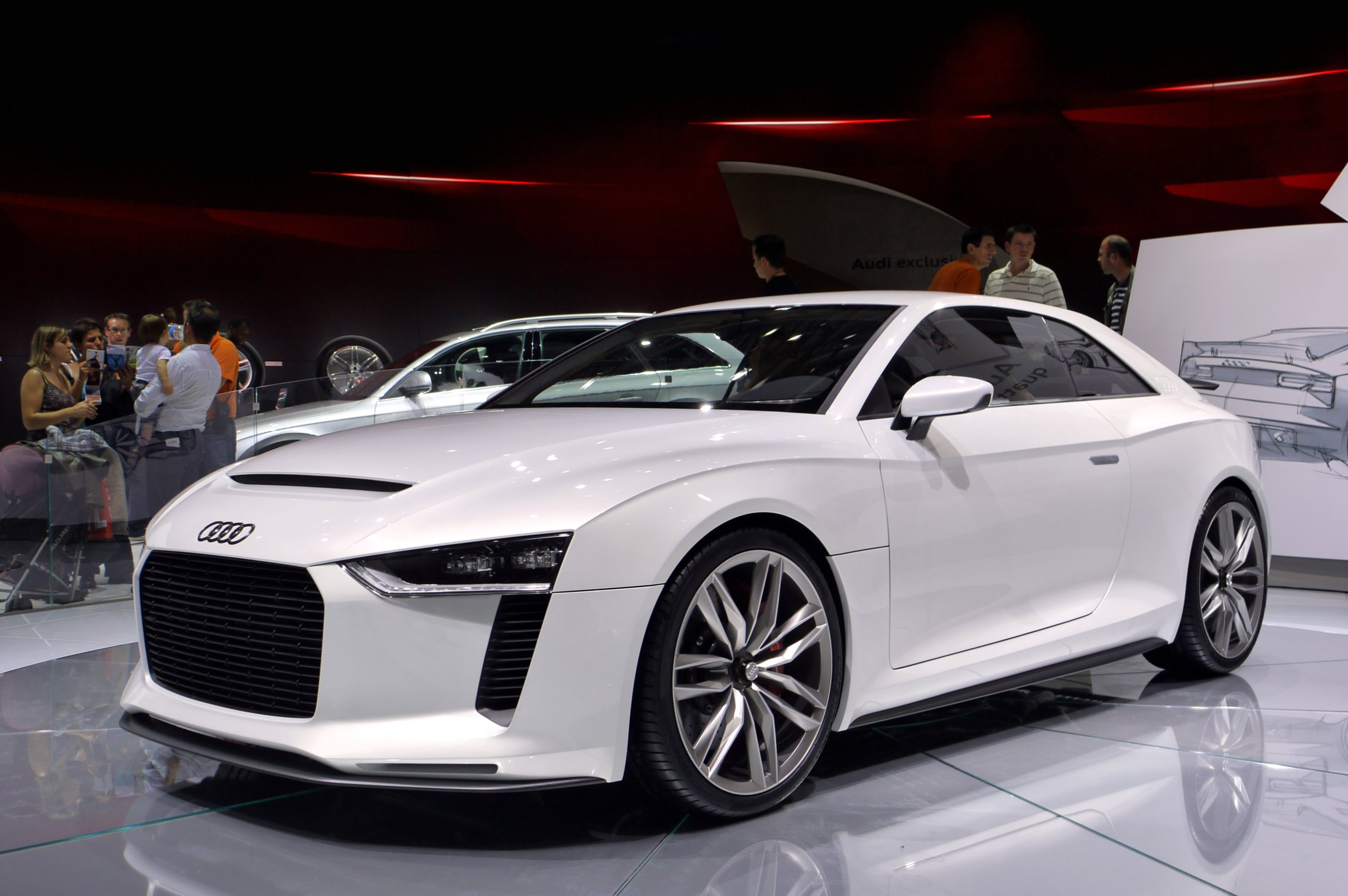

Overview
- Manufacturer: Audi
- Production: Concept car

Body and chassis
- Class: Compact luxury car Sports coupe
- Body style: 2-door coupé
- Layout: longitudinal front engine, quattro permanent four-wheel drive
- Platform: Volkswagen Group MLB platform

Powertrain
- Engine: 2.5l TFSI 402.8 hp (300 kW)
- Transmission: 6-Speed Manual sourced from Audi S5

Dimensions
- Wheelbase: 2,600 mm (102.4 in)
- Length: 4,280 mm (168.5 in)
- Width: 1,860 mm (73.2 in)
- Height: 1,320 mm (52.0 in)
- Curb weight: 1,300 kg (2,866.0 lb)

The Audi quattro concept is a concept car produced by Audi and presented at the Paris Motor Show in 2010. It commemorates the 30th anniversary of the original Audi Quattro and the Audi quattro four wheel drive system. Based on the Audi RS5, it features a modified 2.5L five-cylinder TFSI engine and the sixth generation of quattro transmission. It had been reported that Audi were considering a limited production model (200–500 cars) based on the quattro concept, but the project was shelved in 2012.

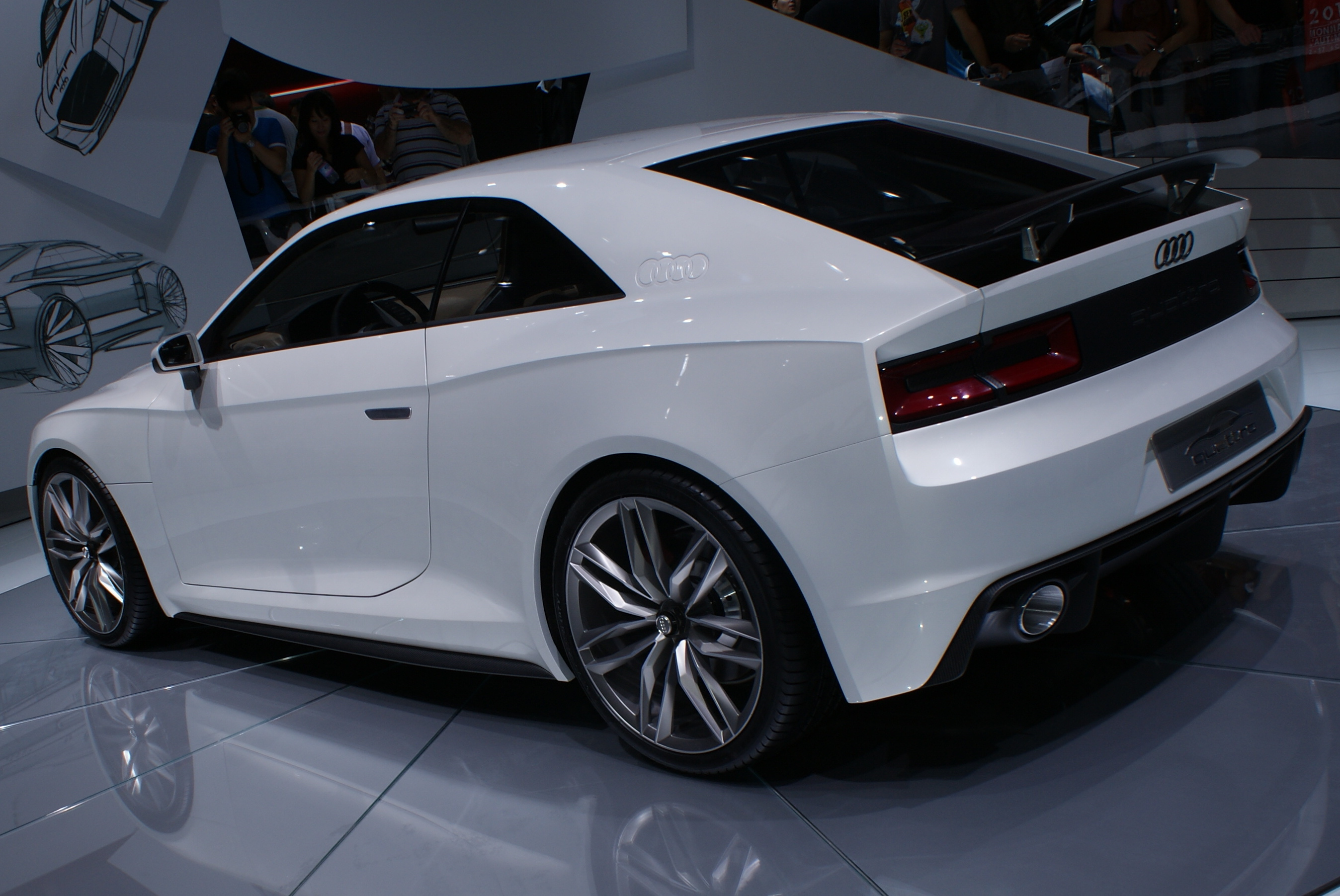
Rear view

Elements of the concept's design language found their way into the production versions of both the third generation Audi TT and the second generation Audi R8. The concept's integrated infotainment and instrument cluster display was also realized in production Audi models as the virtual cockpit system, starting with the third generation Audi TT in 2014.

== Engine and transmission ==
The car is powered by a turbocharged (TFSI) five cylinder 2.5 L engine producing 408 PS (300 kW). It has a six-speed manual gearbox and a new generation of the quattro permanent four wheel drive system. It was estimated to do 0-60 mph in 3.8 seconds with a top speed limited to 155 mph, and Audi claimed the engine was capable of 27.6 US mpg.

== Body and chassis ==
Based on the platform of the Audi RS5, with the wheelbase shortened by 150 mm, the styling is a reinterpretation of the short-wheelbase Audi Sport Quattro. The body is constructed in aluminium using Audi Space Frame technology, and additional carbon fibre components.

The car's total weight is 1,300 kg (2,866 lb), which makes for a power-to-weight ratio of 3,2 kilograms per horsepower (7.02 lb/hp).

== Interior ==
The navigation system and infotainment, which is usually placed in the center of the dashboard, has been merged with the gauge cluster placed behind the steering wheel, making the controls of the car within arm's reach. The screen can display media and nav controls and the usual speedometer at the same time. The buttons on the infotainment system have been placed around the gauge screen and on the steering wheel for convenience. The main interior colors are beige and black, with silver trim here and there. There are two racing-style bucket seats in the car, with the rest of the rear interior space used for cargo.
