= Audi Quattro =

Car model

Audi Quattro B2 (85)
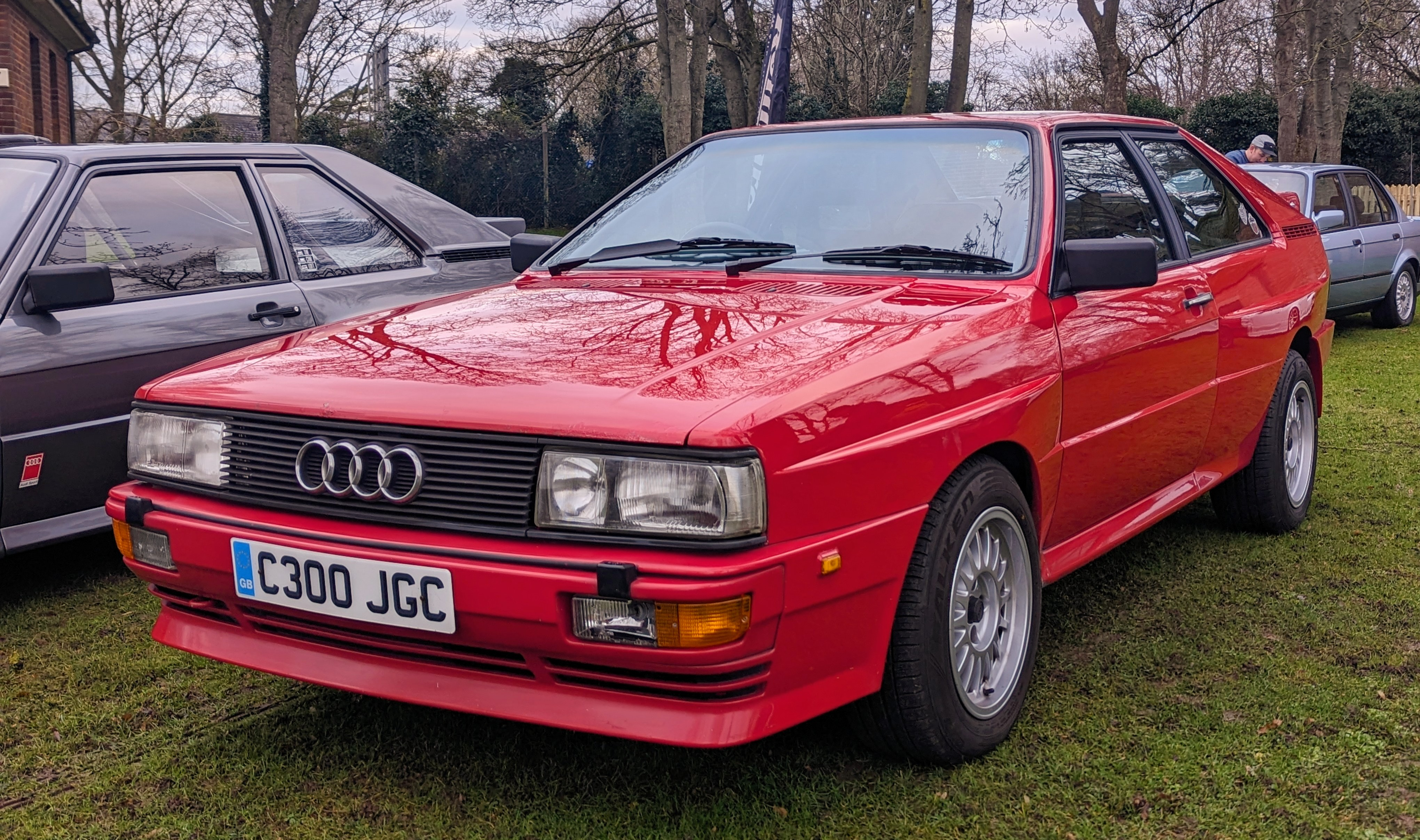

Overview
- Manufacturer: Audi AG
- Also called: Ur-Quattro
- Production: 1980–1991; 11,452 produced
- Assembly: Germany: Ingolstadt
- Designer: Jörg Bensinger; Walter Treser; Ferdinand Piëch; Franz Tengler (transmission); Martin Smith (exterior styling)

Body and chassis
- Class: Mid-size car, rally car
- Body style: 2-door coupé
- Layout: longitudinal front engine, all-wheel drive
- Platform: Volkswagen B2
- Related: Audi 80 (B2), Audi Coupé (B2)

Powertrain
- Engine: 2.1 L SOHC 10v I5 (turbo) (1980–1987); 2.2 L SOHC 10v I5 (turbo) (1987–1989); 2.2 L DOHC 20v I5 (turbo) (1989–1991)
- Transmission: 5-speed manual

Dimensions
- Wheelbase: 2,524 mm (99.4 in)
- Length: 4,404 mm (173.4 in)
- Width: 1,722 mm (67.8 in)
- Height: 1,346 mm (53.0 in)
- Kerb weight: 1,290–1,350 kg (2,844–2,976 lb)

Chronology
- Predecessor: Audi 100 Coupé S
- Successor: Audi S2

The Audi Quattro is a road and rally car, produced by the German automobile manufacturer Audi, part of the Volkswagen Group. It was first shown at the 1980 Geneva Motor Show on 3 March. Production continued until 1991.

== Background ==
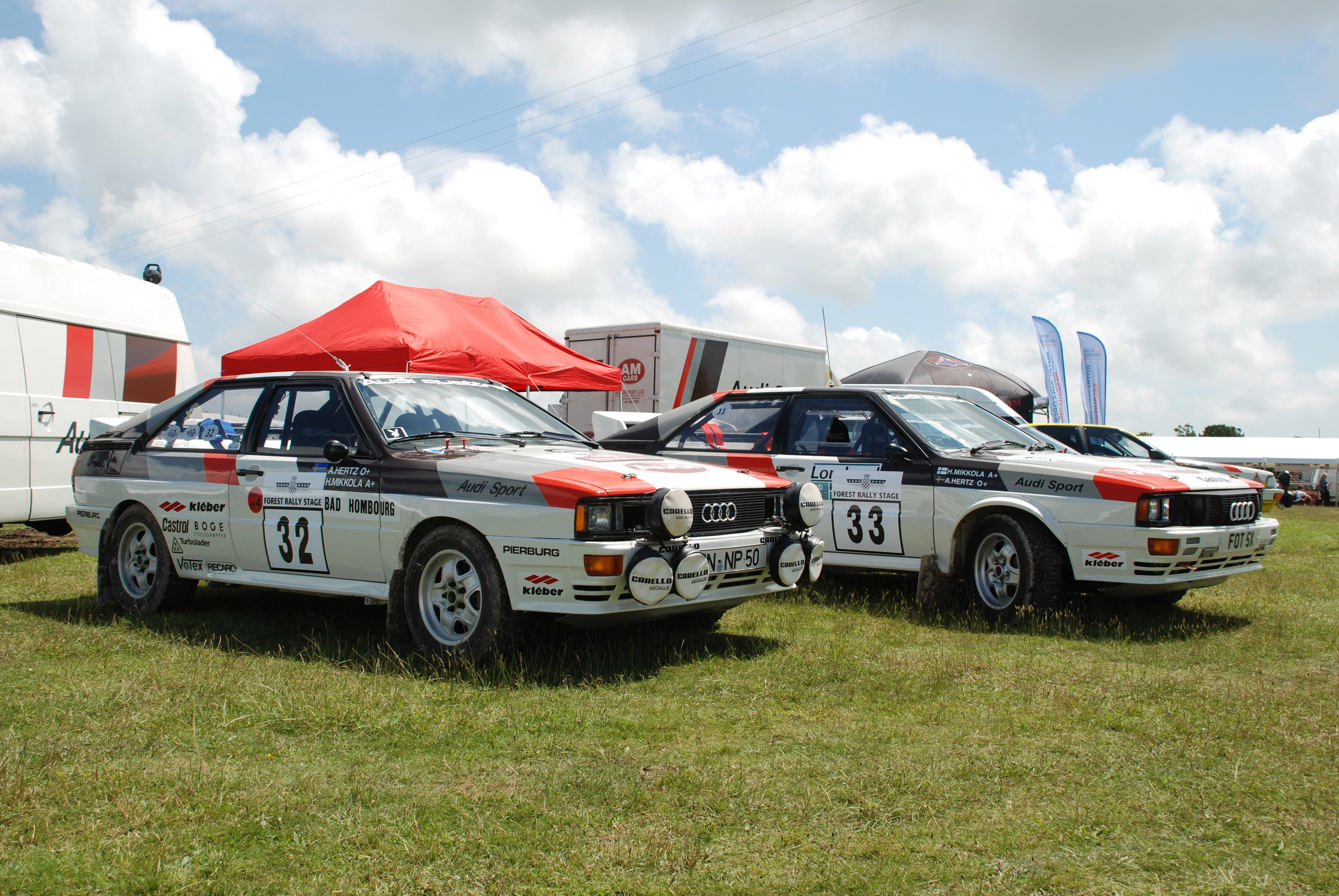
Audi Quattro's Group 4. Earlier car in front, later variant with wheel arch extensions in the back

The model name quattro is derived from the Italian word for "four" to convey the idea that power is delivered to four wheels. Audi has also used the name to refer to the quattro four-wheel-drive system, or any four-wheel-drive version of an Audi model. The original Quattro model is also commonly referred to as the Ur-Quattro - the "Ur-" (German for "primordial", "original", or "first of its kind") is an augmentative prefix. The idea of such a car came from the Audi engineer Jörg Bensinger.

The Audi Quattro was the first rally car to take advantage of the then-recently changed rules that allowed the use of four-wheel drive in competition racing. It won consecutive competitions for the next two years. To commemorate the success of the original vehicle, all subsequent Audi production automobiles with this four-wheel-drive system were badged with the trademark quattro with a lower-case "q" letter.

The Audi Quattro shared many parts and platform with the Coupé version of the Audi 80 (B2). The quattro was internally designated Typ 85, a production code it shared with the quattro versions of the Audi Coupé. Its characteristic flared wheel arches were styled by Martin Smith. The Audi Quattro also had independent front and rear suspension.

== Production history ==
The idea for a high-performance four-wheel-drive car was proposed in 1977 by Audi's chassis engineer, Jörg Bensinger, after he found that the Volkswagen Iltis military vehicle outperformed other vehicles in tests involving snow. An Audi 80 variant was developed in co-operation with Walter Treser, Director of Pre-Development.

=== European market ===
Audi introduced the original Quattro to European customers in late 1980, featuring Audi's quattro permanent four-wheel drive system, and the first to mate the front-engine, four-wheel-drive layout with a turbocharged engine.

The original engine was the 2,144 cc (2.1 L), longitudinally-mounted inline-5-cylinder 10 valve SOHC, with a turbocharger and intercooler. It generated 147 kW (200 PS; 197 hp) and torque of 285 N⋅m (210 lbf⋅ft) at 3,500 rpm, propelling the Quattro from 0 to 100 km/h (62 mph) in 7.1 seconds, and on to a top speed of over 220 km/h (137 mph).

The displacement of the engine was dropped slightly from 2144 cc to 2133 cc with a bore x stroke of 79.3 mm × 86.4 mm (3.1 in × 3.4 in) for the Rally car so that Audi could satisfy the 3-litre rallying class with a 1.4 times multiplication factor. Valvetrain was DOHC 4 valves per cylinder (20 valves in total) with an oil-cooled KKK K27 turbocharger at 1.03 bars (14.9 psi) and Air-to-Air - Längerer & Reich intercooler fed by Bosch LH-Jetronic fuel injection, generating 225 kW (306 PS; 302 hp) at 6,700 rpm and 350 N⋅m (258 lbf⋅ft) of torque at 3,700 rpm.

The engine was eventually modified to a 2,226 cc (136 cu in) inline-5 with 10 valves, still generating 147 kW (200 PS; 197 hp), but with peak torque lower in the rev-range. In 1989, it was then changed to a 2,226 cc (136 cu in) inline-five 20-valve DOHC setup generating 162 kW (220 PS; 217 hp), now with a top speed of 230 km/h (143 mph).

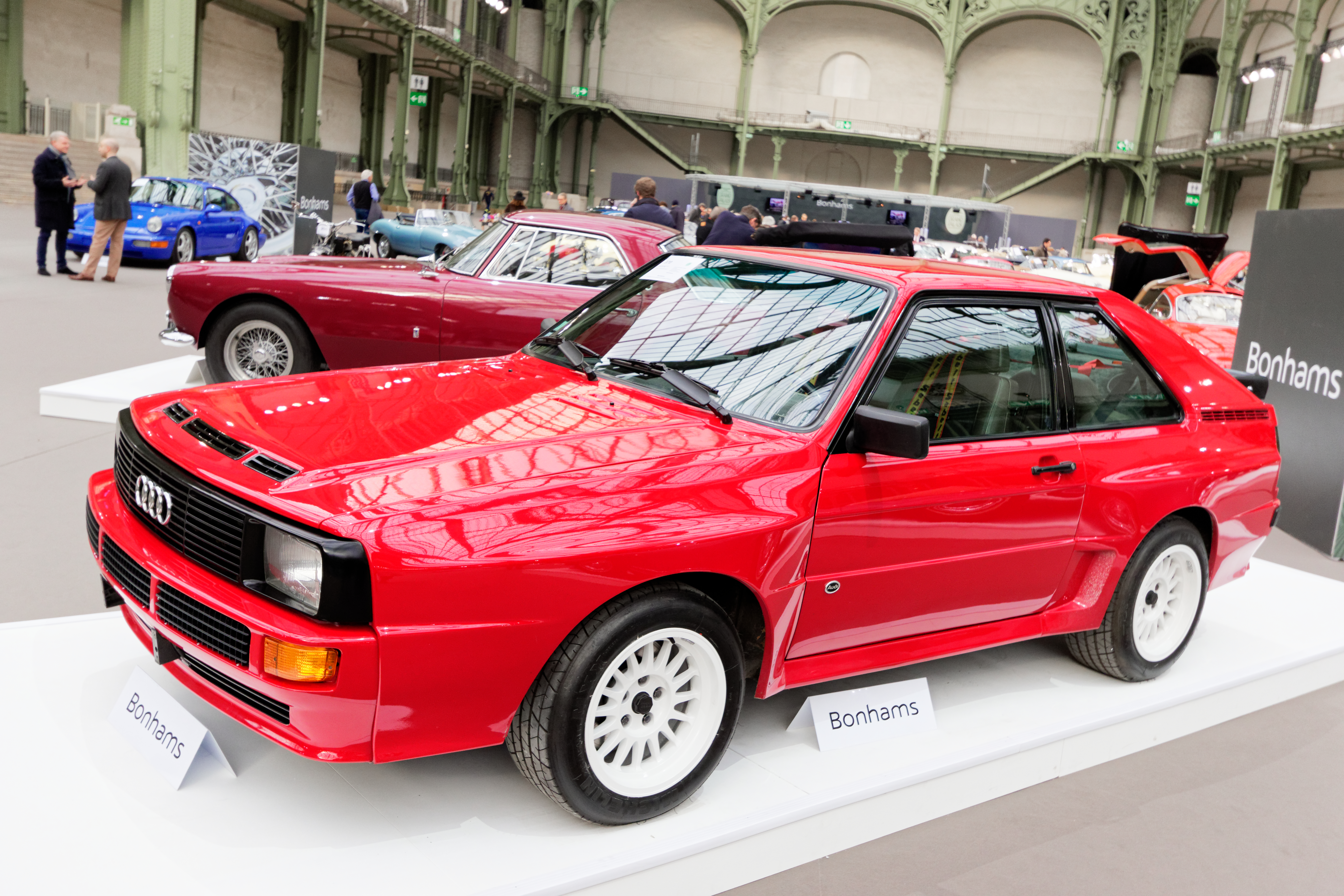
1985 Audi Sport Quattro

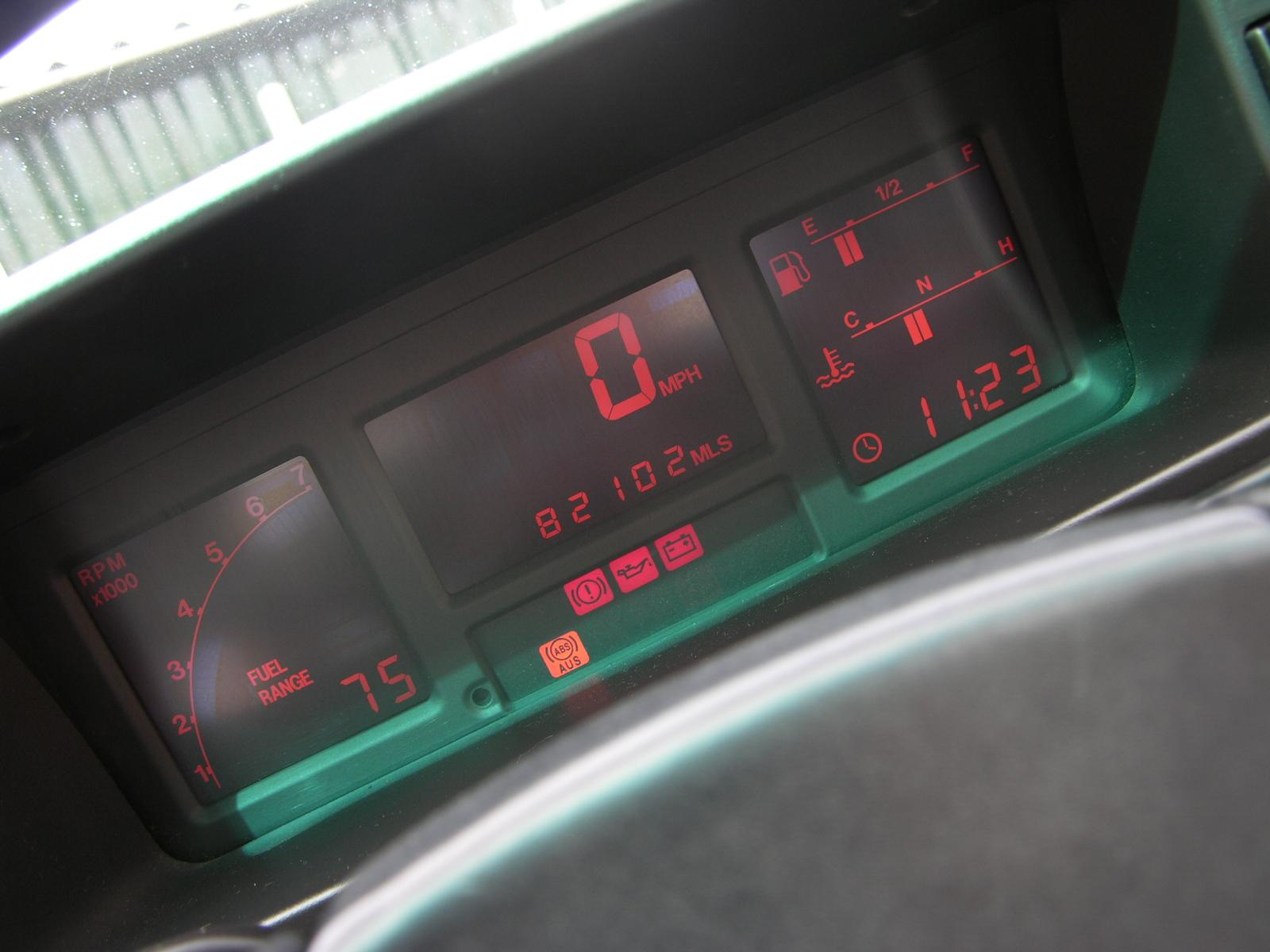
Audi Quattro LCD instrument cluster

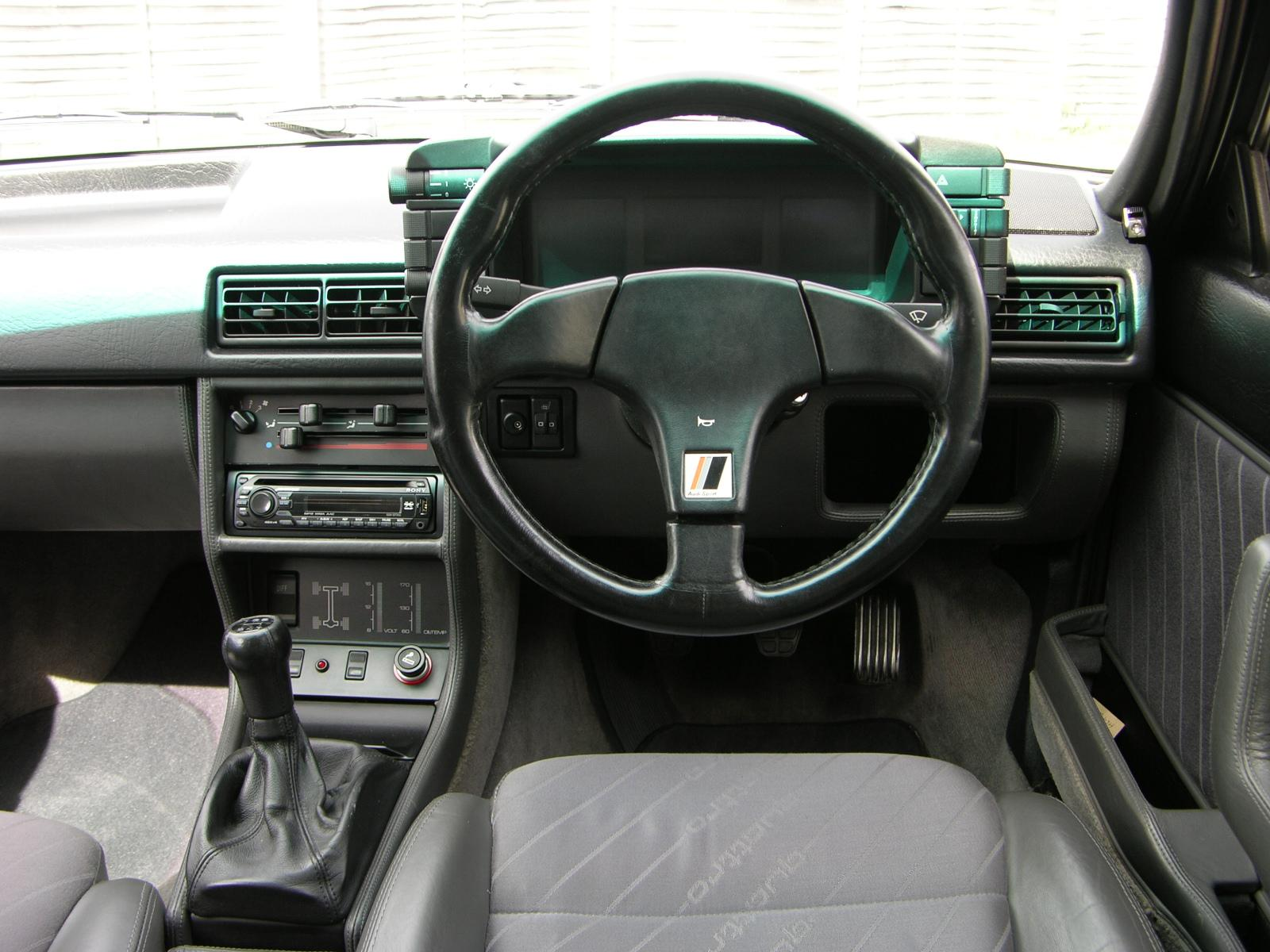
1990 Audi Quattro interior

The Quattro was partially hand-built on a dedicated line. Production totaled 11,452 units from 1980 to 1991, and through this eleven-year production, there were no major changes in the visual design of the car. For the 1983 model year, the dashboard did away with an analogue instrument cluster was now fitted with a green digital liquid crystal display (LCD) electronic instrument cluster. This was later changed in 1988 to an orange LCD electronic instrument cluster. The interior was redesigned in 1984 and featured a new dashboard layout, steering wheel, and center console. The switches around the instrument panel were also redesigned. In 1985, the dashboard changed slightly to a harder foam and lost its diagonal stripe. The switches were slightly varied, and the diff lock pull knob gave way to a two-position turn knob with digital readouts for voltage and oil temperature.

1987 MB-engined Audi Quattro

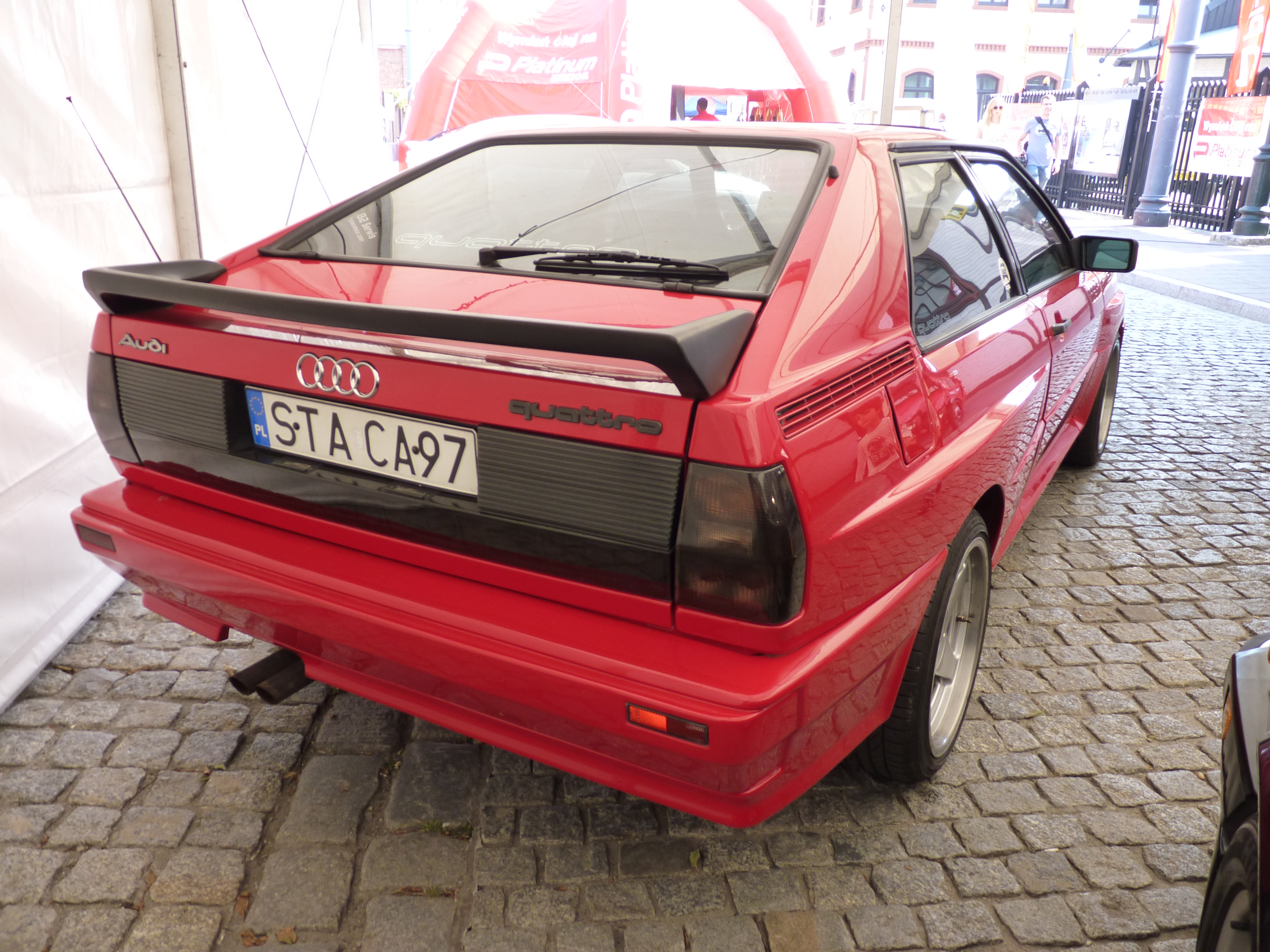
Audi Quattro rear view

Exterior styling received little modification during the Quattro's production run. Originally, the car had a flat front grille featuring four separate headlamp lenses, one for each low- and high-beam unit. This was altered for the 1983 model year with combined units featuring a single lens housing twin reflectors. This was changed again, for the 1985 model year, in what has become known as the 'facelift model' and included such alterations as a new sloping front grille, headlights, and trim and badging changes. The 20V RR Quattro also featured a new three-spoke steering wheel design, leather trim for door armrests, gloveboxes, center console, and door pockets. There was also a full-length leather-wrapped center console all the way to the rear seats and 'quattro' script on the interior with partial leather seats. The floor on the driver's side bulged due to the dual catalytic exhaust setup. The different models may be distinguished by the emblems on their boot lids: the WR had a vinyl 'quattro' decal or a brushed aluminum effect plastic emblem, the MB had chrome-plated 'Audi', 'Audi rings', and 'quattro' emblems. In contrast, the RR had only chrome-plated 'Audi rings'.

The rear suspension was altered early on with geometry changes and the removal of the rear anti-roll bar to reduce the tendency toward lift-off oversteer. For the 1984 facelift, the wheel size went from 6x15-inch with 205/60-15 tyres to 8x15-inch wheels with 215/50-15 Pirelli Cinturato P5 tyres. The suspension was lowered by 20 mm with slightly stiffer springs. For 1987, the Torsen centre differential was used for the first time, replacing the manual centre differential lock.

The final original Audi Quattro was produced on 17 May 1991, two years after the first models of the new Audi Coupé (8B) range (based on the 1986 Audi 80) had been introduced.

=== U.S. and Canadian markets ===
Sales of the Quattro in the U.S. and Canada began in the 1983 model year. They entered the all-wheel-drive market established by the AMC Eagle, the first full-time automatic all-wheel-drive line of passenger cars to reach mass production. The small Subaru Leone station wagon offered an optional part-time 4-wheel drive system in the U.S. market starting in 1975.

The North American Quattro was manufactured concurrently with, and of the same design as, their European 1982 model-year counterparts (it did not include the minor cosmetic changes of the 1983 European model) and continued through 1986. Total sales in the U.S. were 664 units. The Canadian-market cars were identical to the U.S. version, except for the speedometer, which was metric. Official sales figures for Canada totaled 99 units, including 61 sold in 1983, 17 in 1984, 18 in 1985, and 3 in 1986.

The U.S. and Canadian cars were equipped with larger impact bumpers with built-in shock absorbers, like the rest of the 4000/Coupé models. They did not have an anti-lock braking system (ABS) but did include air conditioning and leather upholstery. Most of the 1984 and 1985 Canadian models came without sunroofs. The remaining electric, suspension, and cosmetic updates were completed at the same time as those for the European cars.

The initial 2.1 L (2,144 cc, engine code "WX") engine for U.S. and Canadian models included minor component and engine control unit (ECU) changes, lowered turbocharger boost pressure, a different camshaft, as well as emission controls that consisted of a catalytic converter and fuel control giving a stoichiometric air-fuel ratio, lowering power output to 160 hp (119 kW; 162 PS). Other mechanical specifications were identical to those of the European market vehicles. The WX engine was also used in cars in the Swiss and Japanese markets. Audi built 200 special-edition cars in 1988 with the WX engine and an analog instrument cluster, with everything else identical to the MB model of that year.

== Press reviews ==
In May 1981, Autocar magazine road tested a left hand drive Quattro (registration number WBD 335W), one of the first magazines to do so since it was introduced. Beginning with a photograph in the magazine of a Quattro cornering hard on Pendine beach in South-west Wales, Autocar's Road Test Editor raved about the Quattro's "thrilling performance" being impressed with its traction and acceleration particularly on wet, greasy and slippery surfaces, noting that only the Porsche 911 could match its traction and acceleration in slippery conditions. After extensive driving across the mountain roads of Wales, the Road Test editor mentioned that while the 60/40 front/rear weight distribution can make the Quattro "tricky in extremis" under very hard cornering, the editor wrote that "When driven with respect, once you have learned its ways, the Quattro is nevertheless magnificent, particularly through a wet and deserted roundabout or series of open bends." The road test editor praised the interior's "comfortable refinement" and judged that its 1981 £14,500 price tag "is very good value for money considering its performance and the fact that its BMW, Porsche and Jaguar rivals cost £5000 more." (In summer 1981 both a Jaguar XJS V12 and BMW 6 Series Coupe on sale in the UK cost almost £20,000). Adding the caveat that in 1981 (and until summer 1983) the Quattro was only available in left hand drive in the UK, the Autocar Road Test concluded that the Quattro "is a vastly satisfying and enjoyable car to drive."

== Audi quattro Spyder Concept (1991) ==
The Audi quattro Spyder was a mid-engine coupé equipped with a 2.8-litre V6 engine taken from the Audi 100. The engine was rated at 174 PS (128 kW; 172 hp) and 181 lb⋅ft (245 N⋅m) of torque. The car was a rolling test bed for a future mid-engine sports car and featured a 5-speed manual gearbox, a modified version for the quattro four-wheel-drive system, aluminium body panels with a tubular steel space frame, 1,100 kg (2,425 lb) kerb weight and a suspension system with trapezoidal links. All of the unique features depicted in the concept car would find their way in future Audi production vehicles.

The car was production-ready and garnered a lot of acclaim from both the motoring press and prospective buyers but due to the economic downturn of the 1990s, Audi decided not to press ahead with the project as the demand would not outweigh the development costs for the model.

The concept car was unveiled at the 1991 Frankfurt Motor Show.

== Audi quattro concept (2010) ==
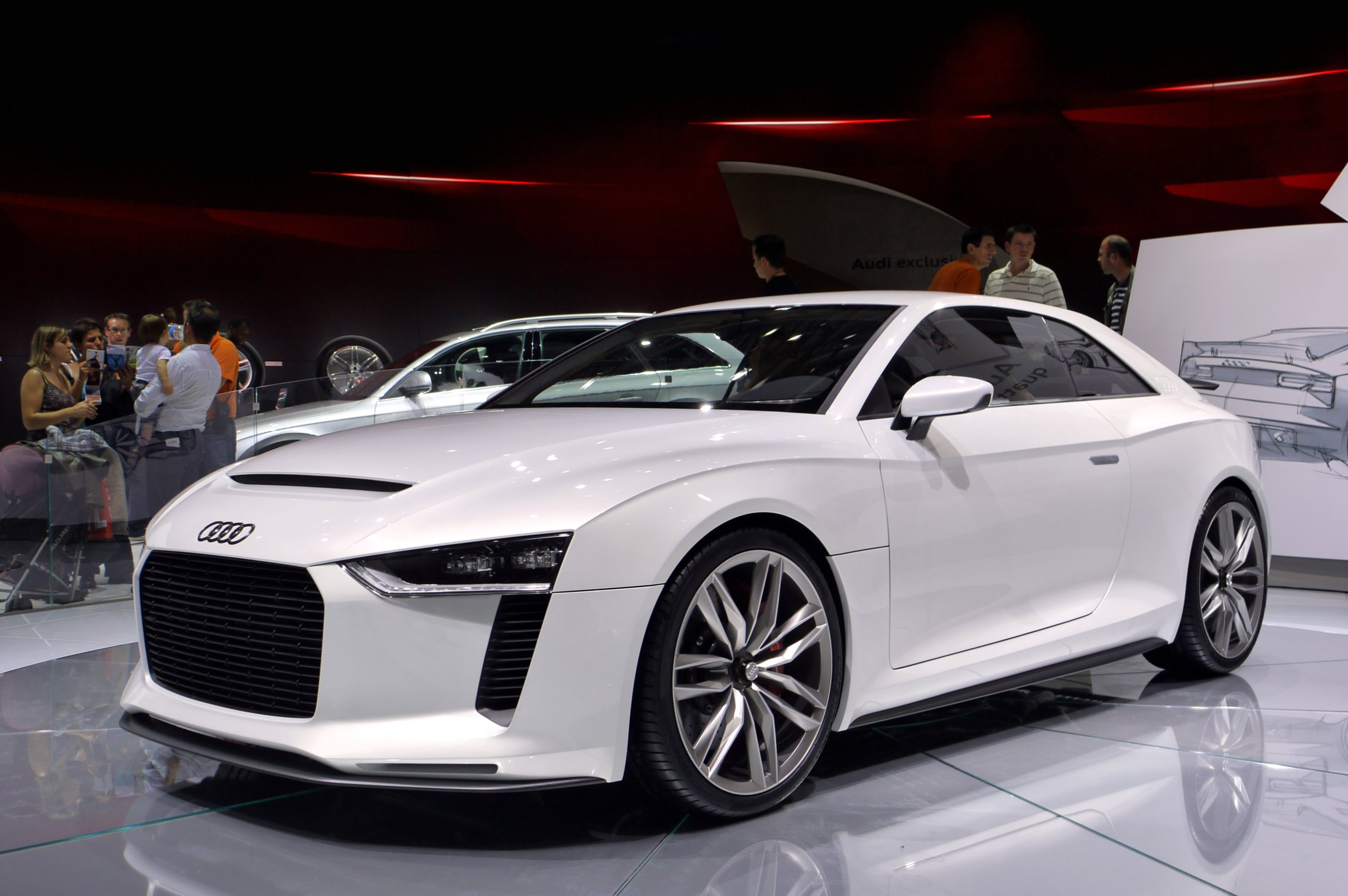
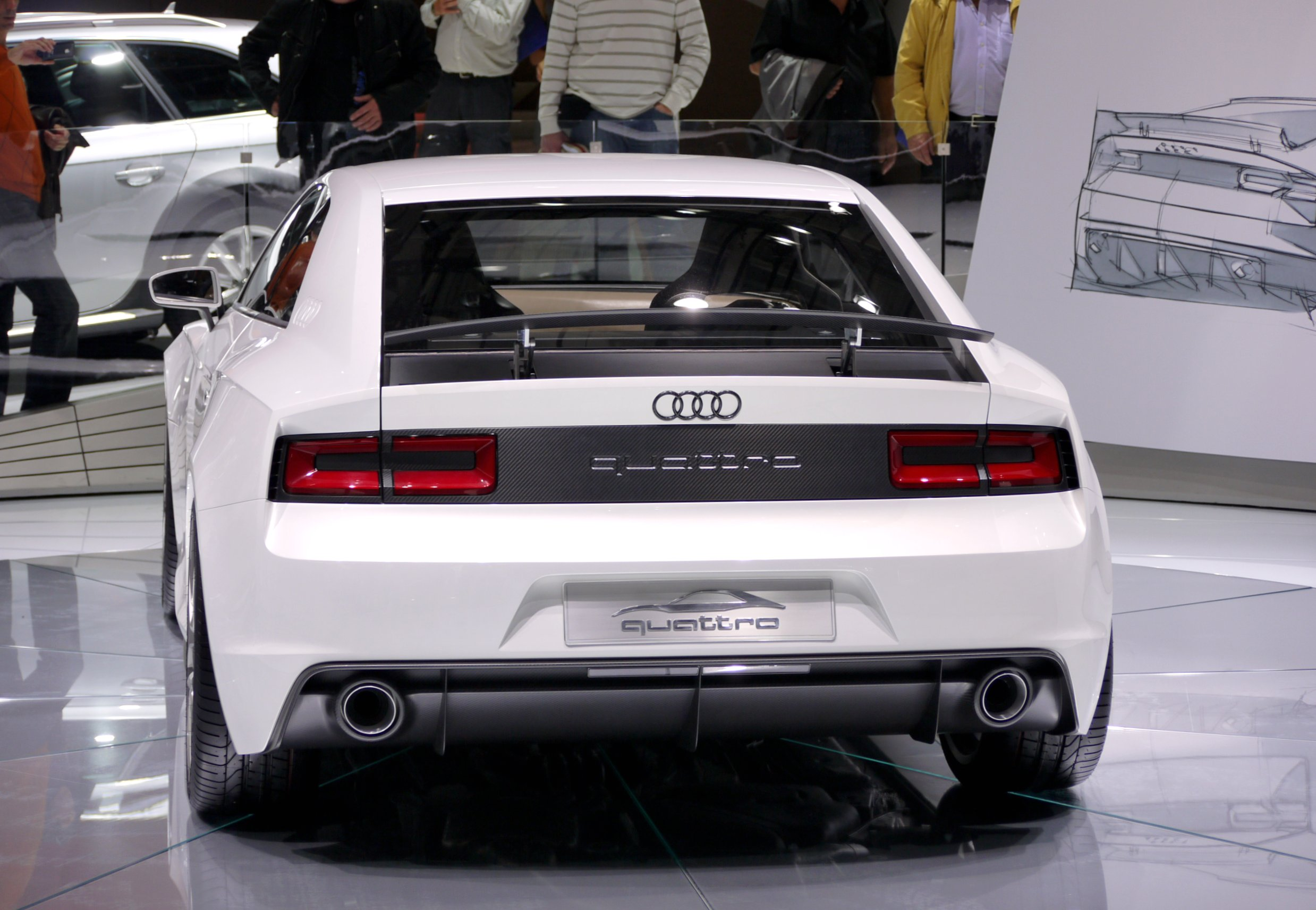
Audi quattro Concept at the 2010 Paris Motor Show

At the Paris Motor Show in 2010, Audi presented the quattro concept on the occasion of the 30th anniversary of the original Audi Quattro and the Audi quattro four-wheel-drive system. Based on the RS5, it features a modified 2.5 L five-cylinder TFSI engine shared with the TT and a 6-speed manual transmission from the S4. The engine was claimed to generate a maximum power output of 408 PS (300 kW; 402 hp) and 480 N⋅m (354 lb⋅ft) of torque. The revolutionary design features depicted on the concept car eventually made their way on future Audi models.

The concept utilised aluminium and carbon fibre construction which helped to achieve a total dry weight of 1,300 kg (2,866 lb). Weight saving was kept in consideration even throughout the interior and the seats also weighed 18 kg (40 lb) each besides having adjustment motors. The dashboard featured an LCD console displaying vital information about the car and buttons arranged in a vertical way on the binnacle harked back to the original Audi Quattro. The wheelbase was shortened by 152 mm (6 in) and the roof line was shortened by 30 mm (1.2 in) as compared to the RS5.

The Quattro four-wheel-drive system used in the concept was a rear-biased design utilising a two-stage differential distributing power front and aft through planetary gears.

The concept utilised carbon-ceramic braking system for improved stopping power. The car had a claimed 0–97 km/h (0–60 mph) acceleration time of 3.8 seconds.

It was reported that Audi was considering a limited production model (200–500 cars) based on the quattro concept. However, the idea of production was scrapped in favour of expanding the company's crossover range.

== Audi Sport quattro concept (2013) ==
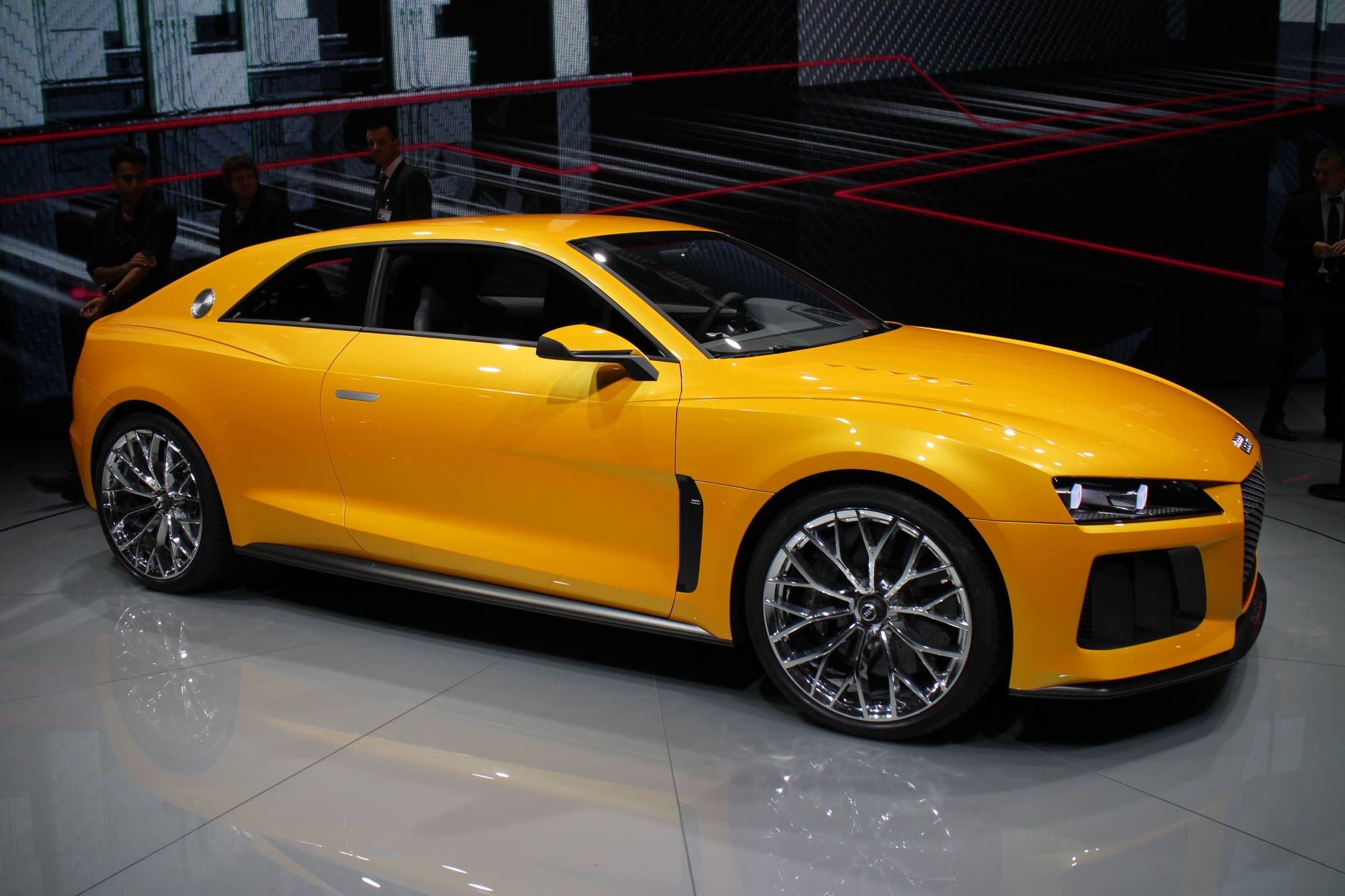
The Audi Sport quattro concept on display at IAA 2013

The Audi Sport quattro concept was unveiled at the 2013 Frankfurt Motor Show (IAA) to commemorate the 30th anniversary of the original Audi Sport quattro. The show car features angular flat C-pillars, as well as rectangular double headlights featuring Audi's Matrix LED technology, a spoiler at the lower edge of the rear window, rectangular tail lights, 21-inch wheels, carbon fibre-ceramic brake discs, bucket seats with integrated head restraints, multifunction sport steering wheel, two driving modes (race and setup) in virtual 3D displays, Audi MMI control unit, and air conditioning. The doors and fenders were made of aluminum, while the roof, hood, and the rear hatch were made of carbon fiber-reinforced polymer. The front suspension features five control arms per wheel while the rear has track-controlled trapezoidal link.

Power is from a 4.0 TFSI V8 engine rated at 560 PS (412 kW; 552 hp) and 700 N⋅m (516 lb⋅ft), along with a disc-shaped electric motor rated at 150 PS (110 kW; 148 hp) and 400 N⋅m (295 lb⋅ft) (for combined a power output of 700 PS (515 kW; 690 hp) and 800 N⋅m (590 lb⋅ft)), mated to an eight-speed tiptronic transmission. A liquid-cooled 14.1 kWh lithium-ion battery is located at the rear, and the range is claimed up to 50 km (31 mi) on electric power alone.

At the 2014 Geneva Motor Show, Audi presented the new 2014 Audi TT Quattro Sport Concept. It was powered by a 2.0 L four-cylinder TFSI engine generating a maximum power output of 420 PS (309 kW; 414 hp) and 331 N⋅m (244 lb⋅ft) of torque. The concept featured Audi's Quattro AWD system and an S Tronic dual-clutch transmission.

== Motorsport ==
=== Quattro - A1 and A2 evolutions ===
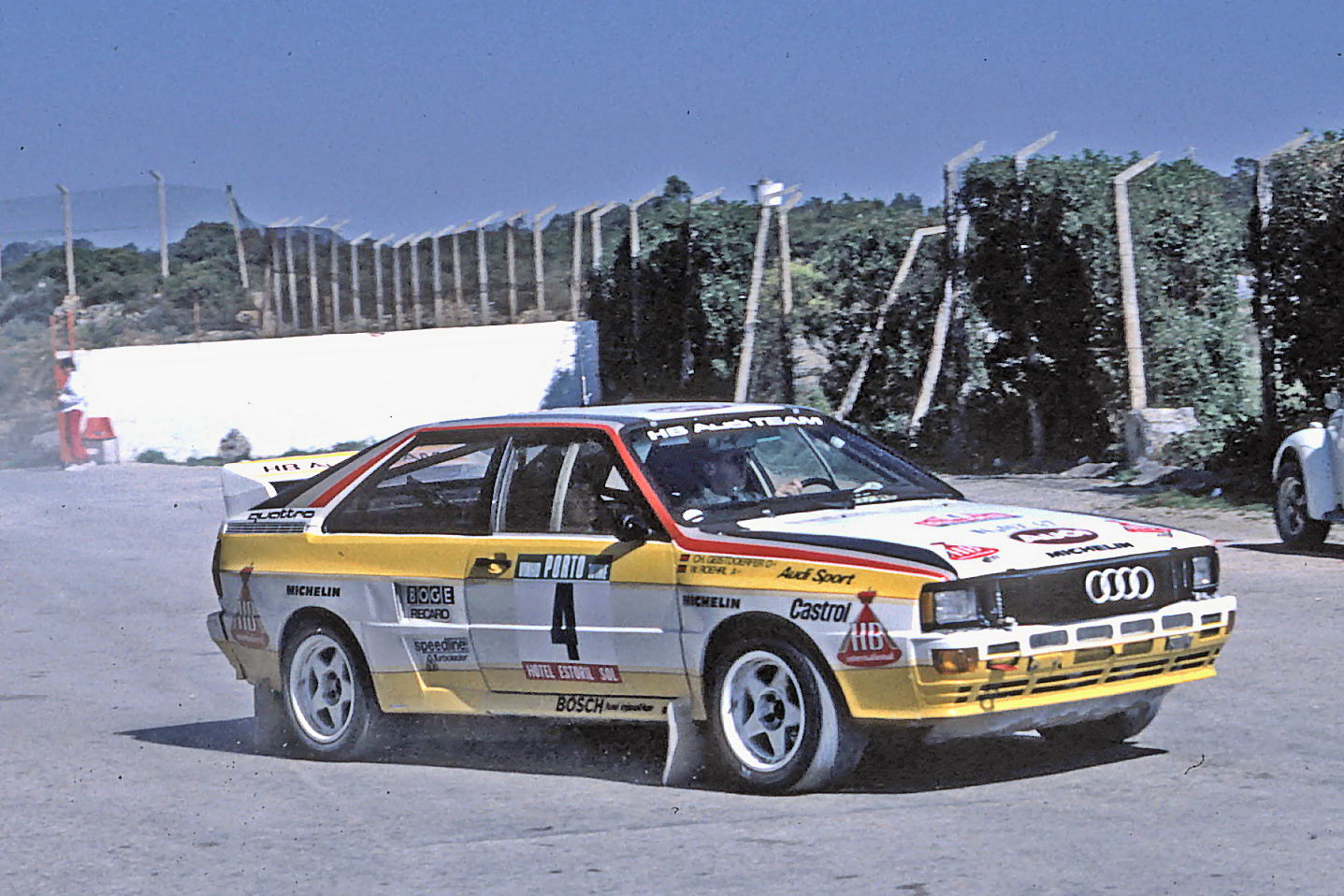
Walter Röhrl driving a Quattro A2 at the 1984 Rally Portugal

The original Audi Quattro competition car debuted in 1980, first as a development car (Course Car No. 0, Rali Urbibel Algarve Portugal 30 October to 1 November 1980), and then on a formal basis in the 1981 Jänner Rallye in Austria. Largely based on the bodyshell of the road-going Quattro models (in contrast to the forthcoming Group B cars), the engine of the original competition version produced approximately 304 PS (224 kW; 300 hp). In 1981, Michèle Mouton became the first female driver to win a world championship rally, piloting an Audi Quattro. Over the next three years, Audi would introduce the A1 and A2 evolutions of the Quattro in response to the new Group B rules, raising the power output of the turbocharged inline 5-cylinder engine to around 355 PS (261 kW; 350 hp).

The Quattro A1 debuted at the WRC 1983 season opener Monte Carlo Rally, and went on to win the Swedish Rally and the Rally Portugal in the hands of Hannu Mikkola. Driven by Stig Blomqvist, Mikkola and Walter Röhrl, the A2 evolution won a total of eight world rallies, three in 1983 and five in 1984. Two examples of the same car completely dominated the South African National Rally Championships during 1984 to 1988, with S.A. champion drivers Sarel van der Merwe and Geoff Mortimer.

In 1988, the Audi Ur-Quattro driven by Audi Tradition driver Luciano Viaro won the 13th Silvretta Classic Montafon.

=== Sport Quattro ===
Michèle Mouton's Audi Sport Quattro at the 2006 Goodwood Festival of Speed

The Audi Sport Quattro S1 was a variant of the Quattro developed for homologation for Group B rallying in 1984, and sold as a production car in limited numbers. It featured an all aluminium 2,133 cc (2.133 L) Inline-five engine with a bore x stroke of 79.3 mm × 86.4 mm (3.1 in × 3.4 in) DOHC 4 valves per cylinder, Bosch LH Jetronic fuel injection and a KKK K27 turbocharger. The engine was slightly smaller than that of the standard Audi Quattro in terms of displacement in order to qualify for the 3-litre engine class after the 1.4 multiplication factor applied to turbocharged engines. In road-going form, the engine was capable of generating 306 PS (302 hp; 225 kW) at 6,700 rpm and 350 N⋅m (258 lb⋅ft) at 3,700 rpm, with the engine on the competition cars initially generating around 331 kW (450 PS; 444 hp).

The car in competition form also featured a body shell composed of carbon-kevlar and wider wheel arches, wider wheels (nine inches as compared to the Ur-Quattro's optional 8-inch-wide (200 mm) wheels), the steeper windscreen rake of the Audi 80 (requested by the Audi Sport rally team drivers to reduce internal reflections from the dashboard for improved visibility) and, most noticeably, a 320 mm (12.6 in) shorter wheelbase.

In addition to Group B competition in rallying, the Sport Quattro won the 1985 Pikes Peak International Hill Climb with Michèle Mouton in the driving seat, setting a record time in the process. 224 cars in total of this "short version" Sport Quattro were built, and were offered for sale for DM 203,850.

=== Sport Quattro S1 E2 ===
Audi Sport Quattro S1 E2
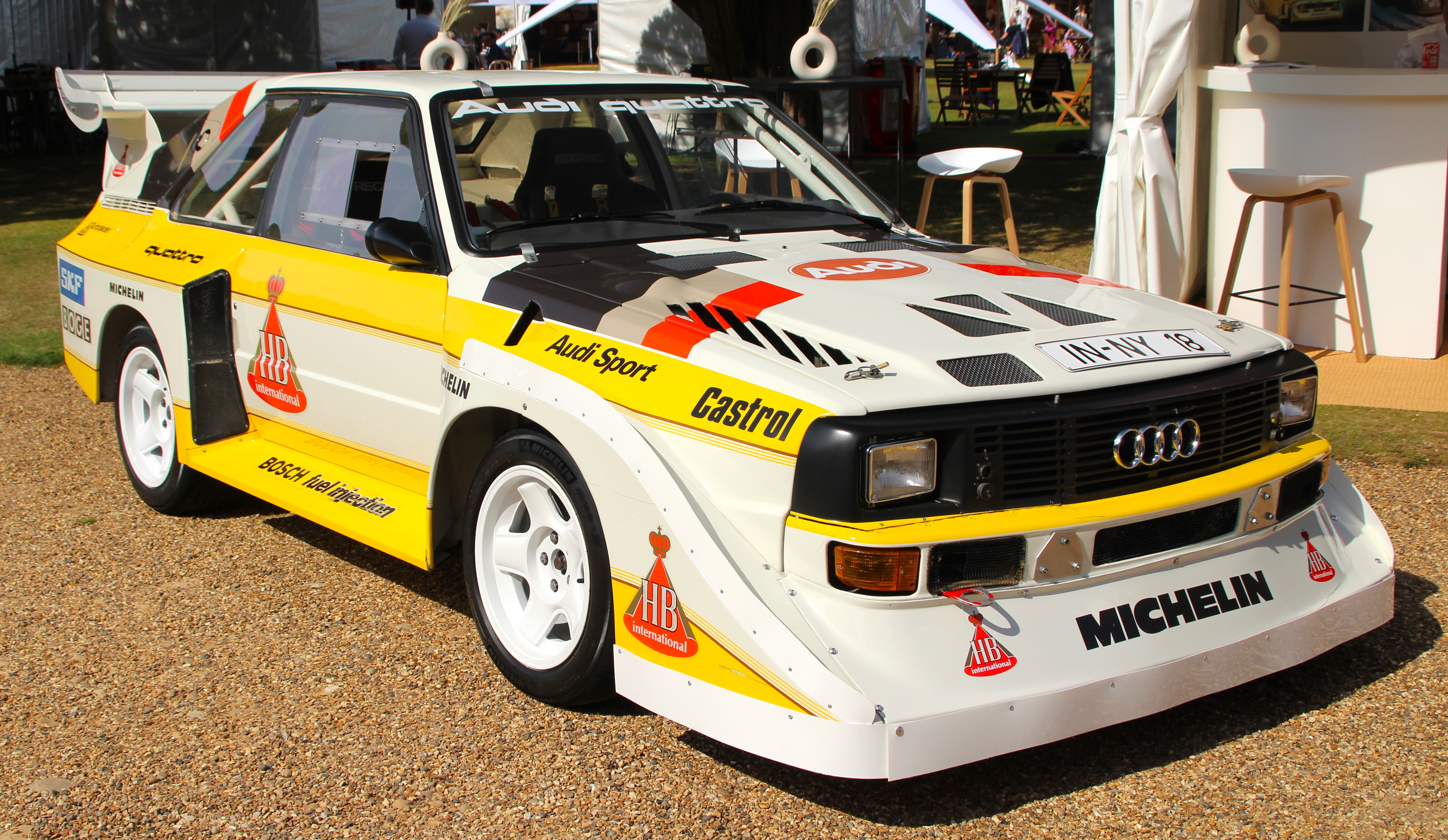
- Audi Sport Quattro S1 E2

Overview
- Manufacturer: Audi AG
- Also called: S1, S1 Quattro "Audi Sport Quattro E2"
- Production: 1985–1986
- Assembly: Ingolstadt, Germany

Body and chassis
- Class: Coupé, Group B rally car
- Body style: 2-door coupé
- Layout: longitudinal front-engine four-wheel-drive
- Related: Audi Quattro

Powertrain
- Engine: 2.1 L (2,110 cc) turbocharged I5
- Transmission: 6-speed manual

Dimensions
- Wheelbase: 2,204 mm (86.8 in)
- Length: 4,240 mm (166.9 in)
- Width: 1,860 mm (73.2 in)
- Height: 1,344 mm (52.9 in)
- Kerb weight: 1,200 kg (2,646 lb)

Chronology
- Predecessor: Audi Sport Quattro

1985 Audi Sport Quattro S1

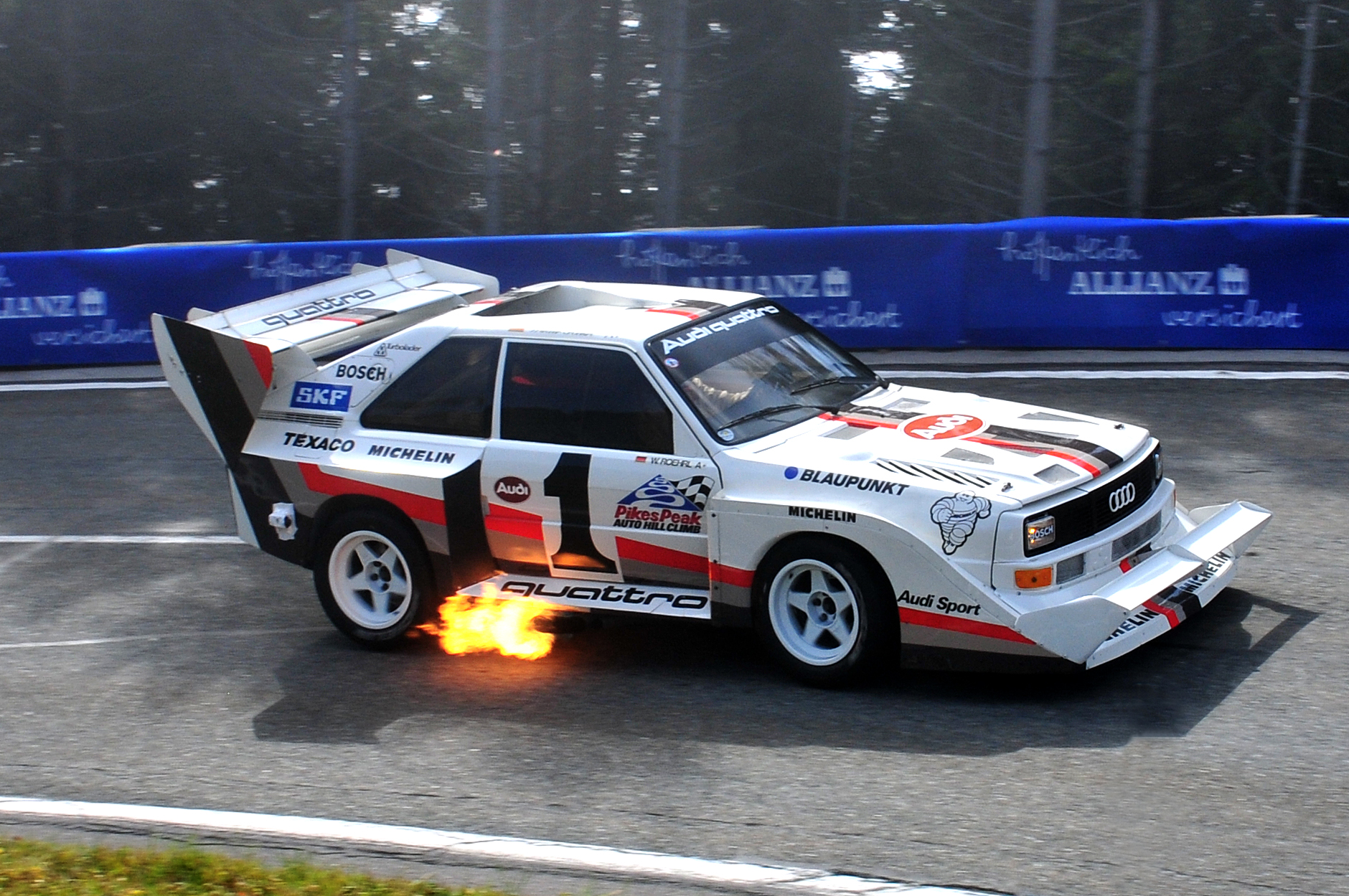
Audi Sport Quattro S1 E2, Pikes Peak version

The Audi Sport Quattro S1 E2 was introduced at the end of 1985 as an update to the Audi Sport Quattro S1. The car featured an inline five-cylinder engine that displaced 2,110 cc (128.8 cu in) from a bore and stroke of 79.5 mm × 85.0 mm (3.13 in × 3.35 in) and generated an officially quoted power output figure of 480 PS (353 kW; 473 hp). However, the turbocharger utilised a recirculating air system, with the aim of keeping the unit spinning at high rpm, when the driver closed the throttle, either to back off during cornering, or on gearshifts. This allowed the engine to resume full power immediately after the resumption of full throttle, reducing turbo lag. The actual power figure was in excess of 500 PS (368 kW; 493 hp) at 8,000 rpm.

In addition to the improved power output, an aggressive aerodynamic kit was added that featured very distinctive wings and spoilers at the front and rear of the car to increase downforce. The weight was reduced to 1,090 kg (2,403 lb). The S1 could accelerate from 0-100 km/h (62 mph) in 3.1 seconds. Some of the cars were supplied with a "power-shift gearbox", a forerunner of the DSG technology.

The S1 E2 made its debut at the 1985 Rally Argentina, with Blomqvist driving. This variant was successful in the rally circuit, with Röhrl and Christian Geistdörfer winning the 1985 San Remo Rally. A modified version of the S1 (the E2), was also driven by Hannu Mikkola and Michèle Mouton. The S1 E2 would become the final Group B car produced by Audi, with the works team withdrawing from the Championship following the 1986 rally in Portugal. The final factory cars of 1986 were rated at 600 PS (441 kW; 592 hp). In 1987, the car won the Pikes Peak International Hill Climb driven by Walter Röhrl.

=== Sport Quattro RS 002 ===
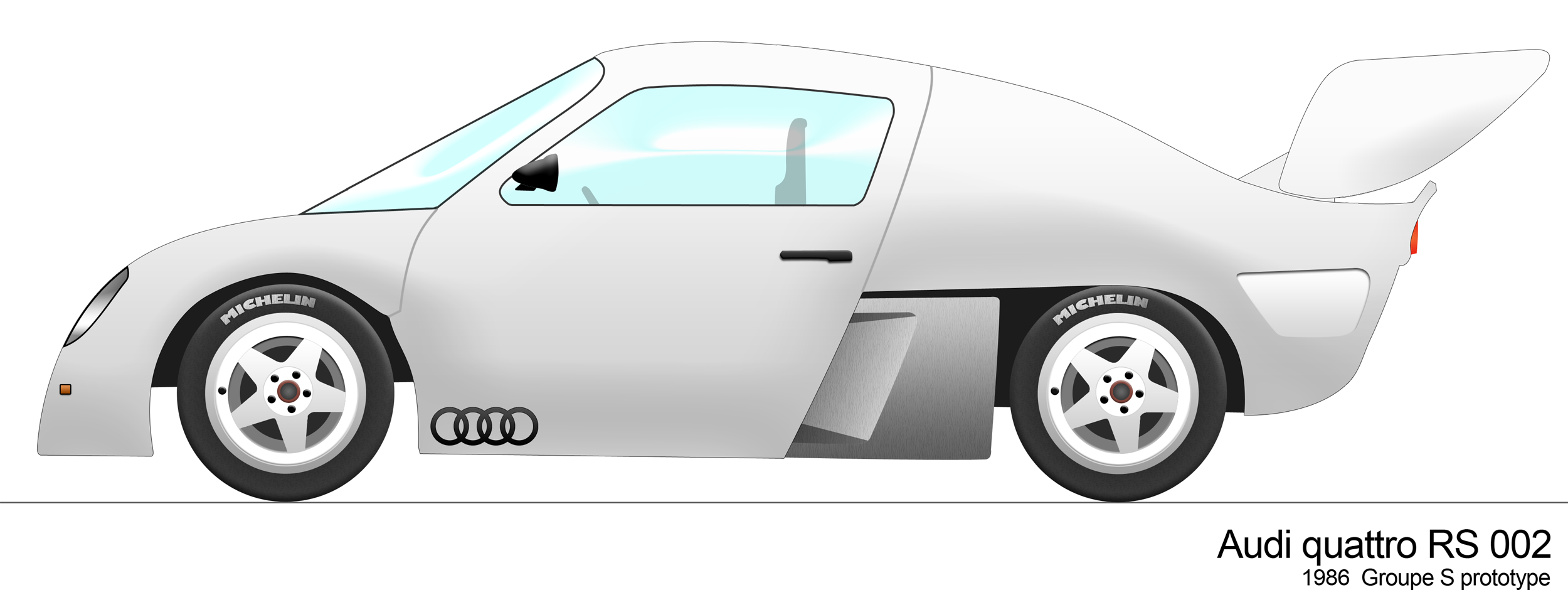
Audi Sport Quattro RS 002

Audi Sport Quattro RS 002 - Sports prototype "Group S" was a rally car that was initially designed for the forthcoming Group S regulations for 1987. The car was tested by Walter Röhrl but it never raced; the Group S regulations were scrapped along with the Group B regulations after a number of accidents involving fatalities during the 1986 season.

The car has a longitudinal mid-engine layout and a four-wheel drive system.

Specifications:

Kerb weight: 1,000 kg (2,205 lb)
Engine: 2,100 cc (2.1 L) I5
Power: 700 PS (515 kW; 690 hp)
Top speed: 300 km/h (186 mph)
Dimensions: Length 4,500 mm, Width 1,900 mm, Height 1,020 mm.

=== WRC results ===
==== Summary ====
| Season | Model(s) | Driver | Pos. | Pts |
|---|---|---|---|---|
| 1981 | Audi Quattro | (Finland) Hannu Mikkola (3rd) • (France) Michèle Mouton (8th) | 5th | 63 |
| 1982 | Audi Quattro | (France) Michèle Mouton (2nd) • (Finland) Hannu Mikkola (3rd) • (Sweden) Stig Blomqvist (4th) | 1st | 116 |
| 1983 | Audi Quattro A1 and Audi Quattro A2 | (Finland) Hannu Mikkola (1st) • (Sweden) Stig Blomqvist (3rd) • (France) Michèle Mouton (5th) | 2nd | 116 |
| 1984 | Audi Quattro A2 and Audi Sport Quattro S1 | (Sweden) Stig Blomqvist (1st) • (Finland) Hannu Mikkola (2nd) • (Germany) Walter Röhrl (11th) • (France) Michèle Mouton(12th) | 1st | 120 |
| 1985 | Audi Sport Quattro S1 | (Sweden) Stig Blomqvist (2nd) • (Germany) Walter Röhrl (3rd) • (Finland) Hannu Mikkola (22nd) | 2nd | 126 |
| 1986 | Audi Sport Quattro S1 E2 | (Finland) Hannu Mikkola (18th) • (Germany) Walter Röhrl (22nd) | 4th | 29 |

==== WRC victories ====
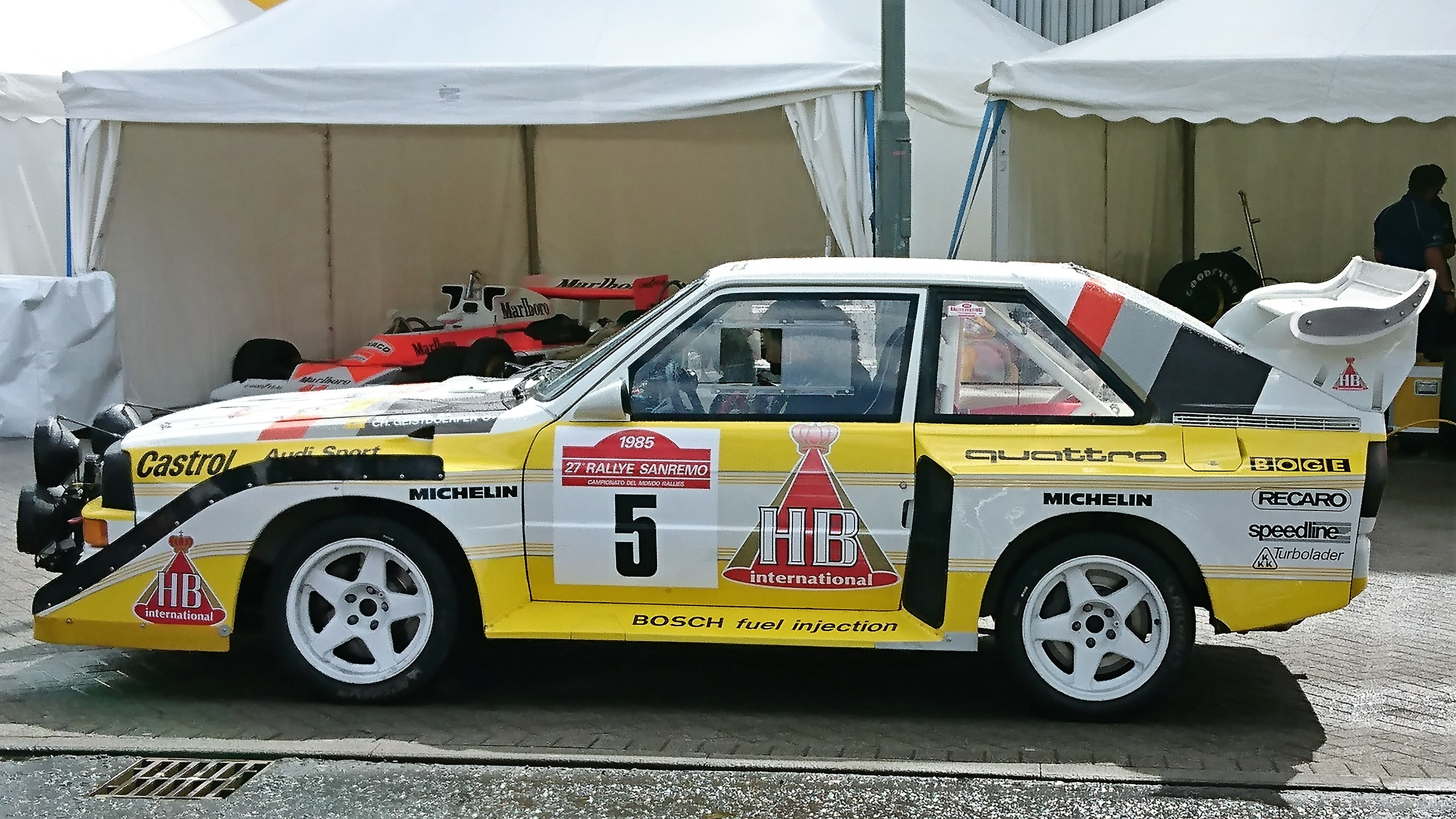
The Quattro's final WRC victory came from Walter Röhrl, at the 1985 Rallye Sanremo. The car was paraded at the Ignition Festival of Motoring in 2017.

| # | Event | Season | Driver | Co-driver | Version |
|---|---|---|---|---|---|
| 1 | (Sweden) 31st International Swedish Rally | 1981 | (Finland) Hannu Mikkola | (Sweden) Arne Hertz | Audi Quattro |
| 2 | (Italy) 23º Rallye Sanremo | 1981 | (France) Michèle Mouton | (Italy) Fabrizia Pons | Audi Quattro |
| 3 | (United Kingdom) 30th Lombard RAC Rally | 1981 | (Finland) Hannu Mikkola | (Sweden) Arne Hertz | Audi Quattro |
| 4 | (Sweden) 32nd International Swedish Rally | 1982 | (Sweden) Stig Blomqvist | (Sweden) Björn Cederberg | Audi Quattro |
| 5 | 16º Rallye de Portugal Vinho do Porto | 1982 | (France) Michèle Mouton | (Italy) Fabrizia Pons | Audi Quattro |
| 6 | (Greece) 29º Acropolis Rally | 1982 | (France) Michèle Mouton | (Italy) Fabrizia Pons | Audi Quattro |
| 7 | Rally of Brazil | 1982 | (France) Michèle Mouton | (Italy) Fabrizia Pons | Audi Quattro |
| 8 | (Finland) 32º 1000 Lakes Rally | 1982 | (Finland) Hannu Mikkola | (Sweden) Arne Hertz | Audi Quattro |
| 9 | (Italy) 24º Rallye Sanremo | 1982 | (Sweden) Stig Blomqvist | (Sweden) Björn Cederberg | Audi Quattro |
| 10 | (United Kingdom) 31st Lombard RAC Rally | 1982 | (Finland) Hannu Mikkola | (Sweden) Arne Hertz | Audi Quattro |
| 11 | (Sweden) 33rd International Swedish Rally | 1983 | (Finland) Hannu Mikkola | (Sweden) Arne Hertz | Audi Quattro A1 |
| 12 | 17º Rallye de Portugal Vinho do Porto | 1983 | (Finland) Hannu Mikkola | (Sweden) Arne Hertz | Audi Quattro A1 |
| 13 | 3º Marlboro Rally Argentina San Carlos de Bariloche | 1983 | (Finland) Hannu Mikkola | (Sweden) Arne Hertz | Audi Quattro A2 |
| 14 | (Finland) 33º 1000 Lakes Rally | 1983 | (Finland) Hannu Mikkola | (Sweden) Arne Hertz | Audi Quattro A2 |
| 15 | (United Kingdom) 32nd Lombard RAC Rally | 1983 | (Sweden) Stig Blomqvist | (Sweden) Björn Cederberg | Audi Quattro A2 |
| 16 | (Monaco) 52ème Rallye Automobile de Monte-Carlo | 1984 | (Germany) Walter Röhrl | (Germany) Christian Geistdörfer | Audi Quattro A2 |
| 17 | (Sweden) 34th International Swedish Rally | 1984 | (Sweden) Stig Blomqvist | (Sweden) Björn Cederberg | Audi Quattro A2 |
| 18 | 18º Rallye de Portugal Vinho do Porto | 1984 | (Finland) Hannu Mikkola | (Sweden) Arne Hertz | Audi Quattro A2 |
| 19 | (Greece) 31º Acropolis Rally | 1984 | (Sweden) Stig Blomqvist | (Sweden) Björn Cederberg | Audi Quattro A2 |
| 20 | 14º Sanyo Rally of New Zealand | 1984 | (Sweden) Stig Blomqvist | (Sweden) Björn Cederberg | Audi Quattro A2 |
| 21 | 4º Marlboro Rally of Argentina YPF Cordoba | 1984 | (Sweden) Stig Blomqvist | (Sweden) Björn Cederberg | Audi Quattro A2 |
| 22 | (Ivory Coast) 16ème Rallye "Marlboro" Côte d'Ivoire | 1984 | (Sweden) Stig Blomqvist | (Sweden) Björn Cederberg | Audi Sport Quattro S1 |
| 23 | (Italy) 27º Rallye Sanremo | 1985 | (Germany) Walter Röhrl | (Germany) Christian Geistdörfer | Audi Sport Quattro S1 E2 |

== In popular culture ==
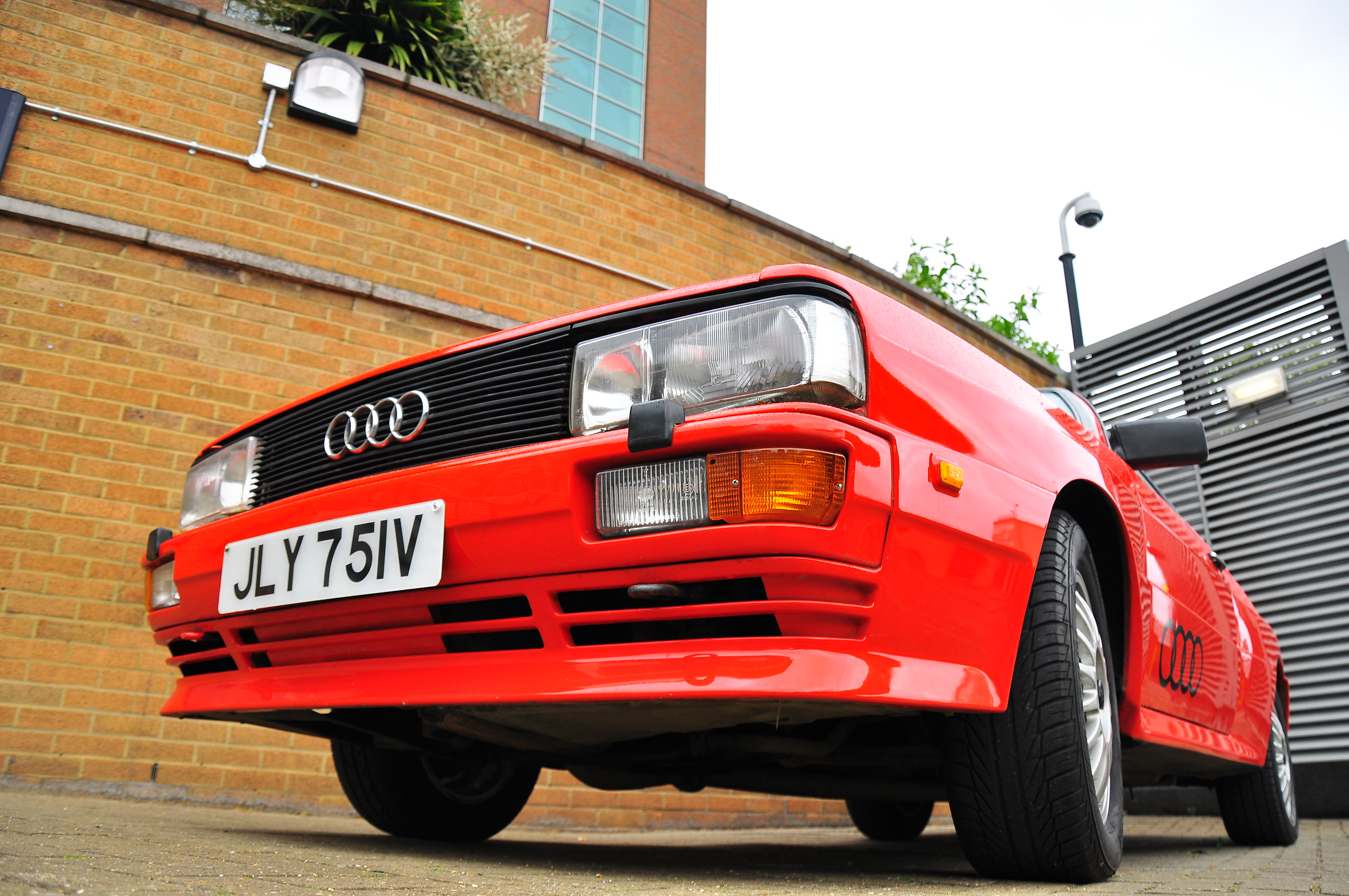
Gene Hunt's Quattro in the car park of BBC Television Centre

A red 1983 Quattro was driven by DCI Gene Hunt (played by Philip Glenister) in the television drama Ashes to Ashes (aired on BBC1 from 2008 to 2010). Two cars were used through the run of the series: the original, and a stunt car that was acquired for series 2. Both portrayed the same car. The original vehicle (also used in the Children in Need Top Gear crossover mini-episode) lacked a sunroof which was present on the car(s) used in series 2 and 3, hence a fake one was added for the sake of continuity. The stunt car was written off for the jump in series 3, episode 1 by the director of that episode and used as a parts and interior shots car until it was shot up in the finale, leaving the original car intact.

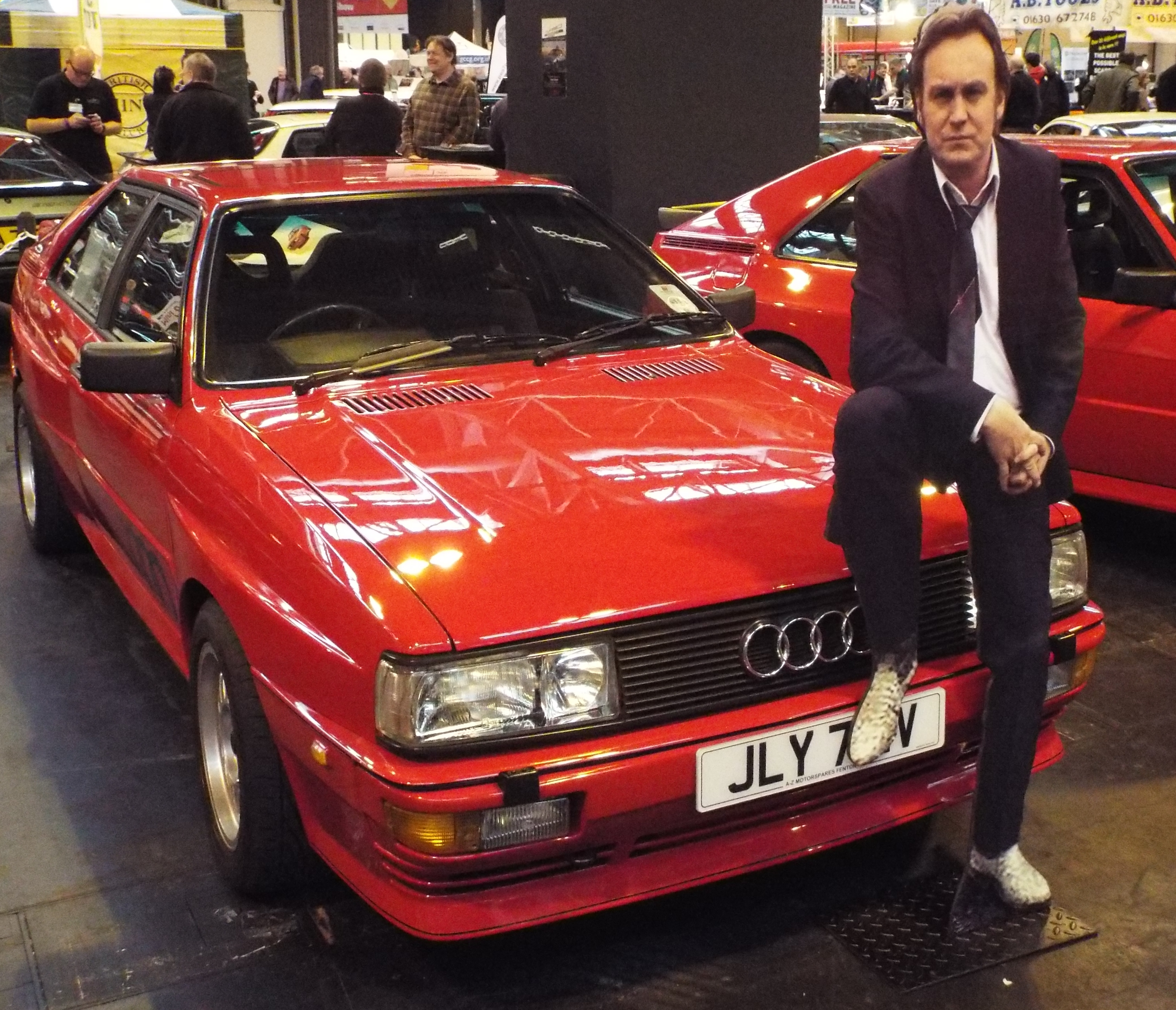
The type of the poster used by the Labour Party during the 2010 election campaign

In the run-up to the 2010 general election, a campaign poster by the incumbent Labour Party government portrayed Conservative Party and opposition leader David Cameron as Gene Hunt sitting on the bonnet of the iconic red Audi Quattro and urged voters not to allow Cameron to take Britain "back to the 1980s" by electing his party into government amid fears that it would lead to a repeat of the social unrest and unemployment that Margaret Thatcher's Conservative government of that era oversaw. The image was then adopted by the Conservatives, with the slogan "Fire up the Quattro, it's time for change", with the comment 'Idea kindly donated by the Labour Party'. "Fire up the Quattro" was a call to action uttered by DCI Hunt in Ashes to Ashes.

== See also ==
- AMC Eagle, the first mass-produced all-wheel-drive car introduced in August 1979
- Audi S and RS models
- Jensen FF, the first all-wheel-drive road car, introduced in 1966
