= Heinrich Bensing =

German opera singer

Heinrich Bensing (26 July 1911 – 30 December 1955) was a German opera singer.

== Life ==
Bensing was born in Metz. After the Second World War, he had guest contracts with the Hamburg State Opera (1947-1955), with the Vienna State Opera (1949-1954) and with the Cologne Opera House. After 1945 he sang Don José in Carmen, the title role in The Tales of Hoffmann, the Duke of Mantua in Rigoletto, Radames in Aida, the title role in Don Carlos and Pinkerton in Madama Butterfly.

Bensing died in Frankfurt at age 44.

== Repertoire ==
Bensing was especially considered a valued singer in the Italian repertoire. He belonged to the "small circle of German tenors who possessed vocal brilliance and power for the great parts of Italian opera."

== Recordings ==
On the occasion of the re-release of this radio production of Die Frau ohne Schatten from the year 1950 (Symphonie-Orchester des Hessischen Rundfunks, conductor: Winfried Zillig) on CD, Bensing's "experience in the Italian sector", his "largely effortless mastery of the unpleasant tessitura" and his " easily understandable youthful heroic tenor" were particularly praised.

== Sources ==
- Karl-Josef Kutsch, Leo Riemens: Großes Sängerlexikon. Third, extended edition. Munich 1999. Volume 1: Aarden–Davis, p. 263/264. ISBN 3-598-11419-2
- Kutsch, Karl-Josef; Riemens, Leo (2004-01-01). Großes Sängerlexikon (in German). Walter de Gruyter. ISBN 9783598440885.
