= Jörg Bensinger =

German automobile engineer

Jörg Bensinger is a German automotive chassis engineer, who pioneered four-wheel drive (all-wheel) transmission for conventional (on-road) automobiles in the 1980s, first developing the idea in 1977.

== Career ==
=== Audi ===
He joined the R&D department of Audi in 1968.

=== Four wheel-drive ===
He tested a Volkswagen Iltis, a four-wheel drive military off-road vehicle, with another engineer Roland Gumpert in the late 1970s in Finland. He proposed a four-wheel drive road vehicle in February 1977 to Ferdinand Piëch, the head of R&D at Audi and Walter Treser. The go-ahead was given to test the idea with an Audi 80, with an allrad (all-wheel) design, without a centre differential. Parts from an Audi 100 were also taken to produce the new transmission design.

The car received the backing from the board of management of Audi in September 1977. The vehicle was tested on the Turracher Höhe Pass in Austria, one of the steepest routes in Europe, climbing the snow-covered 23% gradient without snow tyres. The vehicle was given to the head of R&D at Volkswagen, the Austrian Ernst Fiala, to test. A main feature is the dual-direction transmission system invented by Audi's head of transmission, Franz Tengler.

The new car, the Audi Quattro, under head of Audi design Hartmut Warkuß, was launched in Europe in 1980. It had a 2.1 litre turbocharged ten-valve straight-five engine that produced 197 bhp; it could go from 0-60 mph in seven seconds. The car, driven by Michèle Mouton, entered the 1981 World Rally Championship, and dominated the World Rally Championship (WRC) for the next years.

== Personal ==
He married Jutta Raisch, who is also a glider pilot. They fly their gliders from Vaumeilh airfield.

== See also ==
- Rod Mansfield, British pioneering rally car designer
