= Giro d'Italia automobilistico =

Italian automobile race (1901-1973)

- Category: Sports cars
- Country: Italy
- Inaugural season: 1901, 1973
- Classes: 1973–1980: Group 5, Group 4, Group 3, Group 2, Group 1

The Giro d'Italia automobilistico was an automobile race around Italy, historically first held in 1901, then reinstituted as annual event between 1973 and 1980, resurrected for 1988 and 1989, and again in 2011. Both in its historical and modern iterations the Giro d'Italia was inspired by its French equivalent, the Tour de France Automobile.

== History ==
=== 1901 ===
The first Giro d'Italia was organised by Club automobilistico di Torino (Automobile club of Turin) with the patronage of Milanese newspaper Il Corriere della Sera. Seventy-two crews enrolled.

The race started on 27 April 1901 in Turin; of the 72 cars which had enrolled, only 32 were present at the starting line. These included nine Fiats, four Panhards, four Peugeots, three Renaults, two Rossellis, two Morses, and one each from Benz, Ceirano, Delahaye, Marchand, Daimler, De Dion, Isotta Fraschini and Darracq.

=== 1934 ===
The 1934 edition was held over three days and 5,687 km (3,534 mi), on a circular route from Rome to Calabria and back, including a stage in Messina on the island of Sicily. Carlo Pintacuda and Mario Nardilli won in a Lancia Astura.

=== 1954 ===
The 1954 edition was held over ten days, seven stages and 5,763 km (3,581 mi), beginning and ending at the Monza Circuit and stopping at Sanremo, Naples, Bari, Rimini, Merano and Turin along the way. Luigi Taramazzo and Gerino Gerini won in an Alfa Romeo 1900 SS.

=== 1973 ===
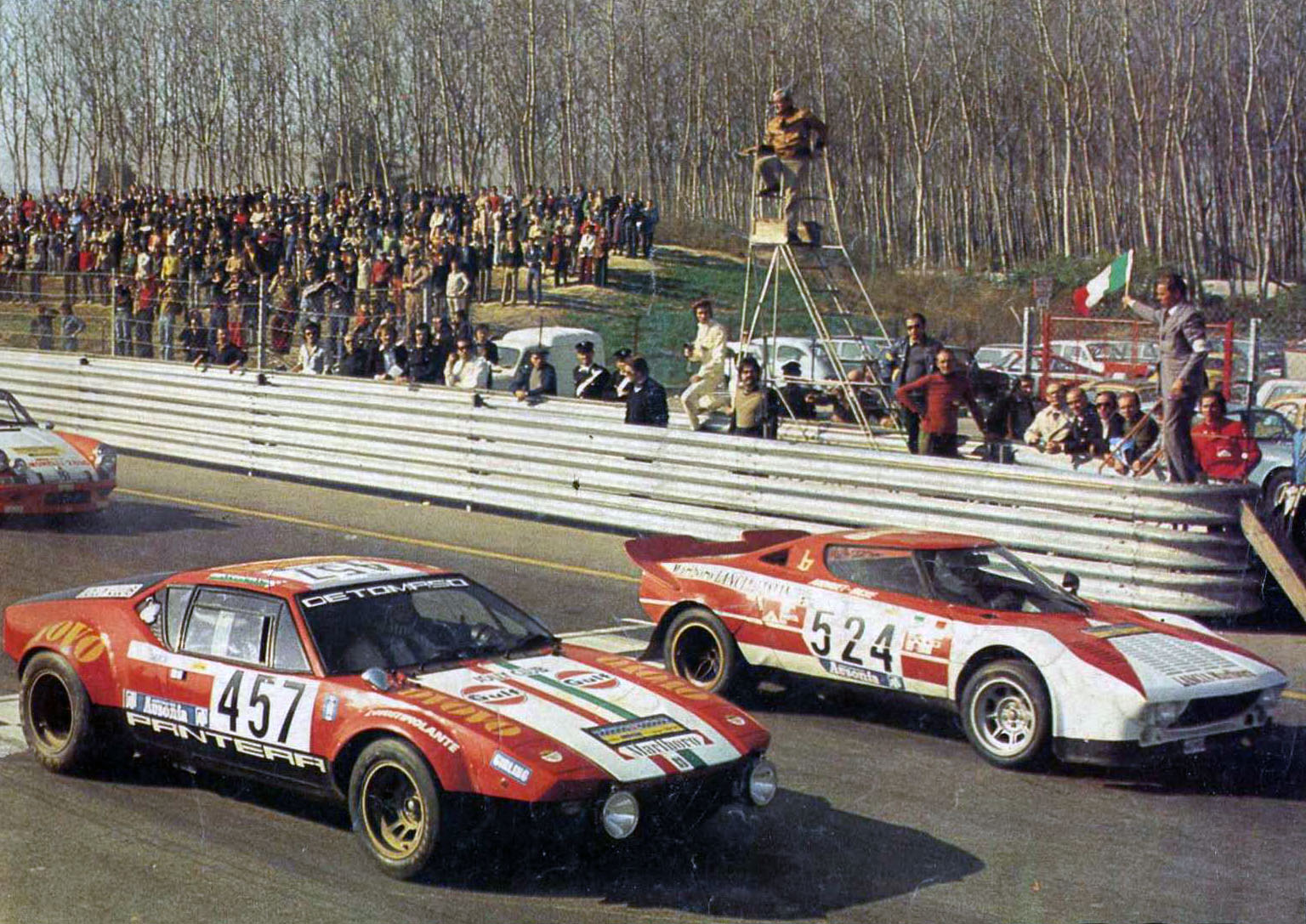
Mario Casoni's De Tomaso Pantera Gr. 4 of Jolly Club (no. 457), 1973 edition winner, and Jean-Claude Andruet's Lancia Stratos Marlboro Prototype (no. 524), at the start of Casale Monferrato special stage.

The first Giro d'Italia automobilistico took place between 24 and 28 October. The race was part of the Italian Group 4 Championship.

Route and events
Day	Leg	Circuit or route	Event
25 October	Turin–Varano de' Melegari	Cesana–Sestriere	Hillclimb
25 October	Turin–Varano de' Melegari	Autodromo di Casale	Circuit race
26 October	Varano de' Melegari–Misano Adriatico	Autodromo di Varano	Time trial
26 October	Varano de' Melegari–Misano Adriatico	Autodromo del Mugello	Circuit race
26 October	Varano de' Melegari–Misano Adriatico	Autodromo Dino Ferrari	Circuit race
26 October	Varano de' Melegari–Misano Adriatico	Autodromo di Misano	Night time trial
27 October	Misano Adriatico–Turin	Autodromo di Misano	Circuit race
27 October	Misano Adriatico–Turin	Autodromo di Varano	Circuit race
27 October	Misano Adriatico–Turin	Autodromo di Casale	Night time trial

Podium finishers
Rank	Drivers	Team Car	Class	Time
1	(Italy) Casoni; (Italy) Minganti	(Italy) Scuderia Nettuno (Italy) De Tomaso Pantera Gr.4	Gr. 4	55 m 35.0 s
2	(Italy) Bonomelli; (Italy) Bonomelli	(Italy) Bonomelli Squadra Corse (Germany) Porsche 911	Gr. 5	57 m 11.2 s
3	(Italy) Borri; (Italy) Anzalone	(Italy) Brescia Corse (Germany) Porsche 911	Gr. 5	59 m 57.3 s

Class winners
Class	Drivers	Car	Time
Group 5
>1300 cc	Bonomelli-Bonomelli	Porsche 911	57 m 11.2 s
Group 4
>2000 cc	Casoni-Minganti	De Tomaso Pantera Gr.4	55 m 35.0 s
2000 cc	Dal Ben-Besenzoni	Fiat 124 S	1 h 08 m 47.8 s
1600 cc	Mussa-Martino	Alfa Romeo Giulia GTA	1 h 05 m 53.8 s
1300 cc	Artina-Librizzi	Alpine Renault 1300 S	1 h 22 m 05.3 s

=== 1974 ===
The 2º Giro d'Italia automobilistico took place between 14 and 20 October. The race was part of the Italian Group 4 Championship.

The works Fiat Rally team fielded four cars: two Fiat Abarth X1/9 prototypes (one driven by Ferrari F1 pilot Clay Regazzoni), a mysterious Abarth SE 030 prototype (based on the as yet unreleased Lancia Montecarlo), which scored a remarkable second place on its first outing, and finally a Group 4 124 Abarth Rally.

Lancia was represented by the Andruet/"Biche" team and their victorious Lancia Stratos Turbo. Another notable entrant was Arturo Merzario, in an ill-prepared Jolly Club Group 5 Stratos, stopped by an engine seizure on the first day, at Casale.

Of the 85 on the starting grid, 52 finished the race.

Route and events
Day	Leg	Circuit or route	Event
15 October	Turin–Imola	Cesana–Sestriere	Hillclimb
15 October	Turin–Imola	Autodromo di Casale	Race
16 October	Imola–Misano Adriatico	Autodromo Dino Ferrari	Race
16 October	Imola–Misano Adriatico	Autodromo del Mugello	Race
17 October	Misano Adriatico–Vallelunga	Autodromo di Misano	Race
17 October	Misano Adriatico–Vallelunga	S. Stefano–Passo dello Spino	Hillclimb
17 October	Misano Adriatico–Vallelunga	Autodromo di Magione	Race
18 October	Vallelunga–Parma	Autodromo di Vallelunga	Race
18 October	Vallelunga–Parma	S. Giorgio–Colonnetta	Hillclimb
18 October	Vallelunga–Parma	Quercegrossa–Croce Fiorentina	Hillclimb
19 October	Parma–Turin	Autodromo di Varano	Race
19 October	Parma–Turin	Autodromo di Monza	Race

Podium finishers
Rank	Drivers	Team Car	Class	Time
1	(France) Andruet; (France) "Biche"	(Italy) Lancia Corse (Italy) Lancia Stratos Turbo	Gr. 5	1 h 18 m 41.5 s
2	(Italy) Pianta; (Belgium) "Christine"	(Italy) Abarth (Italy) Abarth SE 030	Gr. 5	1 h 22 m 43.4 s
3	(Italy) Govoni; (Italy) Angelelli	(Italy) Scuderia Nettuno (Italy) De Tomaso Pantera Gr.4	Gr. 4	1 h 24 m 10.5 s

=== 1975 ===
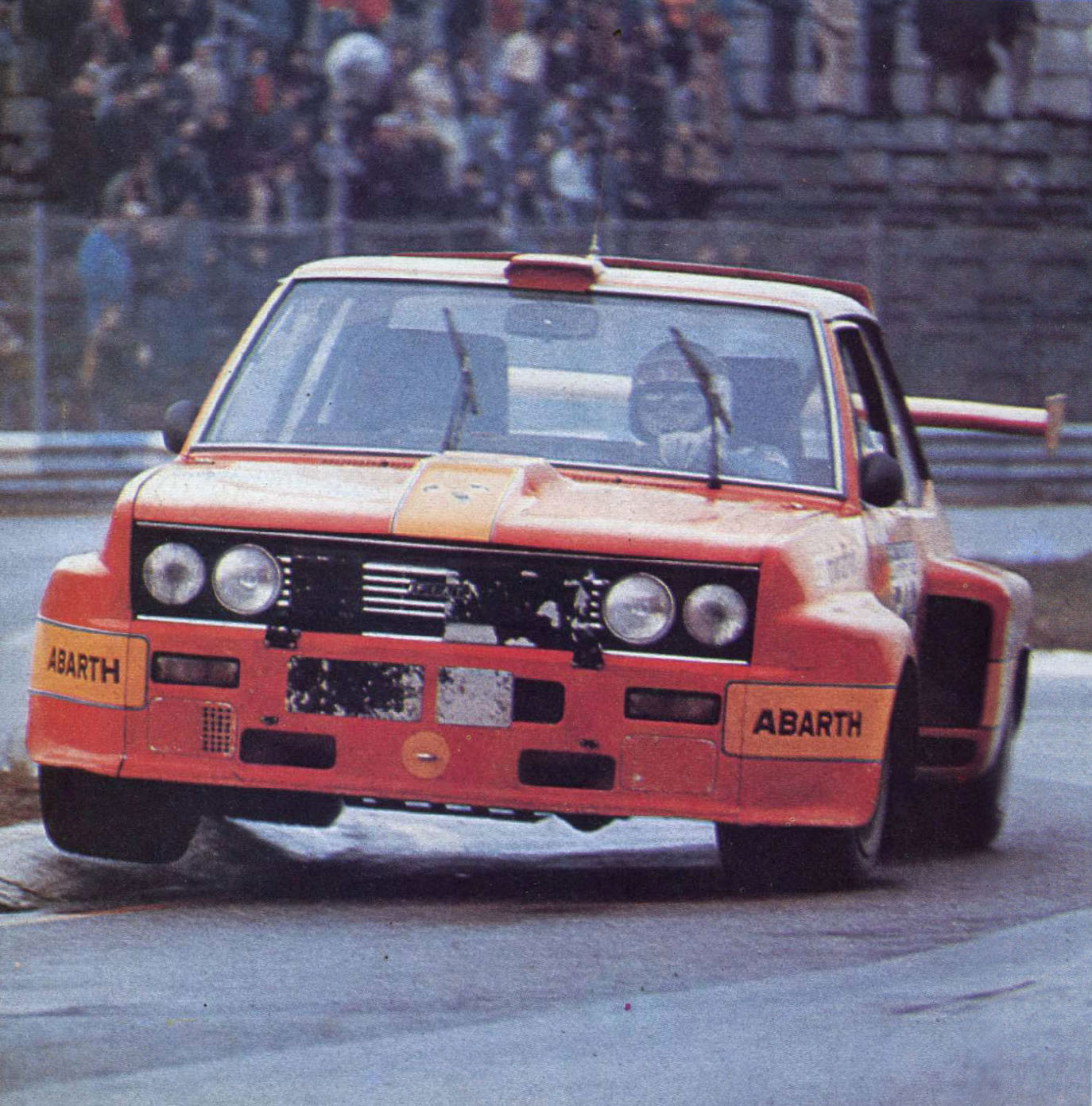
Giorgio Pianta's Fiat Abarth 031, 1975 edition winner, in action at the Imola stage.

The 3º Giro d'Italia automobilistico took place between 11 and 18 October. For 1975 the coefficient for hillclimb races times was raised to 3:1, thus favouring rally drivers over circuit drivers, less accustomed to racing on closed public roads; no Formula One drivers took parts to the 3rd Giro. Autodelta fielded an Alfa Romeo 33/3 in Group 5. The favourite Munari/Maiga duo ended sixth, but only after having witnessed their Alitalia Stratos Turbo burn to the ground after the last race. Winner were Pianta and Scabini on a 3.5-litre Abarth SE 031, a prototype based on a heavily modified Fiat 131.

Day	Leg	Circuit or route	Event	Notes
12 October	Turin–Modena	Autodromo di Monza	Race	
12 October	Turin–Modena	Cesana–Sestriere	Hillclimb	Race cancelled
13 October	Modena–Misano Adriatico	Autodromo Dino Ferrari	Race	
13 October	Modena–Misano Adriatico	Autodromo di Misano	Race	
14 October	Misano Adriatico–Magione	S. Stefano–Passo dello Spino	Hillclimb	
14 October	Misano Adriatico–Magione	Autodromo di Magione	Race	
15 October	Magione–Orvieto	Rieti–Terminillo	Hillclimb	
15 October	Magione–Orvieto	Autodromo di Vallelunga	Race	
16 October	Orvieto–Parma	S. Giorgio–Colonnetta	Hillclimb	
16 October	Orvieto–Parma	Quercegrossa–Croce Fiorentina	Hillclimb	Race cancelled
16 October	Orvieto–Parma	Autodromo del Mugello	Race	
17 October	Parma–Turin	Autodromo di Varano	Race	
17 October	Parma–Turin	Autodromo di Casale	Race	

Podium finishers
Rank	Drivers	Team Car	Class	Time
1	(Italy) Pianta; (Italy) Scabini	(Italy) Abarth (Italy) Abarth SE 031	Gr. 5	1 h 24 m 09.9 s
2	(Italy) Coggiola; (Italy) Pilone	(Italy) Scuderia Nord Ovest (Germany) Porsche 911 Carrera RSR	Gr. 4	1 h 24 m 20.9 s
3	(Italy) Bocconi; (Italy) Lovato	(Italy) Scuderia Nettuno (Germany) Porsche 3000	Gr. 3	1 h 25 m 57.6 s

=== 1976 ===
The 4º Giro d'Italia automobilistico took place between 17 and 20 October. The race was part of the Italian Group 4 Championship, Italian Group 5 Championship. A one-make "Trofeo Alfasud" was disputed by 15 Alfa Romeo Alfasud in separate races.

Amongst the notable entrants there were two Lancia-Marlboro Stratos Turbo of Facetti/Sodano and Pinto/Bernacchini, with the "silhouette" body allowed by the newly enacted Special production cars Group 5 rules. Despite looking almost identical, the two cars were very different; Pinto's Stratos used the previous year's carburetted engine, while Facetti's one had an all-new fuel injected and intercooled engine developing about 100 PS more. Fiat sought to replicate its past year's success by entrusting Pinto another prototype 131, this time an unassuming Gr. 4 131 Rally made into a Group 5 car enlarging to 2.1-litre. Other Group 5 "silhouette" cars were Merzario's Ford Escort, Finotto's BMW-Schnitzer 2002 Turbo and Mannini's Fiat X1/9-based Dallara Icsunonove.

Facetti won with

Day	Leg	Circuit or route	Event
17 October	Turin–Monza	Cesana–Sestriere	Hillclimb
17 October	Turin–Monza	Autodromo di Casale	Race
17 October	Turin–Monza	Autodromo di Monza	Race
18 October	Monza–Misano	Autodromo di Imola	Race
18 October	Monza–Misano	Autodromo di Misano	Race
18 October	Misano–Parma	S. Stefano–Passo dello Spino	Hillclimb
18 October	Misano–Parma	Autodromo del Mugello	Race
20 October	Parma–Turin	Autodromo di Varano	Race

Podium finishers
Rank	Drivers	Team Car	Class	Time
1	(Italy) Facetti; (Italy) Sodano	(Italy) Lancia-Marlboro (Italy) Lancia Stratos Turbo "Silhouette"	Gr. 5	2 h 51 m 10.0 s
2	(Italy) Bernabei; (Italy) Borgia	(Germany) Porsche 911 RSR		2 h 57 m 48.1 s
3	(Italy) Pittoni; (Italy) Baresi	(Germany) Porsche 911 Turbo		3 h 01 m 30.6 s

=== 1977 ===
The 5º Giro d'Italia automobilistico took place between 12 and 16 June.

Day	Leg	Circuit or route	Event
12 June	Turin–Monza	Cesana–Sestriere	Hillclimb
12 June	Turin–Monza	Autodromo di Casale	Race
13 June	Monza–Misano	Autodromo di Monza	Race
13 June	Monza–Misano	Autodromo di Imola	Race
13 June	Monza–Misano	Autodromo di Misano	Race
14 June	Misano–Vallelunga	S. Stefano–Passo dello Spino	Hillclimb
14 June	Misano–Vallelunga	Autodromo di Magione	Race
14 June	Misano–Vallelunga	Rieti–Terminillo	Hillclimb
15 June	Vallelunga–Viareggio	Autodromo di Vallelunga	Race
15 June	Vallelunga–Viareggio	S. Giorgio–Colonnetta	Hillclimb
15 June	Vallelunga–Viareggio	Autodromo del Mugello	Race
16 June	Viareggio–Turin	Autodromo di Varano	Race

Podium finishers
Rank	Drivers	Team Car	Class	Time
1	(Italy) «Vittorio C.»; (Italy) Monticone	(Italy) «Victor» (Germany) Porsche 935	Gr. 5	
2	(Italy) Bianco; (Italy) «Tambauto»	(Germany) Porsche 934	Gr. 4	
3	(Italy) Pietromarchi; (Italy) Naddeo	(Italy) De Tomaso Pantera	Gr. 5	

=== 1978 ===
The 6º Giro d'Italia automobilistico took place between 13 and 18 October. It was one of ten non-World Rally Championship races that counted for the FIA Cup for Rally Drivers. The race was also part of the Italian Group 4 Championship, Italian Group 5 Championship and the one-make "Trofeo Autobianchi A112 Abarth".

Winners were Alén/Pianta/Kivimäki on a works Lancia Stratos; Pianta drove on the track, while the Alén/Kivimäki rally duo tackled the road stages. The car was a modified Group 4 rally car, classed in Group 5 as it was fitted with the 24-valve engine and other components which had lost their FIA homologation that year. Markku Alén went on to win the FIA Cup for Rally Drivers, also thanks to points scored in the Giro.

Day	Leg	Circuit or route	Event
14 October	Turin–Imola	Autodromo di Monza	Race
14 October	Turin–Imola	Autodromo di Varano	Race
15 October	Imola–Magione	Autodromo Dino Ferrari	Race
15 October	Imola–Magione	Autodromo di Misano	Race
16 October	Magione–Rieti	Rieti–Terminillo	Hillclimb
16 October	Magione–Rieti	Autodromo di Vallelunga	Race
17 October	Rieti–Il Ciocco	S. Giorgio–Colonnetta	Hillclimb
17 October	Rieti–Il Ciocco	Autodromo di Magione	Race
17 October	Rieti–Il Ciocco	S. Stefano–Passo dello Spino	Hillclimb
18 October	Il Ciocco–Turin	Ronde del Ciocco	Eight special stages

Podium finishers
Rank	Drivers	Team Car	Class	Time
1	(Finland) Alén; (Italy) Pianta; (Finland) Kivimäki	(Italy) Lancia Stratos	Gr. 5	
2	(Italy) Facetti; (Italy) Finotto; (Italy) De Antoni	(Germany) Porsche 935	Gr. 5	
3	(Italy) Magnani; (Italy) Pittoni; (Italy) Cresto	(Italy) Lancia Stratos	Gr. 4	

=== 1979 ===
The two Lancias and other entrants were disqualified, and the first prize went to third-arrived Moretti, Schön and Radaelli privateer trio.

Podium finishers
Rank	Drivers	Team Car	Class	Time
DQ	(Canada) Villeneuve (Germany) Röhrl; (Germany) Geistdörfer	(Italy) Lancia (Italy) Lancia Montecarlo Turbo	Gr. 5	3 h 49 m 46.5 s
DQ	(Italy) Patrese; (Finland) Alén; (Finland) Kivimäki	(Italy) Lancia-Alitalia (Italy) Lancia Montecarlo Turbo	Gr. 5	3 h 50 m 22.3 s
1	(Italy) Moretti (Italy) Schön; (Italy) Radaelli	(Germany) Porsche 935 TT	Gr. 5	3 h 56 m 34.9 s
2	(Italy) Bettega (Italy) De Vito; (Italy) Perissinot	(Italy) Fiat-Alitalia (Italy) Fiat Ritmo 75 Abarth	Gr. 2	4 h 7 m 6.3 s
3	(Italy) Carello (Italy) De Cesaris; (Italy) Meiohas	(Italy) Lancia Stratos	Gr. 4	4 h 7 m 44.5 s

=== 1980 ===
Podium finishers
Rank	Drivers	Team Car	Class	Time
1	(Italy) Patrese; (Finland) Alén; (Finland) Kivimäki	(Italy) Lancia Montecarlo Turbo	Gr. 5	4 h 25 m 47.1 s
2	(Italy) Alboreto; (Italy) Bettega; (Italy) Bernacchini	(Italy) Lancia Montecarlo Turbo	Gr. 5	4 h 40 m 7.6 s
3	(Italy) Pantaleoni; (Italy) Meloni; (Italy) Tedeschini	(Germany) Porsche 911 SC	Gr. 5	4 h 43 m 25.2 s

=== 1988 ===
The 9º Giro d'Italia automobilistico took place between 16 and 20 November 1988.

Day	Leg	Circuit or route	Event
16–17 November	Turin–Reggio Emilia	Bollengo	Special stage
16–17 November	Turin–Reggio Emilia	Alba	Special stage
16–17 November	Turin–Reggio Emilia	Varzi	Special stage
16–17 November	Turin–Reggio Emilia	Autodromo di Varano	Race
16–17 November	Turin–Reggio Emilia	Berceto	Special stage
16–17 November	Turin–Reggio Emilia	Ciano d'Enza	Special stage
18 November	Reggio Emilia–Misano Adriatico	Prignano	Special stage
18 November	Reggio Emilia–Misano Adriatico	Zocca	Special stage
18 November	Reggio Emilia–Misano Adriatico	Zattaglia	Special stage
18 November	Reggio Emilia–Misano Adriatico	Autodromo di Misano	Race
19 November	Misano Adriatico–Parma	Autodromo di Misano	Race
19 November	Misano Adriatico–Parma	Vergato	Special stage
19 November	Misano Adriatico–Parma	Castagneto	Special stage
19 November	Misano Adriatico–Parma	Carpineti	Special stage
20 November	Parma–Monza	Autodromo di Monza	Race
20 November	Parma–Monza	Milan trade fair	Super s. s.

Podium finishers
Rank	Drivers	Team Car	Class	Time
1	(Italy) Patrese; (Italy) Biasion; (Italy) Siviero	(Italy) Alfa Romeo (Italy) Alfa Romeo 75 Turbo IMSA	IMSA	2 h 43 m 22 s
2	(Italy) Larini; (Italy) Cerrato; (Italy) Cerri	(Italy) Alfa Romeo (Italy) Alfa Romeo 75 Turbo IMSA	IMSA	2 h 43 m 46 s
3	(Italy) Nannini; (France) Loubet; (France) Andrié	(Italy) Alfa Romeo (Italy) Alfa Romeo 75 Turbo IMSA	IMSA	2 h 44 m 13 s

=== 1989 ===
The 10º Giro d'Italia automobilistico took place between 14 and 19 November 1989. A poker of Alfa Romeo 75 IMSA took the top positions; the third classified D'Amore/Noberasco/Cianci were privateers.

Day	Leg	Circuit or route	Event
14–15 November	Turin–Castelnuovo Garfagnana	Lingotto	Super s. s.
14–15 November	Turin–Castelnuovo Garfagnana	Alba	Special stage
14–15 November	Turin–Castelnuovo Garfagnana	Canelli	Special stage
14–15 November	Turin–Castelnuovo Garfagnana	Varzi	Special stage
14–15 November	Turin–Castelnuovo Garfagnana	Autodromo di Varano	Race
14–15 November	Turin–Castelnuovo Garfagnana	Berceto	Special stage
14–15 November	Turin–Castelnuovo Garfagnana	Ciocco	Special stage
16 November	Castelnuovo Garfagnana–Rome	Ciocco	Special stage
16 November	Castelnuovo Garfagnana–Rome	Poggibonsi	Special stage
16 November	Castelnuovo Garfagnana–Rome	Campiglia d'Orcia	Special stage
16 November	Castelnuovo Garfagnana–Rome	Autodromo di Vallelunga	Race
17 November	Rome–Misano Adriatico	Fiano Romano	Special stage
17 November	Rome–Misano Adriatico	Deruta	Special stage
17 November	Rome–Misano Adriatico	San Giustino	Special stage
17 November	Rome–Misano Adriatico	Autodromo di Misano	Race
18 November	Misano Adriatico–Reggio Emilia	Autodromo di Misano	Race
18 November	Misano Adriatico–Reggio Emilia	Palazzuolo sul Senio	Special stage
18 November	Misano Adriatico–Reggio Emilia	Vergato	Special stage
18 November	Misano Adriatico–Reggio Emilia	Carpineto	Special stage
19 November	Reggio Emilia–Monza	Autodromo di Monza	Race

Podium finishers
Rank	Drivers	Team Car	Class	Time
1	(Italy) Francia; (Italy) Cerrato; (Italy) Cerri	(Italy) Alfa Romeo (Italy) Alfa Romeo 75 Turbo IMSA	IMSA	2 h 53 m 03 s
2	(Italy) Larini; (Italy) Biasion; (Italy) Siviero	(Italy) Alfa Romeo (Italy) Alfa Romeo 75 Turbo IMSA	IMSA	2 h 53 m 23 s
3	(Italy) D'Amore; (Italy) Noberasco; (Italy) Cianci	(Italy) Alfa Romeo 75 Turbo		2 h 54 m 53 s

=== 2011 ===
Day	Leg	Circuit or route	Event
26 October	Turin–Monza	Bielmonte	Special stage
26 October	Turin–Monza	Pray–Curino	Special stage
26 October	Turin–Monza	Mottarone	Special stage
27 October	Monza–Franciacorta	Autodromo di Monza	Race
27 October	Monza–Franciacorta	Val Taleggio	Special stage
27 October	Monza–Franciacorta	Colli San Fermo	Special stage
28 October	Franciacorta–Imola	Autodromo di Franciacorta	Race
28 October	Franciacorta–Imola	Castelli di Canossa	Special stage
28 October	Franciacorta–Imola	Trinità	Special stage
28 October	Franciacorta–Imola	Autodromo di Modena	SPS
29 October	Imola–Arezzo	Autodromo di Imola	Race
29 October	Imola–Arezzo	Monte Faggiola	Special stage
29 October	Imola–Arezzo	Autodromo del Mugello	Race
29 October	Imola–Arezzo	Talla	Special stage
30 October	Arezzo–Vallelunga	Magione	SPS
30 October	Arezzo–Vallelunga	Prodo–Colonnetta	Special stage
30 October	Arezzo–Vallelunga	Autodromo di Vallelunga	Race

Podium finishers
Rank	Drivers	Team Car	Class	Time
1	(Italy) Pitorri; (Italy) Gagliardini; (Italy) Bernardini	(Italy) Star Cars (Italy) Porsche Cayman S CSAI GT4	GTT	3 h 9 m 8.327 s
2	(Italy) Forato; (Italy) Bianco; (Italy) Gasparotto	(Italy) Rubicone Corse (Italy) Lamborghini Gallardo	GT	3 h 10 m 32.053 s
3	(Italy) Vallini; (Italy) Fraschia; (Italy) Fraschia	(Italy) PCR Sport (Italy) SEAT León Supercopa	T	3h 13 m 41.472 s

== Overall winners ==
Year	Driver(s) and co-driver	Car
1901	(Italy) Felice Nazzaro	Fiat 8 HP
1902–1972: not held
1973	(Italy) Mario Casoni; (Italy) Raffaele Minganti	De Tomaso Pantera
1974	(France) Jean-Claude Andruet; (France) "Biche"	Lancia Stratos Turbo
1975	(Italy) Giorgio Pianta; (Italy) Bruno Scabini	Abarth SE 031
1976	(Italy) Carlo Facetti; (Italy) Piero Sodano	Lancia Stratos Turbo
1977	(Italy) «Vittorio C.»; (Italy) Piero Monticone	Porsche 935
1978	(Finland) Markku Alén; (Italy) Giorgio Pianta; (Finland) Ilkka Kivimäki	Lancia Stratos
1979	(Italy) Gianpiero Moretti; (Italy) Giorgio Schön; (Italy) Emilio Radaelli	Porsche 935 TT
1980	(Italy) Riccardo Patrese; (Finland) Markku Alén; (Finland) Ilkka Kivimäki	Lancia Montecarlo Turbo
1981–1987: not held
1988	(Italy) Riccardo Patrese; (Italy) Miki Biasion; (Italy) Tiziano Siviero	Alfa Romeo 75 Turbo IMSA
1989	(Italy) Giorgio Francia; (Italy) Dario Cerrato; (Italy) Giuseppe Cerri	Alfa Romeo 75 Turbo IMSA
1990–2010: not held
2011	(Italy) Maurizio Pitorri; (Italy) Andrea Gagliardini; (Italy) Mara Bernardini	Porsche Cayman S GT4
2012–present: not held

== See also ==
- Tour de France Automobile
