= Lancia Montecarlo =

Italian sports coupé

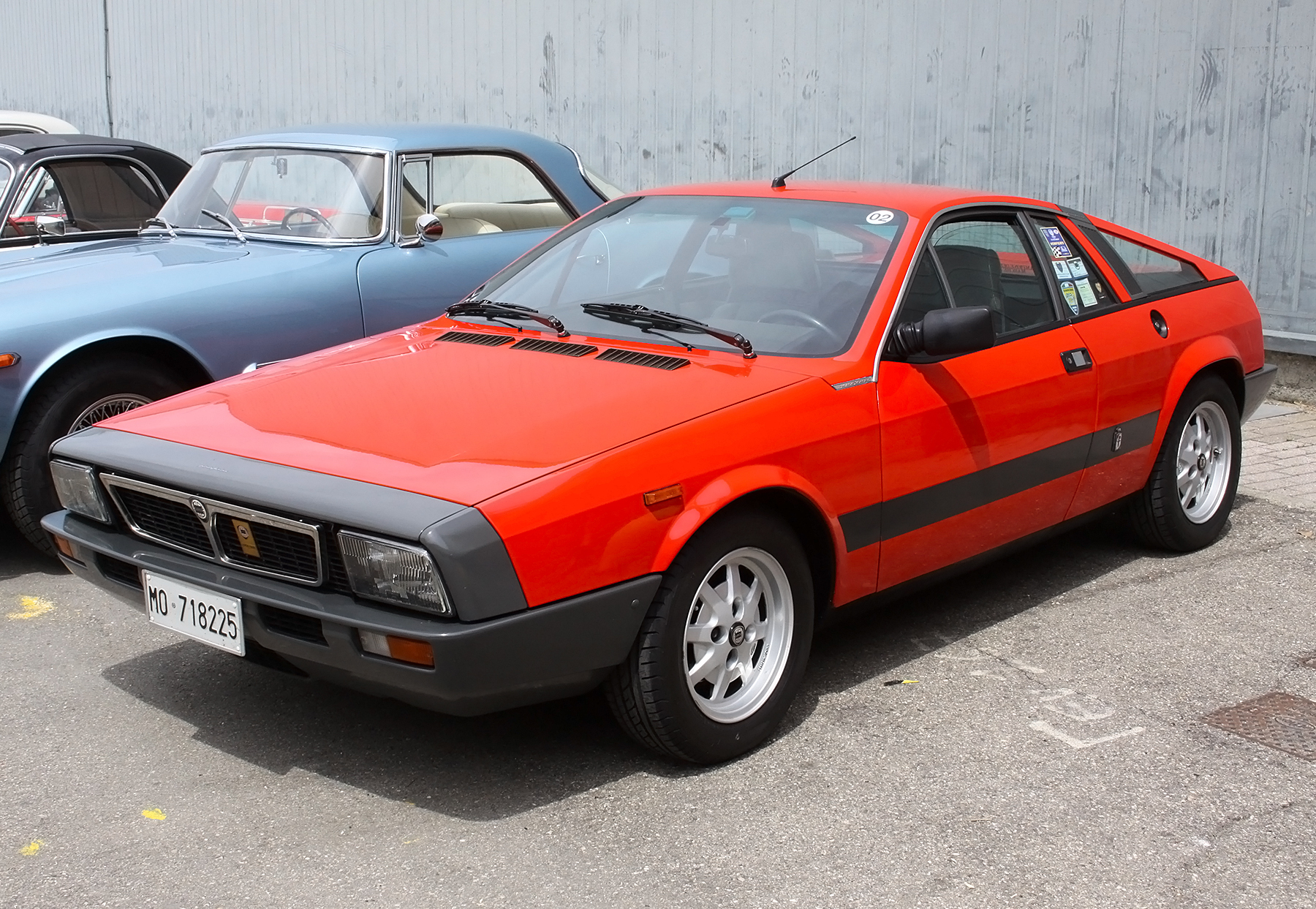
- Lancia Montecarlo (1980–1981)

Overview
- Manufacturer: Lancia
- Also called: Lancia Beta Montecarlo; Lancia Scorpion (U.S)
- Production: 1975–1978 and 1980–1981
- Assembly: Italy: Grugliasco, Turin (Pininfarina plant)
- Designer: Paolo Martin at Pininfarina

Body and chassis
- Class: Sports car (S)
- Body style: 2-door coupé 2-door cabrio Spider
- Layout: Transverse rear mid-engine, rear-wheel-drive
- Related: Lancia 037; Abarth SE 030; Lancia Medusa

Powertrain
- Engine: 2.0 L Lampredi I4; 1.8 L Lampredi I4 (North America)
- Transmission: 5-speed manual

Dimensions
- Wheelbase: 2,300 mm (90.6 in)
- Length: 3,813 mm (150.1 in)
- Width: 1,696 mm (66.8 in)
- Height: 1,190 mm (46.9 in)
- Kerb weight: 970–1,040 kg (2,138–2,293 lb)

The Lancia Montecarlo is a two-seater sports car manufactured and marketed by Lancia from 1975 to 1981, across two series. Designated the Tipo 137, it was designed by Pininfarina and has a mid-engine, rear-wheel-drive layout. The car is named to commemorate Lancia's earlier wins in the Monte Carlo Rally.

The Series 1 cars (1975–1978) were marketed as the Lancia Beta Montecarlo and the Series 2 (1980–1981) as the Lancia Montecarlo. In both cases Montecarlo was spelled as one word, unlike the city of Monte Carlo. In some of its earliest promotional material, Lancia used the form "Monte-Carlo".

Both series were offered in fixed head coupé and open-roof cabrio bodystyles, the latter of which was called the Spider and features a large patented retractable canvas roof between solid A and B pillars. A modified version of the Spider was marketed in the United States as the Lancia Scorpion for the 1976–1977 model years.

== History ==
In the late 1960s and early 1970s, Fiat began planning to replace the aging coupé and spider versions of their 850 and 124 lines. They evaluated mid-engine proposals from two of Italy's large design houses. Bertone presented a mid-engined design based loosely on their Autobianchi A112 Runabout, which went into production as the Fiat X1/9. Pininfarina proposed a slightly larger mid-engined sports car given the development name X1/8 with a 3-litre V6 motor. Pininfarina expected that the X1/8 would be the first car wholly developed and built in-house, rather than being based on an existing platform. Initial work was done by 1969, and a final design by Paolo Martin was completed in 1971.

Although Pininfarina's X1/8 design was not immediately accepted, work on it continued. During the first oil crisis in the 1970s, the project was renamed "X1/20", and the V6 was changed to a 2-litre four-cylinder engine. The production X1/20, now called the Montecarlo, was given to Lancia, as a premium alternative to Fiat's X1/9.

The Montecarlo got the new 2.0-litre twin-cam four-cylinder motor from the 124 Sport Coupé, MacPherson strut suspension, a five-speed gearbox, and disc brakes front and rear. Since it shared very few components with the other Lancia Beta models, Pininfarina was chosen to build the car in its entirety.

== Models ==
=== Series 1 ===
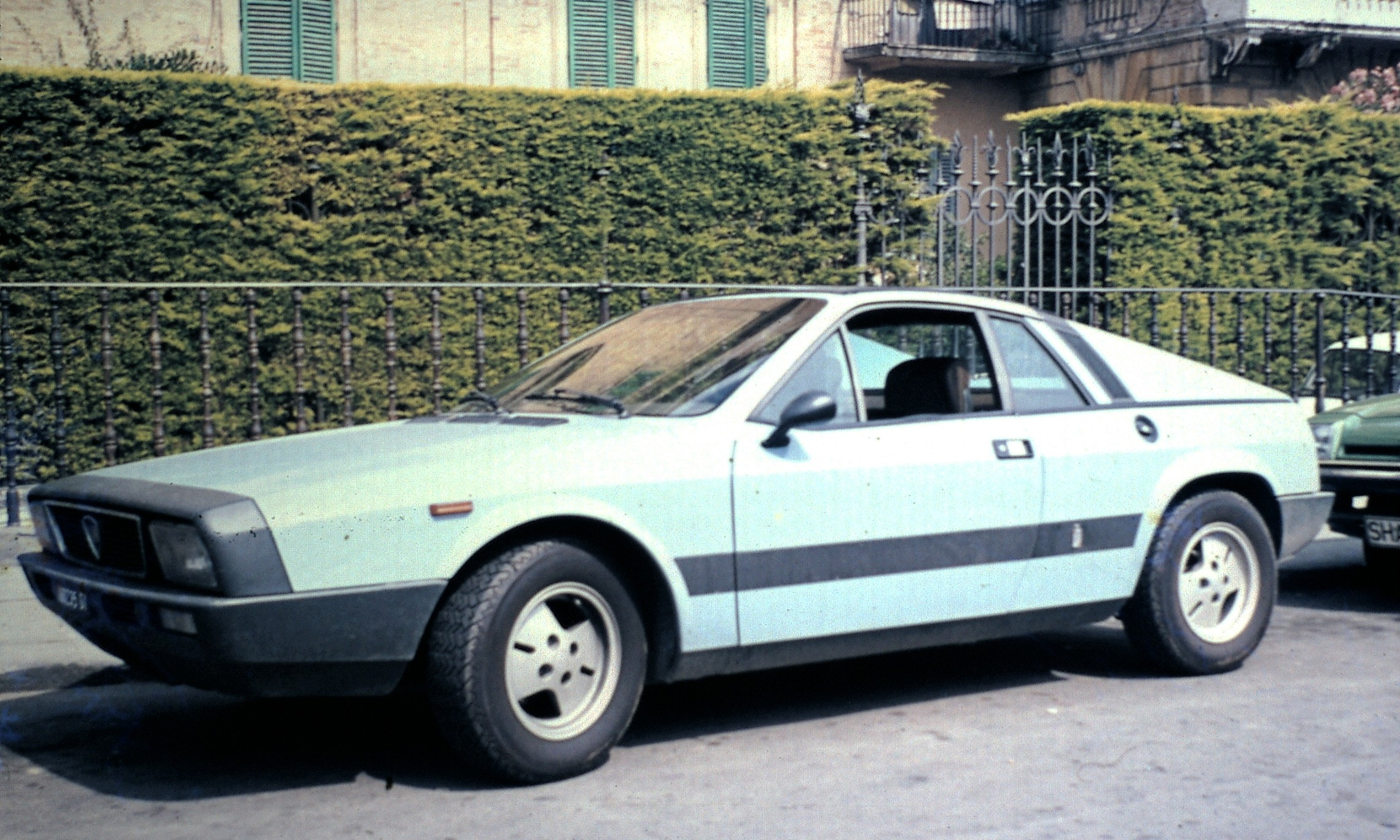
Series 1 Beta Montecarlo

The finished car was unveiled at the 45th Geneva Salon International de l'Auto in March 1975, marketed as the Lancia Beta Montecarlo. Power came from a Tipo 134.AS.000 twin cam, 2.0 L Lampredi inline four, developing 120 PS (88 kW; 118 hp) at 6000 rpm and 126 lb⋅ft (171 N⋅m) of torque at 3400 rpm. Lancia claimed a top speed of over 190 km/h (118 mph) and a 0–100 km/h (0–62 mph) acceleration time of 9.3 seconds.

Two badges were mounted low on the rear of the car, with the one on the left reading "Lancia β", and the one on the right "Montecarlo". Series 1 cars featured 5.5Jx13 "bow-tie" alloy wheels. Very early production models had solid rear wing panels above the engine bay, although these were glazed for most of the S1 production. The interior was upholstered in vinyl (TVE, Elasticized Vinylic Textile), with cloth optional. The exterior mirrors were Vitaloni Californians; standard on the driver's side, optional on the passenger's.

In 1978, production of the Beta Montecarlo went on hiatus.

=== Lancia Scorpion ===
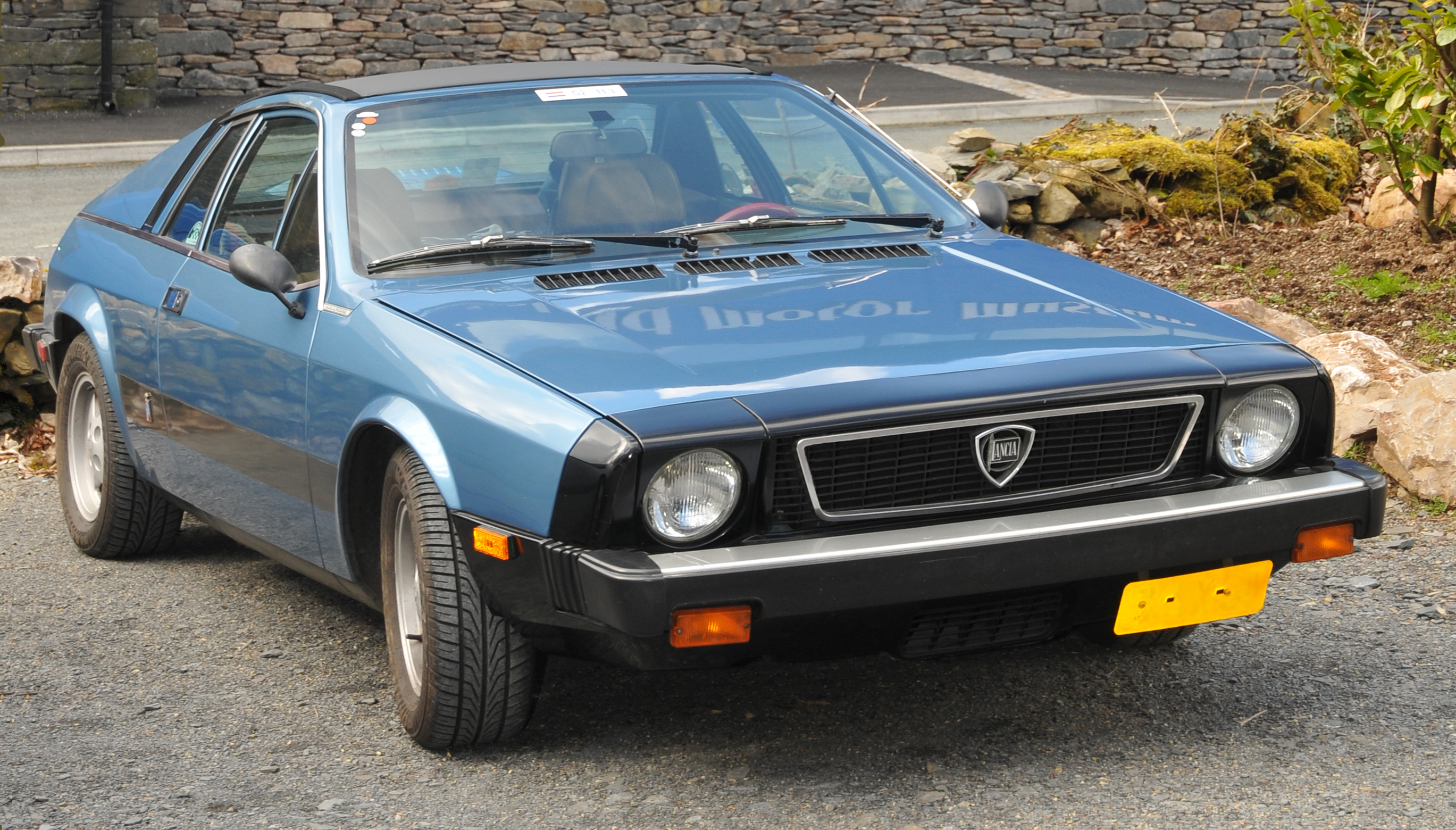
1976 Scorpion

The cabrio version of the Montecarlo was federalized and sold in North America from 1976–1977 as the Lancia Scorpion, to avoid a name conflict with the Chevrolet Monte Carlo. Text on the right-rear badge read "Scorpion", while the left-rear badge text was unchanged from the Montecarlo, although Lancia did not use the Greek letter in their promotional material.

To comply with U.S. emission regulations, a 1.8 L Tipo 134AS.031.6 twin cam engine was adapted for the car. With less aggressive camshaft profiles, a smaller carburetor, and a compression ratio reduced to 8.0:1, the Scorpion delivered 81 hp (60 kW). To meet crash test and lighting requirements, the Scorpion had large 5-mph bumpers and low-rise pop-up, sealed beam headlights, adding some 130 lb (59 kg) to the curb weight. Two additional series of vents on the engine cover were required to cool the catalyst.

=== Series 2 ===
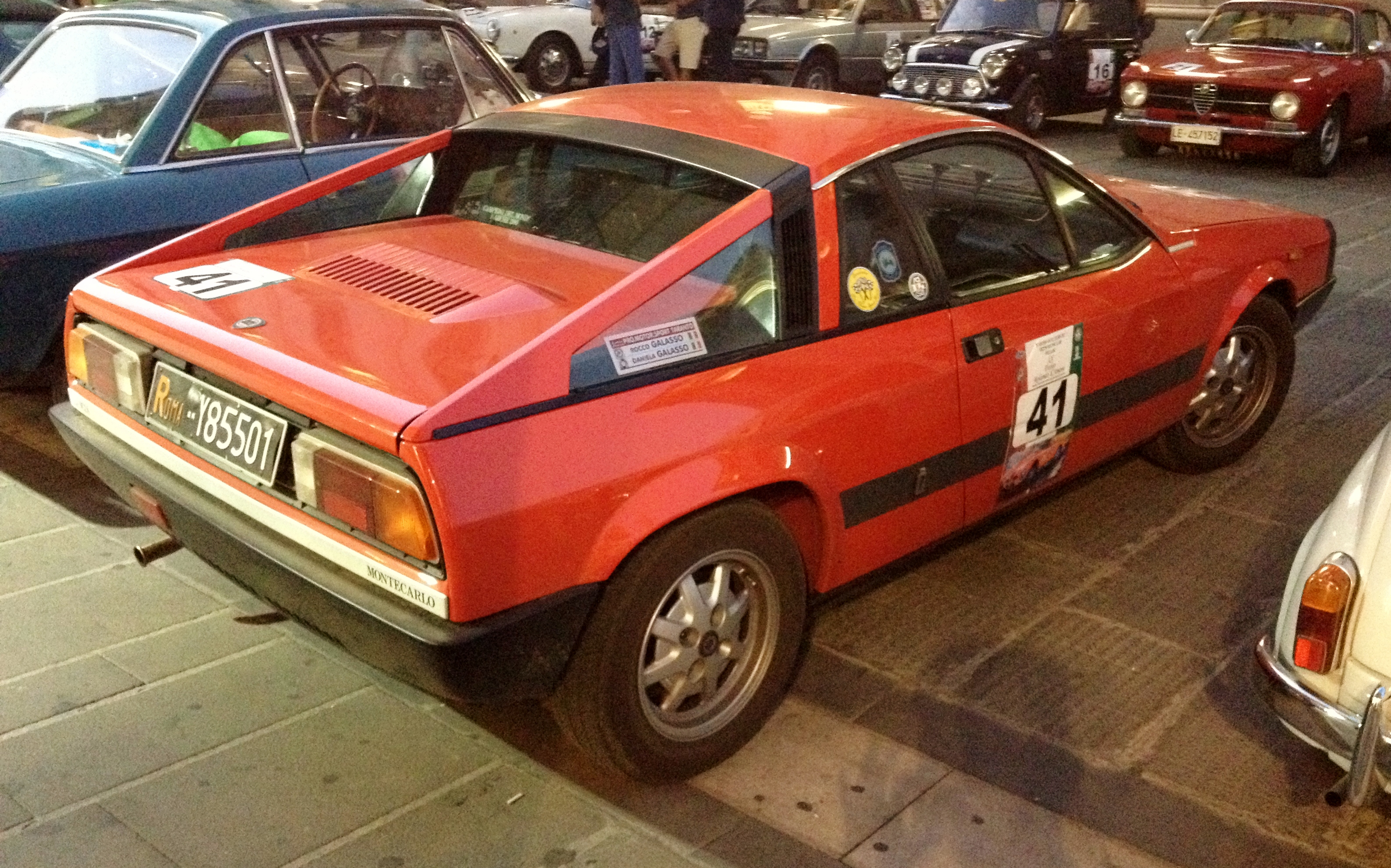
Montecarlo with revised buttresses, 14 inch alloy wheels, new badging

After a two-year hiatus the revised S2 was introduced in 1980. The Beta prefix was dropped, and the car was marketed simply as the Lancia Montecarlo.

Exterior changes included a corporate split grille design introduced with the 1979 Delta, glazed rear buttresses for better visibility and, in place of the model badging on the tail, a full-width brushed aluminium strip. Larger eight-spoke 5.5Jx14 alloy wheels visually similar to those on other Betas were adopted to clear the upsized brake rotors and calipers, and the brake servo was removed to address a brake lockup issue. The interior received a three spoke Momo steering wheel as well as revised trim and fabrics. The engine featured a higher compression ratio, Marelli electronic ignition and new carburettor.

== Production ==
Production ran from October 1974 to September 1981, with a hiatus in 1979, and reached 7,798 total. 3,558 Series 1 (S1) and 817 Series 2 (S2) Spider models were built, along with 2,080 S1 and 1,123 S2 coupés. 1,805 Lancia Scorpions were manufactured in 1976 and sold as model year 1976 and 1977 (1396 and 405 respectively). In addition to these, 11 Group 5 Montecarlo Turbo cars were built, and 220 Group B Lancia Rally 037s. Group B required an additional 20 example of each of the subsequent Evo 1 and Evo 2 037 models.

Beta Montecarlo annual production
Model	1974	1975	1976	1977	1978	1979	1980	1981	1982	Totals
Coupé	0	412	900	740	28	0	671	452	0	3,203
Spider	2	772	2,279	478	27	0	437	380	0	4,375
Totals	2	1,184	3,179	1,218	55	0	1,108	832	0	7,798

== Technical data ==
Lancia Montecarlo technical summary
Feature	Beta Montecarlo (S1)	Montecarlo (S2)	Beta Scorpion
Body and chassis:	Steel body on steel unibody chassis		
Length: Width: Height: Wheelbase:	3,813 mm (150.1 in); 1,696 mm (66.8 in); 1,190 mm (46.9 in); 2,300 mm (90.6 in)		3,965 mm (156.1 in); 1,696 mm (66.8 in); 1,190 mm (46.9 in); 2,300 mm (90.6 in)
Track f/r:	1,412 / 1,456 mm (55.6 / 57.3 in)	1,422 / 1,466 mm (56.0 / 57.7 in)	1,412 / 1,456 mm (55.6 / 57.3 in)
Weight:	1,040 kg (2,293 lb)	970 kg (2,138 lb)	1,075 kg (2,370 lb)
Layout:	Transverse rear mid-engine, rear-wheel-drive layout		
Engine:	Fiat Twin Cam straight-four engine		
Bore x stroke:	84 mm × 90 mm (3.31 in × 3.54 in)		84 mm × 79.2 mm (3.3 in × 3.1 in)
Displacement:	2.0 L (1,995 cc; 121.7 cu in)		1.8 L (1,756 cc; 107.2 cu in)
Valvetrain:	Belt-driven DOHC, two valves per cylinder		
Carburettor:	Weber 34DATR2/200	Weber 34DATR4/250	Weber 32DATRA9/101
Compression ratio:	8.9:1	9.35:1	8.0:1
Peak power:	120 hp (89 kW) at 6000 rpm		81 hp (60 kW) at 5900 rpm
Peak torque:	16.8 kg⋅m (164.8 N⋅m; 121.5 lbf⋅ft) at 3,400 rpm	17.4 kg⋅m (170.6 N⋅m; 125.9 lbf⋅ft) at 3,400 rpm	12.3 kg⋅m (121 N⋅m; 89 lbf⋅ft) at 3,200 rpm
Lubrication:	Wet sump		
Cooling:	Water cooled, pump and radiator		
Transmission:	5-speed manual, plus reverse		
Gear ratios:	First — 3.750:1; Second — 2.235:1; Third — 1.522:1; Fourth — 1.152:1; Fifth — 0.925:1; Reverse — 3.071:1		
Clutch:	Single dry plate		
Final drive ratio:	3.714:1		3.928:1
Steering:	Rack and pinion steering, 3½ turns lock-to-lock		
Front suspension:	Lower lateral arm, coil spring-over-strut, anti-roll bar as compliance link		
Rear suspension:	Wide lower wishbones, coil-over-strut, adjustable rear toe-links		
Brakes f/r:	227 mm (8.9 in) discs / 227 mm (8.9 in) discs	251 mm (9.9 in) discs / 251 mm (9.9 in) discs	227 mm (8.9 in) discs / 227 mm (8.9 in) discs
Wheels:	5½ J x 13	5½ J x 14	5½ J x 13
Tyres:	185/70 HR13	185/65 HR14	185/70 SR13

== Issues ==
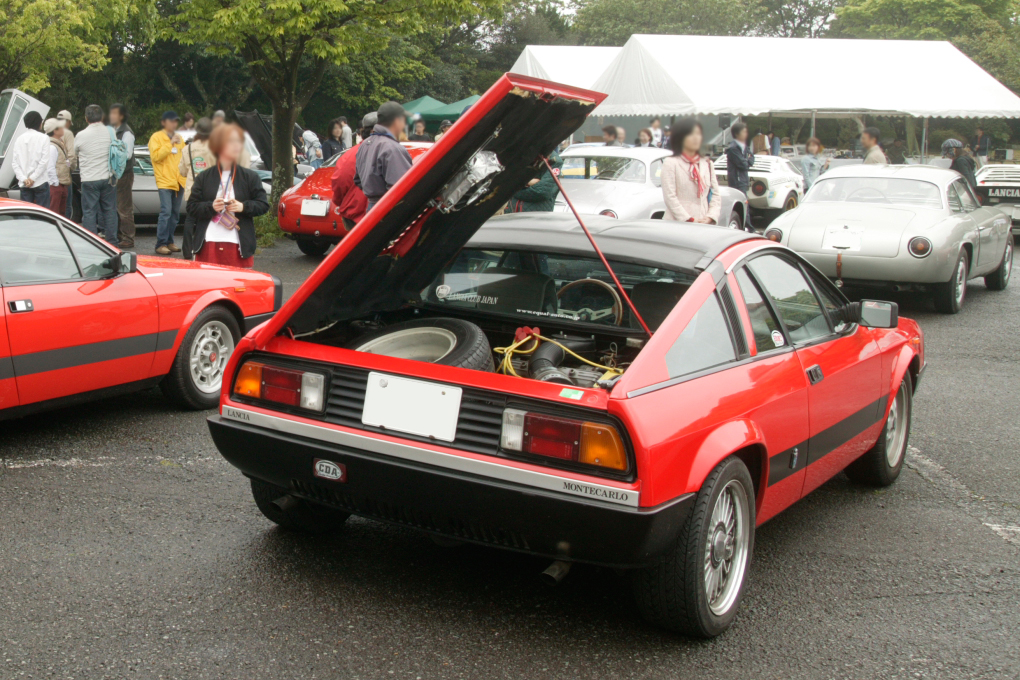
Rear view

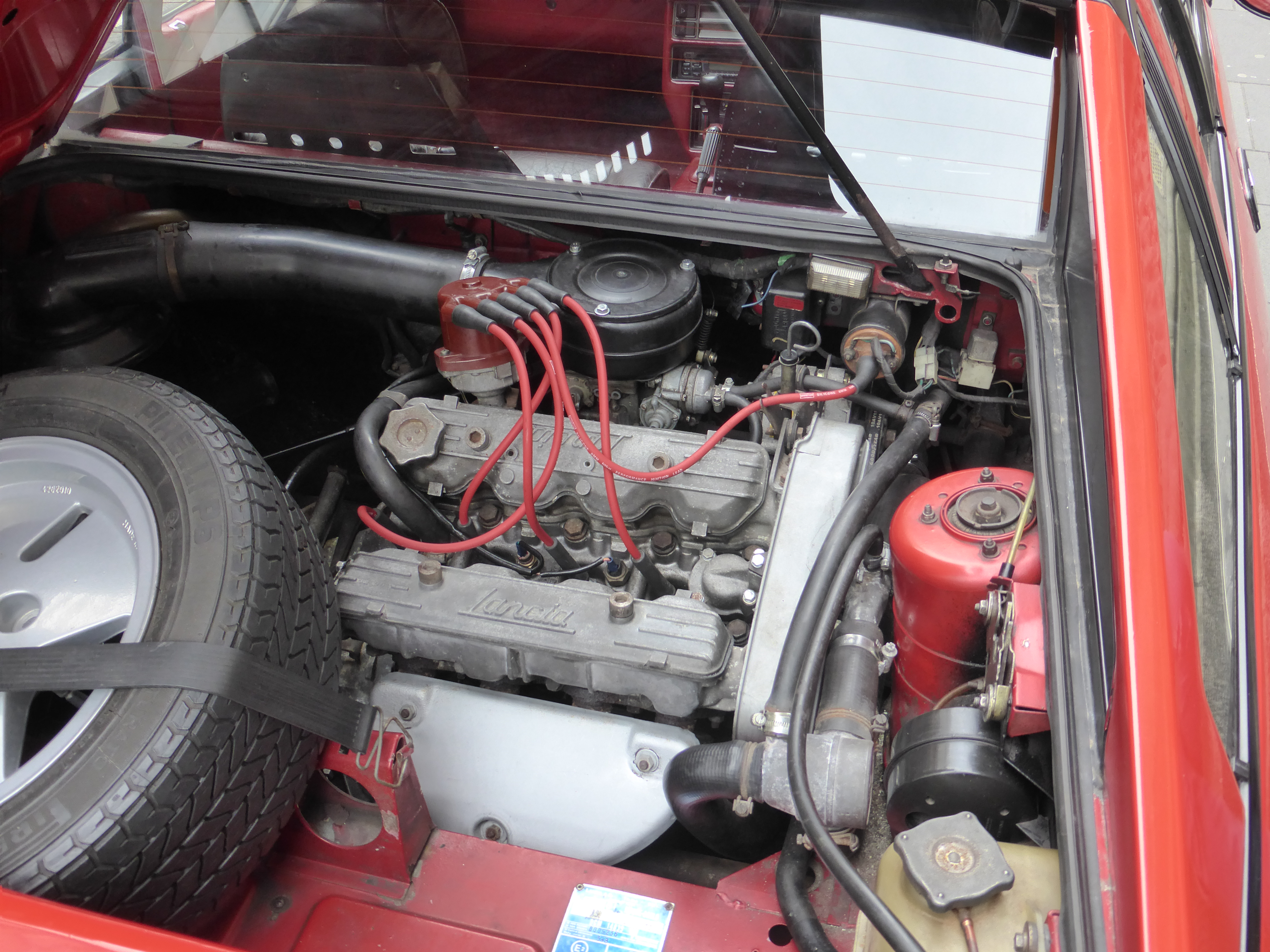
Engine bay

Engine noise was criticized; Road & Track listed noise as one of their biggest complaints, reporting "little joy listening to the wheeze of an emission equipment-stifled 4-banger", and Motor called the engine noise a "raucous cacophony".

Harsh shifting is common and increases as the bushings wear (a common trait in mid-engined cars). The metal used in the rear crossmember was too thin, making it susceptible to corrosion and eventual failure. Stronger replacement crossmembers are available from aftermarket companies.

Series 1 cars suffered from poor brake balance. With a power brake servo only acting on the front brakes, they were prone to lock up. Road & Track complained of "severe front locking and 37% fade" and Motor found "it disconcertingly easy to lock up the front wheels when approaching corners". The brakes were Fiat 124 discs all round, with relatively small solid rotors and a single piston sliding caliper. Although effective on first application, they suffered from brake fade when overheated and required regular maintenance to keep them sliding evenly. During the car's production hiatus, the braking system was reengineeried by removing the brake servo and adding larger rotors all around.

Rust is an issue for the Montecarlo and Scorpion. Unless kept in a dry environment, active prevention is required to fend off rust. The firewall and wheel wells are common locations for rust. Rusted floor pans are a major cause of early Montecarlo/Scorpion demise.

The handling of the Scorpion suffered due to the taller springs used to meet the US height requirements, a lack of caster, and bump steer.

== Motorsports ==
=== Abarth SE 030 ===
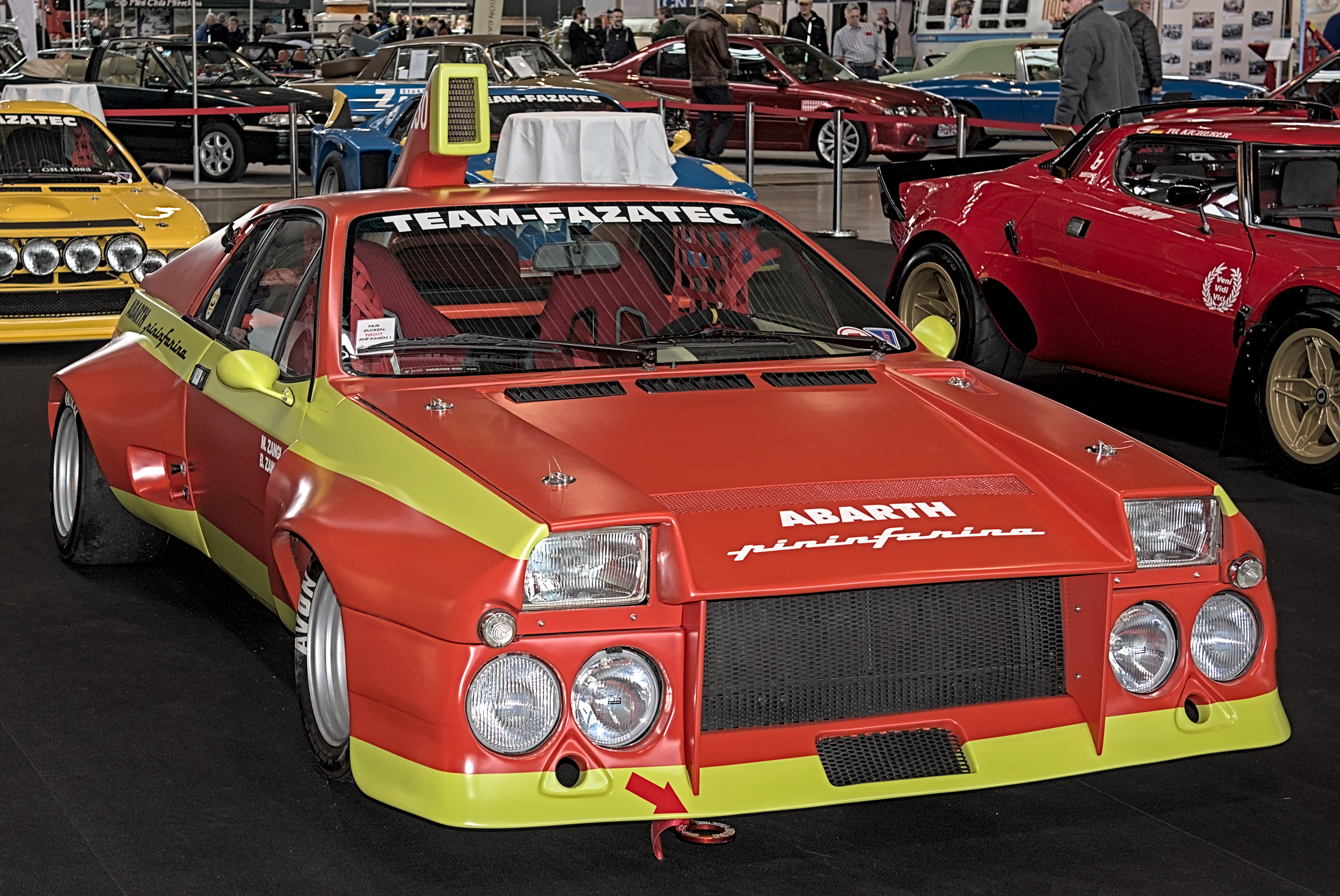
Abarth SE 030

Fiat directed Pininfarina to supply two prototype X1/20 steel chassis to Abarth. One chassis became Abarth project SE 029, and was built into a road car and development mule.

The other chassis became Abarth project SE 030, and was built as a replacement for the 124 Abarth race car. SE 030 was powered by a version of the Lampredi-designed SOHC Fiat Tipo 130B V6 engine from the Fiat 130 that had been a candidate for the original X1/8. The V6 was tuned to produce 285 hp in the Abarth.

Abarth removed the original bodywork and replaced it with one having shorter overhangs and a bonnet that was considerably lower in front, leaving the rectangular headlamps in front wings now much higher than the bonnet. Below the headlamps on each side were two additional spotlamps. The car's track was greatly widened, necessitating the addition of wide fender flares. Over the engine bay, a large intake snorkel rose above the roof. SE 030 was finished in Abarth's signature red-yellow livery.

In 1974, the SE 030 took part in the Giro d'Italia automobilistico, a championship consisting of both road and track races. Driven by Giorgio Pianta and Christine Beckers it scored a remarkable second place, just behind the Lancia Stratos Turbo of the Andruet-"Biche" team.

Ultimately, for marketing reasons Fiat opted to race the Abarth SE 031 based on the popular and easily recognized Fiat 131, and only one Abarth 030 was ever built.

=== Montecarlo Turbo ===
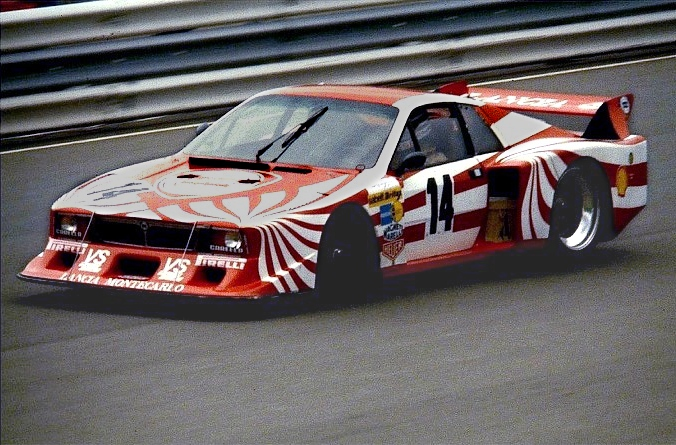
Group 5 Lancia Beta Montecarlo Turbo competing in the 1980 World Championship for Makes.

The Montecarlo Turbo is a Group 5 racer. When it entered the May 1979 Silverstone Six-Hours race, it became the first racing car fielded by Lancia in eight years. It won the 1979 World Championship for Makes (under 2-litre division) and overall for 1980 World Championship for Makes and 1981 World Endurance Championship for Makes. Hans Heyer also won the Deutsche Rennsport Meisterschaft in 1980 at the wheel of a Montecarlo. In 1980 the Turbo also placed first and second in that year's Giro d'Italia automobilistico.

Being a silhouette car, the Montecarlo Turbo only shared the centre section of the body with its namesake production car. Front and rear tubular subframes supported the suspension and housed the engine, still mid-mounted with Colotti gearbox. Three engines were used: 440 hp 1,425.9 cc, 490 hp 1,429.4 cc and 490 hp 1,773.0 cc.

=== Rally 037 ===
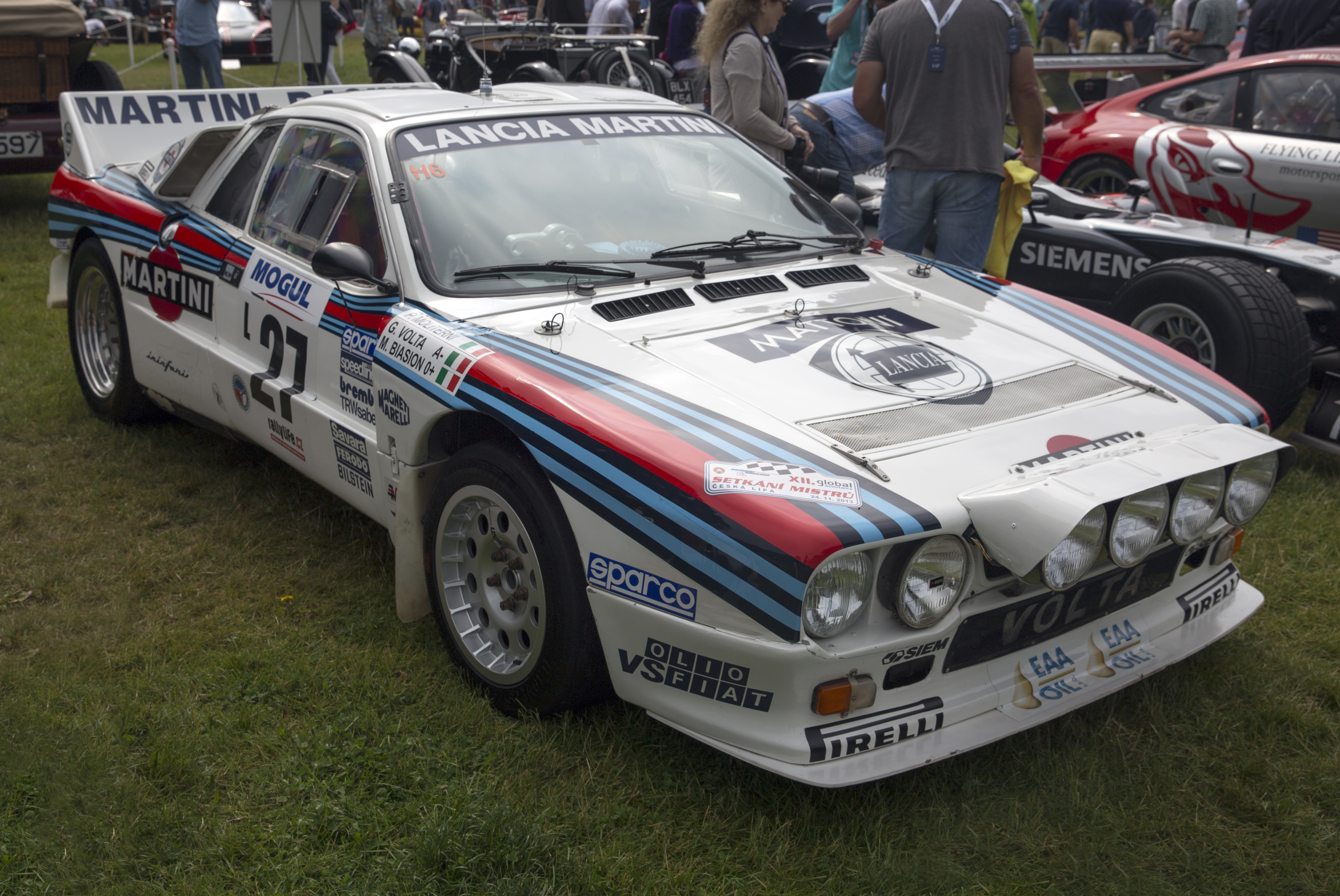
1983 Lancia Rally 037 Evo2

The Montecarlo Spider was the basis for the successful Lancia Rally 037 Group B rally car. Debuting in 1982, the car won the 1983 WRC Manufacturers' Championship for Lancia.

Like the Montecarlo Turbo, the 037 used the centre section from the Montecarlo with new front and rear subframes of steel tube. Unlike the production car or Group 5 racer, the 037's supercharged engine was mounted longitudinally rather than transversely.

== In popular culture ==
- A Lancia Scorpion appeared in Disney’s Herbie Goes to Monte Carlo (1977) as Herbie's girlfriend Giselle.

== Gallery ==
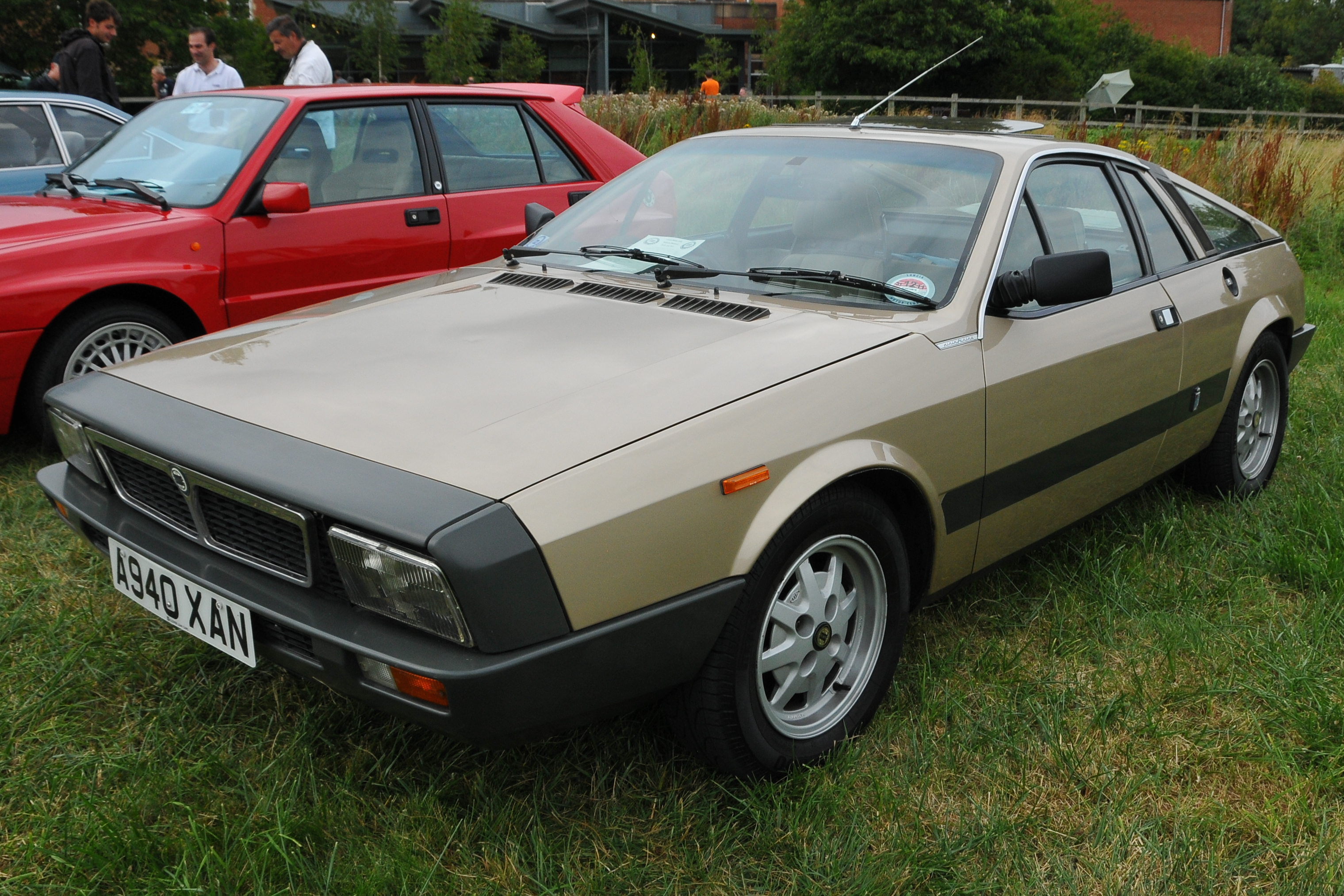
Series 2 Montecarlo with revised grille

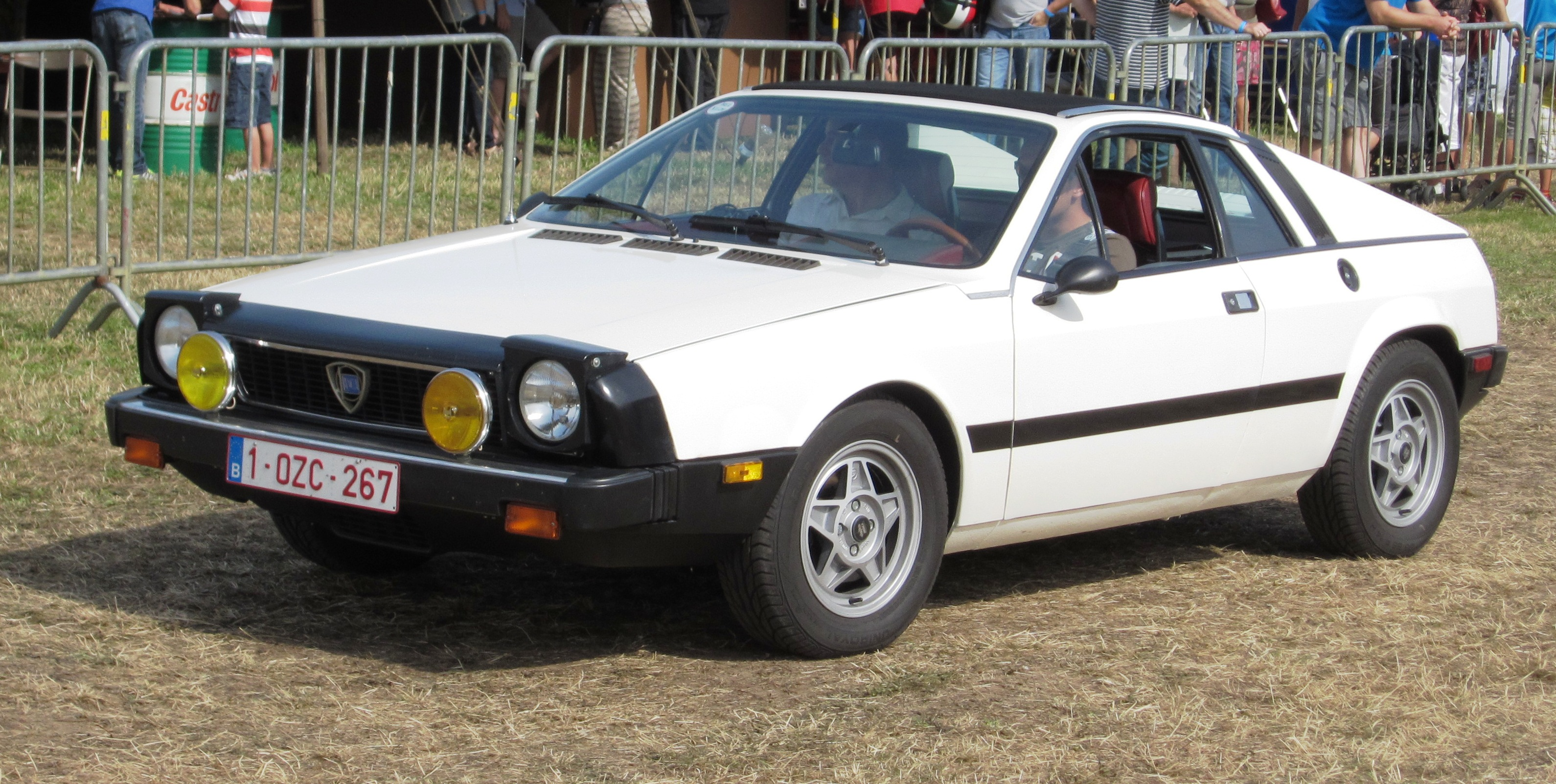
Lancia Scorpion

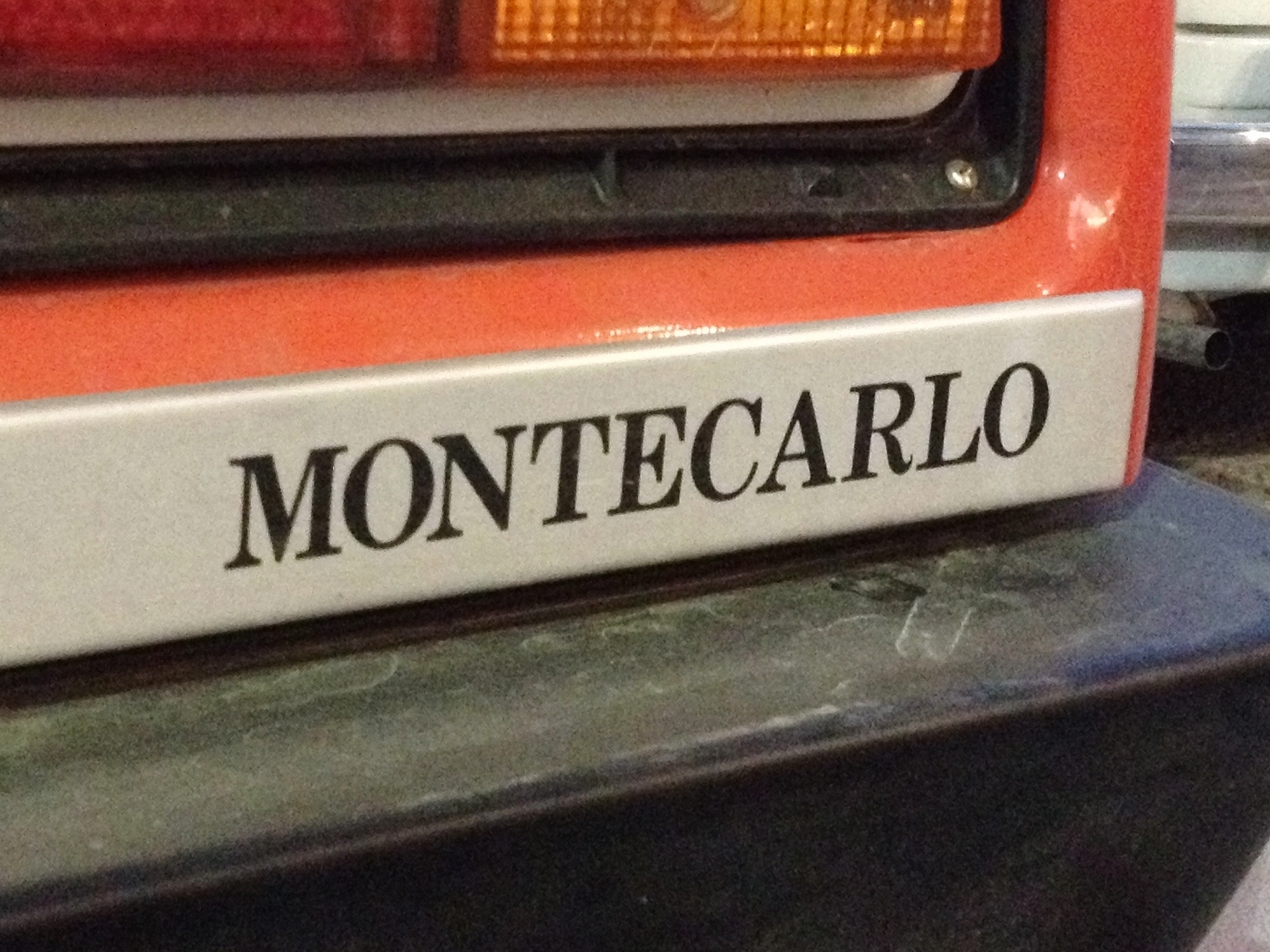
Series 2 right-rear Montecarlo Badge

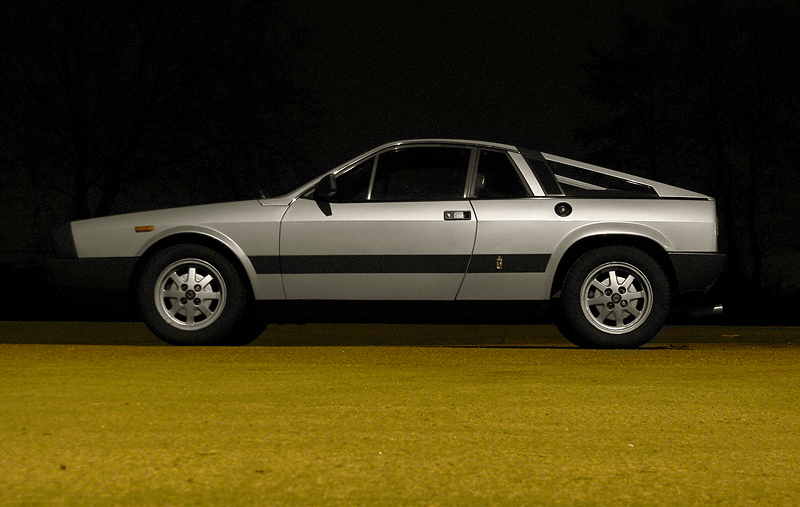
Side elevation view

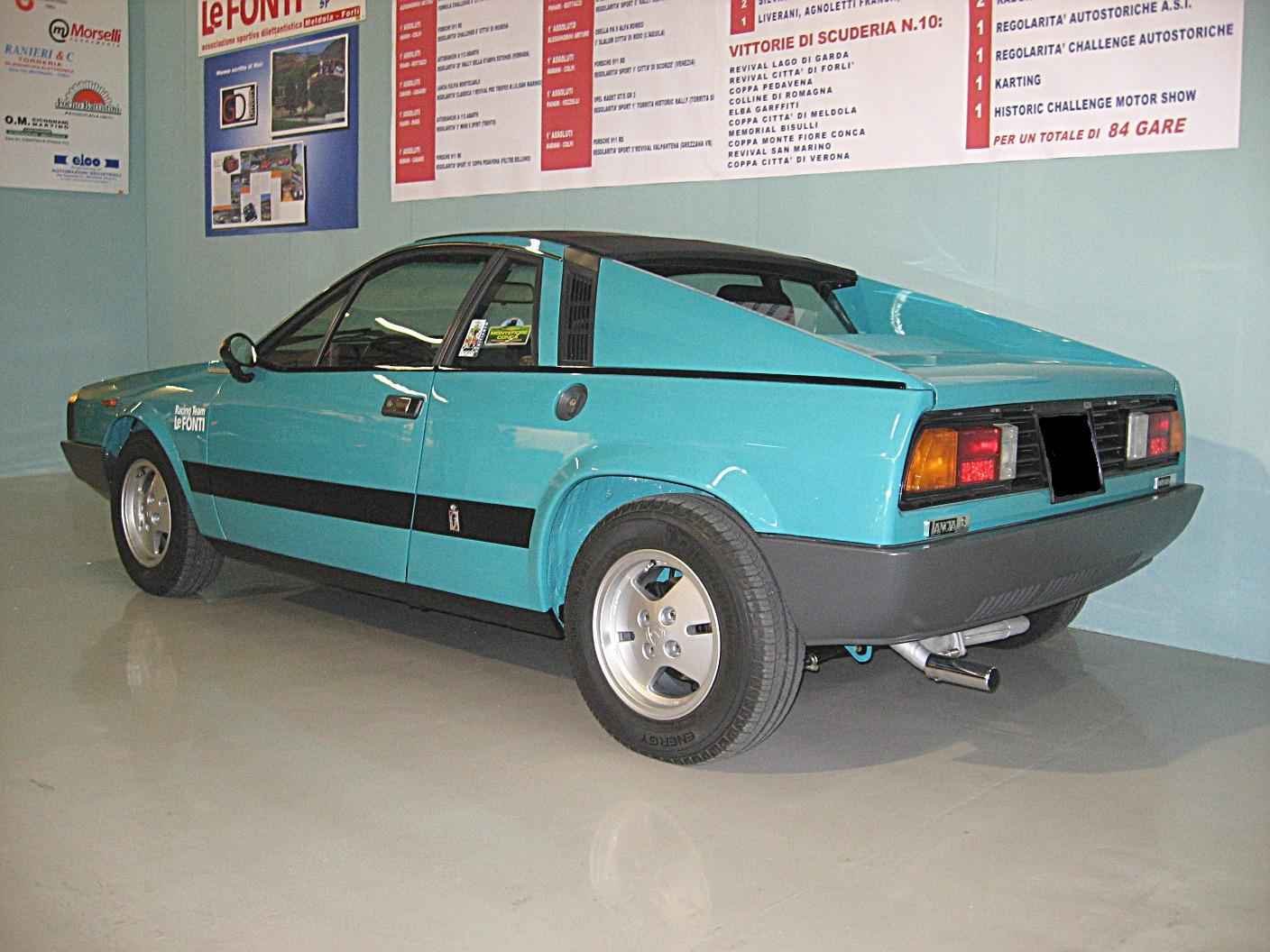
1977 Series 1 Beta Montecarlo Spider with solid buttresses

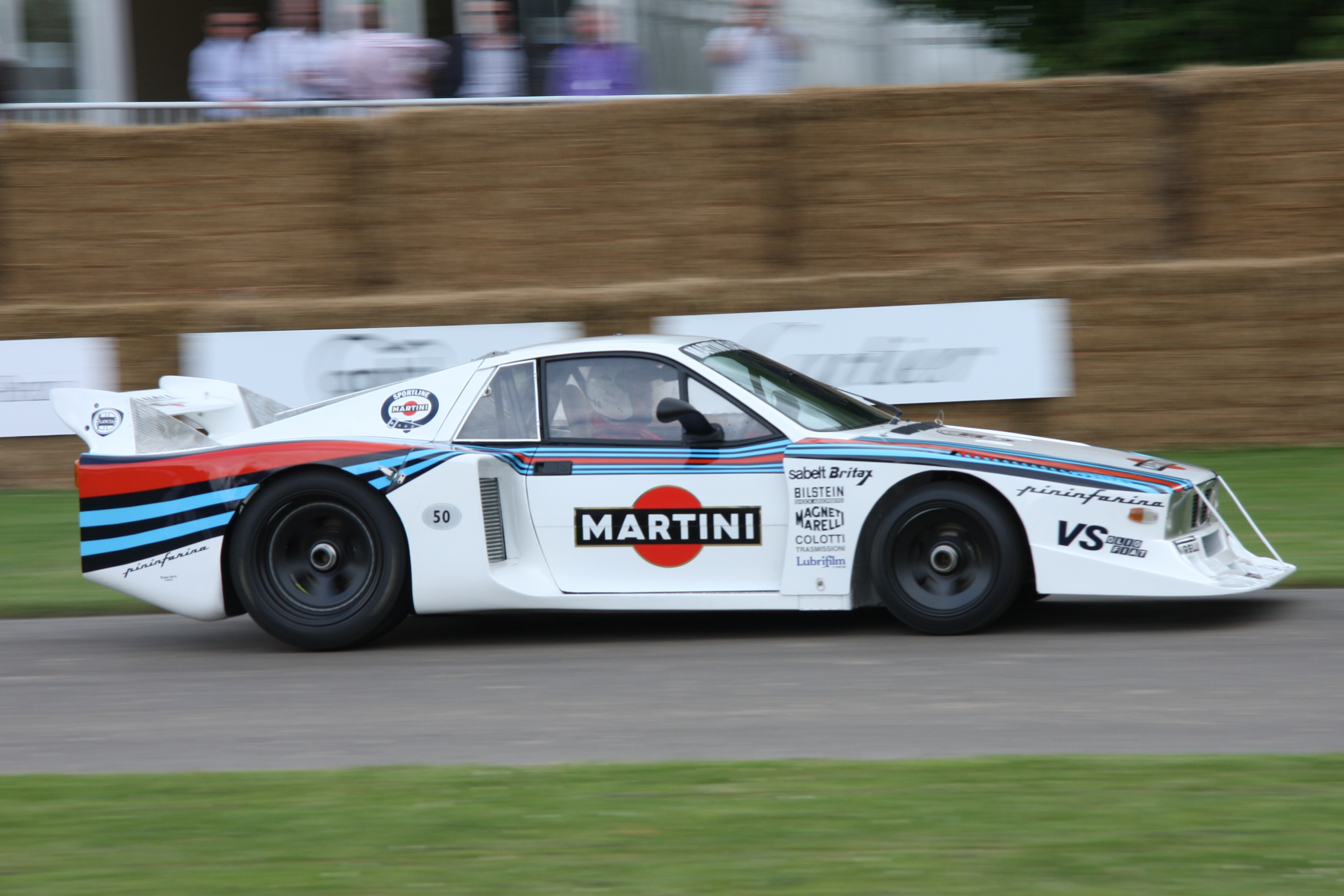
Group 5 Lancia Montecarlo Turbo

== Lancia Medusa ==
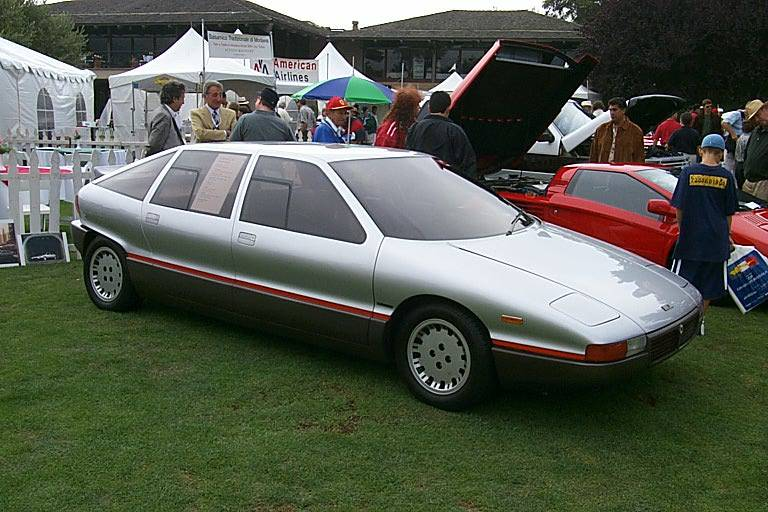
Lancia Medusa

In 1980, Italian carrozzeria Italdesign debuted their Medusa styling exercise at that year's Turin Motor Show. Designed by company founder Giorgetto Giugiaro, the Medusa was based on the chassis of a Lancia Montecarlo, and kept the Lancia's four-cylinder Twin Cam engine and transverse rear-mid engine layout.

Giugiaro's goal with the Medusa was to produce a practical four-door saloon with the lowest possible drag coefficient. The earliest version of the car had a $\scriptstyle C_\mathrm d\,$ of 0.255. This rose to 0.263 after necessary items such as wing mirrors, radiator, turn indicators, and ventilation system were added.
