= 2015 Rallye du Var =

2015 Rallye du Var: 61. Rallye du Var
- Host country: France
- Rally base: Var
- Dates run: 27 – 29 November 2015
- Stages: 14
- Stage surface: Asphalt
- Overall distance: 217.72 km (135.28 miles)

Statistics
- Crews: 178 at start, 113 at finish

Overall results
- Overall winner: (France) David Salanon (France) Romain Roche; Ford Fiesta RS WRC

The 2015 Rallye du Var was the 61st running of the annual Rallye du Var.

Last year's winner Sébastien Loeb didn't return, as he had left Citroën in 2015 and was busy preparing for his Dakar Rally debut in 2016, so David Salanon, the man who was runner up behind the nine times World Rally Champion last year, took this as an advantage and won Rallye du Var for the first time having led throughout. He defeated Quentin Gilbert and Pierre Roche, with Gilbert having not long ago clinched the titles in WRC3 and JWRC. On the entry list was 178 cars, including three Porsche RGT entries: the 996 of Raphaël Astier and the Caymans of Olivier Ponthieu and Alain Fraissard. On the first day, the Frenchman David Salanon made a giant killing act and won the first two stages, as well as seven in a row later on to create a lead that was not to be surpassed. He never put a foot wrong as his Fiesta RS finished every stage in the top six. When Pierre Roché won two stages he seemed a likely contender for the win but could never catch Salanon and was eventually third. Salanon brought Ford back to winning ways as a result, thus continuing their tradition of winning Rallye du Var in odd-numbered years. As for Quentin Gilbert, the newly crowned WRC3 and JWRC champion just about made it into second by winning the last stage.

== Rally results ==
Pos.	No.	Driver	Car	Time/Retired
1	2	(France) David Salanon	Ford Fiesta RS WRC	2:19:05.6
2	10	(France) Quentin Gilbert	Citroën DS3 R5	+1:39.8
3	1	(France) Pierre Roché	Mini Cooper WRC	+1:42.0
4	11	(Belgium) Freddy Loix	Škoda Fabia R5	+2:01.0
5	9	(France) Marc Amourette	Citroën DS3 R5	+2:50.6
6	16	(France) Sylvain Michel	Peugeot 208 S2000	+3:34.9
7	7	(France) Jean-Matthieu Leandri	Peugeot 208 T16	+4:51.6
8	14	(Switzerland) Jonathan Hirschi	Peugeot 208 T16	+5:29.2
9	15	(France) Jean-Michel Raoux	Škoda Fabia R5	+7:26.7
10	29	(France) Emmanuel Guigou	Renault Clio RS R3T	+8:09.1
