= Tour de France Automobile =

Motor racing

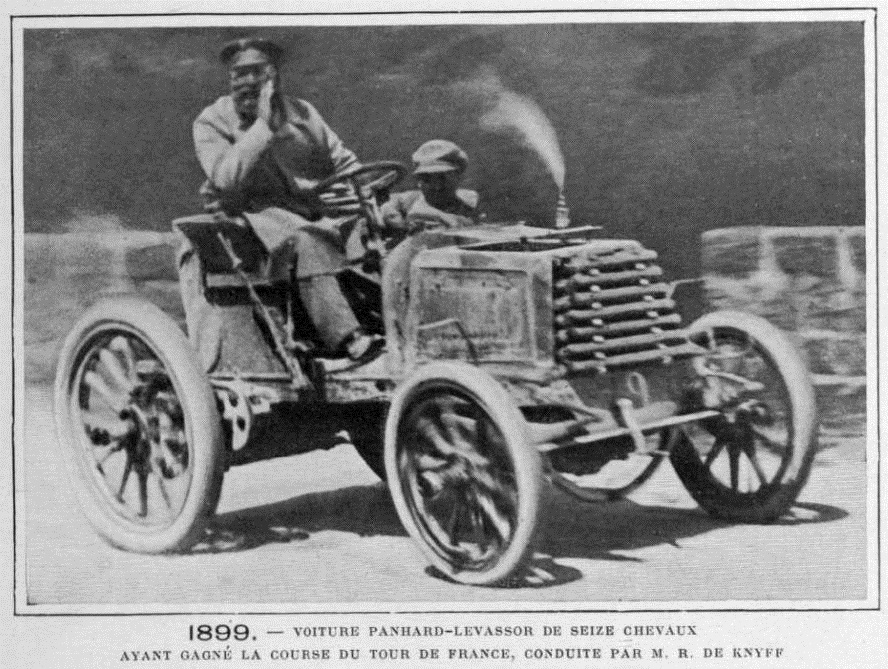
René de Knyff driving his 16hp Panhard et Levassor to victory in the 1899 edition of the Tour de France

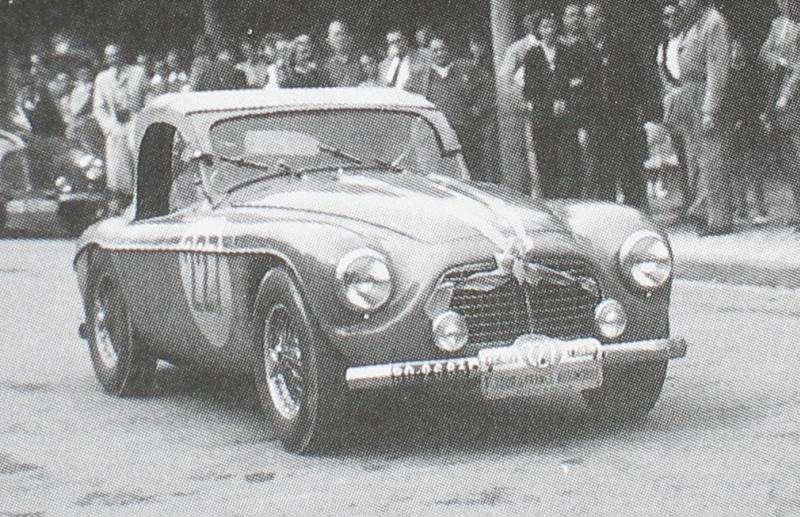
Pierre "Pagnibon" Boncompagni, winner of the 1951 Tour in a Ferrari 212 Export

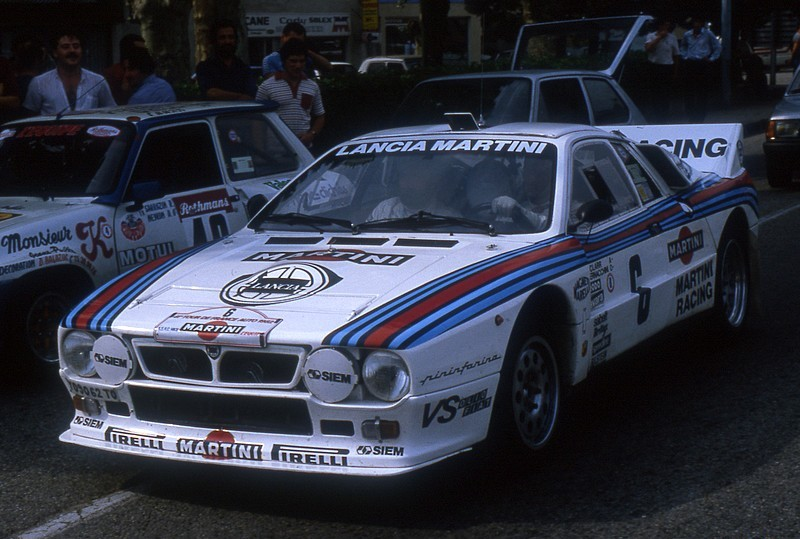
Jean-Louis Clarr at the 1982 event with a Lancia 037

Tour de France Automobile was a sports car race held on roads around France regularly (mostly annually) between 1899 and 1986.

== History ==
The first edition in 1899 was won by René de Knyff driving a Panhard et Levassor at 30 mph (50 km/h). Organized by Le Matin, under the control of the Automobile Club de France, held July 16 to 24, in seven stages: Paris-Nancy; Nancy-Aix-les-Bains; Aix-les-Bains-Vichy; Vichy-Périgueux; Périgueux-Nantes; Nantes-Cabourg; Cabourg-Paris. Out of 49 starters, 21 vehicles finished. The 1908 event was won by Clément-Bayard.

=== 1950s revival ===
The first event after the war took place in 1951, organised by the Automobile Club de Nice, and was won by Pierre Boncompagni "Pagnibon"/Barracquet in a 2.6-litre Ferrari 212 Export. The event visited the La Turbie Hill Climb, near Nice.

The 1954 event was won by the 2.5 litre Gordini of Jacques Pollet and M. Gauthier, on the traditional Nice to Nice route.

Scuderia Ferrari won eight times between 1951 and 1962. After the triumph of Alfonso de Portago in 1956, Olivier Gendebien won with partner Lucien Bianchi three times in a row (1957, 1958 and 1959).

The 1956 event was won by de Portago/Nelson in a Ferrari 250 2.9 with Moss/Houel (Mercedes 300 SL) in second place.

In 1958 the British racing driver Peter Whitehead had a fatal accident on the tour driving a Jaguar with his half-brother Graham Whitehead, who was considered a reliable co-pilot in long-distance races. On September 21, 1958, after dark, Graham was driving when the car broke through a rotten bridge railing in Lasalle, Gard, near Nîmes, and crashed into a ravine.

=== 1960s ===
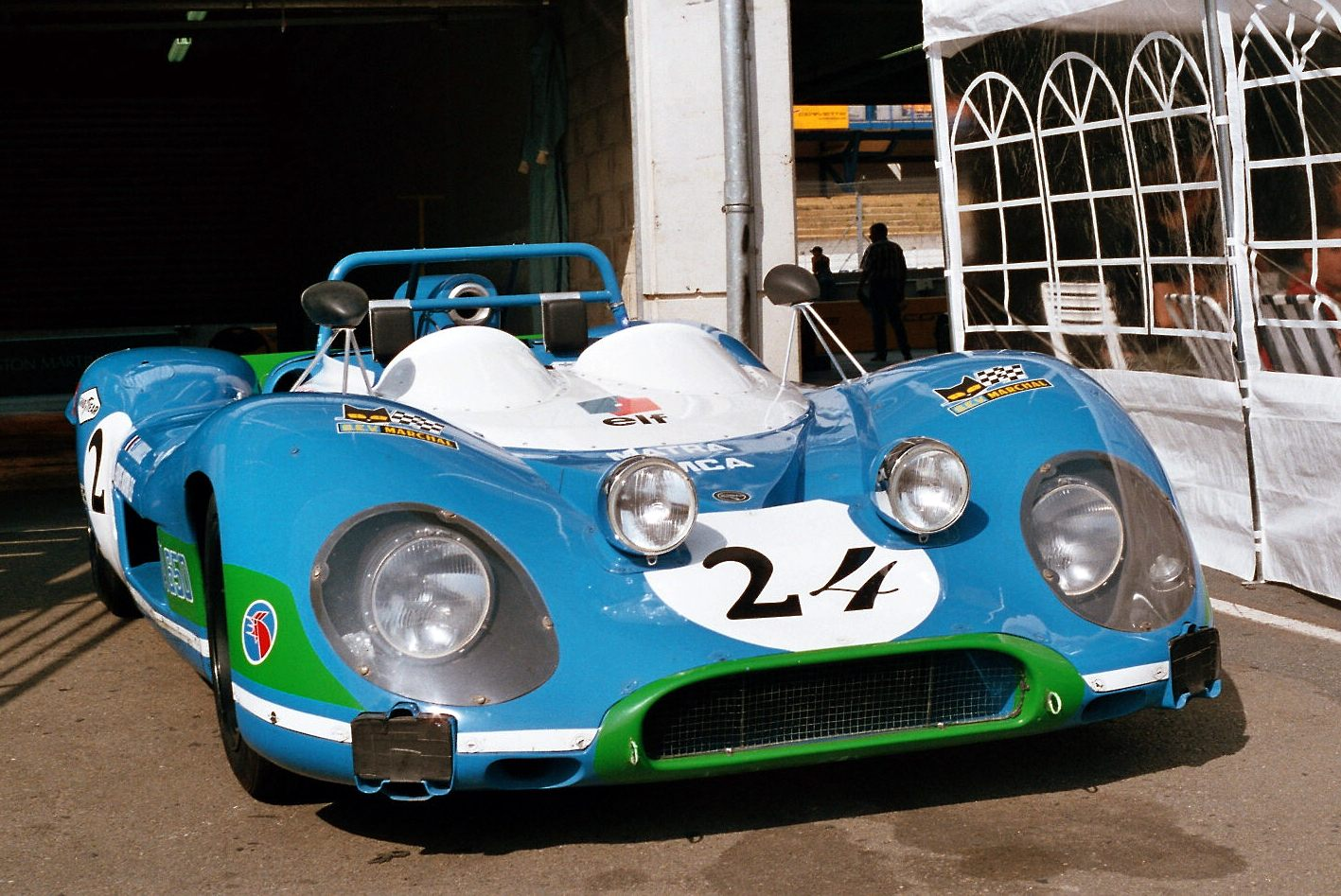
Matra MS650 with additional headlights for the Tour de France

In the 1960s, French racing and rally driver Bernard Consten (fr: Bernard Consten) won the race five times, making it the record winner to this day. In the same decade, the stage race was also opened to sports prototypes, so that racing cars like the Ferrari 512 S, the Ford GT40 or the Matra MS650 drove hundreds of kilometres on public roads.

The 1960 Tour de France took place between September 15 and 23 that year. Starting at Nice it visited Mont Ventoux, Nurburgring, Spa, Montlhéry, Rouen and Le Mans with the finish at Clermont Ferrand. The event was won overall by the Ferrari 250 G.T. of Willy Mairesse/Georges Berger. The Jaguar 3.8 litre Mk. II of Bernard Consten/J. Renel won the Touring category with the BMW 700 coupé of Metternich/Hohenlohe winning the Index of Performance.

Willy Mairesse won again in 1961 together with Georges Berger.

The last Ferrari victory was in 1964 with Lucien Bianchi/Georges Berger driving a Ferrari 250 GTO, entered by Ecurie Nationale Belge. The event started at Lille, visiting Reims, Rouen, Le Mans, Clermont-Ferrand, Monza and Pau. The Touring car category was won by Peter Procter/Andrew Cowan in a Ford Mustang, entered by Alan Mann Racing. The A.C. Shelby Cobras of Maurice Trintignant, Bob Bondurant and André Simon all retired.

=== 1980s ===
The 1980s saw the event incorporated into the European Rally Championship which saw an influx of new competitors. The last event was held in 1986.

=== Historic race ===
The event was revived in 1992 as a classic rally, now known as the Tour Auto. It is held in April and features both a competition and a regularity class. The format is a 5-day event combining about 2,500 km of roads, 4 or 5 circuit races and 6 to 8 hillclimbs. The start is always in Paris, whereas the finish alternates between various southern seaside towns like Biarritz, Cannes and Nice. Patrick Peter of Agence Peter is the organiser.

The winning cars over the years (since 1996 only pre '66 cars can win overall, even though cars up to 1974 are allowed) include the Ford Shelby Mustang 350GT, Ford GT40, AC Cobra 289, Lotus Elan, Ferrari Daytona Gr IV. Drivers who won the competition class include Jürgen Barth, Henri Pescarolo and Walter Röhrl.

== Competitors ==
Previous winners of the original Tour de France Automobile who have participated in the Historic Tour Auto include JC Andruet, Jean Ragnotti, Bernard Consten, Gérard Larousse, Johnny Rives.

Other famous entrants since 1992 were: Stirling Moss, Danny Sullivan, Phil Hill, Ari Vatanen, Emanuele Pirro, Eric Comas, Bobby Rahal, Rob Walton, Walter Röhrl, Jürgen Barth, Yannick Dalmas, Thierry Boutsen, Romain Dumas, Nick Mason, Olivier Panis.

Dutch racing driver Hans Hugenholtz won the competition class of the Patrick Peter organised event seven times, more than any other entrant, with a Ferrari Daytona Gr. IV, Shelby Mustang 350GT, Ford GT40 (twice) and a Lotus Elan (3 times).

== Winners 1951–1986 ==
Year	Driver(s)	Co-driver	Vehicle
1951	(France) Pierre "Pagnibon" Boncompagni	(France) Alfred Barraquet	Ferrari 212 Export
1952	(France) Marc Gignoux	(France) Mme Gignoux	DB 750
1953	(France) Jacques Péron - Sport	(France) R. Bertramnier	Osca MT4
1953	(France) Paul Condrillier - Touring car	(France) Daniel	Renault 4CV 1062
1954	(France) Jacques Pollet	(France) Hubert Gauthier	Gordini T15S
1956	(Spain) Alfonso de Portago	(United States) Edmont Nelson	Ferrari 250 GT Berlinetta
1957	(Belgium) Olivier Gendebien - GT Category	(Belgium) Lucien Bianchi	Ferrari 250 GT Berlinetta
1957	(France) Jean Hébert - Touring car	(France) Marcel Lauga	Alfa Romeo Giulietta Sprint Veloce
1958	(Belgium) Olivier Gendebien - GT Category	(Belgium) Lucien Bianchi	Ferrari 250 GT Berlinetta
1958	(France) Jean Hébert - Touring car	(France) Bernard Consten	Alfa Romeo Giulietta Sprint Veloce
1959	(Belgium) Olivier Gendebien - GT Category	(Belgium) Lucien Bianchi	Ferrari 250 GT Berlinetta 'Interim'
1959	(France) Hermano da Silva Ramos - Touring car	(France) Jean Estager	Jaguar Mark 1
1960	(Belgium) Willy Mairesse - GT Category	(Belgium) Georges Berger	Ferrari 250 GT Berlinetta SWB
1960	(France) Bernard Consten - Touring car	(France) Jack Renel	Jaguar Mark 2
1961	(Belgium) Willy Mairesse - GT Category	(Belgium) Georges Berger	Ferrari 250 GT Berlinetta SWB
1961	(France) Bernard Consten - Touring car	(France) Jack Renel	Jaguar Mark 2
1962	(France) André Simon - GT Category	(France) Maurice Dupeyron	Ferrari 250 GT Berlinetta SWB
1962	(France) Bernard Consten - Touring car	(France) Jack Renel	Jaguar Mark 2
1963	(France) Jean Guichet - GT Category	(France) José Behra	Ferrari 250 GTO
1963	(France) Bernard Consten - Touring car	(France) Jack Renel	Jaguar Mark 2
1964	(Belgium) Lucien Bianchi - GT Category	(Belgium) Georges Berger	Ferrari 250 GTO
1964	(United Kingdom) Peter Procter - Touring car	(United Kingdom) Andrew Cowan	Ford Mustang
1969	(France) Gérard Larrousse	(France) Maurice Gélin	Porsche 911 R
1970	(France) Jean-Pierre Beltoise (France) Patrick Depailler	(France) Jean Todt	Matra 650
1971	(France) Gérard Larrousse	(France) Johnny Rives	Matra 650
1972	(France) Jean-Claude Andruet	(France) "Biche"	Ferrari 365 GTB4
1973	(Italy) Sandro Munari	(Italy) Mario Mannucci	Lancia Stratos HF
1974	(France) Gérard Larrousse (France) Jean-Pierre Nicolas	(France) Johnny Rives	Ligier JS2
1975	(France) Bernard Darniche	(France) Alain Mahé	Lancia Stratos HF
1976	(France) Jacques Henry	(France) Bernard-Etienne Grobot	Porsche Carrera
1977	(France) Bernard Darniche	(France) Alain Mahé	Lancia Stratos HF
1978	(France) Michèle Mouton	(France) Françoise Conconi	Fiat 131 Abarth
1979	(France) Bernard Darniche	(France) Alain Mahé	Lancia Stratos HF
1980	(France) Bernard Darniche	(France) Alain Mahé	Lancia Stratos HF
1981	(France) Jean-Claude Andruet	(France) Chantal Bouchetal	Ferrari 308 GTB
1982	(France) Jean-Claude Andruet	(France) "Biche"	Ferrari 308 GTB
1983	(France) Guy Fréquelin	(France) Jean-François Fauchille	Opel Manta 400
1984	(France) Jean Ragnotti	(France) Pierre Thimonier	Renault 5 Turbo
1985	(France) Jean Ragnotti	(France) Pierre Thimonier	Renault 5 Maxi Turbo
1986	(France) François Chatriot	(France) Michel Périn	Renault 5 Maxi Turbo

== See also ==
- Giro d'Italia automobilistico
