= David Salanon =

French rally driver (born 1974)

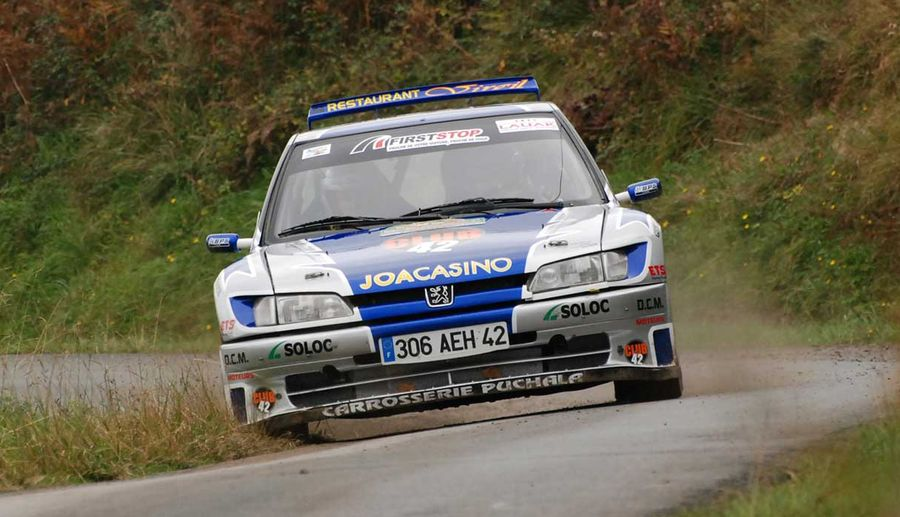
- David Salanon driving a Peugeot 306 kit car in 2010

Personal information
- Nationality: French
- Born: 5 January 1974 (age 52)

David Salanon (born 5 January 1974) is a French rally driver, who drives in the French Rally Championship. He won for the first time in 2007 and in 2015, he won the season-ending Rallye du Var for the first time, having finished in the runner-up position behind nine time World Rally Champion Sébastien Loeb last year.

He never put a foot wrong as his Ford Fiesta RS WRC finished every stage in the top six as well as winning all stages held on the second day. He maintained a lead that was held throughout.
