= Munaron =

Munaron is an Italian surname from Veneto. Notable people with the surname include:

- Gino Munaron (1928–2009), Italian racing driver
- Jacky Munaron (born 1956), Belgian footballer

== See also ==
- Munari
