= Michèle Espinos-Petit =

French rally co-driver

Michèle Jacqueline Henriette Espinos
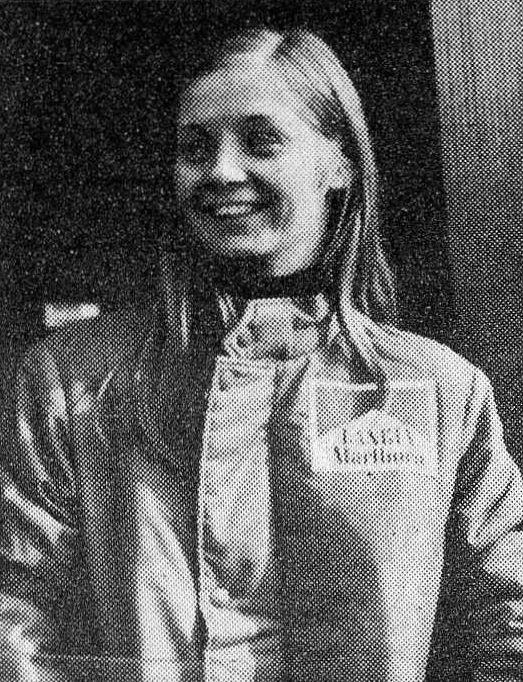
- Born: September 28, 1948 (age 78); Crémieu, Isère
- Other names: Michèle Espinos-Petit "Biche"
- Occupation: Rally co-driver

Michèle Jacqueline Henriette Espinos, née Petit, commonly known as Michèle Espinos-Petit, was born on September 28, 1948, in Crémieu in the Isère department of France. She is best known as a rally co-driver who competed under the nom de course of "Biche". Espinos-Petit was the first professional woman co-driver, and was part of driving teams that won several major rallying events, including the first ever World Rally Championship (WRC) race.

== Early years ==
""Biche", a colloquial term of affection meaning "hind" or "doe", was a nickname that Espinos-Petit acquired at an early age, and was at times the only name she would answer to.

Growing up on her family's estate, Espinos-Petit had an early exposure to motorsports. As a young child, she preferred cars to dolls. At 7 years old, her father created a small race track on the property, and bought 3 go-carts for his daughters to drive there. Her parents rallyed together as a team, the house was full of rally memorabilia, and the family was often visited by rally teams returning from the Monte Carlo rally, hosting both drivers and mechanics.

Espinos-Petit is related to the industrialist Grammont family. Her father's interest in racing was sparked by her great-uncle, Édouard "Eddoura" Grammont, a pilot, motorcycle racer, and racing driver who was killed in a racing accident near Grenoble.

Originally, Espinos-Petit had no plans to pursue racing as a vocation.

== Motorsports ==
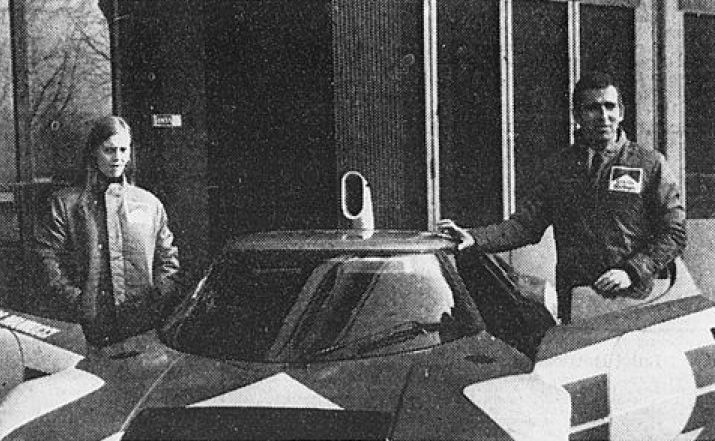
Jean-Claude Andruet and “Biche” with Lancia Stratos (Turin, 1973)

Espinos-Petit's first involvement in rallying came when she was asked by Jean-Claude Andruet, whom she had met through Jean Todt, to recce the route of the upcoming Lyon-Charbonnières rally. She and Andruet would become well known as a successful rally team.

The first rally that Espinos-Petit co-drove was the 1967 Rallye Paris – Saint-Raphaël Féminin. She was invited by her friend Dominique Jullien, the daughter of Claude Laurent and sister of Michel Jullien, both also rally drivers. The two drove Laurent's own 911S, and won on Espinos-Petit's first outing. She also won the final Paris – Saint-Raphaël event in 1974, this time paired with Christine Beckers in a Lancia Stratos.

The team of "Biche" and Andruet were twice outright winners in the Tour de Corse rally. They won in 1972 in an Alpine A110, and again in 1974 in a Lancia Stratos.

Espinos-Petit and Andruet were two-time winners of the Tour de France Automobile, ten years apart, both times in a Ferrari. In 1972 they won in a Ferrari 365GTB/4, and in 1982 they won driving a 308GTB.

""Biche" was teamed with Andruet when they won the 1973 Monte Carlo Rally, the very first Fédération Internationale de l'Automobile (FIA) race held under the brand new World Rally Championship rules. The Alpine team they were a part of went on to take the first Championship.

Espinos-Petit partnered with Andruet again in 1974 to bring their turbocharged Lancia Stratos home in first place in the 1974 Giro d'Italia automobilistico.

At one point, "Biche" was a member of Team Aseptogyl, an all-female racing team sponsored by a toothpaste brand who raced in pink and red livery. It was as part of Team Aseptogyl that she and driver Marianne Hoepfner drove an Autobianchi A112 Abarth in the 1976 Monte Carlo Rally, and finished in 25th place.

Other major races that Espinos-Petit took part in included the Acropolis Rally, Rally of Great Britain, Rally San Remo, Paris-Dakar Rally, Targa Florio, Bandama Rally/Rallye Côte d'Ivoire, Rally Costa Brava, Rallye de España, Rallye du Var, Critérium des Cévennes, Ronde Cévenole, Ronde Limousin, Rally Jean Behra, Rallye Lyon-Charbonnières, Ronde de la Giraglia, Critérium de Provence, Rallye d'Antibes, Ronde de la Première Terre, Rally dell'Isola d'Elba, Critérium Neige et Glace, Rally di Sicilia, Critérium International Alpin, Rallye du Mont-Blanc, Rallye de Genève.

Espinos-Petit navigated rallys in cars from Alfa Romeo, Alpine, Autobianchi, Ferrari, Fiat, Lancia, Mazda, Opel, and Porsche.

Espinos-Petit continued to co-drive for many years, increasingly in classic or vintage events. She also took part in the Rallye des Princesses in 2015.

== Personal life ==
Espinos-Petit had two siblings, both girls; one sister, Christine Petit, was a rally driver from 1977 to 1984. "Biche" was the sister of Dominique Petit, who was in rallying from 1966 to 1973.

Espinos-Petit was studying law when she began her rally career.

She married Jean-Pierre Augert, a former member of the French national alpine skiing team. Augert died in an avalanche in February 1976.

Some time after Augert's death, Espinos-Petit married Jean Pierre Victor Marie Espinos. Jean Espinos died on 12 August 2020.

Espinos-Petit's son, Frédéric Espinos, is involved in racing. He was the Formula E Championship manager, then joined the ABT CUPRA team, which became the Lola Yamaha ABT team, where he rose to deputy team principal. In September 2026, he moved to Citroën Racing as competition director and deputy team principal.

== World Rally Championship ==
WRC wins
Season	Rally	Country	Driver	Co-driver	Car
1973	42nd Monte-Carlo Rally	Monaco	(France) Jean-Claude Andruet	(France) "Biche"	Alpine-Renault A110 1800
1974	18th Tour de Corse	France	(France) Jean-Claude Andruet	(France) "Biche"	Lancia Stratos HF

== European Rally Championship for Drivers ==
The European Rally Championship for drivers was established in 1953. It should not be confused with the European Rally Championship for manufacturers—contested in 1968 and 1969—nor with the International Championship for Makes (sometimes referred to as the European Championship for Makes), which ran from 1970 to 1972, prior to the creation of the World Rally Championship in 1973.

ERC wins
Season	Rally	Country	Driver	Co-driver	Car
1972	25th Rallye Lyon-Charbonnières-Stuttgart-Solitude	France	(France) Jean-Claude Andruet	(France) "Biche"	Alpine A110 1800
1972	17th Tour de France automobile	France	(France) Jean-Claude Andruet	(France) "Biche"	Ferrari 365 GTB/4
1972	16th Tour de Corse	France	(France) Jean-Claude Andruet	(France) "Biche"	Alpine A110 1800
1974	2nd Giro d'Italia	Italy	(France) Jean-Claude Andruet	(France) "Biche"	Lancia Stratos HF
1974	32nd Rallye Paris – Saint-Raphaël Féminin	France	(Belgium) Christine Beckers	(France) "Biche"	Lancia Stratos HF
1978	25th Ronde limousine	France	(France) Jean-Claude Andruet	(France) "Biche"	Fiat 131 Abarth
1982	41st Tour de France automobile	France	(France) Jean-Claude Andruet	(France) "Biche"	Ferrari 308 GTB
