= Munari =

Munari is an Italian surname from Veneto, derived from the Venetian word for 'miller'. Notable people with the surname include:

- Atílio Munari (1901–1941), Brazilian palaeontologist
- Bruno Munari (1907–1998), Italian visual artist and designer
- Claudine Munari (born 1954), Republic of the Congo politician
- Cristoforo Munari (1667–1720), Italian painter
- Daniele Munari (born 1983), Italian skier
- Davide Munari (born 2000), Italian footballer
- Dennis Munari (1948–2023), Australian footballer
- Gianni Munari (born 1983), Italian footballer
- Pellegrino Munari (c. 1460–1523), Italian painter
- Sandro Munari (1940–2026), Italian racing driver
- Ulisse Munari (born 1960), Italian astronomer

== See also ==
- 7599 Munari, a main-belt asteroid
- Munaron
