= Vallelunga =

Valley near Campagnano di Roma, Italy

Vallelunga (Italian for long valley) is a valley, or plateau, near Campagnano di Roma, Italy.

== See also ==
- Vallelunga Circuit
