= Rallye du Var =

French motor rally

The Rallye du Var is a motor rally held in the month of November in the French commune of Sainte-Maxime in Var. It is often held as the final round of the French Rally Championship. It began in 1950.

Famous participants include WRC champion, Sébastien Loeb (the 2000, 2009 and 2014 winner), the four-time Formula One champion Alain Prost, 1994 WRC champion Didier Auriol (the 1987 and 1988 winner), Freddy Loix, Craig Breen, Jari-Matti Latvala (the 2011 winner), Dany Snobeck (the 1982 and 2008 winner), 2010 24 Hours of Le Mans winner Romain Dumas, François Chatriot (the 1985, 1986 and 1989 winner), Renault F1 driver and 2008 Canadian Grand Prix winner Robert Kubica, and Julien Maurin (the 2013 winner). Jari-Matti Latvala was the first non-Frenchman and thus foreign driver to win the rally, and it was also his first win on asphalt.

As well as part of the French Rally Championship, the Rallye du Var was part of the European Rally Championship calendar from 1984 to 2001.

== Recent years ==
=== 2008 ===
Dany Snobeck, who had last won the Rallye du Var 26 years before, took his second victory in the event and beat out much younger drivers, such as the 25-year-old, Jean-Sébastien Vigion who finished second. The World Rally Champion, Sébastien Loeb, returned for this event and was third. Both of Snobeck's previous challengers, Eric Brunson and Pieter Tsjoen had retired so Snobeck was sure to win from the get-go.

=== 2009 ===
Sébastien Loeb who recently won the 2009 World Rally Championship won here again in the title-winning Citroën C4 WRC, but this time co-driven by his wife, Séverine Loeb, for his regular co-driver Daniel Elena was driving a separate entry. The podium finishers were Stéphane Sarrazin and Patrick Henry. The Belgian Pieter Tsjoen, who crashed out of last year's rally, led for one stage in his Ford Focus RS WRC.

=== 2016 ===
In 2016, the 62nd running of this event, Hyundai WRC driver Kevin Abbring and co-driver Sebastian Marshall in a Hyundai i20 WRC won this event, and was the second driver who is not French to win Rallye du Var, after Latvala's victory in 2011. Second place went to Yoann Bonato. In third was Sylvain Michel. David Salanon, the winner of last year's rally, suffered bad luck when he had an accident on special stage 10, Pignans, whilst leading, and this allowed Dutchman Abbring to win.

=== 2017 ===
In 2017, Frenchman David Salanon won the event for the second time, this time partnered with Jérôme Degout, with Sylvain Michel and Yohan Rossel completing the podium. Sébastien Loeb returned to the event, driving his recently refurbished Formula 2 Peugeot 306 Maxi. Despite his car being 20 years older than those of his rivals, Loeb led for most of the event, eventually dropping behind Salanon to second, before retiring on the penultimate stage with an engine issue.

=== 2018 ===
In 2018, Yoann Bonato won this event for the first time. Sylvain Michel led early on but suffered an accident in special stage 3 which ended his challenge.

== Winners ==
- 2024: Yoann Bonato
- 2023: Yoann Bonato
- 2022: Nicolas Ciamin
- 2021: Nicolas Ciamin
- 2019: Sébastien Loeb
- 2018: Yoann Bonato
- 2017: David Salanon
- 2016: Kevin Abbring ( (Netherlands) )
- 2015: David Salanon
- 2014: Sébastien Loeb
- 2013: Julien Maurin
- 2012: Cédric Robert
- 2011: Jari-Matti Latvala ( (Finland) )
- 2010: Cédric Robert
- 2009: Sébastien Loeb
- 2008: Dany Snobeck
- 2007: Jean-Marie Cuoq
- 2006: Nicolas Vouilloz
- 2005: Nicolas Bernardi
- 2004: Alexandre Bengué
- 2003: Simon Jean-Joseph
- 2002: Cédric Robert
- 2001: Stéphane Sarrazin
- 2000: Sébastien Loeb
- 1999: Philippe Bugalski
- 1998: Philippe Bugalski
- 1997: François Delecour
- 1996: cancelled
- 1995: Patrick Bernardini
- 1994: Sylvain Polo
- 1993: Pierre-César Baroni
- 1992: Jean Ragnotti
- 1991: Bernard Béguin
- 1990: Bruno Saby
- 1989: François Chatriot
- 1988: Didier Auriol
- 1987: Didier Auriol
- 1986: François Chatriot
- 1985: François Chatriot
- 1984: Jean-Claude Andruet
- 1983: Guy Fréquelin
- 1982: Dany Snobeck
- 1981: Dominique De Meyer
- 1980: Jean-Claude Andruet
- 1979: Francis Bondil

== Famous drivers ==
- (Netherlands) Kevin Abbring
- (France) Jean-Claude Andruet
- (France) Mathieu Arzeno
- (France) Didier Auriol
- (France) Bryan Bouffier
- (France) Alexandre Bengué
- (Italy) Luca Betti
- (Republic of Ireland) Craig Breen
- (France) Philippe Bugalski
- (Switzerland) Olivier Burri
- (France) Pierre Campana
- (France) Yann Clairay
- (Republic of Ireland) Keith Cronin
- (France) Jean-Marie Cuoq
- (France) François Delecour
- (France) Bernard Darniche
- (France) Romain Dumas
- (France) Guy Fréquelin
- (Italy) Matteo Gamba
- (Germany) Hermann Gassner, Jr.
- (France) Quentin Gilbert
- (Switzerland) Jonathan Hirschi
- (Germany) Thomas Holzer
- (United Kingdom) Chris Ingram
- (Poland) Andrzej Koper
- (Poland) Robert Kubica
- (Finland) Jari-Matti Latvala
- (France) Stéphane Lefebvre
- (Belgium) Freddy Loix
- (France) Sébastien Loeb
- (France) Julien Maurin
- (United Kingdom) Jimmy McRae
- (Finland) Jarkko Nikara
- (France) Sébastien Ogier
- (France) Alain Oreille
- (France) Gilles Panizzi
- (France) Alain Prost
- (Zimbabwe) Conrad Rautenbach
- (France) Bruno Saby
- (France) David Salanon
- (France) Stéphane Sarrazin
- (Bulgaria) Todor Slavov
- (Bulgaria) Ekaterina Stratieva
- (Estonia) Ott Tänak
- (France) Brice Tirabassi
- (Finland) Max Vatanen
- (Germany) Albert von Thurn und Taxis
- (France) Nicolas Vouilloz
- (Germany) Antony Warmbold
- (United States) Jon Woodner
