= Fiat Abarth 030 =

Fiat Abarth 030 (Abarth SE 030)
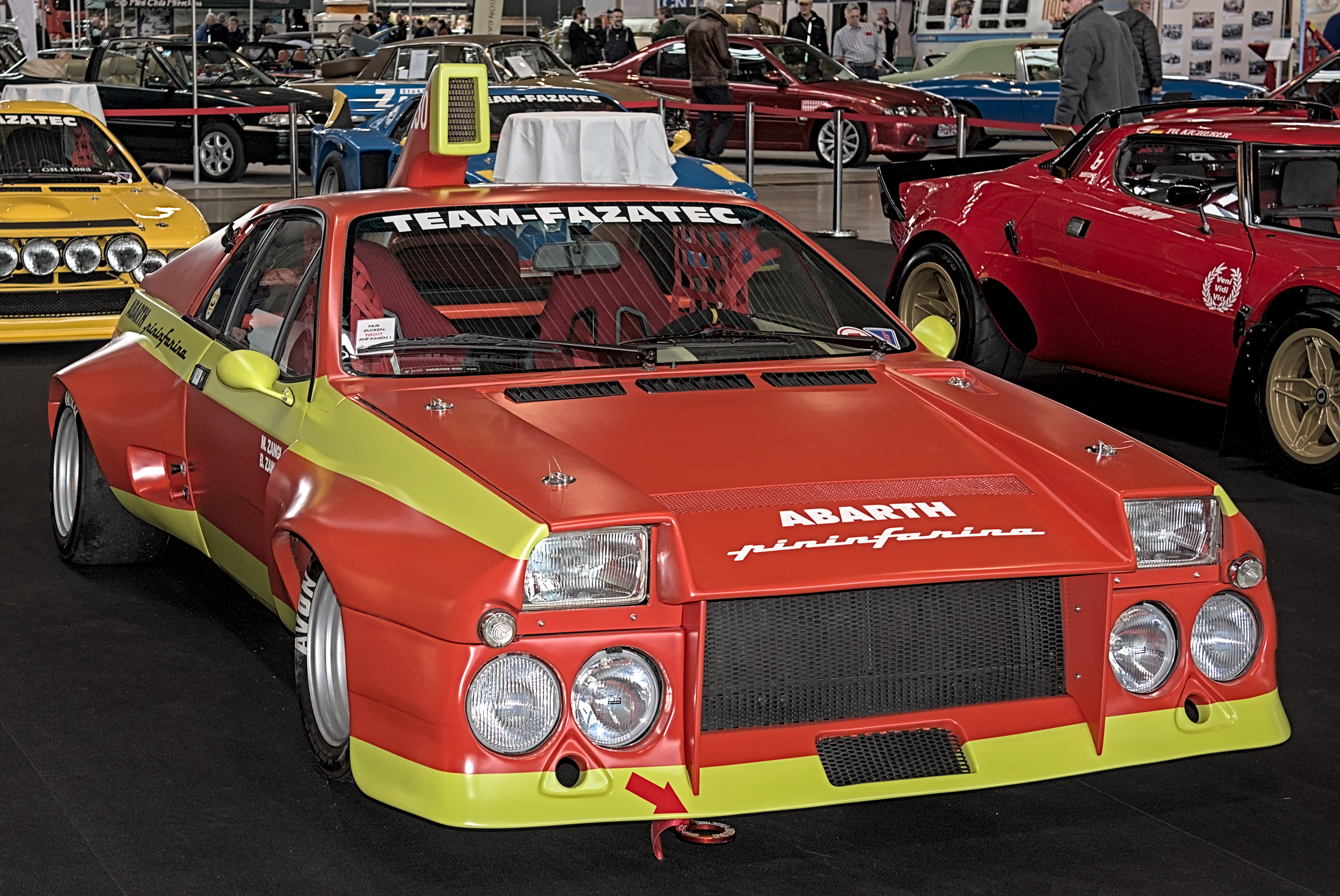

Overview
- Manufacturer: Fiat-Abarth
- Production: 1974
- Designer: Pininfarina

Body and chassis
- Class: Sports prototype
- Body style: 2-door coupé
- Layout: Longitudinally-monunted rear mid-engine, rear-wheel-drive
- Related: Lancia 037; Lancia Montecarlo

Powertrain
- Engine: Fiat 130-derived 3.4 L (210 cu in) V6, 285 hp (213 kW)
- Transmission: 5-speed manual

Dimensions
- Wheelbase: 2,300 mm (90.6 in)
- Curb weight: 910 kg (2,006 lb)

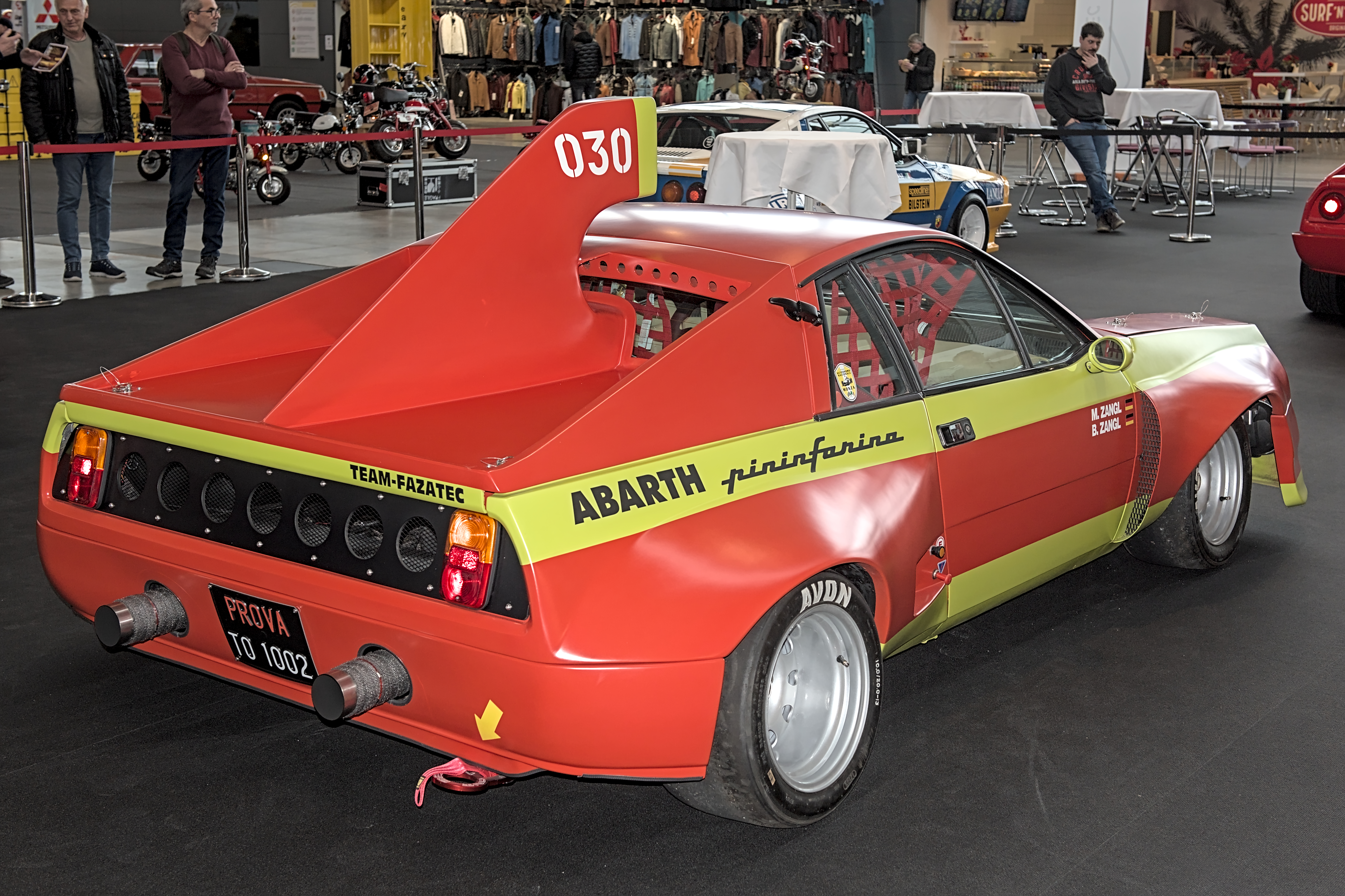
Rear view

The Fiat Abarth 030, also known as Abarth SE 030, is a sports car racing prototype produced by Abarth in 1974, in collaboration with FIAT and Pininfarina.

== Background ==
In order to replace the by now old model 124 Sport Coupé, in 1972 FIAT started the X1/20 project, whose presentation was scheduled for the Turin Motor Show in 1974, entrusting the study of the line to Pininfarina and construction of the chassis for the newly acquired Abarth.

However, the management of the Italian company was rather reluctant to list a car with a racing vocation; this is also in the light of the results obtained by the latest two sports models 128 Coupé and X1/9, characterized by high engineering and construction contents, but warmly welcomed by the market.

== The story ==
The synergy between Fiat, Abarth, and Pininfarina gave good results and, at the end of 1973, the first prototypes were in a rather advanced stage of construction. Given the advance in the times, it was decided to set up a special competition model to make it participate, for promotional purposes, in the Giro d'Italia, a race that consisted of road and circuit tests, at the time very popular with the enthusiasts from all over Europe. Once the racing version was completed and it was time to register for the race, no decision had been made about the future of the X1/20 project.

Thus it was that the car was entered in the 1974 Giro d'Italia under the name of Abarth SE 030. Led by the crew Giorgio Pianta and Christine Beckers, it took a considerable second place overall, behind the Lancia Stratos Turbo driven by the Andruet-Biche couple.

Subsequently, presented in an official capacity at the Turin Motor Show in 1974 as Fiat Abarth 030, the car was then produced in a street version and marketed starting in 1975, this time under the Lancia insignia (another brand of the Turin group ), and with the name of Beta. Montecarlo. The development of the 030 continued, evolving in 1980 into the Abarth SE 037 model, later transformed in the early 1980s into the multi-winning Lancia Rally 037.

== The car ==
There were two bodies built (n. 300 and 301), but it does not appear that the second car was used in competitions. Both the appearance of the bodywork and the technical configuration "all behind" (engine in the rear position, as well as the traction) anticipated those of the future Lancia Beta Montecarlo, albeit with important differences.

The engine is derived from the six-cylinder 3.200 of the Fiat 130, which was suitably developed by Abarth by increasing the displacement, strengthening the camshafts, and varying the fuel system with the inclusion of three Weber 48 IDF double-barrel carburetors. The changes brought the power to well exceed 250 hp.

As already mentioned, the engine was mounted at the rear, but it was necessary to insert it in a longitudinal position in order to be able to use the gearbox - differential unit produced by ZF, of the same type already used to equip the De Tomaso Pantera.

The car driven by Giorgio Pianta was purchased in 1979 by American Abarth driver and importer Alfred Cosentino.
