= Jean-Claude Andruet =

French rally driver (born 1940)

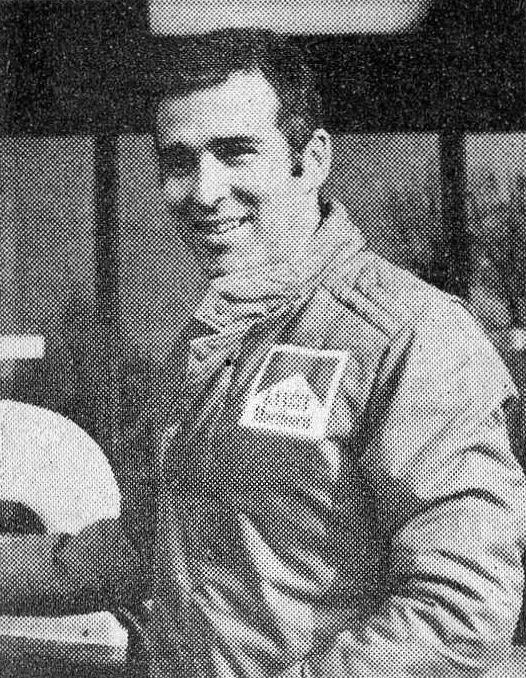
- Andruet with Lancia-Marlboro racing team in 1973

Personal information
- Nationality: French
- Born: 13 August 1940 (age 86); Montreuil

World Rally Championship record
- Years active: 1973–1986, 1995
- Co-driver: (France) "Biche" (France) Yves Jouanny (Belgium) Christian Delferier (France) Chantal Liénard Sola (United States) Sergio Cresto (France) Martine Rick-Place (France) Annick Peuvergne
- Teams: Alpine Renault, Lancia, Alfa Romeo, Fiat, Citroën, Rover
- Rallies: 29
- Championships: 0
- Rally wins: 3
- Podiums: 7
- Stage wins: 52
- Total points: 43
- First rally: 1973 Monte Carlo Rally
- First win: 1973 Monte Carlo Rally
- Last win: 1977 San Remo Rally
- Last rally: 1995 Monte Carlo Rally

Jean-Claude Andruet (born 13 August 1940 in Montreuil) is a retired French professional rally driver who competed in the World Rally Championship.

Andruet took three WRC event wins during his career; 1973 Monte Carlo Rally, 1974 Tour de Corse and 1977 San Remo Rally. The 1973 Monte Carlo was the first ever rally in the FIA World Rally Championship. His best placement in the overall drivers' championship was 13th in 1982. He won a total of five Le Mans 24 hours class wins and the 1977 Spa 24 hours. He also competed in the European Rally Championship, where he won in 1970 and finished second overall in 1981.

Andruet's son Gilles was a chess player and was murdered in 1995 in murky circumstances.

== Racing record ==
=== Complete IMC results ===
Year	Entrant	Car	1	2	3	4	5	6	7	8	9
1970	Alpine Renault	Alpine-Renault A110 1600	MON; DSQ	SWE	ITA	KEN	AUT	GRE	GBR		
1971	Alpine Renault	Alpine-Renault A110 1600	MON; 4	SWE	ITA	KEN	MAR	AUT	GRE	FRA	GBR
1972	Alpine Renault	Alpine-Renault A110 1800	MON; 26	SWE	KEN	MAR	GRE	AUT	ITA	USA	GBR

=== Complete WRC results ===
Year	Entrant	Car	1	2	3	4	5	6	7	8	9	10	11	12	13	WDC	Pts
1973	Alpine Renault	Alpine-Renault A110 1800	MON; 1	SWE	POR	KEN	MOR	GRE	POL	FIN	AUT	ITA	USA	GBR	FRA	N/A	N/A
1974	Lancia Marlboro	Lancia Stratos HF	POR	KEN	FIN	ITA	CAN	USA	GBR	FRA; 1						N/A	N/A
1975	Lancia Alitalia	Lancia Stratos HF	MON; Ret	SWE	KEN	GRE	MOR	POR	FIN	ITA						N/A	N/A
1975	Autodelta	Alfa Romeo Alfetta GTV									FRA; 3	GBR				N/A	N/A
1976	Jean-Claude Andruet	Alpine-Renault A310	MON; Ret	SWE	POR	KEN	GRE	MOR	FIN	ITA						N/A	N/A
1976	Ecurie Gitanes	Alpine-Renault A310									FRA; Ret	GBR				N/A	N/A
1977	Fiat France	Fiat 131 Abarth	MON; 2	SWE	POR; 4	KEN	NZL				ITA; 1	FRA; Ret	GBR			N/A	N/A
1977	Fiat S.p.A.	Fiat 131 Abarth						GRE; Ret	FIN	CAN						N/A	N/A
1978	Fiat France	Fiat 131 Abarth	MON; 6	SWE	KEN	POR	GRE	FIN	CAN	ITA	CIV	FRA; 2	GBR			N/A	N/A
1979	Fiat France	Fiat 131 Abarth	MON; 4	SWE	POR	KEN	GRE	NZL	FIN	CAN	ITA	FRA; Ret	GBR	CIV		22nd	10
1980	Fiat France	Fiat 131 Abarth	MON; 95	SWE	POR	KEN	GRC	ARG	FIN	NZL	ITA	FRA; Ret	GBR	CIV		NC	0
1981	Charles Pozzi	Ferrari 308 GTB	MON	SWE	POR	KEN	FRA; Ret	GRC	ARG	BRA	FIN	ITA	CIV	GBR		NC	0
1982	Charles Pozzi	Ferrari 308 GTB	MON; Ret	SWE	POR	KEN	FRA; 2	GRC	NZL	BRA	FIN	ITA	CIV	GBR		13th	15
1983	Martini Racing	Lancia Rally 037	MON; 8	SWE	POR	KEN	FRA; Ret	GRC	NZL	ARG	FIN	ITA	CIV	GBR		41st	3
1984	Martini Racing	Lancia Rally 037	MON; DSQ	SWE	POR	KEN	FRA; 6	GRE	NZL	ARG	FIN	ITA	CIV	GBR		30th	6
1985	Citroën Compétitions	Citroën Visa 1000 Pistes	MON; 8	SWE	POR	KEN	FRA	GRC	NZL	ARG	FIN	ITA	CIV	GBR		51st	3
1986	Citroën Compétitions	Citroën BX 4TC	MON; Ret	SWE; 6	POR	KEN	FRA	GRE; Ret	NZL	ARG	FIN	CIV	ITA	GBR	USA	36th	6
1995	Rover France	Rover Mini Cooper	MON; Ret	SWE	POR	FRA	NZL	AUS	ESP	GBR						NC	0

Sporting positions
Preceded by Harry Källström	European Rally Champion; 1970	Succeeded by Sobiesław Zasada
Records
Preceded by None	Youngest rally winner 30 years, 169 days (1973 Monte Carlo Rally)	Succeeded by Stig Blomqvist; 26 years, 203 days (1973 Swedish Rally)
