= List of female 24 Hours of Le Mans drivers =

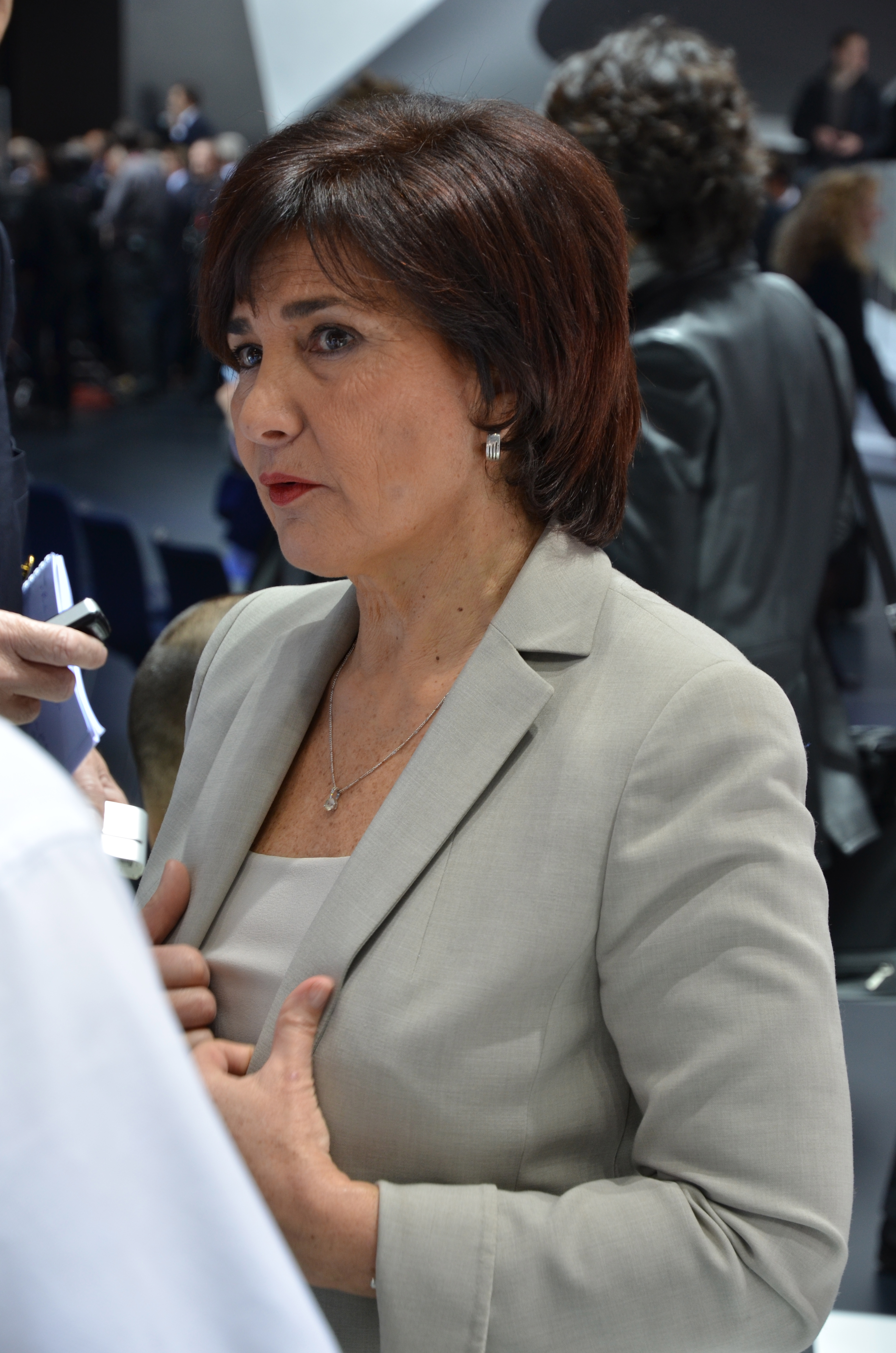
Michèle Mouton (pictured in 2011) won her class in the 1975 24 Hours of Le Mans.

The 24 Hours of Le Mans (French: 24 Heures du Mans) is an annual 24-hour automobile endurance race organised by the automotive group Automobile Club de l'Ouest (ACO) and held on the Circuit de la Sarthe race track close to the city of Le Mans, the capital of the French department of Sarthe. It was first staged as the Grand Prix of Endurance and Efficiency in 1923, after the automotive journalist Charles Faroux, the ACO general secretary Georges Durand and the industrialist Emile Coquile agreed to hold the race for car manufacturers to test vehicle durability, equipment and reliability. From the first event in 1923, the ACO advocated sexual equality by permitting women to participate at Le Mans, ranking them equally with men under its performance standards. After the fatal accident of Annie Bousquet at the 1956 12 Hours of Reims as well as spectator deaths in the 1955 Le Mans disaster and the 1957 Mille Miglia, the ACO barred women from entry. (Note: The ACO also cited Bousquet's driving style as a reason for banning women from racing at Le Mans until 1971.) The restriction was lifted two months before the 1971 race, possibly due to the women's liberation movement reaching French motorsport.

As of the 2025 24 Hours of Le Mans, there have been 68 female drivers representing 15 countries who have started the race a total of 165 times and have finished on 93 occasions. (Note: Gilberte Thirion was barred from competing for Equipe Gordini in the 1954 race because of her gender. Her place was taken by her father Max Thirion.) Anny-Charlotte Verney of France holds the record for the most starts in the race with ten. Switzerland's Rahel Frey is second with eight starts and Belgian Vanina Ickx is third with seven starts. The first two female drivers to compete at the event were Marguerite Mareuse and Odette Siko in 1930. France is the most represented country, having produced 24 female participants, followed by the United Kingdom with 17 female drivers and Belgium with five female racers. Colombia and the Netherlands became the latest countries to be represented when Tatiana Calderón and Beitske Visser made their debuts in 2020. The two most recent women to make their Le Mans debuts were Jamie Chadwick and Célia Martin in 2025.

Since the first race in 1923, there have been 31 all-female squads, consisting of either two or three drivers. There have been two all-female teams who have won their class. The first all-female crew to win their category was the "Christine" – Ecurie Seiko team of Christine Beckers, Yvette Fontaine and Marie Laurent in the 1974 edition and the second was the Société Esso trio of Christine Dacremont, Marianne Hoepfner and Michèle Mouton in the 1975 race. The race to feature the highest number of all-female squads was the 1935 event featuring four teams. The highest overall finish by an individual woman at Le Mans was achieved by Siko, who came fourth in the 1932 edition. The best performing all-female team was the seventh-placed Mme Mareuse duo of Maruese and Siko in the 1930 race.

== Drivers ==
=== By name ===
Key
1	Number in the best finish column denotes a driver's highest finish
DNF	Did not finish
NC	Not classified

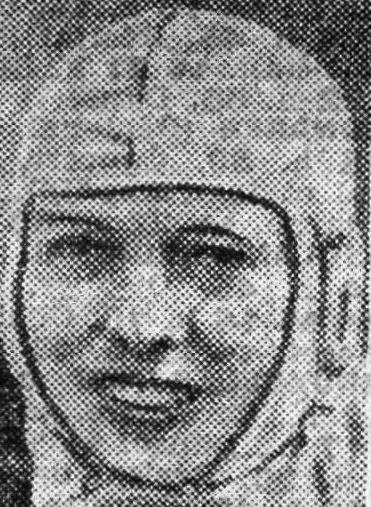
Odette Siko was one of the first two women to drive in the 24 Hours of Le Mans and competed in four editions overall.

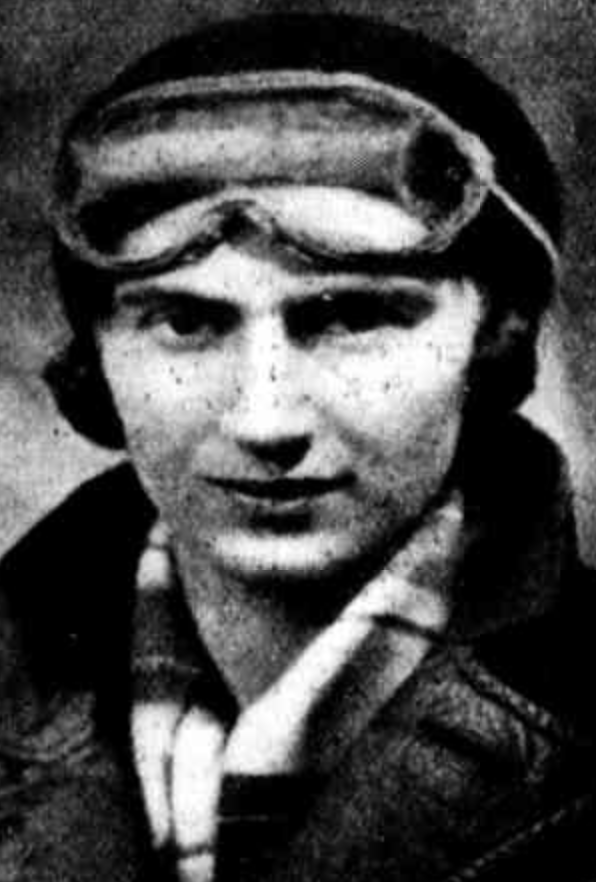
Joan Richmond was the first Australian woman to compete at Le Mans.

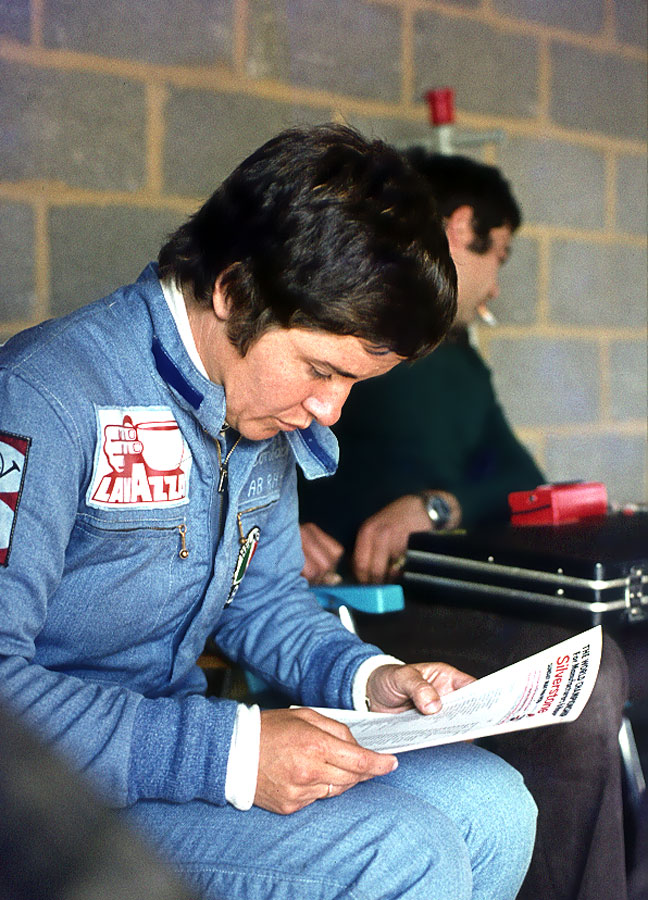
Lella Lombardi drove in four Le Mans races and finished second in her class at the 1976 race.

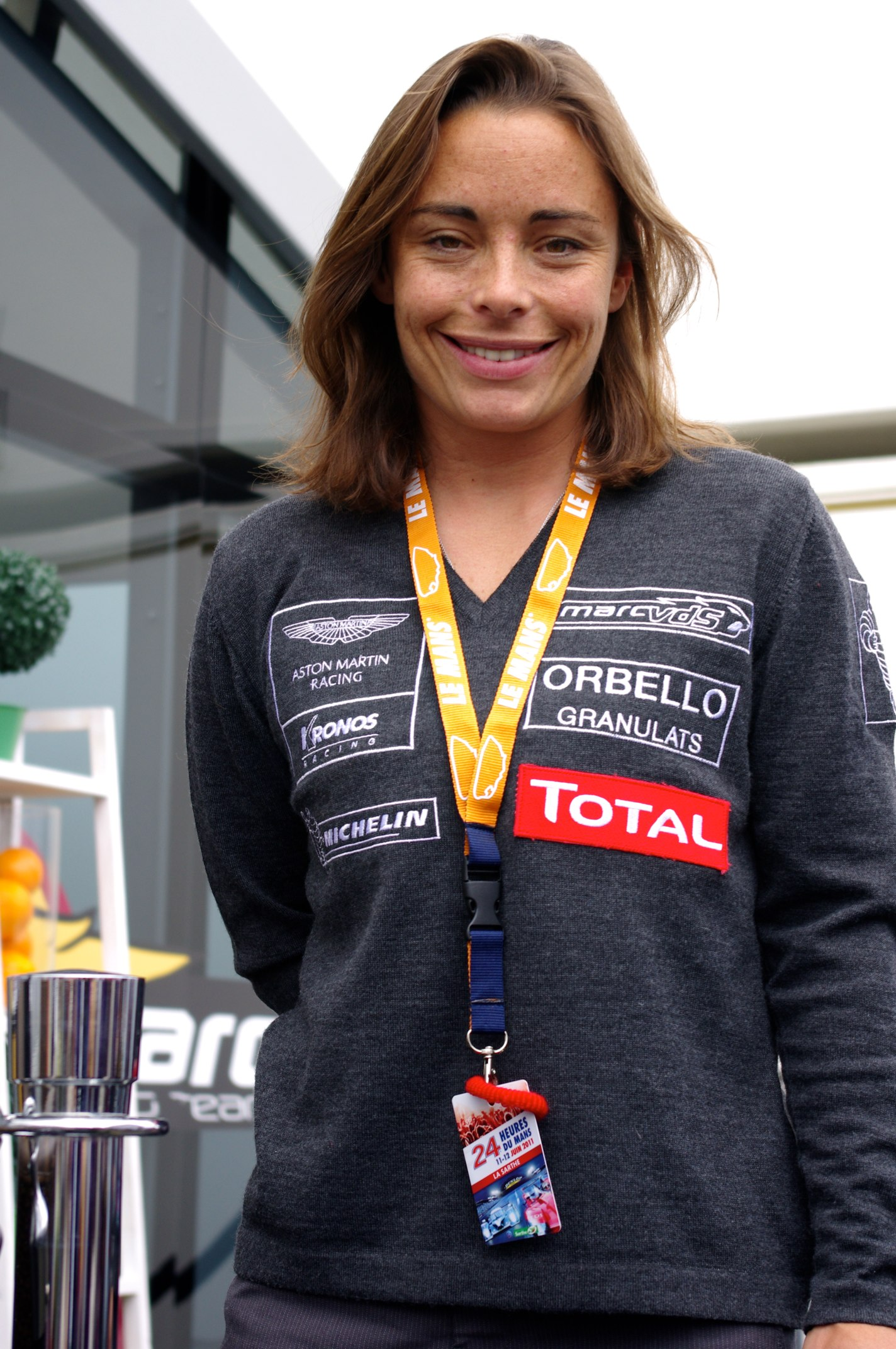
Vanina Ickx finished a career-high seventh place at the 2011 24 Hours of Le Mans.

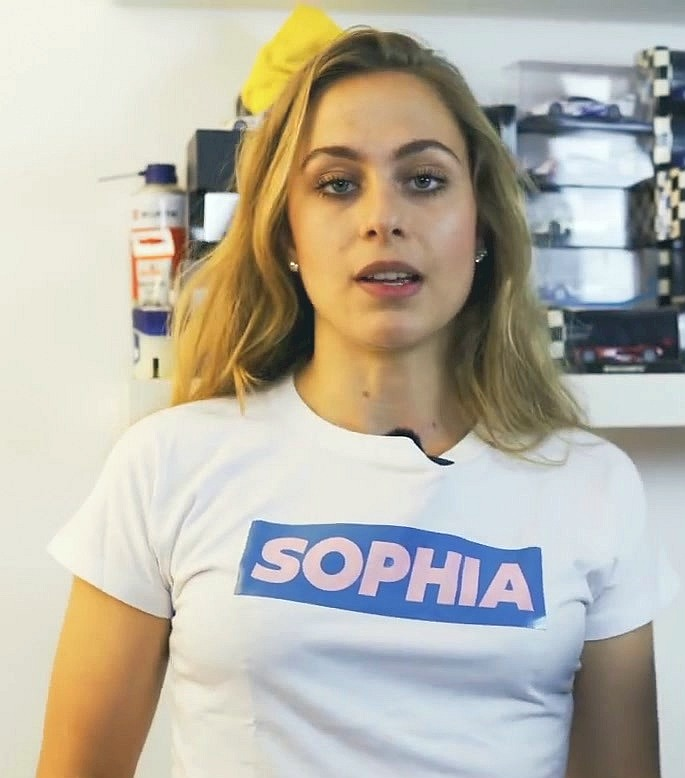
Sophia Flörsch was one of the three women to debut at the 2020 24 Hours of Le Mans.

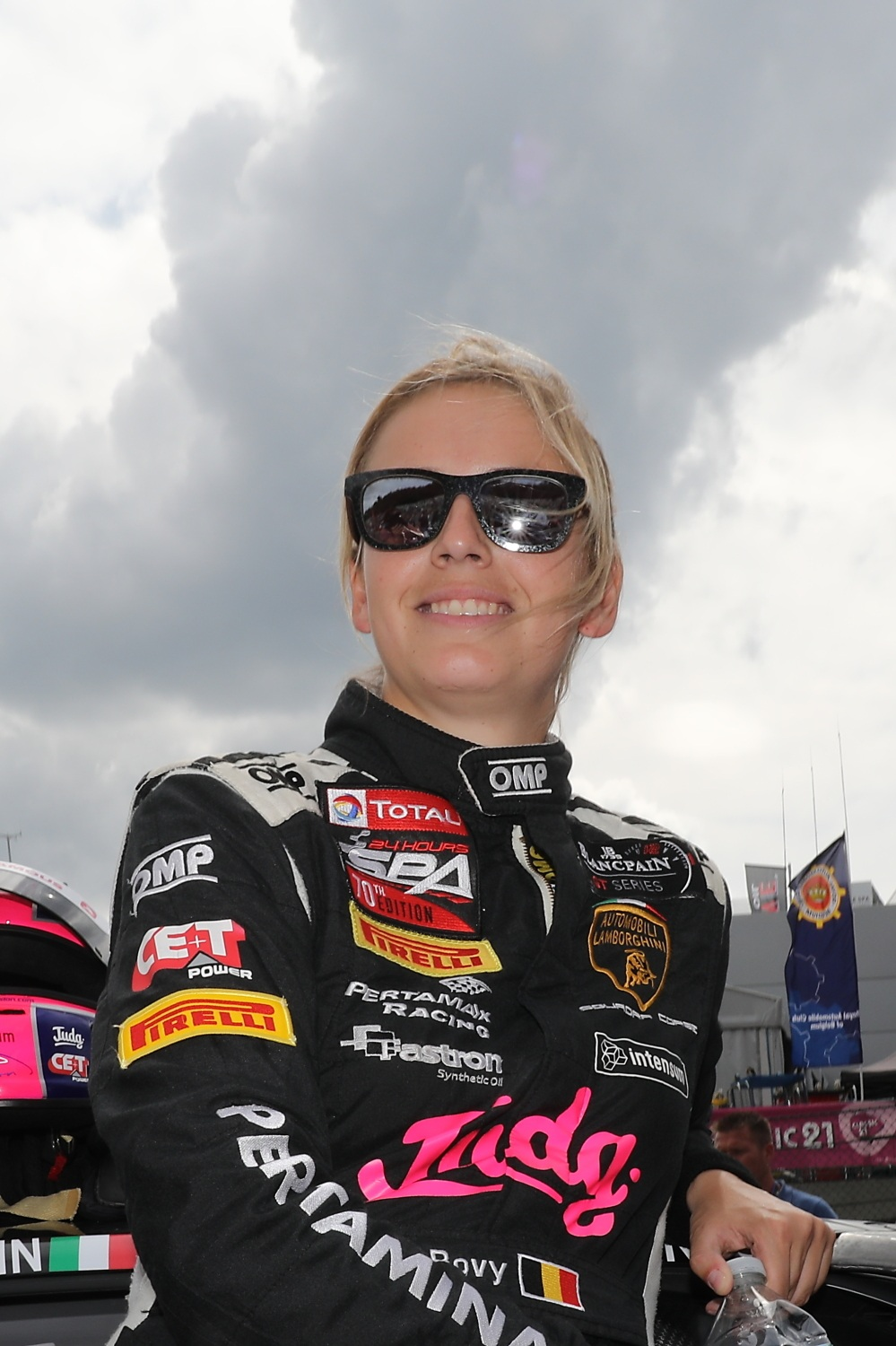
Sarah Bovy made her 24 Hours of Le Mans debut in 2021.

24 Hours of Le Mans female drivers by name
No.	Country	Name	Years	Starts	Best finish	Wins	Top 10	Class wins	Ref
1	France	Odette Siko	1930–1933	4	4	0	2	1	
2	France	Marguerite Mareuse	1930–1931	2	7	0	1	0	
3	United Kingdom	Joan Chetwynd (Note: Chetwynd entered under the name "The Honorable Mrs. Chetwynd" because she was married to Viscount Chetwynd.)	1931	1	DNF	0	0	0	
4	United Kingdom	H.H. Stisted	1931	1	DNF	0	0	0	
5	United Kingdom	Elsie Wisdom	1933, 1935, 1938	3	DNF	0	0	0	
6	France	Marie Desprez	1933	1	DNF	0	0	0	
7	United Kingdom	Dorothy Champney	1934	1	13	0	0	0	
8	Canada	Kay Petre	1934–1935, 1937	3	13	0	0	0	
9	France	Anne-Cécile Itier	1934–1935, 1937–1939	5	12	0	0	0	
10	United Kingdom	Gwenda Stewart	1934–1935	2	DNF	0	0	0	
11	United Kingdom	Eva Gordon-Simpson	1935	1	24	0	0	0	
12	Australia	Joan Richmond	1935, 1937	2	14	0	0	0	
13	United Kingdom	Doreen Evans	1935	1	25	0	0	0	
14	United Kingdom	Barbara Skinner	1935	1	25	0	0	0	
15	United Kingdom	Colleen Eaton	1935	1	26	0	0	0	
16	United Kingdom	Margaret Allan	1935	1	26	0	0	0	
17	United Kingdom	Dorothy Stanley-Turner	1937	1	16	0	0	0	
18	United Kingdom	Joan Riddell	1937	1	16	0	0	0	
19	United Kingdom	Marjorie Eccles	1937	1	DNF	0	0	0	
20	France	Fernande Roux	1938	1	DNF	0	0	0	
21	France	Suzanne Largeot	1937–1939	3	12	0	0	1	
22	United Kingdom	Marjorie Fawcett	1938	1	13	0	0	0	
23	France	Germaine Rouault	1938, 1950	2	DNF	0	0	0	
24	France	Viviane Elder	1949	1	DNF	0	0	0	
25	France	Régine Gordine	1950	1	DNF	0	0	0	
26	France	Yvonne Simon	1950–1951	2	15	0	0	0	
27	United Kingdom	Betty Haig	1951	1	15	0	0	0	
28	France	Marie-Claude Beaumont	1971–1976	6	12	0	0	1	
29	Belgium	Christine Beckers (Note: Beckers competed using only her forename.)	1973–1974, 1976–1977	4	11	0	0	1	
30	France	Anny-Charlotte Verney	1974–1983	10	6	0	1	1	
31	Belgium	Yvette Fontaine	1974–1975	2	11	0	0	1	
32	France	Marie Laurent	1974	1	17	0	0	1	
33	France	Martine Rénier	1974, 1976	2	13	0	0	0	
34	France	Corinne Tarnaud	1975	1	21	0	0	0	
35	France	Christine Dacremont	1975–1978	4	20	0	0	1	
36	France	Michèle Mouton	1975	1	21	0	0	1	
37	France	Marianne Hoepfner	1975, 1977–1978, 1980	4	21	0	0	1	
38	Italy	Lella Lombardi	1975–1977, 1980	4	11	0	0	0	
39	Italy	Anna Cambiaghi	1977	1	DNF	0	0	0	
40	United Kingdom	Juliette Slaughter	1978	1	DNF	0	0	0	
41	South Africa	Desiré Wilson	1982–1983, 1991	3	7	0	1	0	
42	United States	Margie Smith-Haas	1984–1985	2	DNF	0	0	0	
43	United States	Lyn St. James	1989, 1991	2	DNF	0	0	0	
44	France	Cathy Muller	1991	1	DNF	0	0	0	
45	Japan	Tomiko Yoshikawa	1992–1995	4	15 (NC)	0	0	0	
46	Switzerland	Lilian Bryner	1993–1995, 1997	4	9	0	1	0	
47	Germany	Claudia Hürtgen	1997–1999, 2001	4	13	0	0	0	
48	Belgium	Vanina Ickx	2001, 2003, 2005, 2008–2011	7	7	0	1	0	
49	Venezuela	Milka Duno	2001–2002	2	DNF	0	0	0	
50	United States	Liz Halliday	2005–2007	3	19	0	0	0	
51	United Kingdom	Amanda Stretton	2008	1	DNF	0	0	0	
52	Switzerland	Natacha Gachnang	2010, 2013	2	11	0	0	0	
53	Switzerland	Cyndie Allemann	2010	1	DNF	0	0	0	
54	Switzerland	Rahel Frey	2010, 2019–2025	8	30	0	0	0	
55	United States	Andrea Robertson	2011	1	26	0	0	0	
56	Japan	Keiko Ihara	2012–2014	3	14	0	0	0	
57	Denmark	Christina Nielsen	2016–2018	3	31	0	0	0	
58	France	Inès Taittinger	2016	1	DNF	0	0	0	
59	Denmark	Michelle Gatting	2019–2024	6	30	0	0	0	
60	Italy	Manuela Gostner	2019–2020	2	34	0	0	0	
61	Colombia	Tatiana Calderón	2020–2021	2	13	0	0	0	
62	Germany	Sophia Flörsch	2020–2022	3	13	0	0	0	
63	Netherlands	Beitske Visser	2020–2021	2	13	0	0	0	
64	Belgium	Sarah Bovy	2021–2025	5	30	0	0	0	
65	France	Lilou Wadoux	2022–2023, 2025–2026	4	13	0	0	0	
66	France	Doriane Pin	2023, 2026	2	DNF	0	0	0	
67	United Kingdom	Jamie Chadwick	2025	1	DNF	0	0	0	
68	France	Célia Martin	2025	1	49	0	0	0	

=== By country ===
24 Hours of Le Mans female drivers by country
Country	First	Drivers	Starts	Top 10	Class Win
France	1930	24	59	4	10
United Kingdom	1931	17	21	0	0
Belgium	1954	4	18	1	1
Switzerland	1993	4	15	1	0
United States	1984	4	8	0	0
Italy	1975	3	7	0	0
Japan	1992	2	7	0	0
Denmark	2016	2	9	0	0
Germany	1997	2	7	0	0
Canada	1934	1	3	0	0
South Africa	1982	1	3	1	0
Australia	1935	1	2	0	0
Colombia	2020	1	2	0	0
Netherlands	2020	1	2	0	0
Venezuela	2001	1	2	0	0

== All-women teams ==
Key
1	Number denotes team's class and overall finishing position
DNF	Did not finish
DSQ	Disqualified

Class abbreviations
1.1	1.1-litre
1.5	1.5-litre
3.0	3.0-litre
750	750 cc
S 1.1	Sports 1100
S 2.0	Sports 2000
GT	Grand touring
GTP	Grand Touring Prototype
Gr.6 3.0	Group 6 S Sports 3-litre
C1	Group C1
LMGT1	Le Mans Group GT1
LMP2	Le Mans Prototype 2
Group GT3	Le Mans Grand Touring Car
LMGTE Am	Le Mans Grand Touring Amateur

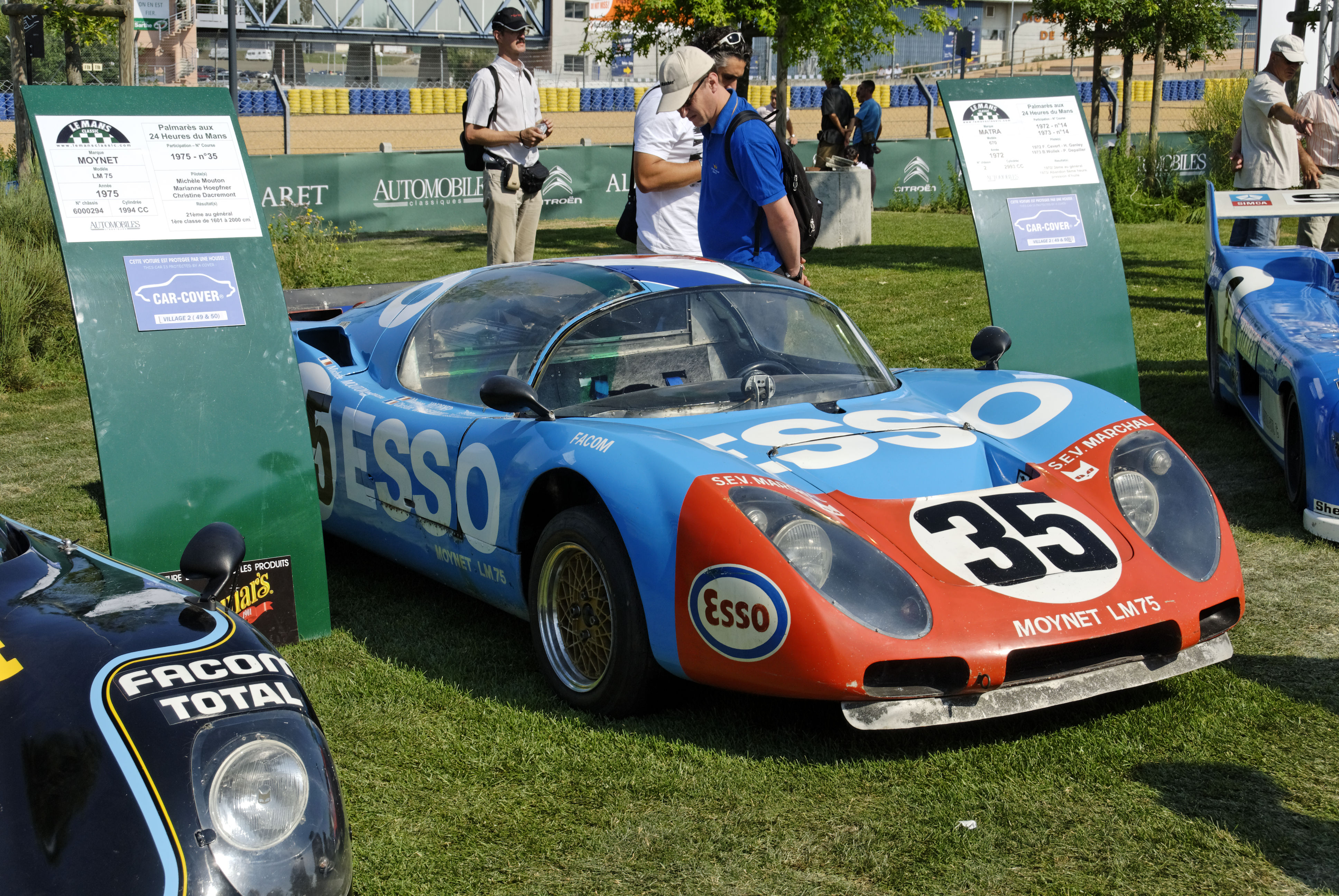
The Moynet LM75 car that Christine Dacremont, Michèle Mouton and Marianne Hoepfner used to win their class at the 1975 24 Hours of Le Mans.

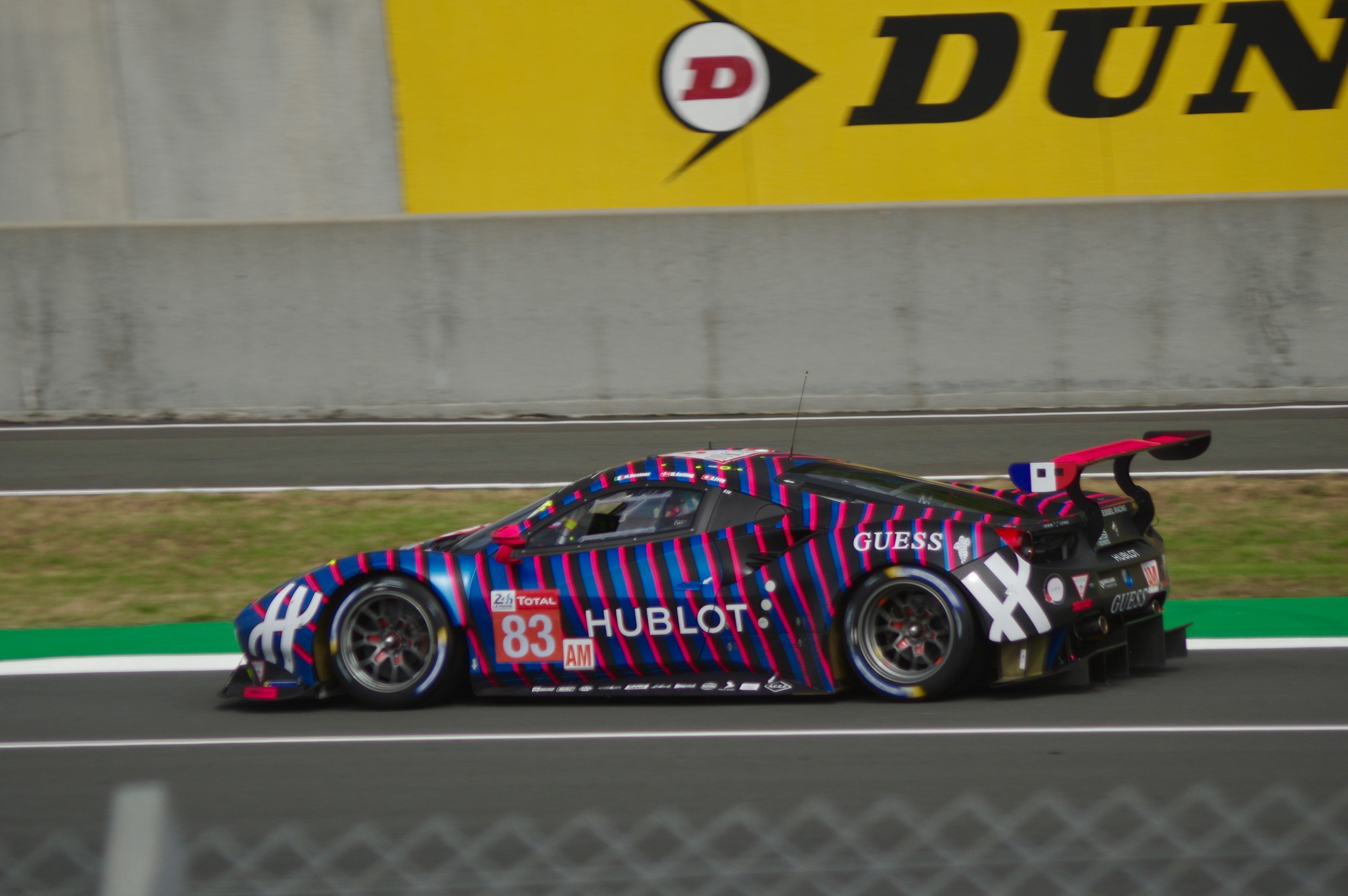
The Ferrari 488 GTE shared by Rahel Frey, Michelle Gatting and Manuela Gostner at the 2019 24 Hours of Le Mans.

24 Hours of Le Mans all-female teams
Year	Team	Nat	Drivers	Category	Car	Finish	Class
1930	Mme Mareuse	France	Marguerite Mareuse	1.5	Bugatti T 40	7	2
1930	Mme Mareuse	France	Odette Siko	1.5	Bugatti T 40	7	2
1931	Mme Mareuse	France	Marguerite Mareuse	1.5	Bugatti T 40	DSQ	DSQ
1931	Mme Mareuse	France	Odette Siko	1.5	Bugatti T 40	DSQ	DSQ
1931	Hon. Mrs. Chetwynd	United Kingdom	Joan Chetwynd	750	MG C-Type Midget	DNF	DNF
1931	Hon. Mrs. Chetwynd	United Kingdom	H.H. Stistend	750	MG C-Type Midget	DNF	DNF
1934	Miss D. Champney	United Kingdom	Dorothy Champney	1.1	Riley Ulster IMP	13	5
1934	Miss D. Champney	Canada	Kay Petre	1.1	Riley Ulster IMP	13	5
1935	Captain G. E. T. Eyston	United Kingdom	Eva Gordon-Simpson	1.1	MG PA Midget	24	9
1935	Captain G. E. T. Eyston	Australia	Joan Richmond	1.1	MG PA Midget	24	9
1935	Captain G. E. T. Eyston	United Kingdom	Doreen Evans	1.1	MG PA Midget	25	10
1935	Captain G. E. T. Eyston	United Kingdom	Barbara Skinner	1.1	MG PA Midget	25	10
1935	Captain G. E. T. Eyston	United Kingdom	Margaret Allan	1.1	MG PA Midget	26	11
1935	Captain G. E. T. Eyston	United Kingdom	Corinne Eaton	1.1	MG PA Midget	26	11
1935	Riley Motor Company	Canada	Kay Petre	1.5	Riley Nine MPH Six Racing	DNF	DNF
1935	Riley Motor Company	United Kingdom	Elsie Wisdom	1.5	Riley Nine MPH Six Racing	DNF	DNF
1937	G. E. T. Eyston	Australia	Joan Riddell	1.1	MG PB Midget	16	4
1937	G. E. T. Eyston	United Kingdom	Dorothy Stanley-Turner	1.1	MG PB Midget	16	4
1938	Mmes Roux et Rouault	France	Germaine Rouault	3.0	Amilcar "Pegase Special" G36	DNF	DNF
1938	Mmes Roux et Rouault	France	Fernande Roux	3.0	Amilcar "Pegase Special" G36	DNF	DNF
1939	Mme. A. Itier	France	Suzanne Largeot	1.1	Simca Huit	DNF	DNF
1939	Mme. A. Itier	France	Anne-Cécile Itier	1.1	Simca Huit	DNF	DNF
1950	Rouault et Gordine	France	Régine Gordine	S 1.1	Simca-Gordini TMM	DNF	DNF
1950	Rouault et Gordine	France	Germaine Rouault	S 1.1	Simca-Gordini TMM	DNF	DNF
1951	Luigi Chinetti	United Kingdom	Betty Haig	S 2.0	Ferrari 166 MM Coupé	15	3
1951	Luigi Chinetti	France	Yvonne Simon	S 2.0	Ferrari 166 MM Coupé	15	3
1974	Écurie Seiko-Scato	Belgium	Christine Beckers	S 2.0	Chevron B 23	17	1
1974	Écurie Seiko-Scato	Belgium	Yvette Fontaine	S 2.0	Chevron B 23	17	1
1974	Écurie Seiko-Scato	France	Marie Laurent	S 2.0	Chevron B 23	17	1
1975	Anny-Charlotte Verney	France	Corrine Tarnaud	GT	Porsche 911 Carrera RS	11	6
1975	Anny-Charlotte Verney	Belgium	Yvette Fontaine	GT	Porsche 911 Carrera RS	11	6
1975	Anny-Charlotte Verney	France	Anny-Charlotte Verney	GT	Porsche 911 Carrera RS	11	6
1975	Société Esso	France	Christine Dacremont	S 2.0	Moynet LM75	21	1
1975	Société Esso	France	Marianne Hoepfner	S 2.0	Moynet LM75	21	1
1975	Société Esso	France	Michèle Mouton	S 2.0	Moynet LM75	21	1
1975	Elf Switzerland	France	Marie-Claude Beaumont	S 2.0	Renault Alpine A441	DNF	DNF
1975	Elf Switzerland	Italy	Lella Lombardi	S 2.0	Renault Alpine A441	DNF	DNF
1976	Aseptogyl	France	Christine Dacremont	GTP	Lancia Stratos Turbo	20	2
1976	Aseptogyl	Italy	Lella Lombardi	GTP	Lancia Stratos Turbo	20	2
1977	Inaltera	Belgium	Christine Beckers	Gr.6 S 3.0	Inaltera LM77	11	4
1977	Inaltera	Italy	Lella Lombardi	Gr.6 S 3.0	Inaltera LM77	11	4
1977	Team Esso Aseptogyl	France	Christine Dacremont	GTP	Lancia Stratos Turbo	DNF	DNF
1977	Team Esso Aseptogyl	France	Marianne Hoepfner	GTP	Lancia Stratos Turbo	DNF	DNF
1978	WM A.E.R.E.M. / Team Esso Aseptogyl	France	Christine Dacremont	GTP	WM P76-Peugeot	DNF	DNF
1978	WM A.E.R.E.M. / Team Esso Aseptogyl	France	Marianne Hoepfner	GTP	WM P76-Peugeot	DNF	DNF
1991	Euro Racing/A.O. Racing	France	Cathy Muller	C1	Spice SE90C-Ford	DNF	DNF
1991	Euro Racing/A.O. Racing	United States	Lyn St. James	C1	Spice SE90C-Ford	DNF	DNF
1991	Euro Racing/A.O. Racing	South Africa	Desiré Wilson	C1	Spice SE90C-Ford	DNF	DNF
2010	Matech Competition	Switzerland	Cyndie Allemann	LMGT1	Ford GT	DNF	DNF
2010	Matech Competition	Switzerland	Rahel Frey	LMGT1	Ford GT	DNF	DNF
2010	Matech Competition	Switzerland	Natacha Gachnang	LMGT1	Ford GT	DNF	DNF
2019	Kessel Racing	Switzerland	Rahel Frey	LMGTE Am	Ferrari 488 GTE	39	9
2019	Kessel Racing	Denmark	Michelle Gatting	LMGTE Am	Ferrari 488 GTE	39	9
2019	Kessel Racing	Italy	Manuela Gostner	LMGTE Am	Ferrari 488 GTE	39	9
2020	Iron Lynx	Switzerland	Rahel Frey	LMGTE Am	Ferrari 488 GTE Evo	34	9
2020	Iron Lynx	Denmark	Michelle Gatting	LMGTE Am	Ferrari 488 GTE Evo	34	9
2020	Iron Lynx	Italy	Manuela Gostner	LMGTE Am	Ferrari 488 GTE Evo	34	9
2020	Richard Mille Racing Team	Colombia	Tatiana Calderón	LMP2	Oreca 07	13	9
2020	Richard Mille Racing Team	Germany	Sophia Flörsch	LMP2	Oreca 07	13	9
2020	Richard Mille Racing Team	Netherlands	Beitske Visser (Note: Visser replaced Katherine Legge, who sustained multiple injuries in a July 2020 European Le Mans Series pre-season test session accident at the Circuit Paul Ricard in France.)	LMP2	Oreca 07	13	9
2021	Iron Lynx	Belgium	Sarah Bovy	LMGTE Am	Ferrari 488 GTE Evo	36	9
2021	Iron Lynx	Switzerland	Rahel Frey	LMGTE Am	Ferrari 488 GTE Evo	36	9
2021	Iron Lynx	Denmark	Michelle Gatting	LMGTE Am	Ferrari 488 GTE Evo	36	9
2021	Richard Mille Racing Team	Colombia	Tatiana Calderón	LMP2	Oreca 07	DNF	DNF
2021	Richard Mille Racing Team	Germany	Sophia Flörsch	LMP2	Oreca 07	DNF	DNF
2021	Richard Mille Racing Team	Netherlands	Beitske Visser	LMP2	Oreca 07	DNF	DNF
2022	Iron Dames	Belgium	Sarah Bovy	LMGTE Am	Ferrari 488 GTE Evo	40	7
2022	Iron Dames	Denmark	Michelle Gatting	LMGTE Am	Ferrari 488 GTE Evo	40	7
2022	Iron Dames	Switzerland	Rahel Frey	LMGTE Am	Ferrari 488 GTE Evo	40	7
2023	Iron Dames	Belgium	Sarah Bovy	LMGTE Am	Porsche 911 RSR-19	30	4
2023	Iron Dames	Denmark	Michelle Gatting	LMGTE Am	Porsche 911 RSR-19	30	4
2023	Iron Dames	Switzerland	Rahel Frey	LMGTE Am	Porsche 911 RSR-19	30	4
2024	Iron Dames	Belgium	Sarah Bovy	Group GT3	Lamborghini Huracán GT3 Evo 2	32	5
2024	Iron Dames	Denmark	Michelle Gatting	Group GT3	Lamborghini Huracán GT3 Evo 2	32	5
2024	Iron Dames	Switzerland	Rahel Frey	Group GT3	Lamborghini Huracán GT3 Evo 2	32	5
2025	Iron Dames	Belgium	Sarah Bovy (Note: Bovy replaced Michelle Gatting, who sustained fractures to her foot during a pit stop at the 2025 24 Hours of Le Mans test day.)	Group GT3	Porsche 911 GT3 R (992)	49	16
2025	Iron Dames	Switzerland	Rahel Frey	Group GT3	Porsche 911 GT3 R (992)	49	16
2025	Iron Dames	France	Célia Martin	Group GT3	Porsche 911 GT3 R (992)	49	16

== See also ==
- List of female Formula One drivers
- List of female Indianapolis 500 drivers
- List of female NASCAR drivers
- List of female racing drivers

== Bibliography ==
- McCarthy, Todd (2007). Fast Women: The Legendary Ladies of Racing. New York City, United States: Hyperion Miramax Books. ISBN 978-1-4013-5202-8 – via Open Library.
- Vergeer, Koen (2009). Le Mans: geïllustreerde editie [Le Mans: illustrated edition] (in Dutch). Amsterdam, Netherlands: AmstelSport. ISBN 978-90-482-0026-9 – via Open Library.
- Spurring, Quentin (2011a). Le Mans 1949–59: The Official History of the World's Greatest Motor Race. Sherborne, Dorset: Evro Publishing. ISBN 978-1-84425-537-5.
- Spurring, Quentin (2011b). Le Mans: The Official History of the World's Greatest Motor Race 1970–79. Yeovil, Somerset: Haynes Publishing. ISBN 978-1-84425-539-9.
- O'Kane, Philip (2012). "A History of the 'Triple Crown' of Motor Racing: The Indianapolis 500, the Le Mans 24 Hours and the Monaco Grand Prix". In Hassan, David (ed.). The History of Motor Sport: A Case Study Analysis. Abingdon, Oxfordshire: Routledge. ISBN 978-0-415-67788-2 – via Open Library.
