= Christine Beckers =

Belgian racing-car driver

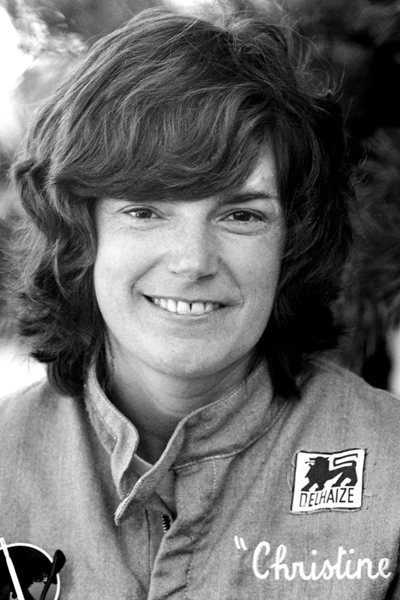
- Beckers in 1978
- Born: 4 December 1943 (age 82) Uccle, Belgium
- Years active: 1966–1979

Championship titles
- 1967, 1968, 1969, 1970, 1972 and 1974: Belgian Women's Drivers' Champion

Christine Beckers (known professionally by the mononym Christine; born 4 December 1943 in Uccle) is a Belgian former racing driver who had success in multiple disciplines: circuit (in touring cars and prototypes), rallying, rally raid, hillclimbing, autoslalom, and NASCAR.

== Career ==
Beckers made her debut in 1966 in rallying at the wheel of an NSU and drove for the German brand for two years. In 1967, she participated in 29 events including the 24 Hours of Spa with Marie-Claude Beaumont, and won her first title as Belgian Drivers' Champion.

In 1968, after several successes in an NSU Prinz and a few races in single-seater Formula Vee, Beckers was contracted by Alfa Romeo Benelux as a works driver. In 37 events, both on circuits and rallying, she regularly won her class in an Alfa Romeo GTV. The highlight of her season was winning the overall ranking at the Houyet hillclimb race driving the Alfa Romeo GTA SA of Team Lucien Bianchi.

Beckers competed in the 24 Hours of Spa eleven times, contesting her last official race on a circuit in July 1980. She also entered the 24 Hours of Le Mans four times between 1973 and 1977, and particularly distinguished herself in 1974, supported by the French Marie Laurent and Belgian Yvette Fontaine, winning the 2-liter class in a Chevron. In 1976, she joined the prestigious Inaltéra team, with Henri Pescarolo and Jean-Pierre Beltoise, in a team with Jean-Pierre Jaussaud and Jean Rondeau. In the 1977 24 Hours of Le Mans, together with Lella Lombardi (the only woman to have scored a point in the Formula One World Championship), she obtained the best female ranking in the competition to date (11th overall), despite a series of spins following an electrical failure at more than 320 kilometres per hour (200 mph) on the Mulsanne Straight. In the middle of the night, she repaired the Inaltéra alone, costing her more than two hours of downtime, both on the track and in the pits.

In addition, Beckers participated in three editions of the Paris–Dakar Rally, in 1979, 1980 and 1982, and was the first woman to do so.

In 1977, Beckers and Lombardi were invited by NASCAR to drive in the Firecracker 400 at the Daytona International Speedway. She also took part in two editions of the 24 Hours of Daytona at the same circuit, driving an Inaltera and a BMW M3.

In 2024, the 80-year-old Beckers is planning to set a Guinness World Record by becoming the oldest person to drive a Formula One car. On 21 July, she intends to drive a 1980s-era Arrows A8 around Belgium's Circuit Zolder.

== Personal life ==
Beckers was engaged to French driver Roger Dubos, but he died during the 1973 edition of the 24 Hours of Spa in a crash with the German Hans-Peter Joisten.

Trained as a journalist, Backers returned to this profession after her retirement from competition, notably in automobile magazines. She also rides motorcycles, flies, paraglides, and drives ATVs. She made several desert crossings with her second husband, Louis Schmitz. Together, they sponsored Thierry Boutsen in Formula 1, before adopting, with the help of Boutsen and Ayrton Senna, two children from Brazil.

In 2014, Beckers published an autobiography, La course ou la vie: Itinéraire d'une femme rapide (Race or Life: Itinerary of a Fast Woman).

== Record ==
=== Titles ===
- Five times Belgian Women's Drivers' Champion, in 1967, 1968, 1969, 1970, 1972 and 1974;

=== Notable victories and rankings ===
- Winner of the 1974 Rallye Paris – Saint-Raphaël Féminin, in a Lancia Stratos HF (last edition of the race, counting towards the European Rally Championship);
- Winner of the 1974 24 Hours of Le Mans 2-litre class, in a Chevron B23 with Yvette Fontaine (17th overall for the Seiko Scato team);
- Winner of the 1979 Paris–Dakar Rally Ladies' Cup in a Toyota Land Cruiser with Dominique Fougerouse (41st overall);
- Winner of the 1980 Paris–Dakar Rally Ladies' Cup in a Range Rover Bastos with Thierry Gérin and Marc Stinghlamber (7th overall);
- 2nd in the 1974 Giro d'Italia automobilistico, in a Fiat Abarth 030 with Giorgio Pianta;
- 2nd in the 1970 AGACI 300 of Montlhéry, in an Alfa Romeo T33/2, behind Bob Wollek
- 3rd in the 1970 6 Hours of Nürburgring, in an Alfa Romeo 2000 GTAm;
- 4th in the 1969 12 Hours of Huy, in an Alfa Romeo Spider;
- 7th in the 1973 24 Hours of Spa, in an Opel Commodore with Patrick Nève and Huub Vermeulen;
- 7th in the 1971 24 Hours of Le Mans, in a Chevron B21 with Roger Dubos;
- 7th in the 1969 3 Hours of Cape Town, in an Alfa Romeo GTV with Basil van Rooyen;
- 8th in the 1971 Tour de France Automobile, in a Porsche 911 S with Ennio Bonomelli;
- 8th in the 1968 12 Hours of Ypres, in an Alfa Romeo Giulia GT Veloce with Étienne Stapaert;
- 9th in the 1970 European Touring Car Championship in an Alfa Romeo GTV and GTAm 2 litres for Alfa Romeo Benelux and Autodelta (4th in the 4 Hours of Monza, 5th in Salzburg, 5th in the GP of Budapest, 4th in the GP of Brno, 3rd at the Nürburgring and 4th in the 4 Hours of Jarama);
- 9th in the 1973 1000 km of Spa-Francorchamps, in a Chevron B21 with Roger Dubos;
- 10th in the 1970 Tulip Rally, in an Alfa Romeo 1750 SV with Gaby Arend;
- 11th in the 1977 24 Hours of Le Mans, in an Inaltera LM77 (Gr. 6) with Lella Lombardi.

== 24 Hours of Le Mans results ==
24 Hours of Le Mans career
- Years: 1973–1977
- Teams: Dinitrol Total Blancpain, Michel Dupont Scato, Inaltéra
- Best finish: 11th - 4th in class (1977)

Year	Team	Co-Drivers	Car	Car #	Class	Laps	Pos.	Class Pos.
1973	(Switzerland) Dinitrol Total Blancpain	(France) Roger Dubos (France) Pierre Pagani	Chevron B21/23	2	S 2.0	9	DNF	DNF
1974	(Switzerland) Michel Dupont Scato (Belgium) Ecurie Seiko-Scato	(Belgium) Yvette Fontaine (France) Marie Laurent	Chevron B23	30	S 2.0	266	17th	7th
1976	(France) Inaltéra	(France) Jean Rondeau (France) Jean-Pierre Jaussaud	Inaltera LM	2	GTP	264	21st	3rd
1977	(France) Inaltéra	(Italy) Lella Lombardi	Inaltera LM77	2	Gr.6 S 3.0	279	11th	4th
