= List of female Formula One drivers =

This is a list of female motor racing drivers who have taken part in the Formula One World Championship since the inception of the World Championship for Drivers in 1950.

Maria Teresa de Filippis was the first woman to enter a Formula One race. As of 2026, four other female drivers have entered at least one Grand Prix, although only two have qualified and started a race. Lella Lombardi has competed in the most Grands Prix of any female driver, with 17 entries and 12 starts. Desiré Wilson is the only woman to win a Formula One race of any kind, finishing first in one round of the 1980 British Aurora F1 Championship.

== History ==
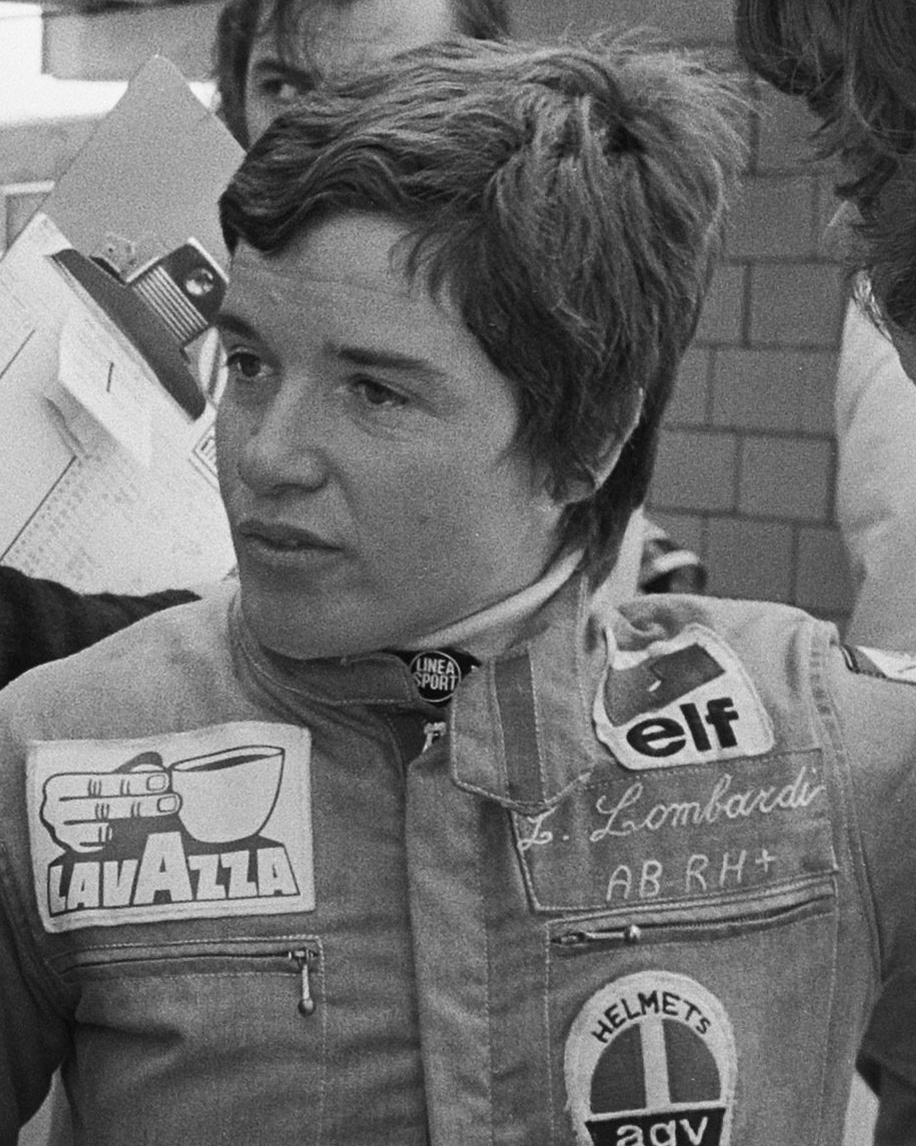
Lella Lombardi remains the only woman to score points in Formula One

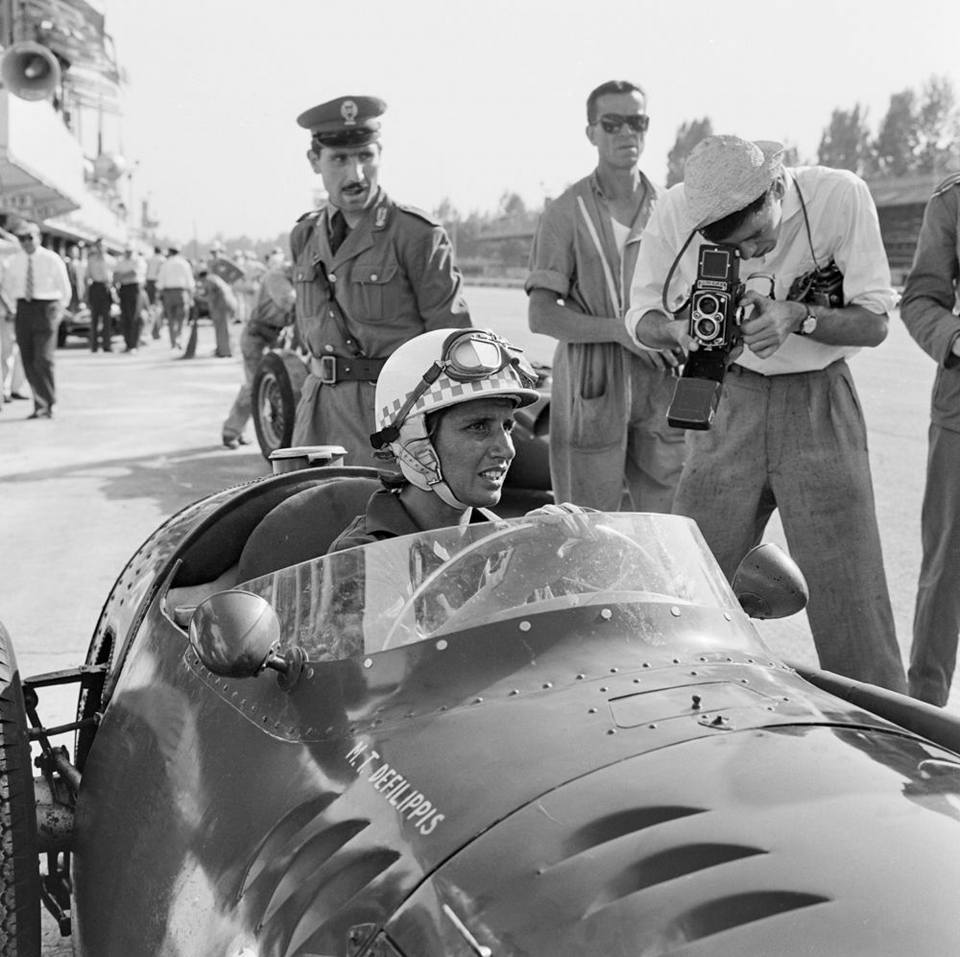
Maria Teresa de Filippis at Monza in 1958

The involvement of women in Formula One was pioneered by Italian Maria Teresa de Filippis, who entered five races between the 1958 and 1959 seasons in a Maserati 250F, starting three. She was the first woman to qualify for a Grand Prix, and scored her best result of tenth place in the 1958 Belgian Grand Prix. She did not take part in the following race in France—the race director denied her involvement, stating that "the only helmet a woman should wear is the one at the hairdresser’s." Maria ended her career at the Monaco Grand Prix the following year.

The only time I was prevented from racing was at the French Grand Prix. The race director said, "The only helmet a woman should wear is the one at the hairdresser’s." Apart from that, I don’t think I encountered any prejudice — only surprise at my success.

— Maria Teresa de Filippis

After fifteen years, another Italian driver, Lella Lombardi, competed in three seasons between 1974 and 1976. Lombardi entered seventeen races and started twelve, achieving her best career finish of sixth at the 1975 Spanish Grand Prix. The race was stopped following a spectator accident, but because at least 29 of the scheduled 71 laps had been completed, the rules stipulated that, for the first time, half points were to be awarded. Lombardi's sixth-place finish meant she became the first, and so far only, woman to score points in the World Championship.

In 1976, British professional skier Divina Galica attempted to qualify for three Grand Prix, including the British Grand Prix. This was notably the only Formula One Grand Prix in which multiple female drivers (Lombardi and Galica) entered. However, both failed to qualify.

In 1980, the South African Desiré Wilson tried to qualify for the British Grand Prix, but did not succeed. In the same year, she won at Brands Hatch in the British Aurora F1 championship, becoming the first woman to win a Formula 1 race. As of 2024, she is only female driver to win a Formula One race of any kind. As a result of this achievement, Wilson has a grandstand at Brands Hatch named after her.

As of 2024, the last woman to have driven in a Formula One Grand Prix event was Italian former Formula 3000 driver Giovanna Amati, who signed to Brabham at the beginning of the 1992 season. She failed to qualify for three races in which she was entered. She was replaced by Damon Hill, who also failed to qualify the same car in 6 out of the 8 following races he entered. Brabham's lead driver that season was Eric van de Poele, who only managed to qualify once. After 11 races, the team folded.

== Drivers ==
=== Official drivers ===
Drivers listed in this table are those who have entered a Grand Prix. Actual starts are stated in brackets.

#	Name	Seasons	Teams	Entries (starts)	Points
1	(Italy) Maria Teresa de Filippis	1958, 1959	Maserati, Behra-Porsche	5 (3)	0
2	(Italy) Lella Lombardi	1974–1976	March, RAM, Williams	17 (12)	0.5
3	(United Kingdom) Divina Galica	1976, 1978	Surtees, Hesketh	3 (0)	–
4	(South Africa) Desiré Wilson	1980	Williams	1 (0)	–
5	(Italy) Giovanna Amati	1992	Brabham	3 (0)	–

=== Test drivers and development drivers ===
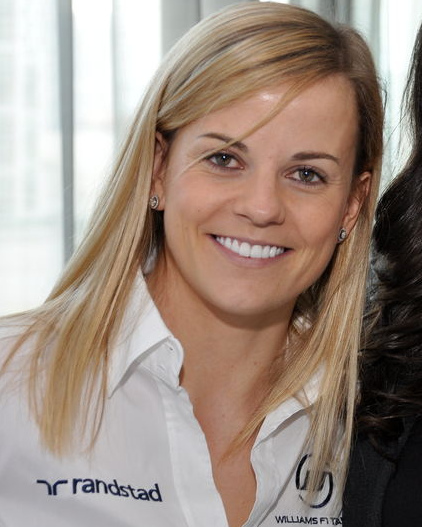
Test driver Susie Wolff in 2012

Some female drivers have participated in non-competition testing and evaluation sessions with Formula One teams. IndyCar driver Sarah Fisher performed a demonstration run with McLaren after first practice for the 2002 United States Grand Prix. Katherine Legge tested with Minardi at the Vallelunga Circuit in 2005.

Other female drivers have been contracted to Formula One teams in testing and development capacities. In 2012, Williams signed Susie Wolff as a development and test driver. Two years later, Wolff became the first woman to take part in a Formula One race weekend in 22 years, when she participated in the first practice session at the British Grand Prix at Silverstone; the previous time being in 1992, when Giovanna Amati who was the official Brabham team driver alongside Eric van der Poele, made three unsuccessful Grand Prix qualification attempts. Van der Poele and later Damon Hill, Amati's replacement, only managed to qualify the uncompetitive Brabham 3 times out of 18 attempts and the team folded after 11 races. María de Villota, the daughter of Spanish Formula One driver Emilio de Villota, was hired as a test driver for Marussia until her crash in 2012 at the Duxford Aerodrome during a straightline test. De Villota died from a heart attack caused by neurological injuries sustained from the crash the following year. In 2014, Sauber signed IndyCar Series driver Simona de Silvestro as an "affiliated driver", with the goal of having her compete in 2015. In 2015 Lotus F1 signed Carmen Jordá to a deal including a run in a car.

Sauber signed Colombian driver Tatiana Calderón as development driver for 2017. Calderón was promoted from her development driver role to test driver for the 2018 season, and tested an F1 car for the first time with Sauber in Mexico in October 2018.

In 2019, Williams Driver Academy signed leading W Series contender Jamie Chadwick as a development driver for the Williams F1 team. Chadwick later won the 2019 W Series championship, the 2021 W Series championship and the 2022 W Series championship, and continued as a Williams development driver in 2022.

In September 2023, Aston Martin driver ambassador Jessica Hawkins tested a 2021-spec F1 car at the Hungaroring.

In January 2026, Mercedes AMG Petronas F1 Team signed French driver and F1 Academy champion Doriane Pin as a Development Driver for the 2026 season. In April 2026, Pin tested a Mercedes W12 car at Silverstone as part of Mercedes' Testing of Previous Cars (TPC) programme.

== Milestones ==
- First woman to compete in a Formula 1 race: Maria Teresa De Filippis (first race entered: 1958 Monaco Grand Prix, first race contested: 1958 Belgian Grand Prix)
- First woman to score points: Lella Lombardi (1975 Spanish Grand Prix)
- First race with more than one woman entered: 1976 British Grand Prix (Lella Lombardi, Divina Galica)

== See also ==
- List of female Indianapolis 500 drivers
- List of female 24 Hours of Le Mans drivers
- List of female NASCAR drivers
- List of female racing drivers
- Women in motorsport
