= Yvette Fontaine =

Belgian racing driver

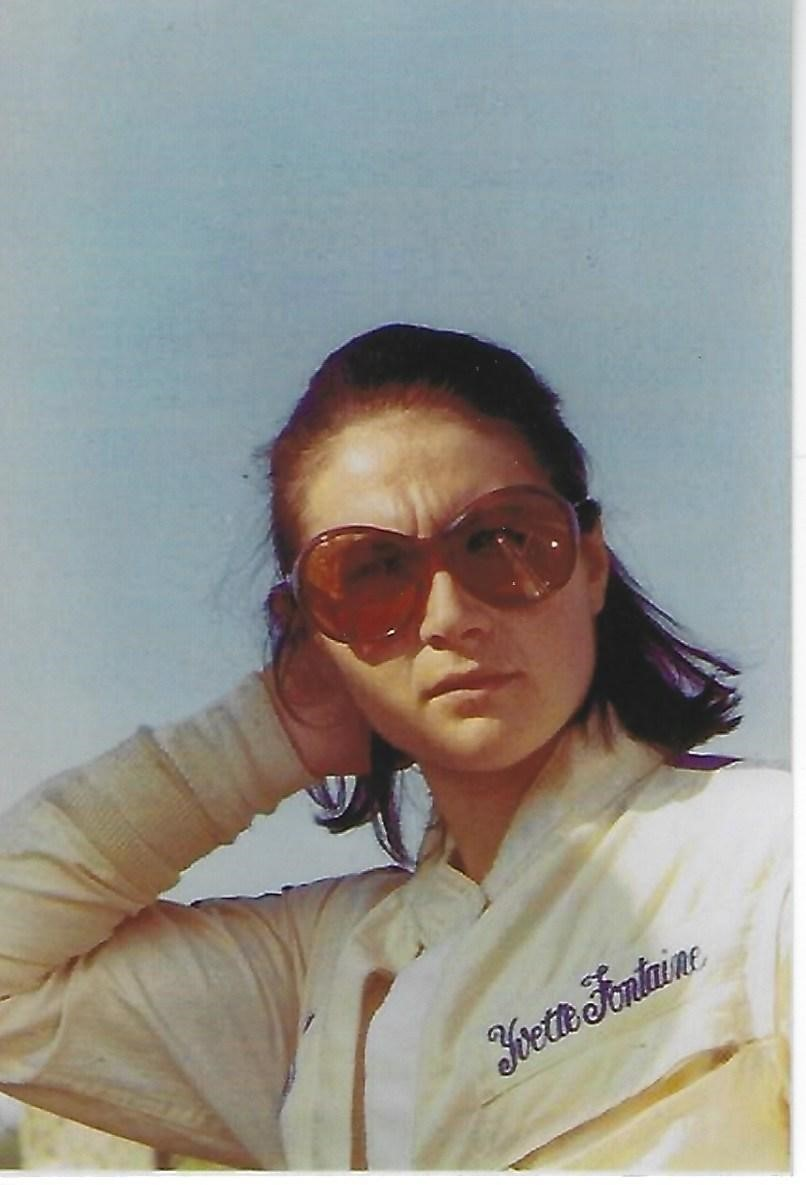
Yvette Fontaine in 1969

Yvette Fontaine (born 3 June 1946) is a Belgian former racing driver.

== Career ==
Born on 3 June 1946 in Hasselt, Belgium, Fontaine grew up with her parents near the Zolder race track and thus came into contact with motorsport at an early age. As a teenager, Fontaine attended events as a spectator whenever she could at the almost four-kilometer-long circuit. After experimenting with karting, she took part in her first car rally in 1964 at the age of 18.

In 1966, Fontaine began touring car racing and drove an Alfa Romeo Giulia Ti Super 1600 in the Belgian championship. That same year, she contested her first 24 Hours of Spa, finishing 19th overall. In 1969, she switched from Alfa Romeos to Fords, when she received a contract with Ford Belgium. In both 1969 and 1970, she secured the top ranking in the Belgian Touring Car Championship, driving a Ford Escort 1300 GT (and, in 1969, a Ford Lotus Cortina for some races). She was the first woman to win this championship, and, as of 2024, still the only one.

Fontaine's greatest international success was second place in the 1975 24 Hours of Spa. Her partner in the BMW 3.0 CSi was her compatriot Noël van Assche; the race was won by another BMW piloted by Jean Xhenceval, Pierre Dieudonné and Hughes de Fierlant.

Fontaine also competed in the 24 Hours of Le Mans twice, with the all-female teams being successful both times. In the 1974 race she also won the class for sports cars up to 2 litres displacement, finishing 17th; in the 1975 race she finished 11th overall.

In 2016, Fontaine published her autobiography, Ma passion, covering her twelve years as a racing driver.

== Record ==
=== Le Mans ===
Year	Team	Vehicle	Teammate	Teammate	Placement	Reason for retirement
1974	(Belgium) Ecurie Seiko	Chevron B23	(Belgium) Christine Beckers	(France) Marie Laurent	17th place and class victory	
1975	(France) Anne-Charlotte Verney	Porsche 911 Carrera RS	(France) Anne-Charlotte Verney	(France) Corinne Tarnaud	11th place	
