= List of female Indianapolis 500 drivers =

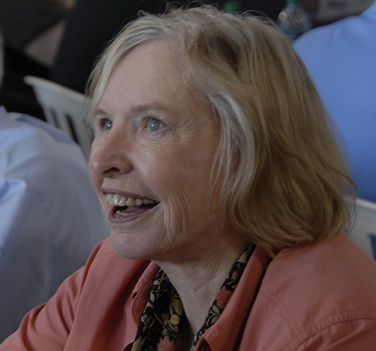
Janet Guthrie qualified for the Indianapolis 500 for the first time in 1977.

This is a list of female motor racing drivers who have entered an Indianapolis 500 race. Ten women racing drivers have officially entered at least once, with Janet Guthrie being the first. Sarah Fisher has the most career starts with nine, and Danica Patrick has the best result with a third place in 2009. Lyn St. James, Patrick, and Simona de Silvestro have all won the Rookie of the Year Award.

== History ==
Female participation of most sorts at Indianapolis was discouraged and essentially disallowed throughout the first several decades of competition. As such, female reporters were not even allowed in the pit area until 1971. At the time, journalist Denise McCluggage was notably one of the first to challenge that antiquated norm.

A number of female owners/sponsors participated in some capacity throughout the first several decades, and off-the-track duties were common. While not behind the wheel of race cars, women were frequently and routinely performers during the pre-race ceremonies, invited as dignitaries to attend the race, and many were employed by the track, working in the ticket office, motel, and other administrative positions. The first female owner to win the race was Maude "M.A." Yagle, who owned the car of 1929 winner Ray Keech.

In 1935, Amelia Earhart was selected to serve as the "Honorary Referee," a ceremonial position for a dignitary at the race. In 1972, Dolly Cole (wife of GM executive Ed Cole), became what is believed to be the first woman ever to ride in the pace car at the start of the race.

In 1974, Johnny Rutherford's wife Betty scored for him in his team's pit area. She was perhaps the first driver's wife to spend the entire race in the pits. Rutherford won the race, and Betty's presence drew some media attention, leading many other wives to follow suit in future years.

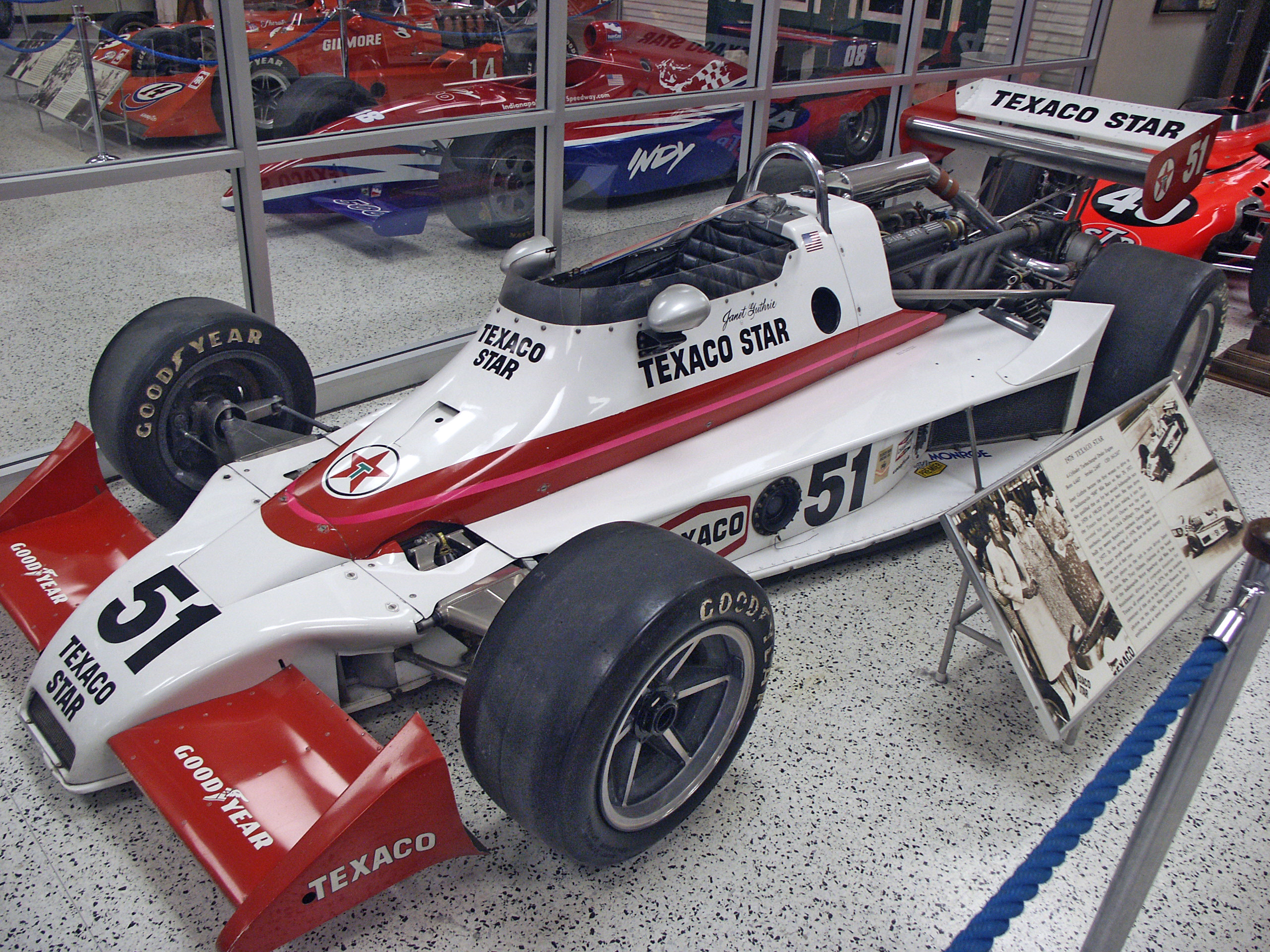
Janet Guthrie's Wildcat 3-DGS, which she drove to ninth place in the 1978 Indianapolis 500.

=== Pioneers ===
The first female to arrive at Indianapolis looking to qualify was Janet Guthrie in 1976. However, she fell short on speed and preparation time. She was able to pass her rookie test, but suffered numerous mechanical problems during the month. On the final day of time trials, Guthrie was loaned a back-up car owned by A. J. Foyt. She quickly reached a suitable speed; however, she did not make an attempt to qualify. Guthrie returned to Indy and qualified for the first time in 1977, and made three total starts. She earned a 9th-place finish in 1978 and later revealed she drove with a broken wrist sustained during a charity tennis match earlier that week. During her career, she received a mixed welcome among the competitors and fans, but was mostly viewed in a positive light by the media. Her experiences were at times frustrating, as setbacks and difficulties ranged from engine troubles to the total lack of female restrooms in the garage area at the time.

In the early 1980s, Desiré Wilson became the next woman to try to make the race, but she failed to qualify. Lyn St. James entered the 1992 race driving for Dick Simon Racing. Due to a services contract with Ford, St. James was initially relegated to the older, under-powered Cosworth DFX engine, and she had trouble getting up to speed. Later in the month, the team secured a Chevrolet engine, and St. James recorded a qualifying speed of over 220 mph. After starting 27th, she finished in 11th place and was named the Rookie of the Year. Overall, she made seven career starts, qualifying 6th in 1994. St. James never managed to finish in the top ten. In 1997, she was running 9th with eleven laps to go when she was taken out by another car in a crash. St. James entered every year from 1992 to 2000, qualifying each time except 1998–1999.

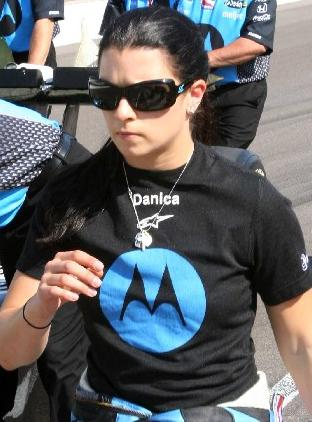
Danica Patrick on Pole Day at Indy, 2007

=== 21st century ===
In 2000, two female drivers (St. James and Sarah Fisher) started the race, the first time multiple women qualified for the same race. At least two started every race between 2007 and 2015. Since 2001, seven women (five of them international drivers) have started the 500.

Before 2005, Guthrie held the record for best finish in the race. That year, Danica Patrick, made her Indianapolis debut, qualifying 4th. She led 19 laps, finished in 4th place, and was named Rookie of the Year. In 2008, she was the first female winner of an IndyCar race when she won at Twin Ring Motegi in Japan. She bettered her record in 2009, finishing 3rd, and also led laps in the Centennial Race in 2011. As of 2017, she is also the first female driver to have led laps in the Indianapolis 500, the Daytona 500, and the Coca-Cola 600.

In 2010, four women (Patrick, Fisher, Ana Beatriz, and Simona de Silvestro) started the race, while a fifth (Milka Duno) failed to qualify. Patrick finished 6th, and de Silvestro received the Rookie of the Year award. Four women also started in 2011, and three of them finished the race. Four women qualified for the 2013 500.

In 2020, no female drivers were on the official entry list. It marked the first time since 1999 that there would not be a female driver in the starting lineup. The 2020 race also marked the first time since 1991 that not a single female driver was entered. Pippa Mann, who raced her seventh 500 in 2019, did not enter the 2020 race; because of the COVID-19 pandemic, she was unable to secure corporate sponsorship, so lacked the funds needed to sustain an IndyCar season.

=== Starting command ===
Traditionally, the starting command for the race has been "Gentlemen, start your engines!" When female drivers are competing, the call has been amended to "Lady and Gentlemen..." or "Ladies and Gentlemen..."

In 1977, a controversy hovered over the starting command, after Janet Guthrie qualified for the race. Speedway officials did not want to alter the traditional phrase. After complaints and consideration, on race morning, Tony Hulman recited the following:

In company with the first lady ever to qualify at Indianapolis, gentlemen, start your engines.

In 2017 and 2018, Tony George recited the call as "Drivers, start your engines," but reverted to "Lady and Gentlemen..." for the 2019 race. In 2020, with no women entered in the race, Roger Penske reverted to "Drivers, start your engines."

== Drivers ==
Name	Country	First	Last	Entries	Starts	Best start	Best finish	Wins	Top 10
Janet Guthrie	United States	1977	1980	5	3	14	9	0	1
Desiré Wilson	South Africa	1982	1984	3	-	-	-	-	-
Amber Furst*	United States	1983		-	-	-	-	-	-
Lyn St. James	United States	1992	2000	9	7	6	11	0	0
Sarah Fisher	United States	2000	2010	9	9	9	17	0	0
Danica Patrick	United States	2005	2018	8	8	4	3	0	6
Milka Duno	Venezuela	2007	2010	4	3	27	19	0	0
Simona de Silvestro	Switzerland	2010	2021	6	6	18	14	0	0
Ana Beatriz Figueiredo	Brazil	2010	2013	4	4	13	15	0	0
Pippa Mann	United Kingdom	2011	2019	8	7	22	16	0	0
Katherine Legge	United Kingdom	2012	2026	5	5	26	22	0	0

=== Notes ===
- Amber Furst attempted to enter in 1983, but her entry was denied due to lack of experience, and she was not allowed to participate in the rookie orientation program.

=== By country ===
Country	Drivers	Entries	Starts	Top 10	Wins
Brazil	1	4	4	0	0
South Africa	1	3	0	0	0
Switzerland	1	5	5	0	0
United Kingdom	2	12	11	0	0
United States	4	31	27	7	0
Venezuela	1	4	3	0	0

== Female records ==
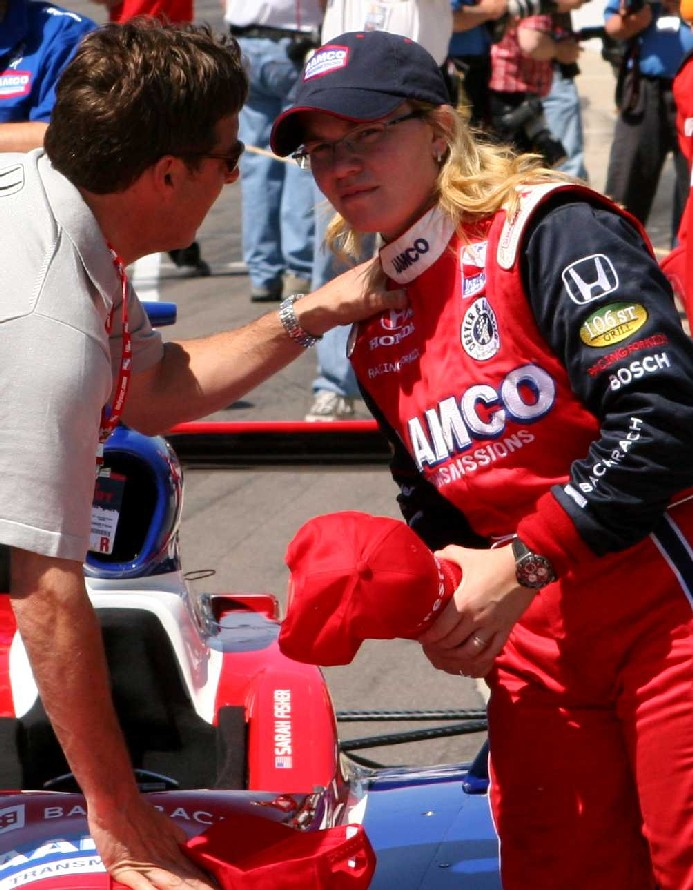
Sarah Fisher in 2007

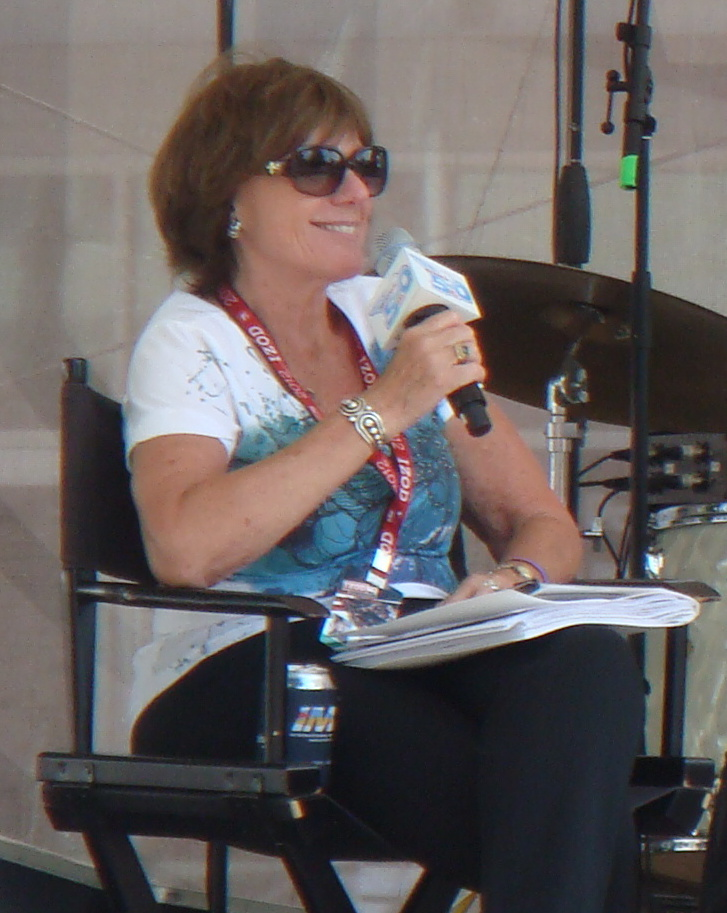
Lyn St. James

- Most career starts
  - 9: Sarah Fisher (2000–2004, 2007–2010)
  - 8: Danica Patrick (2005–2011, 2018)
  - 7: Lyn St. James (1992–1997, 2000)
  - 7: Pippa Mann (2011, 2013–2017, 2019)
- Best starting position
  - 4th: Danica Patrick (2005)
  - 5th: Danica Patrick (2008)
  - 6th: Lyn St. James (1994)
- Best finishing position
  - 3rd: Danica Patrick (2009)
  - 4th: Danica Patrick (2005)
  - 6th: Danica Patrick (2010)
- Most laps led, career
  - 29: Danica Patrick (19 - 2005, 10 - 2011)
- Most female drivers in the starting field
  - 4: 2010 (Danica Patrick, Sarah Fisher, Ana Beatriz, Simona de Silvestro)
  - 4: 2011 (Danica Patrick, Ana Beatriz, Simona de Silvestro, Pippa Mann)
  - 4: 2013 (Simona de Silvestro, Ana Beatriz, Pippa Mann, Katherine Legge)
- Fastest 4-lap qualifying average, female driver
  - 231.070 mph: Katherine Legge (2023)
- Fastest 1-lap qualifying speed, female driver
  - 231.627 mph: Katherine Legge (2023)
- Female Rookie of the Year winners
  - Lyn St. James (1992)
  - Danica Patrick (2005)
  - Simona de Silvestro (2010)
- Oldest female started an Indy 500
  - Lyn St. James 53y 76d (2000)
- Youngest female started an Indy 500
  - Sarah Fisher 19y 237d (2000)

== Other notable women at Indianapolis ==
Upon the death of Tony Hulman in 1977, his wife, Mary Fendrich Hulman, became chairman of the Indianapolis Motor Speedway. When she retired in 1988, her daughter, Mari Hulman George, took over and held the position until 2016.

There have been several female car owners at the Indianapolis 500. The first and only female car owner to win was Maude "M.A." Yagle, who owned the 1929 race winning car for driver Ray Keech. Other notable female owners include Mari Hulman George (who owned the car of husband Elmer George) and former driver Sarah Fisher.

The first professional female competition at the Indianapolis Motor Speedway was not an automobile race, but the LPGA 500 Ladies Classic in 1968. It was played at the Speedway Golf Course.

Four women (Mishael Abbott, Cyndie Allemann, Ana Beatriz, and Pippa Mann) have participated in the Freedom 100, a Firestone Indy Lights race held at IMS on the Friday before the 500. Beatriz had a best finish of 5th in 2008, and Mann won the pole for the event in 2010.

Angela Ashmore was part of Marcus Ericsson's race winning crew at the 2022 Indianapolis 500, as an assistant race engineer. She is believed to be the only female crew member to win the Indianapolis 500.

Twice, a woman has driven the pace car at the start of the race: Elaine Irwin Mellencamp (2001) and Robin Roberts (2010). Prior to that, in 1972, Dolly Cole (wife of GM executive Ed Cole), rode as a passenger in the pace car. At the time, it was common for celebrities and dignitaries to ride as passengers in the pace car, and Cole is believed to be the first woman ever to do so.

Three female drivers have ever attempted to qualify for NASCAR's Brickyard 400, the other major event at the Indianapolis Motor Speedway oval. In 2001, Shawna Robinson attempted, but failed to qualify. The NASCAR Nationwide Series came to the track for the first time in 2012 with the Indiana 250. Two women (Danica Patrick and Johanna Long) raced in that event. In 2013, Danica Patrick became the first woman to qualify for the Brickyard 400, joining 18 drivers that have competed in both the "500" and "400." Katherine Legge qualified for the event in 2025, becoming the 19th driver to do both the "500" & "400."

=== Female owners/teams ===
Partial list

- Maude "M.A." Yagle – 1929–1932; won the 1929 race with Ray Keech
- Marion Batton – 1929 (widow of Norman Batten)
- Bessie Lee Paoli – 1952–1953
- Mari Hulman – 1962–1963 (Elmer George)
- Lydia Laughrey (Steve Chassey, 1987)
- Sarah Fisher Hartman Racing (2008–2014)
- Paretta Autosport (2021)

== See also ==
- List of female Formula One drivers
- List of female 24 Hours of Le Mans drivers
- List of female NASCAR drivers
- List of female World Rally Championship drivers
- List of female racing drivers
