= 1974 24 Hours of Le Mans =

42nd 24 Hours of Le Mans endurance race

Previous: 1973	Next: 1975
Index: Races | Winners

The 1974 24 Hours of Le Mans was the 42nd Grand Prix of Endurance, and took place on 15 and 16 June 1974. It was the fifth round of the 1974 World Championship for Makes. After Alfa Romeo had won the first race of the season at Monza, it had been Matra all the way and they came to Le Mans as firm favourites for a third consecutive outright victory, especially after Alfa Romeo withdrew its cars just before raceweek.

In a fairly lacklustre race, the Matra of Henri Pescarolo and Gérard Larrousse led virtually from start to finish for their second successive victory. It was also the third in a row for Pescarolo and the Matra team. The race was enlivened on Sunday morning when the leading car was delayed for a long time by engine and gearbox troubles. But such was the lead they had built up that they were not headed. Second place, six laps back was the works-supported Martini Racing Porsche 911 Carrera RSR trubo of Gijs van Lennep and Herbert Müller. Third went to another Matra of Jean-Pierre Jabouille and François Migault.

The Group 4 (GTS) category was a battle between the 3-liter Porsche RSR and the V12 Ferrari. It was won by the French-privateer Ferrari of Cyril Grandet and Dominique Bardini as the leading Porsches fell out with problems.

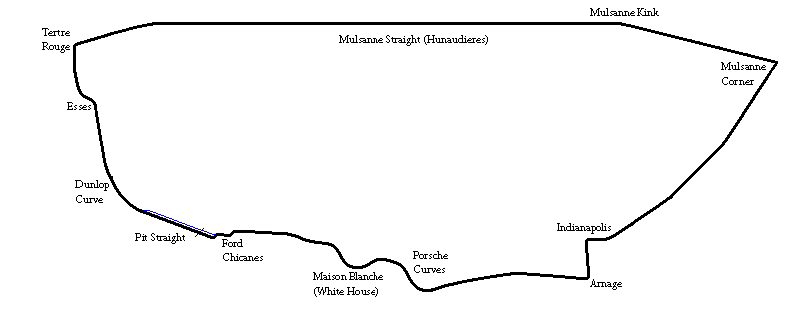
Le Mans in 1974

== Regulations ==
There was negligible change to the regulations this year. The Automobile Club de l'Ouest (ACO) reduced the eligible classes back to six, removing the intermediate divisions of Group 2 and 5. Qualification was tightened, such that each driver, not just each car, had to be within 133% of the fastest times of the top three different car types.

Modern Motor magazine reported at the time that the event cost near to £1 million to hold. Of that, most was paid by Chrysler-France (£500000) and the French government (£300000) with the rest coming from sponsorship. It also noted the declining interest in the racing formula by the manufacturers and fans alike. John Wyer had noted that it cost more than a full season of Formula One to put one of his cars on the grid.

== Entries ==
The fuel crisis triggered by the 1973 Yom Kippur War in the Middle East had dramatically affected motor-racing, including the cancellation of the 24 Hours of Daytona and the 12 Hours of Sebring. The lack of interest in the 3-litre “universal race-engine” formula was evident and the ACO received only 81 applications, and just 50 turned up for qualification on race-week. Ferrari had quit Sports cars at the end of 1973 to focus on Formula One and Autodelta, the Alfa Romeo works team, again withdrew this time just days before the event. This left only eleven works entries, all from Group 5. This year there were six female drivers across three teams, the most since 1938's six female starters.

Category	Sports-Prototype Group 5	Special GT Groups 4	Special Touring Group 2	Total Entries
Large-engines >2.0L classes	24	22	4	45
Medium-engines < 2.0L classes	10	0	0	5
Total cars	34	22	4	60

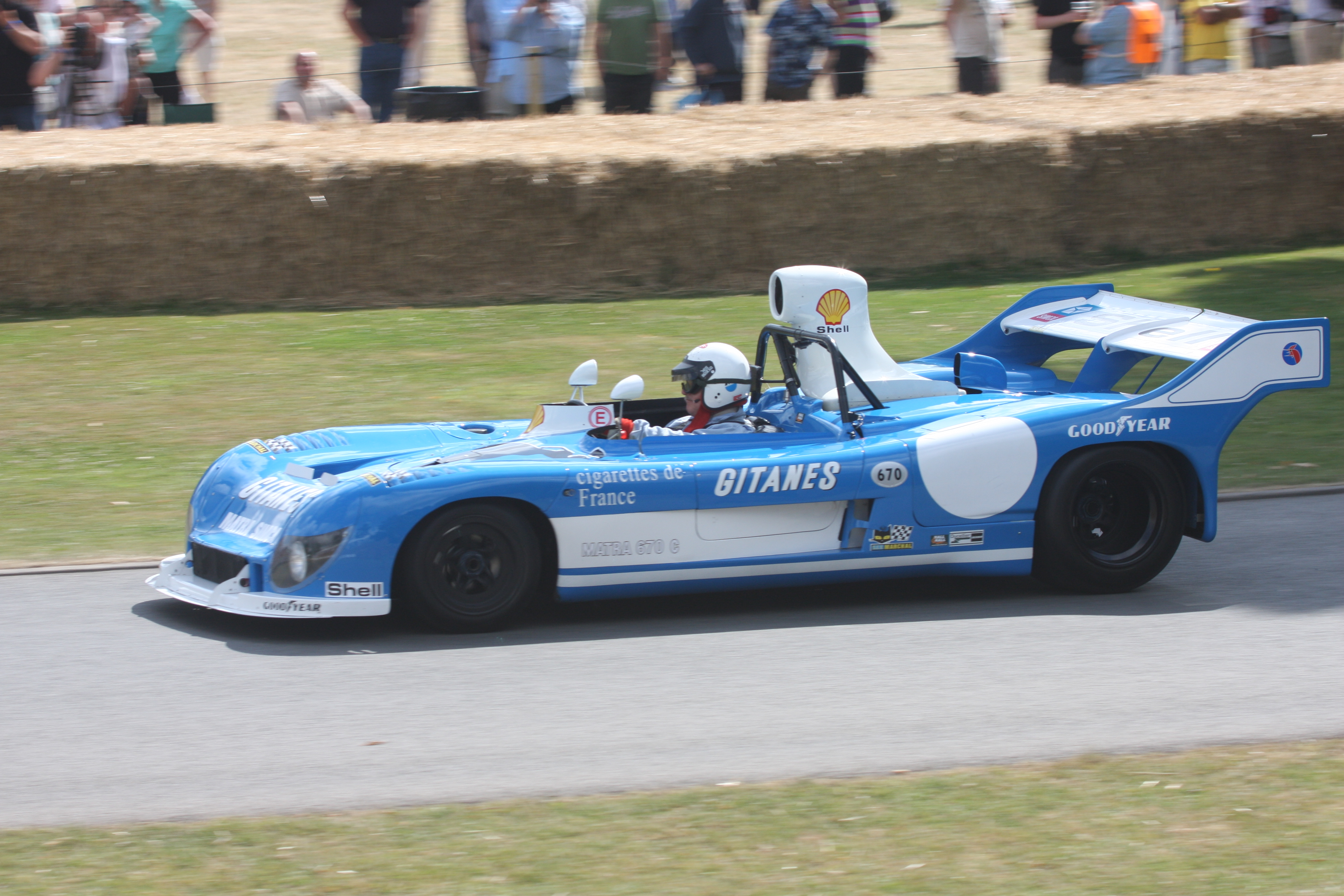
Matra-Simca MS670C

With the non-appearance of the Alfa Romeo works team, Matra became the strong favourites. They arrived confident, holding a firm command of the Manufacturers’ Championship, with a strong 4-car line-up. Three of them were the long-tail MS670B, while the fourth chassis was modified with side radiators allowing a more aerodynamic nose. It was called the MS680 and driven by Jean-Pierre Beltoise/Jean-Pierre Jarier. Although slower on the straights it made up time being quicker through the corners. The others were also manned by all-French driver lines-ups, including the 1973 race-winners Henri Pescarolo/Gérard Larrousse and Jean-Pierre Jaussaud/Bob Wollek/José Dolhem, Jean-Pierre Jabouille/François Migault. The V12 engines got tuned down to 460 bhp to better preserve them, but still gave about 320 kp/h (200 mph).

In Alfa Romeo's absence, Matra's biggest challenger would be from John Wyer’s Gulf Research Racing. The company had dropped the Mirage name and the new car was called the Gulf GR7 designed by Len Bailey, a much lighter version of the M6, but still 40 kg heavier than the Matras. Although the Cosworth V8 (with 450 bhp) gave away acceleration torque to the Matra V12, reliability would be the biggest concern although they had traded up to stronger ZF gearboxes. Two cars were at Le Mans, driven by team regulars Derek Bell/Mike Hailwood and joined by Vern Schuppan/Reine Wisell.

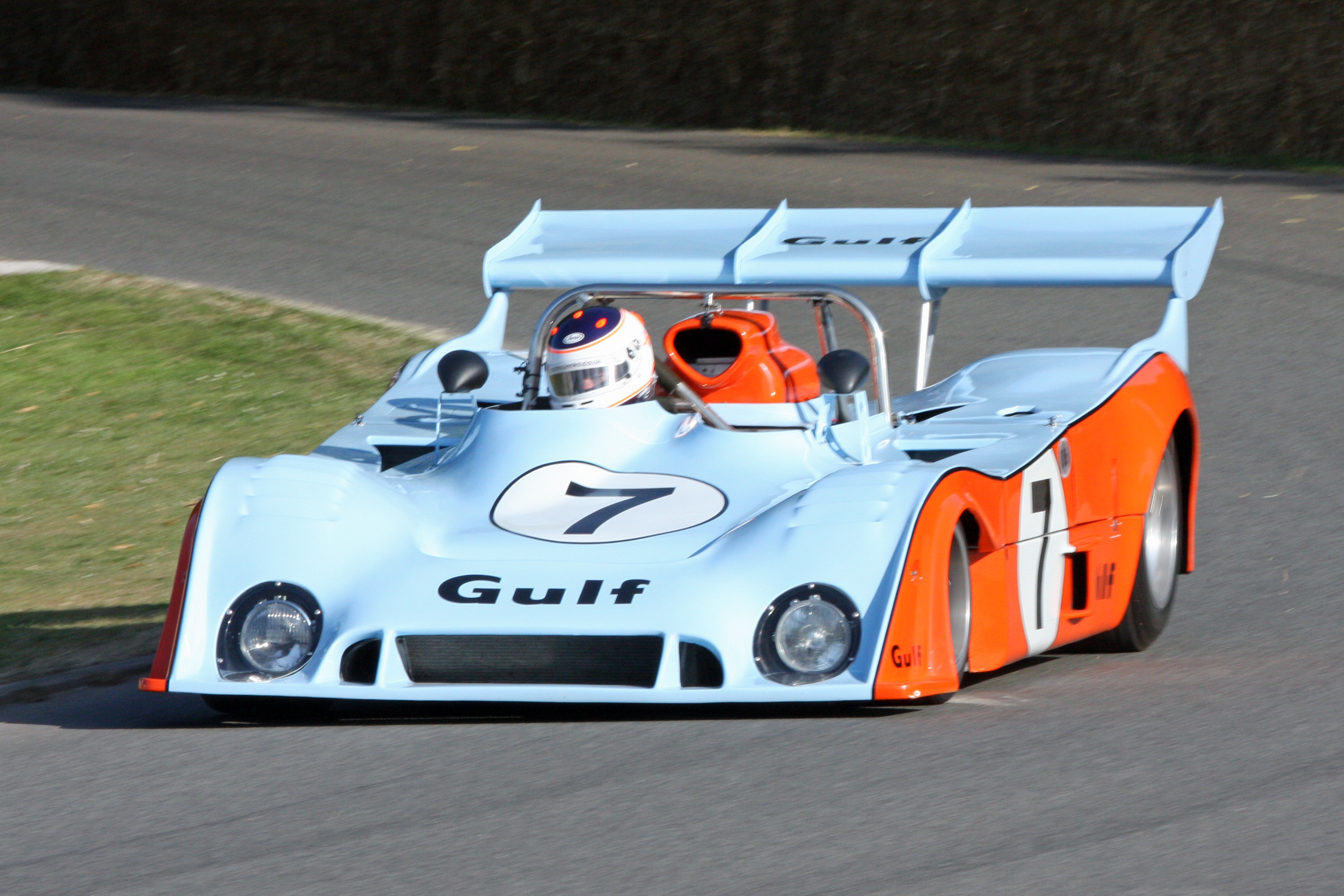
Gulf GR7

After a successful foray into the Can-Am scene, Porsche returned to Sports-car racing this year. The Martini-sponsored works team bought the evolution of the Carrera RSR. It was now powered by a new 2142cc flat-6 engine, augmented by the exhaust-driven KKK (Kühnle, Kopp & Kausch) turbo used in their Can-Am cars, that pushed out 490 bhp (and was equivalent to 2999cc using the x1.4 equivalency). It also featured improved aerodynamics (front spoiler, wider wheel arches, full rear wing) and upgraded transmission and braking which all made them slightly quicker than the Matras in a straight line. The two cars were driven by Gijs van Lennep/Herbert Müller and Manfred Schurti/Helmut Koinigg. There were also older Porsches in the Group 5 field: including a non-turbo RSR special from Mexican Héctor Rebaque and two 908/02s returning from the previous year run by Swiss André Wicky and Ecuadorian Guillermo Ortega.

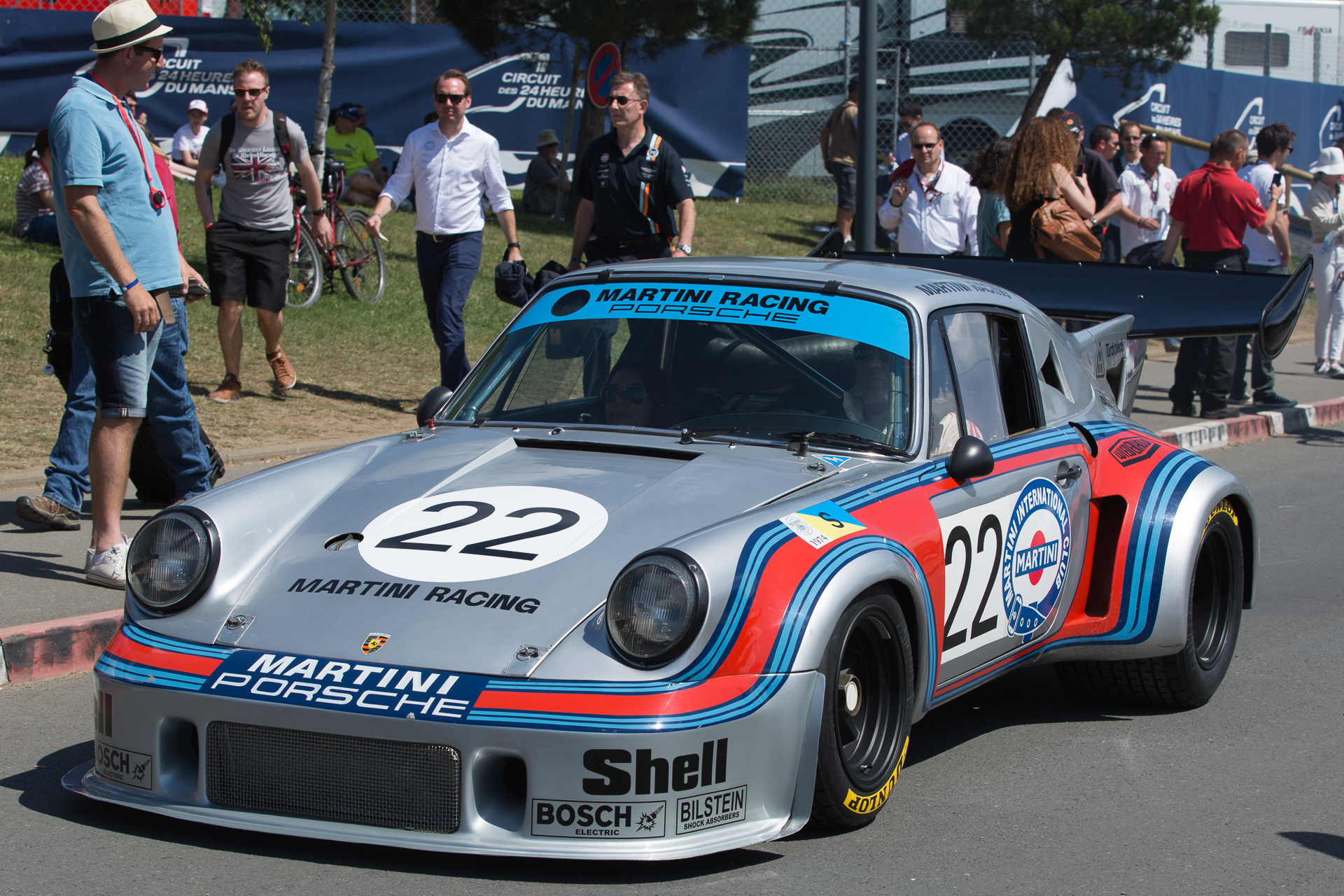
Porsche 911 RSR Turbo

Guy Ligier arrived with a much-improved version of his JS2 sports car, still running in the prototype class. Designer Michel Têtu had done much with the aerodynamics including a big rear aerofoil and flared wheel arches allowing wider tyres. The Maserati engine had been developed to put out 300 bhp. The team was also encouraged by finishing second in the two heats of the March Testing Weekend race, and being declared overall winner. This year the team-owner was not racing, and the two cars were driven by veteran Guy Chasseuil with Michel Leclère, and Jacques Laffite with Alain Serpaggi.

There were also several one-off prototype specials: Alain de Cadenet was back at Le Mans, having fixed the aerodynamic problems that plagued him the year before. It was now in British racing green without its Duckhams Oil sponsorship. However, after being injured in a motorcycle accident, his place alongside Chris Craft was taken by McLaren and Cosworth-engine developer John Nicholson. A new Lola, the T284 (also running a Cosworth engine), was entered by Michel Dupont Racing alongside his Chevron in the 2-litre category. Unable to secure a new 312PB from the factory in 1971, the North American Racing Team (NART) had developed their own spyder version of the 312P. This was subsequently developed in-house to PB-specification in 1972 and arrived at this year's race for Jean-Claude Andruet/Teodoro Zeccoli. The successor to the Dino 246 was the 308 GT4 and NART also prepared a special racing version using engine components taken from the 512BB and 365 GTB/4. The 3-litre engine now pushed out 250 bhp, capable of 285 kp/h (175 mph). The Japanese Sigma rotary returned with an updated model, and now with stronger financial backing from Mazda. Their drivers included the debut race for future Le Mans stalwart Yojiro Terada.

Once again there was a small turnout for the S2.0 class. One of the Chevrons featured the first all-female driver line-up since 1951, led by Belgian Christine Beckers. After getting frustrated with the unreliability of the 2-litre racing engines, French privateer Fred Stalder set up his own company, Société Racing Organisation Course (ROC) to build engines. His first engine, designed by Mario Illien and based on a Chrysler-Simca block, could develop 280 bhp and was put into his Lola T292 as well as a French GRAC car.

The Group 4 GT category would be a battle between Ferrari and Porsche. NART had three of the five 365 GTB/4 “Daytona” entries alongside Charles Pozzi, the French importer who had won the previous year's GT prize (using Raymond Touroul's entry-card). With Porsche's refocus on production racing, they had manufactured the requisite 1000 copies of the Carrera RS cars to get homologation in Group 3. The Group 4 RSR version was very popular with privateers and no less than 13 arrived for the race. Cars included the now-regular team-entries from Kremer and Gelo (West Germany), ASA-Cachia and Claude Buchet (France), Porsche Club Romand and Claude Haldi (Switzerland), Ecurie Francorchamps of Belgium and the Spanish Escuderia Montjuïch. Henri Greder again had his Corvette, now starting to show its age, and the Wicky team also entered a De Tomaso Pantera.

With the withdrawal of the Ford and BMW works teams because of reduced racing budgets, this year the Group 2 class comprised just four entries: two BMWs for the Italian Jolly Club team and Frenchman Jean-Claude Aubriet (giving up his Corvette), the Ford Capri of the Shark Team and Claude Buchet's Mazda twin-rotary RX-3.

== Practice ==
The Alfa Romeos had been the fastest cars at the March test weekend, with Arturo Merzario recording a 3:31.0, but then they failed to arrive. So, unsurprisingly, the Matras were the fastest cars in qualification. Pescarolo got pole position as early as Wednesday night, with a lap of 3:35.8 and teammate Jarier in the new MS680 claimed second on Thursday with a 3:36.8. The Gulfs were third and fourth, Schuppan ahead of Bell with the other two Matras next. There was then a sizeable eight-second gap back to Müller's Porsche turbo and Craft in the De Cadenet (both recording 3:52.4). The Ligiers really impressed themselves, qualifying 10th and 12th on the grid with Chasseuil a full 27 seconds faster than the previous year proving the new aero pack was working and the run at the Test Weekend was no fluke.

The Lola-ROC was quickest of the 2-litre class with 4:07.9 (14th). Fastest GT was the Kremer-Porsche (15th with 4:11.3) not far ahead of the Jolly Club Group 2 ex-works BMW (17th with 4:14.2). Disappointments were the NART-Ferrari specials with the 312P recording 4:18.0 and the 308 GT4 down in 38th with 4:25.3. The big old Corvette was in the middle of the GT-pack (4:24.7 for 36th) while the De Tomaso was last qualifier with a sluggish 4:43.6. Of the two rotaries, the Sigma had a number of problems during practice and its 4:20.4 was nine seconds slower than the year before; while the RX-3 was the only car too slow to qualify.

== Race ==
=== Start ===
Once again, like the previous year's race, the sunshine in race week became dark clouds on race-day. Henri Pescarolo moved into the lead from the start but Jarier overtook him at Mulsanne corner just as the rain started on the first lap. But it didn’t last and no-one came in to change tyres. By the fourth lap, Matra were running 1-2-3-4 when Schuppan had already bought his Gulf in to change sparkplugs and Jabouille and Jaussaud had overtaken Bell in the other Gulf. One of the NART Ferraris left its braking too late and clouted both barriers at the Esses putting it out. Chasseuil also brought the leading Ligier in for a plug change early on.

Pescarolo retook the lead and the Matras kept their positions beyond the first driver changes, a lap ahead of the Gulf. Schuppan's day never improved as the other Gulf's ongoing issues culminated in a broken CV-joint after three hours, stranding Wisell out on the track. In fact a number of cars had early mechanical issues, spreading the field wide apart. The GT battle was very close, with the Buchet Porsche running just ahead of the Montjuïch, Kremer and ASA-Cachia cars. But the troubles that were to afflict most of the Porsches started early when Ballot-Lena and Haldi brought the leading two cars in for repairs. Then in the fourth hour, just as Jarier blasted out of the pits to start his second stint, he collided with the GT-leading Kremer Porsche (leaving twin 22m lines of rubber as it tried to stop). While the Matra was losing 45 minutes getting repaired, Jabouille's car also came in the pits with water leaking from its engine. When the remaining Gulf also broke its CV joint (fortunately, within coasting distance of the pits, but dropping it to 12th after 45 minutes), it was the turbo Porsches that moved up to 3rd and 5th, split by the De Cadenet now running well after an initial delay to fix a loose wheel.

=== Night ===
At 11pm, the engine of Schurti/Koinigg's Porsche, running 5th, blew up on the Mulsanne Straight. Such was the smoke trail that officials initially put its retirement down to a fire. Within the hour, the Matras of Jarier (12th) and Wollek (2nd) also lost their engines. By 1am Pescarolo had a 6-lap lead over the Müller/van Lennep Porsche, with the De Cadenet four laps further back in third. After its delays, the Gulf of Bell/Hailwood had got back up to fourth, ahead of the Gelo Porsche of Loos/Schickentanz/Barth (leading the GT class in a surprising fifth overall) and the Jabouille/Migault Matra also coming back through the field. Consistency had got the Romand Porsche up to seventh ahead of the Pozzi Ferrari.

Then shortly after 1.30am Craft brought the De Cadenet in with suspect handling. As he was leaving a suspension bolt broke but, not being allowed to reverse up the pitlane, Craft had to spend half an hour changing the steering arm himself. After some cautious laps and further repairs he resumed in 11th place and carried on through the night. At 2am, the Gelo Porsche (now running 4th) was out with engine problems – when a loose screw fell into the distributor.

So by halftime at 4am, Pescarolo/Larrousse had done 179 laps, with a comfortable lead over the Porsche (172) and the Gulf (166). Jabouille/Migault had fought back up to fourth (165 laps). Just two laps back the Swiss Romand Porsche was fifth, pursued by the Pozzi Ferrari and the Francorchamps Porsche. The NART Ferraris were eighth (312P) and tenth (365 GT) with the second Gelo Porsche splitting them.

=== Morning ===
Just as dawn came at 5.30am, the De Cadenet's suspension broke again. However, this time Nicholson was travelling at speed down the pit straight and it slammed him into the pit-barriers and slid 200 metres down the road. Nicholson was able to get out unhurt. The Jolly Club BMW had been the fastest of the Group 2 cars in practice but had been slowed in the very first hour with a gearbox issue. Having driven back through the field up to 17th, it was forced to retire just after dawn when the engine overheated. The Ford Capri leading the class broke its clutch after 7am while running 13th overall.

The back-and-forth Porsche-Ferrari battle in GT got clearer at 7am when the 5th-placed Romand Porsche had to spend a half-hour repairing a universal joint, handing the class lead back to the Pozzi Ferrari. After a four-hour engine rebuild, the Sigma got back into the race, much to the appreciation of the crowd. Although unlikely to be classified, the team were determined to get to the finish.

At 8am, the trouble-free run of the leading Matra ended when Larrousse bought the car in with a misfire. Several stops were needed to fix the issue, costing three-quarters of an hour, but they were able to keep their lead. The Gulf then also lost almost 45 minutes fixing its starter motor, dropping to fourth. Around 10am the Porsche developed a steering problem and then lost all but its fourth and fifth gears. Running around 40 seconds a lap slower, it fell eleven laps behind the leading Matra.

Then just before 11am, Pescarolo had a gearbox failure. The Porsche-designed Matra gearbox problem was easy to repair, but it still took 45 minutes. When Larrousse resumed, their 11-lap lead had been cut to just one.

=== Finish and post-race ===
However, from then on, the Matra ran smoothly and between them Pescarolo and Larrousse rebuilt their lead over the ailing Porsche. Their pursuers were in damage-control mode, just trying to limp to the finish. The Gelo Porsche's engine finally gave out with less than three hours to go. Even though rain briefly returned in the last hour, Larrousse took the chequered flag a full six laps ahead of Müller and van Lennep. The remaining Matra of Jabouille/Migault, which had kept its third place since daybreak, was a further ten laps behind with a four-lap margin over the Bell/Hailwood Gulf. Both cars had endured troubles right through the race, and every pit-stop needed attention – extra water for the Matra's leaking engine and grease added to the Gulf's fragile CV-joint.

First GT home from a close race-long battle was the Charles Pozzi Ferrari 365 of Cyril Grandet/Dominique Bardini finishing fifth. They had had a very reliable run, spending only 30 minutes in the pits over the whole race. Sixth was the NART Ferrari of Dave Heinz/Alain Cudini that had managed to chase down and pass the ailing Porsche Club Romand car of Chenevière / Zbinden / Dubois in the last quarter-hour.

Jacques Laffite and Alain Serpaggi gave Ligier its best finish to date coming in eighth, despite a fuel-fire at the last pit-stop. Ninth was the NART Ferrari 312 special, having endured six broken throttle cables. The sole surviving Group 2 car was Jean-Claude Aubriet's BMW finishing fifteenth. Likewise, there was only a single finisher in the S-2000 class. The all-female crew in the third Dupont entry ran a conservative race but outlasted all their opposition to finish 17th and, perhaps more importantly, prove that the fragile engines could run 24 hours. They finished ahead of the Corvette of Marie-Claude Beaumont, which had numerous issues and ran 49 laps less than it had completed the year before.

Technically, the Matra mechanics had replaced the gearbox housing on the winning car, which was against regulations. The officials decided not to disqualify the car unless someone protested, and no team did. It was a Porsche gearbox. Henri Pescarolo became only the third driver to win three Le Mans in a row, after Woolf Barnato (1928–30) and Olivier Gendebien (1960-62). Having won Le Mans those three years in a row, and then the World Championship (with nine wins out of ten), Matra announced its retirement from racing at the end of the season with mission accomplished.

== Official results ==
=== Finishers ===
Results taken from Quentin Spurring's book, officially licensed by the ACO Class winners are in Bold text.

Pos	Class	No.	Team	Drivers	Chassis	Engine	Tyre	Laps
1	**S** **3.0**	**7**	**(France) Équipe Gitanes**	**(France) Henri Pescarolo** **(France) Gérard Larrousse**	Matra-Simca MS670C	Matra 3.0L V12	G	338
2	S 3.0	22	(Germany) Martini Racing Porsche System	(Netherlands) Gijs van Lennep (Switzerland) Herbert Müller	Porsche 911 Carrera RSR Turbo	Porsche 2.1L F6 Turbo	D	332
3	S 3.0	9	(France) Équipe Gitanes	(France) Jean-Pierre Jabouille (France) François Migault	Matra-Simca MS670C	Matra 3.0L V12	G	322
4	S 3.0	11	(United Kingdom) Gulf Research Racing	(United Kingdom) Derek Bell (United Kingdom) Mike Hailwood	Gulf GR7	Cosworth DFV 3.0L V8	F	318
5	**GTS**; **5.0**	**71**	**(France) Automobiles Charles Pozzi** **(France) R. Touroul**	**(France) Cyril Grandet** **(France) Dominique Bardini**	Ferrari 365 GTB/4	Ferrari 4.4L V12	M	314
6	GTS; 5.0	54	(United States) North American Racing Team	(United States) Dave Heinz (France) Alain Cudini	Ferrari 365 GTB/4	Ferrari 4.4L V12	G	313
7	**GTS**; **3.0**	**66**	**(Switzerland) Porsche Club Romand**	**(Switzerland) Bernard Chenevière** **(Switzerland) Peter Zbinden** **(France) Michel Dubois**	Porsche 911 Carrera RSR	Porsche 3.0L F6	D	313
8	S 3.0	15	(France) Automobiles Ligier	(France) Jacques Laffite (France) Alain Serpaggi	Ligier JS2	Maserati 3.0L V6	M	311
9	S 3.0	1	(United States) North American Racing Team	(France) Jean-Claude Andruet (Italy) Teodoro Zeccoli	NART-Ferrari 312P	Ferrari 3.0L V12	G	299
10	GTS; 3.0	70	(France) ASA Cachia-Bondy	(France) Henri Cachia (France) Raymound Touroul (France) Dennis Rua	Porsche 911 Carrera RSR	Porsche 3.0L F6	D	289
11	GTS; 5.0	56	(United States) North American Racing Team	(France) Christian Ethuin (France) Lucien Guitteny	Ferrari 365 GTB/4	Ferrari 4.4L V12	G	286
12	GTS; 3.0	69	(Switzerland) C. Haldi (private entrant)	(France) Lucien Negeotte (France) Jean-Pierre Laffeach (France) Jean- François Jaunet	Porsche 911 Carrera RSR	Porsche 3.0L F6	D	277
13	GTS; 3.0	59	(France) P. Mauroy (private entrant)	(France) Pierre Mauroy (France) Anne-Charlotte Verney (France) Martine Rénier	Porsche 911 Carrera RSR	Porsche 2.8L F6	D	277
14	GTS; 3.0	63	(France) J.-C. Lagniez (private entrant)	(France) Jean-Claude Lagniez (France) Gérard Meo	Porsche 911 Carrera RSR	Porsche 3.0L F6	D	275
15	**TS**; **5.0**	**86**	**(France) J.-C. Aubriet** (private entrant)	**(France) Jean-Claude Aubriet** **(France) "Dépnic" (Jean-Claude Depince)**	BMW 3.0 CSL	BMW 3.5L S6	M	270
16	GTS; 5.0	57	(France) M. Mignot (private entrant)	(France) Marcel Mignot (United States) Harry Jones	Ferrari 365 GTB/4	Ferrari 4.4L V12	M	267
17	**S** **2.0**	**30**	**(Switzerland) Michel Dupont Scato** **(Belgium) Écurie Seiko-Scato**	**(Belgium) Christine Beckers** **(Belgium) Yvette Fontaine** **(France) Marie Laurent**	Chevron B23	Cosworth FVC 1790cc S4	F	266
18	**GTS** **+5.0**	**51**	**(France) Greder Racing Team**	**(France) Henri Greder** **(France) Marie-Claude Beaumont**	Chevrolet Corvette C3	Chevrolet 7.0L V8	M	254
19	S 3.0	65	(France) C. Poirot (private entrant)	(France) Christian Poirot (France) Jean Rondeau	Porsche 908/02	Porsche 3.0L F8	D	252
20	GTS; 3.0	73	(Switzerland) Paul Blancpain (United States) Toad Hall Racing	(Switzerland) Paul Blancpain (United States) Michael Keyser (United States) Milt Minter	Porsche 911 Carrera RSR	Porsche 3.0L F6	G	247
N/C *	S 3.0	25	(Japan) Sigma Automotive	(Japan) Yasuhiro Okamoto (Japan) Harukuni Takahashi (Japan) Yojiro Terada	Sigma MC74	Mazda 12A 2-Rotor (2.3L equiv.)	D	156

- 'Note *: Not classified because did not cover sufficient distance (70% of winner’s = 236 laps).

=== Did not finish ===
Pos	Class	No	Team	Drivers	Chassis	Engine	Tyre	Laps	Reason
DNF	GTS; 3.0	72	(Germany) Polifac Gelo Racing Team	(Germany) Jürgen Barth (Germany) Franz Pesch	Porsche 911 Carrera RSR	Porsche 3.0L F6	F	232	Engine (23hr)
DNF	GTS; 3.0	62	(Belgium) Ecurie Francorchamps	(Belgium) Baron Hughes de Fierlandt (United Kingdom) Richard Bond	Porsche 911 Carrera RSR	Porsche 3.0L F6	D	227	Transmission (19hr)
DNF	GTS; 3.0	67	(Switzerland) Porsche Club Romand	(Switzerland) William Vollery (Switzerland) Eric Chapuis (France) Roger Dorchy	Porsche 911 Carrera RSR	Porsche 3.0L F6	D	225	Engine (19hr)
DNF	TS; 5.0	90	(France) Shark Racing Team (private entrant)	(France) Jean-Claude Guérie (United Kingdom) Serge Godard (France) Dominique Fornage	Ford Capri RS	Ford 3.0L V6	D	186	Transmission (16hr)
DNF	S 3.0	10	(United Kingdom) A. de Cadenet (private entrant)	(United Kingdom) Chris Craft (New Zealand) John Nicholson	De Cadenet LM72	Cosworth DFV 3.0L V8	F	168	Accident (15hr)
DNF	TS; 5.0	87	(Italy) Scuderia Jolly Club	(Italy) Martino Finotto (Italy) Carlo Facetti (Germany) Manfred Mohr	BMW 3.0 CSL	BMW 3.5L S6	D	155	Engine (14hr)
DNF	S 2.0	43	(France) Société Racing Organisation Course	(France) Fred Stalder (France) Robert Mieusset (France) François Sérvanin	Lola T292	Simca-ROC 1994cc S4	F	145	Electrics (13hr)
DNF	S 2.0	44	(France) G. Cuynet (private entrant)	(France) Gérard Cuynet (France) Yves Evrard (France) Jean-Louis Gama	Porsche 910	Porsche 1991cc F6	G	143	Out of fuel (17hr)
DNF	GTS; 3.0	64	(Germany) Polifac Gelo Racing Team	(Germany) Georg Loos (Germany) Clemens Schickentanz	Porsche 911 Carrera RSR	Porsche 3.0L F6	F	134	Electrics (14hr)
DNF	S 3.0	17	Ecuador Marlboro Team (private entrant)	(Ecuador) Guillermo Ortega (Ecuador) Fausto Merello (Ecuador) Lothar Ranft	Porsche 908/02K	Porsche 3.0L F8	G	122	Accident (11hr)
DNF	S 3.0	8	(France) Équipe Gitanes	(France) Jean-Pierre Jaussaud (France) Bob Wollek (France) José Dolhem	Matra-Simca MS670B	Matra 3.0L V12	G	120	Engine (9hr)
DNF	GTS; 3.0	61	(France) R. Buchet (private entrant)	(United Kingdom) Vic Elford (France) Claude Ballot-Léna	Porsche 911 Carrera RSR	Porsche 3.0L F6	D	117	Transmission (11hr)
DNF	S 3.0	6	(France) Équipe Gitanes	(France) Jean-Pierre Beltoise (France) Jean-Pierre Jarier	Matra-Simca MS680	Matra 3.0L V12	G	104	Engine (9hr)
DNF	S 3.0	21	(Germany) Martini Racing Porsche System	(Austria) Helmut Koinigg (Liechtenstein) Manfred Schurti	Porsche 911 Carrera RSR Turbo	Porsche 2.1L F6 Turbo	D	87	Engine (8hr)
DNF	S 3.0	14	(France) Automobiles Ligier	(France) Guy Chasseuil (France) Michel Leclère	Ligier JS2	Maserati 3.0L V6	M	82	Engine (9hr)
DNF	GTS; 3.0	68	(Germany) Samson Kremer Racing	(Germany) Erwin Kremer (Germany) Hans Heyer (Switzerland) Paul Keller	Porsche 911 Carrera RSR	Porsche 3.0L F6	D	65	Engine (6hr)
DNF	S 3.0	46	(Mexico) Rebaque-Rojas Racing Team (private entrant)	(Mexico) Héctor Rebaque (Mexico) Guillermo Rojas, Sr (Mexico) Freddy Van Beuren	Porsche 911 Carrera RSR	Porsche 3.0L F6	G	60	Electrics (7hr)
DNF	S 3.0	12	(United Kingdom) Gulf Research Racing	(Australia) Vern Schuppan (Sweden) Reine Wisell	Gulf GR7	Cosworth DFV 3.0L V8	F	49	Engine (5hr)
DNF	S 2.0	23	(France) M. Mamers (private entrant)	(France) Marcel “Max” Mamers (France) Xavier Lapeyre	GRAC MT20	Simca-ROC 1994cc S4	G	45	Transmission (5hr)
DNF	GTS; 3.0	58	(Spain) Escuderia Montjuïch	(Switzerland) Claude Haldi (Spain) José-Marie Fernández (France) Jean-Marc Seguin	Porsche 911 Carrera RSR	Porsche 3.0L F6	D	43	Engine (4hr)
DNF	S 3.0	19	(Switzerland) Wicky Racing Team	(Switzerland) André Wicky (France) Jacques Boucard (France) “Nouvestille” (Louis Cosson)	Porsche 908/02	Porsche 3.0L F8	F	41	Gearbox (6hr)
DNF	S 3.0	28	(Switzerland) Michel Dupont Scato	(Switzerland) Heinz Schulthess (France) Michel Lateste	Lola T280/284	Cosworth DFV 3.0L V8	F	32	Engine (8hr)
DNF	S 3.0	18	(United States) North American Racing Team	(France) Jean-Louis Lafosse (Italy) Giancarlo Gagliardi	Dino 308 GT4 LM	Ferrari 3.0L V8	G	30	Transmission (4hr)
DNF	GTS; 3.0	60	(France) L. Meznarie (private entrant)	(France) Hubert Striebig (France) Hugues Kirschoffer (France) Jean-Louis Chateau	Porsche 911 Carrera RSR	Porsche 3.0L F6	D	23	Accident (4hr)
DNF	GTS +5.0	52	(Switzerland) Wicky Racing Team	(Morocco) Max Cohen-Olivar (Switzerland) Philippe Carron	De Tomaso Pantera	Ford 5.8L V8	F	16	Engine (4hr)
DNF	S 3.0	31	(Spain) Escuderia Tibidabo (private entrant)	(Spain) Francesco Torredemer (Spain) Juan Fernández (France) Bernard Tramont	Porsche 908/03	Porsche 3.0L F8	G	12	Gearbox (3hr)
DNF	GTS; 5.0	55	(United States) North American Racing Team	(France) Jean-Pierre Paoli (France) Alain Couderc	Ferrari 365 GTB/4	Ferrari 4.4L V12	G	4	Accident (2hr)
DNF	S 2.0	27	(Switzerland) Michel Dupont Scato	(Switzerland) Michel Dupont (Switzerland) Gregor Fischer (France) Daniel Brillat	Chevron B23/26	Cosworth FVC 1790cc S4	F	3	Engine (3hr)

=== Did not start ===
Pos	Class	No	Team	Drivers	Chassis	Engine	Tyre	Reason
DNQ	TS; 5.0	98	(France) C. Buchet (private entrant)	(France) Claude Buchet (France) Jean-Paul Agères (France) Frederic Canal	Mazda RX-3 Coupé	Mazda 124A 2-Rotor (2.3L equiv.)	**D**	Did not qualify
DNA	S 3.0	3	(Italy) Autodelta SpA	(Germany) Rolf Stommelen (Italy) Andrea de Adamich	Alfa Romeo Tipo 33TT12	Alfa Romeo 3.0L F12	**F**	Withdrawn
DNA	S 3.0	4	(Italy) Autodelta SpA	(Italy) Arturo Merzario (Italy) Carlo Facetti	Alfa Romeo Tipo 33TT12	Alfa Romeo 3.0L F12	**F**	Withdrawn
DNA	S 3.0	5	(Italy) Autodelta SpA	(Germany) Rolf Stommelen (Italy) Carlo Facetti (Italy) Teodoro Zeccoli	Alfa Romeo Tipo 33TT12	Alfa Romeo 3.0L F12	**F**	Withdrawn
DNA	S 3.0	24	(Italy) Lancia Marlboro Team	(France) Jean-Claude Andruet (Italy) Sandro Munari (Italy) Umberto Maglioli	Lancia Stratos	Ferrari 2.4L V6		Withdrawn
DNA	S 2.0	26	(France) P.-M. Painvin (private entrant)	(France) Pierre-Marie Painvin (France) Lucien Guitteny (France) Guy Fréquelin	GRAC MT20	Simca-JRD 1994cc S4		Withdrawn
DNA	S 2.0	29	(France) R. Touroul (private entrant)	(France) Raymond Touroul	March 74S	BMW 1994cc S4		Withdrawn
DNA	S 2.0	32	(Spain) J. Uriarte (private entrant)	(Spain) José Uriarte (France) Hervé LeGuellec	Lola T292	Cosworth FVC 1790cc S4		Withdrawn
DNA	S 2.0	33	(Switzerland) P. Blancpain (private entrant)	(Switzerland) Paul Blancpain	Chevron B23	Cosworth FVC 1790cc S4		Withdrawn
DNA	S 2.0	34	(France) M.Lateste (private entrant)	(France) Michel Lateste (France) Michel Dufust (France) Robert Nee	A.C.E. PB2	Cosworth FVC 1790cc S4		Withdrawn

=== Class winners ===
Class	Group 5 Sports Winners		Class	Group 4 Special GT Winners		Class	Group 2 Special Touring Winners	
Sports 3000			GTS >5000	#51 Chevrolet Corvette C3	Greder / Beaumont			
Sports 3000	#7 Matra-Simca MS670C	Pescarolo / Larrousse	GTS 5000	#71 Ferrari 365 GTB/4	Grandet / Bardini	TS 5000	#86 BMW 3.0 CSL	Aubriet / Depince
Sports 2000	#30 Chevron B23	Beckers / Fontaine / Laurent	GTS 3000	#66 Porsche 911 Carrera RSR	Chenevière / Zbinden / Dubois			

- Note: setting a new class distance record.

=== Index of Thermal Efficiency ===
For Group 2 and Group 4 cars.

Pos	Class	No	Team	Drivers	Chassis	Score
1	GTS; 5.0	71	(France) Automobiles Charles Pozzi (France) R. Touroul	(France) Cyril Grandet (France) Dominique Bardini	Ferrari 365 GTB/4	1.05
2	GTS; 5.0	54	(United States) North American Racing Team	(United States) Dave Heinz (France) Alain Cudini	Ferrari 365 GTB/4	0.94
3	GTS; 3.0	66	(Switzerland) Porsche Club Romand	(Switzerland) Bernard Chenevière (Switzerland) Peter Zbinden (France) Michel Dubois	Porsche 911 Carrera RSR	0.90
4	TS; 5.0	86	(France) J.-C. Aubriet (private entrant)	(France) Jean-Claude Aubriet (France) "Dépnic" (Jean-Claude Depince)	BMW 3.0 CSL	0.83
5	GTS; 3.0	69	(Switzerland) C. Haldi (private entrant)	(France) Lucien Negeotte (France) Jean-Pierre Laffeach (France) Jean- François Jaunet	Porsche 911 Carrera RSR	0.78
6	GTS; 3.0	63	(France) J.-C. Lagniez (private entrant)	(France) Jean-Claude Lagniez (France) Gérard Meo	Porsche 911 Carrera RSR	0.74
7=	GTS; 3.0	70	(France) ASA Cachia-Bondy	(France) Henri Cachia (France) Raymound Touroul (France) Dennis Rua	Porsche 911 Carrera RSR	0.74
7=	GTS; 3.0	59	(France) P. Mauroy (private entrant)	(France) Pierre Mauroy (France) Anne-Charlotte Verney (France) Martine Rénier	Porsche 911 Carrera RSR	0.74
9	GTS; 5.0	57	(France) M. Mignot (private entrant)	(France) Marcel Mignot (United States) Harry Jones	Ferrari 365 GTB/4	0.69
10	GTS; 5.0	56	(United States) North American Racing Team	(France) Christian Ethuin (France) Lucien Guitteny	Ferrari 365 GTB/4	0.64

- Note: Only the top ten positions are included in this set of standings. A score of 1.00 means meeting the target fuel consumption for the car.

=== Statistics ===
Taken from Quentin Spurring's book, officially licensed by the ACO

- Fastest lap in practice –H.Pescarolo, #7 Matra-Simca MS670C – 3:35.8secs; 227.55 km/h (141.39 mph)
- Fastest lap – J.-P. Jarier, #6 Matra-Simca MS680 – 3:42.7secs; 220.49 km/h (137.01 mph)
- Winning Distance – 4,606.57 km (2,862.39 mi)
- Winner's average speed – 191.96 km/h (119.28 mph)
- Attendance – 200000

=== World Championship for Makes Standings ===
As calculated after Le Mans, Round 5 of 10

Pos	Manufacturer	Points
1	(France) Matra-Simca	80
2	(Italy) Alfa Romeo	50
3	(West Germany) Porsche	49
4	(United Kingdom) Gulf	45
5	(Italy) Ferrari	8
6=	(United Kingdom) Lola	6
6=	(France) Ligier	6
6=	(United Kingdom) Chevron	6
9	(West Germany) BMW	3
10=	(France) Alpine-Renault	1
10=	(Italy) AMS	1

- Note: Only the best 7 of 10 results counted to the final Championship points. The full total earned to date is given in brackets

Citations
