= Marguerite Mareuse =

French racing driver

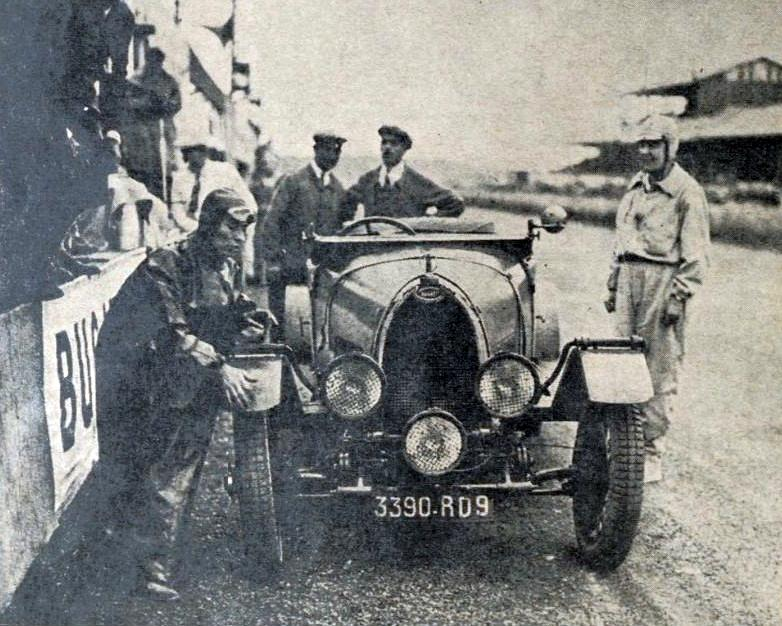
Mareuse with her Bugatti and her co-driver in the pitlane at the 1930 Le Mans race

Marguerite Mareuse (18 April 1889 – 17 September 1964) was a French racing driver.

Born in the Bordeaux region in 1889, the wealthy Mareuse entered her own cars as a privateer, often driving herself.

On 21 June 1930, Mareuse and her co-driver Odette Siko became the first women to compete in the 24 Hours of Le Mans endurance race, competing in Mareuse's Bugatti Type 40. They finished seventh overall, and the team returned together in 1931, but were disqualified due to a refueling violation.

On 17 April 1932, she drove in the fourth Tunis Grand Prix, finishing in fourteenth place overall and sixth in her class. Her car was the last classified finisher; seven drivers retired from the race before the finish and three others failed to start the race.

Mareuse was a member of the Automobile Club féminin de France.
