= Chevron B23 =

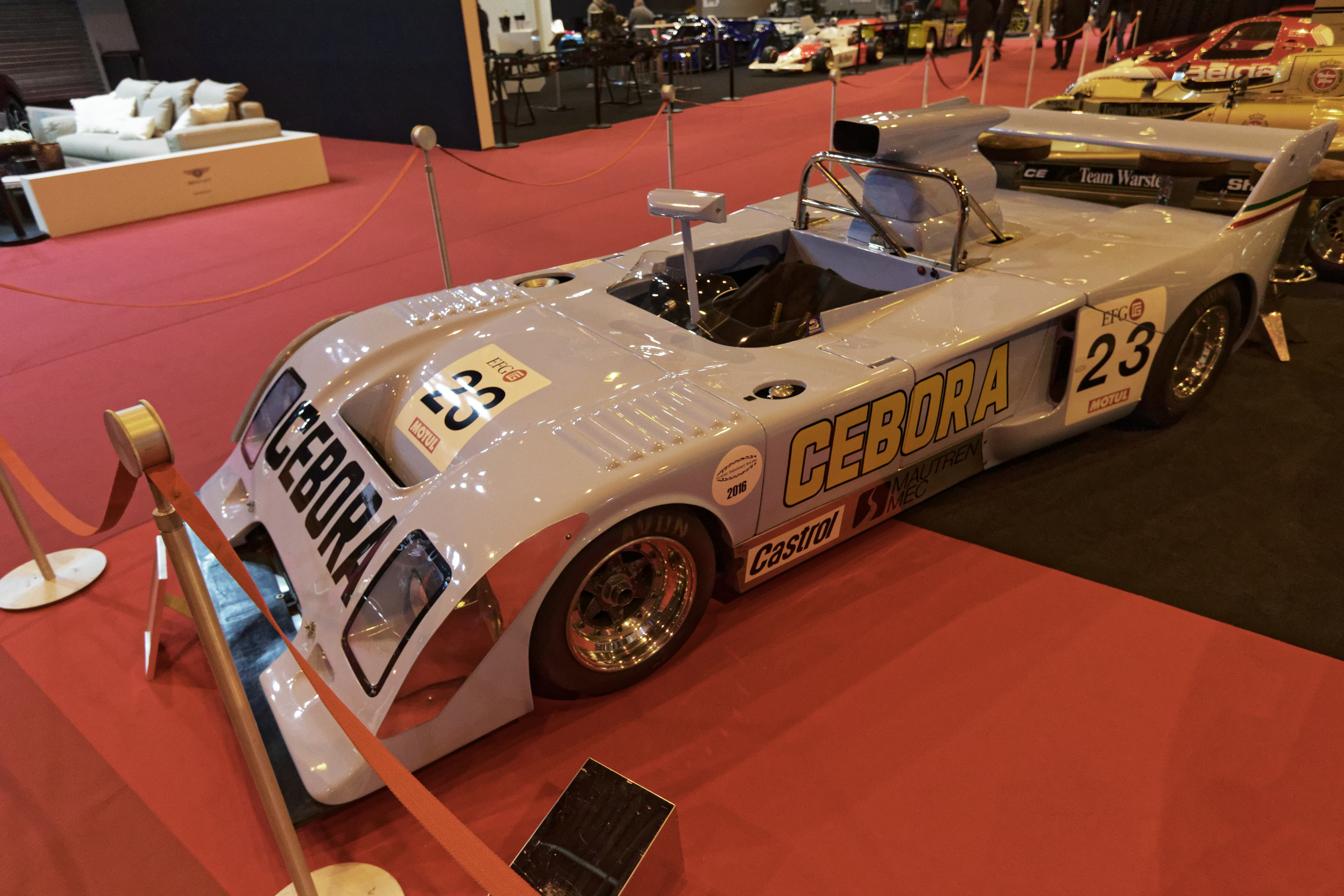
- Category: Group 5
- Constructor: Chevron
- Designer(s): Derek Bennett
- Production: 1973
- Predecessor: Chevron B21
- Successor: Chevron B26

Technical specifications
- Chassis: Aluminum-reinforced steel tubular space frame covered in fiberglass body panels
- Suspension (front): Double wishbones, coil springs over dampers, anti-roll bar
- Suspension (rear): Lower wishbones, top links, twin trail arms, coil springs over dampers, anti-roll bar
- Engine: Mid-engine, longitudinally mounted, 3.0 L (183 cu in), Ford-Cosworth DFV, V8, NA
- Transmission: Hewland FT-200 5-speed manual
- Power: 398 hp (297 kW).

Competition history

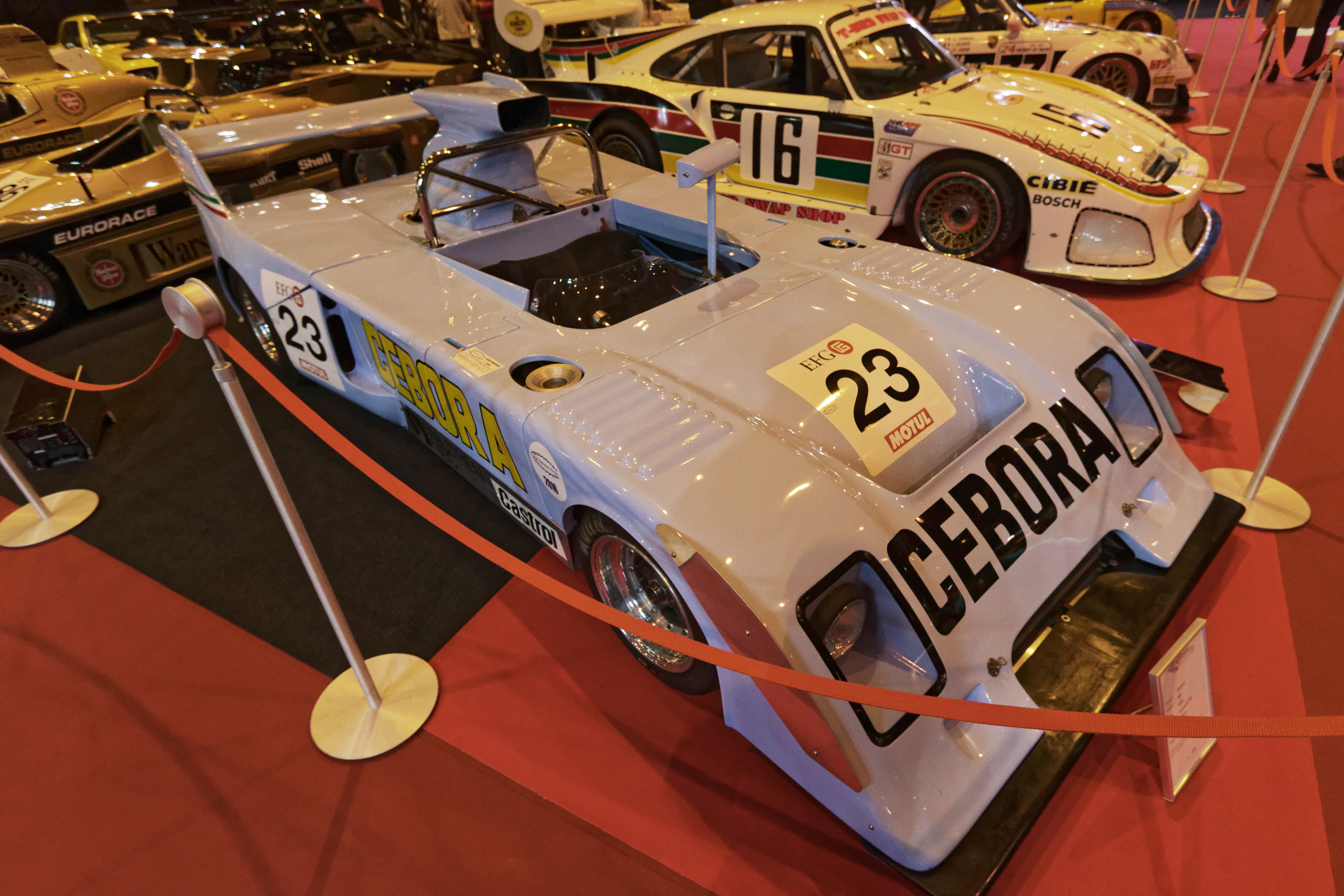
Chevron B23

The Chevron B23 is a Group 5 sports prototype race car, designed, developed and built by British manufacturer Chevron, in 1973. Over its racing career, spanning 12 years, it won a total of 12 races (plus 15 additional class wins), scored 41 podium finishes, and clinched 2 pole positions. It was powered by a naturally-aspirated 3.0 L (180 cu in) Ford-Cosworth DFV Formula One engine, producing 398 hp (297 kW).
