= 2011 British GT Championship =

Sports car racing season

Seasons
- ← 2010 2012 →

The 2011 Avon Tyres British GT season was the 19th season of the British GT Championship. The season began on 25 April at Oulton Park and finished on 8 October at Silverstone, after ten races at seven meetings.

On 22 November 2010, the SRO Motorsports Group announced changes to the structure of the 2011 season including a reduced calendar, however still with the inclusion of an overseas event. TV coverage continued to be broadcast on Channel 4 with the option to view again on 4oD and also on Motors TV.

== Rule changes ==
=== Class restructure and new homologations ===
For the 2011 season, the GT3 class was brought right up to date with the inclusion of new FIA homologated cars. This gave teams the options to run the new Ferrari 458 Italia or the Mercedes-Benz SLS AMG GT3 as well as the currently homologated cars. New to 2011 season was the introduction of the GT3B class catering for older, GT3 spec cars which do not conform to the latest FIA homologations. This should allow the running of cars such as the Dodge Viper Competition Coupe or Ferrari F430.

For the second year in a row, the GT4 class was a merger of Supersport-spec cars and GT4 homologated cars. Despite an unsuccessful return the previous year, the Cup class is to be continued. The cars eligible are the cars currently used in the Porsche Supercup and Ferrari Challenge series, based on the Porsche 997 and Ferrari F430 road cars. It is hoped that the Porsche Carrera Cup Great Britain's using updated cars will increase entries.

The ballast penalty system has been dropped in favour of a pit-stop time penalty formula where more successful driver pairings will be held during pit-stops for a longer time in order to level the competition. There are also plans for the development of a "Gentleman's Trophy", new logo and rebranding of the championship.

== Entry list ==
A list of expected entries was released on 8 March 2011 after the championship's Media Day at Silverstone.

2011 Entry List
Team	No.	Drivers	Class	Chassis	Engine	Rounds
(United Kingdom) Trackspeed	1	(United Kingdom) David Ashburn	GT3	Porsche 997 GT3-R	Porsche 4.0L	All
(United Kingdom) Trackspeed	1	(United Kingdom) Richard Westbrook	GT3	Porsche 997 GT3-R	Porsche 4.0L	1–2, 5–6, 10
(United Kingdom) Trackspeed	1	(United Kingdom) Phil Keen	GT3	Porsche 997 GT3-R	Porsche 4.0L	3, 7–8
(United Kingdom) Trackspeed	1	(United Kingdom) Stephen Jelley	GT3	Porsche 997 GT3-R	Porsche 4.0L	4, 9
(United Kingdom) Trackspeed	2	(United Kingdom) Gregor Fisken	GT3	Porsche 997 GT3-R	Porsche 4.0L	All
(United Kingdom) Trackspeed	2	(United Kingdom) Tim Bridgman	GT3	Porsche 997 GT3-R	Porsche 4.0L	All
(Denmark) Rosso Verde	3	(Denmark) Allan Simonsen	GT3	Ferrari 430 Scuderia GT3; Ferrari 458 Italia GT3	Ferrari 4.5L V8; Ferrari 4.5L V8	1–8
(Denmark) Rosso Verde	3	(United Kingdom) Hector Lester	GT3	Ferrari 430 Scuderia GT3; Ferrari 458 Italia GT3	Ferrari 4.5L V8; Ferrari 4.5L V8	All
(Denmark) Rosso Verde	3	(United Kingdom) Gordon Shedden	GT3	Ferrari 430 Scuderia GT3; Ferrari 458 Italia GT3	Ferrari 4.5L V8; Ferrari 4.5L V8	9–10
(United Kingdom) Chad Racing	4	(United Kingdom) Iain Dockerill	GT3	Ferrari 430 Scuderia GT3	Ferrari 4.5L V8	1–6
(United Kingdom) Chad Racing	4	(United Kingdom) Steven Kane	GT3	Ferrari 430 Scuderia GT3	Ferrari 4.5L V8	1–3
(United Kingdom) Chad Racing	4	(United Kingdom) Tom Ferrier	GT3	Ferrari 430 Scuderia GT3	Ferrari 4.5L V8	4–6
(United Kingdom) Scuderia Vittoria	5	(United Kingdom) Charles Bateman	GT3	Ferrari 458 Italia GT3	Ferrari 4.5L V8	All
(United Kingdom) Scuderia Vittoria	5	(United Kingdom) Michael Lyons	GT3	Ferrari 458 Italia GT3	Ferrari 4.5L V8	All
(United Kingdom) Scuderia Vittoria	50	(United Kingdom) Dan Denis	GT4	Ginetta G50 GT4	Ford Cyclone 3.5L V6	All
(United Kingdom) Scuderia Vittoria	50	(United Kingdom) David McDonald	GT4	Ginetta G50 GT4	Ford Cyclone 3.5L V6	All
(United Kingdom) Speedworks Motorsport	6	(United Kingdom) Piers Johnson	GT3	Corvette Z06.R GT3	Chevrolet LS7 7.0L V8	All
(United Kingdom) Speedworks Motorsport	6	(United Kingdom) Ron Johnson	GT3	Corvette Z06.R GT3	Chevrolet LS7 7.0L V8	All
(United Kingdom) Beechdean Motorsport	7	(United Kingdom) Jonathan Adam	GT3	Aston Martin DBRS9	Aston Martin 6.0L V12	All
(United Kingdom) Beechdean Motorsport	7	(United Kingdom) Andrew Howard	GT3	Aston Martin DBRS9	Aston Martin 6.0L V12	All
(United Kingdom) Vantage Racing	8	(United Kingdom) Tom Black	GT3	Aston Martin DBRS9	Aston Martin 6.0L V12	3–4
(United Kingdom) Vantage Racing	8	(United Kingdom) Stuart Hall	GT3	Aston Martin DBRS9	Aston Martin 6.0L V12	3
(United Kingdom) Vantage Racing	8	(United Kingdom) Alan Bonner	GT3	Aston Martin DBRS9	Aston Martin 6.0L V12	4
(United States) RPM	9	(United Kingdom) Peter Bamford	GT3	Ford GT GT3	Ford 5.0L V8	4, 10
(United States) RPM	9	(Germany) Thomas Mutsch	GT3	Ford GT GT3	Ford 5.0L V8	4
(United States) RPM	9	(United Kingdom) Bradley Ellis	GT3	Ford GT GT3	Ford 5.0L V8	10
(United Kingdom) CRS Racing	10	(United Kingdom) Glynn Geddie	GT3	Ferrari 458 Italia GT3; Ferrari 430 Scuderia GT3	Ferrari 4.5L V8; Ferrari 4.5L V8	All
(United Kingdom) CRS Racing	10	(United Kingdom) Jim Geddie	GT3	Ferrari 458 Italia GT3; Ferrari 430 Scuderia GT3	Ferrari 4.5L V8; Ferrari 4.5L V8	All
(United Kingdom) CRS Racing	11	(United Kingdom) Alex Mortimer	GT3	Ferrari 458 Italia GT3; Ferrari 430 Scuderia GT3	Ferrari 4.5L V8; Ferrari 4.5L V8	1–2, 4–10
(United Kingdom) CRS Racing	11	(United Kingdom) Andrew Tate	GT3	Ferrari 458 Italia GT3; Ferrari 430 Scuderia GT3	Ferrari 4.5L V8; Ferrari 4.5L V8	All
(United Kingdom) CRS Racing	11	(United Kingdom) Tim Mullen	GT3	Ferrari 458 Italia GT3; Ferrari 430 Scuderia GT3	Ferrari 4.5L V8; Ferrari 4.5L V8	3
(United Kingdom) Predator CCTV Racing	12	(United Kingdom) Adam Wilcox	GT3	Ferrari 430 Scuderia GT3	Ferrari 4.5L V8	All
(United Kingdom) Predator CCTV Racing	12	(United Kingdom) Phil Burton	GT3	Ferrari 430 Scuderia GT3	Ferrari 4.5L V8	All
(United Kingdom) MTECH Racing	13	(United Kingdom) Aaron Scott	GT3B	Ferrari F430 GT3	Ferrari 4.3L V8	All
(United Kingdom) MTECH Racing	13	(United Kingdom) John Dhillon	GT3B	Ferrari F430 GT3	Ferrari 4.3L V8	All
(United Kingdom) MTECH Racing	14	(United Kingdom) Paul Hogarth	GT3B	Ferrari F430 GT3	Ferrari 4.3L V8	4
(United Kingdom) MTECH Racing	14	(United Kingdom) James Pickford	GT3B	Ferrari F430 GT3	Ferrari 4.3L V8	4
(United Kingdom) MTECH Racing	20	(United Kingdom) Julien Draper	GT3	Ferrari 458 Italia GT3	Ferrari 4.5L V8	9–10
(United Kingdom) MTECH Racing	20	(United Kingdom) David Back	GT3	Ferrari 458 Italia GT3	Ferrari 4.5L V8	9
(United Kingdom) MTECH Racing	20	(United Kingdom) Matthew Draper	GT3	Ferrari 458 Italia GT3	Ferrari 4.5L V8	10
(United Kingdom) MTECH Racing	21	(United Kingdom) Duncan Cameron	GT3	Ferrari 458 Italia GT3	Ferrari 4.5L V8	All
(United Kingdom) MTECH Racing	21	(Republic of Ireland) Matt Griffin	GT3	Ferrari 458 Italia GT3	Ferrari 4.5L V8	All
(United Kingdom) Barwell Motorsport	15	(United Kingdom) Andy Ruhan	GT3B	Aston Martin DBRS9	Aston Martin 6.0L V12	10
(United Kingdom) Barwell Motorsport	15	(United Kingdom) Paul Whight	GT3B	Aston Martin DBRS9	Aston Martin 6.0L V12	10
(United Kingdom) Rollcentre Racing	18	(United Kingdom) Matt Nicoll-Jones	GT3	Ginetta G55 GT4	Ford Cyclone 3.7L V6	7–9
(United Kingdom) Rollcentre Racing	18	(United Kingdom) Martin Short	GT3	Ginetta G55 GT4	Ford Cyclone 3.7L V6	7–9
(United Kingdom) Rollcentre Racing	18	(United Kingdom) Tom Sharp	GT3	Ginetta G55 GT4	Ford Cyclone 3.7L V6	9–10
(United Kingdom) Rollcentre Racing	18	(United Kingdom) Andrew Jordan	GT3	Ginetta G55 GT4	Ford Cyclone 3.7L V6	10
(United Kingdom) Team Preci-Spark	22	(United Kingdom) David Jones	GT3	Mercedes-Benz SLS AMG GT3	Mercedes-AMG 6.2L V8	All
(United Kingdom) Team Preci-Spark	22	(United Kingdom) Godfrey Jones	GT3	Mercedes-Benz SLS AMG GT3	Mercedes-AMG 6.2L V8	All
(United States) United Autosports	23	(United States) Michael Guasch	GT3	Audi R8 LMS	Audi 5.2L V10	All
(United States) United Autosports	23	(United Kingdom) Matt Bell	GT3	Audi R8 LMS	Audi 5.2L V10	All
(United States) United Autosports	24	(United Kingdom) John Bintcliffe	GT3	Audi R8 LMS	Audi 5.2L V10	All
(United States) United Autosports	24	(United Kingdom) Jay Palmer	GT3	Audi R8 LMS	Audi 5.2L V10	All
(United States) United Autosports	29	(United States) Zak Brown	GT3	Audi R8 LMS	Audi 5.2L V10	10
(United States) United Autosports	29	(United Kingdom) Joe Osborne	GT3	Audi R8 LMS	Audi 5.2L V10	10
(United Kingdom) Stark Racing	25	(United Kingdom) Ian Stinton	GT3	Ginetta G55 GT4	Ford Cyclone 3.7L V6	All
(United Kingdom) Stark Racing	25	(United Kingdom) Mike Simpson	GT3	Ginetta G55 GT4	Ford Cyclone 3.7L V6	1–8, 10
(United Kingdom) Stark Racing	25	(United Kingdom) Stefan Hodgetts	GT3	Ginetta G55 GT4	Ford Cyclone 3.7L V6	9
(United Kingdom) JHR Developments	26	(United Kingdom) Stefan Hodgetts	GT3	Ginetta G55 GT4	Ford Cyclone 3.7L V6	1–2
(United Kingdom) JHR Developments	26	(United Kingdom) Adam Morgan	GT3	Ginetta G55 GT4	Ford Cyclone 3.7L V6	1–2
(United Kingdom) ThePlayer.co.uk LNT (United Kingdom) Century Motorsport	27	(United Kingdom) Andrew Jordan	GT3	Ginetta G55 GT4	Ford Cyclone 3.7L V6	1–2
(United Kingdom) ThePlayer.co.uk LNT (United Kingdom) Century Motorsport	27	(United Kingdom) Colin White	GT3	Ginetta G55 GT4	Ford Cyclone 3.7L V6	1–2
(United Kingdom) ThePlayer.co.uk LNT (United Kingdom) Century Motorsport	27	(Austria) Florian Renauer	GT3	Ginetta G55 GT4	Ford Cyclone 3.7L V6	3
(United Kingdom) ThePlayer.co.uk LNT (United Kingdom) Century Motorsport	27	(Austria) Michael Drabing	GT3	Ginetta G55 GT4	Ford Cyclone 3.7L V6	3
(United Kingdom) ThePlayer.co.uk LNT (United Kingdom) Century Motorsport	28	(United Kingdom) Freddie Hetherington	GT3	Ginetta G55 GT4	Ford Cyclone 3.7L V6	1–6, 9
(United Kingdom) ThePlayer.co.uk LNT (United Kingdom) Century Motorsport	28	(United Kingdom) Julien Draper	GT3	Ginetta G55 GT4	Ford Cyclone 3.7L V6	1–6
(United Kingdom) ThePlayer.co.uk LNT (United Kingdom) Century Motorsport	28	(United Kingdom) Jody Firth	GT3	Ginetta G55 GT4	Ford Cyclone 3.7L V6	7–8
(United Kingdom) ThePlayer.co.uk LNT (United Kingdom) Century Motorsport	28	(United Kingdom) Stefan Hodgetts	GT3	Ginetta G55 GT4	Ford Cyclone 3.7L V6	7–8, 10
(United Kingdom) ThePlayer.co.uk LNT (United Kingdom) Century Motorsport	28	(United Kingdom) Benji Hetherington	GT3	Ginetta G55 GT4	Ford Cyclone 3.7L V6	9
(United Kingdom) ThePlayer.co.uk LNT (United Kingdom) Century Motorsport	28	(United Kingdom) Steve Quick	GT3	Ginetta G55 GT4	Ford Cyclone 3.7L V6	10
(United Kingdom) ThePlayer.co.uk LNT (United Kingdom) Century Motorsport	42	(United Kingdom) Josh Wakefield	GT4	Ginetta G50 GT4	Ford Cyclone 3.5L V6	All
(United Kingdom) ThePlayer.co.uk LNT (United Kingdom) Century Motorsport	42	(United Kingdom) Jake Rattenbury	GT4	Ginetta G50 GT4	Ford Cyclone 3.5L V6	All
(United Kingdom) 22GT Racing	32	(United Kingdom) Tom Alexander	GT3B	Aston Martin DBRS9	Aston Martin 6.0L V12	4
(United Kingdom) 22GT Racing	32	(United Kingdom) Adrian Willmott	GT3B	Aston Martin DBRS9	Aston Martin 6.0L V12	4
(United Kingdom) Backdraft Motorsport	33	(United Kingdom) Simon Atkinson	GT3B	Lamborghini Gallardo LP560 GT3	Lamborghini 5.2L V10	10
(United Kingdom) Backdraft Motorsport	33	(United Kingdom) James Pickford	GT3B	Lamborghini Gallardo LP560 GT3	Lamborghini 5.2L V10	10
Aston Martin Belgium	43	(Belgium) Arnold Herreman	GT4	Aston Martin V8 Vantage GT4	Aston Martin 4.7L V8	4
Aston Martin Belgium	43	(Belgium) Jean-Paul Herreman	GT4	Aston Martin V8 Vantage GT4	Aston Martin 4.7L V8	4
(United Kingdom) ABG Motorsport	44	(United Kingdom) Marcus Clutton	GT4	KTM X-Bow GT4	Volkswagen 2.0L Turbo I4	All
(United Kingdom) ABG Motorsport	44	(United Kingdom) Peter Belshaw	GT4	KTM X-Bow GT4	Volkswagen 2.0L Turbo I4	All
(United Kingdom) ABG Motorsport	45	(United Kingdom) Michael Mallock	GT4	KTM X-Bow GT4	Volkswagen 2.0L Turbo I4	1–6
(United Kingdom) ABG Motorsport	45	(Greece) Athanasios Ladas	GT4	KTM X-Bow GT4	Volkswagen 2.0L Turbo I4	1–6
(United Kingdom) Secure Racing	47	(United Kingdom) Peter Erceg	GT4	Aston Martin V8 Vantage GT4	Aston Martin 4.7L V8	4–6, 9–10
(United Kingdom) Secure Racing	47	(United Kingdom) Chris Holmes	GT4	Aston Martin V8 Vantage GT4	Aston Martin 4.7L V8	4–6
(United Kingdom) Secure Racing	47	(Brazil) Alan Hellmeister	GT4	Aston Martin V8 Vantage GT4	Aston Martin 4.7L V8	9
(United Kingdom) Secure Racing	47	(Brazil) Sergio Lagana	GT4	Aston Martin V8 Vantage GT4	Aston Martin 4.7L V8	9
(United Kingdom) Secure Racing	47	(United Kingdom) Tiff Needell	GT4	Aston Martin V8 Vantage GT4	Aston Martin 4.7L V8	10
(United Kingdom) CM Consolidated; Lotus Sport UK	48	(United Kingdom) Ollie Jackson	GT4	Lotus Evora GT4	Toyota 2GR-FE 4.0L V6	1–8
(United Kingdom) CM Consolidated; Lotus Sport UK	48	(United Kingdom) Jack Drinkall	GT4	Lotus Evora GT4	Toyota 2GR-FE 4.0L V6	1–3
(United Kingdom) CM Consolidated; Lotus Sport UK	48	(United Kingdom) Phil Glew	GT4	Lotus Evora GT4	Toyota 2GR-FE 4.0L V6	4–10
(United Kingdom) CM Consolidated; Lotus Sport UK	48	(United Kingdom) James Nash	GT4	Lotus Evora GT4	Toyota 2GR-FE 4.0L V6	9
(United Kingdom) CM Consolidated; Lotus Sport UK	48	(United Kingdom) Chris Holmes	GT4	Lotus Evora GT4	Toyota 2GR-FE 4.0L V6	10
(United Kingdom) CM Consolidated; Lotus Sport UK	49	(United Kingdom) Leyton Clarke	GT4	Lotus Evora GT4	Toyota 2GR-FE 4.0L V6	All
(United Kingdom) CM Consolidated; Lotus Sport UK	49	(Sweden) Freddy Nordström	GT4	Lotus Evora GT4	Toyota 2GR-FE 4.0L V6	All
(United Kingdom) Magic Racing	51	(United Kingdom) Stewart Linn	GT4	Ginetta G50 GT4	Ford Cyclone 3.5L V6	10
(United Kingdom) Magic Racing	51	(Sweden) Chris Midmark	GT4	Ginetta G50 GT4	Ford Cyclone 3.5L V6	10
(United Kingdom) Magic Racing	63	(Sweden) Bjorn Gustavson	GTC	Ginetta G50 GT4	Ford Cyclone 3.5L V6	4
(United Kingdom) Magic Racing	63	(Sweden) Anders Gustavson	GTC	Ginetta G50 GT4	Ford Cyclone 3.5L V6	4
(United Kingdom) McLaren GT	59	(United Kingdom) Chris Goodwin	Inv	McLaren MP4-12C GT3	McLaren M838T 3.8L Turbo V8	5–6
(United Kingdom) McLaren GT	59	(United Kingdom) Andrew Kirkaldy	Inv	McLaren MP4-12C GT3	McLaren M838T 3.8L Turbo V8	5–6
(United Kingdom) JRM	90	(United Kingdom) Alex Buncombe	Inv	Nissan GT-R GT3	Nissan VR38DETT 3.8L Turbo V6	9
(United Kingdom) JRM	90	(Netherlands) Nick Catsburg	Inv	Nissan GT-R GT3	Nissan VR38DETT 3.8L Turbo V6	9
(United Kingdom) Chevron Racing Cars	96	(United Kingdom) Ray Grimes	GTC	Chevron GR8 GT4	Ford Cosworth YD 2.0L Turbo I4	10
(United Kingdom) Chevron Racing Cars	96	(United Kingdom) David Witt	GTC	Chevron GR8 GT4	Ford Cosworth YD 2.0L Turbo I4	10
(United Kingdom) Chevron Racing Cars	97	(United Kingdom) Anthony Reid	GTC	Chevron GR8 GT4	Ford Cosworth YD 2.0L Turbo I4	1–4, 9–10
(United Kingdom) Chevron Racing Cars	97	(United Kingdom) Jordan Witt	GTC	Chevron GR8 GT4	Ford Cosworth YD 2.0L Turbo I4	1–4, 9–10

Icon	Class
GT3	GT3 Class
GT3B	GT3B Class
GT4	GT4 Class
GTC	Cup Class
Inv	Invitation Class

== Calendar ==
A provisional 12-race calendar was announced on 22 November 2010. This was then refined on 16 February 2011. All races except Belgian round at Spa, were held in the United Kingdom.

Round	Circuit	Date	Length	Pole position	GT3 winner	GT4 winner
1	Oulton Park	25 April	60 mins	No. 5 Scuderia Vittoria	No. 1 Trackspeed	No. 44 ABG Motorsport
1	Oulton Park	25 April	60 mins	(United Kingdom) Charles Bateman (United Kingdom) Michael Lyons	(United Kingdom) David Ashburn (United Kingdom) Richard Westbrook	(United Kingdom) Peter Belshaw (United Kingdom) Marcus Clutton
2	Oulton Park	25 April	60 mins	No. 1 Trackspeed	No. 5 Scuderia Vittoria	No. 42 Century Motorsport
2	Oulton Park	25 April	60 mins	(United Kingdom) David Ashburn (United Kingdom) Richard Westbrook	(United Kingdom) Charles Bateman (United Kingdom) Michael Lyons	(United Kingdom) Jake Rattenbury (United Kingdom) Josh Wakefield
3	Snetterton 300	15 May	120 mins	No. 10 CRS Racing	No. 23 United Autosports	No. 44 ABG Motorsport
3	Snetterton 300	15 May	120 mins	(United Kingdom) Glynn Geddie (United Kingdom) Jim Geddie	(United Kingdom) Matt Bell (United States) Michael Guasch	(United Kingdom) Peter Belshaw (United Kingdom) Marcus Clutton
4	Brands Hatch	19 June	120 mins	No. 21 MTech	No. 2 Trackspeed	No. 44 ABG Motorsport
4	Brands Hatch	19 June	120 mins	(United Kingdom) Duncan Cameron (Republic of Ireland) Matt Griffin	(United Kingdom) Tim Bridgman (United Kingdom) Gregor Fisken	(United Kingdom) Peter Belshaw (United Kingdom) Marcus Clutton
5	Spa-Francorchamps	9 July	60 mins	No. 59 McLaren GT	No. 1 Trackspeed	No. 50 Scuderia Vittoria
5	Spa-Francorchamps	9 July	60 mins	(United Kingdom) Chris Goodwin (United Kingdom) Andrew Kirkaldy	(United Kingdom) David Ashburn (United Kingdom) Richard Westbrook	(United Kingdom) Dan Denis (United Kingdom) David McDonald
6	Spa-Francorchamps	9 July	60 mins	No. 1 Trackspeed	No. 21 MTech	No. 48 Lotus Sport UK
6	Spa-Francorchamps	9 July	60 mins	(United Kingdom) David Ashburn (United Kingdom) Richard Westbrook	(United Kingdom) Duncan Cameron (Republic of Ireland) Matt Griffin	(United Kingdom) Phil Glew (United Kingdom) Ollie Jackson
7	Rockingham	4 September	60 mins	No. 23 United Autosports	No. 7 Beechdean Motorsport	No. 50 Scuderia Vittoria
7	Rockingham	4 September	60 mins	(United Kingdom) Matt Bell (United States) Michael Guasch	(United Kingdom) Jonathan Adam (United Kingdom) Andrew Howard	(United Kingdom) Dan Denis (United Kingdom) David McDonald
8	Rockingham	4 September	60 mins	No. 2 Trackspeed	No. 11 CRS Racing	No. 50 Scuderia Vittoria
8	Rockingham	4 September	60 mins	(United Kingdom) Tim Bridgman (United Kingdom) Gregor Fisken	(United Kingdom) Alex Mortimer (United Kingdom) Andrew Tate	(United Kingdom) Dan Denis (United Kingdom) David McDonald
9	Donington Park	25 September	180 mins	No. 1 Trackspeed	No. 5 Scuderia Vittoria	No. 48 Lotus Sport UK
9	Donington Park	25 September	180 mins	(United Kingdom) David Ashburn (United Kingdom) Stephen Jelley	(United Kingdom) Charles Bateman (United Kingdom) Michael Lyons	(United Kingdom) Phil Glew (United Kingdom) James Nash
10	Silverstone Arena	8 October	120 mins	No. 7 Beechdean Motorsport	No. 7 Beechdean Motorsport	No. 48 Lotus Sport UK
10	Silverstone Arena	8 October	120 mins	(United Kingdom) Jonathan Adam (United Kingdom) Andrew Howard	(United Kingdom) Jonathan Adam (United Kingdom) Andrew Howard	(United Kingdom) Phil Glew (United Kingdom) Chris Holmes

== Championship standings ==
- Points were awarded as follows:

Length	1	2	3	4	5	6	7	8	9	10
60 mins	25	18	15	12	10	8	6	4	2	1
60+ mins	37.5	27	22.5	18	15	12	9	6	3	1.5
Half points were awarded if a class had less than 3 cars

=== GT3/GT3B/GTC ===
Pos	Driver	OUL		SNE	BRH	SPA		ROC		DON	SIL	Pts
GT3 Class
1	(United Kingdom) Glynn Geddie	8	5	2	3	3	6	12	2	5	3	144
1	(United Kingdom) Jim Geddie	8	5	2	3	3	6	12	2	5	3	144
2	(United Kingdom) David Ashburn	1	4	Ret	Ret	1	Ret	3	6	4	2	130
3	(United Kingdom) Charles Bateman	6	1	18†	5	19	9	7	4	1	7	116.5
3	(United Kingdom) Michael Lyons	6	1	18†	5	19	9	7	4	1	7	116.5
4	(United Kingdom) Duncan Cameron	7	Ret	16†	2	2	1	11	3	3	9	116.5
4	(Republic of Ireland) Matt Griffin	7	Ret	16†	2	2	1	11	3	3	9	116.5
5	(United Kingdom) Jonathan Adam	3	DNS	7	20	5	3	1	9	Ret	1	113.5
5	(United Kingdom) Andrew Howard	3	DNS	7	20	5	3	1	9	Ret	1	113.5
6	(United Kingdom) Matt Bell	2	3	1	Ret	6	5	10	5	7	22	110.5
6	(United States) Michael Guasch	2	3	1	Ret	6	5	10	5	7	22	110.5
7	(United Kingdom) Tim Bridgman	23†	10	Ret	1	7	2	DNS	DNS	2	4	107.5
7	(United Kingdom) Gregor Fisken	23†	10	Ret	1	7	2	DNS	DNS	2	4	107.5
8	(United Kingdom) David Jones	5	2	4	6	10	Ret	2	7	DNS	5	98
8	(United Kingdom) Godfrey Jones	5	2	4	6	10	Ret	2	7	DNS	5	98
9	(United Kingdom) Richard Westbrook	1	4			1	Ret				2	89
10	(United Kingdom) Hector Lester	4	7	3	4	11	8	6	8	6	11	88.5
11	(Denmark) Allan Simonsen	4	7	3	4	11	8	6	8			76.5
12	(United Kingdom) Andrew Tate	Ret	6	Ret	7	4	Ret	15	1	Ret	10	55.5
12	(United Kingdom) Alex Mortimer	Ret	6		7	4	Ret	15	1	Ret	10	55.5
13	(United Kingdom) Phil Burton	10	8	13†	9	8	Ret	8	15	8	DNS	23.5
13	(United Kingdom) Adam Wilcox	10	8	13†	9	8	Ret	8	15	8	DNS	23.5
14	(United Kingdom) Phil Keen			Ret				3	6			23
15	(United Kingdom) John Bintcliffe	Ret	11	5	8	Ret	10	14	DSQ	DNS	14	23
15	(United Kingdom) Jay Palmer	Ret	11	5	8	Ret	10	14	DSQ	DNS	14	23
16	(United Kingdom) Stephen Jelley				Ret					4		18
17	(United Kingdom) John Dhillon	15	17	8	13	DNS	12	5	10	11	Ret	18
17	(United Kingdom) Aaron Scott	15	17	8	13	DNS	12	5	10	11	Ret	18
18	(United Kingdom) Iain Dockerill	9	Ret	6	Ret	DNS	DNS					14
18	(United Kingdom) Steven Kane	9	Ret	6								14
19	(United Kingdom) Piers Johnson	11	19†	DNS	Ret	9	7	Ret	DNS	9	13	13
19	(United Kingdom) Ron Johnson	11	19†	DNS	Ret	9	7	Ret	DNS	9	13	13
20	(United Kingdom) Stefan Hodgetts	14	Ret					4	Ret	Ret	27†	12
20	(United Kingdom) Jody Firth							4	Ret			12
21	(United Kingdom) Gordon Shedden									6	11	12
22	(United States) Zak Brown										6	12
22	(United Kingdom) Joe Osborne										6	12
23	(United Kingdom) Julien Draper	13	9	15	16	Ret	DNS			17	8	8
24	(United Kingdom) Matthew Draper										8	6
25	(United Kingdom) Mike Simpson	22	16	Ret	10	Ret	DNS	9	Ret		17	3.5
25	(United Kingdom) Ian Stinton	22	16	Ret	10	Ret	DNS	9	Ret	Ret	17	3.5
26	(Austria) Florian Renauer			12								3
26	(Austria) Michael Drabing			12								3
27	(United Kingdom) Freddie Hetherington	13	9	15	16	Ret	DNS			DNS		2
28	(United Kingdom) Matt Nicoll-Jones							DNS	DNS	10		1.5
28	(United Kingdom) Martin Short							DNS	DNS	10		1.5
28	(United Kingdom) Tom Sharp									10	Ret	1.5
29	(United Kingdom) Peter Bamford				Ret						12	0
29	(United Kingdom) Bradley Ellis										12	0
30	(United Kingdom) Adam Morgan	14	Ret									0
31	(United Kingdom) Andrew Jordan	17	Ret								Ret	0
31	(United Kingdom) Colin White	17	Ret									0
32	(United Kingdom) Tom Black			17†	Ret							0
33	(United Kingdom) Stuart Hall			17†								0
34	(United Kingdom) David Back									17		0
35	(United Kingdom) Tom Alexander				19							0
35	(United Kingdom) Adrian Willmott				19							0
36	(United Kingdom) Simon Atkinson										26	0
36	(United Kingdom) James Pickford				NC						26	0
37	(United Kingdom) Steve Quick										27†	0
	(United Kingdom) Paul Hogarth				NC							0
	(United Kingdom) Tom Ferrier				Ret	DNS	DNS					0
	(United Kingdom) Tim Mullen			Ret								0
	(Germany) Thomas Mutsch				Ret							0
	(United Kingdom) Alan Bonner				Ret							0
	(United Kingdom) Andy Ruhan										Ret	0
	(United Kingdom) Paul Whight										Ret	0
	(United Kingdom) Benji Hetherington									DNS		0
Guest drivers ineligible for points
	(United Kingdom) Chris Goodwin					12	4					0
	(United Kingdom) Andrew Kirkaldy					12	4					0
	(United Kingdom) Alex Buncombe									20†		0
	(Netherlands) Nick Catsburg									20†		0
GT3B Class
1	(United Kingdom) John Dhillon	15	17	8	13	DNS	13	5	10	11	Ret	137.5
1	(United Kingdom) Aaron Scott	15	17	8	13	DNS	13	5	10	11	Ret	137.5
2	(United Kingdom) Simon Atkinson										26	37.5
2	(United Kingdom) James Pickford				NC						26	37.5
3	(United Kingdom) Tom Alexander				19							27
3	(United Kingdom) Adrian Willmott				19							27
	(United Kingdom) Paul Hogarth				NC							0
	(United Kingdom) Andy Ruhan										Ret	0
	(United Kingdom) Paul Whight										Ret	0
GTC Class
1	(United Kingdom) Anthony Reid	12	12	19	12					12	15	100
1	(United Kingdom) Jordan Witt	12	12	19	12					12	15	100
2	(United Kingdom) Ray Grimes										21	13.5
2	(United Kingdom) David Witt										21	13.5
3	(Sweden) Anders Gustavson				23							13.5
3	(Sweden) Bjorn Gustavson				23							13.5
Pos	Driver	OUL		SNE	BRH	SPA		ROC		DON	SIL	Pts

Colour	Result
Gold	Winner
Silver	Second place
Bronze	Third place
Green	Points classification
Blue	Non-points classification
Blue	Non-classified finish (NC)
Purple	Retired, not classified (Ret)
Red	Did not qualify (DNQ)
Red	Did not pre-qualify (DNPQ)
Black	Disqualified (DSQ)
White	Did not start (DNS)
White	Withdrew (WD)
White	Race cancelled (C)
Blank	Did not practice (DNP)
Blank	Did not arrive (DNA)
Blank	Excluded (EX)

† — Drivers did not finish the race, but were classified as they completed over 90% of the race distance.

=== GT4 ===
Pos	Driver	OUL		SNE	BRH	SPA		ROC		DON	SIL	Pts
1	(United Kingdom) Peter Belshaw	16	Ret	9	11	17	12	19	12	15	18	205.5
1	(United Kingdom) Marcus Clutton	16	Ret	9	11	17	12	19	12	15	18	205.5
2	(United Kingdom) Dan Denis	18	Ret	Ret	15	13	20	13	11	16	19	164
2	(United Kingdom) David McDonald	18	Ret	Ret	15	13	20	13	11	16	19	164
3	(United Kingdom) Leyton Clarke	21	14	10	14	15	16	16	14	18†	24†	164
3	(Sweden) Freddy Nordström	21	14	10	14	15	16	16	14	18†	24†	164
4	(United Kingdom) Jake Rattenbury	20	13	Ret	17	14	14	18	13	14	20	157
4	(United Kingdom) Josh Wakefield	20	13	Ret	17	14	14	18	13	14	20	157
5	(United Kingdom) Phil Glew				21†	16	10	17	Ret	13	16	139
6	(United Kingdom) Ollie Jackson	Ret	15	11	21†	16	10	17	Ret			101.5
7	(United Kingdom) Chris Holmes				18	18	13				16	75.5
8	(United Kingdom) Peter Erceg				18	18	13			19	25	59
9	(Greece) Athanasios Ladas	19	18	14	24†	DNS	DNS					51
9	(United Kingdom) Michael Mallock	19	18	14	24†	DNS	DNS					51
10	(United Kingdom) James Nash									13		37.5
11	(United Kingdom) Jack Drinkall	Ret	15	11								37.5
12	(United Kingdom) Stewart Linn										23	15
12	(Sweden) Chris Midmark										23	15
13	(Brazil) Alan Hellmeister									19		12
13	(Brazil) Sergio Lagana									19		12
14	(Belgium) Arnold Herreman				22							9
14	(Belgium) Jean-Paul Herreman				22							9
15	(United Kingdom) Tiff Needell										25	9
Pos	Driver	OUL		SNE	BRH	SPA		ROC		DON	SIL	Pts

Colour	Result
Gold	Winner
Silver	Second place
Bronze	Third place
Green	Points classification
Blue	Non-points classification
Blue	Non-classified finish (NC)
Purple	Retired, not classified (Ret)
Red	Did not qualify (DNQ)
Red	Did not pre-qualify (DNPQ)
Black	Disqualified (DSQ)
White	Did not start (DNS)
White	Withdrew (WD)
White	Race cancelled (C)
Blank	Did not practice (DNP)
Blank	Did not arrive (DNA)
Blank	Excluded (EX)
