= Chevron B12 =

Sports racing car

- Category: Group 4
- Constructor: Chevron
- Designer: Derek Bennett
- Production: 1968–1972

Technical specifications
- Chassis: Steel-reinforced tubular space frame covered in fiberglass body panels
- Suspension (front): Double wishbones, coil springs over dampers, anti-roll bar
- Suspension (rear): Lower wishbones, top links, twin trail arms, coil springs over dampers, anti-roll bar
- Engine: Mid-engine, longitudinally mounted, 3.0 L (183 cu in), 90°, DOHC, Repco 620 V8, NA
- Transmission: 5-speed manual
- Weight: 550 kg (1,210 lb)

Competition history

The Chevron B12 is a lightweight sports racing car, designed, developed and built by British manufacturer Chevron Cars, in 1968, and was essentially a modified (lengthened) version of their B8 model.
