= Chevron B2 =

Open-wheel sports car

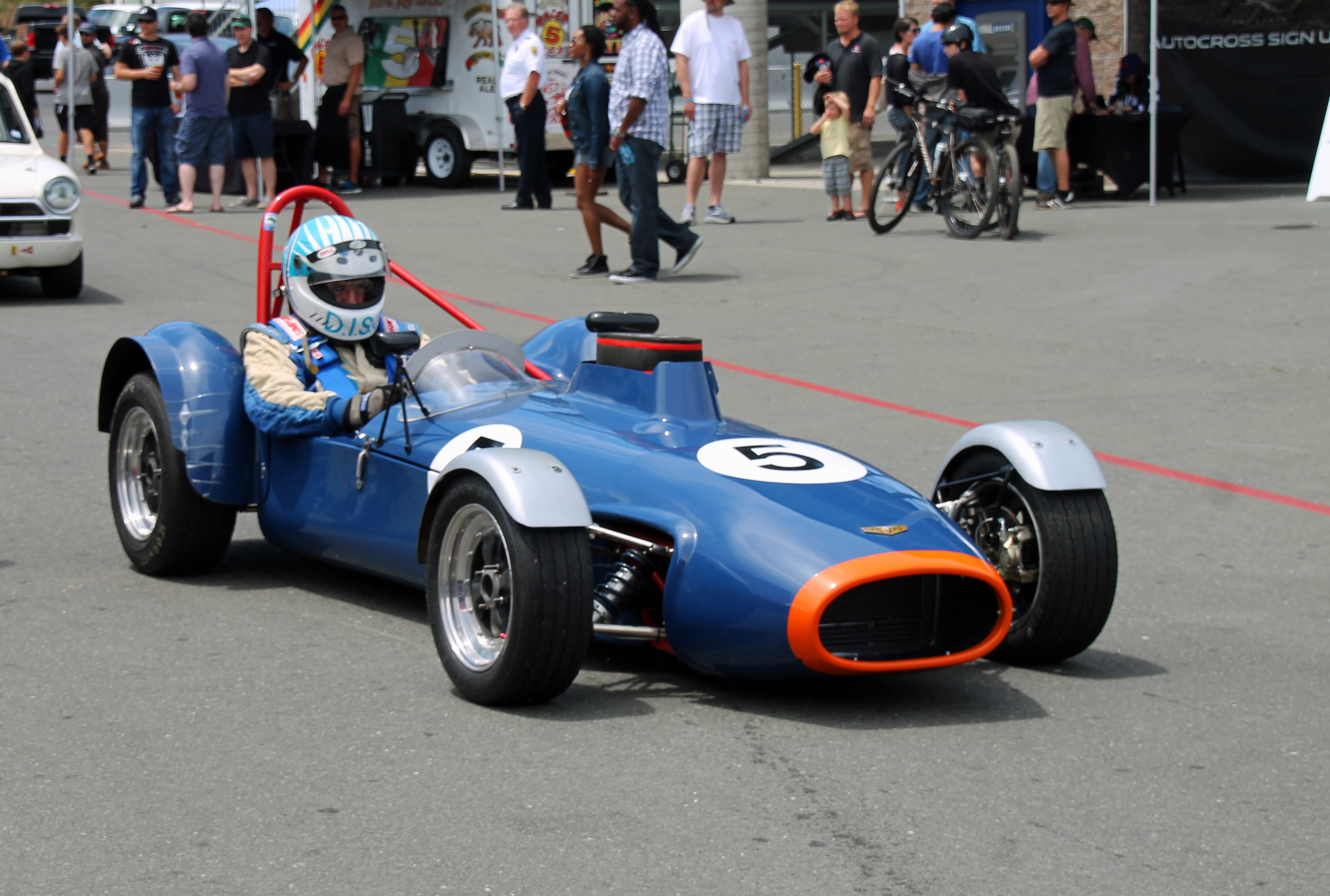
Chevron B2

The Chevron B2 was the second car to be developed and built by British manufacturer Chevron, in 1966. Designed by Derek Bennett, it was lightweight open-wheel sports car, specifically intended and purpose-built to compete in the clubman class series of racing; a series for front-engined sports prototype cars. Like its predecessor, it was constructed out of a steel tubular spaceframe chassis, covered in aluminum body panels. This meant it was very light, weighing only 400 kg (880 lb). It was powered by a naturally-aspirated 1,498 cc (91.4 cu in) Ford-Cosworth. Only four cars were produced. Over its racing career, spanning two years (1966, 1971), it won a single race (plus 2 additional class wins), at Oulton Park in 1966, and also scored 8 podium finishes, and clinched 1 pole position.
