= Chevron B16 =

Prototype race car

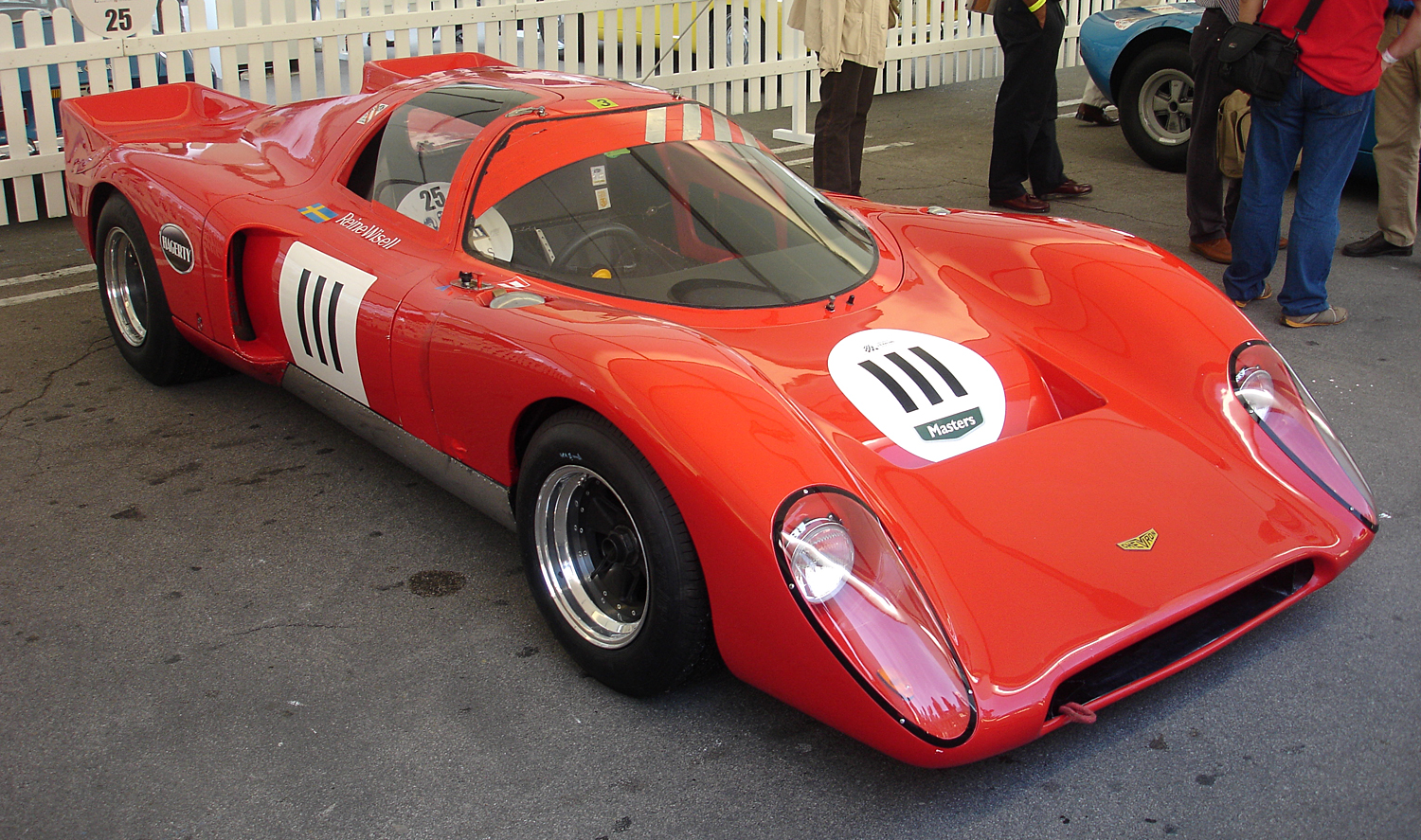
Chevron B16-001

The Chevron B16 was a Group 4 sports prototype race car, designed, developed, and built in 1969 by the British racing car manufacturer Chevron Cars as a two-seater racing sports car for the makes world championship. Brian Redman won the very first outing, the 500 km (310 mi) race at the Nürburgring on September 7, 1969, at a time of 3:13:01.6 hours. The last victory with a Chevron B16 was achieved by Clemens Schickentanz on July 11, 1971, in the sports car race at the Norisring.

== Design and versions ==
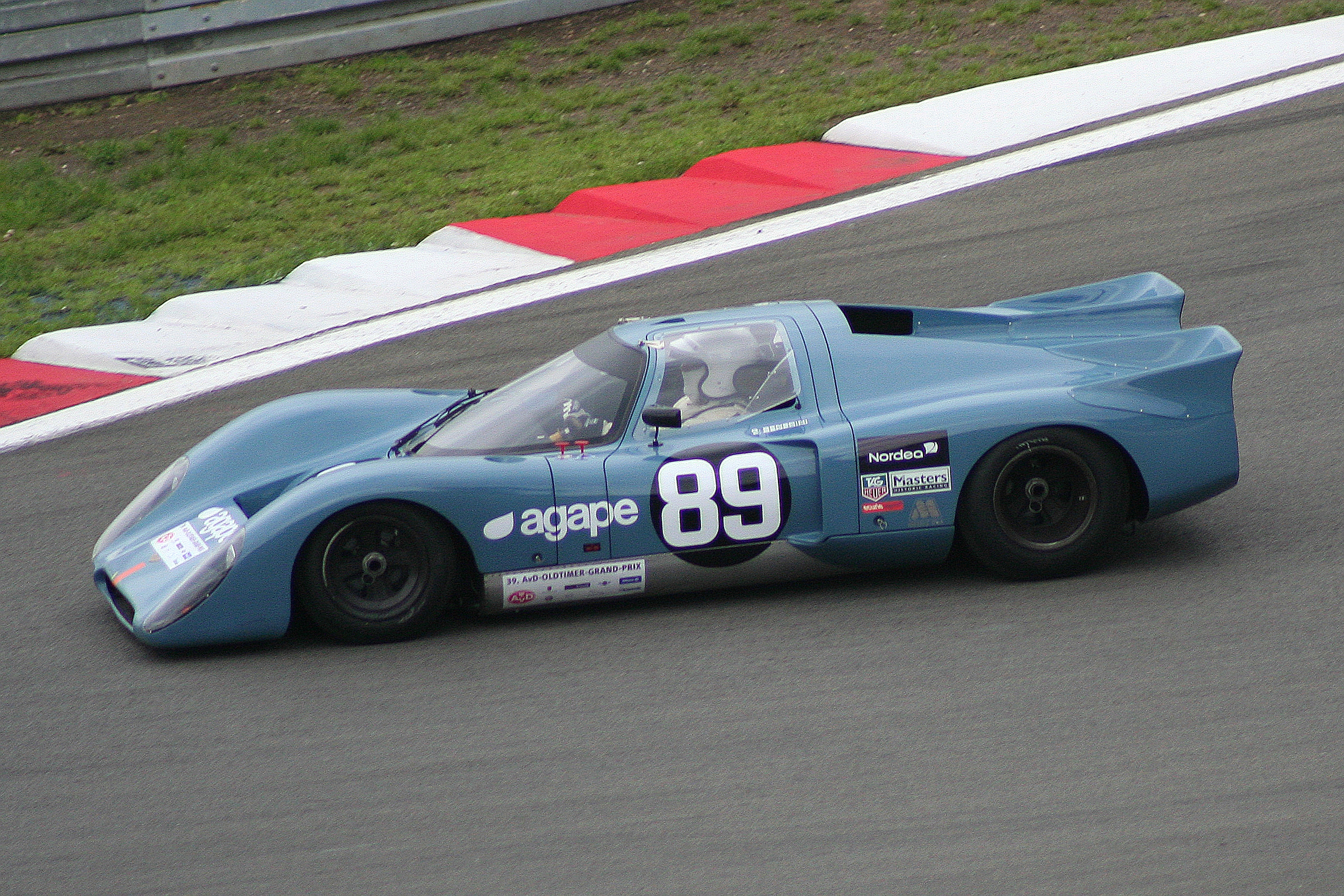
1969 Chevron B16

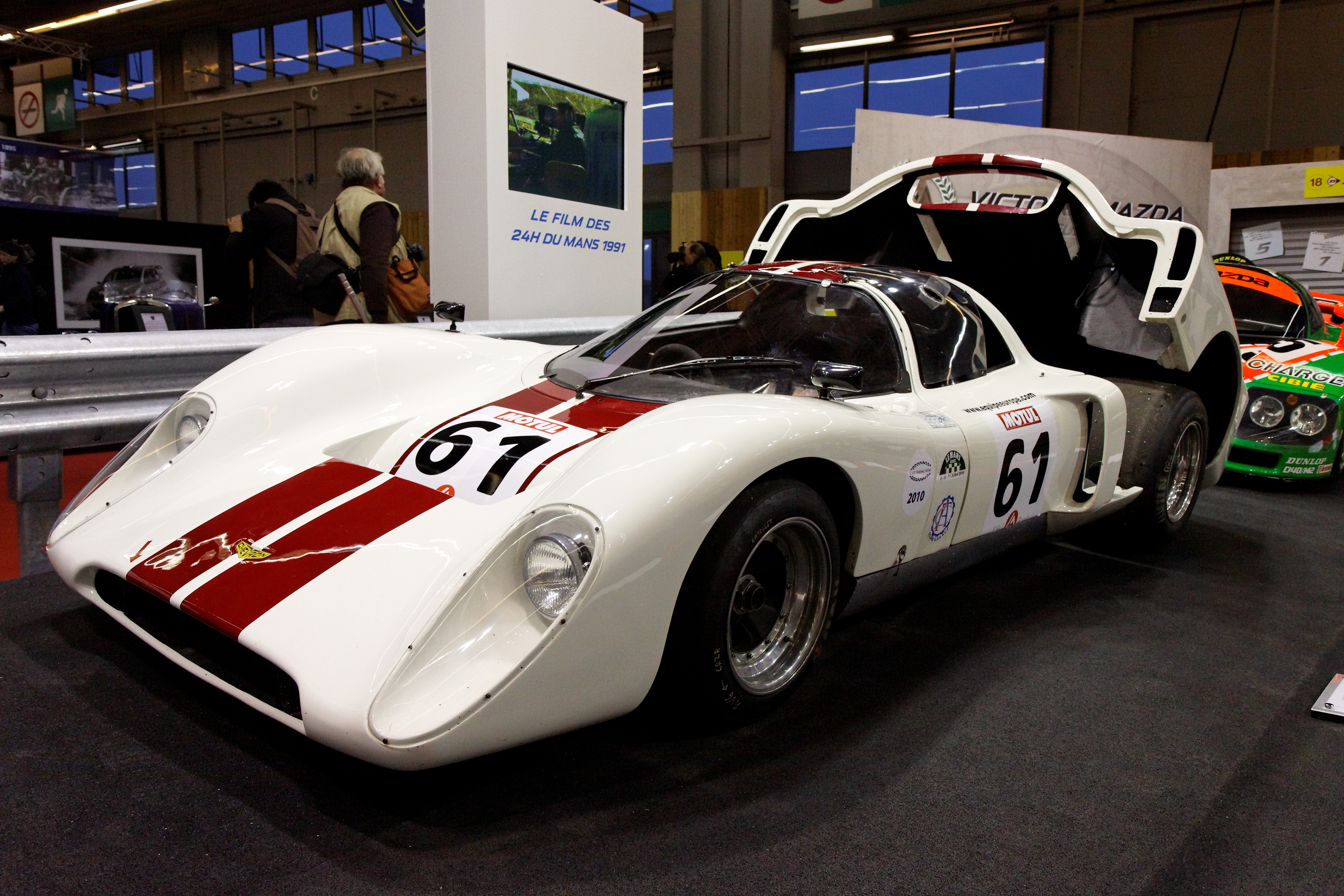
Chevron B16-Mazda

As with the previous B8, Derek Bennett (1933–1978) used a lattice tube construction with stiffening sheets of steel and aluminum for the chassis. The chassis with double wishbones on all wheels corresponded to the usual. Derek Bennett also designed the fiberglass body, which was manufactured by Specialized Moldings. The first cars were powered by a 1.6 liter Ford Cosworth FVA engine from Formula 2. Thanks to personal contact between Bennett and Keith Duckworth, the Cosworth engine was revised with a displacement of 1,598 cc (97.5 cu in). A displacement increased to 1790 cc resulted in a higher performance of 235 bhp (175 kW) at 8750 min -1 in this engine. 18 copies of this engine were delivered to Chevron, later a BMW M-10 engine with 2 liters capacity and a Mazda Wankel engine were also used. A total of 23 Chevron B16s were built, which is considered one of the most beautiful Chevron sports cars. In 2013, a Chevron B16 sold for just under £270,000 at an auction in London. Kit car replicas of the Chevron B16 were offered in the 1990s.

== B16 Spyder ==
As a one-off, the single-seater and open Chevron B16 Spyder with a 1790 cc Cosworth engine was also successfully used by Brian Redman in the 2-liter class of the European Sports Car Championship in 1970.

== 500 km race at the Nürburgring ==
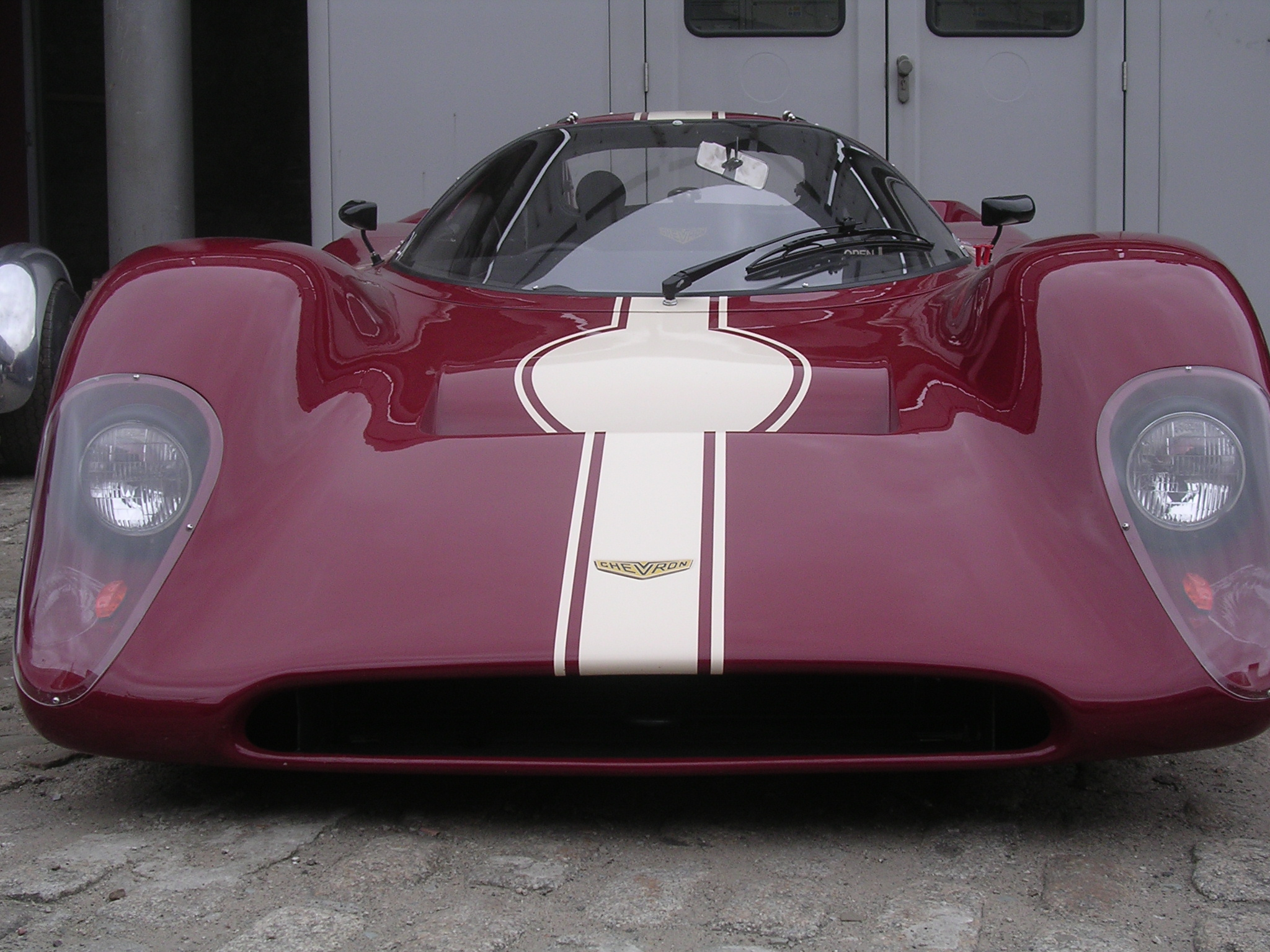
B16 front

The favorites for the 1969 500 km (310 mi) race at the Nürburgring were three Abarths, a prototype, and two sports cars, with drivers Johannes Ortner, Toine Hezemans, and Gijs van Lennep, who were already setting such good times on Friday that they skipped Saturday practice. But on Saturday, Brian Redman in the new 1.6-liter Chevron B16 set a lap of 8:33.5, 5.6 seconds faster than Hezeman's two-liter Abarth. In the race, Redman led from start to finish and set the fastest lap of 8:40.4 minutes. Places two to five were taken by the Abarth drivers Hezemans, van Lennep and Ortner and Herbert Schultzeon Alfa Romeo Tipo 33. In contrast to long-distance races, the drivers completed the 500 kilometers without being relieved.

== Specifications ==
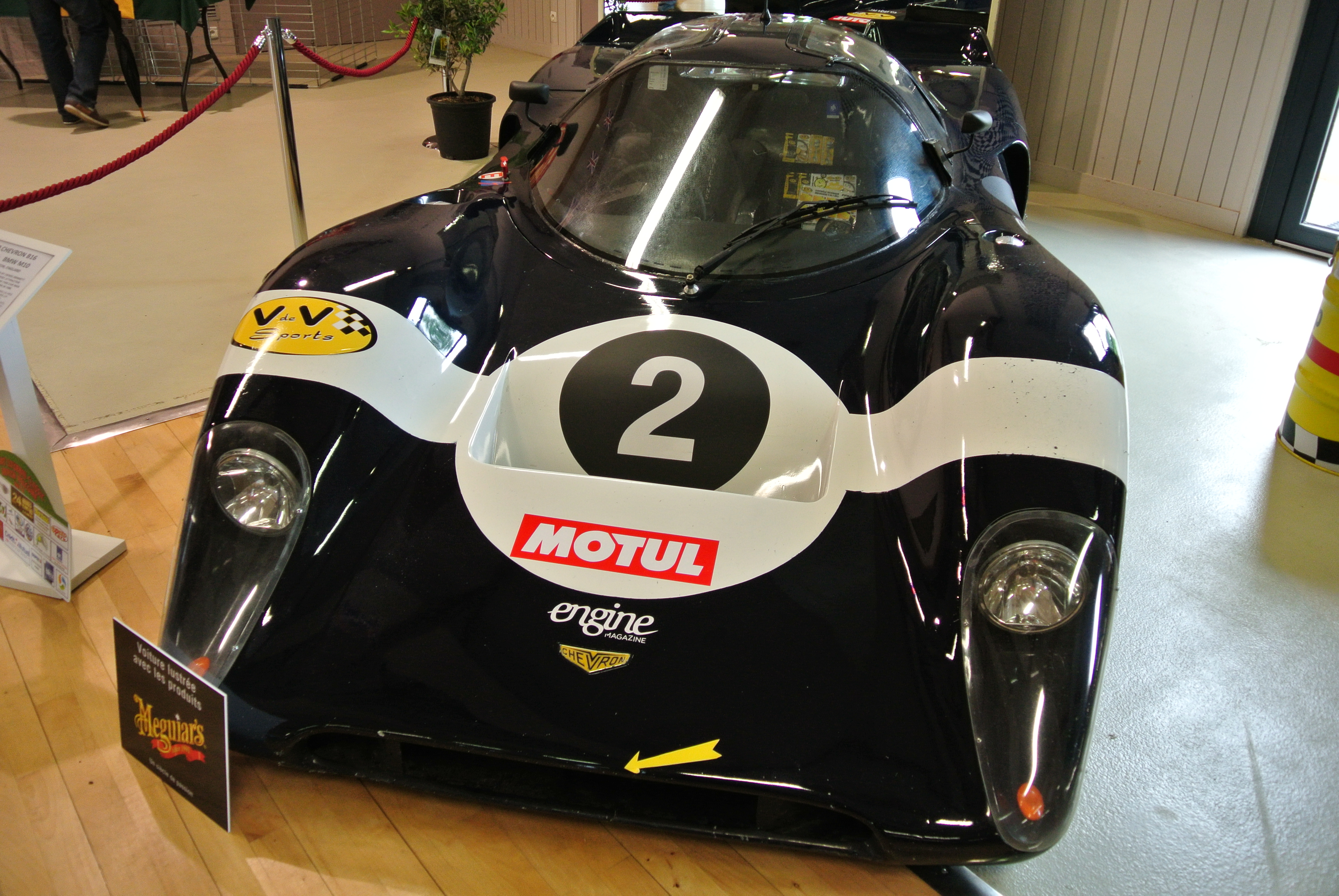
1970 Chevron B16-BMW

=== Chevron B16 BMW (1969-1970) ===
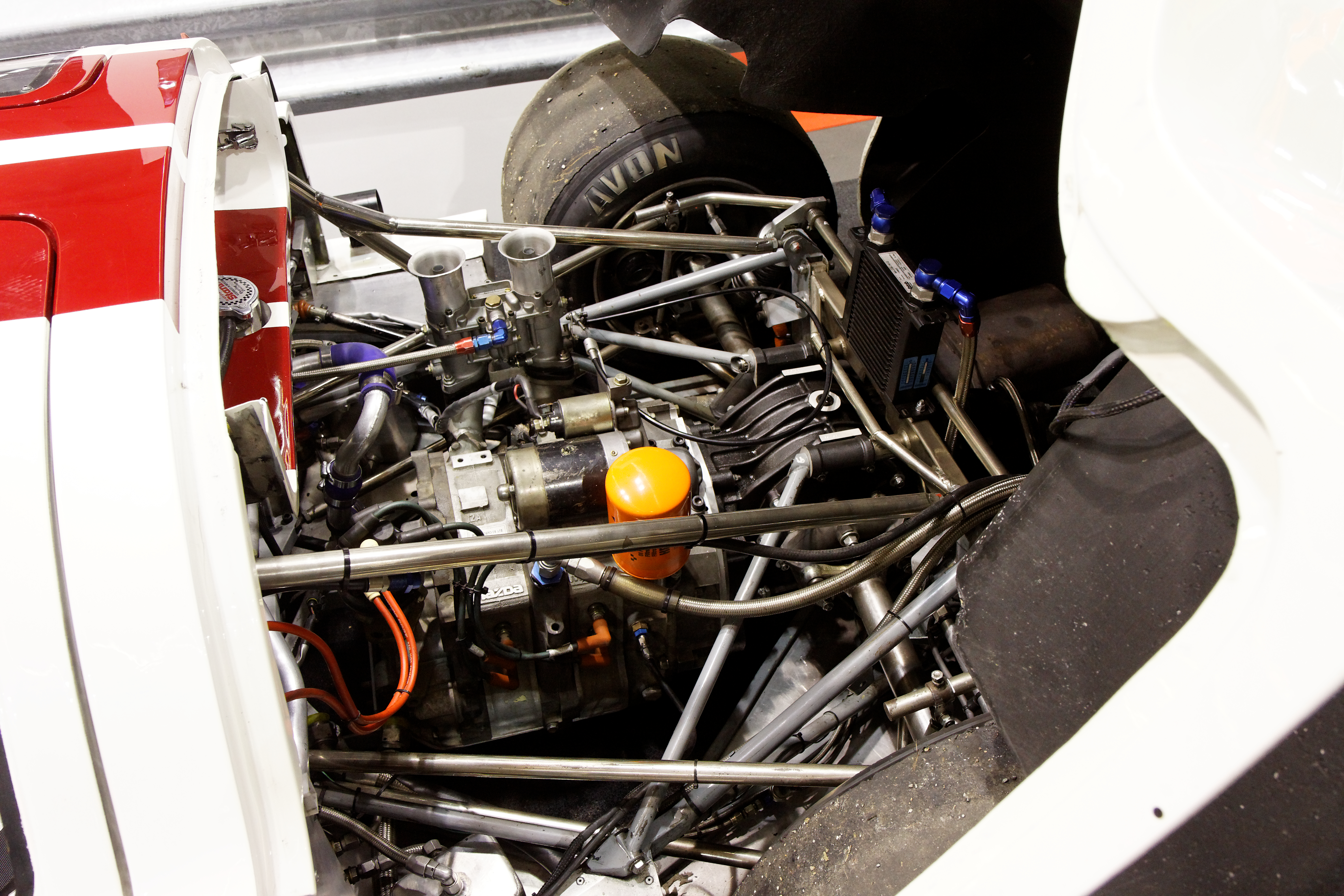
B16 (Mazda) engine bay

- Engine: BMW M10, in-line four-cylinder
- Displacement: 1,990.8 cc (121.49 cu in)
- Bore × Stroke: 89 mm (3.5 in)×80 mm (3.1 in)
- Performance 220 hp (160 kW) at 7800 rpm
- Max. Torque: 210 N⋅m (150 lb⋅ft) @ 6630 rpm
- Mixture preparation Carburettor Weber 45 DCOE
- Transmission: 5-speed gearbox, Hewland FT-200

rear wheel drive

- Body: Glass-fiber reinforced plastic (fiberglass)
- Front suspension: Double wishbone
- Rear suspension: Inverted lower wishbone, upper wishbone,

upper and lower diagonal link

- Steering: Rack and pinion steering
- Brakes Discs: Ø front: 272 mm (10.7 in), rear: 262 mm (10.3 in)
- Wheelbase: 2,340 mm (92 in)
- Wheel size: Front: 8.2/20×13, Rear: 13.0/25.5×13
- Dimensions: L × W × H 4113×1680×920mm
- Curb weight: 590–660 kg (1,300–1,460 lb)
