= Chevron GR8 =

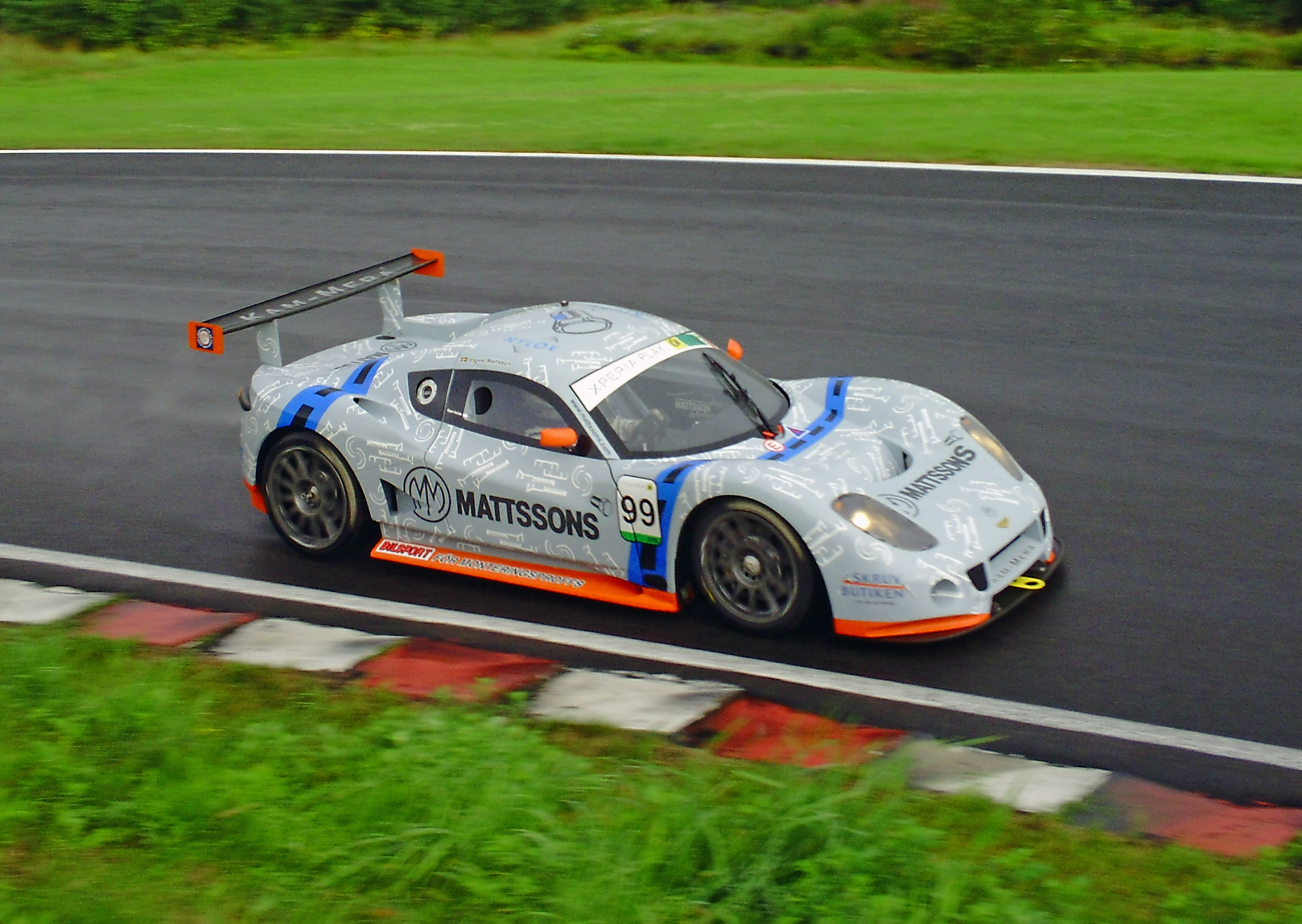
- Category: GT3; GT4
- Constructor: Chevron
- Designer(s): Lester Allen
- Production: 2010-2013

Technical specifications
- Chassis: Fiberglass Reinforced Plastic Body over Steel & Aluminum semi-monocoque or tubular spaceframe
- Suspension: Double wishbones, pushrod actuated coil springs over shock absorbers, anti-roll bar
- Length: 159.5 in (4,050 mm)
- Width: 70.8 in (1,800 mm)
- Wheelbase: 94.5 in (2,400 mm)
- Engine: Mid-engine, longitudinally mounted, 2.0 L (122 cu in), Cosworth YD (Duratec-derived) DOHC I4, NA; Mid-engine, longitudinally mounted, 2.0 L (122 cu in), 3.5 L (214 cu in), Langford/Chevron DOHC V6, NA; Mid-engine, longitudinally mounted, 6.2 L (378 cu in), LS3 OHV V8, NA
- Transmission: Hewland JFR/TMT 5-speed sequential manual
- Power: 255–440 hp (190–328 kW); 190–440 lb⋅ft (260–600 N⋅m)
- Weight: 600–970 kg (1,320–2,140 lb)
- Brakes: AP Racing ventilated discs all-round, 380 mm (15 in)
- Tyres: Pirelli PZero race slicks / lightweight 10-spoke alloys

Competition history
- Debut: 2011 Donington British GT round
Races	Wins	Podiums	Poles
74	2	5	1

The Chevron GR8 is a grand tourer race car, designed, developed and built by British manufacturer Chevron, for sports car racing, conforming to both FIA GT3 and SRO GT4 rules and regulation set by the FIA, and has been produced since 2010.
