= Chevron B3 =

Sports racing car

- Category: Group 4
- Constructor: Chevron
- Designer(s): Derek Bennett
- Production: 1966
- Successor: Chevron B4

Technical specifications
- Chassis: Aluminum-reinforced steel tubular space frame covered in aluminum body panels
- Suspension (front): Double wishbones, coil springs over dampers, anti-roll bar
- Suspension (rear): Lower wishbones, top links, twin trail arms, coil springs over dampers, anti-roll bar
- Engine: Mid-engine, longitudinally mounted, 1.6 L (98 cu in), Ford I4, NA
- Transmission: Hewland FT-200 5-speed manual

Competition history

The Chevron B3 (also known as the Chevron GT) was the first sports racing car that was developed and built by British manufacturer Chevron, in 1966. It was designed by British engineer, Derek Bennett. It was powered by a naturally-aspirated 1.6 L (98 cu in) Ford twin-cam four-cylinder engine. Over its racing career, spanning two years, it won a respectable 8 races (plus 1 additional class win), and took 10 podium finishes.
