= Clubman (racing car class) =

Type of racing car

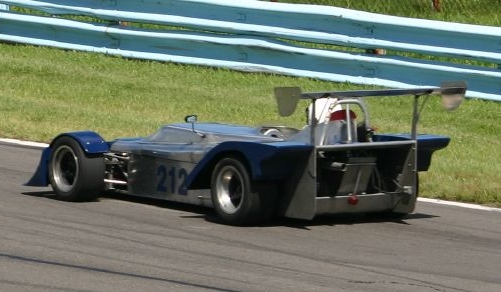
1972 Mallock U2

The Clubman is a class of prototype front-engined sports racing cars that originated in Britain in 1965 as a low-cost formula for open-top, front-engined roadgoing sports cars like the Lotus 7, which had been crowded out of the mainstream by rear-engined cars such as the Lotus 23.

The cars have evolved and specialised, but it remains a very popular class of racing.

The Clubmans Sports Prototype Championship is organised by The Clubmans Register and currently races with MotorSport Vision (MSVR) and is a Motorsport UK (MSUK) recognised club.

The championship runs with four classes; CSP1 for cars up to 2000cc developing 200bhp from 4 cylinder road derived engines or motorcycle engines up to 1600cc. CSP2 for cars using sealed 1600 K series engines developing 125bhp. CSPA for Classic A cars built before 1981. CSPB for Classic B cars built before 1981.

== Birth ==
The class was initiated by Nick Syrett of the British Racing and Sports Car Club (BRSCC) and organised by the Clubmans Register which represent car owners, drivers and constructors.

Clubmans evolved from categories such as the 1,172 cc formula for Ford-based specials and several of the 750MC's entry-level formulae. It was intended as a low-cost formula for open-top, front-engined road-going sports cars like the Lotus 7, which had been crowded out of the mainstream by rear-engined cars such as the Lotus 23. Before long, the cars rapidly evolved into highly specialised and very quick sports-racers – retaining the front-engined/rear wheel drive layout, but acquiring in due course wings and slicks. Unlike endurance-oriented forms of sports car racing, Clubmans tend to run at club-level meetings. Races were typically short (15–30 miles) and driver changes and refueling were not part of the strategy.

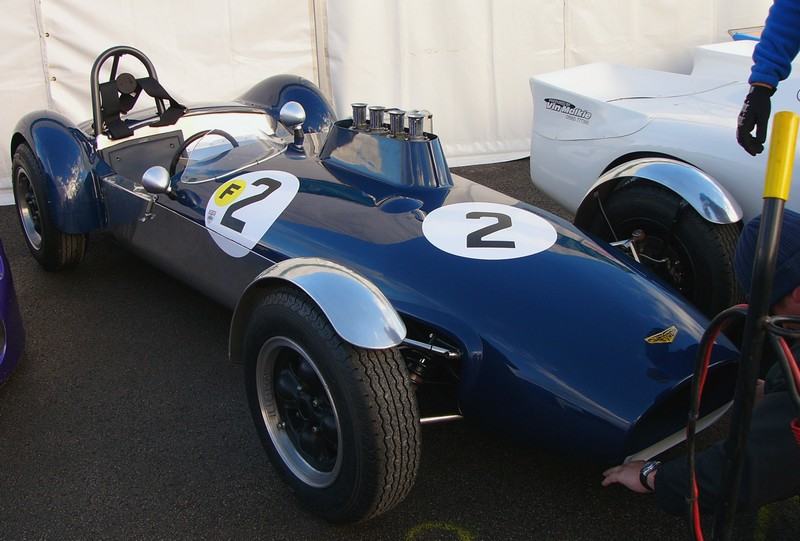
A Chevron B2 Clubmans car

Marques such as Chevron made their debut in the formula and the long-lived series of Mallock U2 cars came to dominate numerically (and often in terms of results). Over the years, marques such as Gryphon, Centaur, Bladon, Haggispeed, Phantom, Vision, Pulsar and Slique as well as specials like the St Bruno Roughcutter and the Hustler graced the grids with varying degrees of success. Clubmans cars also became a popular class in hillclimbing.

Clubmans has remained a relatively low-cost formula with cars having a long life and stability of rules meaning that drivers tend to remain in the formulae and develop their cars. In a straight line, Clubmans cars were often almost as quick as Formula Three single-seaters. The formula acquired a reputation for close competition, varied grids, and a healthy social scene.

== Development ==
Engine rules varied somewhat over time. Initially the formula used 1000 cc or 1500 (later 1600) cc pushrod engines that had to be based on Ford or BMC units – practically, the 1,000 cc units were detuned ex-F3 engines). For most of the formula's life, the engines were the 1000 cc ex F3 units and 1600 cc Ford Kents or Ford-based Holbay, and finally the 1600 Kent in Formula Ford spec ("B sports/Sports 1600") and 1700 cc crossflow units ("A sports") in high states of tune.

As the Ford units drifted into obsolescence, other units replaced them. Sports 1600 gave way to "K Sports" with a Rover K-series engine and the 16-valve two-litre Vauxhall temporarily replaced the 1700 cc Crossflow unit in 1993 for the short-lived rear-engined Supersports category.

Rear-engined cars with the Vauxhall unit were admitted to the series for the first time in 1995 alongside traditional front-engined cars. Seeking a more upmarket image, the alternative formula was renamed National Supersports, but over the years grids declined due to increased costs. Many of the marques that made their debut in National Supersports now compete in alternative prototype series such as Britsports or VdeV, which provide prototype racing on a relatively affordable scale.

== Present-day ==
Clubmans in the UK continues as an affordable form of racing, with two race series catering for "Classic" cars (up to and including 1980, running similarly to the original formula, with classes catering for cars from many periods of the formula's history) and the Clubmans Sports Prototype Championship running in four classes CSP1, CSP2, CSPA and CSPB as described above.

== Outside the UK ==
Clubmans has also been popular in Scandinavia since the 80s when Swedish car enthusiast Stefan Mumm bought a Mallock and promoted the formulae. The results of his enthusiasm are more than 20 cars registered in the series. In addition to the ubiquitous Mallock, local marques such as Bodin and Phantom are now produced and are still being developed; in 2008 three brand new cars were produced. The Scandinavian Clubmans class uses 1800 cc Ford Zetec engine, and is one of the fastest sportscar series in Scandinavia.

Australia has also had a thriving clubman class since the 50's known as the Clubman Sports 1300 class based on 1300cc engine cars. this has now morphed in the Supersports class which allows rear engines and motorbike powered cars where the original clubman class did not.

Clubmans cars also compete in the US, Canada, New Zealand, South Africa, and Switzerland.

== List of Clubmans Cars ==
Brand	Chassis	Image
Chevron	B1	
Chevron	B2	
Lotus	Seven	
Mallock	M21B	
Mallock	Mk.XI	
Mallock	U2	
Phantom	PR22	
Phantom	PR24	
