= Chevron B4 =

Sports racing car

- Category: Group 4
- Constructor: Chevron
- Designer(s): Derek Bennett
- Production: 1966
- Predecessor: Chevron B3
- Successor: Chevron B5

Technical specifications
- Chassis: Aluminum-reinforced steel tubular space frame covered in aluminum body panels
- Suspension (front): Double wishbones, coil springs over dampers, anti-roll bar
- Suspension (rear): Lower wishbones, top links, twin trail arms, coil springs over dampers, anti-roll bar
- Engine: Mid-engine, longitudinally mounted, 2.0 L (122 cu in), BMW I4, NA
- Transmission: Hewland FT-200 5-speed manual

Competition history

The Chevron B4 was the second sports racing car to be developed and built by British manufacturer Chevron, in 1966. It was designed by British engineer, Derek Bennett. It was powered by a naturally-aspirated BMW M10 four-cylinder engine. Over its racing career, spanning two years, it only managed to score one class win, with its best race result being a 4th-place finish. Only one single model was built.
