= Chevron B6 =

Sports racing car

- Category: Group 4
- Constructor: Chevron
- Designer(s): Derek Bennett
- Production: 1967
- Predecessor: Chevron B5
- Successor: Chevron B8

Technical specifications
- Chassis: Aluminum-reinforced steel tubular space frame covered in aluminum body panels
- Suspension (front): Double wishbones, coil springs over dampers, anti-roll bar
- Suspension (rear): Lower wishbones, top links, twin trail arms, coil springs over dampers, anti-roll bar
- Wheelbase: 2,340 mm (92 in)
- Engine: Mid-engine, longitudinally mounted, 2.0 L (122 cu in), BMW M10 I4, NA
- Transmission: Hewland FT-200 5-speed manual
- Power: 240 hp (180 kW)
- Weight: 600 kg (1,300 lb)

Competition history

The Chevron B6 is a lightweight sports racing car, designed, developed and built by British manufacturer Chevron Cars, in 1967. Only 7 cars were built, which makes it very rare. Over its career, spanning 8 years, it won a total of 15 races, plus 4 additional class wins, clinched 1 pole position, and scored 30 total podium finishes.
