= Chevron B5 =

Sports racing car

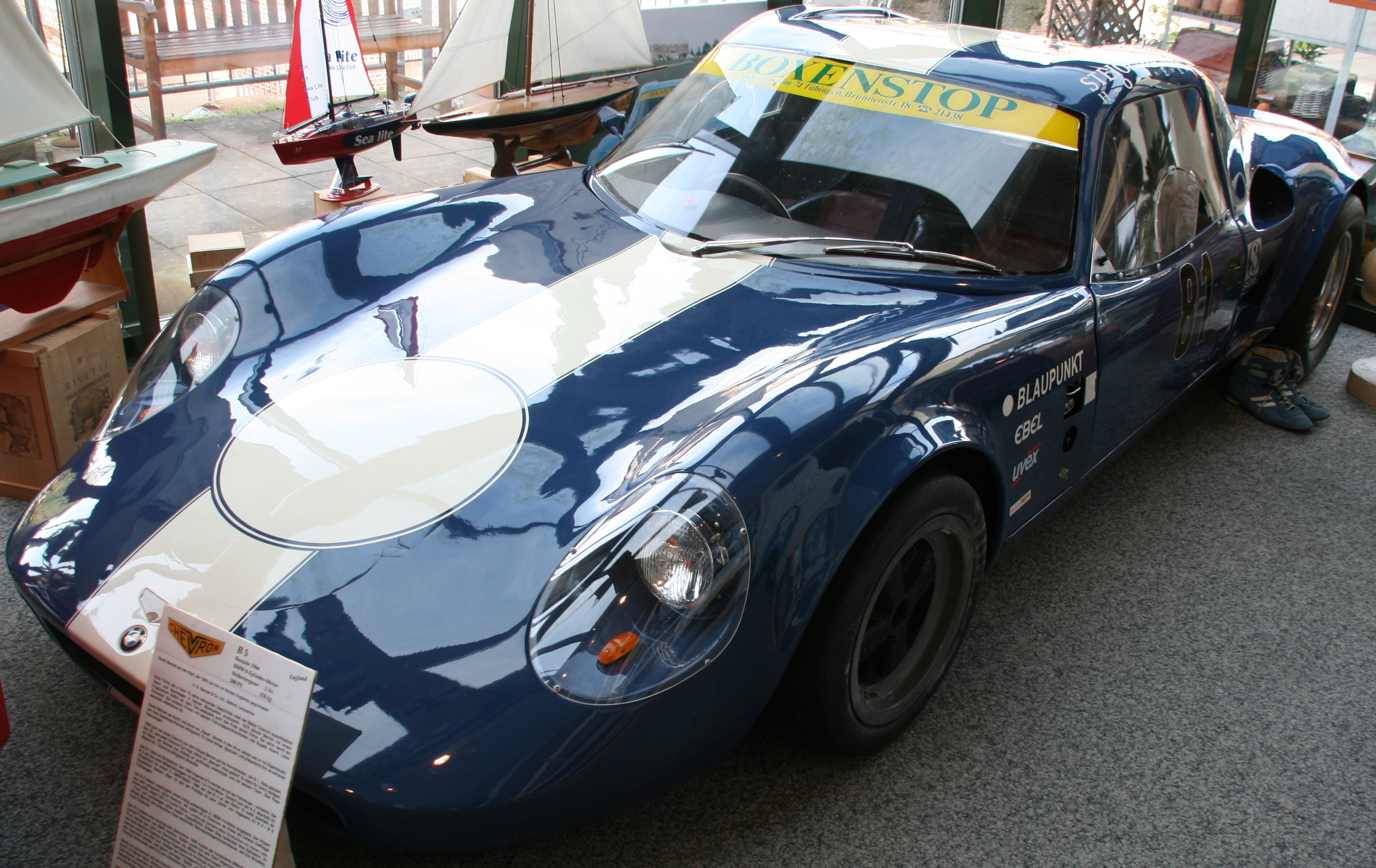
- Category: Group 4
- Constructor: Chevron
- Designer(s): Derek Bennett
- Production: 1967
- Predecessor: Chevron B4
- Successor: Chevron B6

Technical specifications
- Chassis: Aluminum-reinforced steel tubular space frame covered in aluminum body panels
- Suspension (front): Double wishbones, coil springs over dampers, anti-roll bar
- Suspension (rear): Lower wishbones, top links, twin trail arms, coil springs over dampers, anti-roll bar
- Engine: Mid-engine, longitudinally mounted, 2.0 L (122 cu in), BRM V8, NA
- Transmission: Hewland FT-200 5-speed manual

Competition history

The Chevron B5 is a sports racing car, designed and developed by British manufacturer Chevron, and built by David Bridges, in 1967. Only one single car was constructed. It was powered by a naturally-aspirated 2.0 L (120 cu in) BRM V8 engine. Over its racing career, spanning 4 years, it won a total of 3 races, and scored 7 podium finishes.
