= Chevron B1 =

Car built by Chevron

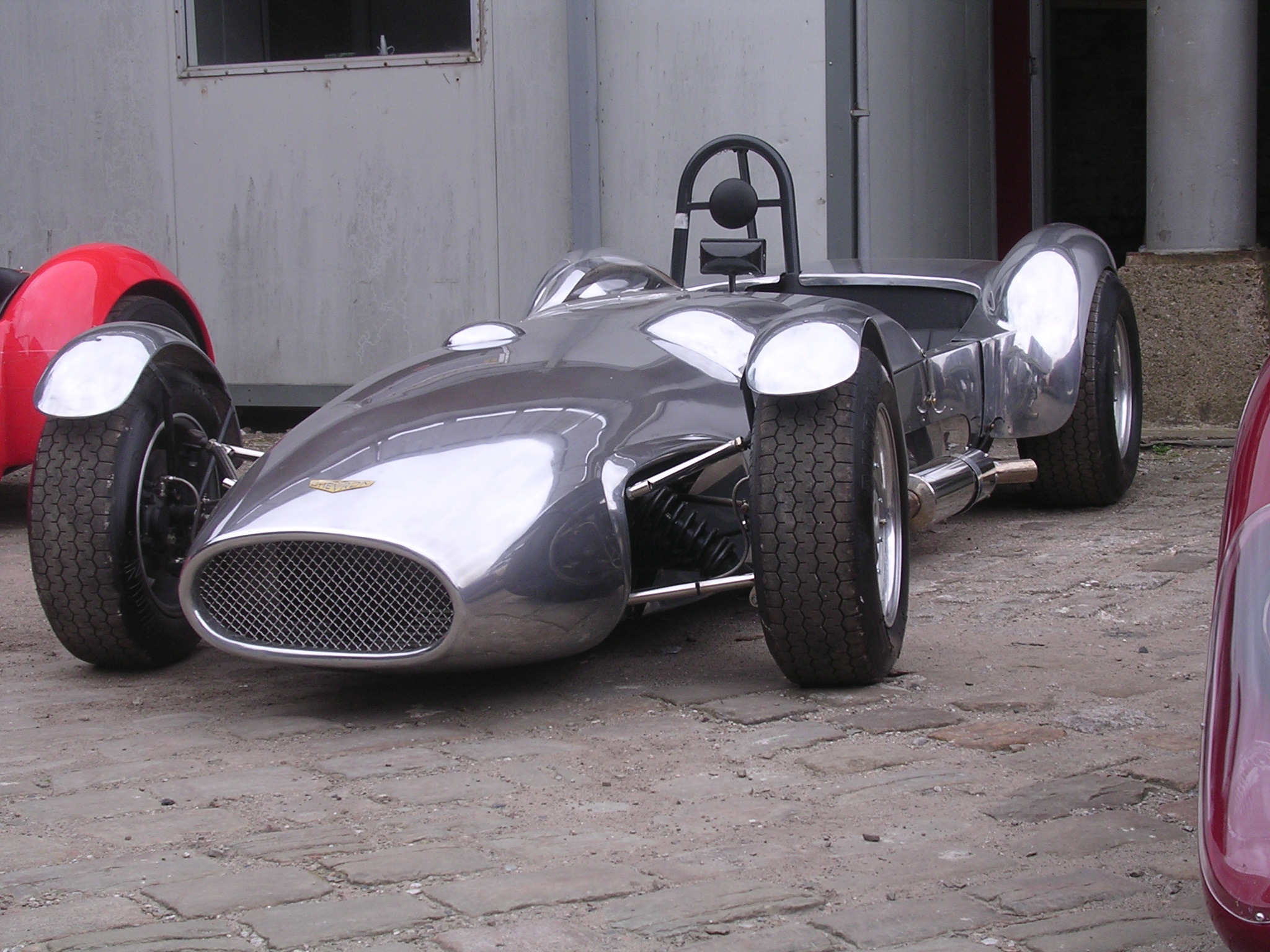
Chevron B1

The Chevron B1 was the first car to be developed and built by British manufacturer Chevron, in 1965. Designed by Derek Bennett, it was lightweight open-wheel sports car, specifically intended and purpose-built to compete in the clubman class series of racing; a series for front-engined sports prototypes. Over its five-year career span, it won 7 races, scored 18 podium finishes, won an additional 8 races in its class, and scored one single pole position. Only two car were built. It was constructed out of a steel tubular spaceframe chassis, covered in aluminum body panels. This meant it was very light, weighing only 400 kg (880 lb). It was powered by a naturally-aspirated 1,498 cc (91.4 cu in) Ford-Cosworth.
