= Simon Atkinson =

British architect

Simon Atkinson is a British architect, currently the Mike Hogg Centennial Professor in Community and Regional Planning at University of Texas at Austin and Fellow of the Royal Society of Arts.
