= Chevron B8 =

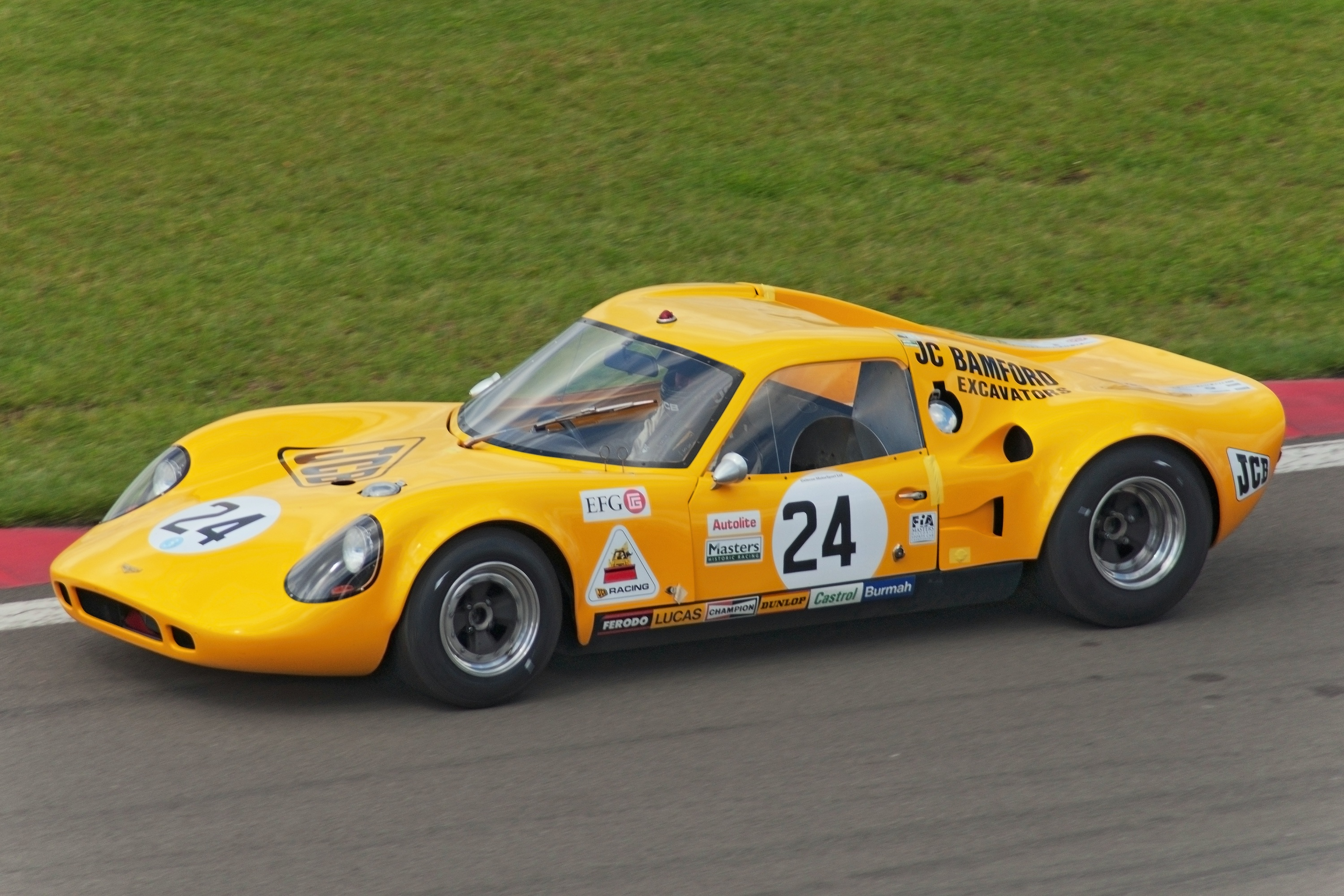
- Category: Group 6 Group 4
- Constructor: Chevron
- Designer(s): Derek Bennett
- Production: 1968-1970
- Predecessor: Chevron B6
- Successor: Chevron B16

Technical specifications
- Chassis: Steel-reinforced tubular space frame covered in fiberglass body panels
- Suspension (front): Double wishbones, coil springs over dampers, anti-roll bar
- Suspension (rear): Lower wishbones, top links, twin trail arms, coil springs over dampers, anti-roll bar
- Engine: Mid-engine, longitudinally mounted, 1.6–2.75 L (98–168 cu in), Cosworth FVA, BMW M10, Coventry Climax FPF, I4, NA
- Transmission: 5-speed manual
- Weight: 550 kg (1,210 lb)

Competition history

The Chevron B8 is a lightweight sports racing car, designed, developed and built by British manufacturer Chevron Cars, in 1968. It is homologated in the Prototype category of the International Automobile Federation. It won thirty-six races during its various engagements. Only 44 cars were built.

== Technical ==
It was powered by the different four-cylinder engines; including a Ford-Cosworth FVA, a BMW M10, and a Coventry Climax FPF. Power output ranged between 200–225 hp (149–168 kW).

== Racing history ==
The B8 entered the competition for the first time in 1967, on the occasion of the Danube Cup. Digby Martland finished sixth overall behind the wheel 4.

The Chevron B8 actively contested in racing competitions until 1986. Over its career, spanning 10 years, it won a total of 52 races, and scored 127 podium finishes, took 18 fastest race laps, and won 45 races in its class, respectively.
