= Chevron Cars Ltd =

English manufacturer of racing cars

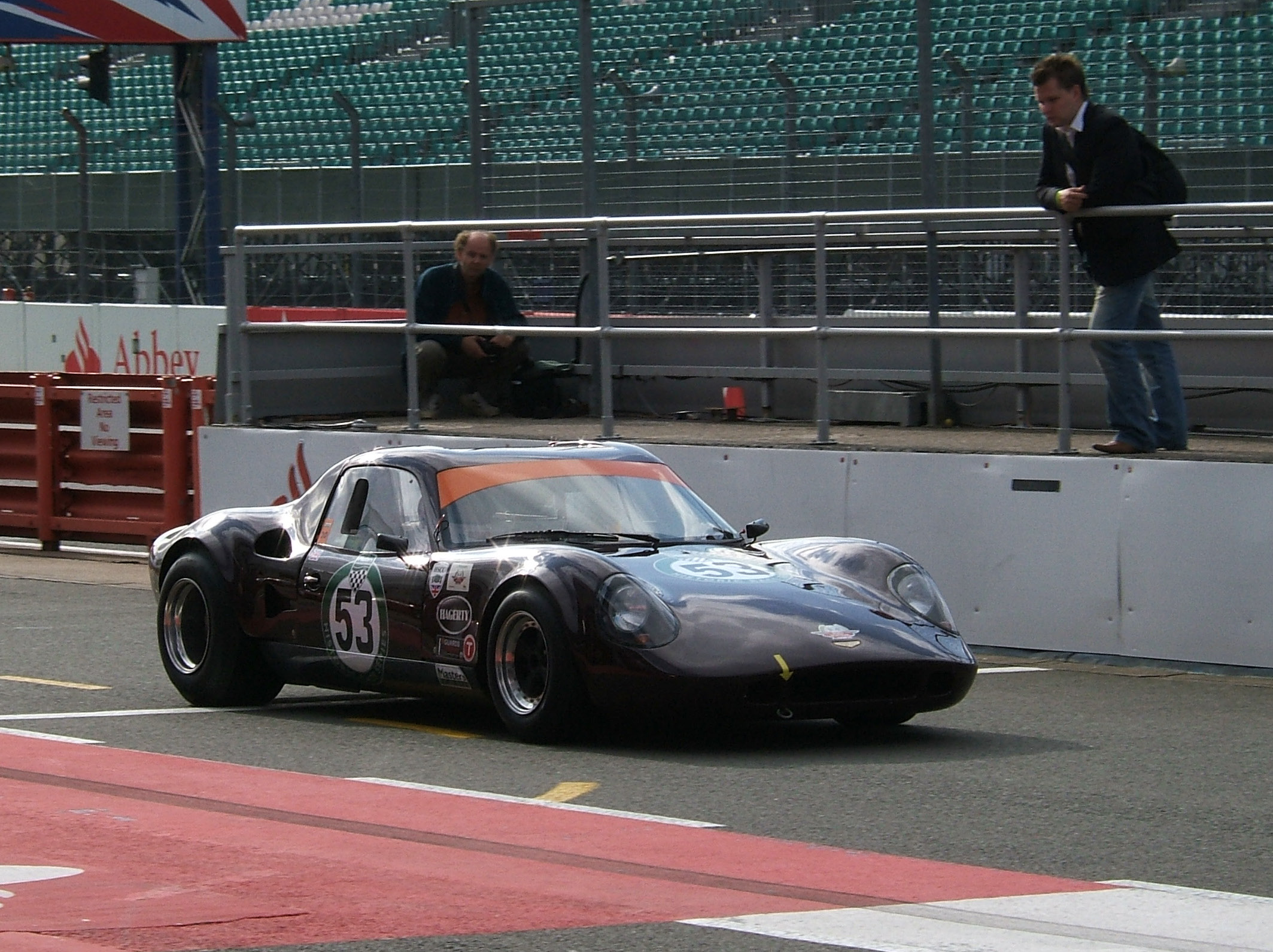
Chevron B8

Chevron Cars Ltd. is an English manufacturer of racing cars, founded by Derek Bennett in 1965. Following Bennett's death in 1978, the firm has remained active in various guises. The original company's designs and name continue to be used to build replacement parts and continuation models of earlier Chevrons. In 2000, Chevron Racing Cars Ltd., founded by Vin Malkie acquired the trade mark Chevron Racing Cars Ltd and in addition to the company's other activities has designed and built new grand tourer racing cars under the Chevron name, as well as other continuation models of earlier Chevrons.

== History ==
=== Derek Bennett ===
Derek Bennett was born in 1933 in Manchester and was brought up in Prestwich. He was a largely self-taught, intuitive engineer and a talented amateur racing driver.

In his early years Bennett took a keen interest in model aircraft. He took an apprenticeship in mechanical and electrical engineering before becoming a mechanic, but he soon fell in with motor racing scene in the North of England, initially in local stock-car racing events.

Bennett soon graduated to building, maintaining and also driving racing cars for himself and other local enthusiasts, and established himself as a competitive driver at club level, particularly in the Bennett Special, running in a series for 1172cc Ford powered cars; he later moved into the Clubmans category. Bennett also built a one-off Formula Junior car which was only a modest success - rear-engined competition from Lotus and Cooper was more than a match for it, and the era of the special-builder in FJ was over.

By 1965 there were sufficient requests for replicas of his Clubmans car, Bennett seemed able to establish himself as a constructor and started his business and the Chevron marque in School Street, Salford. Aided by a small staff of like-minded enthusiasts (particularly friend and assistant Paul Owens), for a decade and a half Chevron produced successful racing cars.

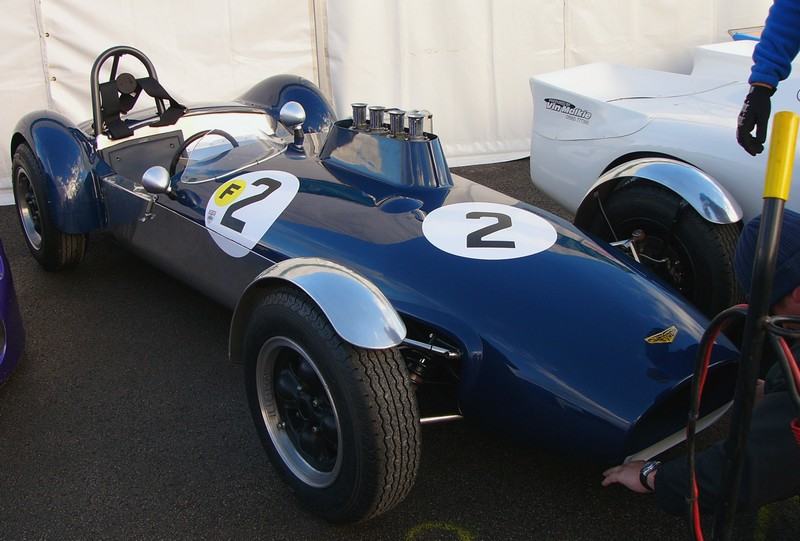
Chevron B2, Aintree Festival of Motorsport, 2004

Bennett never proceeded beyond Formula Three in his own driving but remained quick enough to test and develop many of his cars, especially at the nearby Oulton Park and Aintree.

He was working on a Formula One Chevron when he was killed in a hang-gliding accident in 1978.

=== Chevron cars ===
Chevron was particularly noted for its small-capacity sports cars and its Formula Two, Formula Three and Formula 5000 single-seaters. Although a Chevron F5000 did beat a representative Formula One field once in a race open to both categories (Peter Gethin at the Race of Champions in 1973), the marque never seriously addressed F1; one F1 car was built but not finished in Bennett's lifetime and when complete was run only in the national-level Aurora F1 championship in Britain. Bennett was notable for the first car with a diffuser - Chevron GT, the first car with a crash box (called a "nose frame" in its day) Chevron B16.

Although the first Chevrons were developments of Derek Bennett's Clubmans special (Clubmans is a British national formula for front-engined open-top sports cars with Ford engines) the firm's customers soon started looking to more ambitious racing, and a line of gran turismo cars was soon established with the B3 (early type numbers were applied retroactively when the cars were homologated for Group 4 and 5 racing) which developed into a line of successful BMW and Ford-powered cars capable of competing internationally in the two-litre sports car class. The replacement for these cars was the B16, but driver Brian Redman pointed out that with heavy coupé bodywork it would be beaten on most circuits by lighter open-topped spyders from marques like Abarth. The B16 spyder was introduced, with a body inspired by the Porsche 908 spyder (which Redman also drove) and this started a long line of successful two-litre sports racers including the B19, B21, B23, B26, and B31.

Chevron was active and very successful in single-seater formulae during this period, concentrating mostly upon Formula 3 Formula Two and Formula Atlantic (aka SCCA Formula B) with minor variants of the same basic design. Nearly every Formula 1 driver of the 1970s drove a Chevron in their early careers including Niki Lauda.

Chevron was notable for its proud Lancastrian nature - unlike the rest of the British racing car industry which tended to be based in an arc running from South West London, the old Brooklands circuit and Heathrow Airport round to Silverstone, Chevron remained based in a mill in Bolton, and many of its most celebrated drivers, including Brian Redman and Jim Crawford Scottish, actually, were also Lancastrians. Many of Chevron's notable customers were also from the north of England including John Bridges, Digby Martland, and John Lepp.

The heyday of the marque ran through to the late 1970s and ended with Derek Bennett's death after a hang-gliding accident in 1978; Chevron continued in its original form owned by Derek's sisters for a couple of years with Tony Southgate as consultant designer then passed into other hands - some new cars were manufactured. Several key Chevron employees, including designer Paul Brown and co-founder and director Owens, also worked on the short-lived Maurer Formula Two cars, and later as a director at Reynard.

Some of the assets of the liquidated Derek Bennett Engineering Ltd were bought by a consortium of Scottish racing drivers and enthusiasts who formed Chevron Racing Cars (Scotland) Ltd as did other parties including Vin Malkie and Helen Bashford. This company produced spare parts for the range of Chevron cars as well as designing and building a few new Sports 2000 and Formula Atlantic models up until 1983 when this company also liquidated. Roger Andreason, whose Andreason Racing and Tuning business was, at that time running several Chevron cars for customers, purchased the assets of the liquidated Scottish consortium Under control of Roger Andreason Chevron Cars Ltd. produced over 50 cars for Formula Ford, Formula Ford 2000, Sports 2000 and Group C categories - as well as maintaining the spare part service for existing Chevron owners.

In 2000 Vin Malkie, one of the original Chevron employees and owner of the first Chevron B1, produced, along with his wife and successful racing driver Helen Bashford-Malkie, acquired the Chevron trade mark and Chevron name. They continued their existing business as Chevron restorers and race preparers. They have since produced technically correct continuation models using largely original jigs and drawings, Vin and Helen still consulted with many of the original Chevron employees on a regular basis, not least Paul Owens, as part of their restoration process. in 2011 in partnership with an investor they produced the Chevron GR8 and later the GR8 GT, campaigning successfully with BARC and the later GT car in British GT winning Goodwood Festival of Speed with race car driver Anthony Reid.

In 2006 Chris Smith purchased a majority share holding in the newly started company called Chevron Cars Ltd., from the owners Roger Andreason and Tim Colman. Both remained minority shareholders, with Colman remaining as a director. The following five years saw Smith invest substantially in Chevron. During this time he oversaw the construction of around 10 "continuation" B8 and B16 models, which were assembled by Kelvin Jones of Kelvin Jones Motorsport based in Liverpool. In July 2011, Andreason and Colman bought back Smith's shareholding and Andreason was re-appointed as the managing director of Chevron Cars Limited, selling this company name in 2010.

In November 2016 the custodians of the marque for 35 years Vin Malkie and Helen Bashford-Malkie sold the Chevron group of companies including the IP, trademark, Chevron name including copyright to the trademark to WDK Holdings, Directors Nicola Foulston and Ian Cox who continue to manufacture Chevron components, cars, restorations and race preparation from their UK base in Stockbridge, Hampshire. Helen and Vin are to remain as consultants.

In 2021 Chevron Racing Cars ltd and Derek Bennett engineering ltd companies were acquired by David Beecroft from Nicola FOULSTON and the Velocity group along with the trade mark for use of the Chevron name and logo to be used on new ventures. Beecroft a life long fan of Bennett’s designs having grown up close to the Bolton Chevron factory.

The Chevron name and logo has now been put to use on the new for 2025 TOCA Junior Championship car.

== Modern Chevrons ==
Chevrons are popular cars in historic racing and various businesses still recondition and supply spares for the cars. Continuation models of the 1970s Chevron B16 are built by both Chevron Cars and Chevron Racing, and are eligible for historic racing with FIA approval. As Oulton Park had been Bennett's home circuit, the Gold Cup meeting features races dedicated solely to Chevron's sports cars.

Chevron Racing has developed a GR8 model which competes in the British GT Championship as well as in a one-make series.

== Cars ==
The following models were built by Chevron.

Year	Model	Image	Category	Notes
1965	B1		Clubmans Formula	
1966	B2		Clubmans Formula	
1966	B3-Ford		GT	B3-B6, B8 and B12 all basically similar
1966	B4-BMW		GT	For a detailed history of this model including photographs and race results, see the current owner's website http://www.chevronb4.co.uk
1967	B5-BRM		GT	
1967	B6-Ford/BMW		GT	
1967	B7		Formula 3	
1968	B8		GT/Group 4	
1968	B9/B9B		Formula 3	
1968	B10		Formula 2	
1968	B12		GT	Lengthened B8 for John Woolf's Le Mans entry
1968	B14		Formula B	
1969	B15/B15B/B15C		Formula 3/FB	
1969	B16 Coupe		G5/G6	
1969	B16 Spyder		G6	Effectively the prototype for B19 - Porsche 908-like spyder body on B16 chassis
1970	B17/B/C		F2/F3/FB	
1970	B18		F2/Atlantic/B	
1971	B19		G6	Progenitor of the B19/B21/B23/B26/B31 line of open sports cars.
1971	B20		F2/Atlantic	
1972	B21		G5/G6	
1972	B24		F5000	Beat mixed F1/F5000 field in Peter Gethin's hands.
1973	B23		G6	
1973	B25		F2/Atlantic	
1973	B26		G6	
1974	B27		F2/Atlantic	
1974	B28		F5000	
1975	B29		F2/Atlantic	
1975	B30		F5000	3.5l Cosworth V6, not 5.0l Ford V8. F5000 champion with David Purley.
1975	B31		G6	In 1975 Chevron B31s driven by several drivers won the under 2-litre class of several rounds of the World Championship for Sportscars. (The over 2 litre class was won by Alfa Romeo's flat-12s.) A total of 6 B31s were constructed and at least two continue to contest vintage race events in the U.S.
1975	B32		Special	One-off hillclimb special (owing much to F5000 practice) for John Cussins with 5.7 Chevy. Ran in match race against a motorbike on part of the Isle of Man TT course.
1976	B34		F3/Atlantic	
1976	B35		F2/Atlantic	A revised version appeared in 1977 as the B40.
1976	B36		G6	
1976	B37		F5000	Only one ever B37 built - chassis number B37-001. Built for Peter Gethin and run by the VDS team, equipped with a Chevrolet V8 5-litre engine. Car was sold to Australian Bruce Allison and competed in the 1978 Rothmans International Series. Was sold again in 1980 to Australian engineer Ivan Tighe. Tighe competed in numerous circuit races including the 1980 Australian Grand Prix in "the 5000". The "5000" slowly retired from circuit racing to become a hillclimb car, culminating in an outright win in the 1985 Australian Hillclimb Championship for Ivan Tighe (at the age of 55, another win came shortly after his 60th birthday in 1991); the car was retired until 1995 when Ivan's son Dean restored the car and continued to hillclimb the vehicle as well as do demonstrations at historic events. Dean's best result was equal second outright at the 1997 Australian Hillclimb Championship in the rain on slick tires. The vehicle was sold back to the UK in 2000.
1977	B38		F3	A development of the B34 from the previous year; lighter, somewhat stronger, and with minor geometric changes to the front suspension with a 5 cm (2 in) wider track. A rollbar ahead of the steering wheel was added, while the cockpit surround was made lower. The rear wing was also redesigned.
1977	B39		Atlantic	Very similar to B40, both developed from the B35.
1977	B40		F2	A development of the B35 corresponding to the modifications of the B38 over the B34. Some teams reverted to the B35 wing.
1978	B41		F1	Essentially hand-built by Bennett himself and unfinished at the time of his death. Effectively obsolete before it turned a wheel as it was not a ground effect car. Raced as a 'scholarship car' by Graham Eden racing with Durex sponsorship in the Aurora AFX F1 series in Britain, with different young drivers trying the car.
1978	B42		F2	
1978	B43		F3	
1978	B45		Atlantic	
1978	B46		FSV	
1979	B47		F3	
1979	B48		F2	Tony Southgate became 'consultant designer' and updated the existing cars with ground-effects for 1979.
1979	B49		Atlantic	
1979	B50		FSV	
1980	B51		Can-Am	
1980	B52		Sports 2000	First raced August 1980. Continued in low-level production when Robin Smith owned Chevron.
1980	B53		F3	Planned, never built.
1981	B53		Atlantic	Built when Robin Smith owned Chevron.
1981 or 1982	B54		S2000	
1982	B56		Atlantic	Raced in 1982 UK Atlantic series. Built when Robin Smith owned Chevron.
1982	B60		Thundersports	Built for the British Thundersports category and ran with a 2-litre engine and B36 bodywork. Built when Robin Smith owned Chevron.
1983	B61		Thundersports	May have been used as a Sports 2000 as well. May have been the only car current when Smith sold Chevron to Roger Andreason.
1985	B62		Group C2	Built when Roger Andreason owned Chevron. 1 built.
1985	B63		S2000	Sports 2000
1985	B64		Formula Atlantic	Built when Roger Andreason owned Chevron. The last Chevron, 1 built.
1986	B65		Group C2	Built by Race Cars UK for Chevron Race Cars USA. One built.
1998	B75		Kadet	10 built only one known to be still alive, that being B75-1998-10.
2010	GR8		GT	Built by Vin Malkie's Chevron Racing Cars Ltd.

== Superstition ==
There is no B11, B22, B33, or B44. Derek Bennett was involved in an accident at Oulton Park to which the number 11 was variously connected, and as a result of this acquired a superstition about using the number, and its multiples. This superstition extended to the numbering of individual chassis, with no original Chevron chassis numbered in a multiple of 11.

== See also ==
- Reynard Motorsport
- Lola Cars
