= János Wimpffen =

American journalist

János L. Wimpffen (born 1950s, Graz, Austria) is an American motorsport historian and writer of Austro-Hungarian origin who specialises in sportscar racing; he is best known for his 1999 debut book Time and Two Seats, which won multiple awards.

He is a personal historian of the car collection for Bruce McCaw of McCaw Cellular Communications.

He subsequently published a series of picture books to accompany Time and Two Seats, despite being by a different publisher. Wimpffen currently resides in Seattle.

== Works ==
- Time and Two Seats
- Open Roads & Front Engines
- Winged Sports Cars and Enduring Innovation
- Spyders & Silhouettes
- Monocoques & Ground Effects
