= Sports car racing =

Type of motorsport road racing

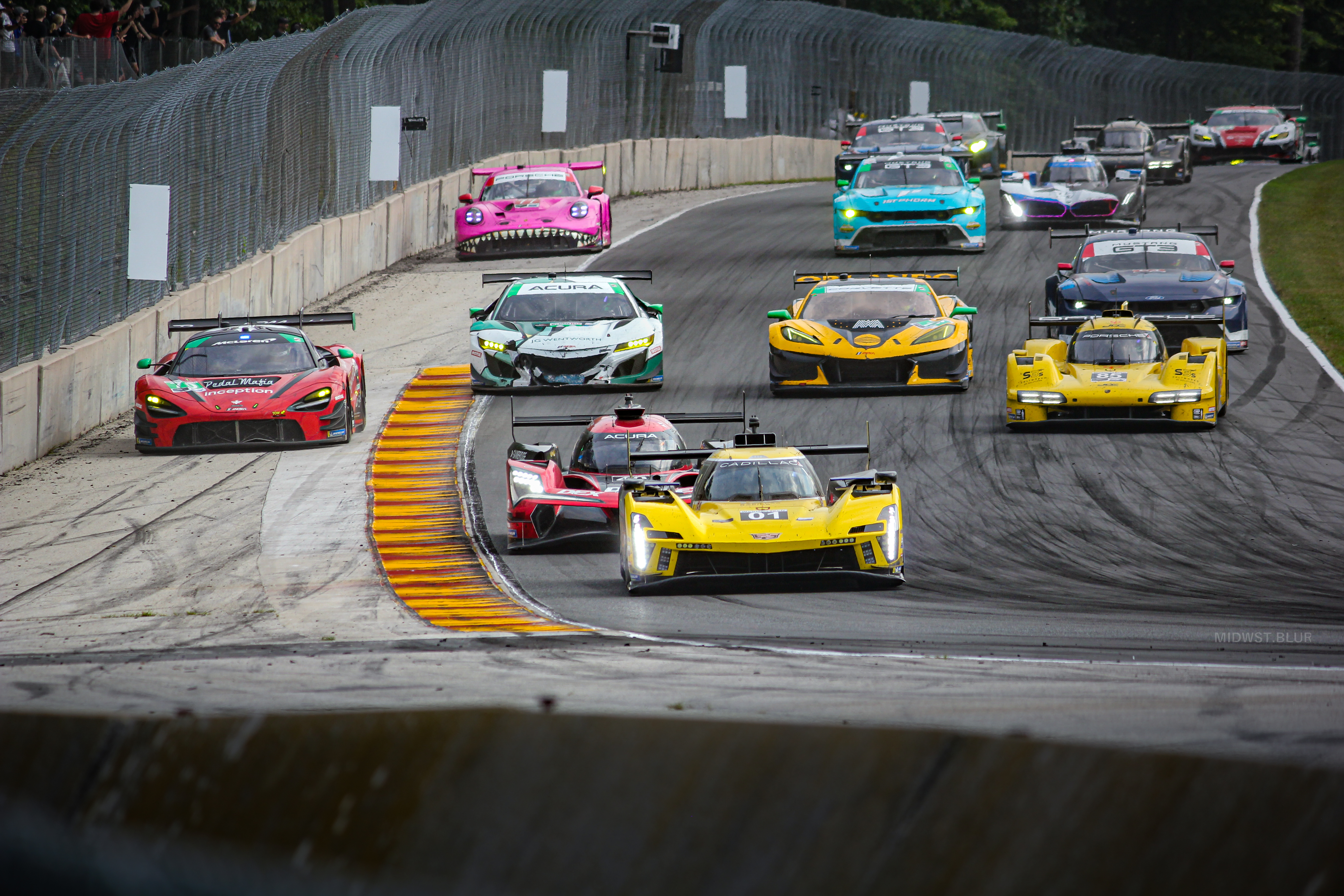
- LMDh and GT3 sports cars at Road America in 2024
- Highest governing body: ACO (1923–present); FIA (2012–present); IMSA (1969–present); GARRA (2000–2013)

Characteristics
- Contact: Yes
- Team members: Yes
- Mixed-sex: Yes
- Type: Outdoor
- Equipment: Sports cars
- Venue: Road and street courses (Oval minority)

Sports car racing is a form of motorsport road racing that involves sports cars with two seats and enclosed wheels. The cars used may be either purpose-built sports prototypes, which represent the highest level of sports car racing – or grand tourer (GT) cars, which are based on road-going production models and are more common but generally slower than prototypes.

Sports car races are often endurance races held over long distances or extended periods of time, typically ranging from 6 to 24 hours. As a result, these races place greater emphasis on reliability, fuel efficiency, and driver consistency than outright speed or individual driver performance.

Some of the best-known sports car racing series include the FIA World Endurance Championship, the IMSA SportsCar Championship, and the GT World Challenge.

Sports car racing is one of the main categories of circuit auto racing, alongside open-wheel racing, touring car racing and stock car racing. Success in the sport has helped build the prestige of various car manufacturers, such as Alfa Romeo, Aston Martin, Audi, Bentley, BMW, Chevrolet, Ferrari, Jaguar, Lamborghini, Lancia, Lotus, Maserati, Mercedes-Benz, and Porsche. These makers' top road cars have often been similar in engineering and styling to those raced. This close association with the exotic nature of the cars distinguishes between sports car racing and touring cars.

The 24 Hours of Daytona, 12 Hours of Sebring, and 24 Hours of Le Mans are considered the Triple Crown of endurance racing. Other crown-jewel sports car endurance races include Petit Le Mans, Nürburgring 24 Hours, Spa 24 Hours, Bathurst 12 Hour and Suzuka 1000km.

== History ==
=== Evolution ===
According to historian Richard Hough, "It is obviously impossible to distinguish between the designers of sports cars and Grand Prix machines during the pre-1914 period. The late Georges Faroux contended that sports-car racing was not born until the first 24 Hours of Le Mans race in 1923, and while as a joint-creator of that race he may have been prejudiced in his opinion, it is certainly true that sports-car racing as it was known after 1919 did not exist before the First World War."

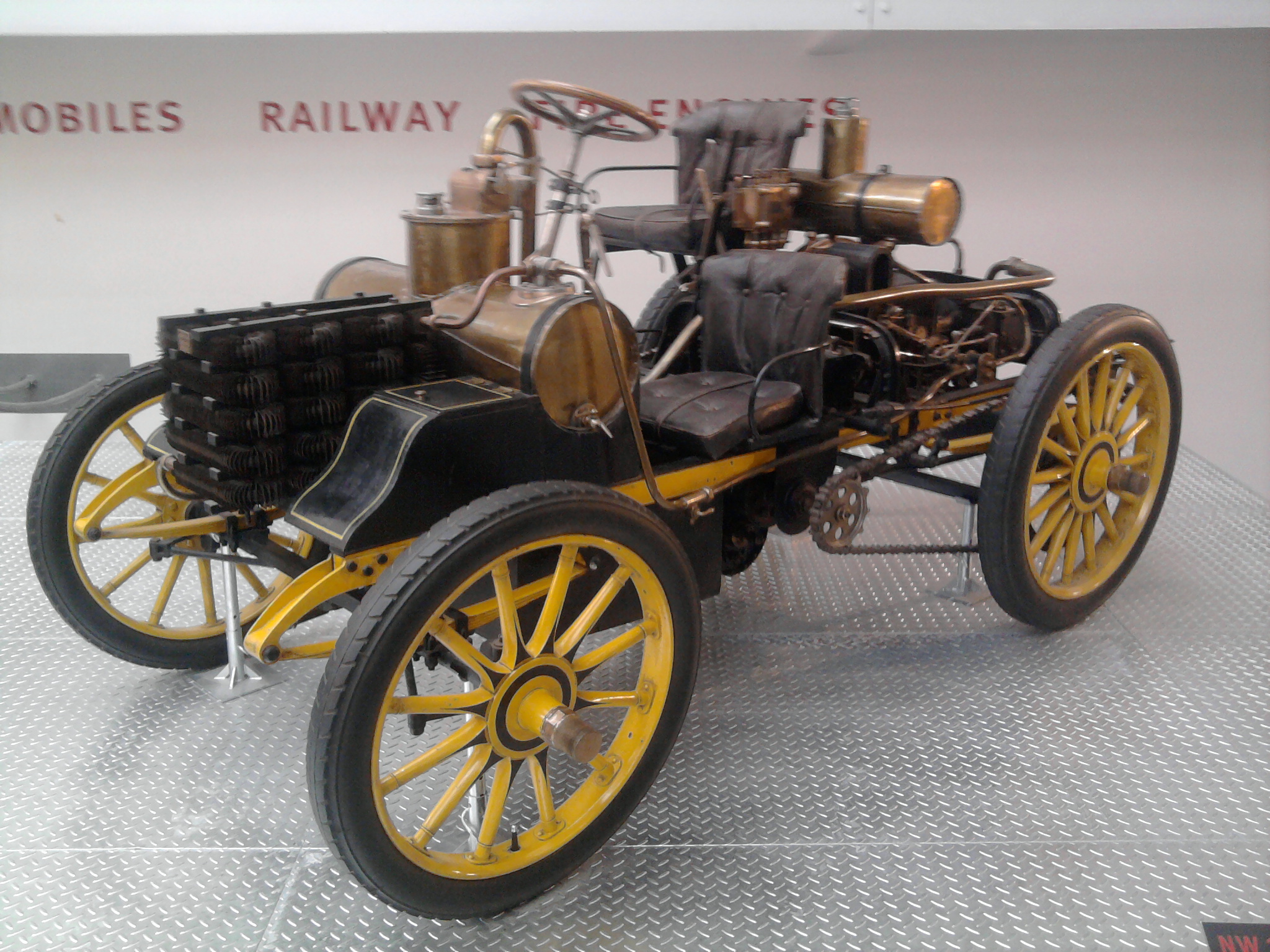
1900 NW Rennzweier (The Double Racer)

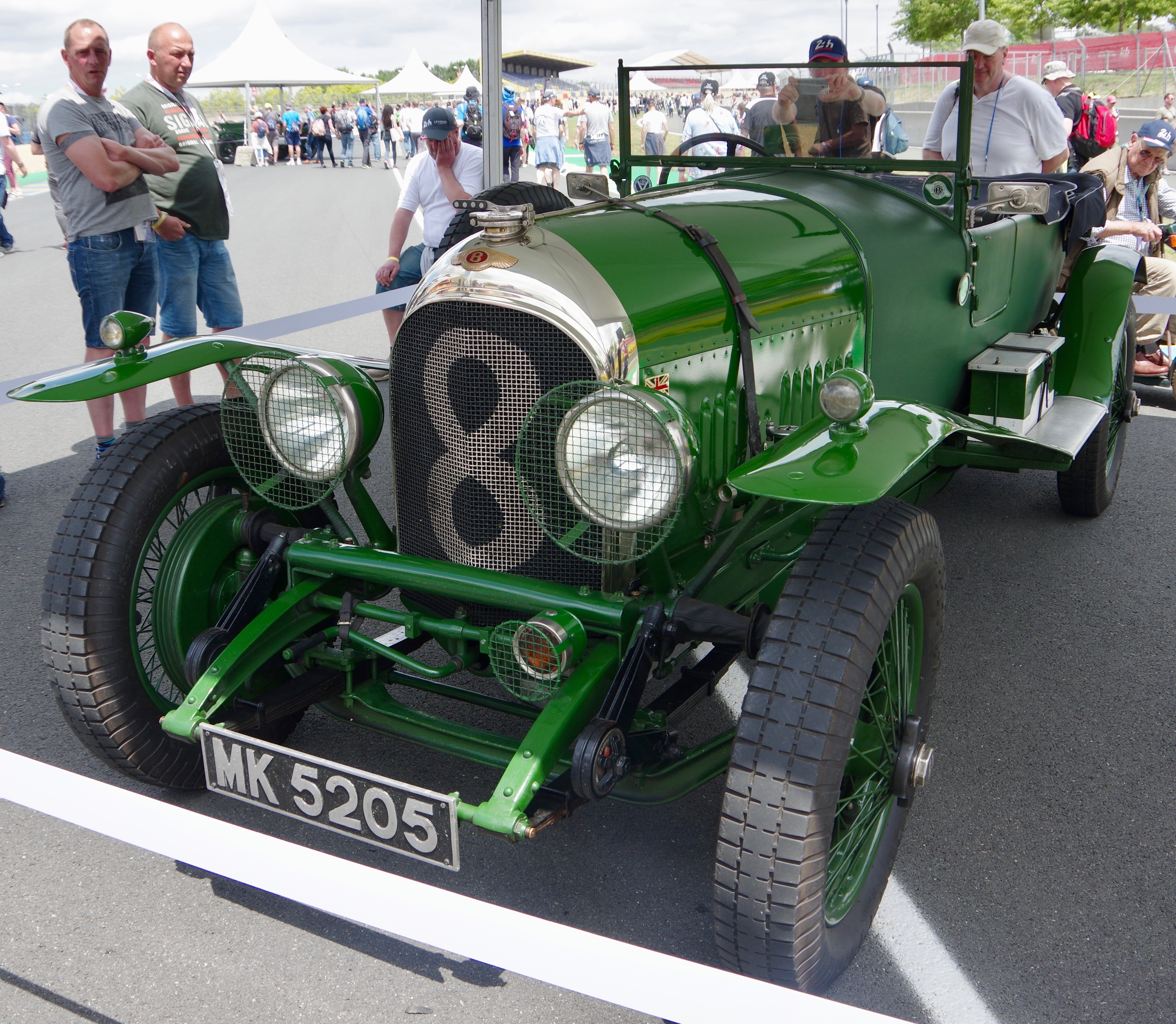
1926 Bentley 3 Litre Le Mans

In the 1920s, the cars used in endurance racing and Grand Prix were still basically identical, with fenders and two seats, to carry a mechanic if necessary or permitted. Cars such as the Bugatti Type 35 were almost equally at home in Grands Prix and endurance events, but specialisation gradually started to differentiate the sports-racer from the Grand Prix car. The legendary Alfa Romeo Tipo A Monoposto started the evolution of the true single-seater in the early 1930s; the Grand Prix racer and its miniature voiturette offspring rapidly evolved into high performance single seaters optimised for relatively short races, by dropping fenders and the second seat. During the later 1930s, French constructors, unable to keep up with the progress of the Mercedes-Benz and Auto-Union cars in GP racing, withdrew into primarily domestic competition with large-capacity sports cars – marques such as Delahaye, Talbot and the later Bugattis were locally prominent.

Similarly, through the 1920s and 1930s the road-going sports/GT car started to emerge as distinct from fast tourers (Le Mans had originally been a race for touring cars) and sports cars, whether descended from primarily road-going vehicles or developed from pure-bred racing cars came to dominate races such as Le Mans and the Mille Miglia.

In open-road endurance races across Europe such as the Mille Miglia, Tour de France and Targa Florio (the oldest sports car racing in the world), which were often run on dusty roads, the need for fenders and a mechanic or navigator was still there. As mainly Italian cars and races defined the genre, the category came to be known as Gran Turismo (particularly in the 1950s), as long distances had to be travelled, rather than running around on short circuits only. Reliability and some basic comfort were necessary in order to endure the task.

=== Post-war revival ===
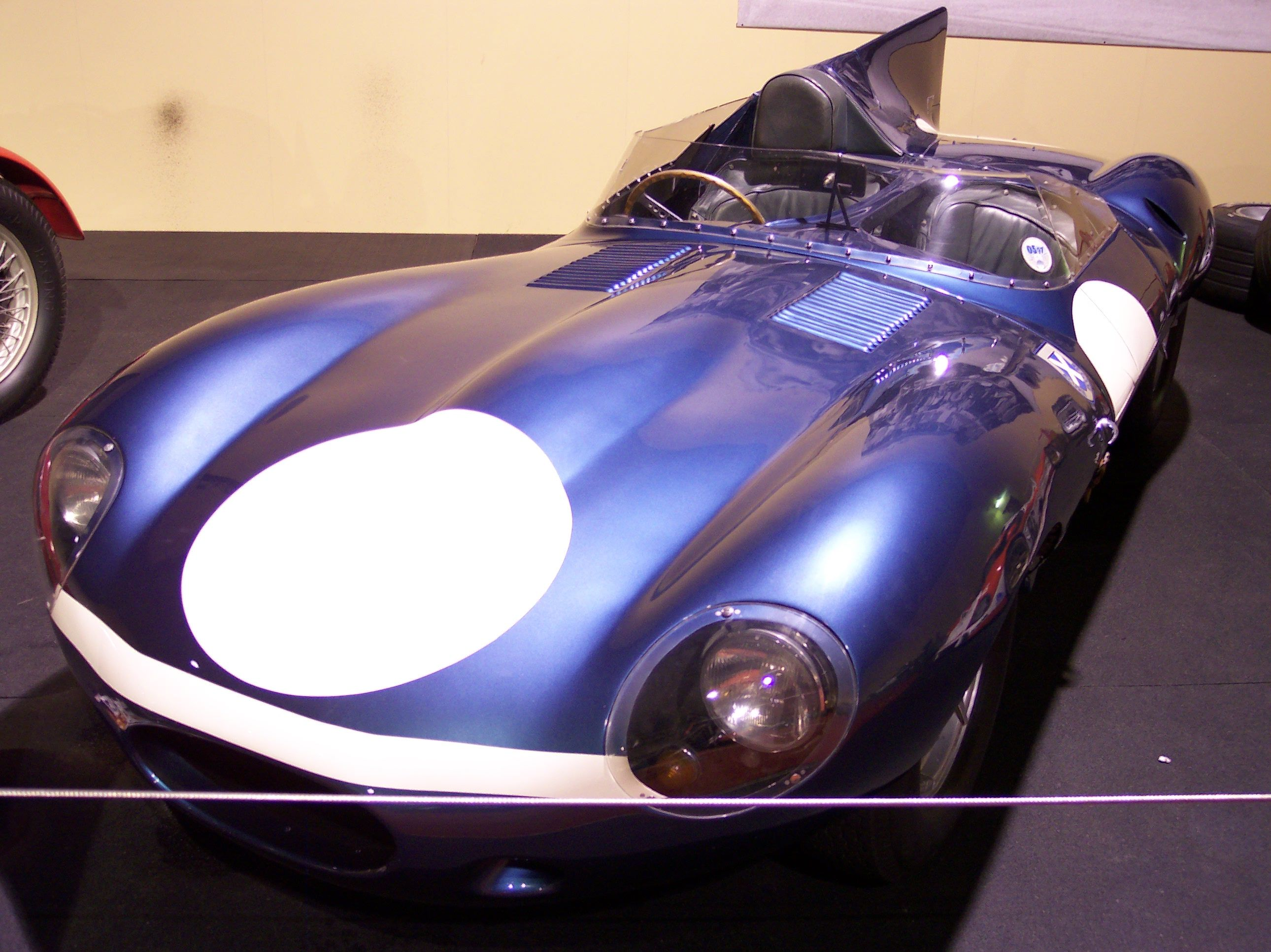
The 1957 24 Hours of Le Mans was won in a Jaguar XKD.

After the Second World War, sports car racing emerged as a distinct form of racing with its own classic races, and, from 1953, its own FIA sanctioned World Sportscar Championship. In the 1950s, sports car racing was regarded as almost as important as Grand Prix competition, with major marques like Ferrari, Maserati, Jaguar and Aston Martin investing much effort in their works programmes and supplying cars to customers; sports racers lost their close relationship to road-going sports cars in the 1950s and the major races were contested by dedicated competition cars such as the Jaguar C and D types, the Mercedes 300SLR, Maserati 300S, Aston Martin DBR1 and assorted Ferraris including the first Testa Rossas. Top Grand Prix drivers also competed regularly in sports car racing. After major accidents at the 1955 24 Hours of Le Mans and the 1957 Mille Miglia the power of sports cars was curbed with a 3-litre engine capacity limit applied to them in the World Championship from 1958. From 1962 sports cars temporarily took a back seat to GT cars with the FIA replacing the World Championship for Sports Cars with the International Championship for GT Manufacturers.

=== Growth at a national level ===
In national rather than international racing, sports car competition in the 1950s and early 1960s tended to reflect what was locally popular, with the cars that were successful locally often influencing each nation's approach to competing on the international stage.

In the US, imported Italian, German and British cars battled local hybrids, with initially very distinct East and West Coast scenes; these gradually converged and a number of classic races and important teams emerged including Camoradi, Briggs Cunningham and so on. The US scene tended to feature small MG and Porsche cars in the smaller classes, and imported Jaguar, Maserati, Mercedes-Benz, Allard and Ferrari cars in the larger classes.

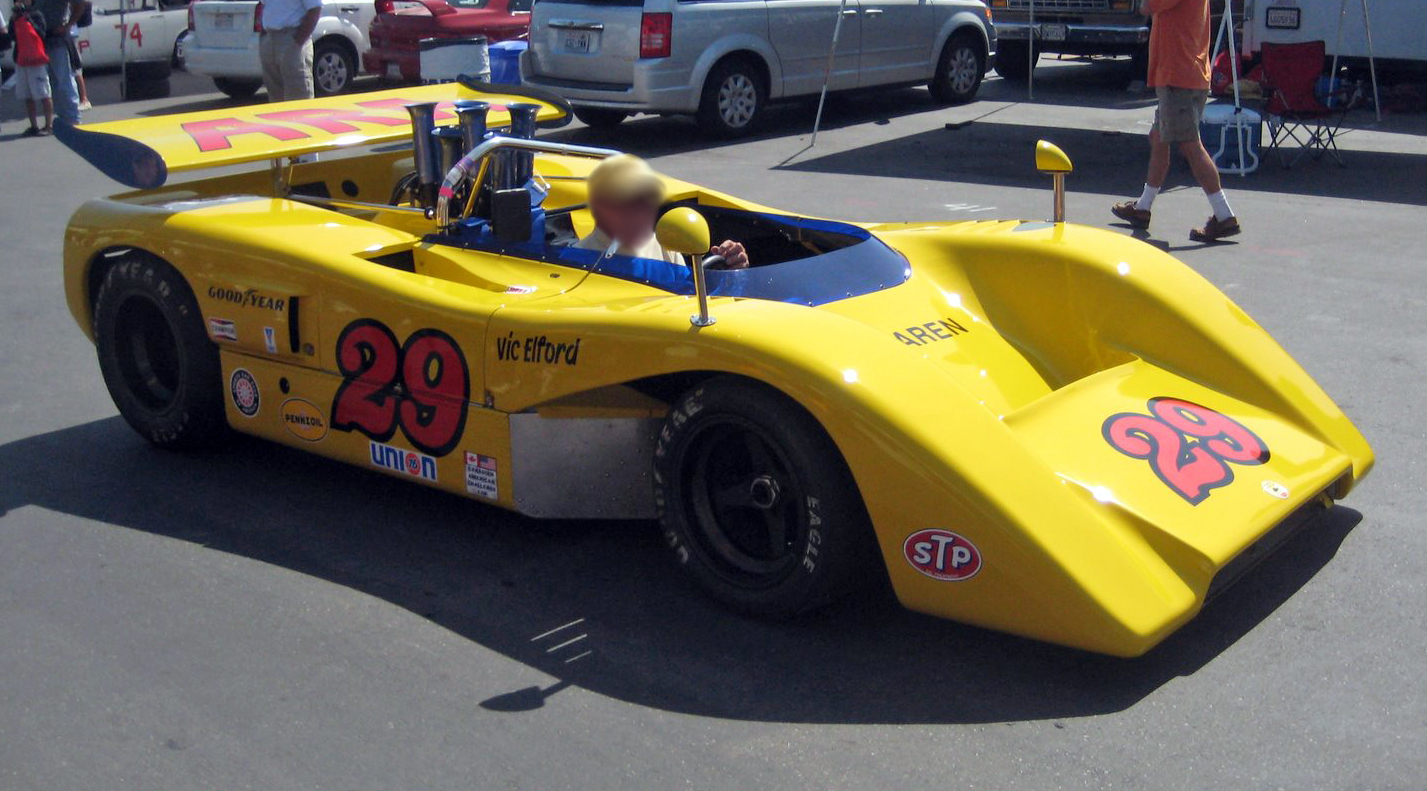
The McLaren M8E that was driven by Vic Elford in the 1971 Canadian-American Challenge Cup

A breed of powerful hybrids appeared in the 50s and 60s and raced on both sides of the Atlantic, featuring European chassis and large American engines – from the early Allard cars via hybrids such as Lotus 19s fitted with large engines through to the AC Cobra and De Tomaso Pantera. The combination of mostly British or Italian chassis and American V8 engines gave rise to the popular and spectacular Can-Am series in the 1960s and 1970s.

In Britain 2-litre sports cars were initially popular (the Bristol engine being readily available and cheap), subsequently 1100 cc sports racers became a very popular category for young drivers (effectively supplanting 500 cc F3), with Lola, Lotus, Cooper and others being very competitive, although at the other end of the scale in the early to mid-1960s the national sports racing scene also attracted sophisticated GTs and later a crop of large-engined "big bangers" the technology of which largely gave rise to Can-Am but soon died out. Clubmans provided much entertainment at club-racing level from the 1960s into the 1990s and John Webb revived interest in big sports prototypes with Thundersports in the 1980s. There was even enough interest in Group C to sustain a C2 championship for a few years; at 'club' level Modified Sports Car ("ModSports") and Production Sports Car ("ProdSports") races remained a feature of most British race meetings into the 1980s, evolving into a "Special GT" series that was essentially Formula Libre for sports or saloon cars. After a relative period of decline in the 1980s a British GT Championship emerged in the mid-90s.

Italy found itself with both grassroots racing with a plethora of Fiat based specials (often termed "etceterinis") and small Alfa Romeos, and exotica such as Maserati and Ferrari – who also sold cars to domestic customers as well as racing on the world stage. Road races such as the Mille Miglia included everything from stock touring cars to World Championship contenders. The Mille Miglia was the largest sporting event in Italy until a fatal accident caused its demise in 1957. The Targa Florio on the island of Sicily, another tough road race, remained part of the world championship until the 1973 and remained as a local race for a few years afterwards.

As the French car industry switched from making large powerful cars to small utilitarian ones, French sports cars of the 1950s and early 1960s tended to be small-capacity and highly aerodynamic (often based on Panhard or Renault Gordini/Alpine components), aimed at winning the "Index of Performance" at Le Mans and Reims and triumphing in handicap races. Between the late 1960s and late 1970s, Matra and Renault made significant and successful efforts to win Le Mans overall, while also tackling Formula One. An event less known than the 24 Hours was the Tour de France Automobile, held in stages all across the country similar to the bicycle race. It even featured pure-bred Le Mans prototypes competing on public roads with two persons on board.

In Germany, domestic production based sports racing is since the 1950s largely dominated by Porsche, plus BMW and Mercedes-Benz, although sports car/GT racing gradually became eclipsed by touring cars and the initially sports car based Deutsche Rennsport Meisterschaft gradually evolved into the Deutsche Tourenwagen Meisterschaft. Porsche started to evolve a line of sports prototypes from the 1953 1500cc flat-4 Porsche 550; noted for their toughness and reliability they started to win in races of attrition such as the Targa Florio and 12 Hours of Sebring. They grew slightly bigger to 2000cc flat-6 up to the 1967 Porsche 910, which still was an underdog compared to the 4 liter V12 Ferrari P and 7 liter V8 Ford GT40. From 1968, Porsche entered the biggest classes, with the 3 liter prototype Porsche 908 and finally the 5 liter sportscar Porsche 917, and the Stuttgart marque became first a competitor for overall wins and then came to dominate sports car racing – both they and Mercedes have made intermittent returns to the top level of the sport through the 1970s, 80s, 90s and 2010s. The long Nordschleife of the Nürburgring, opened in 1927 and used for testing by German manufacturers ever since, is since the 2000s also visited by brands from other continents trying to top the List of Nürburgring lap times.

Sports car racing has intermittently been popular in Japan – in the 1960s small-capacity sports racers and even a local version of the Group 7 cars as raced in the Canadian-American Challenge Cup were popular; a healthy local sports prototype championship ran until the early 1990s and now the Super GT series provides high-budget exposure to manufacturers, with many international drivers appearing. The Japanese manufacturers have also been frequent visitors to the US sports car scene (Nissan and Toyota in particular during the heyday of IMSA) and to the European scene, in particular Le Mans, where despite many years of trying by all the main Japanese marques the only victory to have been scored by a Japanese marque was by Mazda in 1991, until 2018 when Toyota scored a first and second-place finish. Toyota followed this with another 1-2 finish in 2019.

=== 1960s and 1970s – Evolution, rise, and decline ===
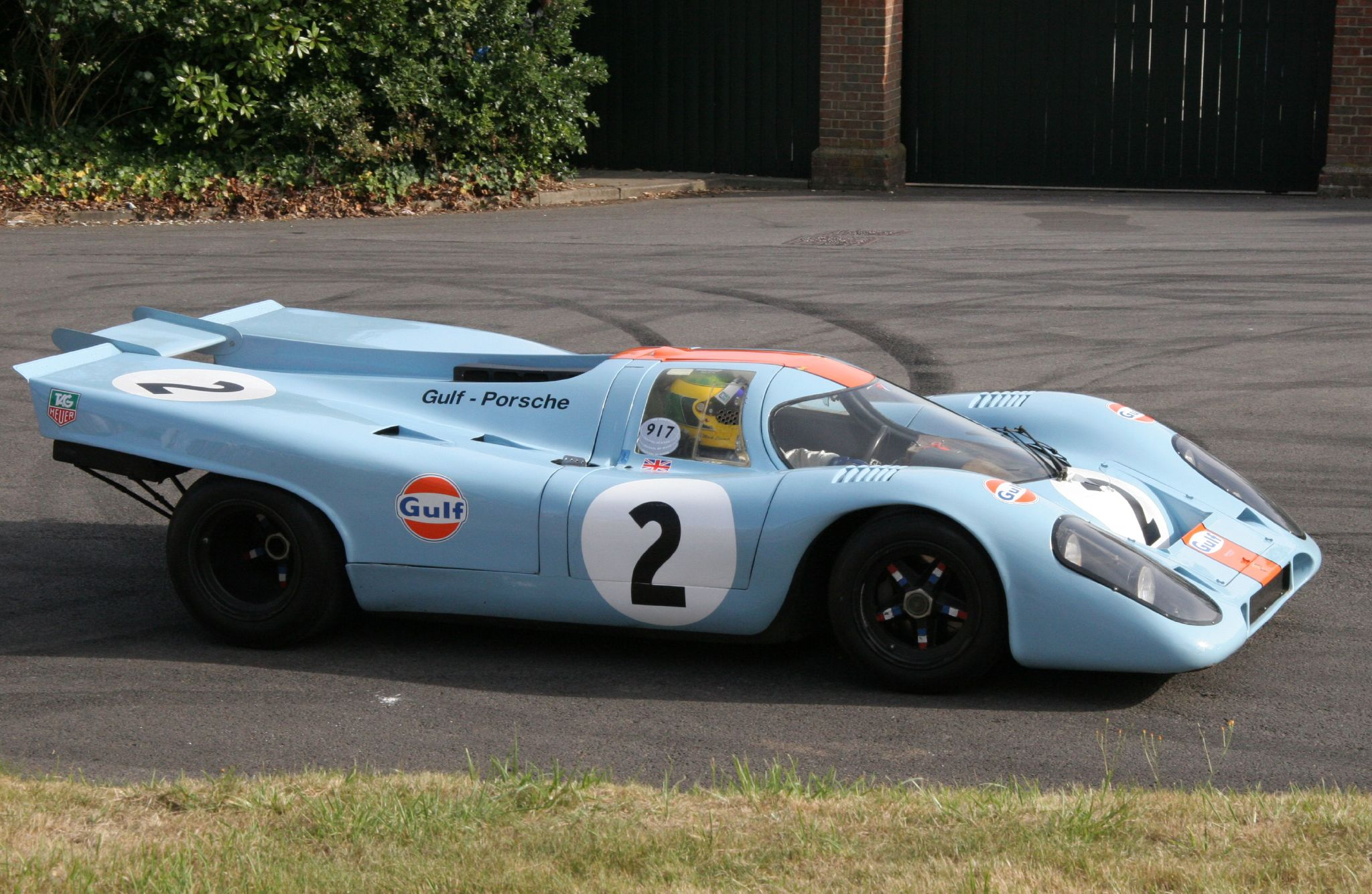
An iconic 1970 Porsche 917 at the 2006 Goodwood Festival of Speed

Powerful prototypes (effectively pure-bred two-seater racing cars with no real link to production vehicles) started to appear as the 1960s progressed, with worldwide battles between Ferrari, Ford, Porsche, Lotus, Alfa Romeo and Matra as well as other more specialist marques running on into the early 1970s. The competition at Le Mans even made it to the movie screens, with Steve McQueen's film Le Mans. This era was seen by many as the highpoint of sports car racing, with the technology and performance of the cars comfortably in excess of what was seen in Formula 1. Homologation saw many out-and-out racing cars produced in sufficient quantities to see them classed as production vehicles; the FIA responded by placing more restrictions on even the allegedly production-based cars and placed draconian limits on the power available to prototypes – these prototypes of the late 1960s/early 1970s were comfortably quicker than contemporary Grand Prix machinery and for 1972 they were constrained to run much smaller engines to F1 rules, often de-tuned for endurance. Group 4 Grand Touring Cars and Group 5 Special Production Cars became the premier form of "sports car" racing from 1976, with prototypes going into a general decline apart from Porsche 936 domination at Le Mans and a lower-key series of races for smaller two-litre Group 6 prototypes.

A peculiarly American form of sports car racing was the Can-Am series, in which virtually unlimited sports prototypes competed in relatively short races. This series ran from 1966 to 1974 and was an expansion of the USRRC that conformed to FIA Group 7 rules. The original Can-Am fell victim to rising costs and the energy crisis.

The ACO, organisers of the Le Mans 24 Hours, attempted to come up with a formula that would encourage more prototypes back to the race but would also be relatively economical – their Grand Touring Prototype rules in the late 1970s, based on fuel consumption rules, gave rise to two different varieties of sports car racing that were widely held to be a high point in the history of the sport.

=== 1980s – Group C and IMSA GTP ===
In Europe, the FIA adopted the ACO GTP rules virtually unchanged and sanctioned the Group C World Endurance Championship (or World Sportscar Championship), featuring high-tech closed-cockpit prototypes from Porsche, Aston Martin, Mercedes-Benz, Nissan, Jaguar and others. In the US, the IMSA Camel GTP series boasted close competition between huge fields of manufacturer-backed teams and privateer squads – the cars were technically similar to Group Cs but used a sliding scale of weights and engine capacities to try to limit performance. Both Group C and GTP had secondary categories, respectively Group C2 and Camel Lights, for less powerful cars, targeting entries by small specialist constructors or serious amateur teams.

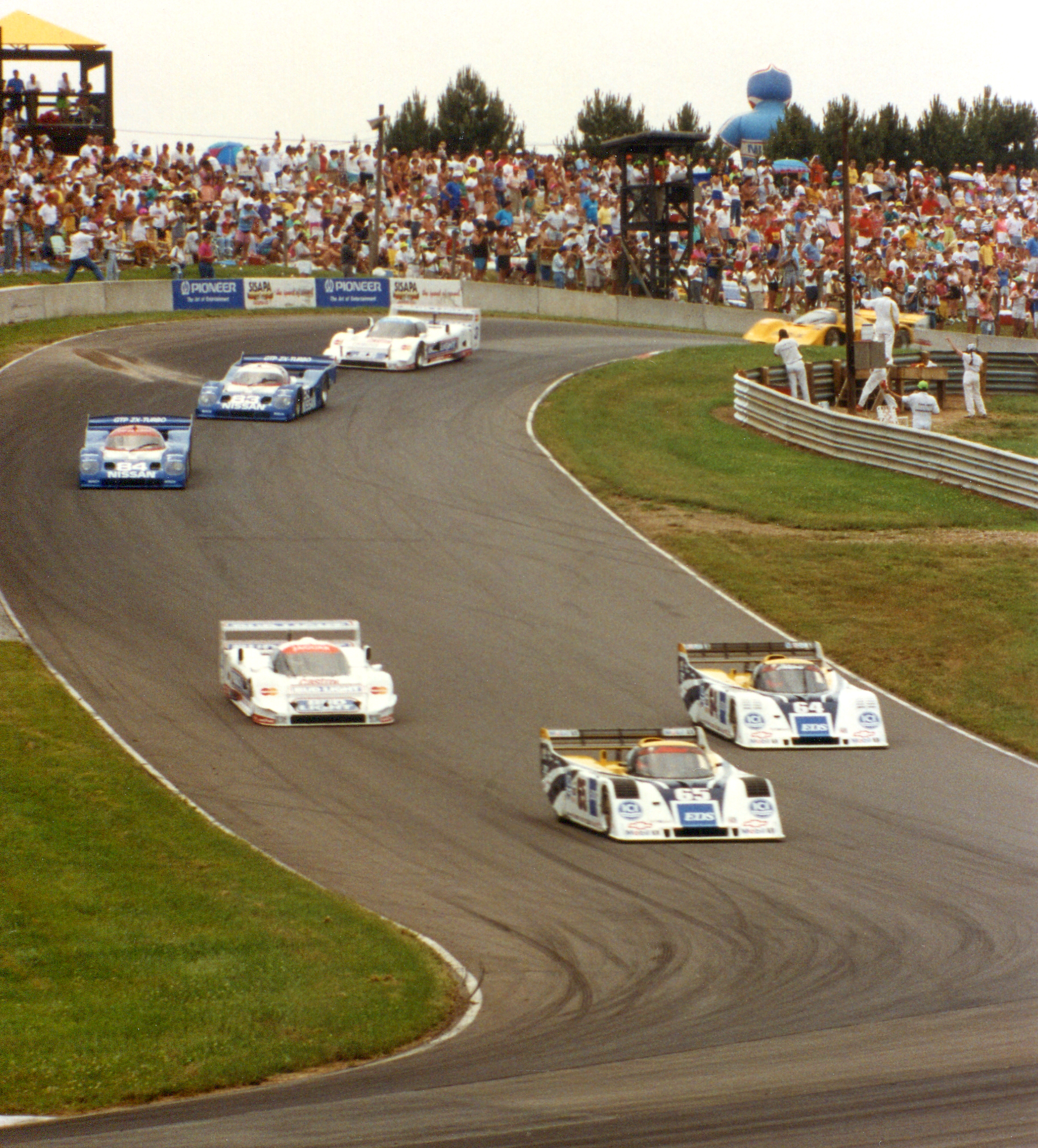
1991 IMSA GTP

The FIA attempted to make Group C into a virtual "two seater Grand Prix" format in the early 1990s, with engine rules in common with F1, short race distances, and a schedule dovetailing with that of the F1 rounds. This drove up costs and drove away entrants and crowds, and by 1993 prototype racing was dead in Europe, with the Peugeot, Jaguar, Toyota and Mercedes-Benz teams all having withdrawn.

=== 1990s – Rebirth and revival ===
In an attempt to provide a top-class endurance racing series to replace the WSPC, a number of GT series sprung up at national and European level, with the BPR series eventually evolving into the FIA GT Championship. IMSA GTP continued for a few more years but was replaced by a series for World Sports Cars – relatively simple open-top prototypes – which gave rise to cars such as the Ferrari 333SP and the Riley & Scott Mk 3, supported by GTs. As the 1990s progressed, these prototypes and others like them started to be raced in Europe and an FIA Sports Car series evolved for them.

Since the demise of Group C (where Japan and Germany both had successful series of their own) Japan has largely gone its own way in sports car racing; the Super GT series is for very highly modified production-based cars; although prototypes are slowly returning to Japanese racing in the Japan Le Mans Challenge many of these 'prototypes' are little more than rebodied Formula 3 cars (although there has been a long Japanese tradition of such hybrids; a Grand Champion series ran for many years with rebodied Formula 2 and Formula 3000 cars, rather similar to the second incarnation of Can-Am).

In the US, however, road racing actually saw a decline. The IMSA GT Championship had been prototype-based since 1983, with less emphasis on production cars. NASCAR was becoming increasingly dominant, and the IndyCar Series' split from CART in 1996 put more emphasis on ovals regarding domestic open-wheel racing. Also contributing to the decline was the retirement of Mario Andretti from Formula One. It would be over a decade before another American driver would join Formula One, viz. Scott Speed, although Speed was ultimately unsuccessful and eventually joined NASCAR himself.

=== 2000s – Resurgence in the US ===
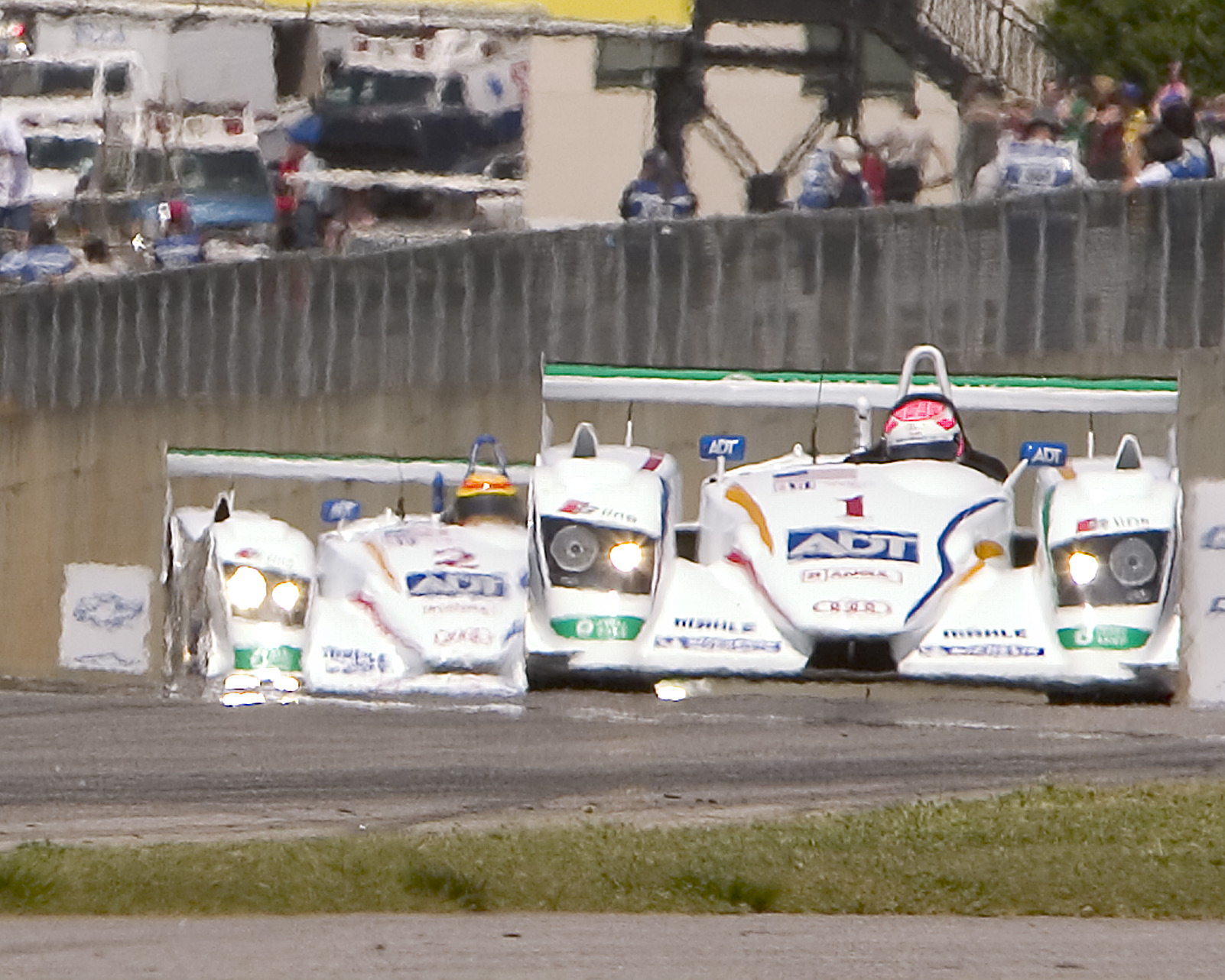
2005 Grand Prix of Atlanta

The debut of the SpeedVision television network brought a resurgence of interest in sports car racing in the US, with the network originally showing a large amount of sports car racing and sports car–related programming before being replaced by Fox Sports.

The IMSA GT Series evolved into the American Le Mans Series; the European races eventually became the closely related Le Mans Series, both of which mix prototypes and GTs; the FIA remains more interested in its own GT and GT3 championships, with the ACO's rules the basis for the LMS and ALMS. The Le Mans Prototype is somewhat reminiscent of the old Can Am prototype.

Further splits in the American scene saw the Grand American Road Racing Association form a separate series, the Rolex Sports Car Series, with its own GT and prototype rules aimed at providing cheaper, lower-cost racing for independent teams. Grand Am's Continental Tire Sports Car Challenge, a support series for the Rolex Series, provides a similar series to the old Trans Am Series, mixing conventional sports cars and touring cars. Due to Grand Am's affiliation with NASCAR, many NASCAR drivers occasionally participate in the Rolex Sports Car Series. Max Papis is a notable example in that he was a road racer prior to his tenure in the Sprint Cup Series. Many of these drivers only participate in the 24 Hours of Daytona.

The original Trans-Am Series dissolved in 2006, but returned to action in 2009 with tube frame TA1 and TA2 divisions racing with production-based TA3-American and TA3-International divisions. In addition, the SCCA continues to provide a major support series for Trans-Am. This series, known as the SCCA World Challenge, consists of a one-hour race for each round, combining three classes: GT (Chevrolet Corvette, Aston Martin DB9, etc.), "GTS" (Acura TSX, BMW 3 Series, etc.; replaced the former touring car class), and Touring Car (a "showroom stock" class similar to Grand Am's Continental Challenge). The Trans Am series returned in 2009, but has yet to establish a television contract.

=== 2010s – Reformatting ===
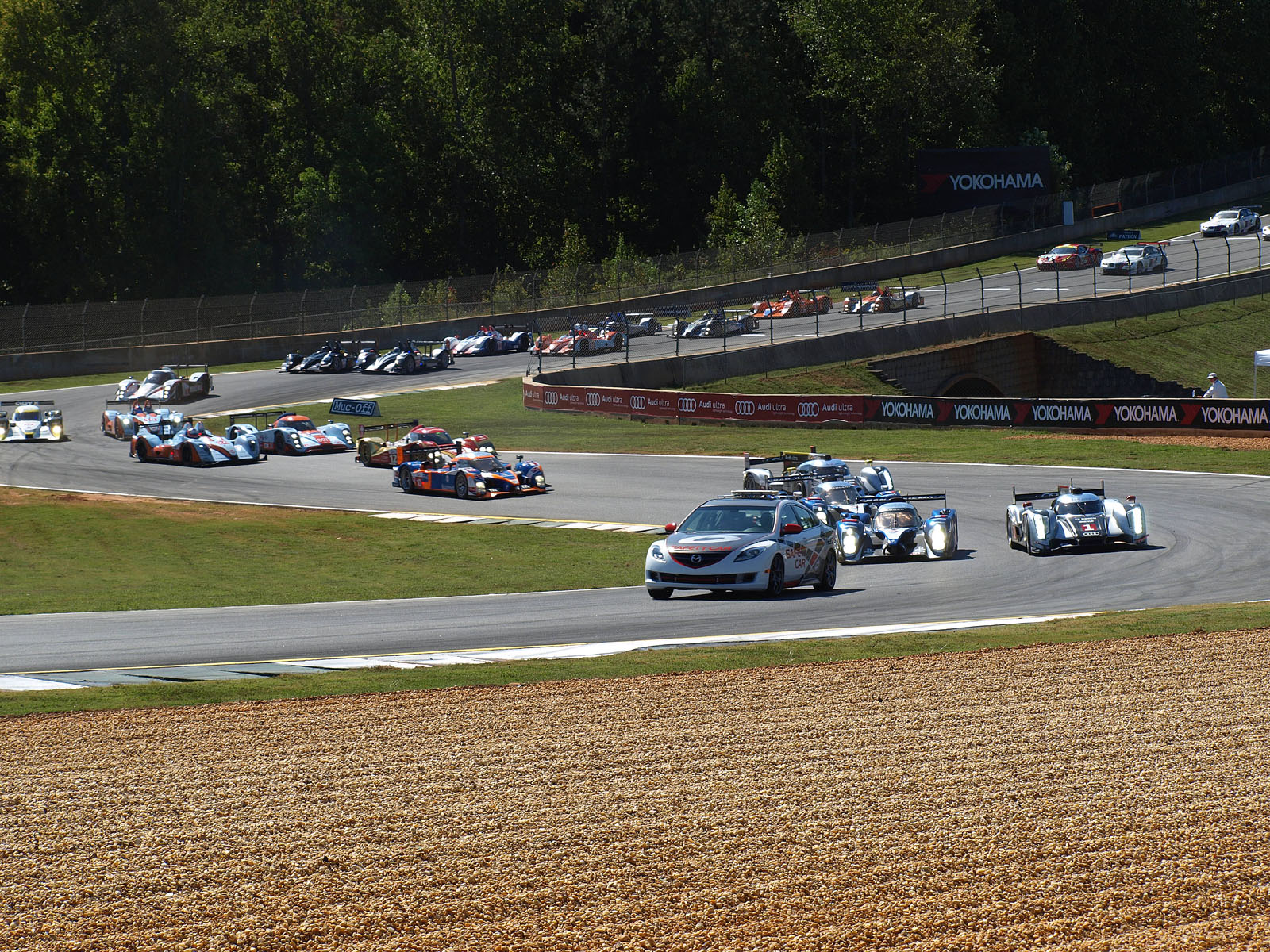
2011 Petit Le Mans

The 2010s have seen a major overhaul of sports car racing in the United States. The Pirelli World Challenge reformatted in 2010 to have a showroom stock touring car group comparable to that of the Continental Challenge's Grand Sport class, promoting its other touring car class to "GTS". This came after several years of the old TC class being an Acura-BMW-Mazda affair. For 2012, the series adopted a "B-spec" touring car class comparable to that of the Continental Challenge's Street Tuner class.

2010 also saw the introduction of the Intercontinental Le Mans Cup (ILMC) by the ACO, featuring events in America, Asia and Europe. This in turn led the ACO & FIA to come together to create the FIA World Endurance Championship (WEC) starting in 2012. This new series replaced the ILMC and was a spiritual successor to the former FIA World Sportscar Championship.

In 2012, the Rolex Sports Car Series overhauled its Daytona Prototype class, allowing for production-based designs.

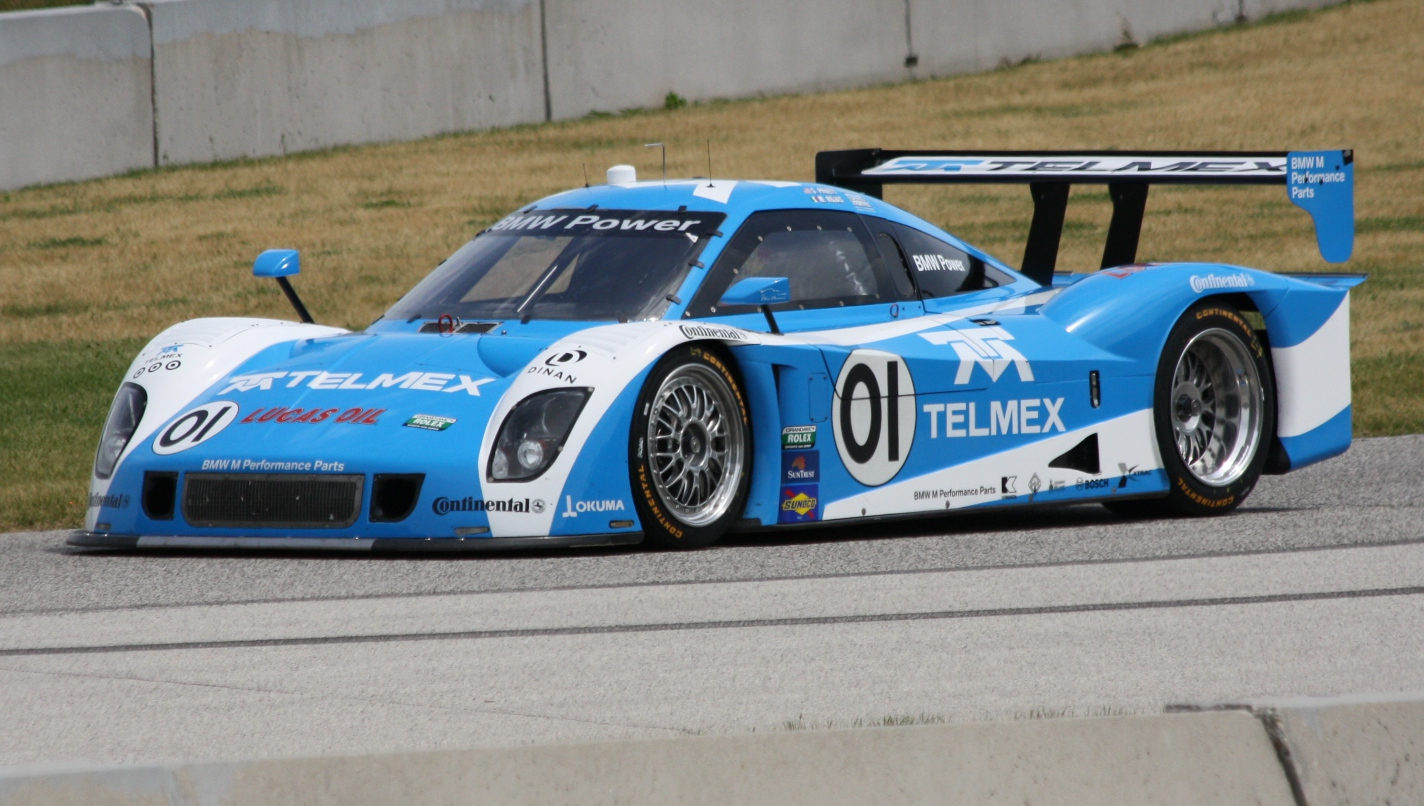
The Scott Pruett / Memo Rojas BMW Riley of Chip Ganassi Racing at Road America during a 2012 Rolex Sports Car Series race

The ALMS's new LMP/LMC format, however, did not hold up. The prototype classes split again in 2011, with LMP1 having three cars and LMP2 having one. A new "GT Pro Am" class was added. Initially, this format was only to be used in endurance races, but was eventually applied to all races. For 2012, only a handful of LMPs were entered, with almost all of them being powered by Japanese manufacturers (Nissan, Honda, etc.). The British manufacturer Morgan entered a Nissan-powered LMP2 for Conquest Endurance.

The reformatted Trans-Am Series remained stagnant, being heavily overshadowed by the SCCA's World Challenge, and failing to garner a television contract. A major factor in this is the fact that Trans Am's teams still use vehicles dating back to 1999. In most other series, teams tended to update their vehicles every few years or so (examples include the 2005 vs. 2010 Mustangs in the Continental Challenge and the two different generations of Mazda RX-8 in the Rolex Series).

Other television changes include Speed Channel losing the rights to almost every series. The World Challenge was transferred to Versus, while the ALMS was transferred to an ESPN/ABC partnership. ALMS races were shown live online with a telecast the following day (although Speed still has the rights to the 24 Hours of Le Mans, which is still televised live). Speed, having a partnership with NASCAR, still has exclusive rights to the NASCAR-owned Grand Am series.

The ALMS introduced "GTE-PRO" and "GTE-AM" for endurance races.

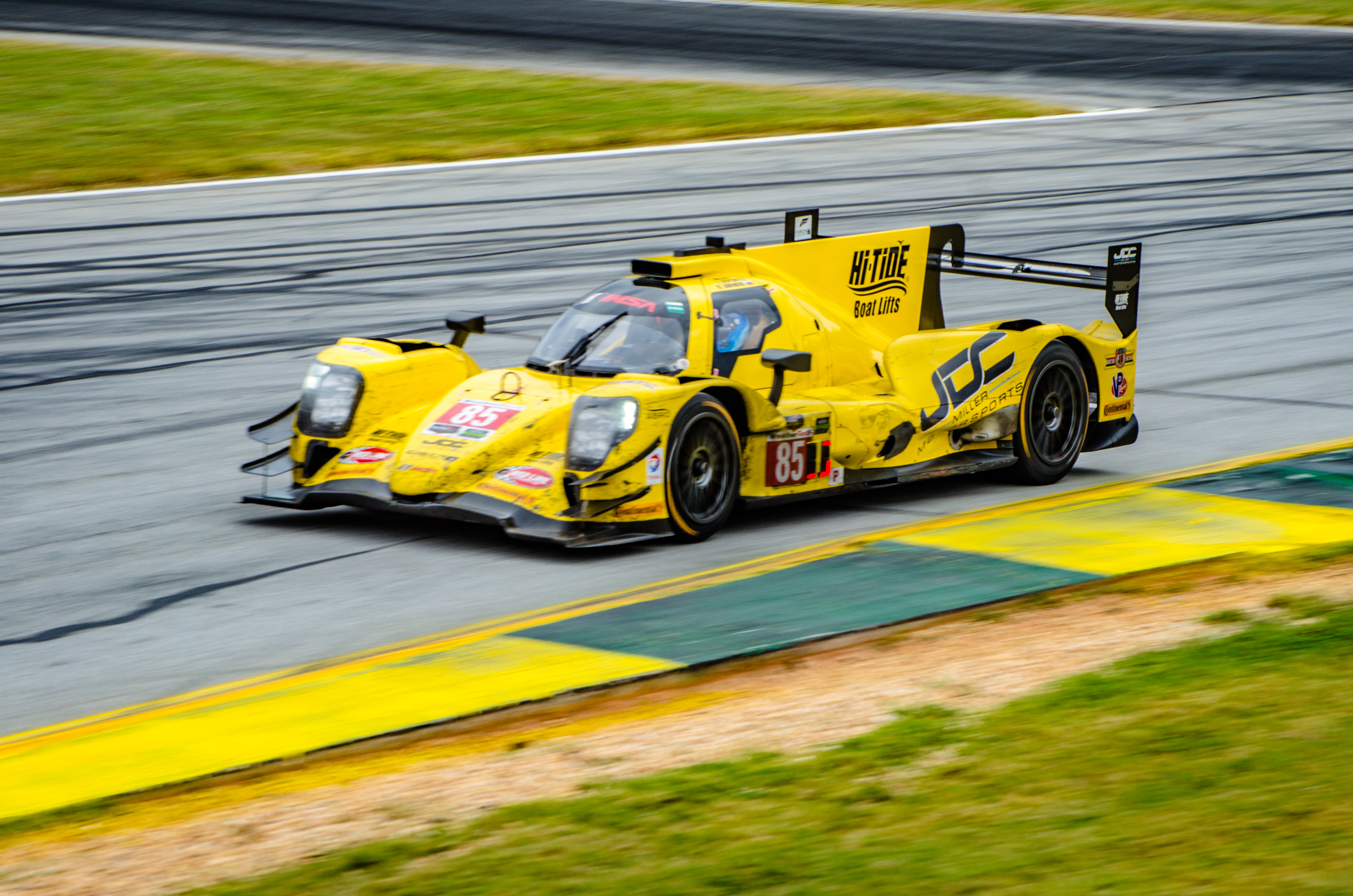
Oreca 07 of JDC-Miller Motorsports in 2017 Petit Le Mans

In 2014, American Le Mans Series and Rolex Sports Car Series were merged into United SportsCar Championship, with IMSA as its sanctioning body. Fox Sports 1 (successor of Speed Channel) was returned as main broadcaster of the unified series.

Daytona Prototype was replaced in 2017 by Daytona Prototype International (DPi), which based on the four ACO homologated LMP2 chassis made by Dallara, Onroak (Ligier), Oreca, and Riley-Multimatic, with brand bodywork and homologated engines. Manufacturers are asked to partner with a privateer team, and each car will sport manufacturer bodywork, corresponding to their brand-identity. These rules are made to both control costs and attract manufacturers to the series.

In 2018, SRO Motorsports Group has taken over the management of Pirelli World Challenge, with USAC as its sanctioning body since 2017.

Beginning in 2019, NBC Sports will be replacing Fox Sports as main broadcaster of WeatherTech SportsCar Championship with six-year broadcasting rights.

== Types of cars ==
There are many kinds of sports cars that compete, but they can be broadly broken down into two main categories: Sports prototypes and Grand Touring (GT) cars. These two categories (or "classes") are often mixed together in a single race, such as in the 24 Hours of Le Mans. In mixed-class races, an overall winner is awarded, though individual class winners are often recognised as well.

=== Sports prototype ===
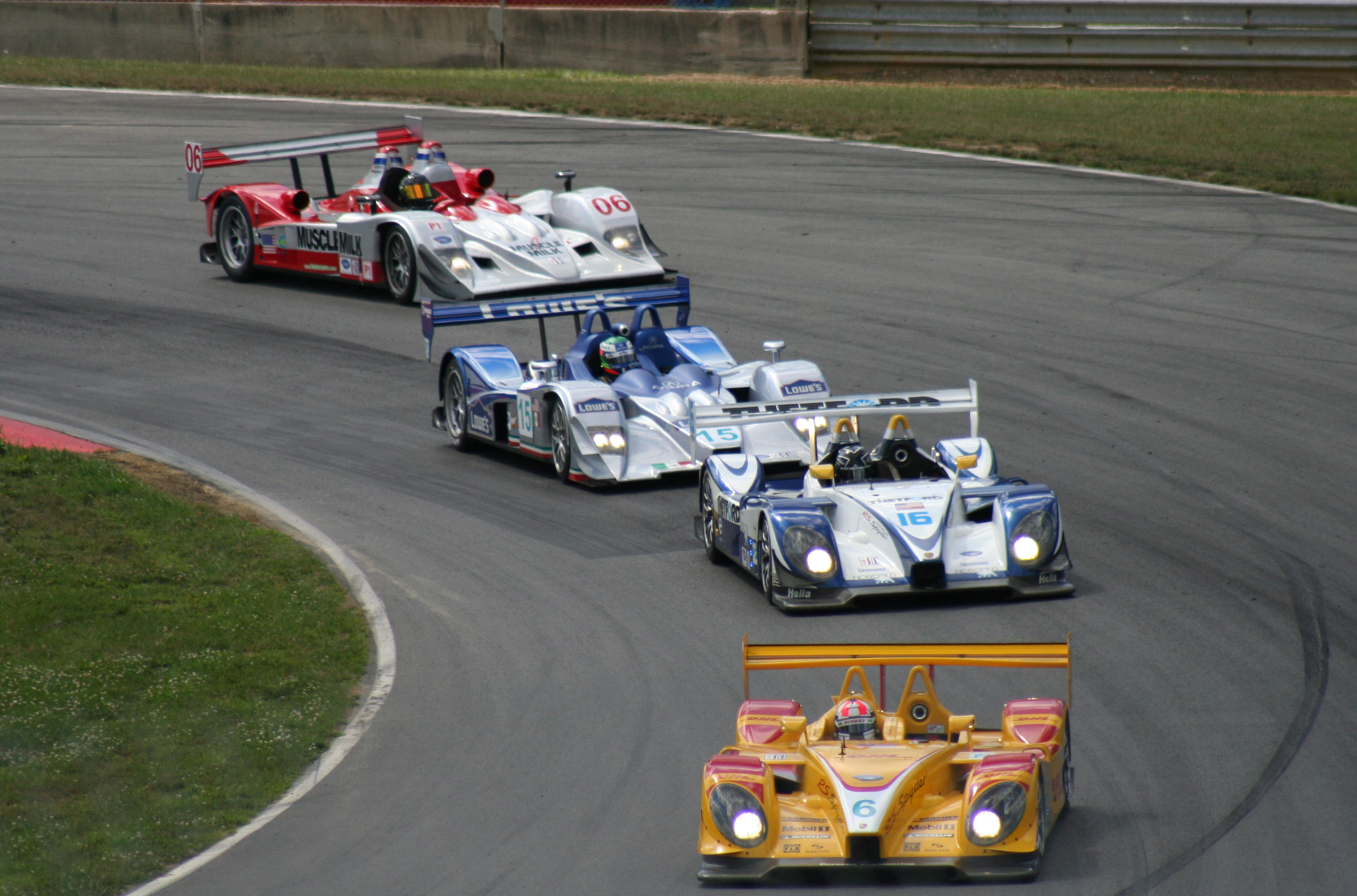
A group of modern Le Mans Prototypes competing in the American Le Mans Series

Sports prototype is the name given to a type of car used in sports car racing and is effectively the next automotive design and technological step-up from road-going sports cars and are, along with open-wheel cars, the pinnacle of racing car design.

The highest level in sports car racing, these cars are purpose-built racing cars with enclosed wheels, and either open or closed cockpits. Ever since the World Sportscar Championship was conceived, there have been various regulations regarding bodywork, engine style and size, tyres and aerodynamics to which these cars must be built. Sports prototypes may be (and often are) one-of-a-kind machines, and need bear no relation to any road-going vehicle, although during the 1990s, some manufacturers exploited a loophole in the FIA and ACO rules. As a result, some cars racing in the GT category did pass as true sports prototypes, in turn leading to some road-going versions for homologation purposes. The Dauer-Porsche 962LM, Porsche 911 GT1-98, Mercedes CLK-GTR and Toyota GT-One were prime examples of prototypes masquerading as GTs.

In simplistic terms, sports prototypes are two-seat racing cars with bodywork covering their wheels, and are as technically advanced and, depending on the regulations they are built to, as quick as or quicker than their single-seat counterparts. Although not widely known, sports-prototypes (along with Formula 1 cars) are responsible for introducing the most numbers of new technologies and ideas to motorsport, including rear-wings, ground effect 'venturi' tunnels, fan-assisted aerodynamics and dual-shift gearboxes. Some of these technologies eventually filter down to road cars.

In the ACO regulations, two categories of sports prototypes are now recognised: P1 and P2. Cars competing in the P1 category must weigh no less than 900 kg and are limited to 6000 cc naturally aspirated and 4000 cc turbocharged engines. 5500 cc turbo-Diesel engines are also permitted in P1 – Audi scored Le Mans victories with such a car in 2006, 2007 and 2008 and Peugeot returned to racing in 2007 with a car with a similar powerplant (Peugeot 908). P2 cars can weigh much less — first 675 kg, then 750 kg and now 825 kg — but are restricted to 3400 cc V6 or V8 normally aspirated or 2000 cc turbocharged powerplants. In the European series in which endurance is a priority and P2s have been run largely by privateers, P2s have not challenged P1s for outright victories; in the American Le Mans Series with generally shorter races P2 has become the most active prototype category with serious involvement from Porsche and Acura and whereas P2 in Europe tends to involve races of attrition, in the US series the P2s, particularly the Porsche RS Spyder are often quicker round a lap than P1s, with the Porsche having scored many overall victories against the Audis in P1.

Prototype rules for 2010 and beyond will encourage production-based engines (GT1 engines in LMP1, GT2 engines in LMP2) and rules to equalise the performance of petrol and diesel LMP1s are also being addressed.

Daytona Prototypes are a product of the Grand-Am Rolex Sports Car Series, and offer a different interpretation of the prototype theme. DPs, as they are often called, are closed-cockpit, purpose-built racing machines which are less expensive and (deliberately) somewhat slower than Le Mans Prototypes, which were becoming dangerously quick on the Daytona oval and prohibitively expensive for smaller teams to run. Compared to the LMPs, DPs are severely limited in terms of approved technology; for instance, they are required to be constructed of steel tube frames with carbon-fibre skins, rather than being carbon-fibre monocoques, and must use production-based engines. In addition, contrary to their European counterparts who continuously alter and develop a vehicle to increase performance as a season progresses, DPs are restricted to their original conception of the car from the start of the season. For these reasons, the category being labeled as a "prototype" has occasionally been criticised as misleading and being more in line with traditional "spec" race series prevalent in the United States. The intention of the DP formula was to provide a class in which tight technical regulations encouraged close competition and where budget would be relatively unimportant. DP chassis are subject to a franchise-like approval system in which only approved constructors are eligible, with rules stability enforced for several years at a time, although this led in 2007 to established constructors like Lola and Dallara entering the 2008 series by taking over the rights of existing constructors (Multimatic and Doran respectively).

=== Grand Touring car ===
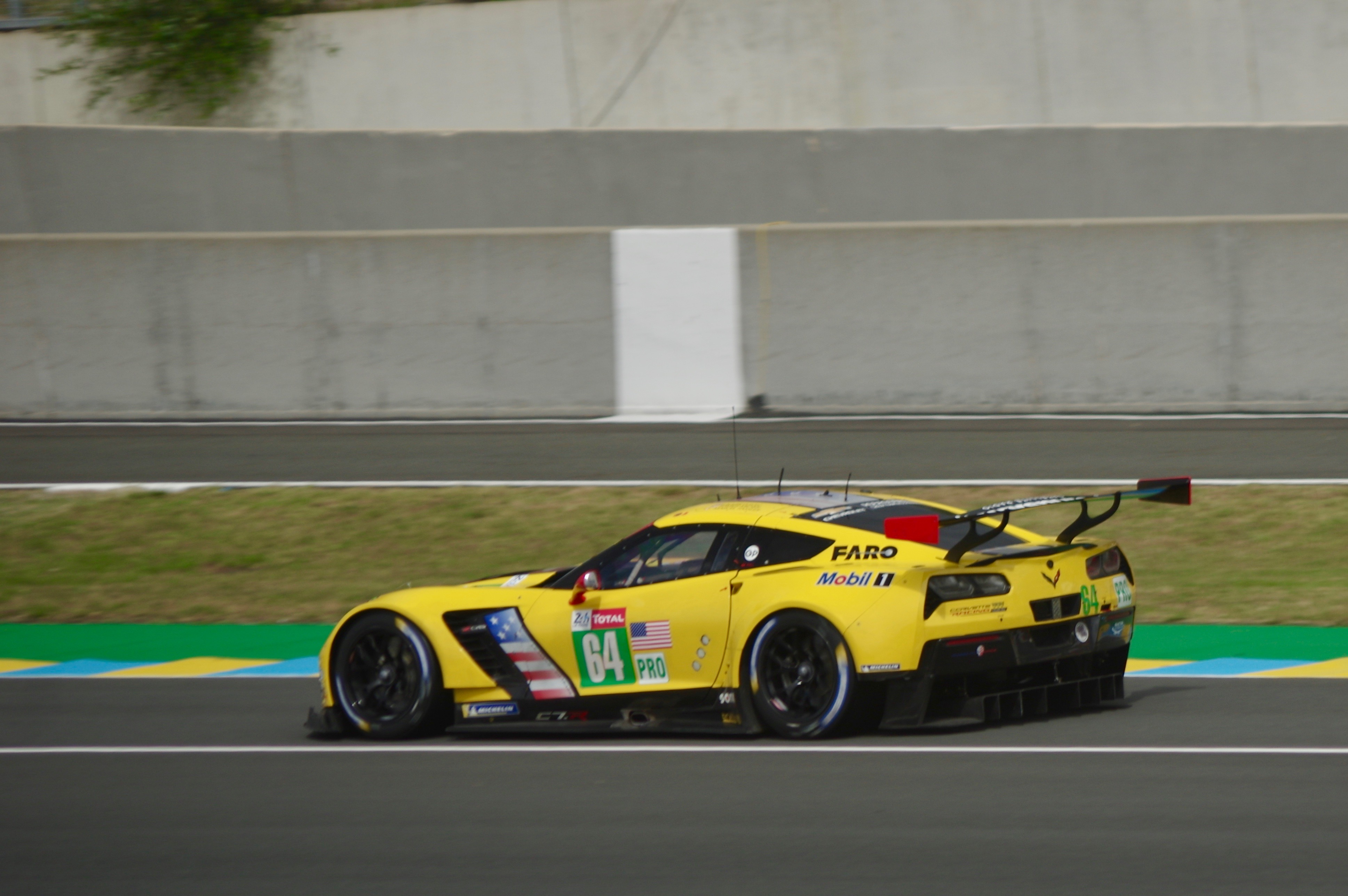
No. 64 Chevrolet Corvette C7.R car running at the 2019 24 Hours of Le Mans

Grand Touring (from the Italian Gran Turismo) racing is the most common form of sports car racing, and is found all over the world, in both international and national series. Historically, Grand Touring cars had to be in series production, but in 1976 the class was split into production-based Group 4 Grand Touring Cars and Group 5 Special Production Cars, the latter of which were essentially pure-bred racing cars with production-lookalike bodies. GT racing gradually fell into abeyance in Europe in the 1980s and 1990s, with silhouette cars continuing to race in IMSA races in the USA. When GT racing revived after the collapse of the World Sports Car Championship at the end of 1992, the lead in defining rules was taken by the ACO. Under the ACO rules, Grand Touring cars are divided into two categories, Grand Touring 1 (GT1, formerly GT) and Grand Touring 2 (GT2, formerly N-GT). As the name of the class implies, the exterior of the car closely resembles that of the production version, while the internal fittings may differ greatly. GT2 cars are very similar to the FIA GT2 classification, and are considered 'pure' GT cars; that is production exotic cars with relatively few internal modifications for racing. The Porsche 911 is currently the most popular car in the GT2 class. 2009 was the last run of the GT1 class as a result of budgeting issues. GT1 teams are currently enlisting to run their cars in the GT2 class next year. The American Le Mans Series also runs a "GT-Challenge" class, which currently only uses Porsche 911 GT3 Cups but will open to other cars next year. This category is designed for privateer and rookie teams as an easier way to enter the series.

For 2011, the ACO split GT2 into two categories, GTE-Pro (for all-professional teams with current-spec cars) and GTE-Am (for teams with one amateur and one professional per car using previous-spec cars), as a way to entice rookies to enter one of the three Le Mans Series.

FIA divides GT cars into four categories called GT1 (formerly GT), GT2 (formerly N-GT), GT3 (recently introduced) and GT4. The GT1 and GT2 divisions are very close to the ACO rules outlined above, and again some crossover racing does occur, particularly in the GT2 class. The GT3 class is relatively new and was introduced for 2006. These cars are closer to standard form than in GT2, and in most cases modifications are restricted to those found in one-make cups. GT4 is another new category for amateur and semi-pro drivers in production-based cars with very few racing modifications – for example, no aerodynamic aids or body modifications are permitted. All of the categories (with the exception of GT2) have their own championships/cups run by the FIA. Currently, GT2 is defunct in the FIA, and only runs in Le Mans Series/ALMS; however, the FIA has also announced that GT2 cars will be able to compete in the FIA GT1 World Championship in 2012 in a World Class along with GT3 cars.

Grand-Am has only one class for Grand Touring cars which allows production-based GT racers at a spec somewhere between FIA GT2 and GT3 in terms of modification (e.g. the Porsche 911 GT3 Cup) to compete with purpose-built tube-frame "silhouette" machines reminiscent of the former IMSA GTO/GTU classes. Grand-Am also runs various under-classes more reminiscent of GT4, though closer to factory cars. For 2012, GT3 cars will be allowed, with spec wings and splitters, as long as they pass a test at the NASCAR Research and Development Center in Concord, North Carolina, thus allowing GT3 cars to run with few modifications relative to other series (NASCAR, the parent company of Grand-Am, does not permit anti-lock brakes or traction control to be used on Grand-Am GT cars).

As of 2012, the four GT categories are in mixed health. GT1 has been all but phased out with the removal of the class from the FIA GT1 World Championship in favor of GT3 cars, in turn leading to the outright discontinuation of the series. GT2 is currently limited to certain series, including the IMSA SportsCar Championship, European Le Mans Series, FIA World Endurance Championship, Asian Le Mans Series, and the International GT Open. GT3, which has since emerged as the most popular of the GT classes, has seen widespread use in many international and regional series such as the FIA GT3 European Championship and the Blancpain Endurance Series, as well as most national series such as Germany's ADAC GT Masters and the British GT Championship. GT4 has likely been phased out like GT1, with the removal of the category from the Blancpain Endurance Series and the cancellation of the GT4 European Cup for 2012 due to issues regarding the organiser.

==== Technology escalation and control ====
While GT cars are at least in theory based on road-going models, some GT1 cars in the mid to late 1990s were effectively purpose-built sports-prototypes which spawned exotic production cars with homologation production limits of 25 cars (for small-scale manufacturers, such as Saleen) or 100 cars (for major manufacturers like Daimler AG).

The original form of GT1 racing was intended for the purebred supercars and purpose-built race cars. Examples include the McLaren F1 GTR, Ferrari F40, Porsche 911 GT1, Mercedes-Benz CLK GTR, Toyota GT-One and Nissan R390 – while the first two were a derivatives of road-going sports cars, the German and Japanese contenders were pure-bred racing cars – virtually sports prototypes. Rising costs coupled with declining entries led to the death of this class in 1998, and it was replaced by what was then called GT2 (by the FIA, which later evolved into the GT1) and Le Mans Prototype (LMP, by the ACO).

This process was repeated in 2009 in response to cost increases in GT1 and GT2 racing, resulting in the abolition of both GT classes as they stood. Various proposals exist to control technology and costs, mainly by discontinuing the existing GT1 class and creating new class boundaries between current GT2, GT3 and GT4 cars.

=== Other divisions ===
Sports car racing in general extends far beyond ACO and FIA rules, encompassing the Grand-Am professional series as well as amateur road racing classes in the Sports Car Club of America in North America.

Amateur sports car racing throughout the United States is sanctioned by clubs such as the Sports Car Club of America. The SCCA's sports-racing classes include C and D Sports Racing, Sports 2000 and Spec Racer Ford, in descending order of speed and sophistication, as well as a number of production-based and one-make classes.

In Japan, the Super GT series divides cars into two classes, called GT500 and GT300. These cars are less restricted than their European and American counterparts, with cars often sporting tube frame clips and forced induction kits. Teams are also free to change engines with other models made by the manufacturer. The numbers in the classifications refer to the maximum power (in horsepower) available to each class; this is achieved through the use of engine restrictors. Proponents of the series claim that the Super GT cars are the fastest sports cars in the world, while critics deride the cars as being outside the limits of 'acceptable' modifications. In recent years however, rule changes in both GT500 and GT1 (aimed at eventually allowing both classes to compete with each other in the future) have brought the cars closer to each other, although GT500 cars still have a notable advantage in terms of aerodynamics and cornering performance (enough to compensate for GT1 cars greater power).

In Europe, although most national championships (British, French, German and the Spain-based International GT Open) run under FIA/ACO GT regulations with some modifications to ensure a more balanced competition and lower costs, some championships are open to non-homologated GT cars. The Belcar series in Belgium allows silhouettes and touring cars to race alongside GTs, while the VdeV Modern Endurance allows small prototypes from national championships such as the Norma, Centenari and Radical to race alongside GT3-class cars. Britcar permits a wide range of touring and GT cars to compete in endurance races, and Britsports permits various kinds of sports racing cars.

== Notable racing series ==
=== World championships ===
==== Current ====
- FIA World Endurance Championship – In operation since 2012, the current auto racing World Championship for both Sports prototypes and GT cars organised by the Automobile Club de l'Ouest (ACO) and sanctioned by the Fédération Internationale de l'Automobile (FIA). The championship is considered a revival of the defunct World Sportscar Championship which ended in 1992. In 2012-2016 seasons the World Cup for GT Manufacturer was awarded to a winning manufacturer of GT cars, promoted to the World GT Manufacturers' Championship title since the 2017 season.

==== Former ====
- World Sportscar Championship – The first sports car racing world series run from 1953 to 1992. Originally contested by Sports prototypes, GT cars and even Touring cars, towards its end it was restricted to Sports prototypes only. At various times, it was known as the World Sportscar Championship, International Championship for GT Manufacturers, International Sports Car Championship, International Championship for Makes, World Championship for Makes, World Endurance Championship and World Sports Prototype Championship. In 1953-1984 seasons titles were awarded to manufacturers of sports cars belonging to two main categories: Sports prototype (except of the 1978-1981 seasons) and GT car (except of the 1953-1961 and 1982 seasons). In 1985-1992 seasons titles were awarded only to teams entering Sports prototypes (instead of manufacturers of Sports prototypes), excluding teams entering GT cars.
- FIA GT1 World Championship – A short-lived series for GT cars run from 2010 to 2012, created by Stéphane Ratel Organisation (SRO) in an attempt to promote the FIA GT Championship to World Championship status.

=== International championships ===
- Porsche Supercup – One-make series for Porsche Carrera Cup cars, serving as a support series for the Formula One world championship. Predominantly European series, but has since also ventured into western Asia.
- 24H Series – Endurance series for GT and Touring cars. Predominantly races in Europe and the Middle East, but has also gone to the United States.

==== Defunct ====
- American Le Mans Series – Based on the 24 Hours of Le Mans. Run in the United States and Canada, although held events elsewhere, as far away as Australia. Emerged from the IMSA GT split, and essentially replaced IMSA GT. It lasted from 1999 to 2013 and merged into the United SportsCar Championship.
- Intercontinental Le Mans Cup – International championship, starting in 2010 and ending in 2011. Despite its international status, it was not considered an official World Championship because it was not organised by the FIA.

=== Regional championships ===
==== North America ====
- WeatherTech SportsCar Championship – the current top-level North American sports car and GT series, founded following the merger of the Rolex Sports Car Series and the American Le Mans Series, with the first season held in 2014.
- GT World Challenge America – GT and Touring Car Racing series in the US and Canada
- Michelin Pilot Challenge – support/feeder series to the Rolex Sports Car Series and its successor WeatherTech SportsCar Championship; mixes GT and touring cars
- Trans-Am Series – Originally a touring car series incorporating some GT elements in later years but remained primarily for touring cars. Gradually evolved into a silhouette racing car series, mirroring NASCAR trends. Began in the 1960s was hugely popular during the Pony car era of muscle cars in the late 60s and early 70s, it folded in 2005. A new Muscle car series evolved in 2009.

Defunct

- IMSA Prototype Lites – Support series for the American Le Mans Series, formerly called "IMSA Lites". Single seat sports cars with motorcycle engines.
- Rolex Sports Car Series – Grand-Am's top-level US sports car series, emerged from the USRRC. Lasted from 2000 to 2013, merged into the United SportsCar Championship. Separate classes for Sports cars and GT cars.
- Can-Am – Canadian-American Challenge Cup (Prototype-based series which ran from 1966 to 1974 and in revised form from 1977 to 1986; revived in 1998 as a part of the USRRC)
- USERA – United States Endurance Racing Association – Pro-Am Endurance Championship in the United States
- IMSA GT Championship – lasted from 1971 to 1998 and replaced by ALMS and the Rolex Series.
- United States Road Racing Championship – emerged from the IMSA GT split, became the Rolex Series.
- International Race of Champions – The popular IROC one-make series has been run in the United States, in later years predominately on oval for GT and Muscle cars.

==== Europe ====
- European Le Mans Series – Sister series to the ALMS, run mostly in Europe (formerly the ELMS).
- Michelin Le Mans Cup
- GT World Challenge Europe – European Championship for GT3 cars, which replaced the FIA GT1 Championship in 2013. Consists of GT World Challenge Europe Endurance Cup & GT World Challenge Europe Sprint Cup
- International GT Open – Spain–based European Championship for GT2 and GT3 cars, founded in 2006.
- GT4 European Cup – A GT4 racing series, predominantly in Europe but some rounds elsewhere.
- Supercar Challenge series – Formerly known as the Dutch Supercar Challenge, Sportscar series held in Benelux region since 2001.

Defunct

- FIA Sportscar Championship – FIA's now-defunct European Prototype racing series – most races ended up part of the European Le Mans Series.
- FIA GT Championship – European Championship organised by FIA for GT1 and GT2 cars, ran from 1997 to 2009.
- FIA GT3 European Championship – GT3 European racing series, predominantly in Europe but some rounds elsewhere.

==== Asia-Pacific ====
- Asian Le Mans Series – Series running LMP2, LMP3 and GT3 cars.
- GT World Challenge Asia – Asian GT3 Championship founded in 2009, that replaced the Asia GT Challenge and GT Asia.
- Super GT – Japan-based sports car racing championship; previously known as the Japan GT Championship (JGTC).

Defunct

- Japan Le Mans Challenge – Established in 2006, ran in Japan and folded in 2007.
- All Japan Sports Prototype Championship – Japanese series for Gr. C cars, replaced by JGTC in 1993.
- Fuji Grand Champion Series – a Japanese series originally for Gr. 6 cars.

=== National and domestic championships ===
==== Australia & New Zealand ====
- GT World Challenge Australia – A series for GT type cars which ran from 1982 to 1985 (mostly IMSA GTO spec cars as well as Group B Sports Sedans from the then defunct Australian Sports Sedan Championship), and from 2005 to date. The championship is currently run to FIA GT3 regulations. In November 2020, the Championship was acquired by SRO Motorsports Group and Australian Racing Group for the assets as new promoter and rebranded as part of "GT World Challenge" era to debut in 2021.
- Sports Racer Series – An amateur series for small, mostly motorcycle-engined sports cars, run for the first time in 2010.
- Australian Nations Cup Championship – A series for GT type cars which ran from 2000 to 2004. Replaced by the revived Australian GT Championship in 2005 after the series organiser Procar Australia ceased operation in 2004.
- Australian Sports Car Championship – A series which ran from 1969 to 1988. It was run for the unique to Australia Group A Sports Cars regulations from 1969 to 1975, for Group D Production Sports Cars from 1976 to 1981 and again for Group A Sports Cars from 1982 to 1988.
- GT New Zealand Championship - A series for both GT4 & GT3 cars, with a blend of endurance and sprint races held around New Zealand

==== Germany ====
- Deutsche Rennsport Meisterschaft – German series which originally pitted touring cars against GT racers, Gr 6 and then Gr. C was later added.
- ADAC Supercup – A Group C only national series in Germany, replaced DRM and ran until 1989. Not to be confused with the various Porsche Supercup series.
- ADAC GT Masters – ADAC level GT series
- Interserie – Germany-based series, originally similar to Can-Am.

==== United Kingdom ====
- British GT Championship – national level GT series
- Speed – National level endurance car championship run by MotorsportVision Racing. Sometimes called LMP3 cars.
- Thundersports – a British series of the 1980s in which pretty much any kind of sports racer, GT and even touring cars were eligible.
- Clubmans – a long-running British formula which featured sophisticated, quick but economical front-engine, rear-wheel-drive sports racing cars well into the 1990s. Based originally on the popularity of the Lotus Seven.

=== Major single events ===
- 24 Hours of Le Mans – An endurance event organized by Automobile Club de l'Ouest and sanctioned by Federation Internationale de l'Automobile
- 24 Hours of Daytona
- Nürburgring 24 Hours
- Spa 24 Hours
- 12 Hours of Sebring
- Petit Le Mans
- Suzuka 1000km
- Bathurst 12 Hour

== Bibliography ==
- Denis Jenkinson, "Automobile Year Book of Sports Car Racing" (photographic history of sports car racing from the early 1950s to the 1970s).
- János Wimpffen, "Time and Two Seats" – 2 vols. Extensive history of World Championship sports car racing from 1952 to the late 1990s.
- János Wimpffen, "Open Roads And Front Engines" – a photographic companion to the above, covering the early 50s-early 60s.
- János Wimpffen, "Winged Sports Cars and Enduring Innovation" – a sequel to the above covering the early 60s-early 70s.
- János Wimpffen, "Spyders and Silhouettes" – a sequel to the above covering the early 70s-early 80s.
- John Wyer, "The Certain Sound" – memoirs of Aston Martin and Ford GT40 team manager.
- Chris Nixon, "Racing with the David Brown Aston Martins", 2 vols.
- Anthony Pritchard, "Sports Racing Cars" – profiles of 25 sports racers through history.
- Brooklands Books, "Le Mans" – 5 volumes of contemporary race reports.
- Brooklands Books, "Mille Miglia" – 2 volumes of contemporary race reports.
- Brooklands Books, "Targa Florio" – 5 volumes of contemporary race reports.
- Brooklands Books, "Carrera Panamericana" – 1 volume of contemporary race reports.
- Ian Briggs, "Endurance Racing 1982–1991" – the Group C and IMSA GTP years, race by race.
- Michael Cotton, "Directory of World Sports Cars" – IMSA and GpC car histories outlined in detail.
- Andrew Whyte, "Jaguar: Sports Racing and Works Competition Cars" – 2 vols. Authoritative history of the marque.
- Ian Bamsey, ed. "Super Sports: The 220 mph (350 km/h) Le Mans Cars" – technical summary of large-capacity coupés.
- Chris Nixon – "Sports Car Heaven" – Aston Martin vs Ferrari.
- Karl Ludvigsen – "Quicksilver Century" – competition history of Mercedes-Benz.
- Karl Ludvigsen – "Porsche: Excellence Was Expected" (3 vols) – extensive history of Porsche.
- Vic Elford, "Reflections on a Golden Era of Motorsport" – covers Vic's rallying, single seater and mostly sports car career in depth.
- Norbert Singer, "24:16" – his role in Porsche's Le Mans wins.
- John Horsman, "Racing in the Rain", an account of his engineering career with Aston Martin, John Wyer and Mirage.
- Curami/Vergnano, "'La Sport' e i suoi artigiani" – Italian domestic sports car competition from the 1930s–1960s and the 'specials' that competed in it.
- J. A. Martin & Ken Wells, "Prototypes: The History of the IMSA GTP Series" – team by team account of various racing teams and manufacturers that competed in the top flight IMSA series.
- Mike Fuller & J. A. Martin, "Inside IMSA's Legendary GTP Race Cars: The Prototype Experience", ISBN 0-7603-3069-7, Motorbooks International, 25 April 2008. Technical and historical overview of IMSA GTP racers.
